= Carewe =

Carewe is a surname. Notable people with this surname include:

- Arthur Edmund Carewe (1884–1937), Armenian-American actor
- Edwin Carewe (1883–1940), American film director
- John Carewe (born 1933), British music conductor
- Mary Carewe, British singer
- Rita Carewe (1909–1955), American actress

== See also ==
- Carew
