= Revenge (1928 film) =

1928 American silent film

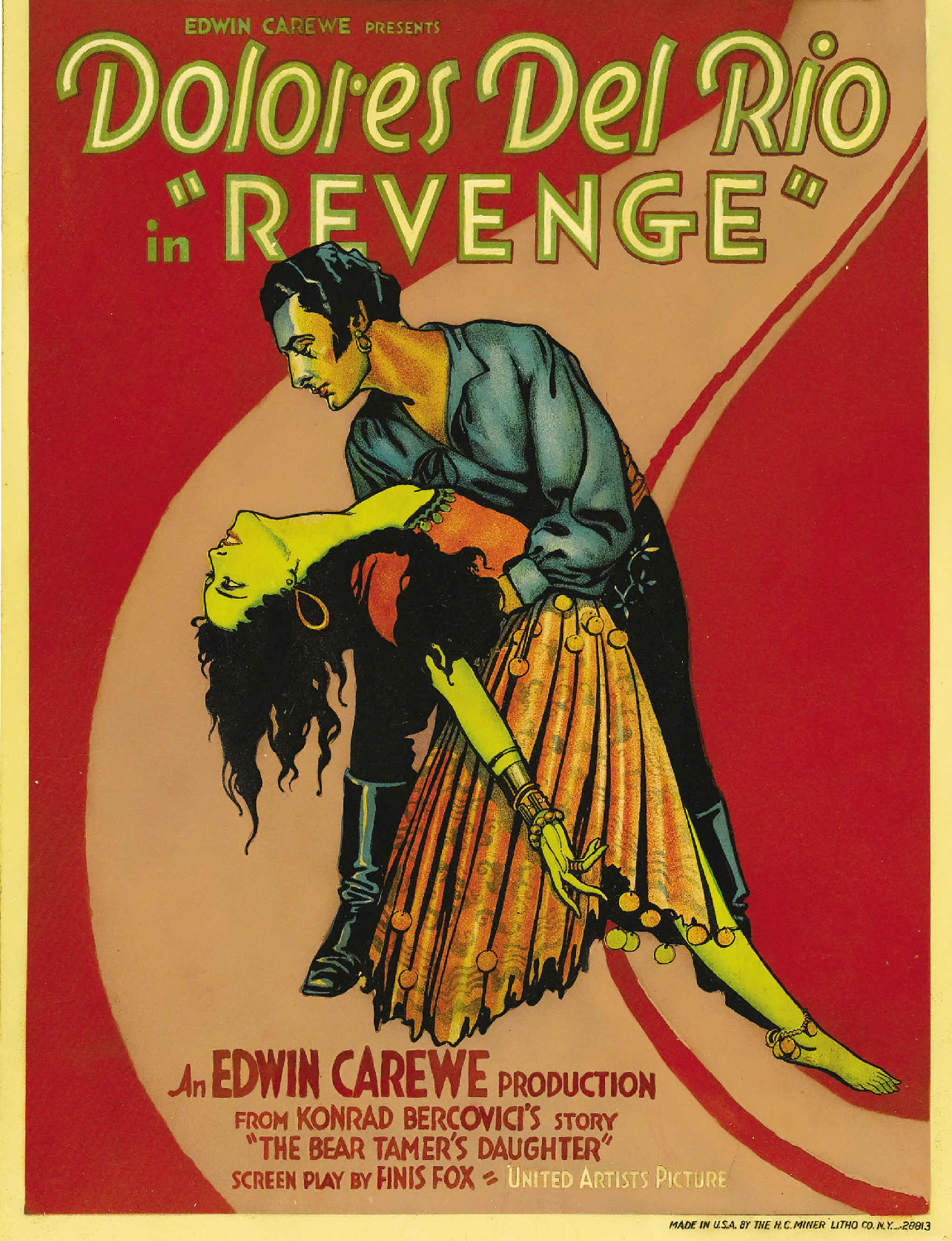
- Promotional poster for the film
- Directed by: Edwin Carewe; Joseph Schenck
- Written by: Finis Fox
- Based on: The Bear Tamer's Daughter, a short story by by Konrad Bercovici
- Produced by: Edwin Carewe
- Starring: Dolores del Río; James A. Marcus; LeRoy Mason; Rita Carewe
- Cinematography: Al Green; Robert Kurrle
- Edited by: Jeanne Spencer
- Music by: Hugo Riesenfeld
- Production company: Edwin Carewe Productions
- Distributed by: United Artists
- Release date: November 3, 1928
- Running time: 70 minutes
- Country: United States
- Languages: Sound (Synchronized) (English intertitles)

Revenge is a 1928 synchronized American sound drama film directed by Edwin Carewe. The film featured a Technicolor prologue at the start of the film in which a fortune teller conjures up and introduces each of the film characters by using her cards. While the film has no audible dialog, it was released with a synchronized musical score with sound effects using both the sound-on-disc and sound-on-film process. The film starred Dolores del Río, James A. Marcus, LeRoy Mason, and Rita Carewe. The film was based on the short story The Bear Tamer's Daughter by Konrad Bercovici.

== Plot ==
In the wild Carpathian Mountains, gypsy girl Rascha lives alongside her father Costa, the most renowned bear tamer in all Europe. Rascha enjoys bending men to her will only to scorn them once they've surrendered their hearts.

To Costa’s camp comes a gathering of nomadic romani—for trading, weddings, and celebration. Among them is Stefan, a handsome young man betrothed to Tina, daughter of Jancu, who has promised a trained bear as part of her dowry. At the campfire, Rascha performs a passionate, hypnotic dance. Her fierce beauty and smoldering gaze captivate Stefan, who abandons his promise to Tina and succumbs to Rascha’s fiery allure.

But Rascha, quick to grow bored, soon despises Stefan for his weakness and casts him aside, sending him shamefaced back to Tina.

Meanwhile, a violent rivalry brews. In a brutal knife duel, Costa defeats his longtime enemy Ursu, intensifying the blood feud between their families. Jorga, Ursu’s son and a notorious mountain bandit, vows revenge. Seeking Costa, he instead meets Rascha. Instantly drawn to each other by a primal force, the two are fated to love—but fate intervenes. Upon learning that she is Costa’s daughter, Jorga lashes out in fury and humiliation. In an act of ultimate gypsy disgrace, he cuts off Rascha’s long hair and vanishes into the mountains.

Shamed and enraged, Rascha swears vengeance. She hunts for Jorga, not knowing that he boldly sleeps in her bed while she searches. At the village inn, Stefan and Tina celebrate their impending wedding, but when Tina sees Rascha, she cruelly mocks her cropped hair. Suddenly, Jorga and his bandits burst in. To shield Rascha from further disgrace, Jorga orders all the gypsy women’s hair cut short, making Rascha indistinguishable from the others.

As the gendarmes, led by Lieutenant De Jorga, arrive in pursuit of the bandits, Jorga escapes. That night, he secretly enters Rascha’s room and, in a startling gesture of atonement, returns her cut hair and gently arranges it about her head. Rascha awakens, furious. She lashes him with her whip, again and again—until he seizes it from her and silences her cries with a searing kiss.

Costa bursts in and fires at Jorga, but Rascha spoils his aim, shouting, “How many times must I tell you that I am going to kill Jorga myself?”

At Stefan and Tina’s wedding ceremony, Jorga suddenly appears, invoking gypsy custom to take the bride. But as Rascha lunges to stab him from behind, Jorga spins around, grabs the dagger, and declares: “The bride I do not care for—this one I want. This one I take!” He lifts Rascha into his arms, mounts his horse, and rides off with his band, pursued by Costa and the enraged gypsies.

Evading his pursuers, Jorga carries Rascha to his remote mountain cave. There, a battle of wits begins as he attempts to tame her, to make her worthy of his fierce love. Though secretly in love with Jorga, Rascha fights against her feelings and plots his death. But when she stands over him, dagger in hand as he sleeps, she finds her heart cannot carry out the deed.

Costa and his armed followers storm the cave to rescue Rascha and kill her captor. But Rascha outwits them all, saves Jorga’s life, and chooses love over revenge. She rides away at his side, triumphant, to begin a new life in love and freedom.

== Cast ==
in billing order:

- Dolores del Río as Rascha
- James A. Marcus as Costa
- Sophia Ortiga as Binka
- LeRoy Mason as Jorga
- Rita Carewe as Tina
- José Crespo as Stefan
- Sam Appel as Jancu
- Marta Golden as Leana
- Jess Cavin as Lieutenant De Jorga

== Music ==
The film featured a theme song entitled "Revenge" which was written by Joe Young (lyricist), Sam M. Lewis (lyricist) and Harry Akst (composer). Hugo Riesenfeld arranged and directed the musical score for the film. A second song entitled "Dolores," which was composed by Ted Ward and Edward A. Grossman, was also featured on the soundtrack of the film.

== Production ==
Dolores del Río had the luxury of renaming the film adaptation as Revenge, as she believed that all of her film successes began with the letter "R" (Resurrection (1927), Ramona (1928), and The Red Dance (1928)). While del Rio was in the middle of divorcing Jaime Martínez del Río in 1926, Revenge was abandoned. She eventually divorced him in 1928. Production resumed on Revenge in June 1928 and was finished filming by August 1928.

=== Cinematography ===
Revenge's cinematographers were Al Green and Robert Kurrle.

=== Editing ===
Editing of Revenge was done by Jeanne Spencer.

== Reception ==
=== Release ===
Revenge was released on November 3, 1928, in United States film theatres.

== Preservation ==
Complete prints of Revenge are held at the George Eastman Museum, the UCLA Film and Television Archive, and Archives Du Film Du CNC.

== See also ==
- List of early sound feature films (1926–1929)
