= The Trail to Yesterday =

1918 film

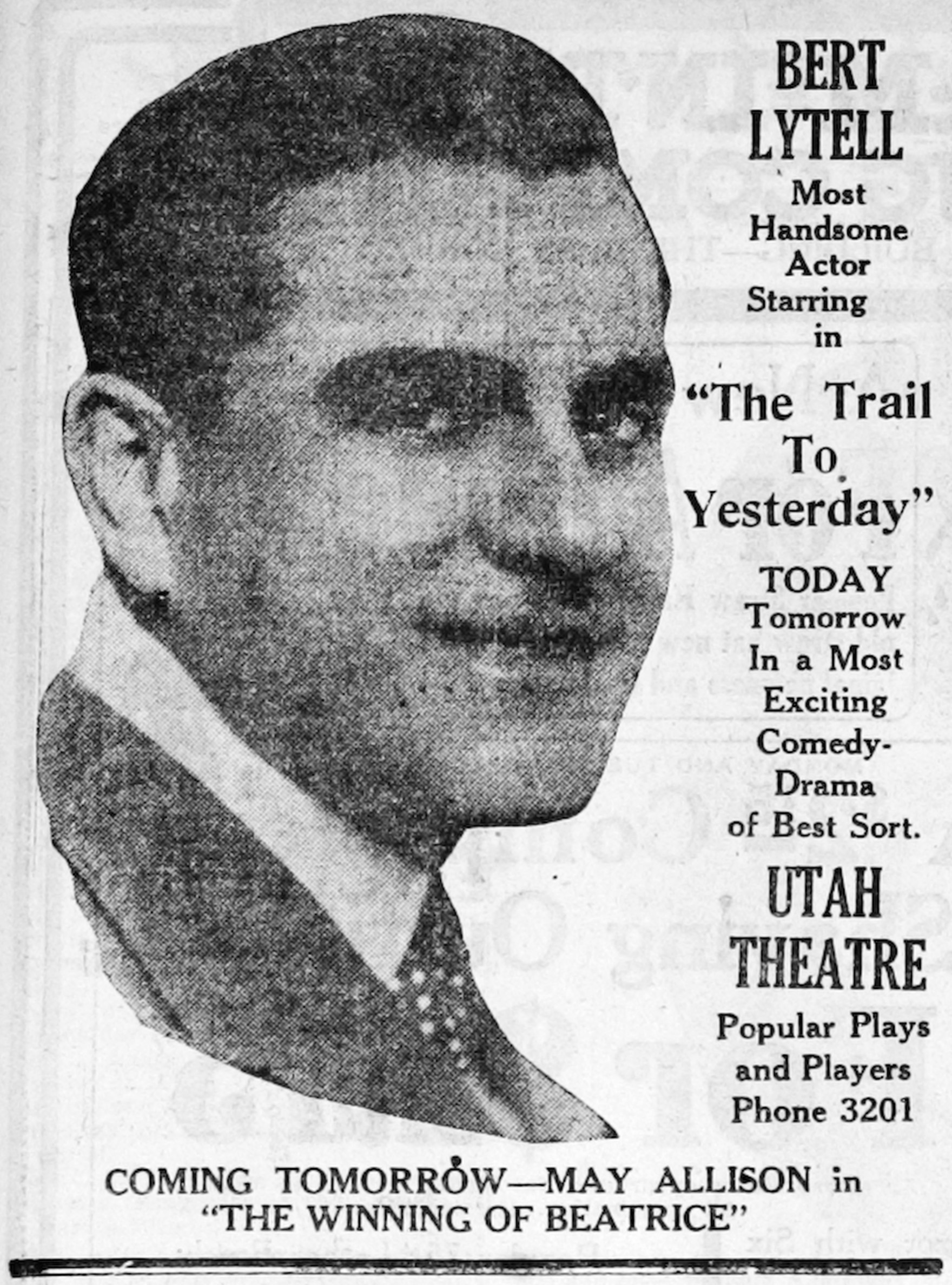
- Newspaper advertisement
- Directed by: Edwin Carewe
- Written by: June Mathis (scenario)
- Based on: The Trail to Yesterday by Charles Alden Seltzer
- Produced by: Metro Pictures
- Starring: Bert Lytell; Anna Q. Nilsson
- Cinematography: Robert Kurrle
- Distributed by: Metro Pictures
- Release date: May 6, 1918
- Running time: 6 reels
- Country: United States
- Languages: Silent; English intertitles

The Trail to Yesterday is a 1918 American silent Western film directed by Edwin Carewe and starring Bert Lytell and Anna Q. Nilsson. It was produced by and distributed by Metro Pictures. It is based on a novel, The Trail to Yesterday (1913), by Charles Alden Seltzer.

== Plot ==
As described in a film magazine, David Langford kills his partner and accuses the son of the murder. A fugitive from justice, Ned Keegles goes out west, determined on revenge. When he meets Sheila Langford, he forces her to marry him, and believes his revenge is complete. When he hears that Langford is Sheila's stepfather, he is sorry. He tells Sheila so and begs for her forgiveness, but his enemies have darkened his character and she is slow to forgive. The attempted murder of Ned's best friend forces him to talk. Sheila comes to understand the true state of affairs and becomes satisfied with her marriage and the forced ceremony.

== Cast ==
- Bert Lytell as Ned "Dakota" Keegles
- Anna Q. Nilsson as Sheila Langford
- Harry S. Northrup as Jack Duncan
- Ernest Maupain as David Langford
- John A. Smiley as Ben Doubler
- Danny Hogan as "Texas" Blanco

== Production ==
Some filming took place at Arivaca, Arizona.

== Reception ==
Like many American films of the time, The Trail to Yesterday was subject to cuts by city and state film censorship boards. For example, the Chicago Board of Censors required cuts, in Reel 3, of Dakota shooting Blanco and his falling and, in Reel 5, of Duncan shooting an old man at the door.

== Preservation ==
A complete print of The Trail to Yesterday is held by EYE Filmmuseum in the Netherlands.
