= Jeanne Spencer =

American film editor

- Born: Jeanne Genevieve Spencer; November 29, 1897; Covington, Kentucky, U.S.
- Died: July 18, 1986 (aged 88); Encinitas, California, U.S.
- Occupation: Film editor
- Spouse: Frank Ware
- Relatives: Dorothy Spencer (sister)

Jeanne Spencer (sometimes credited as Jeanne Spencer Ware; born November 29, 1897 - July 18, 1986) was an American film editor active from the 1920s to the 1930s. Her younger sister, Dorothy, was also a film editor.

== Biography ==
Jeanne was born in Covington, Kentucky, to Charles Spencer and Catherine Spellbrink. She was the eldest of the couple's children. After high school, she got a job working for her uncle at The Cincinnati Enquirer.

By the early 1920s, she was living in Hollywood and working as a film cutter, although she didn't receive credits on her earliest projects. She also worked as an assistant director in those early days (notably on 1920's The Devil's Pass Key). In the early 1920s, she married fellow editor Frank Ware. He died at the age of 39 in 1932.

She continued editing after Frank's death and also took up writing plays. She sold her play Senate Page Boys (co-written with Albert Benham) in 1939 and helped write the adaptation that became 1941's Adventure in Washington.

== Selected filmography ==
As editor:

- Hollywood Mystery (1934) (aka Hollywood Hoodlum)
- Her Resale Value (1933)
- Alimony Madness (1933)
- Neighbors' Wives (1933)
- Revenge at Monte Carlo (1933)
- Behind Jury Doors (1932)
- The Heart Punch (1932)
- Trapped in Tia Juana (1932)
- Evangeline (1929)
- Revenge (1928)
- Ramona (1928)
- Resurrection (1927)
- Passionate Youth (1925)

As screenwriter:

- Adventure in Washington (1941)

As assistant director:

- The Devil's Pass Key (1920)
