= Madge Tyrone =

American actress, film editor, and screenwriter

- Born: Margaret Elizabeth Towle; January 5, 1884; Boston, Massachusetts, U.S.
- Died: April 13, 1955 (aged 71); New York, U.S.
- Resting place: Gate of Heaven Cemetery
- Education: Radcliffe College
- Occupations: Screenwriter, actress, film editor
- Years active: 1907 – 1927
- Spouse(s): Edwin Van Heusen Paul (m. 1916; div. 1919)
- Relatives: Ursula Parrott

Margaret Elizabeth Towle (January 5, 1884 – April 13, 1955), billed initially as Madge Towle, but better known as Madge Tyrone, was an American actress, film editor, and screenwriter active during Hollywood's silent era.

== Early life and career ==
Tyrone was born in Boston, Massachusetts, on January 5, 1884, the first born and only child of Elizabeth (née Mooney) and Dr. Henry C. Towle. (Note: Dr. Towle's other children (i.e.Tyrone's half-siblings, Lucy and Katherine–aka Ursula Parrott–were products of Dr. Towle's second marriage.) Fifteen days later, Mrs. Towle was dead, having contracted a severe and unrelenting fever just two days after the delivery. She attended Radcliffe College for three years, from 1901 to 1904.

In November 1907, Tyrone began her career as a stage actress, credited—as would remain the case for the next three years—as Madge Towle, making her debut in the stage adaptation of Buster Brown; other appearances, thus credited, included August 1909 at Vancouver's Orpheum, in Pals.

April 1911 marked her stage-named debut at the Baker Theatre in Rochester, New York, in Eugene Walter's Boots and Saddles. Tyron's Broadway debut came later that year in The Wife Decides. She also worked as a newspaperwoman and magazine writer before beginning her career in Hollywood.

By 1914, she was living in Los Angeles, where she appeared in a number of Our Mutual Girl serials produced by Reliance Film Company. She'd appear in a few more films as an actress before taking up writing and editing.

In 1920, Louis B. Mayer added her to First National's story department. She worked with director Edwin Carewe on a number of projects—from Rio Grande to The Lady Who Lied—and was considered one of his proteges. In 1922, she was involved in a bad car accident in Los Angeles; she made a full recovery after taking some time off.

== Personal life ==
In the fall of 1916, Tyrone married Edwin Van Deusen Paul. Ending via divorce three years later, the marriage did last long enough to afford her at least one performance—in the self-penned vaudeville sketch entitled "She Writes for the Movies"—credited as Madge Tyrone Paul and "assisted by Miss [Ada] Alford and Mr. E. V. D. Paul".

Little is known about Tyrone's life after 1925, but from what little was published, it is clear that the Boston-based actress had by that time become a full-fledged New Yorker. Albeit slightly misnamed, she is included amongst the three surviving daughters in her father's 1930 obituary, as "Mary Towles of New York"; moreover, a real estate item published nine years later in the New York Herald Tribune names Towle as one of the many parties to whom Frances Spencer Inc. is leasing furnished penthouse apartments in New York's West Village. In addition, the 1950 U.S. Census lists a 66-year-old, single, white, Massachusetts-born female named Madge Towle, residing in Manhattan.

On April 13, 1955, Tyrone died, aged 71, in New York City. Her remains are interred at the Gate of Heaven Cemetery in Hawthorne, New York.

== Selected filmography ==
As a writer:

- The Lady Who Lied (1925)
- Rose o' the Sea (1925)
- The Invisible Fear (1921)
- Habit (1921)
- The Woman in His House (1920)
- Rio Grande (1920)

As an editor:

- One Clear Call (1922)
- The Child Thou Gavest Me (1921)

As an actress:

- One Day (1916)
- The House of Tears (1915)
- Our Mutual Girl (1914) (serial)
