= Evangeline (1929 film) =

1929 film by Edwin Carewe

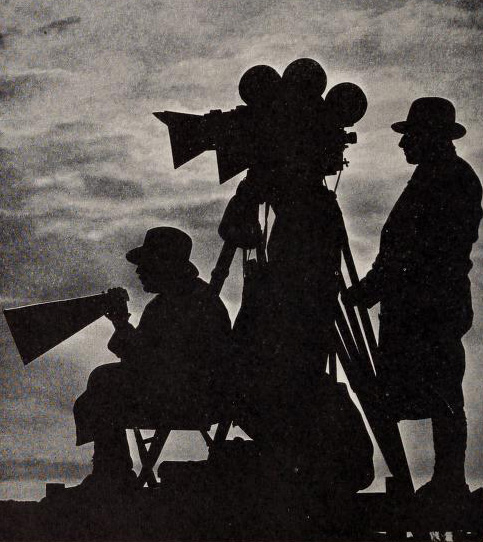
- Cinematographer Robert Kurrle and director Edwin Carewe filming a dusk scene for Evangeline
- Directed by: Edwin Carewe
- Written by: Finis Fox (scenario & intertitles)
- Based on: Evangeline by Henry Wadsworth Longfellow
- Produced by: Joseph M. Schenck
- Starring: Dolores del Río
- Cinematography: Robert Kurrle; Al M. Green
- Edited by: Jeanne Spencer
- Music by: Hugo Riesenfeld
- Distributed by: United Artists
- Release date: August 24, 1929
- Running time: 9 reels (8,268 feet)
- Country: United States
- Languages: Sound (Synchronized); English intertitles

Evangeline is a 1929 American synchronized sound drama film directed by Edwin Carewe and starring Dolores del Río. While the film has no audible dialog, it was released with a synchronized musical score with sound effects using both the sound-on-disc and sound-on-film process. The film was based on a Arthur Hopkins produced play that made it to Broadway in 1913. It is the last film version of the 1847 poem of the same name by Henry Wadsworth Longfellow that did not include any dialogue.

The full 1929 movie Evangeline

== Cast ==
- Dolores del Río as Evangeline
- Roland Drew as Gabriel
- Alec B. Francis as Father Felician
- Donald Reed as Baptiste
- Paul McAllister as Benedict Bellefontaine
- James A. Marcus as Basil
- George F. Marion as Rene LeBlanc
- Bobby Mack as Michael
- Louis Payne as Governor-General
- Lee Shumway as Colonel Winslow

== Music ==
The film featured a theme song entitled "Evangeline" which was composed by Al Jolson and Billy Rose.

== Preservation ==
Complete prints of Evangeline are held by the Library of Congress and the UCLA Film & Television Archive.

== See also ==
- List of early sound feature films (1926–1929)
