= Robert Kurrle =

American cinematographer

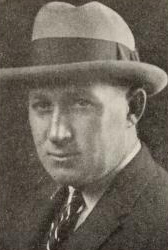
- Kurrle in 1922
- Born: Robert Bard Kurrle; February 2, 1890; Port Hueneme, California, United States
- Died: October 27, 1932 (aged 42); Hollywood, California, United States
- Occupation: Cinematographer
- Years active: 1916–1932

Robert Kurrle (February 2, 1890 – October 27, 1932), also known as Robert B. Kurrle, was an American cinematographer during the silent and early talking film eras. Prior to entering the film industry, he was already experimenting with aerial photography. Considered a very prominent cinematographer, even his early work received notice and praise from both critics and other industry professionals. The advent of sound film did not abate his continued rise, and he became the top director of photography at Warner Brothers by 1932.

He shot 70 films over the sixteen years of his career, working with such prominent directors as William Wellman, Raoul Walsh, Michael Curtiz, Archie Mayo, and William Dieterle. He was a member of the American Society of Cinematographers by 1921, and he was also one of the inaugural members of the International Photographers branch of I.A.T.S.E. (International Alliance of Theatrical Stage Employees). In October 1932, at the height of his career, he suddenly fell ill after wrapping a film. Hospitalized, his condition quickly worsened and within a week he was dead of an infection to the brain.

== Early life ==
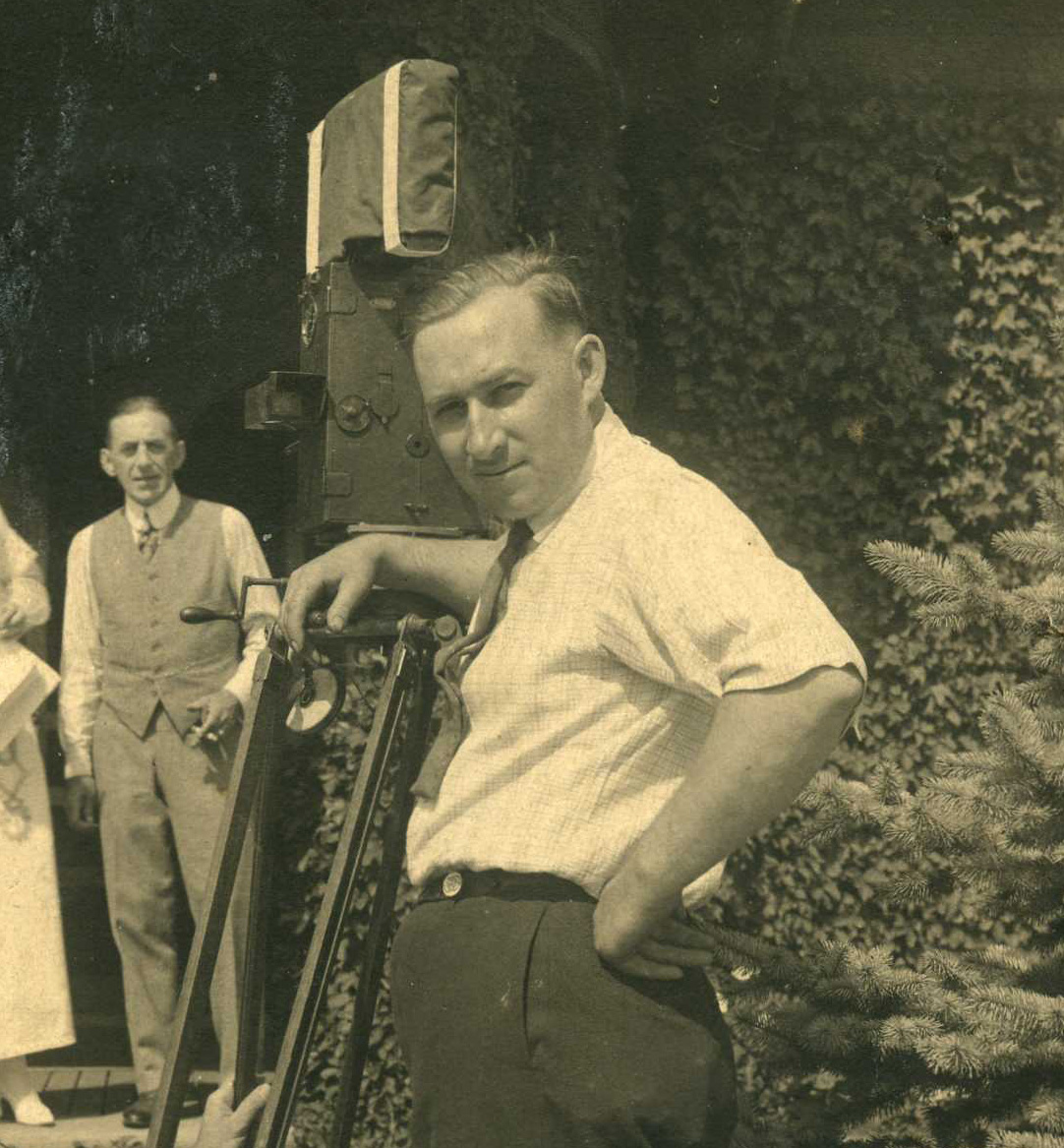
Kurrle on the set in December 1916 photographing Sidney Drew (visible in background)

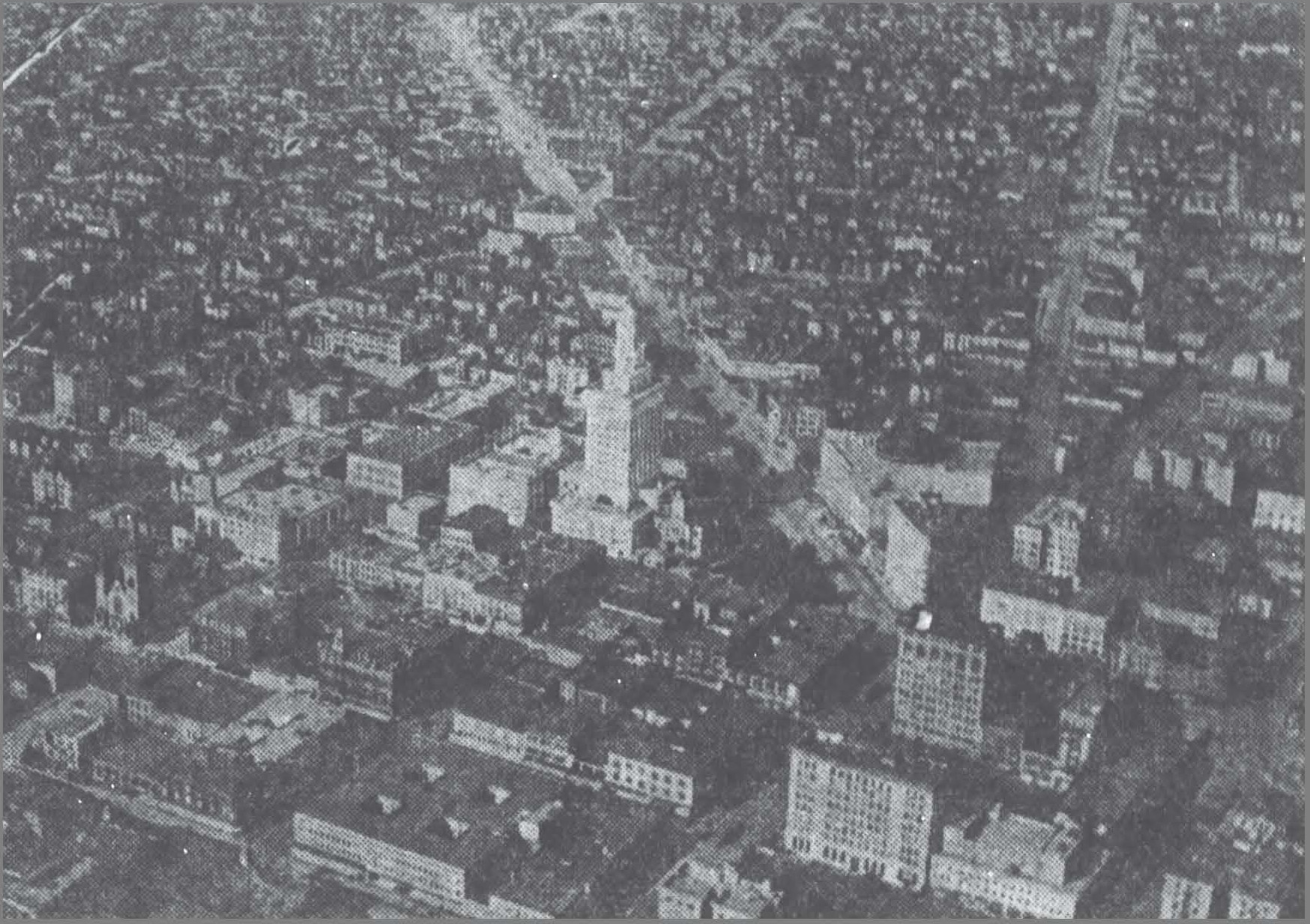
Aerial photograph of Oakland, CA by Kurrle in 1913.

Born Robert Bard Kurrle in Port Hueneme, California on February 2, 1890, Kurrle had at least one sibling, Ernest W. Kurrle. Prior to his entry into the film industry, Kurrle was already an innovative filmmaker. In 1909, flying in a Curtiss open cockpit bi-plane, he photographed the Panama Canal from the air. In 1913, Kurrle would become the first photographer to take an aerial photograph of the city of Oakland, California. Describing the experience, Kurrle said "... we went along just as smoothly as if we were riding on velvet".

== Film career ==
=== Metro years and freelancing ===
Kurrle's first foray into the film industry was on the 1916 film, Her Great Price, directed by Edwin Carewe. He later collaborated with Carewe on a number of pictures during the 1920s. He began his career working for Metro Pictures, where he stayed at until 1921. Metro was one of the film companies which merged in 1924 to form Metro-Goldwyn-Mayer. The quality of Kurrle's work was noticed even early in his career. His filming of 1919's Lion's Den was called "spectacular". Kurrle's work the following year on The Right of Way was described by some as "... remarkable even in this day of almost perfect cinematography." By 1921, Kurrle was already a member of the American Society of Cinematographers (ASC). Early that year, he followed Carewe and left Metro to become a freelance cinematographer. Fifteen of the twenty-four films Kurrle worked on during 1921-27 were directed by Carewe. In 1922, while filming a Carewe picture, I Am the Law, Kurrle successfully tested a new high-speed film from Eastman. The new film allowed interior filming with less lighting, reducing both equipment and staffing costs.

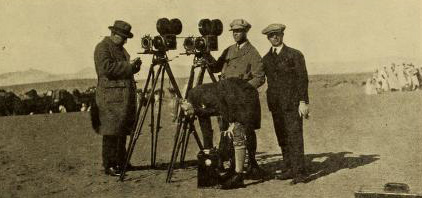
Kurlle (left) on location in the Sahara, 1924

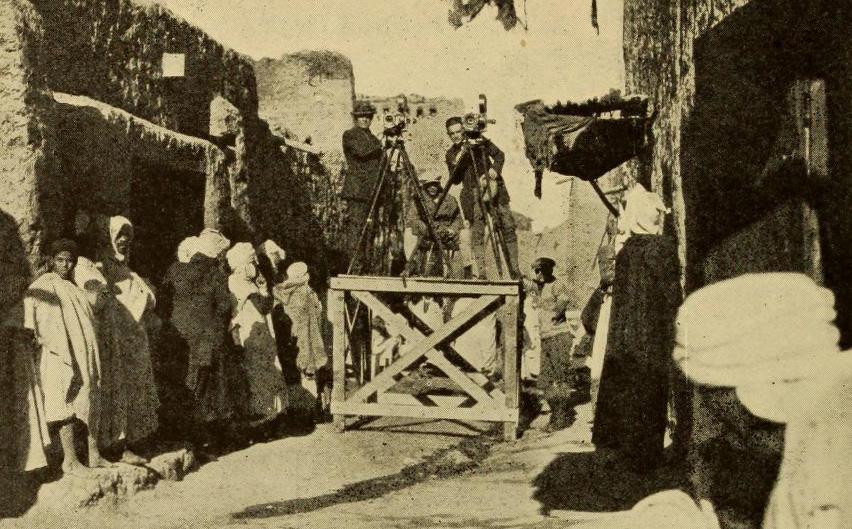
Robert Kurrle (left) and his assistant, Al Green on location in the Sahara during filming of 1924's A Son of the Sahara

Over the course of his career, Kurlle received numerous positive criticism and attention from other industry members and publications. He was highlighted in American Cinematographer on many occasions, the first time being in the 1922 edition, where he was called a "valued member" of the ASC. When he was selected to man the camera for fellow ASC member Phil Rosen's film, Abraham Lincoln, a prominent industry magazine stated that Kurlle's career had been "brilliant" up to that point. In July 1924, after Kurrle's return from north Africa where he shot A Son of the Sahara, American Cinematographer called him "... a master of his profession."

For 1926's Wings of the Storm, Kurrle's exterior shots in Mt. Rainier National Park received positive comments from industry trade papers. In 1927 Kurrle was lauded for his camerawork on the film adaptation of Tolstoy's Resurrection, which was directed by his long-term collaborator Carrewe. The following year, in the first ever American Cinematographer poll of the top Hollywood directors, Kurrle was selected as one of the top 10 cinematographers in the industry. That same year, 1928, his camera work on Sadie Thompson, was lauded as "... beautifully done, and the settings are completely in the mood of the story".

=== Universal and Warner Brothers ===
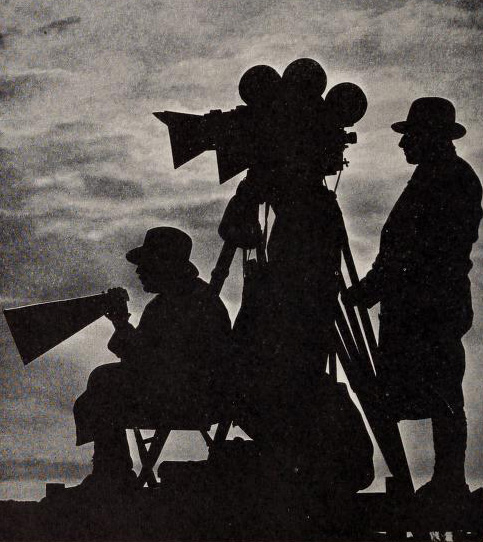
Kurlle (behind the camera), and director Edwin Carewe (seated in front of the camera), filming a dusk scene in 1929's Evangeline

By 1928 Kurrle was being called a "camera ace", a reference not only to his skill behind the camera, but also to the fact that he was one of the few people in Hollywood to own their own plane. In 1928 he worked exclusively with Universal Pictures, before returning to freelance the following year. In mid-1930, Kurrle signed a contract with Warner Brothers. Over the next two years he rose to become their top cinematographer. During his sixteen-year career, he worked with such notable directors as John Ince, William Wellman, Raoul Walsh, Michael Curtiz, Archie Mayo, and William Dieterle (who directed the final film Kurrle photographed). In 1928 Kurrle was one of the inaugural members of the International Photographers branch of the International Alliance of Theatrical Stage Employees (I.A.T.S.E.).

Even when the film was given less than stellar press, Kurrle's work was often praised, as in the case of the 1929 film Her Majesty, Love, where it was noted, "The story is negligible, the cast, though capable, has nothing to do, and the direction is heavy handed and slow. But Robert Kurrle's cinematography is outstanding." That same year, his camerawork on another Carewe film, an adaptation of Longfellow's Evangeline, was deemed as "beautiful" by The Film Daily. The magazine also rated his photography as "excellent" for Merian Cooper's version of the classic tale, The Four Feathers. There were times when his work only garnered average reviews in some papers, such as 1930's Hit the Deck, while still gaining praise in others.

Kurrle was behind the camera for Lloyd Bacon's 1930 version of Moby Dick, for which his work received high praise, being called "... one of the three outstanding elements of the entire work." In 1931, his work on Resurrection was described as "... brilliant and sweeping". During 1932, Kurrle was the director of photography on ten feature films which were released that year. In September and October 1932, he worked on back to back films. The first was The Match King, featuring Warren William and Lili Damita, followed by Lawyer Man, starring William Powell and Joan Blondell. Lawyer Man was his final film.

== Death ==
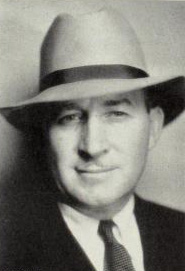
Kurlle in 1932

Following the completion of his work on Lawyer Man, he went to the hospital for treatment of a persistent cold. This developed into a sinus infection, which further worsened into an infection in his brain. He remained in the hospital for over a week, fighting the infection, but eventually died from it. His death at the age of 42 on October 27, 1932, shocked the film industry. Later it was reported that the infection was meningitis. The last two films he worked on were released posthumously. Upon his death, American Cinematographer said, "The Motion Picture Industry lost one of its greatest cinematographers and finest gentlemen ..."

His memorial service was held at The Little Church of the Flowers in Glendale, California, after which he was interred in Forest Lawn Memorial Park, also in Glendale.

== Filmography ==
(Per AFI database)

- Her Great Price (1916)
- Boston Blackie's Little Pal (1918)
- Hitting the High Spots (1918)
- No Man's Land (1918)
- The Trail to Yesterday (1918)
- Unexpected Places (1918)
- Easy to Make Money (1919)
- Faith (1919)
- Blind Man's Eyes (1919)
- Blackie's Redemption (1919)
- The Lion's Den (1919)
- Lombardi, Ltd. (1919)
- One-Thing-at-a-Time O'Day (1919)
- The Spender (1919)
- Isobel; or the Trail's End (1920)
- The Right of Way (1920)
- Rio Grande (1920)
- Habit (1921)
- Her Mad Bargain (1921)
- The Invisible Fear (1921)
- The Lure of Youth (1921)
- Playthings of Destiny (1921)
- I Am the Law (1922)
- A Question of Honor (1922)
- Silver Wings (1922)
- All the Brothers Were Valiant (1923)
- Abraham Lincoln (1924)
- Madonna of the Streets (1924)
- A Son of the Sahara (1924)
- Joanna (1925)
- The Lady Who Lied (1925)
- The Red Rider (1925)
- Sackcloth and Scarlet (1925)
- Why Women Love (1925)
- High Steppers (1926)
- Pals First (1926)
- Wings of the Storm (1926)
- Breakfast at Sunrise (1927)
- Resurrection (1927)
- The Stolen Bride (1927)
- The Tender Hour (1927)
- Ramona (1928)
- Revenge (1928)
- Sadie Thompson (1928)
- Evangeline (1929)
- The Four Feathers (1929)
- Rio Rita (1929)
- Dancing Sweeties (1930)
- The Furies (1930)
- Hit the Deck (1930)
- Maybe It's Love (1930)
- Moby Dick (1930)
- River's End (1930)
- God's Gift to Women (1931)
- Her Majesty Love (1931)
- Illicit (1931)
- Resurrection (1931)
- The Road to Singapore (1931)
- Smart Money (1931)
- The Crooked Circle (1932)
- Crooner (1932)
- The Expert (1932)
- High Pressure (1932)
- Jewel Robbery (1932)
- Lawyer Man (1933)
- The Match King (1932)
- One Way Passage (1932)
- The Strange Love of Molly Louvain (1932)
- Winner Take All (1932)
