= High Steppers =

1926 film

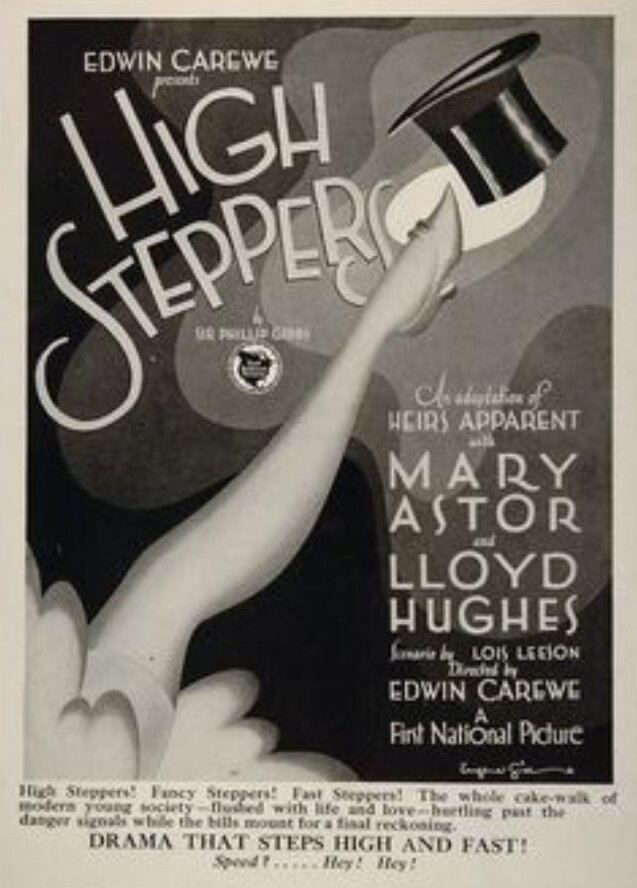
- Advertisement
- Directed by: Edwin Carewe
- Written by: Finis Fox; Lois Leeson
- Based on: Heirs Apparent by Philip Gibbs
- Produced by: Edwin Carewe
- Starring: Lloyd Hughes; Mary Astor; Dolores del Río
- Cinematography: Robert Kurrle
- Distributed by: First National Pictures
- Release date: March 14, 1926
- Running time: 70 mins.
- Country: United States
- Language: Silent (English intertitles)

High Steppers is a 1926 American silent drama film produced and directed by Edwin Carewe and distributed by First National Pictures. The film is based on the novel Heirs Apparent by Philip Gibbs.

== Plot ==
Julian Perryam gets thrown out of Oxford University and returns to the family estate outside London. He discovers that his sister and his mother are caught up in the "jazz" life and their father, who's the editor of a tabloid scandal rag, is too busy to notice. He also discovers that his sister is in love with the scoundrel son of his father's publisher, Victor Buckland. Learning that Buckland is actually an embezzler, Julian gets a job as a reporter on a muckraking publication and sets out to expose Buckland.

== Cast ==
- Lloyd Hughes as Julian Perryam
- Mary Astor as Audrey Nye
- Dolores del Río as Evelyn Iffield
- Rita Carewe as Janette Perryam
- John T. Murray as Cyril Buckland
- Edwards Davis as Victor Buckland
- Alec B. Francis as Father Perryam
- Clarissa Selwynne as Mrs. Perryam (credited as Clarissa Selwyn)
- Charles Sellon as Grandpa Perryam
- John Steppling as Major Iffield
- Emily Fitzroy as Mrs. Iffield
- Margaret McWade as Mrs. Clancy

== Preservation ==
With no prints of High Steppers located in any film archives, it is considered a lost film.
