= Pals First =

1926 film

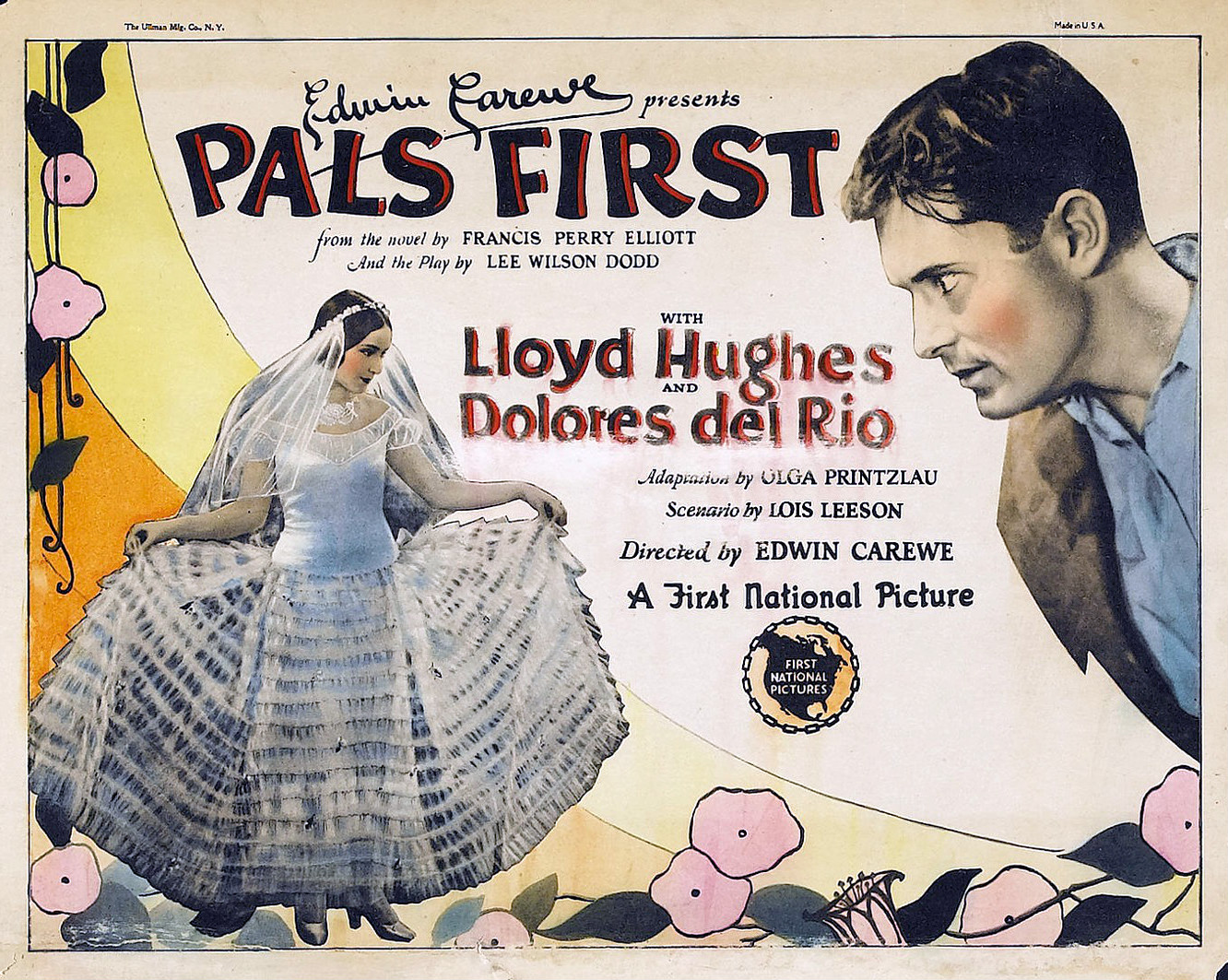
- Lobby card
- Directed by: Edwin Carewe
- Written by: Lee Wilson Dodd (play); Lois Leeson; Olga Printzlau; Ralph Spence
- Based on: Pals First by Francis Perry Elliott
- Produced by: Edwin Carewe
- Starring: Dolores del Río; Lloyd Hughes; Alec B. Francis
- Cinematography: Robert Kurrle
- Distributed by: First National Pictures
- Release date: August 8, 1926
- Running time: 7 reels
- Country: United States
- Language: Silent (English intertitles)

Pals First is a 1926 American silent drama film produced and directed by Edwin Carewe. It stars Dolores del Río and Lloyd Hughes. Edwin Carewe directed the earlier 1918 version for Yorke Film Corporation also titled Pals First.

== Cast ==
- Dolores del Río as Jeanne Lamont
- Lloyd Hughes as Richard Castleman / Danny Rowland
- Alec B. Francis as Dominie
- George Cooper as The Squirrel
- Edward Earle as Dr. Harry Shilton
- Hamilton Morse as Judge Lamont
- George H. Reed as Uncle Alex
- Alice Nichols as Aunt Caroline
- Alice Belcher as Charley Anderson
- Margaret Gray as Girl (uncredited)

== Production ==
Pals First was the first film starring Dolores del Rio. For its advertising, First National circulated a photo in major film magazines in which Dolores wore a comb, with photos of six male stars of the production company.

== Preservation ==
With no prints of Pals First located in any film archives, it is a lost film.
