= Resurrection (1931 English-language film) =

1931 film

- Directed by: Edwin Carewe
- Screenplay by: Finis Fox
- Based on: Resurrection; 1899 novel by Leo Tolstoy
- Produced by: E. M. Asher; Edwin Carewe; Carl Laemmle Jr.
- Starring: John Boles; Lupe Vélez; Nance O'Neill; William Keighley; Rose Tapley; Michael Mark; Sylvia Nadina; George Irving; Edward Cecil; Mary Forman; Grace Cunard; Dorothy Flood
- Cinematography: Robert Kurrle; Al Green
- Music by: Dimitri Tiomkin
- Production company: Universal Pictures
- Distributed by: Universal Pictures
- Release date: January 27, 1931
- Running time: 81 minutes
- Country: United States
- Language: English

Resurrection is a 1931 American Pre-Code English-language adaptation of the 1899 Leo Tolstoy novel Resurrection produced by Universal Studios. It was an all-talking version.

The film starred John Boles as well as Lupe Vélez.

It was directed by Edwin Carewe, who had also directed the previous 1927 silent adaptation.

A Spanish language version, Resurrección was also made in the same year by Universal Studios. John Boles and Lupe Vélez also starred in the Spanish-language version.

== Plot ==
Country girl Katusha is seduced and abandoned by Prince Nekludov who, years later, finds himself on a jury trying the same Katusha for a crime to which he now realizes that his actions drove her. He follows her to imprisonment in Siberia, intent on redeeming her and himself as well.

== Cast ==
=== English version ===
The cast list is as follows:

- John Boles as Prince Dmitri Nekhludoff
- Lupe Vélez as Katyusha Maslova
- Rose Tapley as Princess Sophya
- Nance O'Neil as Princess Marya
- William Keighley as Captain Schoenbock
- Michael Mark as Simon Kartinkin – Innkeeper
- Sylvia Nadina as Simon's Wife
- George Irving as Judge
- Edward Cecil as Smelkoff the Merchant
- Mary Forman as Beautiful Exile
- Grace Cunard as Olga
- Dorothy Flood as Princess Hasan
