= Sam Appel =

American actor (1871–1947)

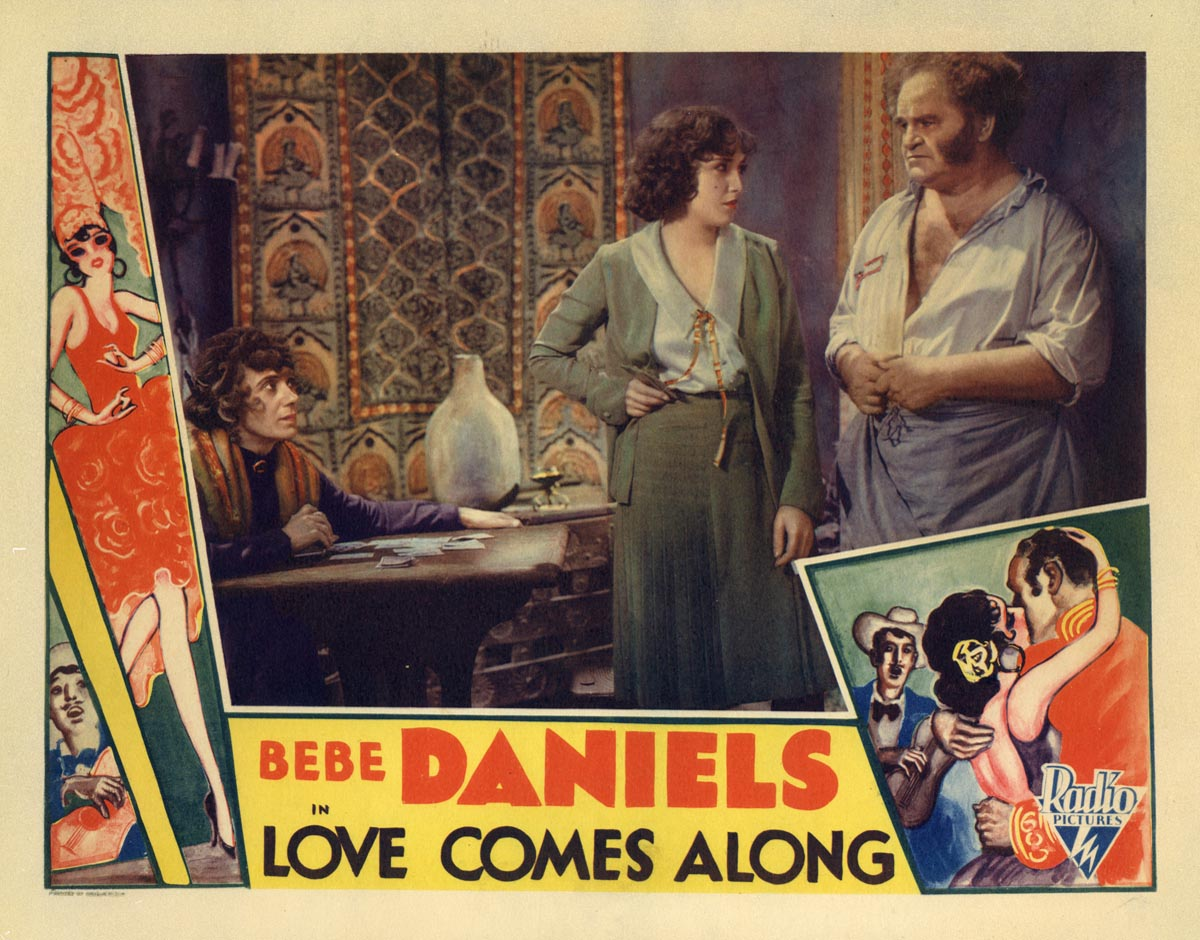
- Bebe Daniels and Sam Appel in Love Comes Along (1930)
- Born: Samuel Appel; August 8, 1871; Magdalena, Jalisco, Mexico
- Died: June 18, 1947 (aged 75); Los Angeles, California, United States
- Occupation: Actor
- Years active: 1918–1946

Sam Appel (August 8, 1871 – June 18, 1947) was a Mexican-born American character actor of the silent and sound film eras. He appeared in forty films during his 28-year career, mostly in supporting roles.

== Filmography ==
(Per AFI database)

- She Hired a Husband (1918)
- The Light of Western Stars (1918)
- The Silk Lined Burglar (1919)
- The Web of Chance (1919)
- La La Lucille (1920)
- Two Kinds of Women (1922)
- The Girl of the Golden West (1923)
- Long Live the King (1923)
- Code of the Sea (1924)
- The Lady Who Lied (1925)
- The White Black Sheep (1926)
- Revenge (1928)
- Love Comes Along (1930)
- Under a Texas Moon (1930)
- Yankee Don (1931)
- Flying Down to Rio (1933)
- Grand Canary (1934)
- The Mighty Barnum (1934)
- Hi, Gaucho! (1935)
- In Caliente (1935)
- Man of Iron (1935)
- Under the Pampas Moon (1935)
- Diamond Jim (1935)
- Rose of the Rancho (1936)
- Ramona (1936)
- A Message to Garcia (1936)
- Anthony Adverse (1936)
- Give Us This Night (1936)
- The Firefly (1937)
- The Last Train from Madrid (1937)
- 20 Mule Team (1940)
- Down Mexico Way (1941)
- A Girl, a Guy and a Gob (1941)
- Honolulu Lu (1941)
- Reap the Wild Wind (1942)
- Bad Men of the Border (1945)
- Masquerade in Mexico (1946)
- Gilda (1946)
- Perilous Holiday (1946)
- The Return of Monte Cristo (1946)
