= Silver Wings (film) =

1922 film by Edwin Carewe and John Ford

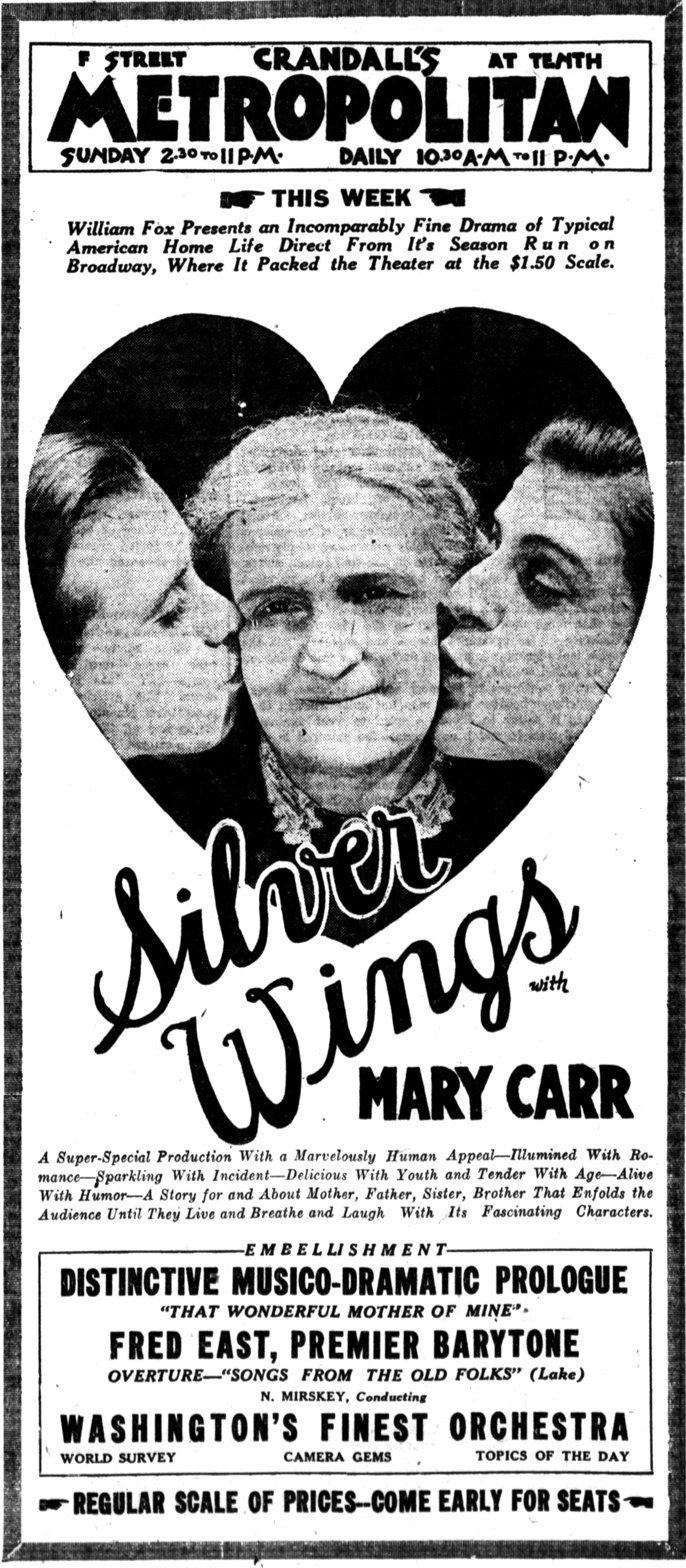
- Newspaper ad for the film playing at Crandall's Metropolitan Theatre, downtown Washington D.C. Tenth & F Streets N.W.
- Directed by: Edwin Carewe; John Ford
- Written by: Paul Sloane
- Produced by: William Fox
- Starring: Mary Carr; Lynn Hammond
- Cinematography: Robert Kurrle; Joseph Ruttenberg
- Distributed by: Fox Film Corporation
- Release date: May 22, 1922
- Running time: 90 minutes
- Country: United States
- Language: Silent (English intertitles)

Silver Wings is a 1922 American drama film directed by Edwin Carewe and John Ford. Ford directed only the prologue of the film.

== Plot ==
As described in a film magazine, Uncle Andrew (Brooke) lives with Anna (Carr) and John Webb (Hammond), and rejoices when the Webbs get an offer of $10,000 for his invention, but Mother Webb advises building their own factory and taking a chance on the invention. Her advice proves wise, and by the time the children are grown, the family is on its way to prosperity. Harry (Striker), the elder son and mother's favorite, gives her the affection she craves, but she cannot see his shallowness, deceit, and general unworthiness. John (Helton), both as a child and when grown, suffers for his brothers sins, at last taking the blame for his brother's thefts from the factory. Harry drives his sister Ruth (Thomas) from home because he does not want her to marry a working man, this after their father has died on Christmas Day while all the family was together, his wife telling him of the happiness he has given her. Mrs. Webb takes over the management of the Webb shop, and has the help of John and Uncle Andrew, but Harry is lazy, extravagant, and generally caddish. Ruth and John are both driven away by Harry, but the mother carries on until she discovers that Harry has forged her name and taken or lost everything ov value. Anna breaks down and sells what is left, and after Harry runs off, she becomes a wandering derelict. After she is struck by an automobile, John and Ruth come to her, bringing Ruth's child. Finally a reformed Harry returns, for a happy ending with the mother's arms around her children at the fade out.

== Cast ==
- Mary Carr as Anna Webb (prologue / play)
- Lynn Hammond as John Webb (prologue)
- Knox Kincaid as John (prologue)
- Joseph Monahan as Harry (prologue)
- Maybeth Carr as Ruth (prologue)
- Claude Brooke as Uncle Andrew (prologue / play)
- Robert Hazelton as The Minister (prologue)
- Florence Short as Widow Martin (prologue)
- May Kaiser as Her Child
- Percy Helton as John (play)
- Joseph Striker as Harry (play)
- Jane Thomas as Ruth (play)
- Roy Gordon as George Mills (play)
- Florence Haas as Little Anna (play)
- L. Rogers Lytton as Bank President (play) (as Roger Lytton)
- Ernest Hilliard as Jerry Gibbs (play)

== Preservation ==
With no prints of Silver Wings located in any film archives, it is considered a lost film.

== See also ==
- List of lost films
- 1937 Fox vault fire
