= Madonna of the Streets (1924 film) =

1924 film

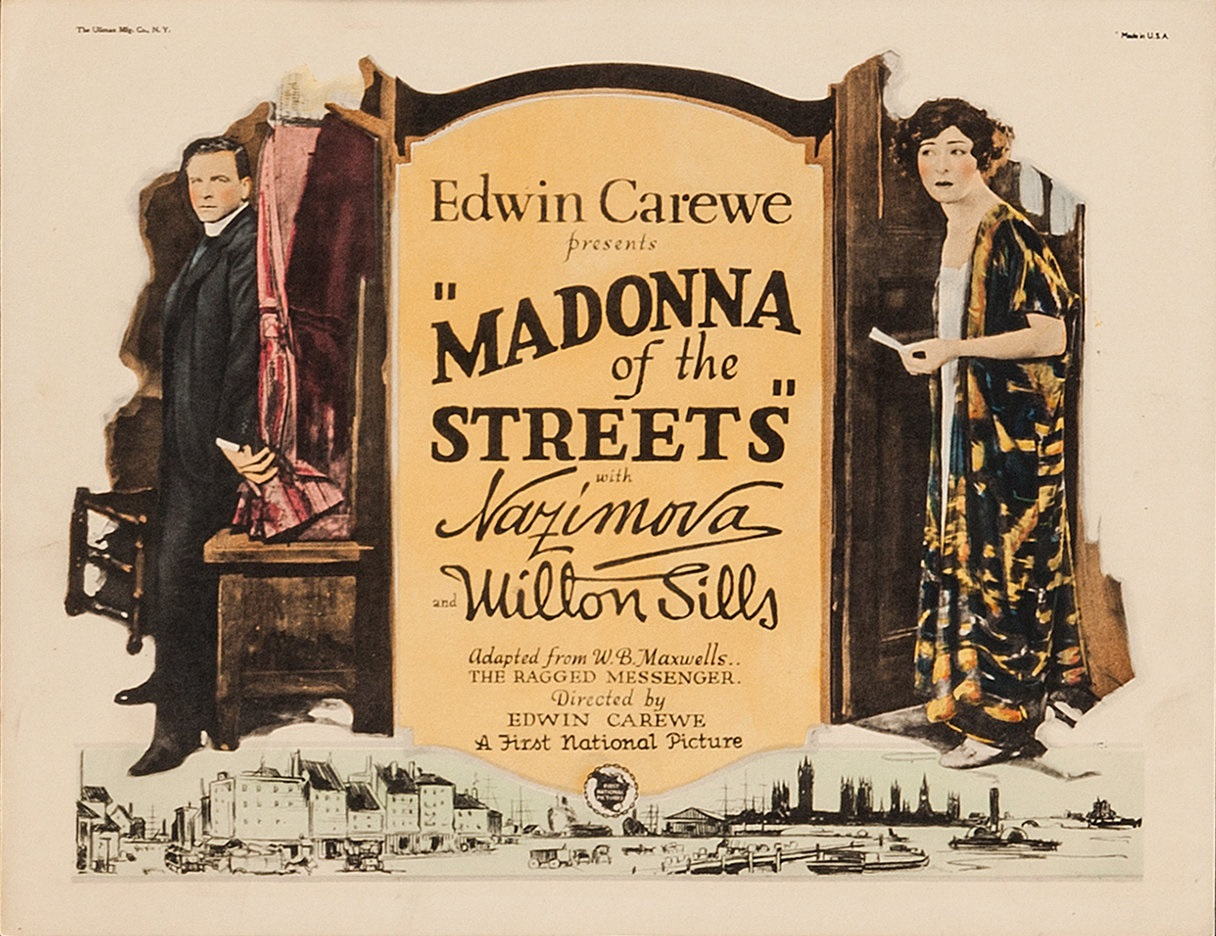
- Lobby card
- Directed by: Edwin Carewe
- Screenplay by: Frank Griffin; Frederic Hatton; Fanny Hatton
- Based on: The Ragged Messenger by W. B. Maxwell
- Produced by: Edwin Carewe
- Starring: Alla Nazimova; Milton Sills; Claude Gillingwater; Courtenay Foote; Wallace Beery; Anders Randolf
- Cinematography: Robert Kurrle
- Production company: Edwin Carewe Productions
- Distributed by: First National Pictures
- Release date: October 19, 1924
- Running time: 80 minutes
- Country: United States
- Language: English

Madonna of the Streets is a 1924 American drama film directed by Edwin Carewe and written by Frank Griffin, Frederic Hatton, and Fanny Hatton. It is based on the 1904 novel The Ragged Messenger by W. B. Maxwell. The film stars Alla Nazimova, Milton Sills, Claude Gillingwater, Courtenay Foote, Wallace Beery, and Anders Randolf. The film was released on October 19, 1924, by First National Pictures.

== Plot ==
Rev. John Morton, who is determined to follow as closely as possible the teachings of Jesus, inherits a considerable fortune when his uncle dies. Shortly thereafter he succumbs to the wiles of Mary Carlson and marries her. To Mary's dismay, John uses his money for charitable work. When John learns that not only has Mary been unfaithful to him but she was also his uncle's mistress and became Mrs. Morton in order to share the inheritance she believed to be rightfully hers, he sends her away with his secretary. Years later, John regrets his harshness; and he is reunited with Mary when she appears at a home for fallen women, which he is dedicating.

== Cast ==
- Alla Nazimova as Mary Carlson / Mary Ainsleigh
- Milton Sills as Reverend John Morton
- Claude Gillingwater as Lord Patrington
- Courtenay Foote as Dr. Colbeck
- Wallace Beery as Bill Smythe
- Anders Randolf as 'Bull' Morgan
- John T. Murray as 'Slippery' Eddie Foster
- Vivien Oakland as Lady Sarah Joyce
- Harold Goodwin as Walter Bowman
- Rosa Gore as Mrs. Elyard
- Maybeth Carr as Judy Smythe
- Herbert Prior as Nathan Norris
- Fred Kelsey
- Tom Kennedy

== Preservation ==
With no prints of Madonna of the Streets located in any film archives, it is a lost film.

== See also ==
- Madonna of the Streets (1930)
