= The Way of the Strong (1919 film) =

1919 American silent film directed by Edwin Carewe

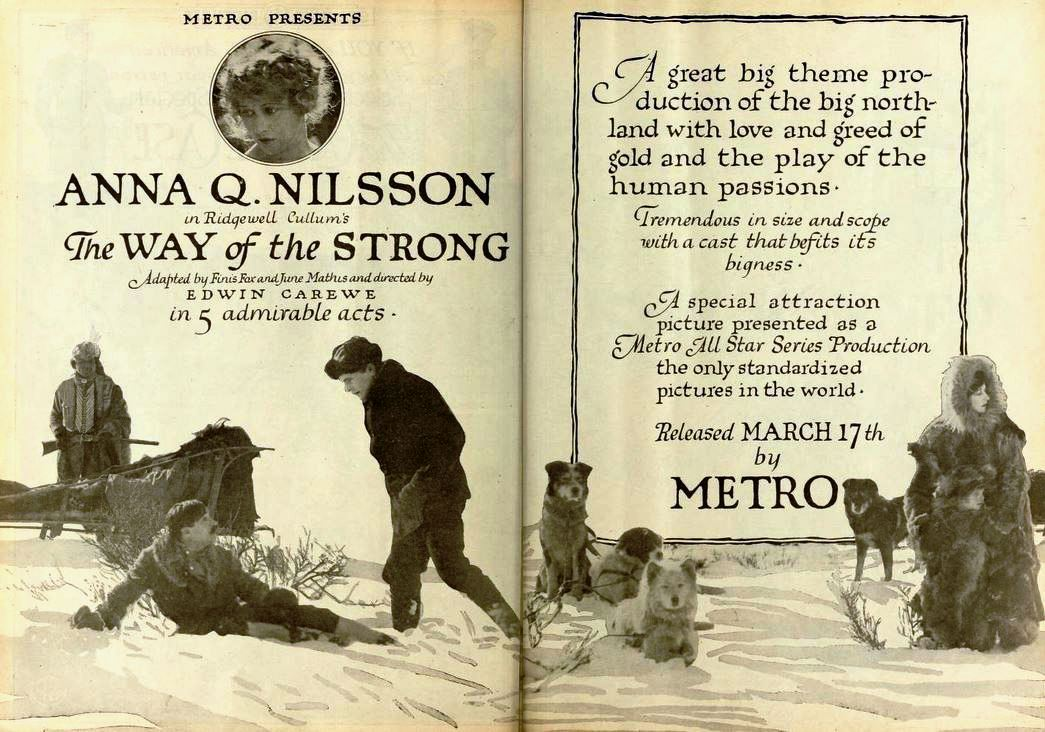
- Advertisement
- Directed by: Edwin Carewe
- Written by: June Mathis; Finis Fox
- Based on: the novel, The Way of the Strong by Ridgwell Cullum
- Produced by: Maxwell Karger
- Starring: Anna Q. Nilsson; Joseph King; Harry S. Northrup
- Cinematography: Rudolph Bergquist
- Production company: Metro Pictures
- Release date: March 17, 1919 (US)
- Running time: 5 reels
- Country: United States
- Language: Silent (English intertitles)

The Way of the Strong is a 1919 American silent drama film directed by Edwin Carewe and starring Anna Q. Nilsson, Joseph King, and Harry S. Northrup. It was released on March 17, 1919.

== Cast list ==
- Anna Q. Nilsson as Audrie Hendrie and Monica Norton
- Joseph King as Alexander Hendrie
- Harry S. Northrup as James Leyburn
- Irene Yeager as Frank Hendrie as a child
- Arthur Redden as Frank Hendrie six years later
- Rita Harlan as Norah

== Preservation ==
With no prints of Way of the Strong located in any film archives, it is considered a lost film.
