= The Web of Deceit =

1920 film directed by Edwin Carewe

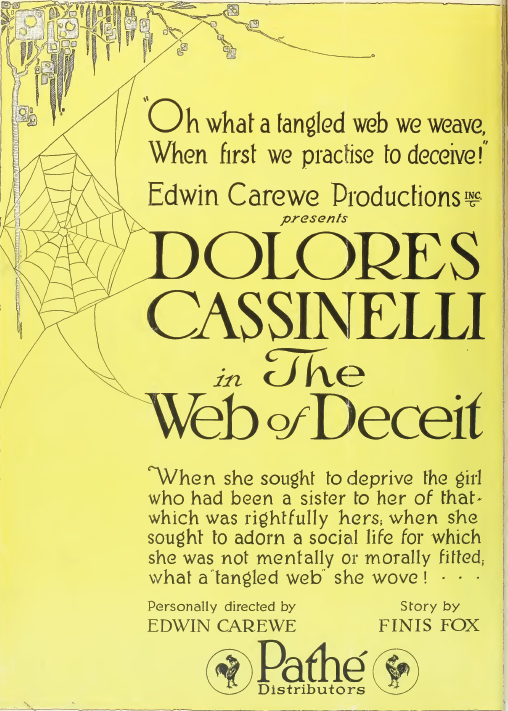
- Directed by: Edwin Carewe
- Written by: Finis Fox; Coolidge Streeter
- Produced by: Edwin Carewe
- Starring: Hugh Cameron; Dolores Cassinelli; Lettie Ford
- Production company: Edwin Carewe Productions
- Distributed by: Pathé Exchange
- Release date: January 18, 1920
- Country: United States
- Languages: Silent; English intertitles

The Web of Deceit is a 1920 American silent drama film directed by Edwin Carewe and starring Hugh Cameron, Dolores Cassinelli and Lettie Ford.

== Cast ==
- Hugh Cameron as Red Smith
- Dolores Cassinelli as Wanda Hubbard / Lucille Hubbard
- Lettie Ford as Emily Ann Hubbard
- Franklyn Hanna as Major Andrew Clarke
- Mitchell Harris as Roger Burney

== Preservation ==
At least some of Web of Deceit is extant and held by Archives du Film du CNC.

== Bibliography ==
- Lowe, Denise. An Encyclopedic Dictionary of Women in Early American Films: 1895-1930. Routledge, 2014.
