= Habit (1921 film) =

1921 film

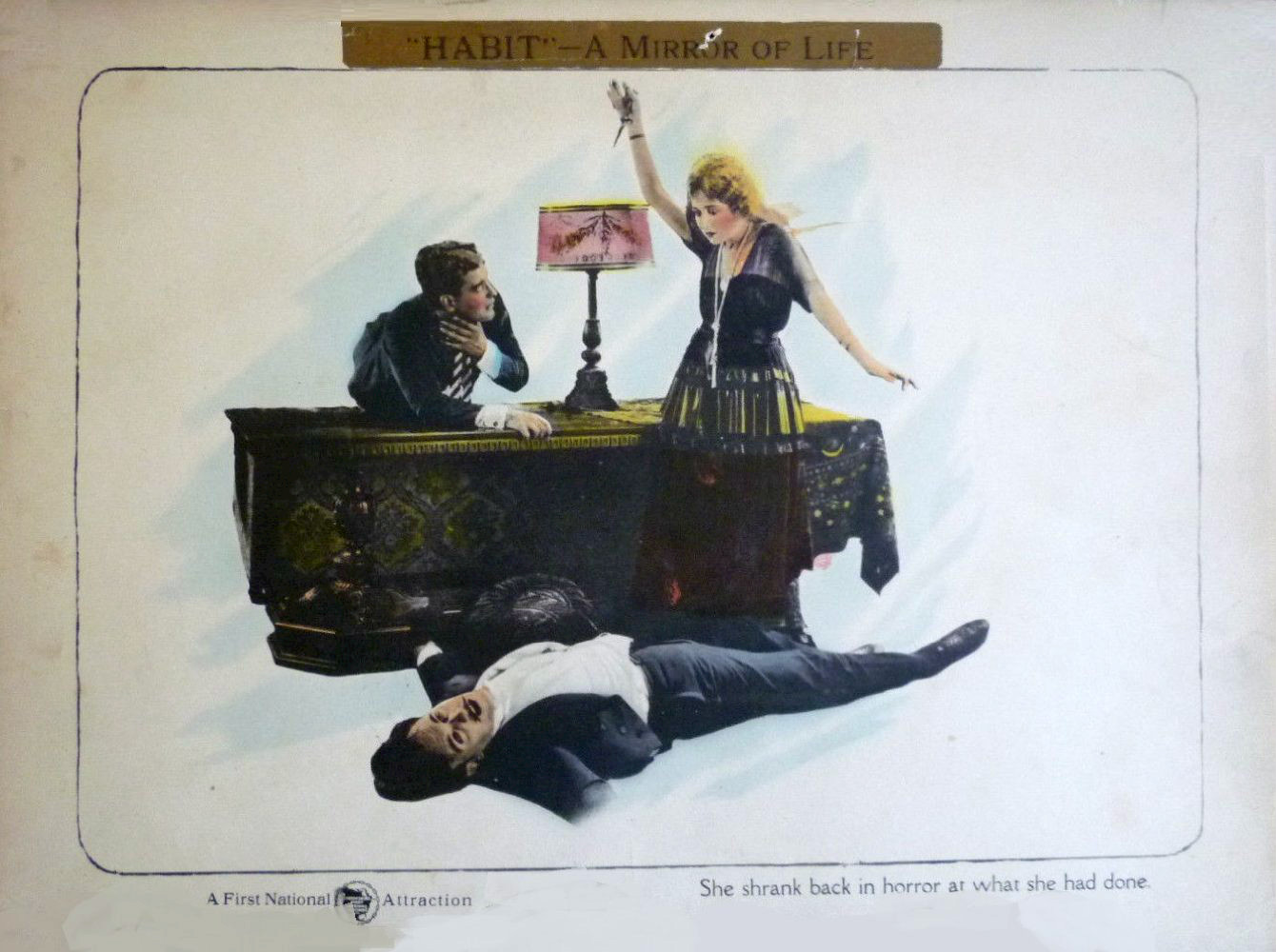
- Lobby card
- Directed by: Edwin Carewe
- Written by: Madge Tyrone (scenario)
- Based on: Habit by Tom Barry
- Produced by: Louis B. Mayer; Charlie Chaplin
- Starring: Mildred Harris
- Cinematography: Robert Kurrle
- Edited by: Edward McDermott
- Distributed by: Associated First National
- Release date: January 1921
- Running time: 6 reels
- Country: United States
- Language: Silent (English intertitles)

Habit is a 1921 American silent drama film directed by Edwin Carewe and written by Madge Tyrone based upon a play by Tom Barry. The film starred Mildred Harris.

== Cast ==
- Mildred Harris as Irene Fletcher
- W. E. Lawrence as John Marshall (credited as William Lawrence)
- Ethel Grey Terry as Mary Chartres
- Walter McGrail as Charles Munson
- Emmett King as Richard Fletcher (credited as Emmet C. King)

== Preservation ==
With no prints of Habit located in any film archives, it is considered a lost film.
