= A Question of Honor (1922 film) =

1922 film

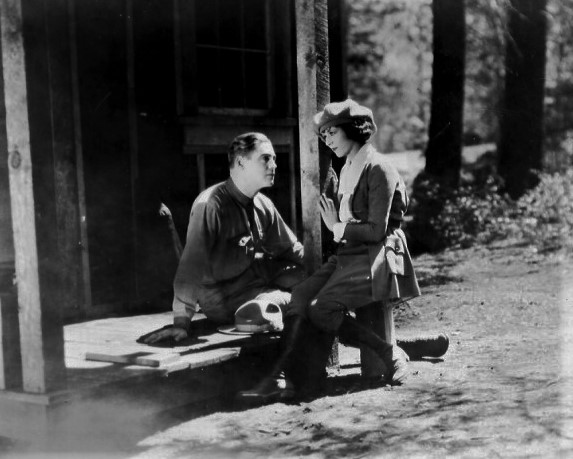
- Still with Guy Edward Hearn and Anita Stewart
- Directed by: Edwin Carewe
- Screenplay by: Josephine Quirk
- Based on: A Question of Honor by Ruth Cross
- Starring: Anita Stewart; Guy Edward Hearn; Arthur Stuart Hull; Walt Whitman; Bert Sprotte; Frank Beal
- Cinematography: Robert Kurrle
- Production companies: Anita Stewart Productions; Louis B. Mayer Productions
- Distributed by: Associated First National Pictures
- Release date: March 11, 1922
- Running time: 70 minutes
- Country: United States
- Language: Silent (English intertitles)

A Question of Honor is a 1922 American drama film directed by Edwin Carewe and written by Josephine Quirk. The film stars Anita Stewart, Guy Edward Hearn, Arthur Stuart Hull, Walt Whitman, Bert Sprotte, and Frank Beal. The film was released on March 11, 1922, by Associated First National Pictures.

== Plot ==
As described in a film magazine, Anne Wilmot and her aunt Katherine leave Fifth Avenue to go to Arizona and spend a month at her fiance Leon Morse's lodge in the mountains near an immense hydroelectric engineering project. Leon is determined to obtain a right-of-way across the site occupied by the dam for his railroad, but Bill Shannon, the builder, has other views about it. Anne meets Bill when he rescues her from a perilous position on a rock endangered by the rising waters of a stream. Sheb, his right hand man, warns Bill against all women, but he gives Anne some food when she pleads hunger and then makes her wash the dishes. Charles Burkthaler, hired by Leon to destroy the dam, places his men at crucial points. Anne notifies Bill of their scheme and cuts the wire to prevent them from blowing up the dam. A tunnel, however, is destroyed, and Anne is caught under the debris. Sheb finds her and takes her to Bill's cabin. Bill then learns that she has broken her engagement with Leon and says that he is satisfied to spend his life with her.

== Cast ==
- Anita Stewart as Anne Wilmot
- Guy Edward Hearn as Bill Shannon
- Arthur Stuart Hull as Leon Morse
- Walt Whitman as Sheb
- Bert Sprotte as Charles Burkthaler
- Frank Beal as Stephen Douglas
- Adele Farrington as Mrs. Katherine Wilmot
- Mary Land as Mrs. Elton
- Ed Brady as John Bretton
- Walter Bytell as Parsons

== Production ==
Production began on A Question of Honor in May 1921. Assistant director Wallace Fox was sent up to Belden, California to arrange filming exteriors at the mining camp, and the dam scenes were made at the Lake Almanor. Interior scenes were made at the Louis B. Mayer Studios. Filming was completed in July.

== Preservation ==
With no prints of A Question of Honor located in any film archives, it is considered a lost film.
