= The Lady Who Lied =

1925 film by Edwin Carewe

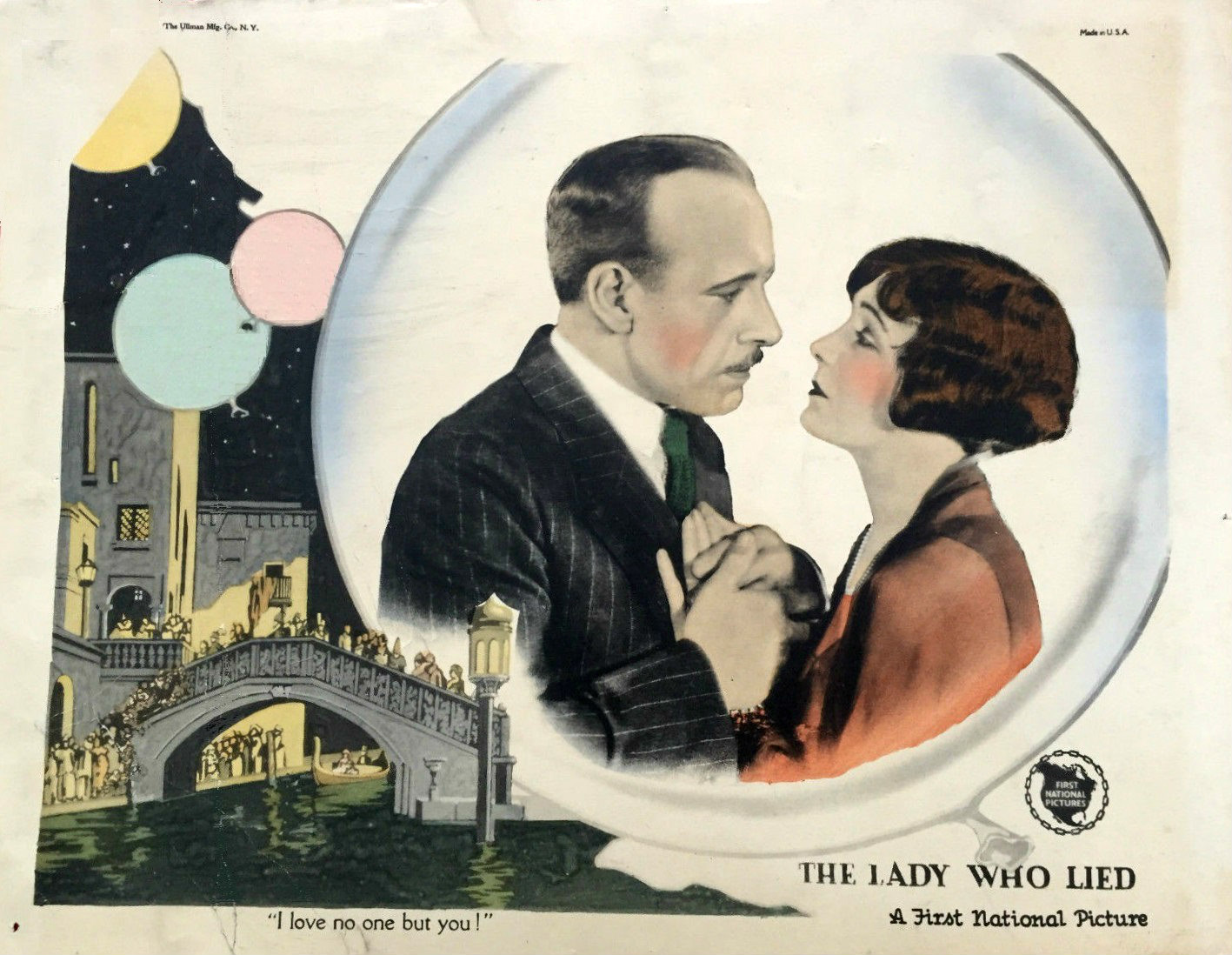
- Lobby card
- Directed by: Edwin Carewe
- Written by: Madge Tyrone; Lois Leeson
- Based on: Snake Bite by Robert Hichens
- Produced by: First National Pictures; Edwin Carewe
- Starring: Virginia Valli; Nita Naldi; Lewis Stone
- Cinematography: Robert Kurrle; Al Green (additional photography)
- Edited by: LeRoy Stone
- Distributed by: First National Pictures
- Release date: July 12, 1925
- Running time: 8 reels; 7,111 feet
- Country: United States
- Language: Silent (English intertitles)

The Lady Who Lied is a 1925 American silent melodrama film produced and distributed by First National Pictures and based on a novel by Robert Hichens. Edwin Carewe directed, and Lewis Stone, Virginia Valli, and Nita Naldi star. The film has the distinction of being the feature attraction of the gala opening of the Uptown Theatre in Chicago, Illinois, on August 18, 1925.

== Plot ==
As described in a film magazine review, Fay Kennion becomes engaged to Horace Pierpont, but breaks the engagement when she sees the young woman Fifi in a negligee in Horace's Venice hotel apartment. She goes to Beni-Mora in the Sahara where, to spite her former lover, she marries Dr. Alan Mortimer, who had long been in love with her. Horace follows her and, when Fay learns that the woman in the apartment in Venice had been trying to blackmail him, their friendship is renewed. Horace takes Fay and her husband on a trip across the desert. Alan's suspicions are aroused and, when Horace is bitten by a snake, he refuses to provide medical aid until he learns the truth about the relations between his wife and her former lover. They both lie at first, but then Horace insists on telling the truth before allowing Alan to save him from death from the snakebite. The former lovers separate, and the husband and wife start back towards Beni-Mora. While in route they are waylaid by desert bandits who kill Alan, leaving Fay free to follow her heart with Horace.

== Cast ==
- Lewis Stone as Horace Pierpont
- Virginia Valli as Fay Kennion
- Louis Payne as Sir Henry Kennion
- Nita Naldi as Fifi
- Edward Earle as Alan Mortimer
- Leo White as Valet
- Purnell Pratt as Ahmed
- Sam Appel as Saad Ben Youssof
- Zalla Zarana as Zetta
- George J. Lewis as Mahmud (credited as George Lewis)
- Edna May Oliver (uncredited)
- Gilbert Roland (uncredited)
- Claire Windsor (uncredited)

== Production ==
Desert scenes for The Lady Who Lied were filmed on location near Saugus.

== Preservation ==
With no prints of The Lady Who Lied located in any film archives, it is a lost film.
