= A Son of the Sahara =

1924 film by Edwin Carewe

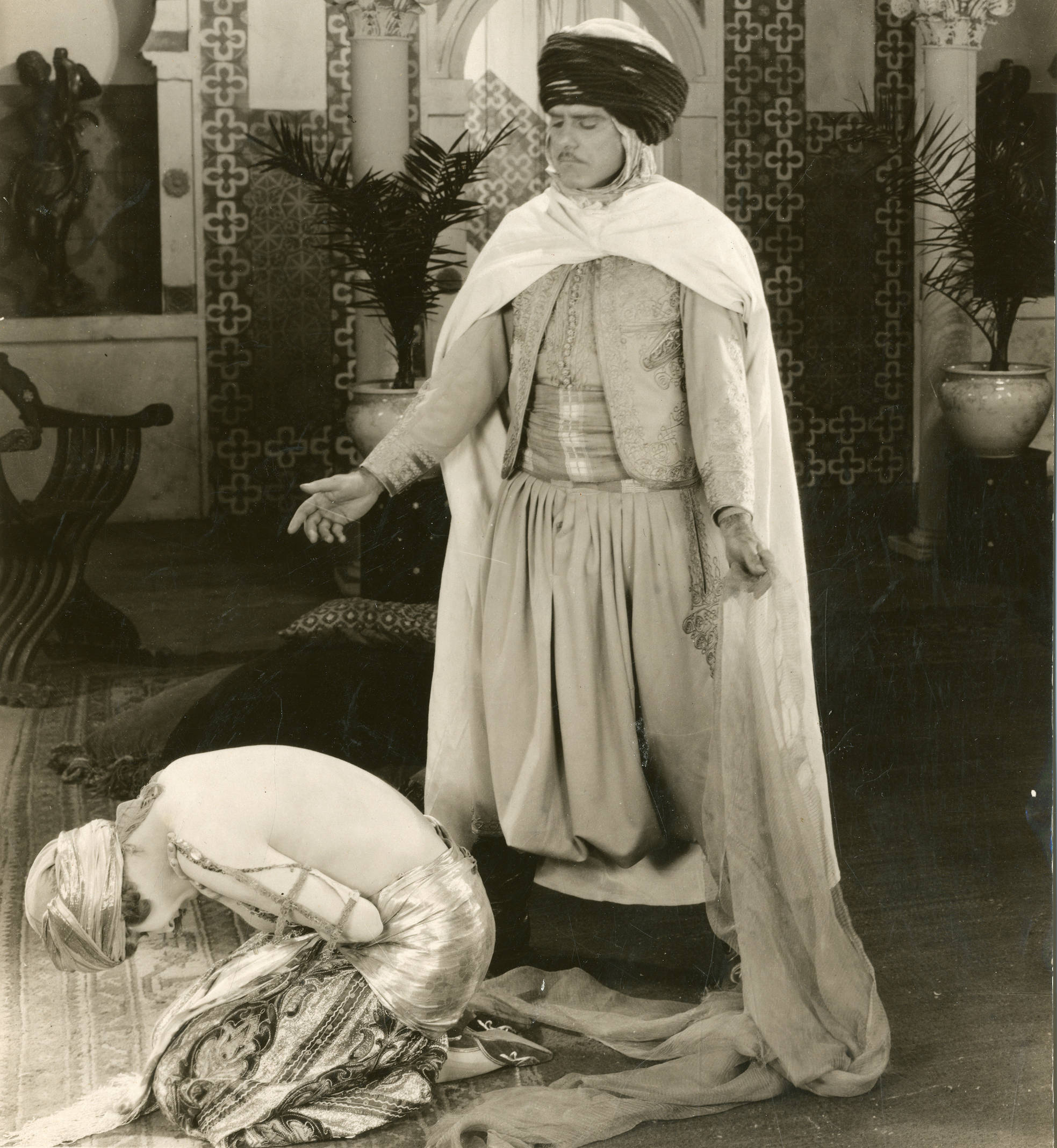
- Film still
- Directed by: Edwin Carewe; René Plaissetty
- Written by: Adelaide Heilbron (scenario)
- Based on: A Son of the Sahara by Louise Gerard
- Produced by: Edwin Carewe
- Starring: Claire Windsor; Bert Lytell
- Cinematography: Robert Kurrle; Al M. Greene
- Edited by: Robert De Lacey
- Distributed by: Associated First National
- Release date: April 13, 1924
- Running time: 80 minutes
- Country: United States
- Language: Silent (English intertitles)

A Son of the Sahara is a 1924 American silent drama film produced and directed by Edwin Carewe and co-directed with René Plaissetty. It stars Claire Windsor and Bert Lytell. First National handled the distribution of the film.

== Plot ==
As described in a film magazine review, Raoul Le Breton is brought up as the son of a sheik of an Arab tribe, although he has been to college. He falls in love with Barbara Barbier, who first accepts and later dismisses him when she learns of his native birth. Back in the desert, Raoul plans his revenge. In a raid he captures Barbara, her father, and Captain Jean Duval, who is a rival. She is sold as a slave but is secretly purchased by Raoul. French troops rescue the captives, but in the meantime it transpires that Raoul is the offspring of white parents, and he and Barbara find happiness together.

== Cast ==
- Claire Windsor as Barbara Barbier
- Bert Lytell as Raoul Le Breton [Cassim Ammeh]
- Walter McGrail as Capt. Jean Duval
- Rosemary Theby as Rayma
- Marise Dorval as Annette Le Breton
- Montagu Love as Sultan Cassim Ammeh / Colonel Barbier
- Paul Panzer as Cassim Sr.'s lieutenant / Cassim Jr.'s lieutenant / auctioneer
- Georges Chebat as Raoul as a boy
- Madame De Castilo

== Production ==
A Son of the Sahara was shot on location in Algeria with an American cast.

== Critical review ==
Of the "Sheik" films of the 1920s, the plot of A Son of the Sahara was among the more racist in that Barbara, the European woman, completely rejects any romantic interest in Raoul until the very end of the film where it is established that he lacks any Arab ancestry and is fully French.

== Preservation ==
With no copies of A Son of the Sahara located in any film archives, it is a lost film. However, a trailer of the film survives in the Library of Congress.

== See also ==
- Racism in early American film
