= Rio Grande (1920 film) =

1920 film

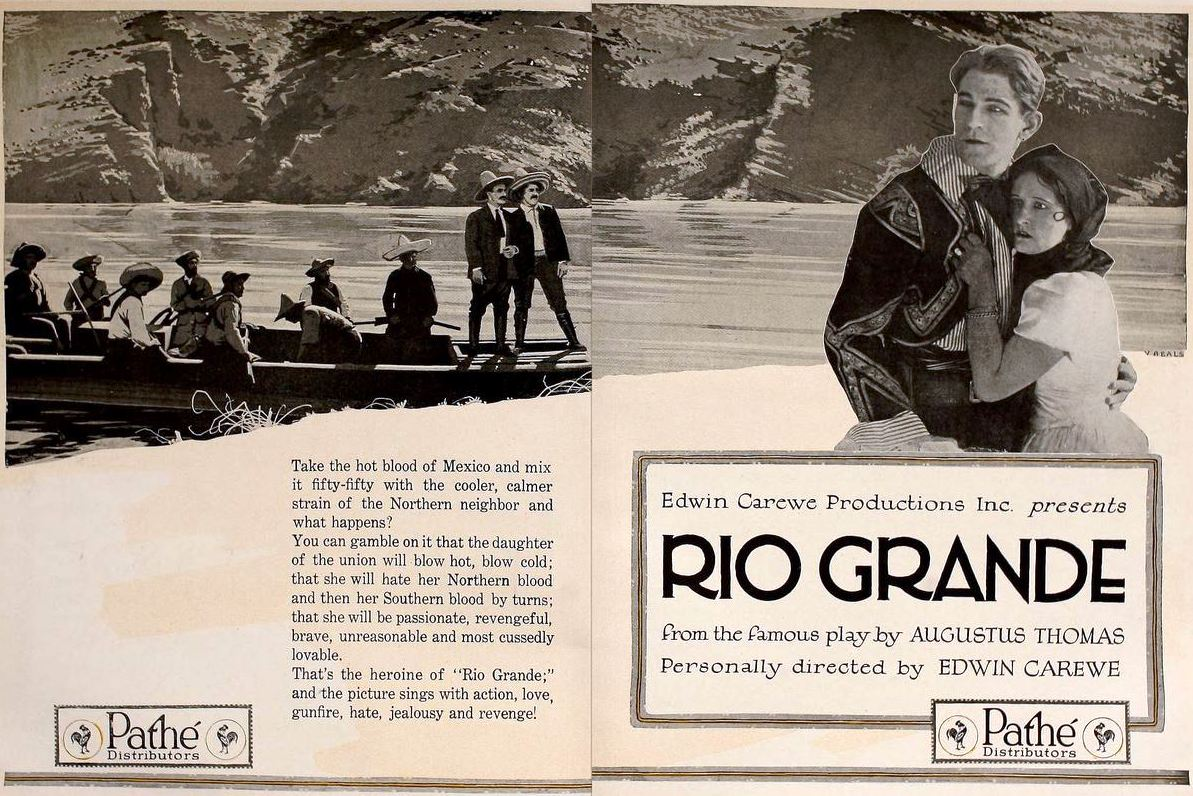
- Directed by: Edwin Carewe
- Written by: Madge Tyrone; Edwin Carewe
- Based on: Rio Grande by Augustus Thomas
- Starring: Rosemary Theby; Allan Sears; Georgie Stone
- Cinematography: Robert Kurrle
- Production company: Edwin Carewe Productions
- Distributed by: Pathé Exchange
- Release date: April 25, 1920
- Running time: 7 reels
- Country: United States
- Languages: Silent; English intertitles

Rio Grande is a 1920 American silent Western film directed by Edwin Carewe and starring Rosemary Theby, Allan Sears, and Georgie Stone.

== Cast ==
- Rosemary Theby as Maria Inez
- Allan Sears as Danny O'Neil
- Georgie Stone as Danny O'Neil at 8 years old
- Peaches Jackson as Maria Inez, 6 years
- Hector V. Sarno as Felipe Lopez
- Adele Farrington as Alice Lopez
- Arthur Edmund Carewe as Don Jose Alvarado
- Harry Duffield as Father O'Brien

== Preservation ==
With no prints of Rio Grande located in any film archives, it is considered a lost film.

== Bibliography ==
- Goble, Alan. The Complete Index to Literary Sources in Film. Walter de Gruyter, 1999.
