= The Invisible Fear =

1921 film

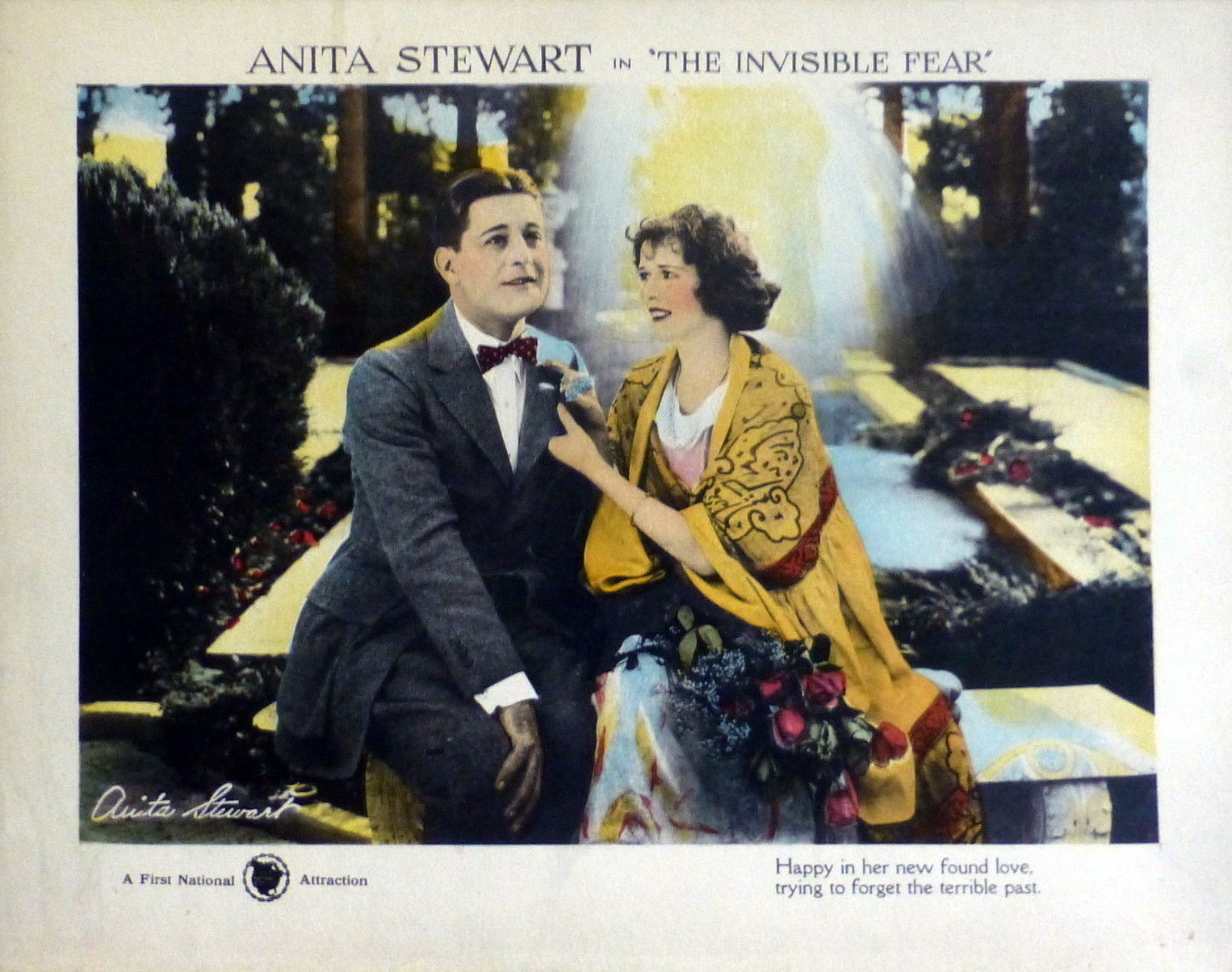
- Lobby card
- Directed by: Edwin Carewe; Clarence Bricker (assistant)
- Written by: Hampton Del Ruth (story); Madge Tyrone (scenario)
- Produced by: Anita Stewart; Louis B. Mayer
- Starring: Anita Stewart
- Cinematography: Robert B. Kurrle
- Distributed by: First National; Gaumont (France; 1924)
- Release date: October 10, 1921 (USA)
- Running time: 60 minutes
- Country: United States
- Language: Silent (English intertitles)

The Invisible Fear is a 1921 American silent mystery film directed by Edwin Carewe and starring Anita Stewart. It was produced by Stewart and Louis B. Mayer with release through First National Pictures.

== Plot ==
As described in a film magazine, Sylvia Langdon is engaged to Bentley Arnold. Her hand is also sought by Arthur Comstock, a nephew of John Randall, who is a partner of Marshall Arnold. Sylvia accompanies Arthur on a paper chase from the country club but is thrown from her horse. A storm overtakes them and they seek refuge in a lodge. Here Arthur attempts to make love to Sylvia and during a violent quarrel she hits him on the head with a heavy candlestick. She flees from the lodge and, turning back, finds it engulfed in flames. John Randall discovers that Arthur has taken a will from his desk and sets out to find him. An accident happens and Randall is reported killed. Sylvia and Bentley are married. She gives a party on her birthday at which Arthur Comstock appears. She is transfixed with horror at the sight of him and runs to her room where she finds the candlestick on her dresser. That night, hypnotized by candle holder, she opens the family safe and takes out the jewels. Arthur seizes them but is in turn seized by detectives that had been hidden in the house by Bentley. A confession from the Japanese butler Nagi reveals that Arthur Comstock murdered Randall and left his body to be consumed in the lodge fire. Sylvia is just freed from the invisible fear that she had killed Arthur.

== Cast ==
- Anita Stewart as Sylvia Langdon
- Walter McGrail as Arthur Comstock
- Allan Forrest as Bentley Arnold
- Hamilton Morse as Marshall Arnold
- Estelle Evans as Mrs. Marshall Arnold
- George Kuwa as Nagi
- Edward Hunt as Butler
- Ogden Crane as John Randall

== Preservation ==
With no prints of The Invisible Fear located in any film archives, it is considered a lost film.
