= Lawyer Man =

1932 film

- Theatrical poster
- Directed by: William Dieterle
- Screenplay by: Rian James; James Seymour; Wilson Mizner
- Based on: Lawyer Man; 1932 novel by Max Trell
- Starring: William Powell; Joan Blondell
- Cinematography: Robert Kurrle
- Edited by: Thomas Pratt
- Music by: Bernhard Kaun
- Production company: Warner Bros. Pictures
- Distributed by: Warner Bros. Pictures
- Release date: December 24, 1932 (New York City)
- Running time: 68 minutes
- Country: United States
- Language: English

Lawyer Man is a 1932 American pre-Code drama film directed by William Dieterle, based on the novel by Max Trell. The film stars William Powell and Joan Blondell. It was produced by Warner Bros. Pictures. By the time of the release, several actors were credited in the studio, but were not seen in the film. These include Edward Arnold, Harold Huber and Henry Armetta.

== Plot ==
Anton Adam is a lawyer from the Lower East Side of New York City who has just got a client acquitted against the well-established uptown attorney Granville Bentley. Bentley admires Adam's work as a litigator and offers the poorer lawyer a partnership. Adam accepts. Adam's faithful secretary Olga Michaels isn't delighted to see Adam make the move. Adam had meanwhile turned down an offer to work for local party boss Gilmurry.

Adam's downfall comes when he meets the beautiful actress Virginia St. Johns, who is introduced as a woman whose fiancé, associated with Gilmurry, has abandoned her. She provides Adam with love letters that he believes will win her a large amount in a breach of promise suit. Adam sues Dr. Gresham, but Virginia soon phones Adam to say she wants to drop the suit. Adam heatedly responds that the case has gone too far to stop now, which Virginia records. The love letters are stolen from Adam's desk. Now Adam is sued for filing a fraudulent case. The trial ends with a hung jury, but he loses his reputation and his partnership with Bentley, so he decides to become the ruthless attorney that the public imagines him to be.

Adam eventually gets Gilmurry to recommend him for a position as an assistant district attorney, where he gets his revenge by prosecuting Gresham and his corrupt brother, a judge, for fraud against the city. Gilmurry then offers Adam the open judgeship, but Adam turns him down rather than become a party hack. With only his admiring secretary by his side, Anton returns to his old neighborhood to reestablish an honest legal practice. The film's title comes from what a neighborhood boy calls Adam.

== Cast ==
- William Powell as Anton "Tony" Adam
- Joan Blondell as Olga Michaels
- David Landau as John Gilmurry
- Helen Vinson as Barbara Bentley
- Claire Dodd as Virginia St. Johns
- Alan Dinehart as Granville Bentley
- Allen Jenkins as Izzy Levine
- Jack LaRue as Spike Murphy (uncredited)
- Sterling Holloway as Olga's drinking companion (uncredited)
- Roscoe Karns as Merritt-Reporter (uncredited)
