= The Stronger Will =

1928 film

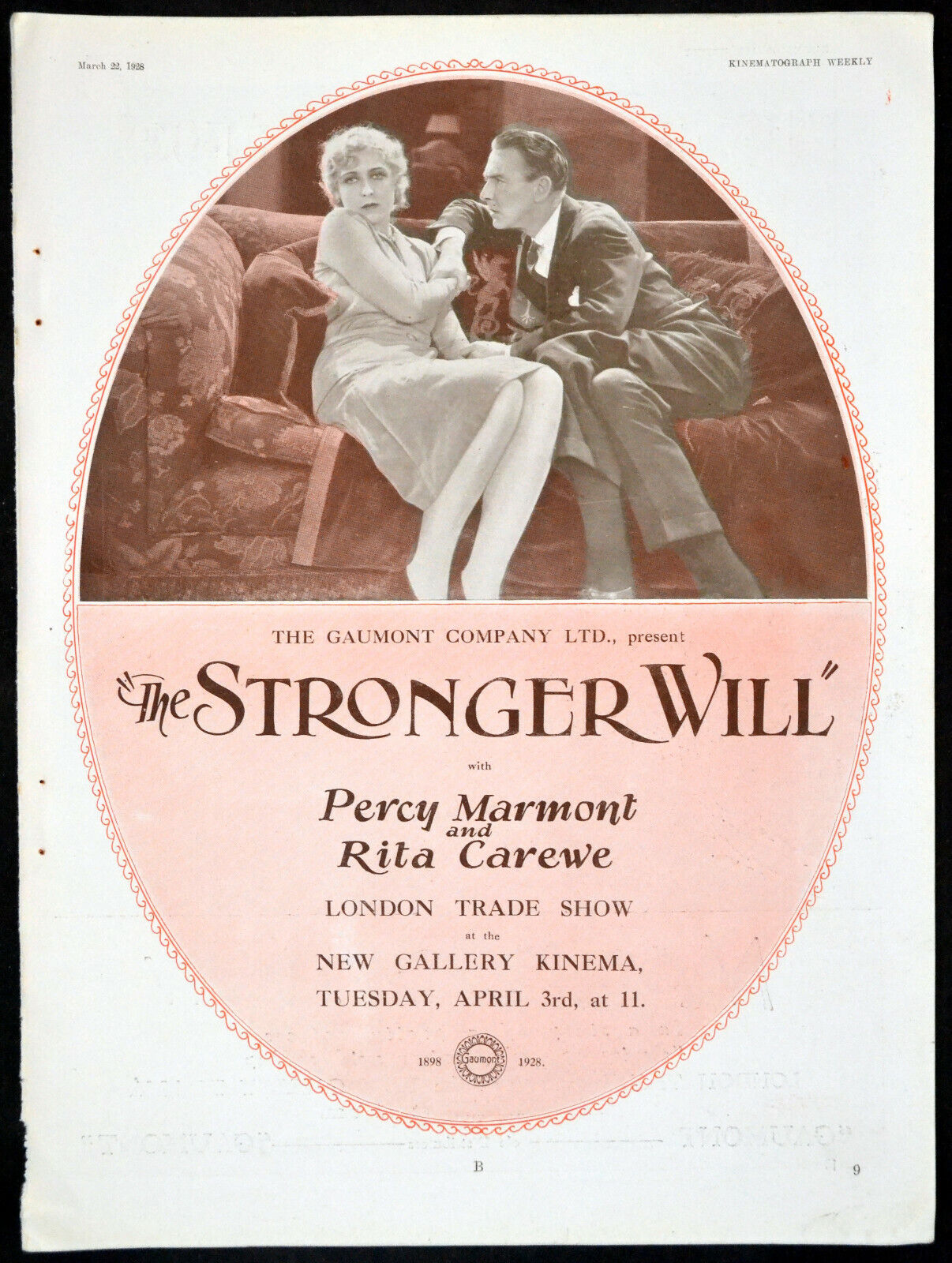
- Directed by: Bernard McEveety
- Written by: Adrian Johnson; Harry Chandlee
- Produced by: Samuel Zierler
- Starring: Percy Marmont; Rita Carewe; Howard Truesdale
- Cinematography: Arthur Reeves
- Production company: Excellent Pictures
- Distributed by: Excellent Pictures
- Release date: February 20, 1928
- Running time: 60 minutes
- Country: United States
- Languages: Silent; English intertitles

The Stronger Will is a 1928 American silent drama film directed by Bernard McEveety and starring Percy Marmont, Rita Carewe and Howard Truesdale.

== Synopsis ==
A Wall Street financier's wife becomes involved with a rival businessman.

== Cast ==
- Percy Marmont as Clive Morton
- Rita Carewe as Estelle Marsh
- Howard Truesdale as Stephen Marsh
- Merle Farris as Marguerite Marsh
- William Bailey as Ralph Walker
- Erin La Bissoniere as Muriel Cassano

== Bibliography ==
- Munden, Kenneth White. The American Film Institute Catalog of Motion Pictures Produced in the United States, Part 1. University of California Press, 1997.
