= Are We Civilized? =

1934 film by Edwin Carewe

- Directed by: Edwin Carewe
- Written by: Harold Sherman (writer)
- Produced by: Edwin Carewe (producer)
- Starring: See below
- Cinematography: Al Green; Leon Shamroy
- Edited by: Dan Milner
- Music by: Matthew Ray; Mussina Wachtel
- Production company: Raspin Productions
- Distributed by: Raspin Productions
- Release date: June 6, 1934
- Running time: 70 minutes
- Country: United States
- Language: English

Are We Civilized? is an independently released 1934 pre-Code American social problem film directed by Edwin Carewe which constituted a veiled attack on Adolf Hitler. The film was given a negative review by Time magazine upon its release. Footage of dinosaurs in the film are recycled from the 1918 Willis H. O'Brien's film The Ghost of Slumber Mountain.

== Plot ==
Paul is a European who served during the Great War, and has since emigrated to the United States. One day he returns to Europe and talks of freedom and liberty. The authorities (clearly based on German Nazis but unnamed) come down on him. It is their duty to spread racism and religious hatred. Paul gives the speech of a lifetime set against an epic series of films spread across the history of mankind.

== Cast ==
- William Farnum as Paul Franklin, Sr.
- Anita Louise as Norma Bockner
- Frank McGlynn Sr. as Abraham Lincoln, Felix Bockner
- LeRoy Mason as Paul Franklin Jr.
- Oscar Apfel as Dr. Leonard Gear
- Stuart Holmes as Col. Salter
- Alin Cavin as Moses
- Conrad Seideman as Buddha
- Sidney T. Pink as Confucius
- Harry Burkhardt as Caesar
- Charles Requa as Christ
- J.C. Fowler as Mohammed
- Bert Lindley as Christopher Columbus
- Aaron Edwards as George Washington
- William Humphrey as Napoleon
