= Why Women Love =

1925 film by Edwin Carewe

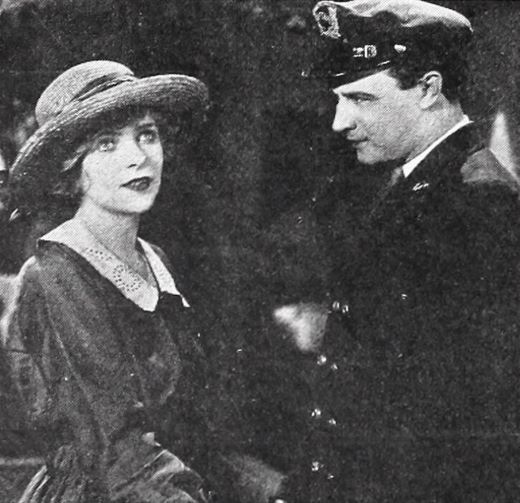
- Still with Blanche Sweet and Robert Frazer
- Directed by: Edwin Carewe
- Written by: Lois Leeson (adaptation); Ralph Spence (intertitles)
- Screenplay by: Lois Leeson
- Based on: The Sea Woman by Willard Robertson
- Produced by: Edwin Carewe
- Starring: Blanche Sweet
- Cinematography: Robert Kurrle; Al M. Green
- Edited by: Edward McDermott
- Production company: Edwin Carewe Productions
- Distributed by: First National Pictures
- Release date: October 18, 1925
- Running time: 70 minutes
- Country: United States
- Language: Silent (English intertitles)

Why Women Love (also known as Sea Woman) is a 1925 American silent drama film produced and directed by Edwin Carewe and distributed by First National Pictures. Blanche Sweet starred in the film which was based on the Broadway play The Sea Woman, by Willard Robertson.

== Plot ==
As described in a film magazine review, a young woman whose lover is a sea captain is reported lost at sea when fire destroys her father’s ship. In reality, the young woman has been rescued and has undertaken to care for the daughter of her rescuer, who was a lighthouse keeper. After a series of thrilling adventures revolving around the lighthouse keeper’s daughter, the young woman and her lover are reunited.

== Cast ==
- Blanche Sweet as Molla Hansen
- Bert Sprotte as Olaf Hansen, Molla's father
- Robert Frazer as Captain Rodney O'Malley
- Charles Murray as Josiah 'Jerry' Scott
- Russell Simpson as Silas Martin, the Lighthouse Keeper
- Dorothy Sebastian as Pearl, His Daughter
- Alan Roscoe as Charley Watts
- Fred Warren as Johnny Hickey
- Edward Earle as Ira Meers, The Engineer

== Production ==
The film's working title was Barriers Aflame. An alternative title was The Sea Woman. The film was shot on location at Point Lobos in Monterey County, California.

== Preservation ==
With no prints of Why Women Love located in any film archives, it is considered a lost film.
