= Resurrection (1927 film) =

1927 film by Edwin Carewe

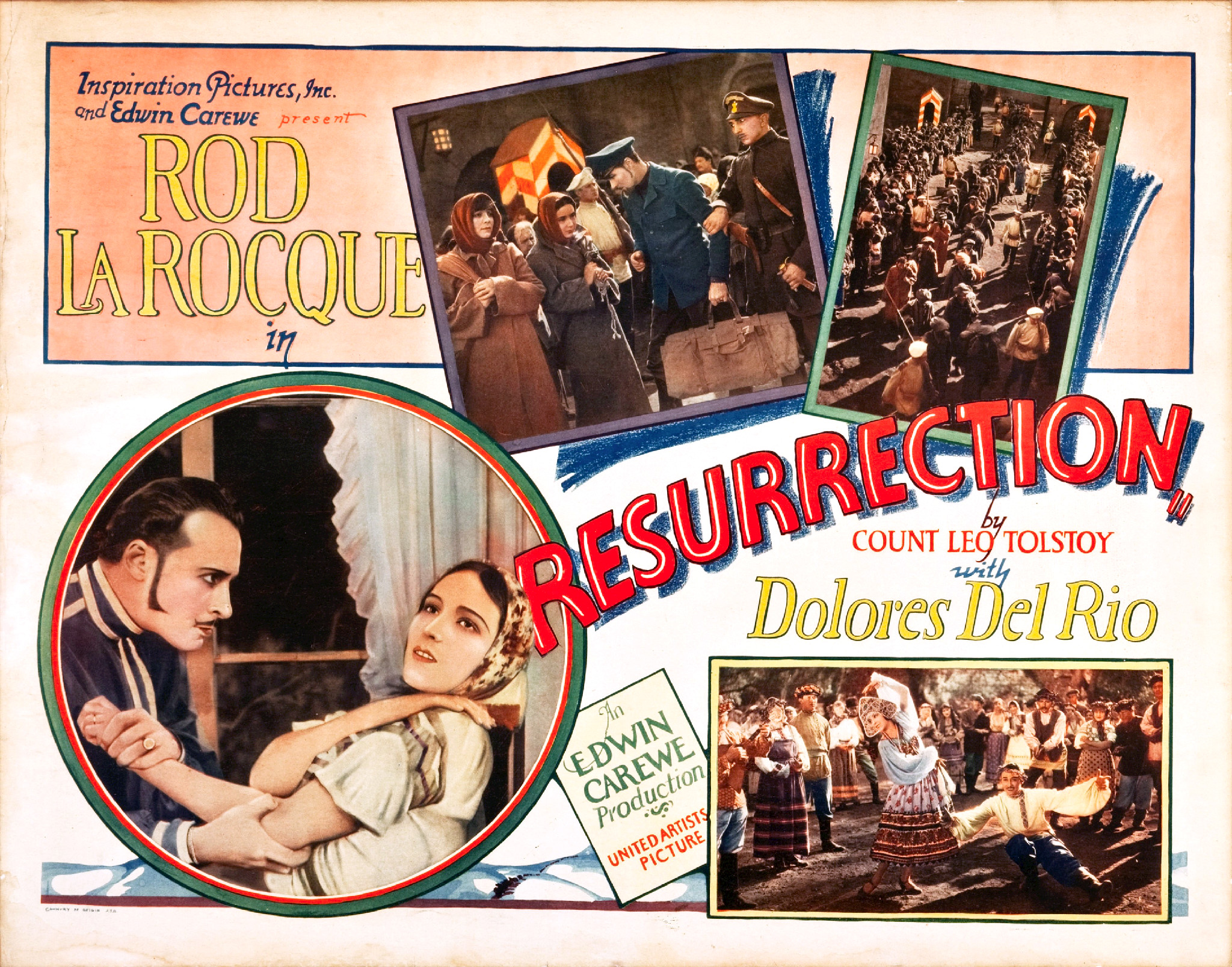
- Film poster
- Directed by: Edwin Carewe
- Written by: Edwin Carewe; Finis Fox
- Based on: Resurrection by Leo Tolstoy
- Produced by: Edwin Carewe Productions
- Starring: Dolores del Río; Rod La Rocque; Rita Carewe; Marc McDermott
- Cinematography: Robert Kurrle
- Edited by: Jeanne Spencer
- Distributed by: United Artists
- Release date: March 19, 1927
- Running time: 100 minutes
- Country: United States
- Languages: Silent Version; Sound Version (Synchronized) (English Intertitles)

Resurrection is a 1927 American romantic drama film directed by Edwin Carewe, based on Leo Tolstoy's 1899 novel Resurrection. The film is a feature-length silent production starring Dolores del Río and featuring an appearance by Ilya Tolstoy who co-wrote the script. In 1928, due to the public apathy towards silent films, a sound version was also produced with a newly filmed prologue in which the theme song "Russian Lullaby" was performed and sung. While the actual film had no audible dialog, it was released with a synchronized musical score with sound effects using both the sound-on-disc and sound-on-film process. In 1931, Carewe directed an all-talking remake of the film starred by Lupe Vélez.

The film's premiere was held at the Mark Strand Theatre in Manhattan on May 15, 1927.

== Plot ==
Katyusha, a country girl, is seduced and abandoned by Prince Dimitry. Dimitry finds himself, years later, on a jury trying the same Katyusha for a crime he now realizes his actions drove her to. He follows her to imprisonment in Siberia, intent on redeeming her and himself as well.

== Cast ==
- Dolores del Río as Katyusha Maslova
- Rod La Rocque as Prince Dimitry Ivanich
- Lucy Beaumont as Aunt Sophya
- Vera Lewis as Aunt Marya
- Marc McDermott as Major Schoenboch
- Clarissa Selwynne as Princess Olga Ivanovitch Nekhludof
- Eve Southern as Princess Sonia Korchagin
- Ilya Tolstoy as The Old Philosopher
- Bobby White - (uncredited)

== Music ==
The sound version featured a theme song entitled “Russian Lullaby” by Irving Berlin. The soundtrack also featured the song “Brown Eyes” by P. Ouglitzky.

== Preservation ==
Resurrection is currently presumed lost. In February of 2021, the film was cited by the National Film Preservation Board on their Lost U.S. Silent Feature Films list.
