= Ramona (1928 film) =

1928 film

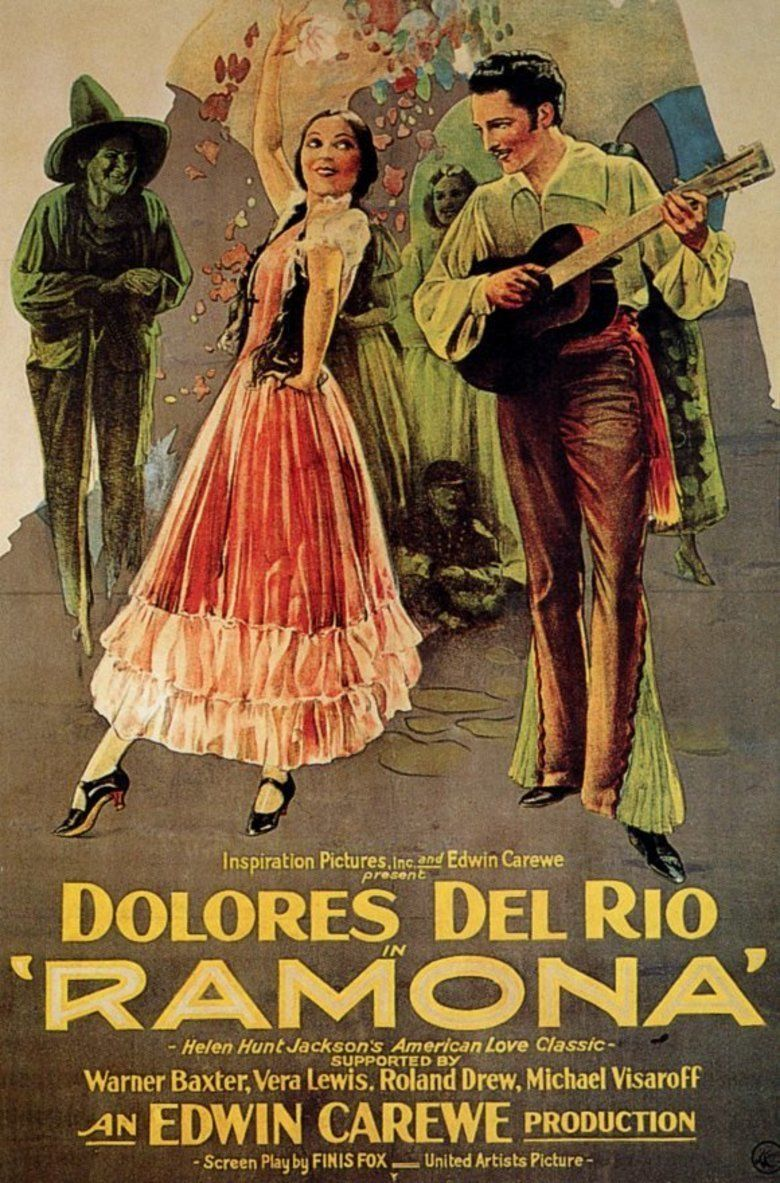
- Film poster
- Directed by: Edwin Carewe
- Written by: Finis Fox
- Based on: Ramona; 1884 novel by Helen Hunt Jackson
- Starring: Dolores del Río; Warner Baxter
- Cinematography: Robert Kurrle
- Edited by: Jeanne Spencer
- Music by: "Ramona" by Mabel Wayne and L. Wolfe Gilbert
- Production company: Inspiration Pictures
- Distributed by: United Artists
- Release dates: May 12, 1928 (New York City, premiere)
- Running time: 80 minutes
- Country: United States
- Languages: Sound (Synchronized) (English intertitles)
- Box office: $1.5 million

Ramona is a 1928 American synchronized sound drama film directed by Edwin Carewe, based on Helen Hunt Jackson's 1884 novel Ramona, and starring Dolores del Río and Warner Baxter. While the film has no audible dialogue, it was released with a synchronized musical score with sound effects using both the sound-on-disc and sound-on-film process. This was the first United Artists film to be released with a recorded soundtrack. The novel had been previously filmed by D. W. Griffith in 1910 with Mary Pickford, remade in 1916 with Adda Gleason, and again in 1936 with Loretta Young.

== Plot ==
Ramona (1928)

Ramona, who is half Native American, is raised by a Mexican family. Ramona suffers racism and prejudice in her community, and when she finds out that she is half Native, she chooses to identify as a Native American instead of a Mexican American so that she can marry Alessandro, who is a Native as well. This romantic tragedy relays the tragic death of Ramona and Alessandro’s child at the hands of a white doctor, who refuses to help their child because of his skin color. Shortly after, the couple moves away, and Alessandro is killed by a white man for robbing him of his horse; Ramona eventually reunites with her childhood friend Felipe and starts a new life as a depressed woman. She is able to recover from her depression and remember her feelings for Felipe only when he sings a song from their childhood to restore her memory.

== Cast ==
- Dolores del Río as Ramona
- Warner Baxter as Alessandro
- Roland Drew as Felipe
- Vera Lewis as Señora Moreno
- Michael Visaroff as Juan Canito
- John T. Prince as Father Salvierderra
- Mathilde Comont as Marda
- Carlos Amor as Sheepherder
- Jess Cavin as Bandit Leader
- Rita Carewe as Baby
- Jean the Dog as Dog
- Shep Houghton as the Mexican Boy
- Nadine Riga as the Girl
- Saint-Granier as the French singer
- Dorothy Teters as the Indian

== Music ==
The film featured a theme song entitled "Ramona" with music by Mabel Wayne and lyrics by L. Wolfe Gilbert. The song proved to be one of the biggest song hits of the year not only in the United States but worldwide.

== Production ==
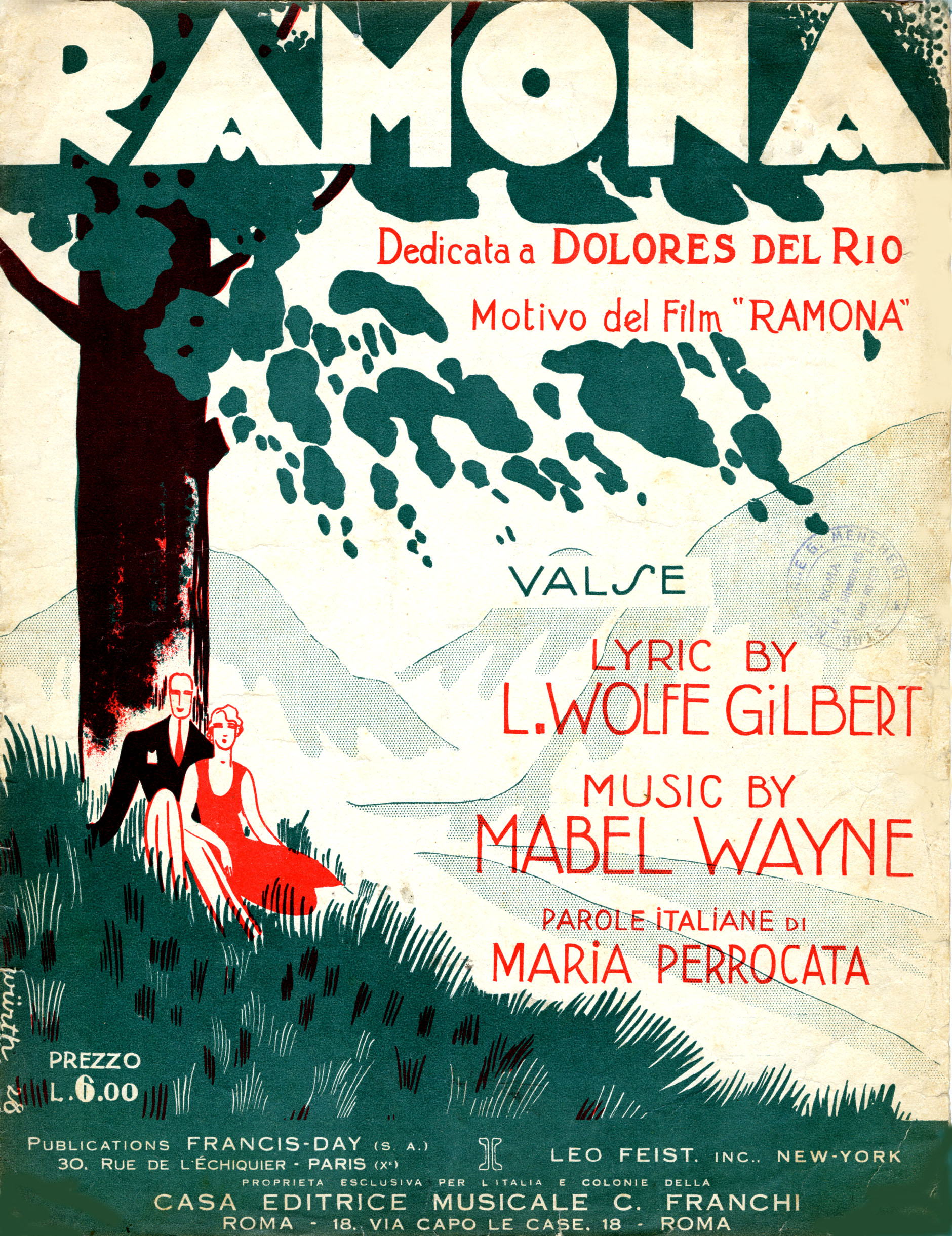
"Ramona" (1928), by L. Wolfe Gilbert and Mabel Wayne, was the first theme song ever written for the movies.

Parts of the film were shot in Zion National Park, Springdale, and Cedar Breaks National Monument, all in Utah.

== Reception ==
Mordaunt Hall of The New York Times found much to praise in what he called "an Indian love lyric": "This current offering is an extraordinarily beautiful production, intelligently directed and, with the exception of a few instances, splendidly acted. The scenic effects are charming. ... The different episodes are told discreetly and with a good measure of suspense and sympathy. Some of the characters have been changed to enhance the dramatic worth of the picture, but this is pardonable, especially when one considers this subject as a whole."

== Effects ==
An article published by UCLA claimed that the 1928 film is believed to be the most authentic of the five film adaptations of Ramona since the director Edwin Carewe was part Chickasaw and Dolores del Río was raised in Mexico. Ramona is differentiated from most films with a typical Hollywood ending because of its authentic cultural values embedded throughout. An article by Indian Country Today revealed the fact that Carewe discovered del Río in Mexico and invited her to Hollywood to perform in his film. Many film enthusiasts see Carewe as del Río’s steppingstone to fame in Hollywood as an actor and singer. Del Río recorded the film's theme song, "Ramona." It was not used in the 1936 version.

Helen Hunt Jackson and Edwin Carewe shared a goal of exposing the mistreatment of the Native Americans at the hands of the U.S. Federal Government through the means of Ramona. Both the book and the film, however, were popularized because of their dramatic, romantic, and cultural aspects.

== Preservation status ==
For decades, Ramona was thought to be lost until archivists rediscovered it in the Czech Film Archive in Prague in 2010. The Motion Picture, Broadcasting and Recorded Sound Division of the Library of Congress later transferred Ramona’s highly flammable original nitrate film to acetate safety stock. Library of Congress Moving Image Curator Rob Stone was in charge of the challenge of converting Ramona’s Czech intertitles back into English. The only available copy was given to the Library of Congress to replicate and then send back to the Czech Republic.

Today, prints of the film are held at Library of Congress and the Czech Film Archive and also at Gosfilmofond.

The restored version of the 1928 film had its world premiere in the Billy Wilder Theater with the Mont Alto Motion Picture Orchestra playing live at the University of California, Los Angeles on March 29, 2014. Later, on October 17, 2014, Rodney Sauer and the Mont Alto Motion Picture Orchestra and Film Historian Jeffrey Crouse brought the film "home" to Springdale, Utah, for a special performance to the place where the film was largely shot. Carewe's older brother Finis Fox had written Ramona's screenplay and created its intertitles.

== See also ==
- List of rediscovered films
- List of early sound feature films (1926–1929)
