= Finis Fox =

American screenwriter and director (1884-1949)

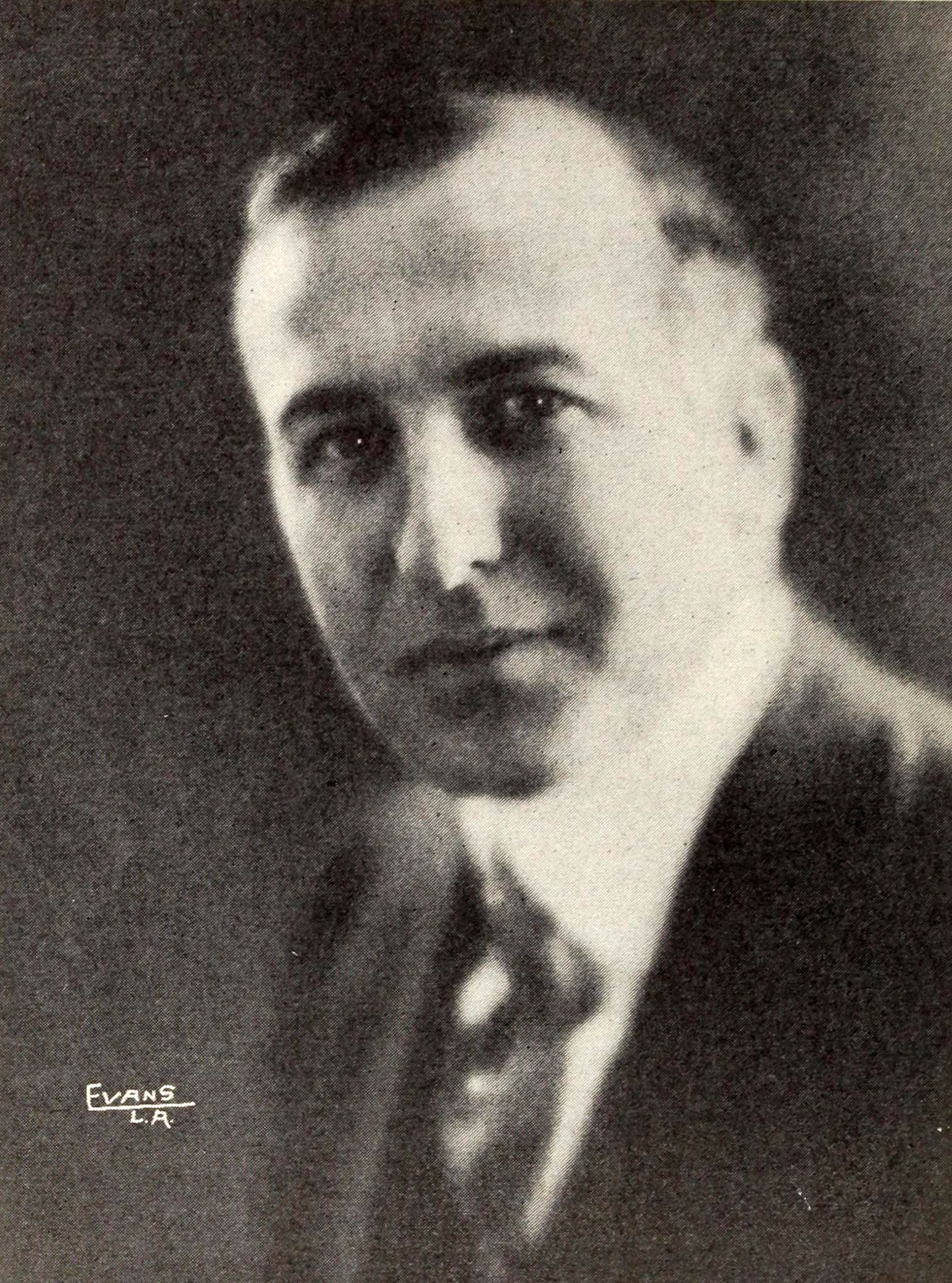
- Evans Studio, Los Angeles, 1921
- Born: 8 October 1884; Caddo, Oklahoma, United States
- Died: 7 November 1949 (aged 65); San Antonio, Texas, United States
- Occupations: Screenwriter; Director
- Years active: 1917-1934
- Spouse(s): Loris; Conchita
- Relatives: Edwin Carewe (older brother); Wallace Fox (younger brother); Rita Carewe (niece); LeRoy Mason (nephew-in-law)

Finis Fox (8 October 1884 - 7 November 1949) was an American screenwriter and director mainly active during the silent film era.

== Partial filmography ==
- The Jury of Fate (1917, writer)
- The Voice of Conscience (1917, writer)
- The Way of the Strong (1919, writer)
- Blackie's Redemption (1919, writer)
- Shadows of Suspicion (1919, writer)
- Please Get Married (1919, writer)
- False Evidence (1919, writer)
- Easy to Make Money (1919, writer)
- The Great Romance (1919, writer)
- The Parisian Tigress (1919, writer)
- The Web of Deceit (1920)
- Penny of Top Hill Trail (1921, writer)
- Scrap Iron (1921, writer)
- Man's Law and God's (1922, director)
- Merry-Go-Round (1923, writer)
- Bag and Baggage (1923, director)
- Tipped Off (1923, director)
- The Danger Girl (1926, writer)
- Winning the Futurity (1926, writer)
- Shipwrecked (1926, writer)
- The Flame of the Yukon (1926, writer)
- The Speeding Venus (1926, writer)
- Resurrection (1927, writer)

== Bibliography ==
- Munden, Kenneth White. The American Film Institute Catalog of Motion Pictures Produced in the United States, Part 1. University of California Press, 1997.
