= Rita Carewe =

American actress (1909–1955)

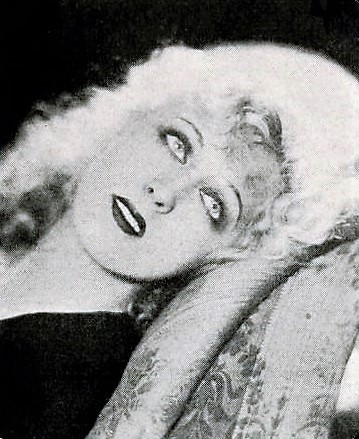
- Born: Violette Fox; September 9, 1909; New York City, U.S.
- Died: October 22, 1955 (aged 46); Torrance, California, U.S.
- Occupation: Actress
- Years active: 1925–1930
- Spouse: LeRoy Mason (m. 1928; div. 1935)
- Parent: Edwin Carewe

Rita Carewe (born Violette Fox, September 9, 1909 – October 22, 1955) was an American actress.

== Family ==
Violette Fox was born on September 9, 1909, to Edwin Carewe (born Jay Fox) and Mary Jane Croft. She had a sister, Mary Jane. Fox's father, Edwin, was a film director/producer for United Artists. In 1914, he came to Hollywood as a director for Lubin Studios. Later he worked for Rolf-Metro, Selig Polyscope Company, and First National Pictures. He was married three times, twice to the actress Mary Akin.

== Film career ==
Edwin signed Rita to a five-year contract with First National Pictures, in reward for her work in Joanna (1925), which he directed. Her first assignment under her new contract was in High Steppers (1926). The movie featured Dolores del Río, Mary Astor, and Lloyd Hughes.

Carewe was selected as one of 13 actresses selected as one of the WAMPAS Baby Stars in 1927. The 100 members of WAMPAS chose her, along with Natalie Kingston, Sally Phipps, Adamae Vaughn, Iris Stuart, and eight more as the actresses as most likely to succeed in the film world.

A committee of 25 important people in the industry promoted Carewe for the role of Lorelei Lee in Gentlemen Prefer Blondes (1928). The part was eventually won by Ruth Taylor. Carewe played the girl of the streets in Resurrection (1927). This was followed by a more important role, as Tina, in Revenge (1928). The film was based on a story written by gypsy author, Konrad Bercovici.

Her first motion picture in the sound medium was Prince Gabby (1929). She acted opposite Edward Everett Horton in a screen adaptation of an Edgar Wallace novel. Her final film appearance was in Radio Kisses (1930).

== Marriage ==
Carewe eloped to Yuma, Arizona, with actor LeRoy Mason in July 1928. Mason had been discovered by Carewe's father at a sandwich counter.

Carewe and Mason separated in December 1934, and she filed for divorce in November 1935.

Rita Carewe died at age 45 in Torrance, California. She is interred in Angelus-Rosedale Cemetery in Los Angeles.

== Filmography ==
- Joanna (1925)
- High Steppers (1926)
- Resurrection (1927)
- The Stronger Will (1928)
- Ramona (1928)
- Revenge (1928)
- Prince Gabby (1929)
- Radio Kisses (1930)
