= Edwin Carewe =

Chickasaw actor and director (1883–1940

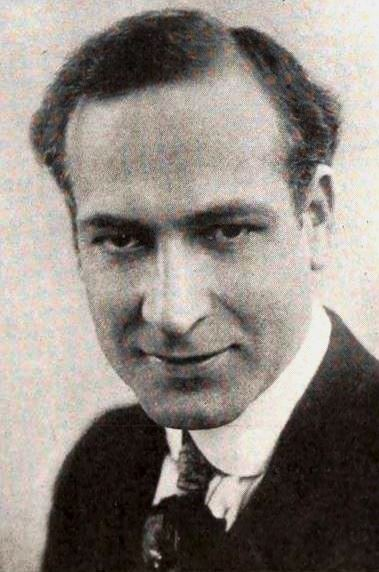
- Carewe in 1918
- Born: Jay John Fox; March 3, 1883; Gainesville, Texas, United States
- Died: January 22, 1940 (aged 56); Hollywood, California, United States
- Citizenship: Chickasaw Nation, American
- Education: University of Texas
- Occupations: Film director, actor
- Years active: 1912–1934
- Spouses: Mary Jane Croft; Mary Akin (actress); Mary Akin (remarried)
- Children: Violette Carewe, Mary Jane Carewe, Sally Ann Carewe, William Carewe, Carol Lee Carewe
- Parent(s): Franklin Marion Fox and Sally J. Priddy Fox
- Family: F. Finish Carewe (brother); Wallace Carewe (brother)

Edwin Carewe (March 3, 1883, in Chickasaw Nation – January 22, 1940) was a Native American motion picture director, actor, producer, and screenwriter.

== Early life and education ==
Jay John Fox was born on March 3, 1883, in Gainesville, Texas. His parents were Franklin Marion Fox and Sallie J. Priddy Fox.

Carewe and his two brothers, Wallace Ware Fox (a director/producer) and Franklin Finis Fox (a scenario writer), were all citizens of the Chickasaw Nation and original enrollees on the 1907 Chickasaw Dawes Rolls.

== Career ==
After brief studies at the Universities of Texas and Missouri and a period of work with regional theatrical groups, Carewe moved to New York City in 1910, where he became a member of the Dearborn Stock Company. Although Jay Fox was his given name, Carewe chose Edwin (from stage actor Edwin Booth) and Carewe from a character he was playing.

Carewe was on stage as an actor before he worked for Lubin studios. Later, he directed films for MGM, First National, Universal Studios, Paramount Pictures, and United Artists. During his career, he provided early screen exposure to many actors such as Dolores del Río, Warner Baxter, Francis X. Bushman and Gary Cooper. He directed 58 films including the acclaimed 1928 version of Ramona starring Dolores del Río and Warner Baxter, which was rediscovered and restored by the Library of Congress and had its world premiere at the University of California, Los Angeles in 2014.

Another of Carewe's notable films was Evangeline in 1929, also with Del Río, and written by his brother Finis Fox. Evangeline was based upon the poem by Henry Wadsworth Longfellow and earned praise for its exceptional lighting and camera work.

Although Carewe directed and produced several critically and financially successful pictures during the silent era, he was not fully able to make the transition to sound. After resorting to sound remakes of his earlier successes, and later to low-budget and religious films, he made his last feature Are We Civilized? in 1934.

Carewe was married three times, twice to actress Mary Akin. By his first wife, Mary Jane Croft (married January 9, 1909 in Toronto, Ontario), he had two daughters, Violette (who became an actress, known as "Rita Carewe") and Mary Jane. By his first marriage to his second wife, Mary Akin, he had two children, Sally Ann and William (born Edwin Gilbert). By his second marriage to Akin, they had one more child, Carol Lee.

== Death ==
Carewe died from a heart ailment in his Hollywood apartment, and is buried at Hollywood Forever Cemetery.

== Filmography ==
=== Director ===
Year	Films	Notes
1914	Across the Pacific	Extant at The Museum of Modern Art
1915	Cora	Lost film
1915	The Cowboy and the Lady	Lost film
1915	Destiny: Or, The Soul of a Woman	3 of 5 reels held at Library of Congress
1915	The Final Judgment	
1915	The House of Tears	Lost film
1915	Marse Covington	Lost film
1916	The Dawn of Love	Lost film
1916	God's Half Acre	Extant at Library of Congress
1916	Her Great Price	Lost film
1916	The Snowbird	
1916	The Sunbeam	Lost film
1916	The Upstart	Lost film
1917	The Barricade	Lost film
1917	The Greatest Power	Lost film
1917	Her Fighting Chance	Lost film
1917	The Trail of the Shadow	Lost film
1917	Their Compact	Lost film
1917	The Voice of Conscience	
1918	The House of Gold	Lost film
1918	Liberty Bond Jimmy	Short film
1918	Pals First	Lost film Remade in 1926
1918	The Splendid Sinner	Lost film
1918	The Trail to Yesterday	
1919	Easy to Make Money	Lost film
1919	False Evidence	
1919	The Right to Lie	Extant at EYE Filmmuseum
1919	Shadows of Suspicion	Lost film
1919	The Way of the Strong	Lost film
1920	Isobel; Or, The Trail's End	Lost film
1920	Rio Grande	Lost film
1920	The Web of Deceit	
1921	Habit	Lost film
1921	Her Mad Bargain	Lost film
1921	The Invisible Fear	Lost film
1921	My Lady's Latchkey	Lost film
1921	Playthings of Destiny	Lost film
1922	I Am the Law	Lost film
1922	A Question of Honor	Lost film
1922	Silver Wings	Lost film
1923	The Bad Man	Lost film
1923	The Girl of the Golden West	Lost film
1923	Mighty Lak' a Rose	Lost film
1924	Madonna of the Streets	Lost film
1924	A Son of the Sahara	Lost film
1925	Joanna	Lost film
1925	The Lady Who Lied	Lost film
1925	My Son	Lost film
1925	Why Women Love	Lost film
1926	High Steppers	Lost film
1926	Pals First	Lost film
1927	Resurrection	Lost film
1928	Ramona	
1928	Revenge	
1929	Evangeline	
1930	The Spoilers	
1931	Resurrection	
1934	Are We Civilized?	

=== Actor ===
- The Water Rats (1912)
- Gentleman Joe (1912)
- The Moonshiner's Daughter (1912)
- A Girl's Bravery (1912)
- The Call of the Heart (1913)
- His Conscience (1913)
- Into the Light (1913)
- On Her Wedding Day (1913)
- Her Husband's Picture (1913)
- From Ignorance to Light (1913)
- The Wine of Madness (1913)
- The Great Pearl (1913)
- Kidnapping Father (1913)
- Retribution (1913)
- A Mock Marriage (1913)
- In the Harem of Haschem (1913)
- A Florida Romance (1913)
- Women of the Desert (1913)
- The Moonshiner's Wife (1913)
- Dolores' Decision (1913)
- The Soul of a Rose (1913)
- The First Prize (1913)
- The Supreme Sacrifice (1913)
- The Regeneration of Nancy (1913)
- Down on the Rio Grande (1913)
- It Might Have Been (1913)
- Love's Justice (1913)
- The Mexican Spy (1913)
- The Miser (1913)
- On the Threshold (1913)
- Private Smith (1913)
- The Three of Us (1914)
- Cora (1915)
- Snowbird (1916)

=== Producer ===
- Isobel or The Trail's End (1920)
- The Web of Deceit (1920)
- I Am the Law (1922)
- The Bad Man (1923)
- The Girl of the Golden West (1923)
- Mighty Lak' a Rose (1923)
- Madonna of the Streets (1924)
- A Son of the Sahara (1924)
- Joanna (1925)
- Why Women Love (1925)
- The Lady Who Lied (1925)
- My Son (1925)
- Pals First (1926)
- High Steppers (1926)
- Resurrection (1927)
- Revenge (1928)
- Evangeline (1929)
- The Spoilers (1930)
- Resurrection (1931)
- Are We Civilized? (1934)

=== Writer ===
- Across the Pacific (1914)
- The Dancer and the King (1914)
- Rio Grande (1920)
- Resurrection (1927)
