= List of Rhea Mitchell performances =

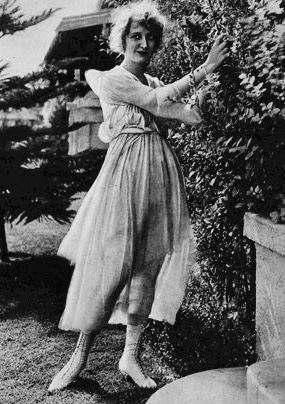
Mitchell in 1920

Rhea Mitchell was an American actress and writer who came to prominence during the silent film era, appearing in numerous pictures in the early-1910s. Her first major featured role was in Reginald Barker's Western On the Night Stage (1915), followed by a supporting part in Barker's The Devil, adapted by Thomas Ince (also 1915). The same year, she had a supporting role in the serial film The Diamond from the Sky, co-starring with Lottie Pickford.

After the advent of sound films, Mitchell continued to work sporadically, though most her performances were uncredited. In 1927, she wrote two feature films, including The Home Trail, directed by William Wyler. Some of her later acting credits include Green Dolphin Street (1947), State of the Union (1948), and Stars in My Crown (1950). She retired in 1952, after which she spent her remaining years managing apartment buildings in Los Angeles. She was murdered by a disgruntled tenant in 1957.

== Film ==
Key
†	Denotes a lost or presumed lost film

Year	Title	Role	Director(s)	Notes	Ref.
1912	The Colonel's Ward		Edward LeSaint		
1912	The Hidden Trail		Thomas H. Ince		
1912	His Squaw		Charles Giblyn		
1913	An Indian's Gratitude	Martha - Lt. Randall's Sweetheart	Frank Montgomery		
1913	An Indian's Honor		Jack Conway; Frank Montgomery		
1913	A Frontier Wife	Mrs. Coles	Francis Ford		
1914	The Heart of Maggie Malone	Grace	Edward LeSaint	Short film	
1914	A New England Idyl	Rose Powers	Walter Edwards	Credited as Miss Mitchell	
1914	Repaid Broncho	Nell Worth	Walter Edwards	Short film	
1914	North of 53	Celestine	Jay Hunt	Short film	
1914	A Barrier Royal	The Princess Marie	Raymond B. West	Short film	
1914	Wolves of the Underworld	Mary Maloney	Jay Hunt	Short film	
1914	Shorty Escapes a Marriage	Nell Holden	Richard Stanton		
1914	The Fires of Ambition	Mrs. Patton	Jay Hunt		
1914	Tennessee	Tennessee	Jay Hunt	Short film	
1914	In the Southern Hills	Nan Hopkins	George Osborne	Short film	
1914	The Feud at Beaver Creek	Almirey Cole	George Osborne	Short film	
1914	The Long Feud	Nancy	George Osborne	Short film	
1914	The Old Love's Best	Vera Morris	Scott Sidney	Short film; also known as First Love's Best	
1914	The Cruise of the Molly Ann	Nell Farrell	Walter Edwards	Short film	
1914	A Tragedy of the North Woods	Hilda	Walter Edwards	Short film	
1914	The Game Keeper's Daughter	Mary	George Osborne	Short film	
1914	The Master of the House	Lois Herrington	Richard Stanton	Short film	
1914	A Game of Life	Amy Clune		Short film	
1914	In the Sage Brush Country	Edith Wilding	William S. Hart	Short film	
1915	The Scourge of the Desert	Ellen Holt	William S. Hart	Alternative title: Reformed Outlaw	
1915	Mr. 'Silent' Haskins	Priscilla Miller	William S. Hart	Short film	
1915	The Fakir	Mlle. Florine	Walter Edwards	Short film	
1915	The Devil	Milli	Reginald Barker		
1915	Molly of the Mountains	Molly Simms	Charles Swickard	Short film	
1915	On the Night Stage	Belle Shields	Reginald Barker		
1915	The Valley of Hate	Madge Canfield	Tom Chatterton	Short film	
1915	The Diamond from the Sky †		Jacques Jaccard; William Desmond Taylor		
1915	The Kite	Marion Wheeler	Tom Chatterton		
1915	The Operator at Big Sandy	Nell Oakley	Tom Chatterton	Short film	
1915	Tools of Providence	Daisy Austin	William S. Hart		
1915	The Phantom Extra	Hazel Flemming	Richard Stanton	Short film	
1915	The Brink	Beth Kirkland	Charles Swickard		
1915	The Beckoning Flame	Elsa Arlington	Charles Swickard		
1915	Don Quixote	Lucinda	Edward Dillon		
1916	The Sable Curse	Mary	George L. Sargent	Alternative title: The Sable Blessing	
1916	Sequel to the Diamond from the Sky †	Esther Stanley	Edward Sloman		
1916	The Three Musketeers	Constance Bonacieux	Charles Swickard		
1916	A Camille of the Barbary Coast	Belle	Rae Berger	Alternative title: The Overcoat	
1916	The Blindness	Anna – the Schoolteacher	Carl M. Leviness		
1916	The Man from Manhattan	Virginia Winters	Jack Halloway		
1916	Philip Holden - Waster	Helen Landon	George L. Sargent		
1916	Overalls	Bettina Warren	Jack Halloway		
1917	The Gilded Youth	Mary	George L. Sargent		
1917	Whither Thou Goest	Maizie	Raymond B. West		
1918	The Blindness of Divorce	Florence Langdon	Frank Lloyd		
1918	Social Ambition	Rose	Wallace Worsley		
1918	Honor's Cross	Jane Cabot	Wallace Worsley		
1918	The Goat	Bijou Lamour	Donald Crisp		
1918	Boston Blackie's Little Pal	Mary	E. Mason Hopper		
1918	The Ghost of the Rancho	Mary Drew	William Worthington		
1918	Unexpected Places	Ruth Penfield	E. Mason Hopper		
1919	The Money Corral †	Janet Collins	William S. Hart		
1919	The Hawk's Trail †	Jean Drake	W. S. Van Dyke		
1919	The Sleeping Lion	Kate Billings	Rupert Julian		
1920	The Devil's Claim	Virginia Crosby	Charles Swickard		
1920	The Scoffer	Alice Porn	Allan Dwan		
1921	A Ridin' Romeo	Mabel Brentwood	George Marshall		
1921	Good Women	Natalie Shelby	Louis J. Gasnier		
1921	The Innocent Cheat	Peggy Adair	Ben F. Wilson		
1923	The Greatest Menace	Mary Lewis	Albert S. Rogell		
1924	The Other Kind of Love	The Chorus Girl	Duke Worne		
1926	Modern Youth		Jack Nelson		
1927	The Home Trail		William Wyler	Also writer	
1927	The Dude Desperado	—	George Hunter	Writer	
1928	Danger Patrol	Gladys Lawlor	Duke Worne		
1933	The Big Bluff		Reginald Denny		
1934	Behold My Wife!	Reporter	Mitchell Leisen	Uncredited	
1934	Whom the Gods Destroy	Survivor	Walter Lang	Uncredited	
1934	One Hour Late	Stage mother	Ralph Murphy	Uncredited	
1936	15 Maiden Lane	Elevator operator	Allan Dwan	Uncredited	
1936	Song and Dance Man	Sister Team	Allan Dwan	Uncredited	
1936	San Francisco	Earthquake survivor	W. S. Van Dyke	Uncredited	
1936	Mysterious Crossing	Hall clerk	Arthur Lubin	Uncredited	
1936	The Texas Rangers	Stage passenger	King Vidor	Uncredited	
1938	The Ship That Died	Passenger on Mary Celeste	Jacques Tourneur		
1940	I Take This Woman	Decker's Secretary	W. S. Van Dyke	Uncredited	
1943	Harrigan's Kid	Woman at Race Track	Charles Reisner	Uncredited	
1943	The Cross of Lorraine	Mother	Tay Garnett	Uncredited	
1944	Marriage Is a Private Affair	Nurse	Robert Z. Leonard	Uncredited	
1944	Mrs. Parkington	Mrs. Humphrey	Tay Garnett	Uncredited	
1945	The Hidden Eye	Pedestrian	Richard Whorf	Uncredited	
1946	The Hoodlum Saint	Reporter	Norman Taurog	Uncredited	
1947	The Romance of Rosy Ridge	Wife	Ray Rowland	Uncredited	
1947	The Unfinished Dance	Seamstress	Henry Koster	Uncredited	
1947	Green Dolphin Street	Emily	Victor Saville	Uncredited	
1947	The Mighty McGurk	Woman at Children's Society	John Waters	Uncredited	
1948	B.F.'s Daughter	Assistant secretary	Robert Z. Leonard	Uncredited	
1948	The Bride Goes Wild	Wedding guest	Norman Taurog	Uncredited	
1948	State of the Union	Jeny	Frank Capra	Alternative title: The World and His Wife	
1948	High Wall	Minor role	Curtis Bernhardt	Uncredited	
1949	In the Good Old Summertime	Woman at window	Robert Z. Leonard	Uncredited	
1950	The Skipper Surprised His Wife	Clubwoman	Elliot Nugent	Uncredited	
1950	Stars In My Crown	Mrs. Backett	Jacques Tourneur	Uncredited	
1950	Please Believe Me		Norman Taurog	Uncredited	
1950	Annie Get Your Gun		George Sidney	Uncredited	
1950	The Next Voice You Hear...	Woman in church	William A. Wellman	Uncredited	
1950	Bannerline	Stambaugh maid	Don Weis	Uncredited	
1950	Dial 1119		Gerald Mayer	Uncredited	
1951	Grounds for Marriage	Nurse	Robert Z. Leonard	Uncredited	
1951	Texas Carnival	Dealer	Charles Walters	Uncredited	
1951	The Unknown Man	Maid	Richard Thorpe	Uncredited	
1951	It's a Big Country	School teacher	Various	Uncredited	
1952	Washington Story		Robert Pirosh	Uncredited	
1952	My Man and I	Nurse	William A. Wellman	Uncredited	
1952	The Member of the Wedding	Townswoman	Fred Zinnemann	Uncredited	

== Sources ==
- Katchmer, George A. (2015). A Biographical Dictionary of Silent Film Western Actors and Actresses. Jefferson, North Carolina: McFarland. ISBN 978-1-476-60905-8.
- Miller, Gabriel (2013). William Wyler: The Life and Films of Hollywood's Most Celebrated Director. Lexington, Kentucky: University Press of Kentucky. ISBN 978-0-813-14210-4.
- Rainey, Buck (1990). Those Fabulous Serial Heroines: Their Lives and Films. Lanham, Maryland: Scarecrow Press. ISBN 978-0-810-81911-5.
- Rainey, Buck (1992). Sweethearts of the Sage: Biographies and Filmographies of 258 Actresses Appearing in Western Movies. Jefferson, North Carolina: McFarland. ISBN 978-0-899-50565-7.
