= Blackie's Redemption =

1919 American silent drama film, directed by John Ince

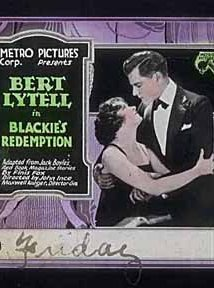
- Glass slide
- Directed by: John Ince
- Written by: Finis Fox
- Based on: the novel, Boston Blackie by Jack Boyle
- Produced by: Maxwell Karger
- Starring: Bert Lytell; Alice Lake; Henry Kolker
- Cinematography: Robert B. Kurrle
- Production company: Metro Pictures
- Release date: April 14, 1919 (US)
- Running time: 5 reels
- Country: United States
- Language: Silent (English intertitles)

Blackie's Redemption, also known by its working title Powers That Pray, is a lost 1919 American silent drama film directed by John Ince. It stars Bert Lytell, Alice Lake, and Henry Kolker, and was released on April 14, 1919.

== Plot ==
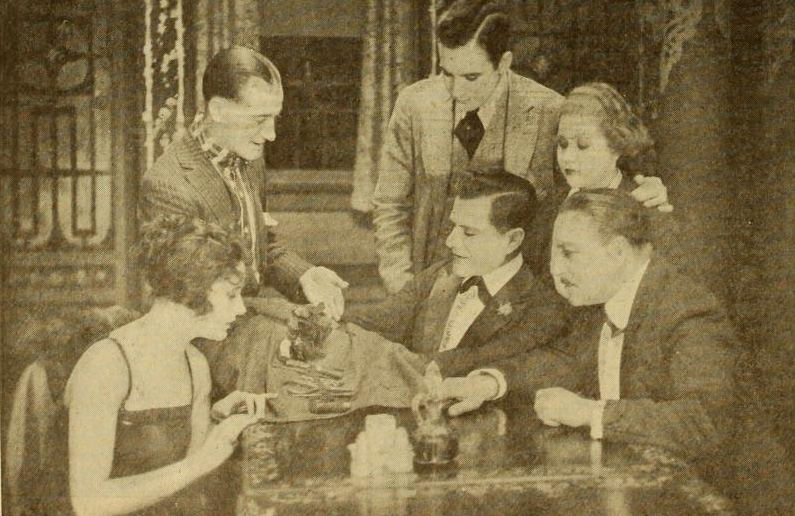
Blackie and his associates at his farewell dinner

Boston Blackie is a notorious thief who has a reputation of such ability that he can never get caught. However, he has vowed to give up his life of crime so that he can marry Mary Dawson. The night before his wedding he plans a dinner with his soon to be former associates. One of those associates, Fred the Count, has just robbed a safe. When the police arrive, Fred places a piece of jewelry from the safe into Blackie's pocket to throw suspicion away from himself. The plan works and Blackie is arrested and sent to prison.

During Blackie's first year behind bars, Fred makes a play for Mary, but she rebuffs him. Meanwhile, Blackie develops a plan for breaking out of prison. Realizing that escape will be easier to accomplish from the prison's infirmary, he makes himself through a combination of imbibing small amounts of lye, and reducing his food intake to only bread crusts. He is successful and is sent to the infirmary. While he is there he manages to escape during a violent storm, and makes his way to a hideout near a lumber camp. Unfortunately, the prison warden tracks Blackie to the cabin, but Blackie gets the drop on him. However, Blackie cannot bring himself to harm a defenseless man, so lets the warden go. As a result, the warden realizes that Blackie is a changed man, and allows Blackie to go through with his escape.

Blackie has one last task to accomplish, getting back at Fred the Count. He learns of Fred's plans to rob the safe of the nearby lumber company. He alerts the authorities, and Fred is arrested and sent to prison. Blackie and Mary marry, and sail off to Hawaii.

== Cast ==
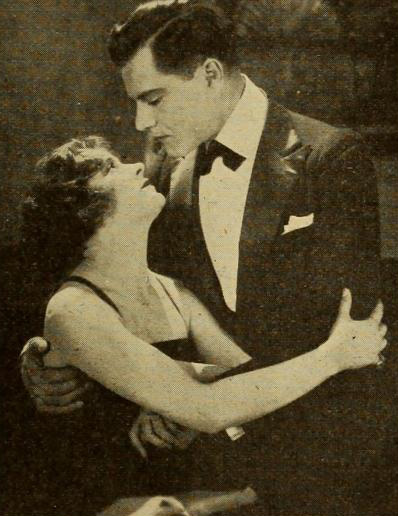
Lytell and Lake before he is sent to prison

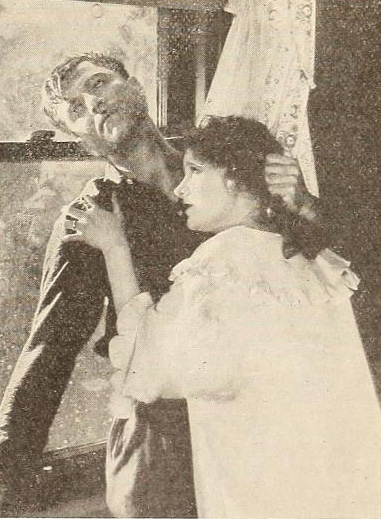
Lytell and Lake in the cabin near the lumber camp

- Bert Lytell as Boston Blackie
- Alice Lake as Mary Dawson
- Henry Kolker as Fred the Count
- Bernard Durning as Sober Dent
- Jack Duffy as The dove
- William Musgrave as Little Squirrel
- Gertrude Short as Baby Doll
- Don Bailey as Chief of Detectives
- Wilton Taylor as Detective Mack
- Ah Toy as Chinese Waiter
- Joseph Kilgour as The Warden

== Production ==
Blackie's Redemption is based on two Boston Blackie stories by Jack Boyle, "Boston Blackie's Mary" and "Fred, the Count". In March, Bert Lytell was tagged to star in the as yet unnamed film. He had originated the screen role of Boston Blackie earlier in 1919 in the film Boston Blackie's Little Pal. The working title of the play was Powers That Pray. Many of the interior scenes were shot at San Quentin. By early April the film nearing completion. The film was released on April 14, 1919.

== Reception ==
Exhibitors Herald gave the film a positive review, especially extolling the performances of Lytell, Kolker, Kilgour, and Currier. They also gave a positive nod to the remainder of the supporting cast. They also complimented Ince's direction, and Metro's production style. Moving Picture World gave the film a positive review, calling it a "specially worthy picture by reason of the excellent acting with which its story, and especially its characters, are made real and understandable." They made particular mention of the excellent acting of Lytell, Kilgour and Adams; as well as complimenting the direction and cinematography. Variety also gave the film a positive review, calling it "a corking crook story that holds the interest from the very first". They extolled Ince's direction, particularly during the storm scene, as well as highlighting the performances of Lytell, Kolker, Kilgour, and Lake.
