= The Beckoning Flame =

- Directed by: Charles Swickard
- Written by: C. Gardner Sullivan
- Starring: Henry Woodruff; Tsuru Aoki; Rhea Mitchell
- Cinematography: James A. Crosby
- Music by: Victor Schertzinger
- Production companies: Kay-Bee Pictures; New York Motion Picture
- Distributed by: Triangle Distributing
- Release dates: December 15, 1915 (New York City); January 16, 1916 (U.S.)
- Running time: 5 reels
- Country: United States
- Language: Silent (English intertitles)

The Beckoning Flame is a 1915 American silent drama film directed by Charles Swickard and featuring Henry Woodruff, Tsuru Aoki, and Rhea Mitchell in pivotal roles.

== Cast ==
- Henry Woodruff as Harry Dickson
- Tsuru Aoki as Janira
- Rhea Mitchell as Elsa Arlington
- J. Frank Burke as Ram Dass
- Louis Morrison as Prince Chandra
- J. Barney Sherry as Muhmed
- Roy Laidlaw as Hawes
- Joseph J. Dowling as Baron (credited as Joseph Dowling)
