= Man's Size =

1923 film

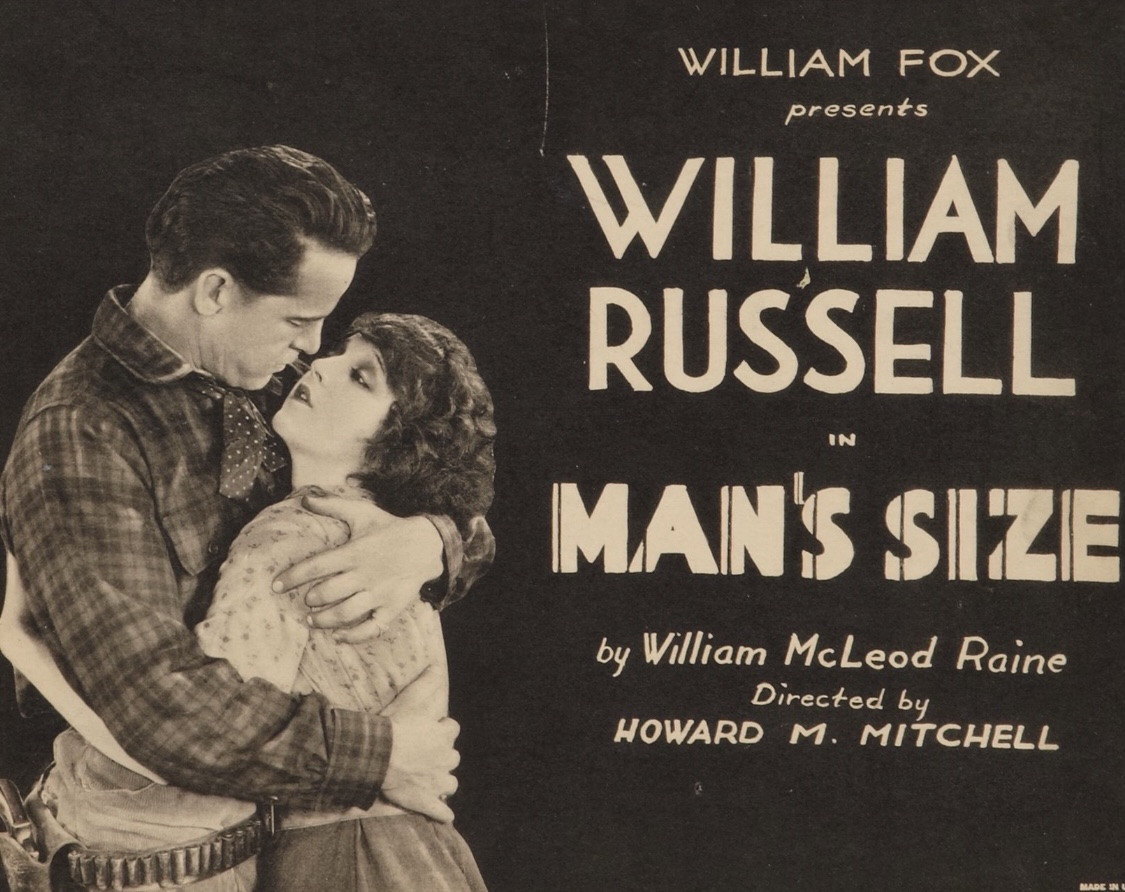
- Directed by: Howard M. Mitchell
- Written by: Joseph F. Poland
- Based on: Man Size by William MacLeod Raine
- Produced by: William Fox
- Starring: William Russell; Alma Bennett; Stanton Heck
- Cinematography: Ernest Miller; George Schneiderman
- Production company: William Russell Productions
- Distributed by: Fox Film Corporation
- Release date: January 21, 1923
- Running time: 50 minutes
- Country: United States
- Languages: Silent; English intertitles

Man's Size is a 1923 American silent drama film directed by Howard M. Mitchell and starring William Russell, Alma Bennett, and Stanton Heck. It is based upon the novel Man Size by William MacLeod Raine.

== Plot ==
As described in a film magazine, Tom Morse, while in the Northwest on business for his uncle, meets Jessie McRae, a young woman of the wilderness, who destroys the barrels of whiskey that were being smuggled to the Indians. He at first mistakes her for a boy, owing to the clothing she was wearing, and carries her to her father to be punished and only then discovers his error. She tells him that her adopted father says her parents her murdered by some drunken Indians and that she therefore seeks to prevent any other catastrophe of the kind. Angus McRae learns that Tom is the nephew of Carl Morse and forbids him from seeing Jessie again. Then Tom is put in charge of the trading post and, after he receives a commission from the government to assist in stamping out the traffic in liquor, he wins her friendship. Angus sells her to Bully West to get rid of her. Tom's uncle Carl comes to visit him and meets Angus. They learn that Jessie has been sold and Tom rushes to her rescue while Carl tells Angus that he sold his own child. Jessie is saved from the villain and she and Tom receive the blessings of the two old men.

== Cast ==
- William Russell as Tom Morse
- Alma Bennett as Jessie McRae
- Stanton Heck as Bully West
- Charles K. French as Angus McRae
- James Gordon as Carl Morse
- Carl Stockdale as Whaley

== Bibliography ==
- Solomon, Aubrey. The Fox Film Corporation, 1915-1935: A History and Filmography. McFarland, 2011.
