= One-Thing-at-a-Time O'Day =

1919 silent film directed by John Ince

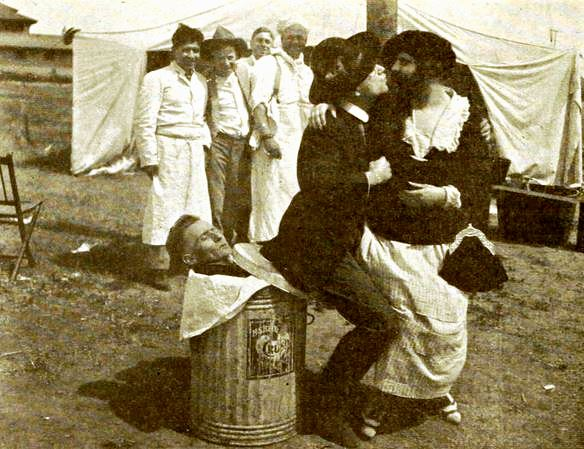
- Directed by: John Ince
- Written by: George D. Baker
- Based on: the short story, "One-Thing-at-a-Time O'Day" by William Dudley Pelley
- Produced by: Maxwell Karger
- Starring: Bert Lytell; Joseph Kilgour; Eileen Percy
- Cinematography: Robert Kurrle; Eugene Gaudio
- Production company: Metro Pictures
- Release date: June 23, 1919 (US)
- Running time: 5 reels
- Country: United States
- Language: English

One-Thing-at-a-Time O'Day is a lost 1919 American silent comedy film, directed by John Ince. It stars Bert Lytell, Joseph Kilgour, and Eileen Percy, and was released on June 23, 1919.

== Cast ==
- Bert Lytell as Stradivarius O'Day
- Joseph Kilgour as Charley Carstock
- Eileen Percy as Prairie-Flower Marie
- Stanton Heck as Gorilla Lawson
- William A. Carroll as MacLeod
- Jules Hanft as Billings
- John Hack as Roughneck M'Dool
- Bull Montana
