= One Year to Live =

1925 film

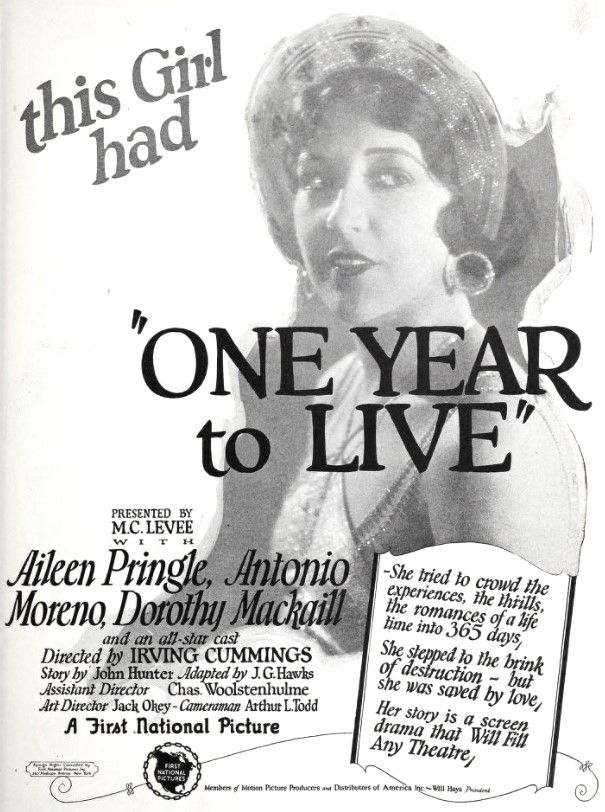
- Advertisement
- Directed by: Irving Cummings
- Screenplay by: J.G. Hawks; Robert E. Hopkins
- Starring: Aileen Pringle; Dorothy Mackaill; Sam De Grasse; Rosemary Theby; Leo White; Joseph Kilgour
- Cinematography: Arthur L. Todd
- Edited by: Charles J. Hunt
- Production company: First National Pictures
- Distributed by: First National Pictures
- Release date: March 15, 1925
- Running time: 70 minutes
- Country: United States
- Languages: Silent; English intertitles

One Year to Live is a 1925 American silent drama film directed by Irving Cummings and written by J.G. Hawks and Robert E. Hopkins. The film stars Aileen Pringle, Dorothy Mackaill, Sam De Grasse, Rosemary Theby, Leo White and Joseph Kilgour. The film was released on March 15, 1925, by First National Pictures.

== Plot ==
As described in a film magazine review, in Paris, Elise is maid to the great dancer, Lolette. Tom Kendrick comes to bid Lolette farewell, and is intrigued when he watches Elise's dancing when she believes herself alone. He falls in love with her, and deserts Lolette for her at the ball given in his theatre by Brunel, getting Elise in bad with Lolette. He declares his love, promises to write every day of his trip back to the United States and his return, after he is discharged from the army. Dr. Lapierre, who attends Elise's bed-ridden sister, Marthe, loves Elise, bribes the janitor to destroy Kendrick's letters and tells Elise she has but a year to live. Seemingly neglected by Kendrick, and with no money to leave to care for Marthe, Elise promises to become Brunel's mistress when he has made a great star out of her. Kendrick returns on the night Brunel claims his reward. Lapierre confesses his deception, Marthe recovers, and Elise refuses to fulfill her bargain. She convinces Kendrick of her innocence and they are reconciled.

== Cast ==
- Aileen Pringle as Elsie Duchanier
- Dorothy Mackaill as Marthe
- Sam De Grasse as Dr. Lucien La Pierre
- Rosemary Theby as Lolette
- Leo White as Stage Manager
- Joseph Kilgour as Maurice Brunel
- Antonio Moreno as Captain Tom Kendrick
- Rose Dione as Nanette
- Chester Conklin as Froquin

== Preservation ==
With no prints of One Year to Live located in any film archives, it is considered a lost film.
