= Hitting the High Spots =

1918 silent film directed by Charles Swickard

- Directed by: Charles Swickard
- Screenplay by: Bert Lytell; George D. Baker (scenario)
- Story by: Bert Lytell
- Produced by: George D. Baker
- Starring: Bert Lytell; Eileen Percy; Winter Hall
- Cinematography: Robert Kurrle
- Production company: Metro Pictures
- Release date: December 9, 1918 (US)
- Running time: 5 reels
- Country: United States
- Language: English

Hitting the High Spots is a 1918 American silent comedy-drama film, directed by Charles Swickard. It stars Bert Lytell, Eileen Percy, and Winter Hall, and was released on December 9, 1918. It is not known whether the film currently survives.

== Cast list ==
- Bert Lytell as Bob Durland
- Eileen Percy as Alice Randolph
- Winter Hall as Morgan Randolph
- Helen Dunbar as Mrs. Randolph
- Gordon Griffith as Jack Randolph
- Fred Goodwins as Harold Blake
- Ilean Hume as Tonia
- Stanton Heck as Von Holke
- Al Edmundson as Lopez
- William Eagle Eye as Jose
- William Courtright as Felipe
