= Proxies (film) =

1921 film

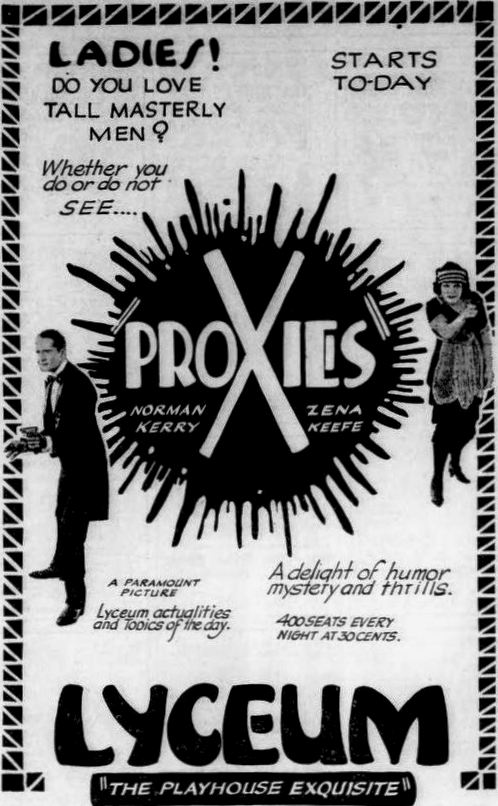
- Newspaper ad
- Directed by: George D. Baker
- Written by: Frank R. Adams (story); George D. Baker
- Produced by: Cosmopolitan Productions
- Starring: Norman Kerry
- Cinematography: Harold Wenstrom
- Edited by: Charles J. Hunt
- Distributed by: Paramount Pictures
- Release date: May 1, 1921
- Running time: 7 reels
- Country: United States
- Language: Silent (English intertitles)

Proxies is a 1921 American silent drama film feature produced by Cosmopolitan Productions and distributed by Paramount Pictures. It was directed by George D. Baker and starred Norman Kerry.

== Plot ==
As described in a film publication summary, Carlotta Darley is engaged to Homer Carleton, but regrets that Homer is not as tall and handsome as the butler Peter. Her father Christopher Darley was aware that Peter was a former crook but believes that he has reformed. Clare Conway, the household maid, is in love with Peter and jealous of Carlotta's admiration of him. A reception is in progress when John Stover arrives with a paper that will bring about the Darleys' financial ruin. Peter arranges to have John brought into the reception room, then holds up the guests to secure the paper and save his employer. Peter and Clare then escape together.

== Cast ==
- Norman Kerry as Peter Mendoza
- Zena Keefe as Clare Conway
- Raye Dean as Carlotta Darley
- Jack Crosby as Homer Carleton
- Paul Everton as John Stover
- William H. Tooker as Christopher Darley
- Mrs. Schaffer as Mrs. Darley
- Robert Broderick as Detective Linton

== Preservation status ==
A copy of Proxies is preserved at the Library of Congress.
