= Joseph Kilgour =

Canadian actor

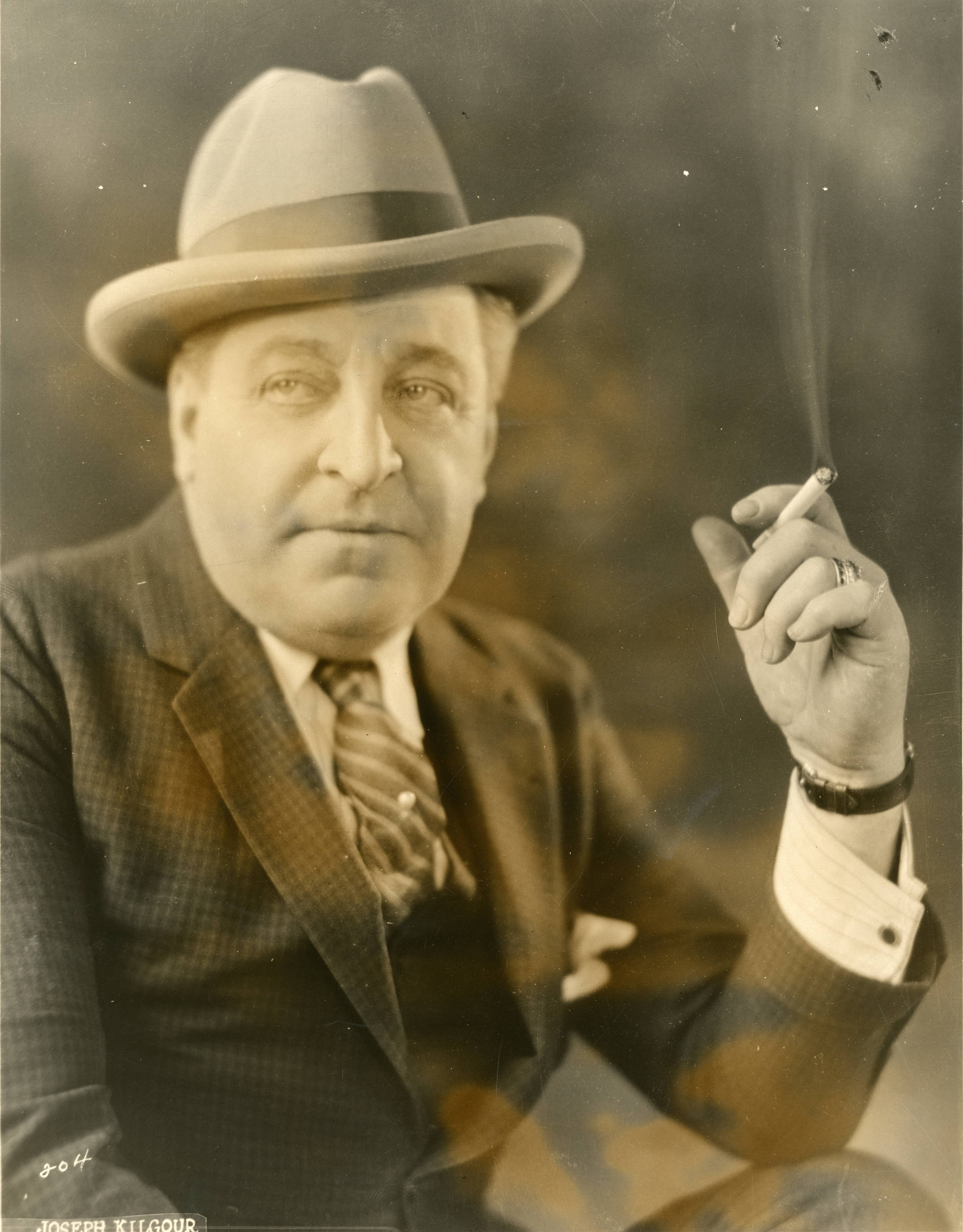
- Kilgour in 1924
- Born: 11 July 1863; Ayr, Ontario, Canada
- Died: 21 April 1933 (aged 69); Long Island, New York
- Resting place: Kensico Cemetery, Valhalla, Westchester County, New York
- Occupations: Silent film actor, stage actor
- Years active: 1909–1926

Joseph Kilgour (11 July 1863 – 21 April 1933) was a Canadian actor of the silent film era. He was a well-known veteran stage actor in Broadway theatre before entering silent films. He appeared in more than 50 films between 1909 and 1926.

Kilgour was born in Ayr, Canada West, to Joseph Kilgour Sr. and Mary Anderson, who married 29 September 1856. Kilgour was one of seven children of the general store owner. Kilgour left Ayr and moved to the United States to pursue his acting career. Kilgour retired from acting and died in Long Island, New York, in 1933.

== Partial filmography ==
- The Battle Cry of Peace (1915)
- My Lady's Slipper (1916)
- The Easiest Way (1917)
- Her Excellency, the Governor (1917)
- Runaway Romany (1917)
- Womanhood, the Glory of the Nation (1917)
- The Heart of Romance (1918)
- Social Hypocrites (1918)
- The Shell Game (1918)
- The House of Gold (1918)
- The Silent Woman (1918)
- The Divorcee (1919)
- A Favor To A Friend (1919)
- The Lion's Den (1919)
- Lombardi, Ltd. (1919)
- Blind Man's Eyes (1919)
- The Great Victory (1919)
- Blackie's Redemption (1919)
- One-Thing-at-a-Time O'Day (1919)
- The Walk-Offs (1920)
- Hearts Are Trumps (1920)
- The Heart of a Child (1920)
- Shore Acres (1920)
- Love (1920)
- The Yellow Typhoon (1920)
- The Broken Gate (1920)
- Mother o' Mine (1921)
- At the End of the World (1921)
- I Am Guilty (1921)
- Lying Lips (1921)
- Within the Law (1923)
- The Woman With Four Faces (1923)
- The Midnight Alarm (1923)
- Ponjola (1923)
- Torment (1924)
- On Probation (1924)
- Try and Get It (1924)
- Janice Meredith (1924)
- The Torrent (1924)
- Capital Punishment (1925)
- The Top of the World (1925)
- Percy (1925)
- One Year to Live (1925)
- The King on Main Street (1925)
- Let's Get Married (1926)
