= The Spender (1919 film) =

1919 silent film directed by Charles Swickard

- Directed by: Charles Swickard
- Screenplay by: Albert G. Kenyon; George D. Baker
- Based on: the short story, "The Spender" by Frederick Orin Bartlett
- Produced by: George D. Baker
- Starring: Bert Lytell; Thomas Jefferson; William V. Mong
- Cinematography: Robert Kurrle
- Production company: Metro Pictures
- Release date: January 6, 1919 (US)
- Running time: 5 reels
- Country: United States
- Language: English

Still from the film

The Spender is a 1919 American silent comedy film, directed by Charles Swickard. It stars Bert Lytell, Thomas Jefferson, and William V. Mong, and was released on January 6, 1919. The film is an adaptation of the short story of the same name, by Frederick Orin Bartlett. No prints of the film are known to survive.

== Cast list ==
- Bert Lytell as Dick Bisbee
- Thomas Jefferson as T. W. Bisbee
- William V. Mong as Stetson
- Mary Anderson as Helen Stetson
- Clarence Burton as Elmer Robbins
- Rosemary Theby as Adventuress
