= Between Two Women (1937 film) =

1937 film by George B. Seitz

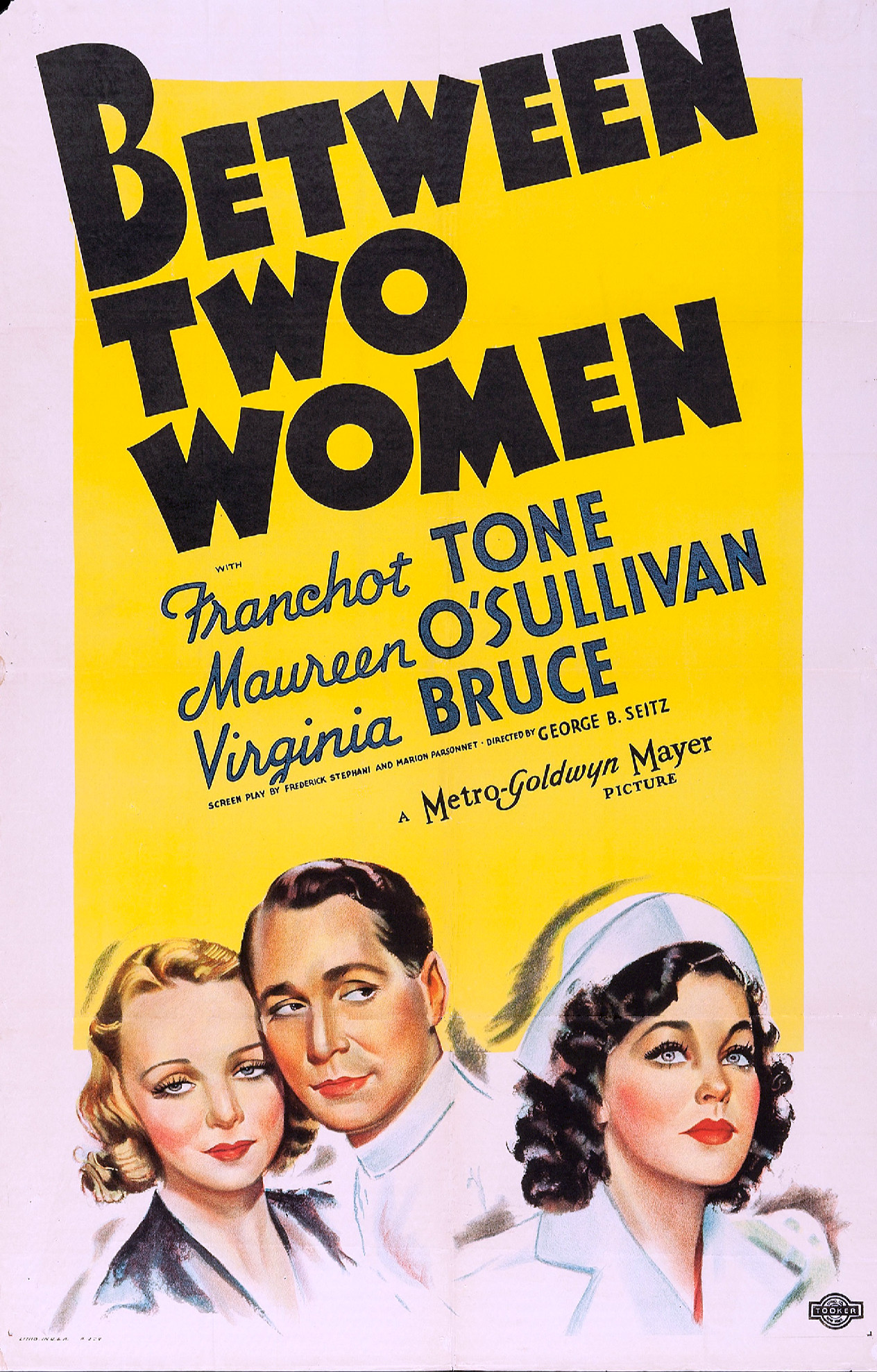
- Theatrical release poster
- Directed by: George B. Seitz
- Screenplay by: Frederick Stephani; Marion Parsonnet
- Story by: Erich von Stroheim
- Starring: Franchot Tone; Maureen O'Sullivan; Virginia Bruce; Leonard Penn; Cliff Edwards
- Cinematography: John F. Seitz
- Edited by: W. Donn Hayes
- Music by: William Axt
- Production company: Metro-Goldwyn-Mayer
- Distributed by: Metro-Goldwyn-Mayer
- Release date: July 9, 1937
- Running time: 88 minutes
- Country: United States
- Language: English

Between Two Women is a 1937 American drama film directed by George B. Seitz and written by Frederick Stephani and Marion Parsonnet. The film stars Franchot Tone, Maureen O'Sullivan, Virginia Bruce, Leonard Penn and Cliff Edwards. The film was released on July 9, 1937, by Metro-Goldwyn-Mayer.

== Plot ==
A love triangle forms between a doctor, a nurse, and an heiress.

== Cast ==
- Franchot Tone as Allan Meighan
- Maureen O'Sullivan as Claire Donahue
- Virginia Bruce as Patricia Sloan
- Leonard Penn as Tony Woolcott
- Cliff Edwards as Snoopy
- Janet Beecher as Miss Pringle
- Charley Grapewin as Dr. Webster
- Helen Troy as Sally
- Grace Ford as Nurse Howley
- June Clayworth as Eleanor
- Edward Norris as Dr. Barili
- Anthony Nace as Tom Donahue
- Hugh Marlowe as Priest
- Keye Luke as Dr. Lee
