= Faith (1919 film) =

1919 silent film directed by Charles Swickard

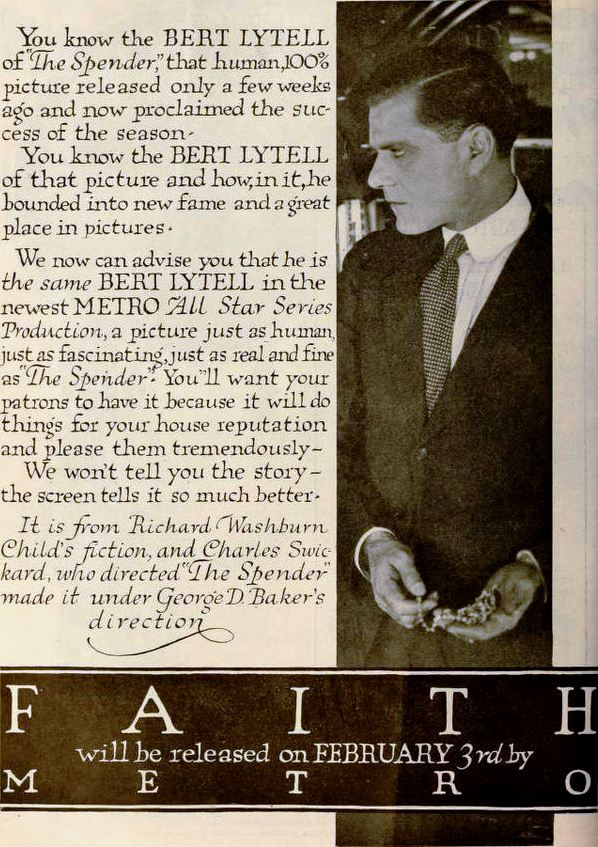
- Advertisement
- Directed by: Charles Swickard
- Screenplay by: George D. Baker (scenario); A. G. Kenyon (scenario)
- Story by: Richard Washburn Child
- Produced by: George D. Baker
- Starring: Bert Lytell; Rosemary Theby; Edythe Chapman
- Cinematography: Robert B. Kurrle
- Production company: Metro Pictures
- Release date: February 3, 1919 (US)
- Running time: 5 reels
- Country: United States
- Language: Silent (English intertitles)

Faith is a lost 1919 American silent drama film, directed by Charles Swickard. It stars Bert Lytell, Rosemary Theby, and Edythe Chapman, and was released on February 3, 1919.

== Plot ==
George Farrelly is a clerk in a bank, overseeing the bank's safety deposit boxes. One day he is visited by his childhood sweetheart, Charity Garvice, who he is still in love with. She lives with Martha Owen, their old teacher who is now blind, and lives with Charity so Charity can take care of her. Martha has had a premonition that something bad is about to happen to George, and has sent Charity to warn him. Charity convinces him to return to the cottage where she lives, and tell her something which will relieve her distress.

George goes back to the cottage and tells them a story about a diamond necklace that the bank president's wife had carelessly left in one of the bank's viewing booths in the safety box area. He had intended to return it, but before he could, he was enticed by a co-worker to go to a cabaret that evening. While there, he got so intoxicated he did not return the necklace, and when he returned to the bank the following day, he felt it was too late to return it without being accused of theft. Martha tells him that the best course of action is to go to the bank president, Abner Harrington, and return the necklace, explaining the delay. Charity thinks this is simply a story but when she follows him out of the cottage, he shows her the necklace. She tells him she loves him and if he is sent to jail, she'll be waiting for him.

He goes to Harrington's office and lays the necklace on his desk, telling him it was left behind in the safety deposit box area. Harrington informs him that he will need to be arrested. George asks for an hour to say goodbye to Charity, promising to return. Harrington agrees. George leaves, picks up Charity and the two marry. They go to the cottage and pick up Martha, before they return to Harrington's office. Upon their return, Harrington asks if George has ever heard of Diogenes. He explains that Diogenes used to walk around with a lantern, saying that he was searching for an honest man. Harrington declares that he has found one in George, and asks him to be his assistant at an annual salary of $10,000. He then invites them all to dinner. At the dinner, Mrs. Harrington reveals that the jewels were left on purpose, as a test of George's honesty.

== Cast list ==
- Bert Lytell as George Farrelly
- Rosemary Theby as Charity Garvice
- Edythe Chapman as Martha Owen
- Edwin Stevens as Abner Harrington
- Nancy Chase as Mrs. Harrington

== Reception ==
Reviews were mixed about the picture. Photoplay gave it a lukewarm review, enjoying Lytell's performance, but feeling the story was a bit unbelievable. Variety did not enjoy the film, saying, "A very nice one-reeler—possibly a scant two reels—would suffice to tell the story of 'Faith' and make of it a desirable picture for Sunday school children to illustrate a lecture on the subject of virtue being its own reward." Picture-Play Magazine, on the other hand, thoroughly enjoyed the film: "We don't often get such delightfully real, even, and penetrating pictures as Faith nowadays. Stories of the caliber of this one by Richard Washburn Child are not often written. But when we do get them we are ingrates indeed if we do not rise up and say 'thanks' audibly so that Metro and Bert and Mr. Child can hear. Mr. Lytell, by the way, is an actor who has that happy art of disguising the fact that he is an actor. Higher praise than this there is not."
