= Peggy Does Her Darndest =

1919 film directed by George D. Baker

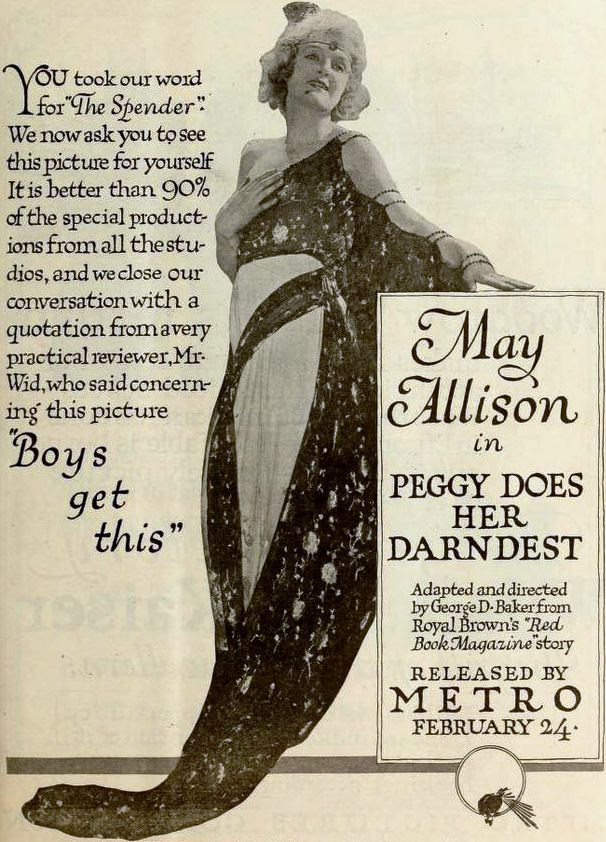
- Directed by: George D. Baker
- Written by: George D. Baker
- Based on: short story by Royal Brown
- Produced by: Maxwell Karger
- Starring: May Allison
- Cinematography: William Fildew
- Distributed by: Metro Pictures
- Release date: February 24, 1919
- Running time: 5 reels
- Country: USA
- Language: Silent...English intertitles

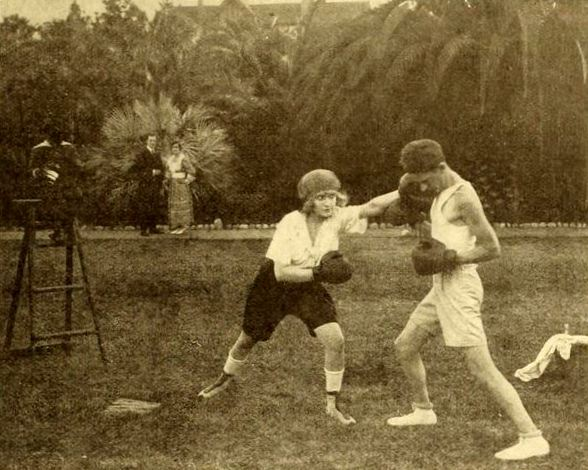
A scene with May Allison.

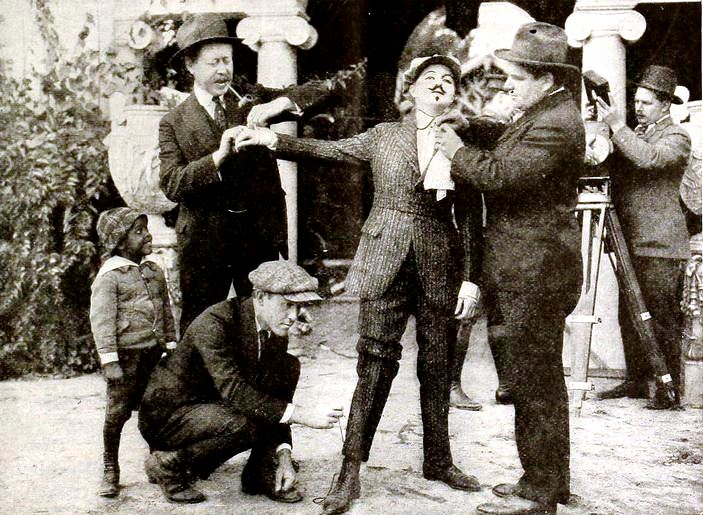
Staged still; with director George D. Baker, with pipe. Ernest "Sunshine Sammy" Morrison, bottom left seven years old.

Peggy Does Her Darndest is a lost 1919 silent film comedy directed by George D. Baker and starring May Allison. It was produced and distributed by Metro Pictures.

Melodramatic comedy of an athletic girl Peggy Ensloe played by May Allison.

== Cast ==
- May Allison as Peggy Ensloe
- Rosemary Theby as Eleanor Ensloe
- Frank Currier as Edward Ensloe
- Augustus Phillips as Lonesome Larry Doyle
- Robert Ellis as Honorable Hugh Wentworth
- Wilton Taylor as Nick Nolan
- Richard Rosson as Bob Ensloe
- Sylvia Ashton as Mrs. Ensloe
- Ernest Morrison as Snowball Snow
