= The Innocent Cheat =

1921 film

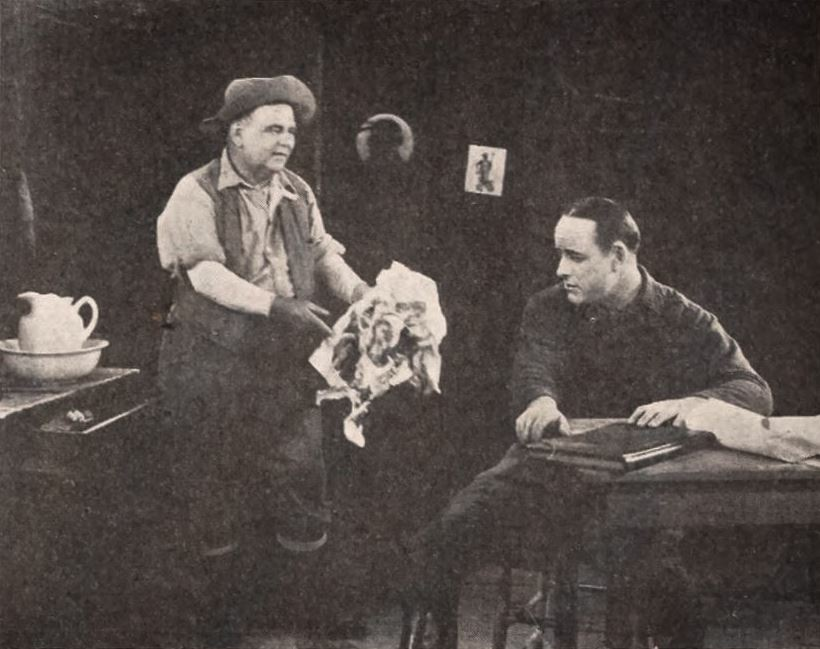
- Directed by: Ben F. Wilson
- Written by: J. Grubb Alexander; Peter B. Kyne
- Produced by: Ben F. Wilson
- Starring: Roy Stewart; Sidney De Gray; Rhea Mitchell
- Cinematography: Harry W. Gerstad
- Production company: Ben Wilson Productions
- Distributed by: Arrow Film Corporation
- Release date: December 26, 1921
- Running time: 60 minutes
- Country: United States
- Languages: Silent; English intertitles

The Innocent Cheat is a 1921 American silent drama film directed by Ben F. Wilson and starring Roy Stewart, Sidney De Gray and Rhea Mitchell.

== Cast ==
- Roy Stewart as John Murdock
- Sidney De Gray as Bruce Stanhope
- George Hernandez as Tim Reilly
- Rhea Mitchell as Peggy Adair
- Kathleen Kirkham as Mary Stanhope

== Bibliography ==
- Munden, Kenneth White. The American Film Institute Catalog of Motion Pictures Produced in the United States, Part 1. University of California Press, 1997.
