= Married to Order =

1920 film

- Directed by: Charley Chase
- Produced by: Nat H. Spitzer
- Starring: Oliver Hardy
- Release date: October 30, 1920
- Running time: 16 minutes
- Country: United States
- Languages: Silent; English intertitles

Married to Order is a 1920 American silent comedy short film featuring Oliver Hardy. Prints of the film survive.

== Cast ==
- Rosemary Theby as Rose
- Oliver Hardy as Her Father (as Babe Hardy)
- Charley Chase as The Suitor
- Leo White
- Bud Ross as Car Salesman (as Budd Ross)

== See also ==
- List of American films of 1920
- Oliver Hardy filmography
