= Bert Lytell =

American actor (1885–1954)

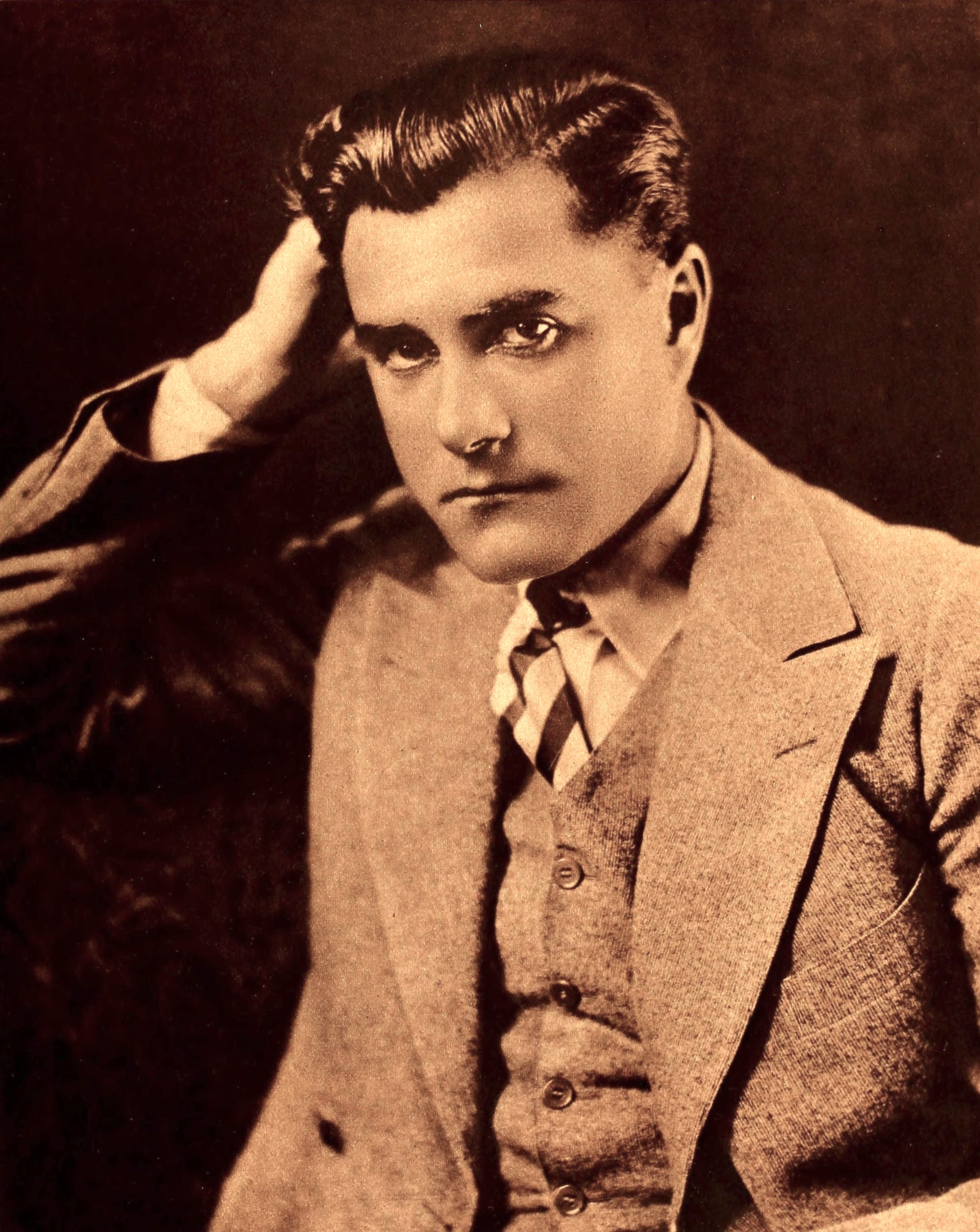
- Lytell, c. 1921
- Born: Bertram Lyttel; February 24, 1885; New York City, US
- Died: September 28, 1954 (aged 69); New York City, US
- Occupation: Actor
- Years active: 1917–1953
- Spouse: Evelyn Vaughn (m. 1910; div. 1924) Claire Windsor (m. 1925; div. 1927)
- Relatives: Wilfred Lytell (brother)

5th President of the Actors' Equity Association
- In office 1940–1946
- Preceded by: Arthur Byron
- Succeeded by: Clarence Derwent

Shepherd of The Lambs
- In office 1947–1952
- Preceded by: Raymond Peck
- Succeeded by: Walter Greaza

Bertram Mortimer Lytell (February 24, 1885 – September 28, 1954) was an American actor in theater and film during the silent film era and early talkies. He starred in romantic, melodrama, and adventure films.

== Background ==
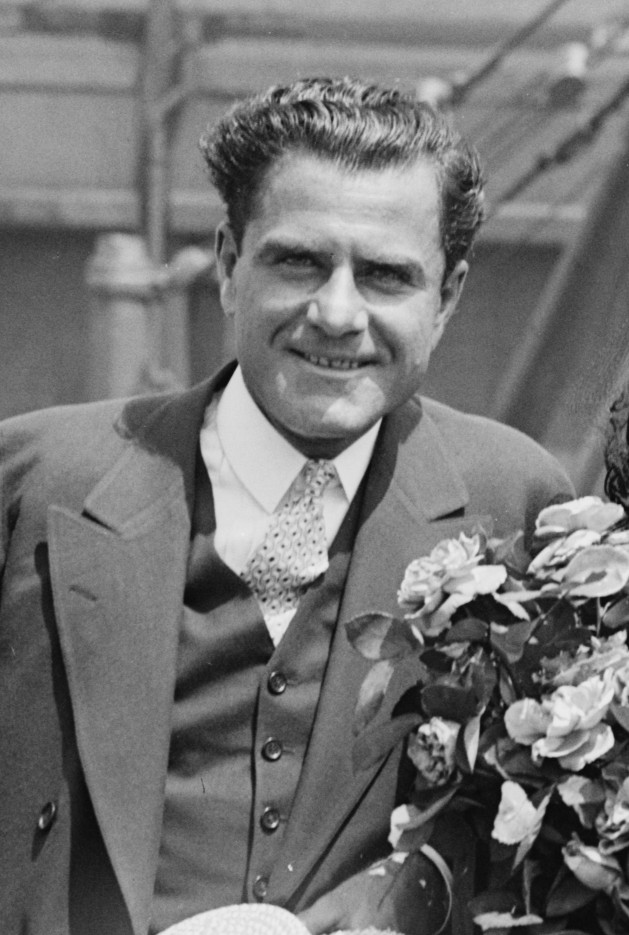
Bert Lytell in 1924

Born in New York City, Lytell was the son of Blanche Mortimer and actor, author, and producer William H. Lytell. His mother was an actress before she married, and her father and grandfather were actors. Lytell left Upper Canada College at age 16 to become an actor.

Lytell's acting debut came with the Columbia Stock Company in Newark, New Jersey, when he was 17 years old. He went on to appear with stock theater companies in Boston, Honolulu, Los Angeles, New Orleans, and Rochester, in addition to heading his own stock troupes in Albany, New York, and San Francisco. He appeared with Marie Dressler in her 1914 Broadway play, A MIX-UP. He also performed in vaudeville in the 1920s with the one-act play The Valiant.

In 1917, Lytell made his film debut starring as Michael Lanyard in The Lone Wolf. He subsequently made four Lone Wolf sequels, ending with The Last of the Lone Wolf (1930). He also starred as Boston Blackie in Boston Blackie's Little Pal (1918) and Blackie's Redemption (1919).

On old-time radio, Lytell had the title role in Alias Jimmy Valentine – a role he had played in the 1920 film of the same name, and was host of Bert Lytell Dramas and Stage Door Canteen.

His younger brother Wilfred Lytell (1891–1954) also became a stage and screen actor. Bert Lytell married a silent film actor, Evelyn Vaughn, in 1910, and they divorced in 1924. He began dating Claire Windsor during the couple's long estrangement, according to the Cal York gossip column in Photoplay, and they married in 1925; they divorced in 1927. Like many other silent screen stars, Lytell's career collapsed after the advent of talking pictures. He worked on NBC daytime shows in the early 1950s while he was Shepherd (President) of the actors club The Lambs from 1947 to 1952. Lytell was named an Immortal Lamb.

In 1936, he directed the film Along Came Love.

Lytell died in New York City, aged 69. His brother Wilfred died 18 days before. He has a star at 6417 Hollywood Avenue in the Motion Picture section of the Hollywood Walk of Fame.

== Selected filmography ==
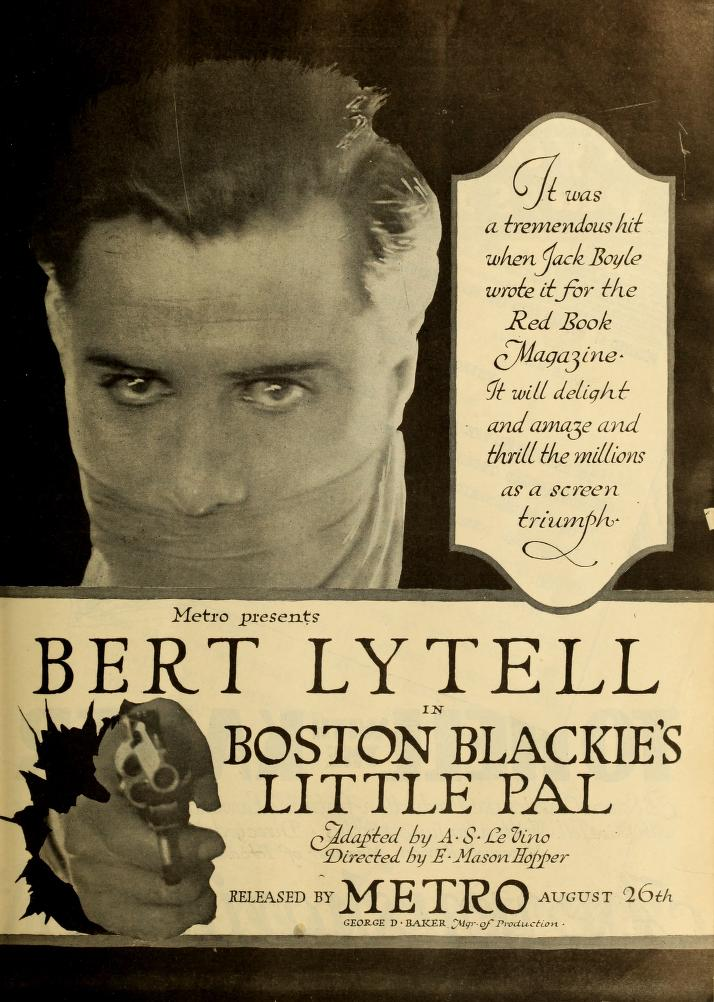
Boston Blackie's Little Pal (1918)

- The Lone Wolf (1917) – Michael Lanyard
- Empty Pockets (1918) – Dr. Clinton Worthing
- The Trail to Yesterday (1918) – Ned 'Dakota' Keegles
- No Man's Land (1918, also co-wrote scenario) – Garrett Cope
- Boston Blackie's Little Pal (1918) – Boston Blackie
- Unexpected Places (1918) – Dick Holloway
- Hitting the High Spots (1918, also co-wrote scenario) – Bob Durland
- The Spender (1919) – Dick Bisbee
- Faith (1919) – George Farrelly
- Blind Man's Eyes (1919) – Hugh Overton, aka Philip D. Eaton
- Blackie's Redemption (1919) – Boston Blackie
- The Lion's Den (1919) – Reverend Sam Webster
- One-Thing-at-a-Time O'Day (1919) – Stradivarius O'Day
- Easy to Make Money (1919) – James 'Jimmy' Frederick Slocum Jr.
- Lombardi, Ltd. (1919) – Tito Lambardi
- The Right of Way (1920) – Charley Steele
- Alias Jimmy Valentine (1920) – Lee Randall / Jimmy Valentine
- The Price of Redemption (1920) – Leigh Dering
- The Misleading Lady (1920) – Jack Craigen
- A Message from Mars (1921) – Horace Parker
- The Man Who (1921) – Bedford Mills
- A Trip to Paradise (1921) – 'Curley' Flynn
- Alias Ladyfingers (1921) – Robert Ashe – Ladyfingers
- A Trip to Paradise (1921, an adaptation of Liliom)
- The Idle Rich (1921) – Samuel Weatherbee
- The Right That Failed (1922) – Johnny Duffey
- A Trip to Paramountown (1922, Documentary short) – Himself
- The Face Between (1922) – Tommy Carteret Sr.
- Sherlock Brown (1922) – William Brown
- To Have and to Hold (1922) – Captain Ralph Percy
- Kick In (1922) – Chick Hewes
- Rupert of Hentzau (1923) – King of Ruritania / Rudolph Rassendyll
- The Meanest Man in the World (1923) – Richard Clark
- The Eternal City (1923) – David Rossi
- A Son of the Sahara (1924) – Raoul Le Breton
- Sandra (1924) – David Waring
- Born Rich (1924) – Jimmy Fairfax
- The Boomerang (1925) – Dr. Sumner
- Steele of the Royal Mounted (1925) – Philip Steele
- Eve's Lover (1925) – Baron Geraldo Maddox
- Never the Twain Shall Meet (1925) – Dan Pritchard
- The Sporting Life (1925) – Lord Woodstock
- The Ship of Souls (1925) – Langley Barnes
- Lady Windermere's Fan (1925) – Lord Windermere
- The Gilded Butterfly (1926) – Brian Anestry
- The Lone Wolf Returns (1926) – Michael Lanyard / The Lone Wolf
- That Model from Paris (1926) – Robert Richmond
- Obey The Law (1926) – Phil Schuyler
- The First Night (1927) – Dr. Richard Bard
- Alias the Lone Wolf (1927) – Michael Lanyard / The Lone Wolf
- Women's Wares (1927) – Robert Crane
- On Trial (1928) – Robert Strickland
- The Lone Wolf's Daughter (1929) – Michael Lanyard / The Lone Wolf
- The Last of the Lone Wolf (1930) – Michael Lanyard
- Brothers (1930) – Bob Naughton / Eddie Connolly
- The Stolen Jools (1931) – Joe Strickland
- Stage Door Canteen (1943) – Canteen Master of Ceremonies
