= Unexpected Places (1918 film) =

1918 US silent film directed by E. Mason Hopper

- Directed by: E. Mason Hopper
- Written by: Albert Shelby Le Vino; George D. Baker
- Based on: the novel, Unexpected Places by Frank R. Adams
- Produced by: George D. Baker
- Starring: Bert Lytell; Rhea Mitchell; Rosemary Theby
- Cinematography: Robert Kurrle
- Production company: Metro Pictures
- Release date: September 30, 1918 (US)
- Running time: 5 reels
- Country: United States
- Language: English

Unexpected Places is a 1918 American silent comedy-drama film directed by E. Mason Hopper and starring Bert Lytell, Rhea Mitchell, and Rosemary Theby. It was released on September 30, 1918.

== Cast list ==
- Bert Lytell as Dick Holloway
- Rhea Mitchell as Ruth Penfield
- Rosemary Theby as Cherie
- Colin Kenny as Lord Harold Varden
- Louis Morrison as Hiram Penfield
- Edythe Chapman as Mrs. Penfield
- John Burton as Jocelyn
- Stanton Heck as Brauer
- Jay Dwiggins as Meyer
- Frank Newberry
- Martin Best
