= The Landloper =

- Directed by: George Irving
- Written by: Fred J. Balshofer (adaptation); John B. Clymer (scenario)
- Based on: The Landloper by Holman Day
- Starring: Harold Lockwood; Pauline Curley; Stanton Heck; William Clifford; Bert Starkey; Gertrude Maloney
- Cinematography: Tony Gaudio
- Production company: Yorke Film Corporation
- Distributed by: Metro Pictures
- Release date: April 1, 1918
- Running time: 50 minutes
- Country: United States
- Languages: Silent film (English intertitles)

The Landloper is a 1918 American silent romance adventure film directed by George Irving and starring Harold Lockwood, Pauline Curley, Stanton Heck, William Clifford, Bert Starkey, and Gertrude Maloney. It is based on the 1915 novel of the same name by Holman Day. The film was released by Metro Pictures on April 1, 1918.

== Cast ==
- Harold Lockwood as Walker Farr
- Pauline Curley as Kate Kilgour
- Stanton Heck as Colonel Simon Dodd
- William Clifford as Richard Dodd
- Bert Starkey as Etienne Pickerone
- Gertrude Maloney as Rose-Marie

== Preservation ==
The film is now considered lost.
