= George D. Baker =

American film director and screenwriter

George Duane Baker
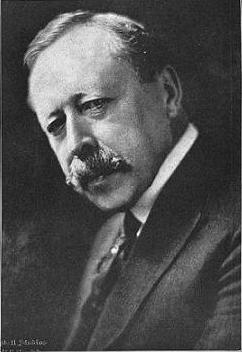
- The First One Hundred Noted Men and Women of the Screen (1920) By Carolyn Lowrey
- Born: George Duane Baker; April 22, 1868; Champaign, Illinois, U.S.
- Died: June 2, 1933 (aged 65); Hollywood, California, U.S.
- Occupations: Actor; playwright; screenwriter; motion picture director

George Duane Baker (April 22, 1868 – June 2, 1933) was an American motion picture director whose career began near the dawn of the silent film era.

== Early life ==
He was born at Champaign, Illinois on April 22, 1868. He was the second son and third child of Arminta and Charles E. Baker. Three or four years later a baby girl would complete the family before Baker's father, an accountant and financial advisor, chose to relocate his family to the rural town of Beatrice, Nebraska sometime in the early 1880s. Upon his high school graduation, Charles Baker offered his son two options, a traditional college education or art classes in Paris. George Baker declined both offers and chose instead to attend the Dramatic Conservatory of Chicago, where he may have first met Walker Whiteside, another student of Prof. Kayzer's from around that time.

== Career ==
He debuted with the young Shakespearian actor Walker Whiteside in Hamlet as Laertes and would later tour with companies headed by Nance O'Neil, McKee Rankin, David Higgins, Russ Wytal Brady and others. Baker spent a number of seasons in vaudeville with Sadie Martinot, Marie Dupont and Eva Taylor. He later worked as a producer, actor and playwright in partnership with James W. Castle on theatrical productions of Graustark, based on the book by George Barr McCutcheon and The Brothers Grimm fairy tale, The Goose Girl. Baker would some years later adapt both stories for film. Baker also penned the plays His Brother’s Birthright and As the Sun Went Down.

Sometime around 1908 Baker joined Vitagraph Studios and began directing comedies starring John Bunny and Flora Finch and later went on direct such films as The Dust of Egypt, Tarantula, A Night Out and A Price for Folly. After three and a half years with Vitagraph, Baker joined Metro Studios where he soon rose to the position of Director General of Metro's West Coast productions.

While vacation in New York, after four years with Metro, Baker received a number of tempting job offers from competing studios. He chose instead to take advantage of his popularity by severing his ties with Metro to work as a freelance director on projects of his own choosing. George Baker wrote the scenarios for a number of the films and was responsible for almost all the continuity work on films he directed. He continued to work well into the 1920s before retiring in his late fifties.

== Death ==
Besides his stage and film work, Baker had also done illustrations for newspapers and magazines and was known as an accomplished still photographer. He was well read with a special interest in the arts. George Duane Baker died at the age of sixty-five on June 2, 1933, in Hollywood, California.

== Selected filmography ==
- 1914 Hearts and Diamonds (Director)
- 1916 The Wager (Screenwriter)
- 1916 The Tarantula (Director/Screenwriter)
- 1916 The Two Edged Sword
- 1917 Sowers and Reapers (Director/Screenwriter)
- 1917 The Lifted Veil (Director)
- 1917 The White Raven (Director)
- 1917 His Father’s Son (Director)
- 1917 Outwitted (Director)
- 1917 The Duchess of Doubt (Director/scenario)
- 1918 The Shell Game (Director)
- 1918 Revelation (Director)
- 1918 Toys of Fate (Director)
- 1918 The Return of Mary (Producer, screenplay)
- 1918 Her Inspiration (Producer, screenplay)
- 1918 No Man's Land (Titles, editor)
- 1918 The Demon (Director, writer)
- 1918 In Judgement Of (Screenwriter)
- 1918 Unexpected Places (Producer, scenario)
- 1918 Hitting the High Spots (Producer, scenario)
- 1919 The Spender (Producer, adaption)
- 1919 As the Sun Went Down (Screenwriter)
- 1919 The Lion’s Den (Director)
- 1919 Peggy Does Her Darndest (Director)
- 1919 Castles in the Air (Director, screenplay)
- 1919 The Cinema Murder (Director)
- 1919 In for Thirty Days (Producer, screenplay)
- 1919 Faith
- 1919 One-Thing-at-a-Time O'Day (Scenario)
- 1919 The Uplifters (Scenario)
- 1920 The Man Who Lost Himself (Director)
- 1920 Heliotrope (Director)
- 1921 Without Limit (Director)
- 1921 Buried Treasure (Director)
- 1921 Proxies (Director)
- 1921 The Hunch (Director)
- 1921 Garments of Truth (Director)
- 1922 Don't Write Letters (Director)
- 1922 I Can Explain (Director)
- 1922 Little Eva Ascends (Director)
- 1923 Slave of Desire (Director)
- 1924 Revelation (Director)
- ? What Shall it Profit (Screenwriter)
- ? Long Live the Queen (Screenwriter)
