= Leonard Penn =

American actor (1907–1975)

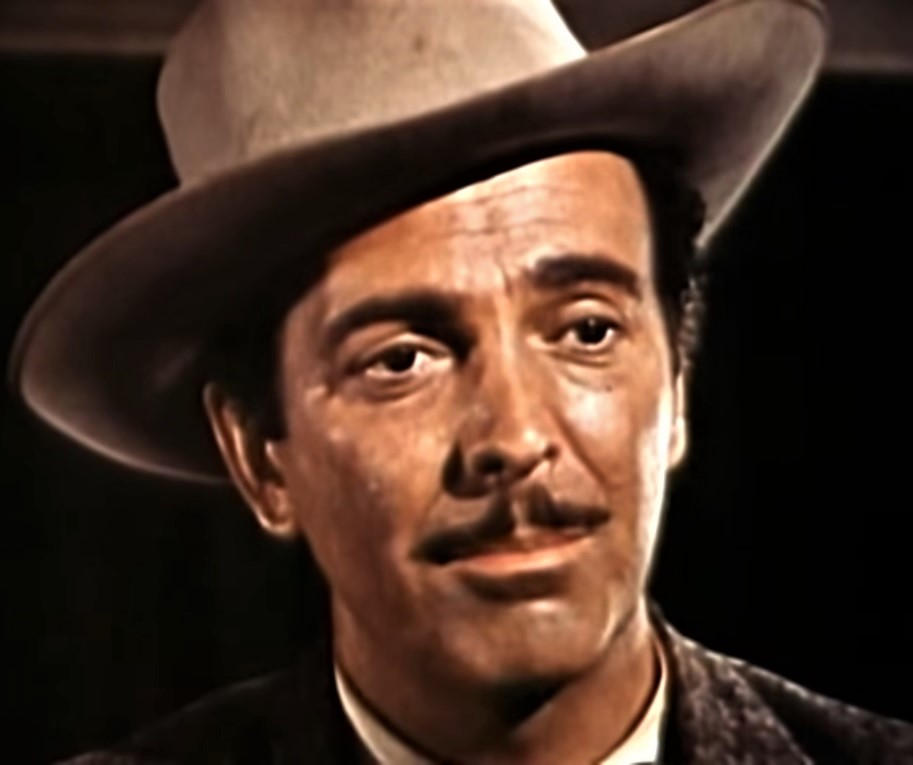
- Born: November 13, 1907; Springfield, Massachusetts, U.S.
- Died: May 20, 1975 (aged 67); Los Angeles, California, U.S.
- Education: Columbia University
- Occupation: Actor
- Years active: 1937–1960
- Spouse: Gladys George (m. 1935; div. 1944)

Leonard Penn (13 November 1907 – 20 May 1975) was an American film, television and theatre actor.

== Early life and education ==
Penn was born in Springfield, Massachusetts, to parents Marcus Penn and Eva Monson. He majored in drama at Columbia University.

During World War II, Penn served in Navy intelligence.

== Career ==
Known for his work in film serials and bit parts in major films, Penn appeared in 81 films and 27 television productions between 1937 and 1960. Penn also appeared in six Broadway-theatre productions in New York City between 1934 and 1941. His Broadway appearances were in The Distant City (1941), Lady in Waiting (1940), Paths of Glory (1935), Field of Ermine (1935), Between Two Worlds (1934), and Personal Appearance (1934).

== Personal life ==
Penn married actress Gladys George in New Haven, Connecticut on September 18, 1935. They remained wed until 1944. They both appeared in Marie Antoinette.

In 1947, Penn married Louise Arthur Sharp in Los Angeles.

== Death ==
On May 20, 1975, Penn died in Los Angeles, California. He was 67 years old.

== Selected filmography ==
- Song of the City (1937) – Fisherboy (uncredited)
- Between Two Women (1937) – Tony Woolcott
- Bad Guy (1937) – First Detective (uncredited)
- The Firefly (1937) – Etienne
- The Women Men Marry (1937) – Quinn
- The Ship That Died (1938) – Bob
- Arsène Lupin Returns (1938) – Reporter (uncredited)
- The Girl of the Golden West (1938) – Pedro
- Judge Hardy's Children (1938) – Steve Prentiss
- Three Comrades (1938) – Tony (uncredited)
- The Toy Wife (1938) – Gaston Vincent
- Ladies in Distress (1938) – Daniel J. Roman
- Woman Against Woman (1938) – Fred Barnes (uncredited)
- Marie Antoinette (1938) – Toulan
- Young Dr. Kildare (1938) – Albert Foster (uncredited)
- Almost A Gentleman (1939) – Arthur Gates
- Bachelor Mother (1939) – Jerome Weiss
- The Day the Bookies Wept (1939) – Man at Racetrack (uncredited)
- The Way of All Flesh (1940) – Joe
- The Best Years of Our Lives (1946) – (uncredited)
- Chick Carter, Detective (1946) – Vasky
- High School Hero (1946) – Prof. Farrell
- Son of the Guardsman (1946) – Mark Crowell
- I Cover Big Town (1947) – Norden Royal
- The Hat Box Mystery (1947) – Stevens
- Killer at Large (1947) – Brent Maddux
- Hoppy's Holiday (1947) – Dunning
- Brick Bradford (1947, Serial) – Eric Byrus
- The Dead Don't Dream (1948) – Earl Wesson
- Partners of the Sunset (1948) – Les
- Superman (1948, Serial) – Electronics Store Owner / Henchman (uncredited)
- The Three Musketeers (1948) – Musketeer (uncredited)
- Outlaw Brand (1948) – Brent
- Congo Bill (1949) – Andre Bocar
- Courtin' Trouble (1949) – Dawson (uncredited)
- Batman and Robin (1949, Serial) – Carter – Hammil's Valet
- The Adventures of Sir Galahad (1949) – Sir Modred – The Black Knight
- Range Land (1949) – Bart Sheldon
- The Pilgrimage Play (1949) – Judas Iscariot
- The Girl from San Lorenzo (1950) – Tom McCarger
- Six Gun Mesa (1950) – Carson
- Women from Headquarters (1950) – Police Officer Allen
- Gunfire (1950) – Dan Simons
- Silver Raiders (1950) – Lance Corbin
- Lonely Heart Bandits (1950) – Detective Stanley
- Law of the Badlands (1951) – Cash Carlton
- The Sword of Monte Cristo (1951) – Conspirator (uncredited)
- Dead or Alive (1951) – Sid Taggart – Gang Leader
- Sirocco (1951) – Rifat (uncredited)
- Stagecoach Driver (1951) – George Barnes
- Mysterious Island (1951, Serial) – Capt. Nemo
- On the Loose (1951) – Dance Judge (uncredited)
- South of Caliente (1951) – Mexican Captain
- The Magic Carpet (1951) – Ramoth's Father – the Caliph (uncredited)
- Thief of Damascus (1952) – Habayah (uncredited)
- A Yank in Indo-China (1952) – Colonel Sablon
- King of the Congo (1952, Serial) – Boris
- Outlaw Women (1952) – Sam Bass
- And Now Tomorrow (1952)
- Barbed Wire (1952) – Steve Ruttledge
- No Holds Barred (1952) – Pete Taylor
- Fangs of the Arctic (1953) – Henchman Morgan
- Savage Mutiny (1953) – Emil Bruno
- The Lost Planet (1953, Serial) – Ken Wopler
- Francis Covers the Big Town (1953) – Brad Mitchell (uncredited)
- Murder Without Tears (1953) – Defense Attorney Parker
- Fort Algiers (1953) – Lt. Picard
- Flame of Calcutta (1953) – Nadir
- Phantom of the Rue Morgue (1954) – Gendarme Dumas (uncredited)
- The Saracen Blade (1954) – Haroun (uncredited)
- King Richard and the Crusaders (1954) – Physician (uncredited)
- A Star Is Born (1954) – Train Station Scene Director (uncredited)
- Drum Beat (1954) – Miller – a Settler (uncredited)
- The Silver Chalice (1954) – Soldier in Banquet Hall (uncredited)
- Day of Triumph (1954) – Pharisee
- Jump Into Hell (1955) – Pvt. Rigault (uncredited)
- To Catch a Thief (1955) – Monaco Policeman (uncredited)
- Menace from Outer Space (1956, TV movie) – Ranger Griff (archive footage)
- The Girl He Left Behind (1956) – Lt. Gen. B.K. Harrison (uncredited)
- In the Money (1958) (last Bowery Boys film) – Don Clarke
- Spartacus (1960) – Garrison Officer (uncredited)

== Selected television ==
Year	Title	Role	Notes
1949	The Lone Ranger	Matt Madrigo	Episode 9 "War Horse"
1951	Marshals in Disguise	Chief Marshal	Episode "Mexican Rustlers Story"
1952	Marshals in Disguise	Jim Moore	Episode "Civilian Clothes"
1953	Death Valley Days	Jonas	Season 1 Episode 11 "The Lady with the Blue Silk Umbrella"
1953	Death Valley Days	Hank Petibone	Season 2, Episode 1, "The Diamond Babe"
1953	Death Valley Days	Henry	Episode "Solomon in All His Glory"
1954	Death Valley Days	Tom Sweeney	Episode "11,000 Miners Can't Be Wrong"
1955	The Life and Legend of Wyatt Earp	Tarp Anders	Episode "The Bank Robbers"
1956	Death Valley Days	Editor Thomas King	Episode "Emperor Norton"
1956	Marshals in Disguise	Riker	Episode "The Iron Major "
1957	The Life and Legend of Wyatt Earp	Pete Burleigh	Episode "Vengeance Trail"
1957	Death Valley Days	John Wycoff	Episode "The Trial of Red Haskell"
1958	Marshals in Disguise	Dale	Episode "Jingles on the Jailroad"
1958	The Life and Legend of Wyatt Earp	Jim Cockrell	Episode "Wyatt Fights"
1958	Death Valley Days	John Tully	Episode "Man on the Run"
