= No Holds Barred (1952 film) =

1952 film by William Beaudine

- Directed by: William Beaudine
- Written by: Tim Ryan; Bert Lawrence; Jack Crutcher
- Produced by: Jerry Thomas
- Starring: Leo Gorcey; Huntz Hall; David Gorcey; Bernard Gorcey
- Cinematography: Ernest Miller
- Edited by: William Austin
- Music by: Edward J. Kay
- Production company: Monogram Pictures
- Distributed by: Monogram Pictures
- Release date: November 23, 1952
- Running time: 65 minutes
- Country: United States
- Language: English

For the 1989 film of the same name starring Hulk Hogan, see No Holds Barred (1989 film).

No Holds Barred is a 1952 American comedy film directed by William Beaudine and starring The Bowery Boys, Marjorie Reynolds and Leonard Penn. The film was released on November 23, 1952, by Monogram Pictures and is the twenty-eighth film in the series.

== Plot ==
Sach's head becomes hard and he feels no pain. As a result, Slip enters him into a wrestling match hoping to win $1,000. However, Sach's strength has disappeared from his head. Luckily they discover that it has traveled to his finger, and he wins the match. Slip decides to enter Sach into more matches, but a rival manager wants to take control. Slip resists the offer and Sach goes onto become world champion, with his power traveling to various parts of his body, including his elbow and toes. The rival manager prevents another wrestler from fighting Sach in a charity match so that his wrestler can go against him. The boys are then kidnapped in the hopes that they will reveal where Sach's power has traveled to. They escape and Sach enters the ring, not knowing where his power is. Slip discovers that it in on Sach's derrière, and uses that knowledge to win the match. In the end, when Slip is about to give Sach a new nickname based upon where his power now lies, Sach says to him, "You say it and we're out of pictures!"

== Cast ==
=== The Bowery Boys ===
- Leo Gorcey as Terrance Aloysius 'Slip' Mahoney
- Huntz Hall as Horace Debussy 'Sach' Jones
- David Gorcey as Chuck (Credited as David Condon)
- Bennie Bartlett as Butch

=== Remaining cast ===
- Bernard Gorcey as Louie Dumbrowski
- Leonard Penn as Peter Taylor
- Marjorie Reynolds as Rhonda Nelson
- Hombre Montana as himself

== Home media ==
Warner Archives released the film on made-to-order DVD in the United States as part of "The Bowery Boys, Volume One" on November 23, 2012.

Preceded by Feudin' Fools; 1952	'The Bowery Boys' movies 1946-1958	Succeeded by Jalopy; 1953
