= Stanton Heck =

American actor (1877-1929)

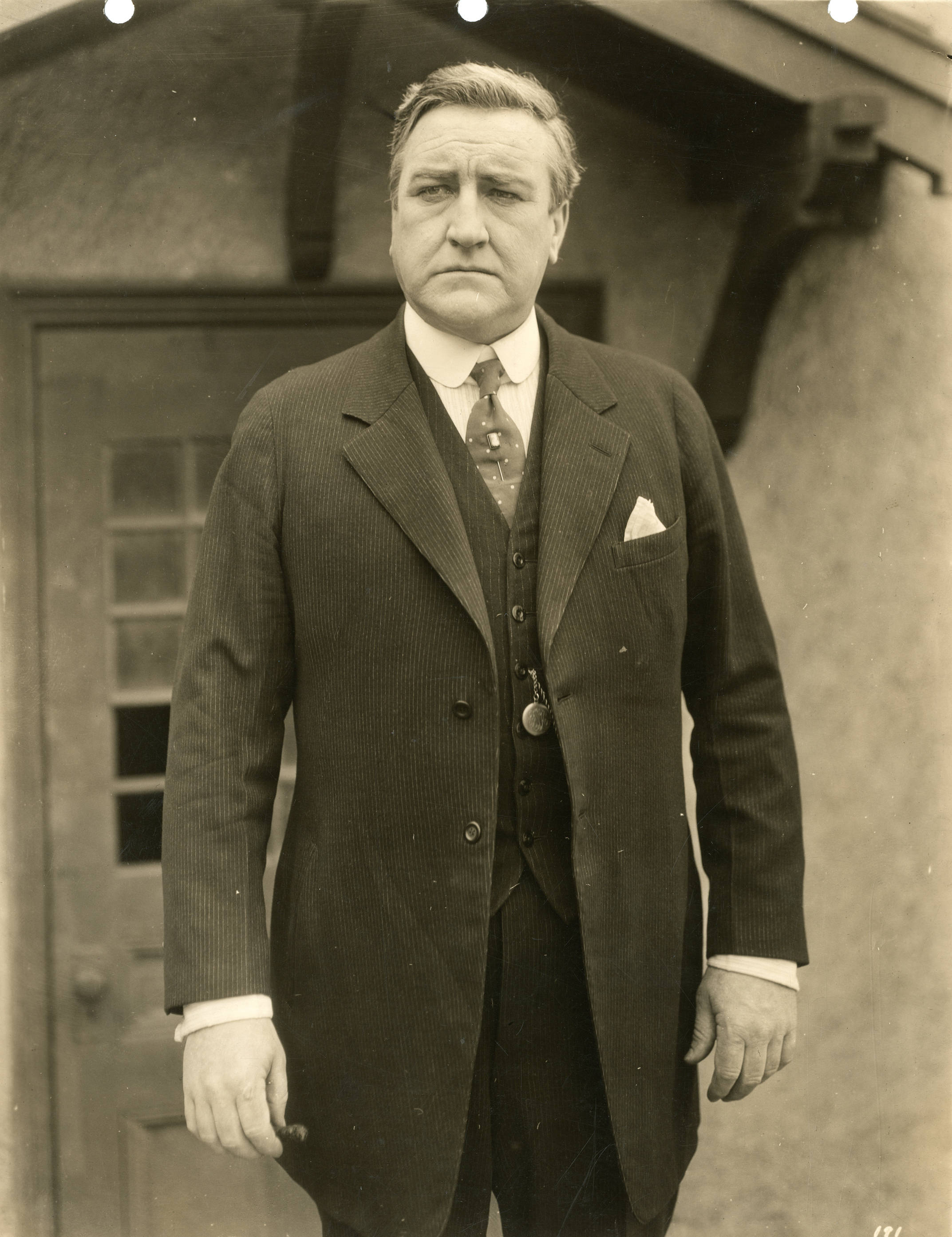
- Heck in 1925
- Born: January 8, 1877; Wilmington, Delaware, U.S.
- Died: December 16, 1929 (aged 52); Los Angeles, California, U.S.
- Other name: Stanley Heck
- Occupation: Actor
- Years active: 1918–1928

Stanton Heck (January 8, 1877 – December 16, 1929), was an American actor of the silent era. He appeared in 50 films between 1918 and 1928. Earlier in his career, he appeared on stage in musicals such as 1906's A Parisian Model.

== Partial filmography ==
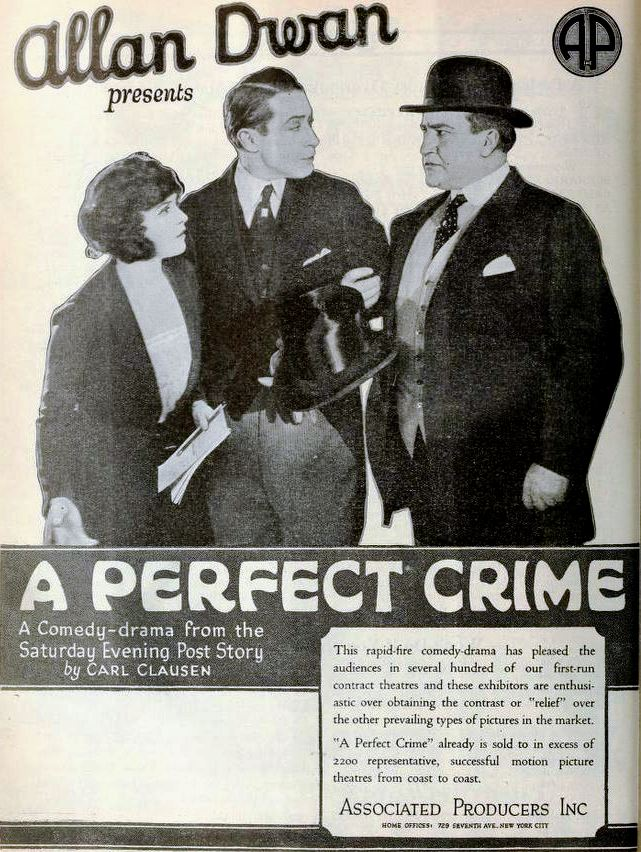
Heck (right) in film promotion in Wid's Daily, 1921

- Broadway Bill (1918)
- The Landloper (1918)
- He's in Again (1918)
- Unexpected Places (1918)
- Hitting the High Spots (1918)
- The Hawk's Trail (1919)
- One-Thing-at-a-Time O'Day (1919)
- Easy to Make Money (1919)
- Pink Tights (1920)
- The Money Changers (1920)
- A Perfect Crime (1921)
- Scrap Iron (1921)
- The Power of a Lie (1922)
- The Gray Dawn (1922)
- Ashes (1922)
- Man's Size (1923)
- Hearts Aflame (1923)
- The Lone Star Ranger (1923)
- The Woman on the Jury (1924)
- White Man (1924)
- One Law for the Woman (1924)
- Soft Shoes (1925)
- Silent Sanderson (1925)
- The Mystic (1925)
- Old Clothes (1925)
- The Fighting Demon (1925)
- The Verdict (1925)
- Driftin' Thru (1926)
- The Bat (1926)
- Rustlers' Ranch (1926)
- The Gentle Cyclone (1926)
- Her Honor, the Governor (1926)
- The Branded Sombrero (1928)
