= Rosemary Theby =

American actress (1892–1973)

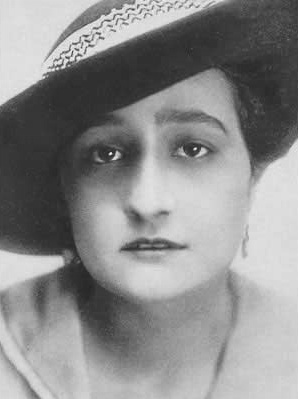
- Theby in 1916
- Born: Rose Masing; April 8, 1892; St. Louis, Missouri, U.S.
- Died: November 10, 1973 (aged 81); Los Angeles, California, U.S.
- Occupation: Actress
- Years active: 1911–1940
- Spouses: Harry Myers (m. 1915; died 1938) Truitt Hughes (m. 1938)

Rosemary Theresa Theby (born Rose Masing, April 8, 1892 – November 10, 1973) was an American film actress. She appeared in some 250 films between 1911 and 1940.

== Early life and career ==
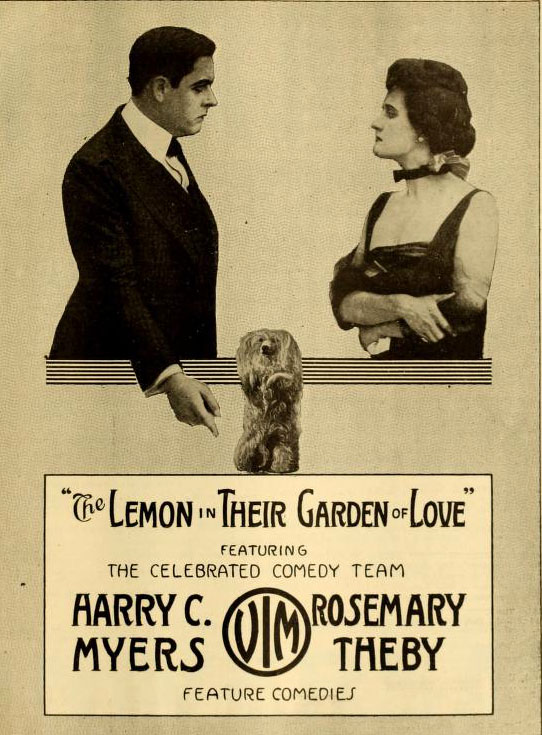
The Lemon in Their Garden of Love (1916)

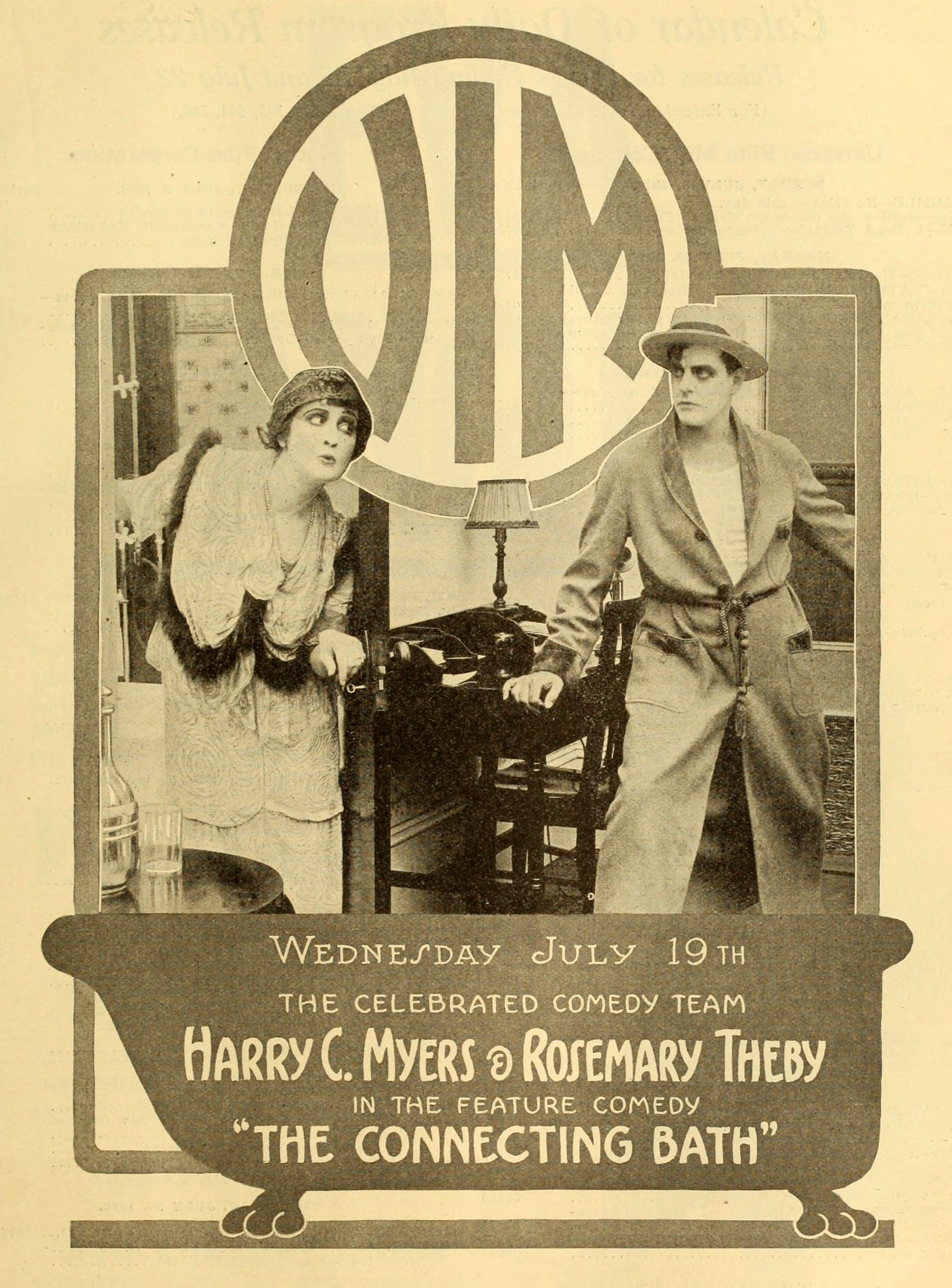
The Connecting Bath (1916)

The daughter of George and Katherine Masing, Theby was born in St. Louis, Missouri. She studied at the Convent of St. Alphonsus in St. Louis and at Sargent's School in New York City. A contemporary newspaper account described her as being of "medium-height, well proportioned, with regular features and dark hair".

Theby began working with Vitagraph studios in 1910. Her first film experience came in that company's production of The Wager. By 1915, she was a star for the Universal film company. During World War I Theby took care of a refugee from Lithuania. After being educated and cared for by Theby, the young woman became her maid during a time of an acute shortage of maids in Hollywood, in 1920.

As Miss Corintee in The Great Love (1918), Theby played the part of a German spy with great skill. The film was written and directed by D. W. Griffith. This was a femme fatale, or "vampire," role, which she began to play frequently after depicting characters in slapstick comedies. Theby played a Chinese "vamp" in Clung, a Fox Film production directed by Emmett J. Flynn. Later she began to portray more serious women.

Theby was solely a film actress. She declined an offer to accompany Chauncey Olcott to appear on stage for $85 per week. At the time she was earning $125 weekly in movies. She later regretted her decision because of the experience she would have gained.

Thelby's career included Westerns and serials.

== Personal life ==
Theby was married to fellow actor and director Harry Myers. After Myers' death in 1938, she married Truitt Hughes to whom she remained married until her death. She lived for years at 1907 Wilcox Avenue in Los Angeles.

Theby supported Calvin Coolidge in the 1924 presidential election. Theby enjoyed playing golf, wore her hair in a bob cut, and possessed a preoccupation with personal cleanliness. On screen she appeared tall and willowy, entering a scene, according to one review in the Los Angeles Times, with a "sensuous glide".

Theby died of circulatory shock on November 10, 1973, at the age of 81.

== Selected filmography ==
- As You Like It (1912)
- Mills of the Gods (1912)
- One Can't Always Tell (1913)
- Baby (1915)
- The Winged Mystery (1917)
- The Silent Mystery (1918)
- The Great Love (1918)
- The Rogue (1918)
- Bright and Early (1918)
- Boston Blackie's Little Pal (1918)
- Unexpected Places (1918)
- The Spender (1919)
- Faith (1919)
- Peggy Does Her Darndest (1919)
- Are You Legally Married? (1919)
- Heartsease (1919)
- The Amateur Adventuress (1919)
- Tangled Threads (1919)
- Yvonne from Paris (1919)
- The Mystery of 13 (1919)
- Terror Island (1920)
- Rio Grande (1920)
- Married to Order (1920)
- Kismet (1920)
- Dice of Destiny (1920)
- A Splendid Hazard (1920)
- Whispering Devils (1920)
- The Butterfly Man (1920)
- The Little Grey Mouse (1920)
- Unseen Forces (1920)
- A Connecticut Yankee in King Arthur's Court (1921)
- Shame (1921)
- Across the Divide (1921)
- Fightin' Mad (1921)
- The Last Trail (1921)
- Good Women (1921)
- Partners of Fate (1921)
- Hickville to Broadway (1921)
- I Am the Law (1922)
- Rich Men's Wives (1922)
- More to Be Pitied Than Scorned (1922)
- Your Friend and Mine (1923)
- Lost and Found on a South Sea Island (1923)
- The Girl of the Golden West (1923)
- Slander the Woman (1923)
- In Search of a Thrill (1923)
- Mary of the Movies (1923) – cameo
- The Eagle's Feather (1923)
- Pagan Passions (1924)
- A Son of the Sahara (1924)
- Behold This Woman (1924)
- The Red Lily (1924)
- Secrets of the Night (1924)
- So Big (1924)
- As Man Desires (1925)
- Fifth Avenue Models (1925)
- One Year to Live (1925)
- Wreckage (1925)
- The Truthful Sex (1926)
- Riding to Fame (1927)
- A Bowery Cinderella (1927)
- The Second Hundred Years (1927)
- A Woman Against the World (1928)
- The Port of Missing Girls (1928)
- The Dream Melody (1929)
- Montmartre Rose (1929)
- Midnight Daddies (1930)
- Ten Nights in a Barroom (1931)
- The Fatal Glass of Beer (1933)
- Man on the Flying Trapeze (1935)
- Rich Relations (1937)
- One Million B.C. (1940)
