= Cal York =

Pseudonym for Photoplay magazine editors

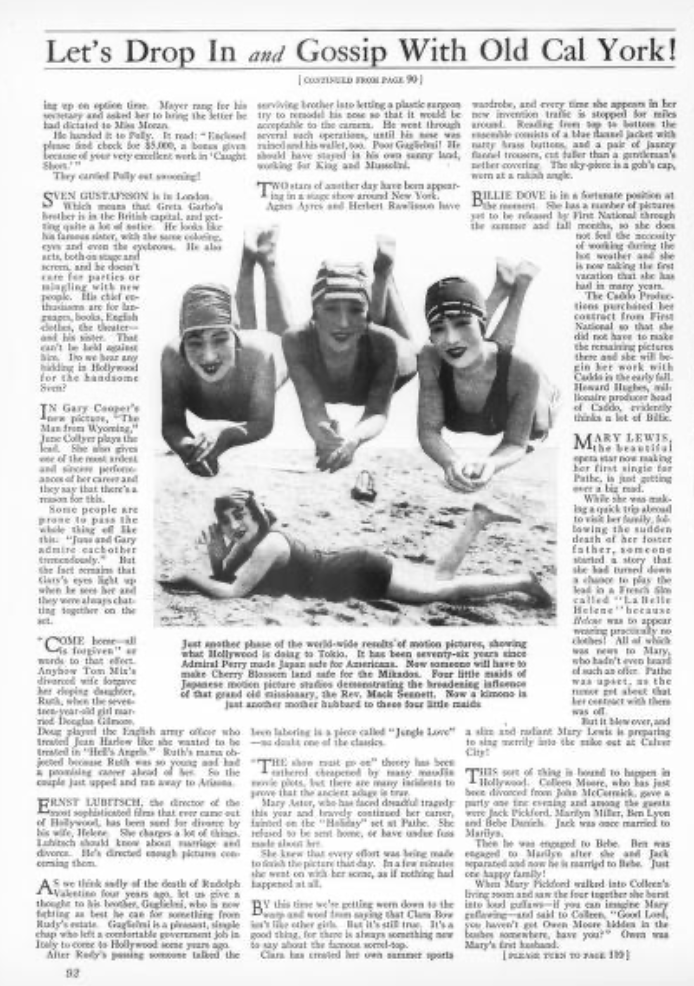
Example of the "Cal York" column in Photoplay magazine, 1928.

Cal York, an amalgam of California and New York, was a pseudonymous name used in the American film magazine Photoplay that ran from 1911 to 1980. Popular entertainment scholar Anthony Slide considered it one of the most reliable voices in the old Hollywood gossip columns. York (presumably the editors) was the "columnist" for "Inside Stuff," and also a contributor to other parts of the magazine, including "Plays and Players." Not every film scholar seems aware of the pseudonym, as many quote York without noting the meaning behind the name. Slide notes that the surname York once morphed to Yorke, assuming a typo, but it may also have been an inside joke. He adds that toward the end of the magazine's life West Coast editor Richard Cuskelly wrote as Cal York. By the 1970s Photoplay was still using the old name, but Slide considered it an echo of the past.

There was also a character named Cal York in the 1955 American drama Toughest Man Alive, and it may have been a wink to the long-running character.
