= On the Night Stage =

1915 film directed by Reginald Barker

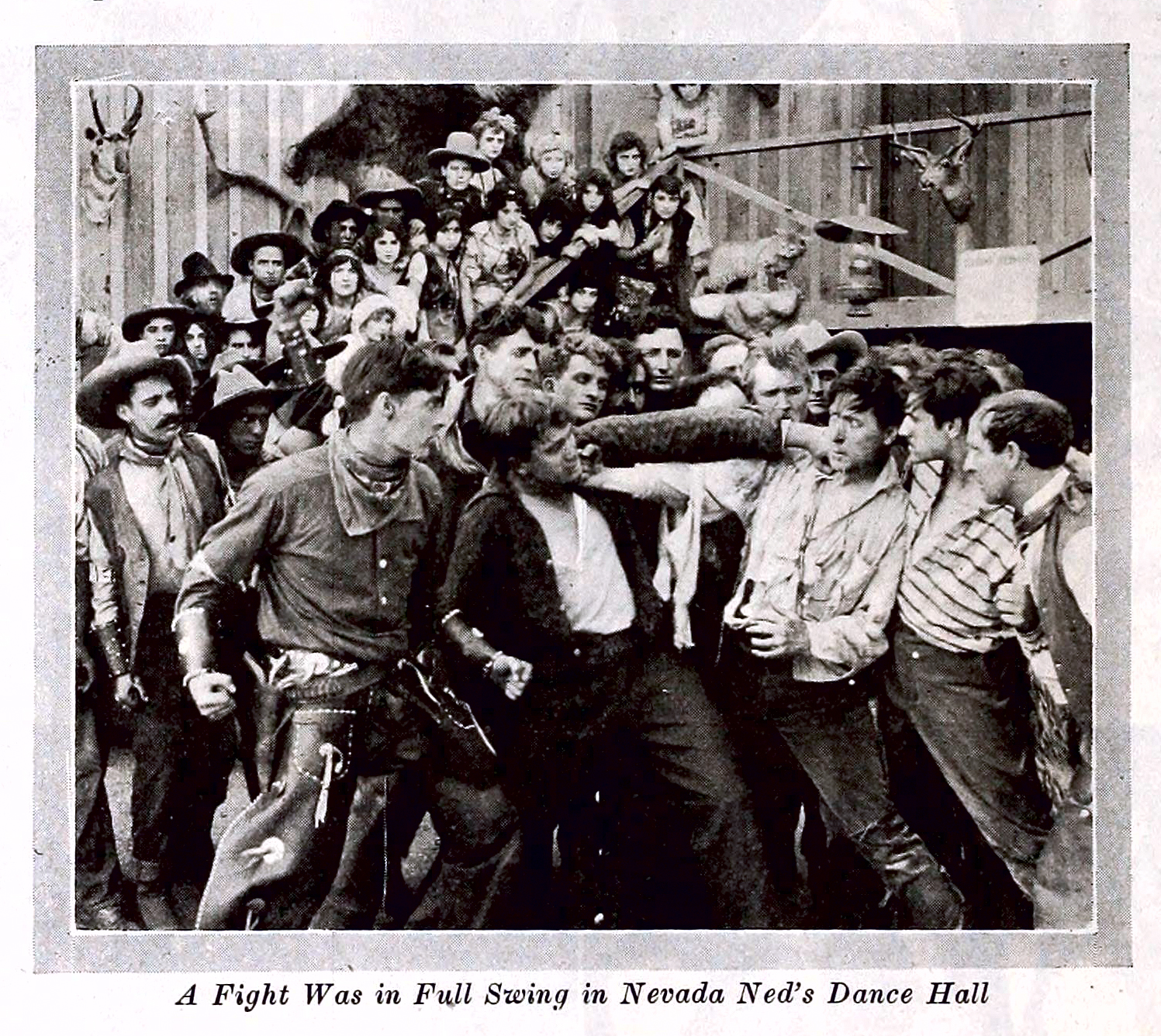
- Still with Hart (front, left) at fight in Nevada Ned's Place
- Directed by: Reginald Barker
- Written by: C. Gardner Sullivan (story); Thomas H. Ince (scenario)
- Starring: William S. Hart
- Production company: New York Motion Picture
- Distributed by: Mutual Film
- Release date: 1915
- Running time: 62 minutes
- Country: United States
- Languages: Silent; English intertitles

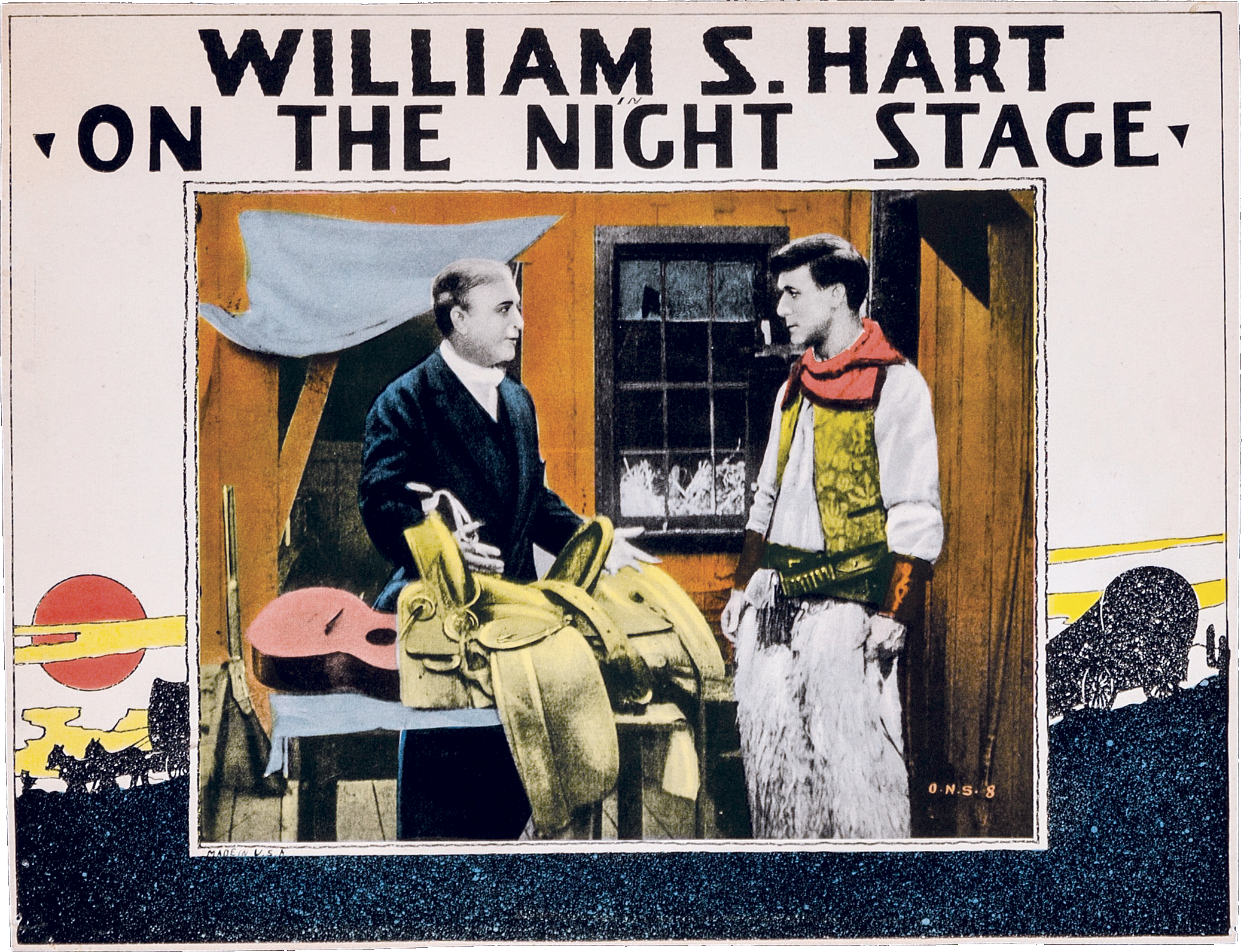
Lobby card

On the Night Stage is a 1915 American silent Western film directed by Reginald Barker and starring William S. Hart and Rhea Mitchell. The film is based upon a story by C. Gardner Sullivan with the scenario written by Thomas H. Ince. A copy of the film is held by the Library of Congress and several other film archives.

== Plot ==
Saloon girl Belle Shields falls in love with and marries Alexander Austin, the town's new pastor, much to the chagrin of her sweetheart, "Silent" Texas Smith. Texas smolders with jealousy until Alexander lends him a fist during a bar fight, marking the beginning of a strong, respected friendship. Belle, having reformed herself into a proper pastor's wife, slips back into her old ways, and must rely on Texas to save her from the advances of a foppish gambler.

== Cast ==
- William S. Hart as Texas
- Rhea Mitchell as Belle Shields
- Robert Edeson as Austin, "The Skypilot"
- Herschel Mayall as Handsome Jack Malone
