= The Ship That Died =

1938 film

- Directed by: Jacques Tourneur
- Written by: George Sayer
- Starring: John Nesbitt; Leonard Penn; Rhea Mitchell
- Cinematography: Lester White
- Production company: Metro-Goldwyn-Mayer (MGM)
- Distributed by: Metro-Goldwyn-Mayer (MGM)
- Release date: February 19, 1938
- Running time: 10 minutes
- Country: United States
- Language: English

The Ship That Died is a 1938 American short film directed by Jacques Tourneur for MGM. Written by George Sayer and featuring John Nesbitt, Leonard Penn, and Rhea Mitchell, it presents dramatisations of a range of theories (mutiny, fear of explosion due to alcohol fumes, and the supernatural) of the ship Mary Celeste.

== Plot ==
The film opens on a clear and brilliant day in the harbour of old New York. The morning tide was a familiar scene, putting many ships out to sea. There was a bustle of men taking on cargo, and men saying goodbye to people they wouldn't see again until spring. There was sunlight, a good wind, and the tang of salt in the air.

The narrator explains this is all perfectly normal, except for that this is also a true story about a murder, but not the murder of a person, rather it is a story of the murder of a haunted ship, the "ship that died".

November 7, 1872, the sailing yacht emblazoned with the name Mary Celeste is spotted at latitude 370 North, longitude 18 west. The Mary Celeste is under Full Sail, but when the crew of the ship that spotted the Mary Celeste boards it, they find out that there is no one on board. A search of the vessel reveals that the Longboat is secured on the deck, a barrel of alcohol is open with some missing, the Captain's Log book has the last pages torn out (but his watch still keeps time), and there is a large knife stained with rust or blood found stored in the captain's quarters.

December 1872, in the famed nautical Club at the Rock of Gibraltar, a group of people meet to hypothesize the reason why the Mary Celeste was abandoned.

Three theories were proposed:

1. The ship's crew got drunk and muntanied against their captain.

2. The ship was abandoned because there was a fear of fire when the alcohol leak was discovered.

3. Some unknown force is responsible.

The film ends with the narrator acknowledging that the only thing they really know is that there were people on the ship, then later on, there wasn't anybody on the ship.

== Cast ==
- John Nesbitt as Narrator (voice)
- Leonard Penn as Rescue Ship Crewman
- Rhea Mitchell as Passenger on Marie Celeste
- Harry Allen as Bos'n of Rescue Ship
- Lee Prather as Undetermined Secondary Role
- Richard Alexander as Crewman of Marie Celeste
