= Henry Woodruff =

American actor

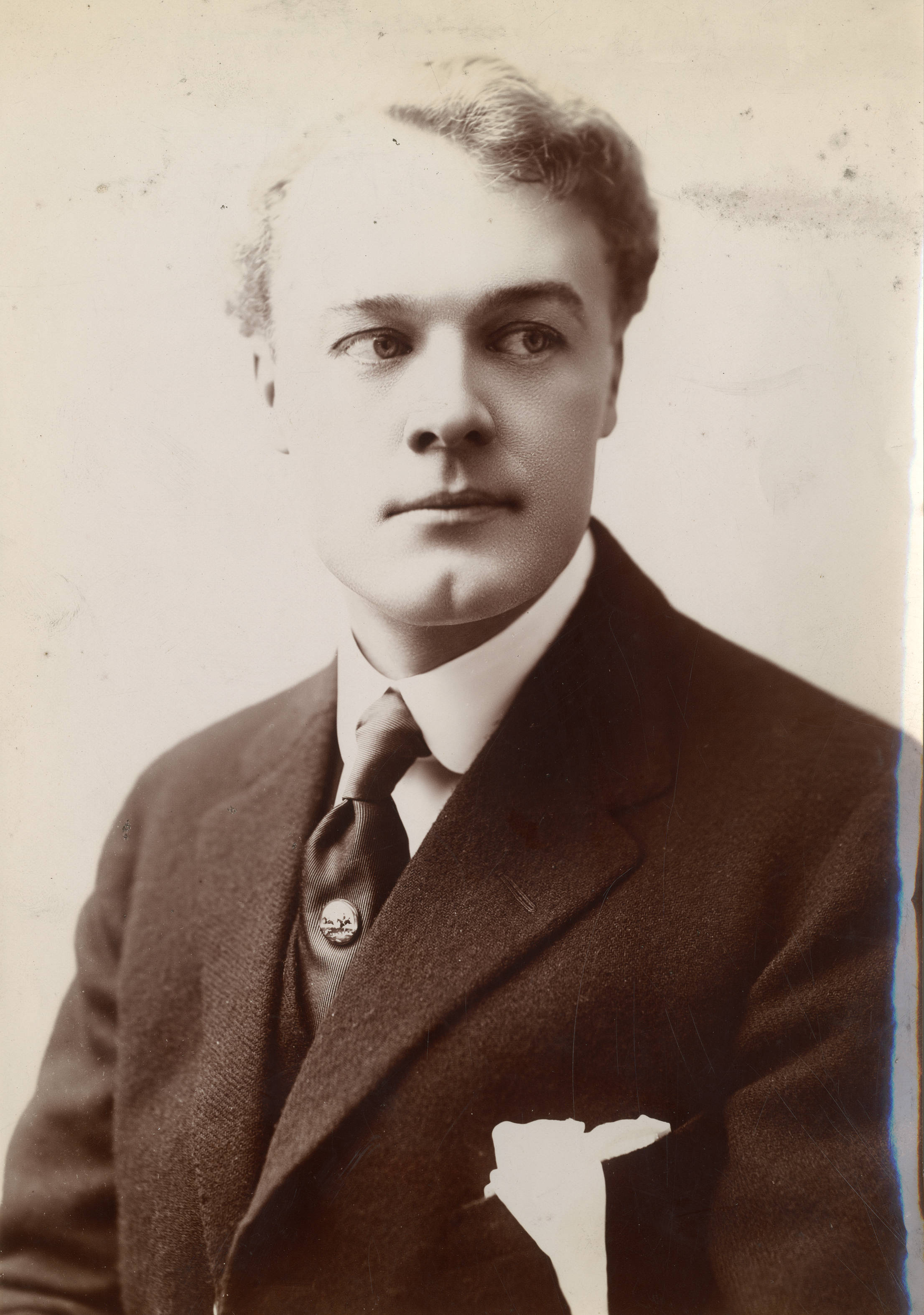
- Born: Henry Ingott Woodruff; June 1, 1869; Hartford, Connecticut
- Died: October 6, 1916 (aged 47); New York City, New York
- Other name: Harry Woodruff
- Occupation: Actor
- Years active: 1879-1916

Henry Ingott Woodruff (June 1, 1869 – October 6, 1916) was an American stage and silent film actor. He's remembered for starring in the original Broadway play Brown of Harvard in 1905.

== Early life ==
He was born the son of Samuel V. Woodruff, a wealthy New York businessman, and first appeared on stage at nine in the 1879 juvenile company of H.M.S. Pinafore. He acted with Daniel E. Bandmann and Adelaide Neilson. He later attended Harvard University and after graduating returned to acting.

== Career ==
In 1893, Woodruff was in the first U.S. presentation of Brandon Thomas's Charley's Aunt, playing the part of Charley Wykeham. Over time he showed his range in Shakespeare, musical comedy, drama and farces. He appeared on stage with Julia Marlowe, William Collier Sr. and Amelia Bingham. In 1901 he created the role Edward Warden in the original production of Clyde Fitch's The Climbers at the Bijou Theatre. In 1902 he was in the cast of Mary of Magdala with Mrs. Fiske and Rose Eytinge. In 1906 he scored a huge personal hit on Broadway in Brown of Harvard. Woodruff had attended Harvard and the play was filmed several times.

In 1915, Woodruff appeared in two silent films, A Man and His Mate and The Beckoning Flame, the latter apparently survives in the Library of Congress.

== Membership of The Lambs ==
Woodruff was elected to The Lambs Club in 1890 and later served terms as Boy (vice president).

== Death ==
Woodruff died of Bright's Disease in New York.
