= Boston Blackie's Little Pal =

1918 film directed by E. Mason Hopper

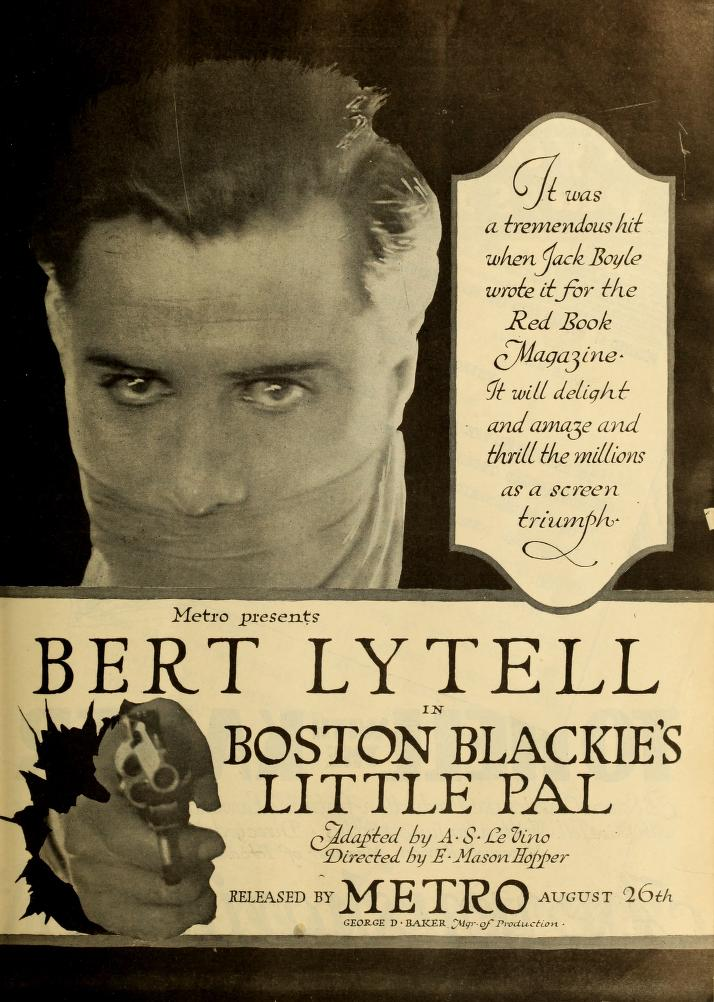
- Advertisement for the film
- Directed by: E. Mason Hopper
- Written by: Albert S. Le Vino
- Based on: the short story, "Boston Blackie's Little Pal" by Jack Boyle
- Starring: Bert Lytell; Rhea Mitchell; Rosemary Theby
- Cinematography: Robert B. Kurrle
- Production company: Metro Pictures
- Release date: August 26, 1918 (US)
- Running time: 5 reels
- Country: United States
- Language: English

Boston Blackie's Little Pal is a lost 1918 American silent drama film, directed by E. Mason Hopper. It stars Bert Lytell, Rhea Mitchell, and Rosemary Theby, and was released on August 26, 1918.

== Plot ==
Boston Blackie, a notorious criminal, has his eyes on the jewelry at the Wilmerding mansion. To aid in the heist, his accomplice, Mary, secures a position as a nurse to care for the Wilmerdings' young child, Martin Wilmerding Jr. The thieves plan the robbery for an evening when Mr. Wilmerding will be absent and Mrs. Wilmerding is attending a charity ball.

On the evening of the heist, Mary lets Blackie in after Mrs. Wilmerding leaves for the ball. As he is trying to crack the safe, young Wilmerding enters looking for a toy. Blackie distracts him by playing with him, and the two form a bond before Blackie takes him back to bed. As he is going back to the safe, the interruption has lasted so long, Mrs. Wilmerding is returning home. But she is not alone, she has her lover, Donald Lavalle, with her. Blackie hides, intending to wait until the two leave, but he overhears the two lovers planning to run away together, taking Wilmerding's jewels with them. When Mrs. Wilmerding goes upstairs to pack a bag, Blackie confronts Lavalle pretending to be Mr. Wilmerding. Lavalle surrenders the jewels and beats a hasty retreat, with Blackie promising to kill him if he ever approaches Mrs. Wilmerding again.

Blackie, through a series of telegrams, appeals to the maternal instincts of Mrs. Wilmerding, getting her to reconcile with her husband. That job complete, Blackie debates about whether or not to return the jewels.

== Cast list ==
- Bert Lytell as Boston Blackie
- Rhea Mitchell as Mary
- Rosemary Theby as Mrs. Wilmerding
- Joel Jacobs as Martin Wilmerding, Jr.
- Howard Davies as Donald Lavalle
- John Burton as Jackson, the butler
- Frank Whitson as Martin Wilmerding

== Production ==
In late June 1918 it was released that Lytell's next film for Metro would be Boston Blackie's Little Pal. It would be his third film for the studio, with filming to start in the first week of July. Albert S. Le Vino had been selected to adapt the story for the screen, and E. Mason Hopper would be taking the directing helm. In early July 1918 it Metro announced that Rhea Mitchell had been cast in the lead role of Mary, opposite Bert Lytell. The film was scheduled to be shot at Metro's west coast studio in Hollywood. This was the first time Lytell and Mitchell had worked on-screen together, although Mitchell had been the ingenue in the Alcazar Stock Company several years earlier when Lytell was the company's leading man. The role of Boston Blackie was based on the stories of Jack Boyle which appeared in Redbook Magazine. This was the first screen appearance of the Boston Blackie character. The picture was released on August 26, 1918.

== Reception ==
Exhibitors Herald gave the film a very positive review, ranking the overall production "very good", and the story and star as "excellent". They extolled Lytell's performance in what they called a "unique role", and highlighted the work of his supporting cast, including Rhea Mitchell, Rosemary Theby, Frank Whitson, and Howard Davies. They called the cinematography "perfect".
