= Charles Swickard =

German-born American actor and film director

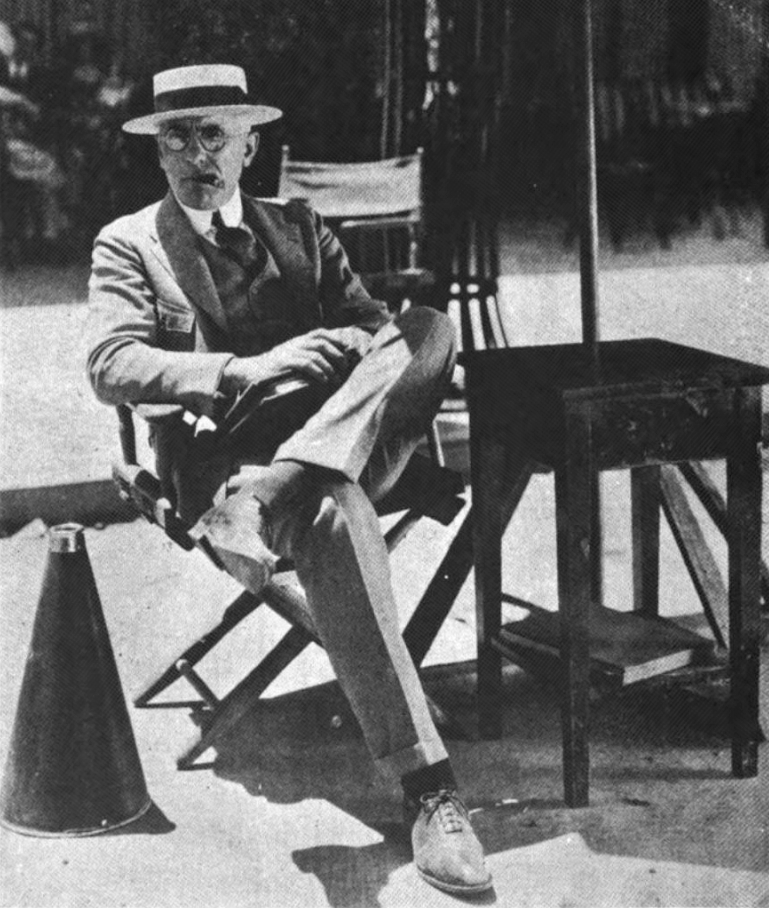
- Born: Johann Schwickerath; March 21, 1861; Alf, Kingdom of Prussia
- Died: May 12, 1929 (aged 68); Fresno, California, United States
- Occupations: Actor, director
- Years active: 1914–1920 (film)

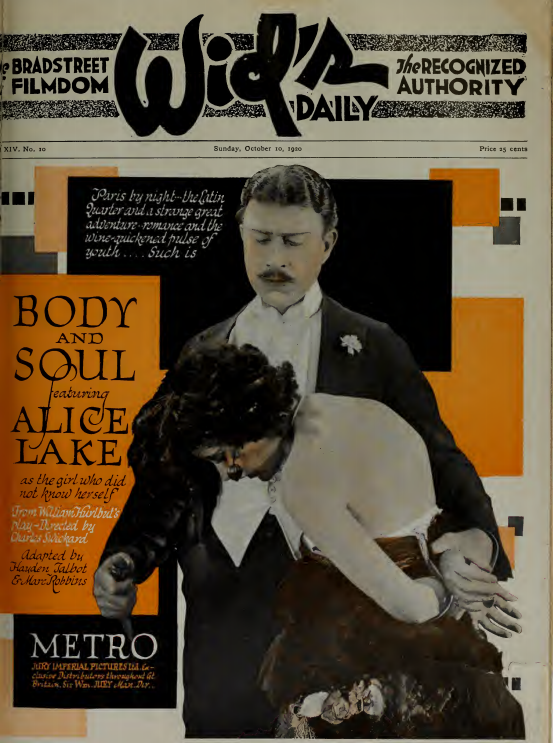
Alice Lake in the film Body and Soul (1920)

Charles F. Swickard (March 21, 1861 – May 12, 1929) was a German-born American actor and film director of the silent era. He was the brother of the actor Josef Swickard.

== Selected filmography ==
=== Director ===
- The Beckoning Flame (1915)
- The Three Musketeers (1916)
- Hell's Hinges (1916)
- Mixed Blood (1916)
- The Beggar of Cawnpore (1916)
- The Raiders (1916)
- The Beckoning Flame (1916)
- The Lair of the Wolf (1917)
- The Plow Woman (1917)
- The Scarlet Crystal (1917)
- The Gates of Doom (1917)
- The Phantom's Secret (1917)
- The Light of Western Stars (1918)
- Hitting the High Spots (1918)
- The Spender (1919)
- Faith (1919)
- Li Ting Lang (1920)
- An Arabian Knight (1920)
- The Last Straw (1920)

== Bibliography ==
- George A. Katchmer. A Biographical Dictionary of Silent Film Western Actors and Actresses. McFarland, 2002.
