= Rhea Mitchell =

American actress and screenwriter (1890–1957)

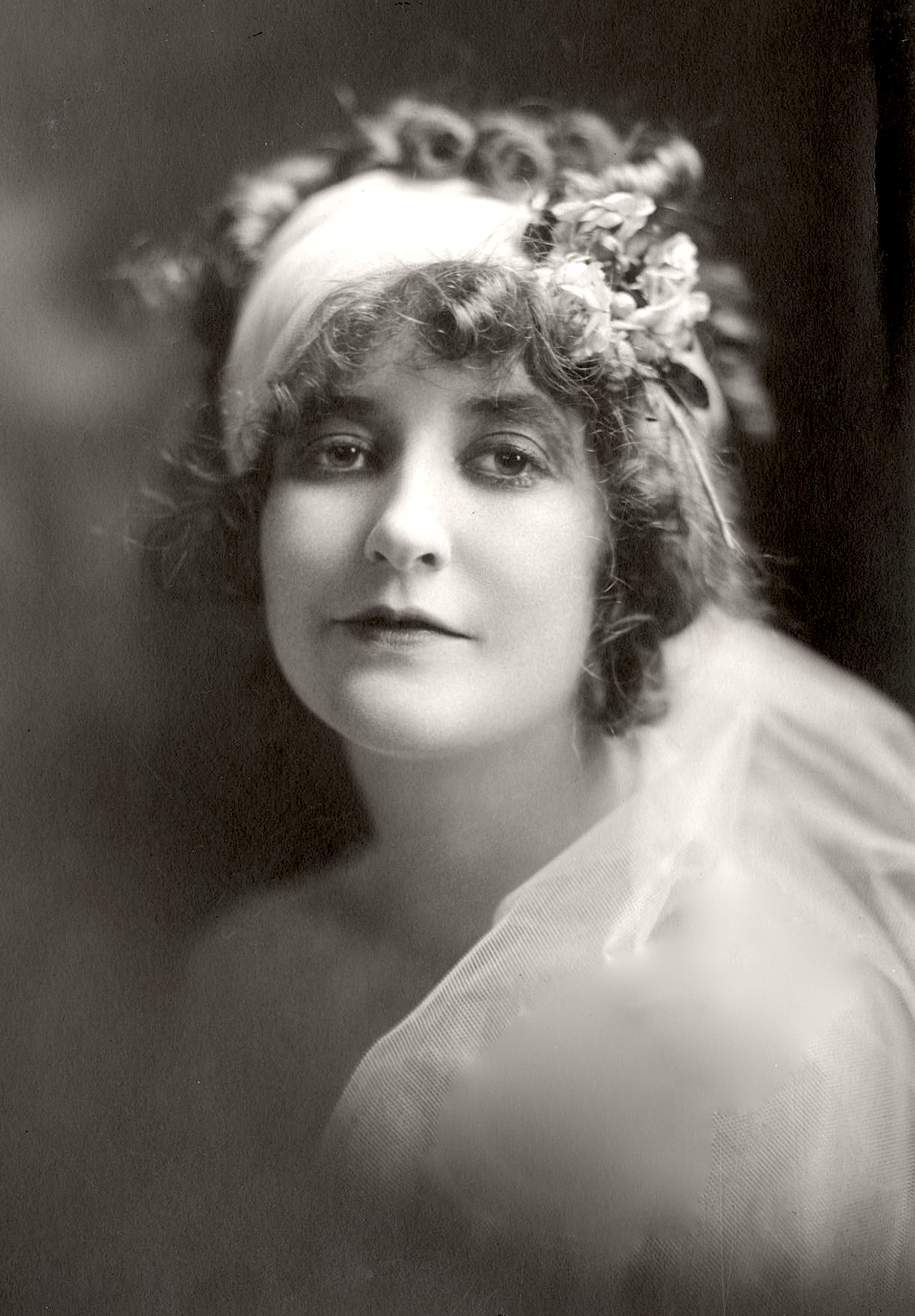
- Mitchell in 1911
- Born: Rhea Ginger Mitchell; December 10, 1890; Portland, Oregon, U.S.
- Died: September 16, 1957 (aged 66); Los Angeles, California, U.S.
- Resting place: Hollywood Forever Cemetery
- Occupations: Actress, screenwriter
- Years active: 1912–1952

Rhea Ginger Mitchell (December 10, 1890 – September 16, 1957) was an American film actress and screenwriter who appeared in over 100 films, mainly during the silent era. A native of Portland, Oregon, Mitchell began her acting career in local theater, and joined the Baker Stock Company after completing high school. She appeared in various regional theater productions on the West Coast between 1911 and 1913.

In 1912, Mitchell signed with the New York Motion Picture Corporation, making her film debut in The Colonel's Ward, directed by Edward LeSaint. In her early career, she earned the name of "the little stunt girl" because of her willingness to attempt thrilling scenes in motion pictures. Her first major role was in On the Night Stage (1915), followed by a part in The Diamond from the Sky, a serial film starring Lottie Pickford.

Through the mid-1910s Mitchell appeared in numerous Western films with William S. Hart. Following the advent of sound pictures, Mitchell continued to work in film, though often appearing uncredited, before retiring in 1952. Some of her later roles include minor uncredited parts in Green Dolphin Street (1947), State of the Union (1948), and Stars in My Crown (1950).

Mitchell spent her subsequent retirement years as the resident manager of an apartment building in west Los Angeles. On September 16, 1957, she was murdered in the building by Sonnie Hartford, Jr., a houseboy who also worked there. Hartford pleaded guilty to second-degree murder in her homicide, and was sentenced five years to life in prison. Mitchell is interred at the Hollywood Forever Cemetery.

== Life and career ==
=== 1890–1913: Early life and theater ===
Rhea Ginger Mitchell was born on December 10, 1890, in Portland, Oregon, to Lillie and Willis N. Mitchell. She was raised in Portland, and was an only child. At the age of seventeen, Mitchell was given her first role in a local theater production, joining the Baker Stock Company in Portland after graduating high school. She also performed in local vaudeville shows.

Between 1911 and 1913, Mitchell lived in Spokane and Seattle, Washington, and Vancouver, British Columbia, appearing in theatrical productions, before settling in San Francisco. In San Francisco, she was a part of the Orpheum Circuit and at the Alcazar Theater.

=== 1913–1919: Film career beginnings ===
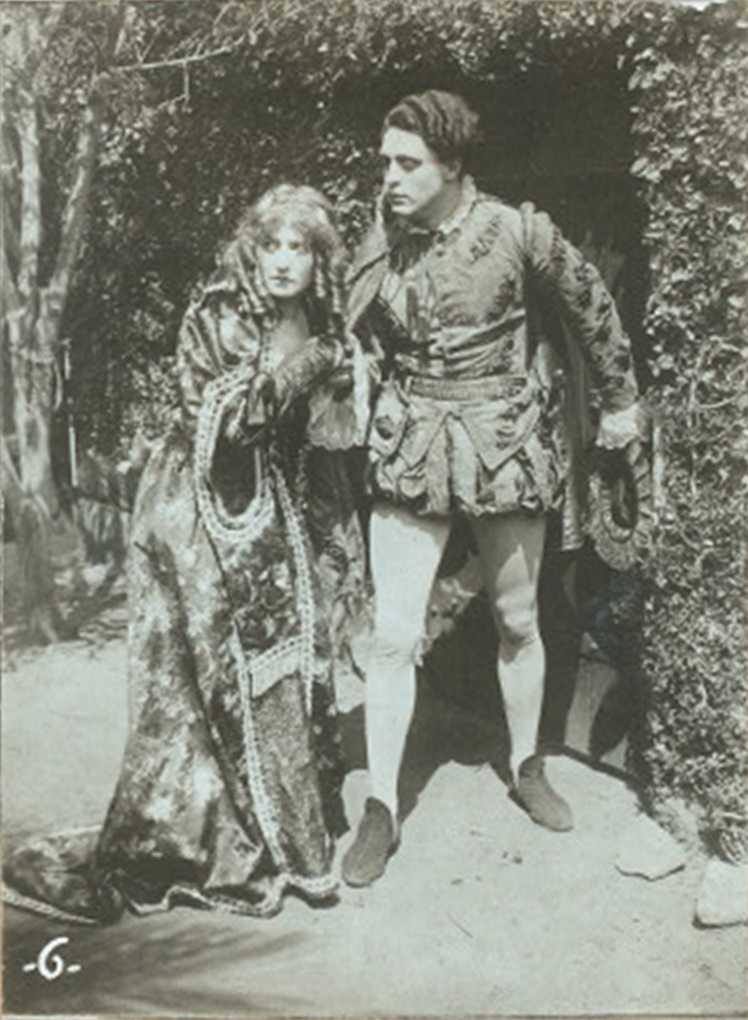
Mitchell and Chester Withey in Don Quixote (1915)

Mitchell made her film debut in 1912 with the New York Motion Picture Corporation and eventually appeared in over 100 films during her career. She starred in The Game Keeper's Daughter (1914), a romantic drama set in England. Another early credit was in The Heart of Maggie Malone (1914), in which she portrayed a miner's daughter.

She appeared a number of times with Western star William S. Hart playing a leading role in those films, including 1914's In the Sage Brush Country, and 1915's On the Night Stage directed by Reginald Barker. She also appeared in the Thomas Ince film adaptation of The Devil (also released in 1915, and directed by Barker). Mitchell had a small role in the serial film The Diamond from the Sky with Lottie Pickford, and in Edward Dillon's adaptation of Don Quixote (both released in 1915).

In 1916 she played in The Brink with Forrest Winant and Arthur Maude, in the sociological drama A Camille of the Barbary Coast (1916), and as Constance Bonacieux in Charles Swickard's The Three Musketeers.

Other notable roles include Frank Lloyd's drama The Blindness of Divorce (1918), in which she had the female starring role opposite Charles Clary.

=== 1920–1952: Later career ===
After 1917, her roles became smaller and she appeared in a handful of films through the mid-30s and in several bit parts during the early 1950s which often went uncredited. In 1936, she appeared in an uncredited part in San Francisco, starring Clark Gable, and directed by W. S. Van Dyke, who had directed Mitchell in The Hawk's Trail in 1916. In 1927, Mitchell wrote two films: The Dude Desperado and The Home Trail, the latter of which was directed by William Wyler.

She later had uncredited roles in Jacques Tourneur's The Ship That Died (1938), as a nurse in the Lana Turner-led romantic comedy Marriage Is a Private Affair (1944), and as a seamstress in The Unfinished Dance (1947). In 1948, Mitchell had a minor role as Jeny in Frank Capra's State of the Union. Her last screen credit was in director Fred Zinnemann's film adaptation of The Member of the Wedding (1952), portraying a townswoman.

== Death ==
After her retirement from films, Mitchell managed a large apartment house in Los Angeles. While managing a second apartment in 1957—the La Brea District Apartments at 3477 S. La Brea Avenue—a disgruntled houseboy named Sonnie Hartford, Jr. strangled her to death in the building with the cord of her blue silk dressing gown. Her body was found the following day, stuffed in a small dressing room in her apartment. An article in the Press-Telegram read in part:

A search still was being made by police for a 'baldish, middleaged man' who reportedly kept company recently with the never-married Miss Mitchell. Seattle police were asked to question Miss Mitchell's only known relative, an aunt, Mrs. John Benson. Police said there was no sign of a struggle or criminal attack. Her body was discovered by the houseboy. The actress, known as Ginger to her friends, had played opposite such silent film stars as William S. Hart, Tom Mix, King Baggot and Bert Lytell.... She had appeared in film bit roles as recently as 1951.

Hartford pleaded guilty to second-degree murder. In March 1958, he was given a prison sentence of five years to life.

Mitchell is interred at Hollywood Forever Cemetery in Los Angeles.
