= The Uplifters =

The Uplifters may refer to:

- The Uplifters (club), an invitation-only social club at the Los Angeles Athletic Club founded in 1913
- The Uplifters (film), a 1919 American silent film directed by Herbert Blaché
