= Alfred Hollingsworth =

American actor

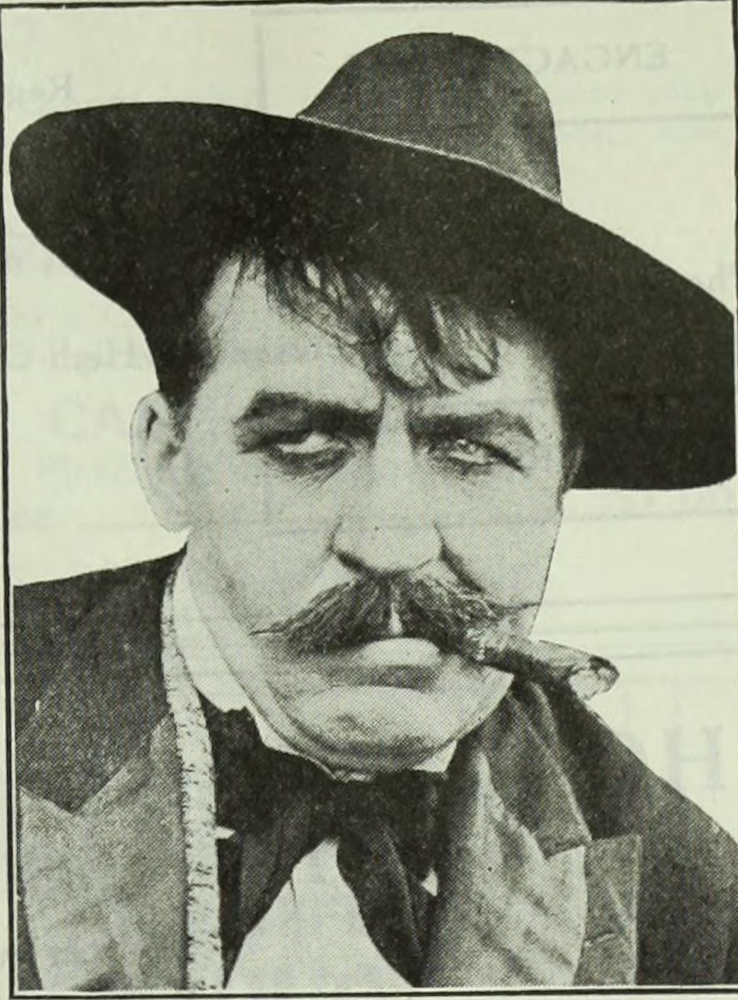
- Born: October 10, 1874; Nebraska, US
- Died: June 20, 1926 (aged 51); Glendale, California, U.S.
- Burial place: Grand View Memorial Park Cemetery
- Occupations: Actor, director, writer

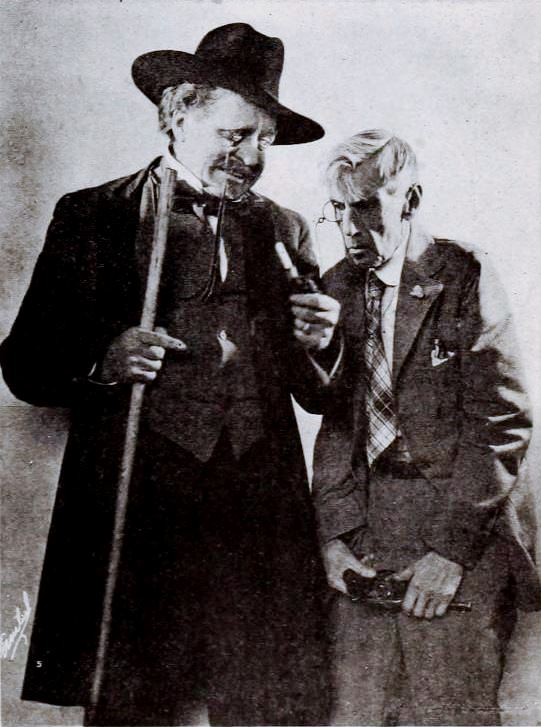
Hollingsworth (left) and Thomas Jefferson in White Youth (1920)

Alfred Hollingsworth was an American actor during the silent film era. He was in dozens of films from 1911 until 1925. He also directed four short films in 1916. Hell's Hinges has been described as a classic and Hollingsworth earned plaudits for his role in it.

In 1908, he wrote Mills of the Gods, a five act drama. He also wrote a play called Crisis in 1919. In 1922, he copyrighted Prodigal Son, a travesty in three acts.

He died at age 52 on June 20, 1926 at Windsor Hospital in Glendale, California.

== Filmography ==
=== As director ===
- The Dreamer (1916)

=== As actor ===
- Lady Godiva (1911)
- Love's Bitter Strength (1916)
- The Three Musketeers (1916)
- Hell's Hinges (1916)
- The Beggar of Cawnpore (1916)
- Purity (1916)
- The Sable Blessing (1916)
- The Right Direction (1916)
- The Gilded Youth (1917)
- The Girl and the Crisis (1917)
- Polly Ann (1917)
- The Sawdust Ring (1917)
- Fair Enough (1918)
- The Hawk's Trail (1919)
- A Man's Country (1919)
- The Uplifters (1919)
- 23 1/2 Hours' Leave (1919)
- The Joyous Liar (1919)
- Diane of the Green Van (1919)
- As the Sun Went Down (1919)
- Leave It to Susan (1919)
- White Youth (1920)
- The Leopard Woman (1920)
- The Infamous Miss Revell (1921)
- Trimmed (1922)
- The Egg (1922)
- The Bearcat (1922)
- The Phantom Fortune (1923)
- Marry in Haste (1924)
