= Tides of Passion =

Tides of Passion may refer to:

- Tides of Passion (1925 film), an American silent drama film
- Tides of Passion (1956 film), a French-Italian romantic drama film
