= Alias Miss Dodd =

1920 film directed by Harry L. Franklin

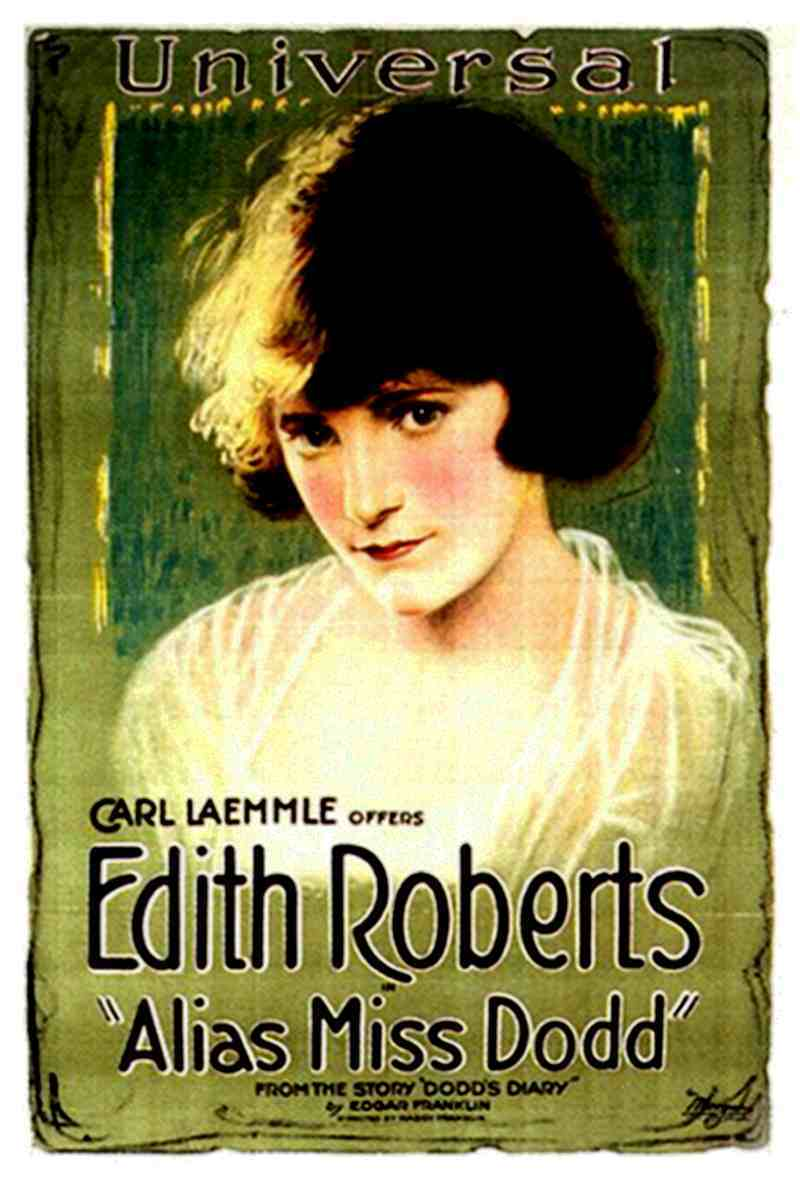
- Theatrical release poster
- Directed by: Harry L. Franklin
- Screenplay by: Charles J. Wilson
- Story by: Edgar Franklin
- Starring: Edith Roberts; Walter Richardson; John Cook; Harry von Meter; Margaret McWade; Vida Johnson
- Cinematography: Ben F. Reynolds
- Production company: Universal Film Manufacturing Company
- Distributed by: Universal Film Manufacturing Company
- Release date: June 21, 1920
- Running time: 50 minutes
- Country: United States
- Language: Silent

Alias Miss Dodd is a lost 1920 American silent comedy film directed by Harry L. Franklin and written by Charles J. Wilson. The film stars Edith Roberts, Walter Richardson, John Cook, Harry von Meter, Margaret McWade and Vida Johnson. The film was released on June 21, 1920, by Universal Film Manufacturing Company.

== Cast ==
- Edith Roberts as Jeanne
- Walter Richardson as Kent
- John Cook as Thomas Dodd
- Harry von Meter as Jerry Dodd
- Margaret McWade as Sarah Ross
- Vida Johnson as Bess
- Ruth King as Hazel Jenkins

== Preservation ==
With no holdings located in archives, Alias Miss Dodd is considered a lost film.
