= Justice of the Far North =

1925 film

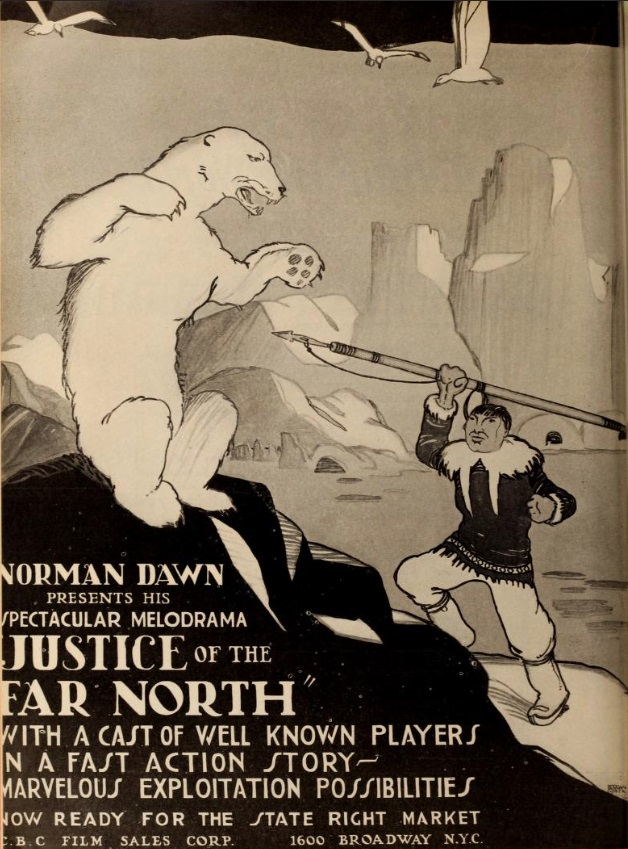
- Directed by: Norman Dawn
- Written by: Norman Dawn
- Starring: Arthur Jasmine; Marcia Manon; Laska Winter
- Cinematography: George Madden; Tony Mormann
- Production company: Columbia Pictures
- Distributed by: Columbia Pictures
- Release date: March 15, 1925
- Running time: 57 minutes
- Country: United States
- Languages: Silent; English intertitles

Justice of the Far North is a 1925 American silent adventure film directed by Norman Dawn and starring Arthur Jasmine, Marcia Manon and Laska Winter.

== Cast ==
- Arthur Jasmine as Umluk
- Marcia Manon as Wamba
- Laska Winter as Nootka
- Charles Reisner as Mike Burke
- Max Davidson as Izzy Hawkins
- George Fisher as Dr. Wells
- Katherine Dawn as Lucy Parsons
- Steve Murphy as Broken Nose McGee

== Preservation and status ==
A fragment of the film is preserved at the BFI National Film And Television Archive.
