= Nan Blair =

American screenwriter

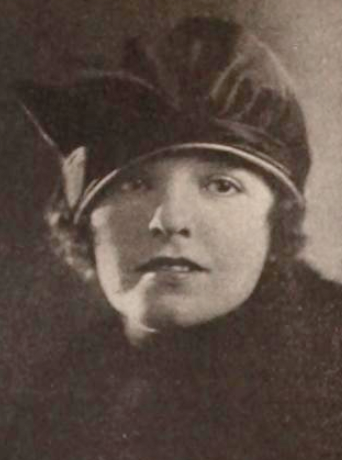
- Nan Blair, from a 1919 publication
- Born: Clyte May Cosper; September 28, 1891; Dallas, Oregon, USA
- Died: August 15, 1944 (aged 52); Los Angeles, California, USA
- Occupation: Screenwriter
- Spouses: Joseph Elizalde; Sheldon Ballinger; Benjamin Dailey

Nan Blair (September 28, 1891 – August 15, 1944), born Clyte Cosper, was an American screenwriter and literary agent active primarily during Hollywood's silent era.

== Personal life ==
Blair was born in Dallas, Oregon, to Otis Cosper and Nettie Niece. Her first husband Joseph Elizalde died in Santa Barbara in 1917, around the time she began writing screenplays in Hollywood. She later married Sheldon Ballinger; their marriage that ended in divorce. Benjamin Dailey was her third husband; they were married until her death in Los Angeles in 1944.

== Career ==
By 1918, Blair headed up the script-reading department at Triangle Pictures, where she worked on shorts like A Dream of Egypt and A Prince for a Day. She later headed Palmer Photoplays' manuscript sales department and was affiliated with Zeppo Marx Inc. Her last known credit was on This Is the Life in 1935.

== Selected filmography ==
- A Dream of Egypt (1917) (short)
- A Prince for a Day (1917) (short)
- Little Mariana's Triumph (1917) (short)
- Trail of No Return (1918) (short)
- Whom the Gods Would Destroy (1919)
- The Hawk's Trail (1919)
- The Fatal Wallop (1920)
- Beach of Dreams (1921)
- The Love Trap (1923)
- This Is the Life (1935)
