= Rose o' the River =

1919 film by Robert Thornby

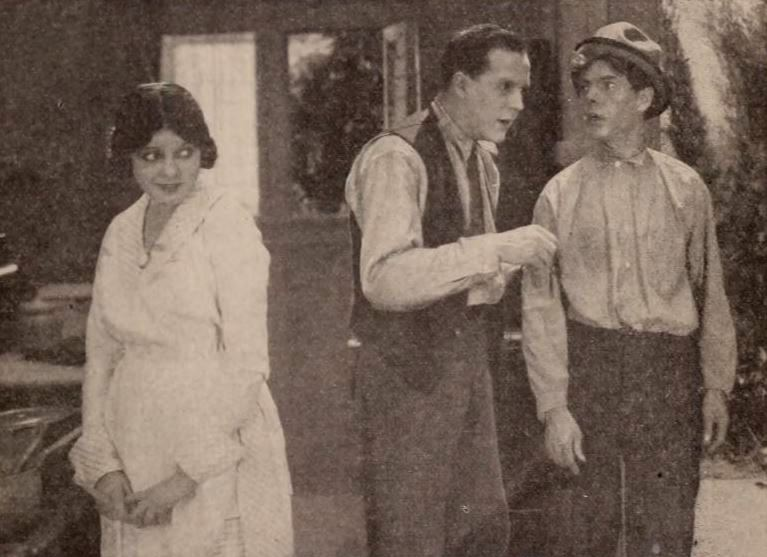
- Still from a film magazine of the final scene
- Directed by: Robert Thornby
- Screenplay by: Kate Douglas Wiggin; Will M. Ritchey
- Produced by: Jesse L. Lasky
- Starring: Lila Lee; Darrell Foss; George Fisher; Robert Brower; Josephine Crowell; Sylvia Ashton
- Cinematography: William Marshall
- Production company: Famous Players–Lasky Corporation
- Distributed by: Paramount Pictures
- Release date: July 20, 1919
- Running time: 50 minutes
- Country: United States
- Language: Silent (English intertitles)

Rose o' the River is a 1919 American drama silent film directed by Robert Thornby and written by Kate Douglas Wiggin and Will M. Ritchey. The film stars Lila Lee, Darrell Foss, George Fisher, Robert Brower, Josephine Crowell, and Sylvia Ashton. The film was released on July 20, 1919, by Paramount Pictures. It is not known whether the film currently survives.

== Plot ==
As described in a film magazine, Rose is the center of a typical circle of small town admirers, dangling them all but laying most carefully the chosen suitor Steve Waterman, foreman of the lumber gang working the forest near her home. They become engaged and he begins constructing a little home when Claude Merrill, a ribbon clerk from Boston who is pretending to be a big businessman, arrives in the community and gives ardent court. Although true to her first love, she is so impressed by her new admirer's devotion that she gives him a tender farewell, which is seen by her fiancé. Believing the worst, Steve breaks off the engagement, and Rose welcomes an opportunity to go to Boston as nurse to Steve's ailing aunt. Here she learns the clerk's true estate and returns to the country, but finds patching up the quarrel with Steve difficult. When a lumberjack makes a slurring remark about her, however, her uncle hears her former sweetheart Steve's defense of her and his declaration that he would marry her if she would let him. It is then a simple matter for her to bring about a reconciliation and precipitate the ceremony.

== Cast ==
- Lila Lee as Rose Wiley
- Darrell Foss as Steve Waterman
- George Fisher as Claude Merrill
- Robert Brower as Grandfather Wiley
- Josephine Crowell as Grandmother Wiley
- Sylvia Ashton as Mrs. Ann Brooks
- Jack Brammall as Alcestic Crambry
