= Margaret McWade =

American actress (1871-1956)

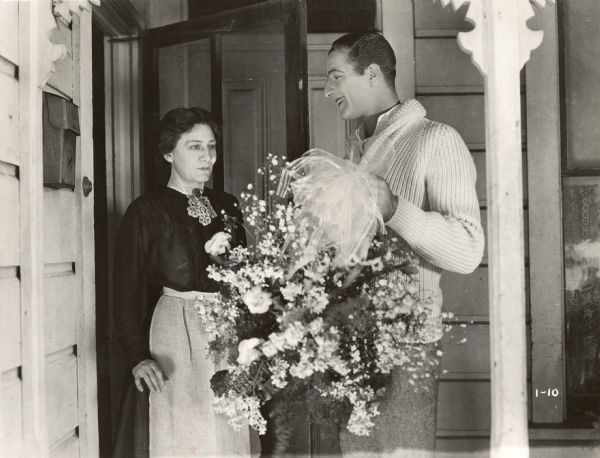
- McWade with Louis Calhern in The Blot (1921)
- Born: Margaret May Fish; September 3, 1871; Chicago, Illinois, U.S.
- Died: April 1, 1956 (aged 84); Los Angeles, California, U.S.
- Burial place: Rosehill Cemetery
- Other name: Margaret May
- Occupation: Actress
- Years active: 1892–1945
- Spouse: Edward McWade (m. 1897; died 1943)

Margaret McWade (born Margaret May Fish; September 3, 1871 – April 1, 1956) was an American stage and film actress. She began her career in vaudeville in the early 1890s. Her most memorable role was as one of the Pixilated Sisters, a comedic stage act with actress Margaret Seddon. Later in 1936, they reprised their roles in the movie Mr. Deeds Goes to Town.

== Biography ==
Margaret May Fish was born September 3, 1871, in Chicago, Illinois, the eldest of three daughters. A number of short biographies state that Fish was born in 1872; however, the 1900 U.S. Census reports her birth in 1871.

== Career ==
During her early career, Margaret May Fish went by the stage name Margaret May. In the late 1890s, while performing in vaudeville, she met fellow actress Margaret Seddon. The two actresses teamed to create a stage act known as the Pixillated Sisters. The act proved to be a hit for the duo. Years later, they reprised the Pixilated Sisters in the 1936 movie Mr. Deeds Goes to Town.

On September 4, 1897, she married actor Edward McWade. The couple had appeared in a number of stage performances together in Boston and New York City before their marriage, starting in March 1892. They were cast as supporting characters in County Fair at the Whitney Opera House. Until late 1919, Margaret continued to use her stage name Margaret May.

McWade made her screen debut in the 1914 silent film The Drama of Heyville, starring Marc McDermott and directed by Ashley Miller. She was under contract to the Edison Film Company and was later picked up by the Vitagraph Film Company. She acted in a total of 59 films from 1914 to 1954.

Between films, she was a prolific stage actress, touring the U.S. with various theatrical companies. She also toured with her husband in theater shows, several of which he wrote. In April 1901, Edward McWade wrote and produced the play Winchester at the American Theater in New York City. The play was based upon an event during the Civil War. He wrote a supporting role for his wife. In 1902, he wrote the play The Land of Mystery, a romantic drama in which Margaret also had a role.

In 1922, Margaret was cast in the movie The Blot, produced and directed by Lois Weber and considered by many critics to be Weber's greatest film. McWade played Mrs. Griggs, and she is described in reviews as the "Old Mother Hubbard, shouldering most of the burden for the penny-pinching family". The movie received critical acclaim, which paved the way for more acting roles. McWade was most often described as playing the mother, aunt, older sister, or spinster, and later in her career, the grandmother. In the Louisiana newspaper Monroe Morning World on June 5, 1938, she is described physically as "the one with the angular face and black hair".

In 1935, producers approached both McWade and Seddon and asked them to reprise their roles as the Pixilated Sisters for the 1936 movie Mr. Deeds Goes to Town, starring Gary Cooper and directed by Frank Capra. In the film, the two actresses play sisters who believe that Cooper's character is "pixilated". Reprising these characters set off a brief resurgence of stage and film performances for the duo. In The Corsicana Daily Sun, McWade is quoted regarding having played the Pixilated Sisters in the movie: "it's a one chance in a million, like something out of a book. It's not hard to understand. It wasn't we who clicked individually or even collectively. It was a grand part. If you recall, we turned the tide by our testimony in favor of Gary Cooper at an insanity hearing. He was a beloved character, and by helping him, we helped ourselves."

The two actresses teamed for a variety of films throughout the late 1930s and into the 1940s, often playing spinster sisters in comedic roles written for them, such as One Man's Bonus. After 1936, they often were billed in newspapers and posters as those "beloved Pixilated Sisters".

== Later years and death ==
Two years after performing in her last movie, Margaret McWade died on April 1, 1956, in Los Angeles at the age of 83. She was buried in her hometown of Chicago in Rosehill Cemetery.

== Stage performances ==
- 1892: The County Fair. The Whitney Opera House; Boston, MA; ** Edward McWade in production.
- 1893: Comic Stage Sketches. Boston, MA; **Edward McWade in production.
- 1901: Winchester. The American Theater, New York; Written by Edward McWade.
- 1902: The Land of Mystery. New York Theater Company; New York; Written by husband Edward McWade.
- 1912: Robert A. Hudson Theater; San Francisco, CA; New York Stage Production Company.
- 1925: The Painted Lady.The William Fox Players. Touring theatrical show. Bar Harbor Maine.

== Partial filmography ==
- The Man Who Disappeared (1914, serial) - Landlady [Ch. 4]
- Blue Jeans (1917) - Cindy Tutwiler
- To Hell with the Kaiser! (1918)
- Flower of the Dusk (1918) - Miriam
- The Great Victory (1919) - Nurse Edith Cavell
- The Broken Commandments (1919) - Mrs. Banard
- When a Man Loves (1919) - Yaki
- Stronger Than Death (1920) - Mrs. Boucicault
- The Confession (1920) - Mrs. Bartlett
- Shore Acres (1920) - Ann Berry, Martin's Wife
- Alias Miss Dodd (1920) - Sarah Ross
- Darling Mine (1920) - Agnes McCarthy
- Food for Scandal (1920) - Señora Maria Serra
- The Blue Moon (1920) - The Iron-gray Woman
- Her Beloved Villain (1920) - Madame Bergomat
- A Tale of Two Worlds (1921) - Attendant
- The Foolish Matrons (1921) - Mrs. Eugenia Sheridan
- The Blot (1921) - Mrs. Theodore Griggs
- Garments of Truth (1921) - Mrs. Crope
- Her Mad Bargain (1921) - Mrs. Dunn
- Alice Adams (1923) - Mrs. Adams
- Broken Barriers (1924) - Mrs. Durland
- The Cyclone Rider (1924) - Mrs. Armstrong
- The Painted Lady (1924) - Mrs. Smith
- Sundown (1924) - Mrs. Brent
- The Lost World (1925) - Mrs. Challenger
- White Fang (1925) - Mrs. Black
- High Steppers (1926) - Mrs. Clancy
- Women Who Dare (1928) - Mrs. Kelly
- Una nueva y gloriosa nación (1928) - Balcarce's Mother
- Manslaughter (1930) - Prison inmate (uncredited)
- The Last Days of Pompeii (1935) - Calvus' Wife (uncredited)
- Mr. Deeds Goes to Town (1936) - Amy (uncredited)
- Postal Inspector (1936) - Old Maid - Mrs. Compton (uncredited)
- Theodora Goes Wild (1936) - Aunt Elsie
- Let's Make a Million (1936) - Aunt Lucy
- Lost Horizon (1937) - Missionary (uncredited)
- We Have Our Moments (1937) - Woman in Stateroom (uncredited)
- Wings Over Honolulu (1937) - Nellie Curtis
- Love in a Bungalow (1937) - Miss Lydia Bisbee
- Danger: Love at Work (1937) - Aunt Patty
- Forbidden Valley (1938) - Mrs. Scudd
- Holiday (1938) - Farmer's Wife (scenes deleted)
- Having Wonderful Time (1938) - Mrs. G (uncredited)
- The Texans (1938) - Middle-Aged Lady (uncredited)
- Service de Luxe (1938) - Small Towner (uncredited)
- I Stole a Million (1939) - Matron (uncredited)
- When Tomorrow Comes (1939) - Woman (uncredited)
- The Hunchback of Notre Dame (1939) - Younger Sister (uncredited)
- Framed (1940) - Nosy Woman (uncredited)
- Strike Up the Band (1940) - Old Lady (scenes deleted)
- Remedy for Riches (1940) - Gertrude Purdy
- The Remarkable Andrew (1942) - Mrs. Ballard (uncredited)
- Scattergood Survives a Murder (1942) - Lydia Quentin
- The Meanest Man in the World (1943) - Lady with Umbrella (uncredited)
- I Dood It (1943) - Woman in Front Row (uncredited)
- The Man Who Dared (1946) - Mrs. Cheever (uncredited)
- It's a Joke, Son! (1947) - Jennifer Whipple
- Copacabana (1947) - Old Lady Witness (uncredited)
- The Bishop's Wife (1947) - Miss Trumbull
- It Should Happen to You (1954) - Elderly Lady at Macy's (uncredited)
