= The Adorable Savage =

1920 film directed by Norman Dawn

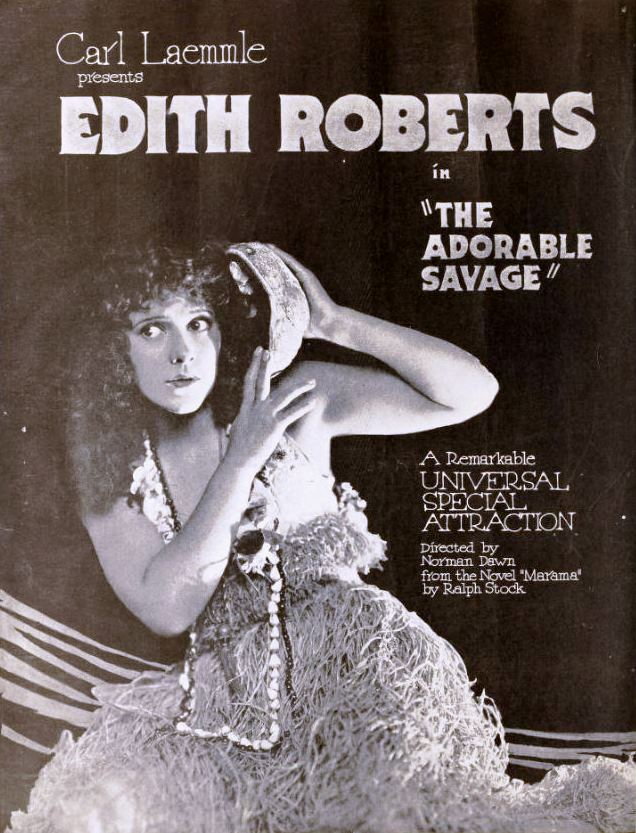
- Advertisement
- Directed by: Norman Dawn
- Screenplay by: Doris Schroeder
- Based on: Marama: A Tale of the South Pacific by Ralph Stock
- Starring: Edith Roberts; Jack Perrin; Richard Cummings; Noble Johnson; Arthur Jervis; Lucille Moulton
- Cinematography: Thomas Rea
- Production company: Universal Film Manufacturing Company
- Distributed by: Universal Film Manufacturing Company
- Release date: August 6, 1920
- Running time: 50 minutes
- Country: United States
- Language: Silent (English intertitles)

The Adorable Savage is a lost 1920 American silent adventure drama film directed by Norman Dawn and written by Doris Schroeder. It is based on the 1913 adventure novel Marama: A Tale of the South Pacific by Ralph Stock. The film stars Edith Roberts, Jack Perrin, Richard Cummings, Noble Johnson, Arthur Jervis, and Lucille Moulton. The film was released on August 6, 1920, by Universal Film Manufacturing Company.

== Plot ==
Marama Thurston leaves her fashionable boarding school in America when her ailing father Jim Thurston, a plantation owner on Fiji, begs her to protect the rubber crop from his thieving son-in-law. Upon arriving on the island, Marama learns that she is a half-caste. Traumatized, she assumes native customs and agrees to marry Ratu Madri, the island's ruler. Templeton, an American fugitive living on Fiji, falls in love with her, but Marama rejects him, having pledged herself already to the Fiji chief. As Marama dances the prenuptial rite, Templeton attempts to rescue her. The natives seize the American, and Marama threatens suicide if they harm him. The couple escape during a hurricane, and soon after a yacht arrives with the news that Templeton has been exonerated of murder charges. Their problems thus resolved, they return to America to wed.

== Cast ==
- Edith Roberts as Marama Thurston
- Jack Perrin as Templeton
- Richard Cummings as Jim Thurston
- Noble Johnson as Ratu Madri
- Arthur Jervis as Frank Maddon
- Lucille Moulton as Moala
- Lily Phillips as Akanesi

== Preservation ==
With no holdings located in archives, The Adorable Savage is considered a lost film.
