= Backbone (1923 film) =

1923 film by Edward Sloman

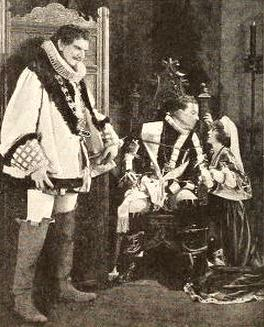
- Film still from the French episode with Alfred Lunt and Edith Roberts
- Directed by: Edward Sloman
- Written by: Clarence Budington Kelland (story); Charles E. Whittaker
- Starring: Edith Roberts; Alfred Lunt
- Cinematography: Harry Fischbeck
- Production company: Distinctive Pictures
- Distributed by: Goldwyn Pictures
- Release date: April 30, 1923
- Running time: 70 minutes; 7 reels
- Country: United States
- Language: Silent (English intertitles)

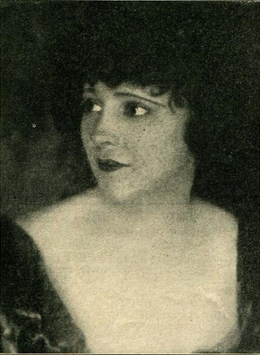
Edith Roberts in Backbone

Backbone is a 1923 American silent drama film produced by George Arliss (through his Distinctive Pictures company), released by Goldwyn Pictures and directed by Edward Sloman. Broadway actor Alfred Lunt stars in his film debut. The film has a locale in a New England lumber camp with the exception of an episode taking place in France.

== Cast ==
- Edith Roberts - Yvonne de Mersay/Yvonne de Chausson
- Alfred Lunt - John Thorne/Andre de Mersay
- William B. Mack - Anthony Bracken
- Frankie Evans - Doc Roper
- James D. Doyle - Colonel Tip
- L. Emile La Croix - Andre de Mersay
- Charles Fang - The Chinaman
- Marion Abbott - Mrs. Whidden
- Frank Hagney - The Indian
- Sam J. Ryan - Paddy
- George MacQuarrie - The Constable of France
- William Walcott - Count de Chausson
- Jack W. Johnston - Captain of the Guards (*as J.W. Johnston)
- Adolph Milar - The Mailer
- Hugh Huntley - King

== Production ==
Backbone was adapted from a popular short story of the same name written by Clarence Budington Kelland for The Saturday Evening Post.

== Preservation ==
With no prints of Backbone located in any film archives, it is considered a lost film.
