= The Hawk's Trail =

1919 film

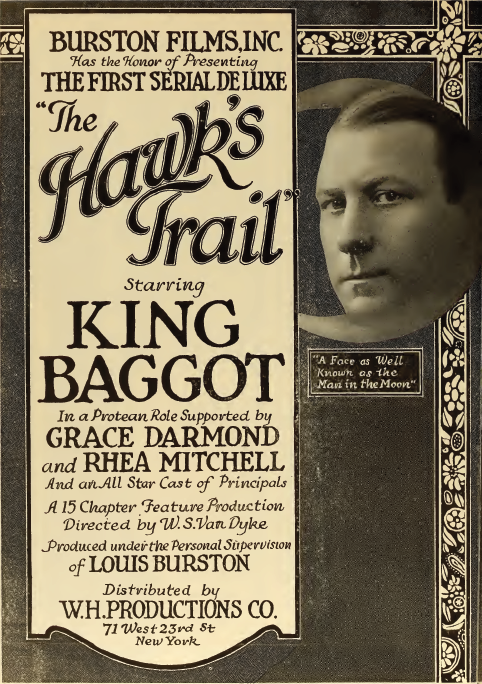
- Ad for film
- Directed by: W. S. Van Dyke
- Written by: Nan Blair; John B. Clymer
- Produced by: Louis Burston
- Starring: King Baggot; Grace Darmond
- Production company: Burston Films Inc.
- Distributed by: W.H. Productions Company
- Release date: December 13, 1919
- Running time: 15 episodes
- Country: United States
- Language: Silent (English intertitles)

The Hawk's Trail is a 1919 American crime film serial directed by W. S. Van Dyke. It is considered to be a lost film.

== Cast ==
- King Baggot as Sheldon Steele / "The Hawk"
- Grace Darmond as Claire Drake
- Rhea Mitchell as Jean Drake
- Harry Lorraine as "Iron" Dugan / Stephen Drake
- Fred Windemere as Bob Dugan
- Stanton Heck as "Bull" Cruze
- George Siegmann as Quang Goo Hai
- Alfred Hollingsworth
- Carmen Phillips as Mimi
- Nigel De Brulier
- Edna Robinson as Tina Torelli
- Carl Stockdale
- William White (credited as Billy White)
- Arthur Belasco
- Leo White

== Chapter titles ==
1. False Faces
2. The Superman
3. Yellow Shadows
4. Stained Hands
5. House of Fear
6. Room Above
7. The Bargain
8. The Phantom Melody
9. The Lure
10. The Swoop
11. One Fatal Step
12. Tides That Tell
13. Face to Face
14. The Substitute
15. The Showdown

== See also ==
- List of film serials
- List of film serials by studio
- List of lost films
