= Marry in Haste =

1924 film

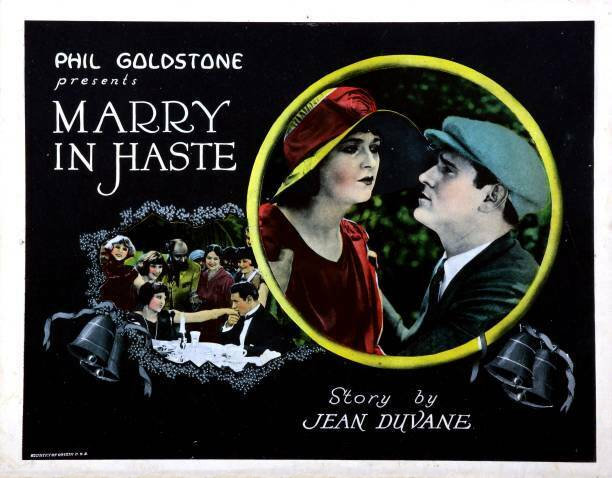
- Directed by: Duke Worne
- Written by: Jean Duvane
- Produced by: Phil Goldstone
- Starring: William Fairbanks; Dorothy Revier; Alfred Hollingsworth
- Production company: Phil Goldstone Productions
- Release date: February 1, 1924
- Running time: 50 minutes
- Country: United States
- Language: Silent (English intertitles)

Marry in Haste is a 1924 American silent comedy drama film directed by Duke Worne and starring William Fairbanks, Dorothy Revier, and Alfred Hollingsworth.

== Plot ==
As described in a film magazine review, Wayne Sturgis of Wyoming while visiting New York City meets and weds Joan Prescott, a Greenwich Village art student making a living by modeling. His wealthy father disowns him as a result of the marriage. They live on a small farm where the hard work brings disillusionment, unhappiness, and ill health to Joan. Trouble also arises due to the attentions paid to the young wife by a neighbor, Monte Brett. Wayne desperately struggles to make good and wins some much needed money by staying three rounds with a champion pugilist. Brett attempts to have sex with Joan but is repulsed by her. In the finale, the father is reconciled and forgives the young couple, who find happiness with each other.

== Cast ==
- William Fairbanks as Wayne Sturgis
- Dorothy Revier as Joan Prescott
- Alfred Hollingsworth as Manager
- Gladden James as Monte Brett
- William Dyer as Champion
- Al Kaufman as Jack Dugan
- Pat J. O'Brien in a bit part (uncredited)

== Bibliography ==
- Munden, Kenneth White. The American Film Institute Catalog of Motion Pictures Produced in the United States, Part 1. University of California Press, 1997.
