= Beach of Dreams =

1921 film

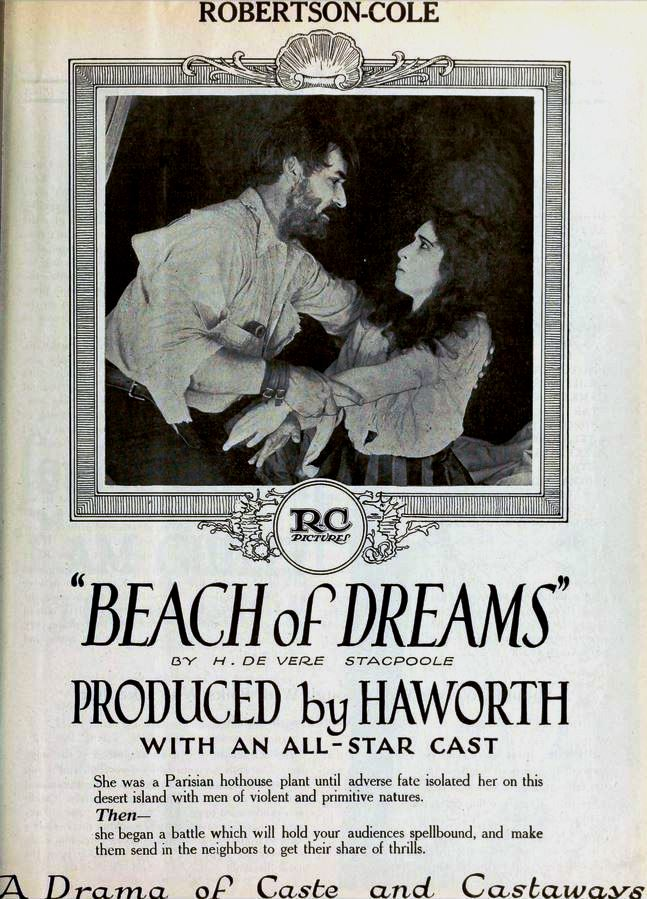
- Directed by: William Parke
- Written by: Nan Blair; Richard Schayer
- Based on: The Beach of Dreams by Henry De Vere Stacpoole
- Starring: Edith Storey; Noah Beery; Jack Curtis
- Cinematography: Ernest B. Schoedsack
- Production company: Haworth Studios
- Distributed by: Robertson-Cole Distributing Corporation
- Release date: May 8, 1921
- Running time: 50 minutes
- Country: United States
- Languages: Silent; English intertitles

Beach of Dreams is a 1921 American silent adventure film directed by William Parke and starring Edith Storey, Noah Beery and Jack Curtis. It is based on the 1919 novel The Beach of Dreams by Henry De Vere Stacpoole.

== Cast ==
- Edith Storey as Cleo de Bromsart
- Noah Beery as Jack Raft
- Sidney Payne as La Touche
- Jack Curtis as Bompard
- George Fisher as Maurice Chenet
- Josef Swickard as Monsieur de Brie
- Margarita Fischer as Madame deBrie
- Templar Powell as Prince Selm
- Gertrude Norman as La Comtesse de Warens
- Cesare Gravina as Prof. Epnard

== Bibliography ==
- St. Romain, Theresa. Margarita Fischer: A Biography of the Silent Film Star. McFarland, 2008.
- Munden, Kenneth White. The American Film Institute Catalog of Motion Pictures Produced in the United States, Part 1. University of California Press, 1997.
