= A Little Sister of Everybody =

1918 silent film by Robert Thornby

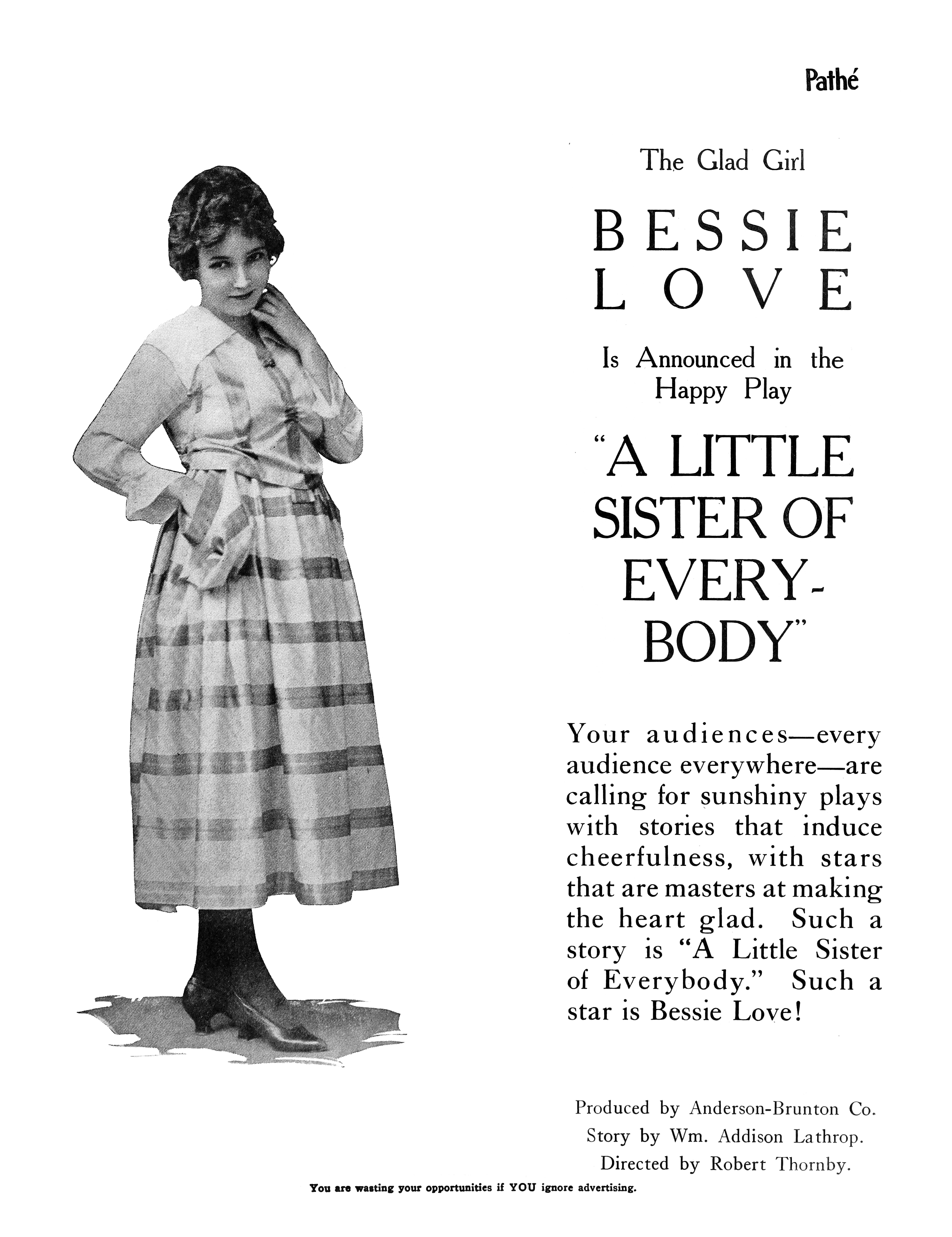
- Magazine advertisement
- Directed by: Robert Thornby
- Written by: William Addison Lathrop
- Screenplay by: Charles Sarver
- Produced by: Anderson-Brunton Photoplays
- Starring: Bessie Love; George Fisher
- Cinematography: Frank B. Good
- Production company: Anderson-Brunton Company
- Distributed by: Pathé Exchange
- Release dates: June 30, 1918 (original release); August 6, 1922 (re-release)
- Running time: 5 reels (original release); 3 reels (re-release)
- Country: United States
- Language: Silent (English intertitles)

A Little Sister of Everybody, sometimes called A Little Sister to Everybody, is a 1918 American silent comedy-drama film directed by Robert Thornby and starring Bessie Love and George Fisher. It was produced by Anderson-Brunton Company and distributed by Pathé.

The film is presumed lost.

== Plot ==
Hugh Travers Jr. is left in charge of a large manufacturing business in Manhattan's Lower East Side through the death of his father, and is confronted by considerable unrest among the employees due to the socialist doctrines preached by Ivan Marask. Disguising himself as a poor factory worker, he labors in his own mill and thus becomes interested in Nicholas Marinoff, a socialist writer, and his niece Celeste Janvier. Discharged for inciting the workers to violence, Marask determines to kill Travers. He tells Celeste of his intention, and they both arrive at the Travers home at the same time. The young woman spoils his aim, so the shot meant for Travers goes wild. Marask is astonished to discover that the man he knew as Hughes is Travers, and his astonishment is shared by Celeste. Travers tells them of his planned reforms for the employees and of his love for Celeste.

== Cast ==
- Bessie Love as Celeste Janvier
- Joseph J. Dowling as Nicholas Marinoff
- Hector Sarno as Ivan Marask
- George Fisher as Hugh Travers Jr.

== Production ==
A Little Sister of Everybody was filmed at Paralta Studio in Los Angeles.

== Release and reception ==
The film received mixed reviews.

Like many American films of the time, A Little Sister of Everybody was subject to cuts by city and state film censorship boards. For example, the Chicago Board of Censors cut, in Reel 4, the intertitle "I'll kill his dog, Hugh Travers, as a warning".

On its release, it was shown with the Toto (Armando Novello) comedy short The Furniture Movers.

== Re-release ==
In 1922, the film was edited down to 3 reels, and released as a "Pathé Playlet".
