= Edith Roberts (actress) =

American actress (1899–1935)

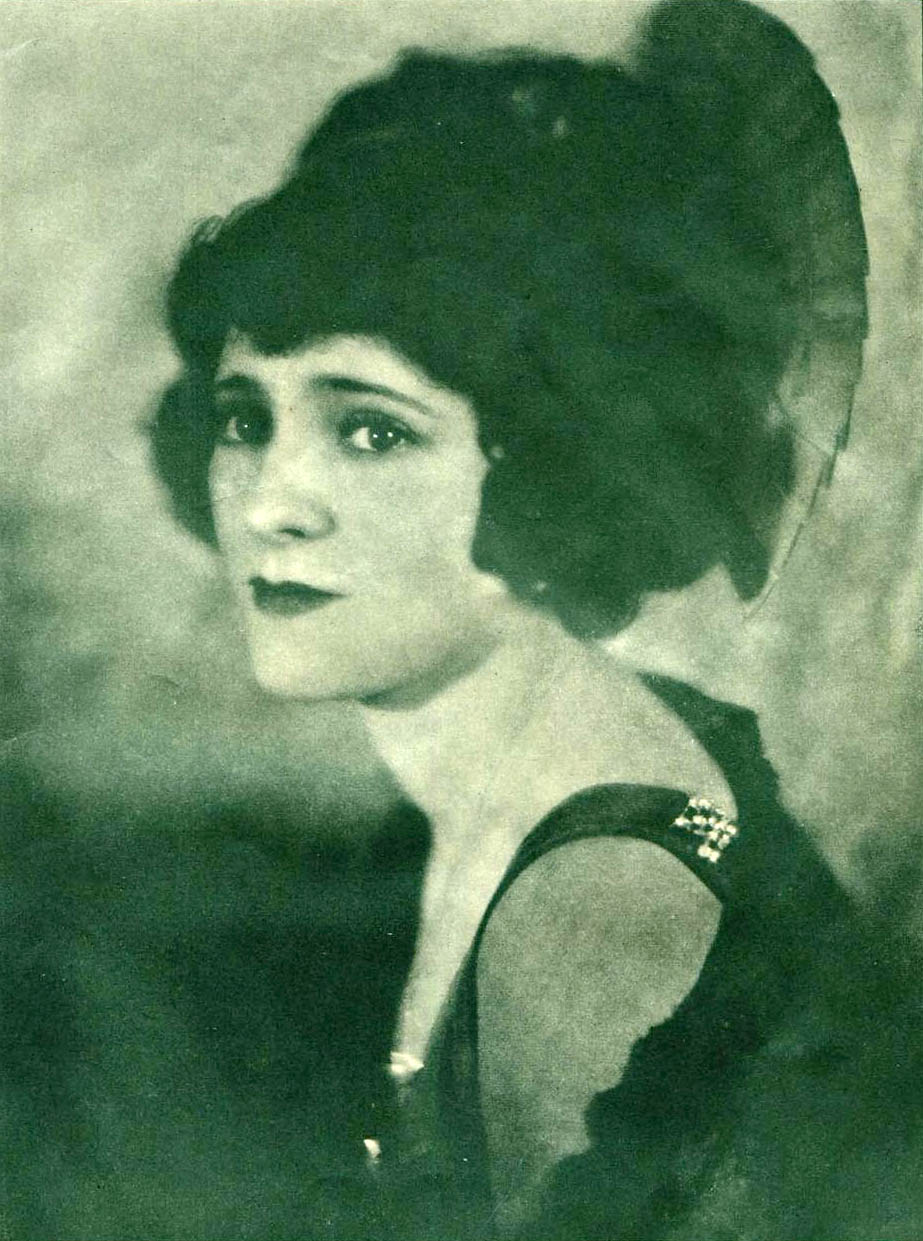
- Roberts in 1922
- Born: 1898 or 1899; New York City, U.S.
- Died: August 20, 1935, aged 36; Los Angeles, California, U.S.
- Resting place: Hollywood Forever Cemetery
- Occupations: Actress, vaudevillian
- Years active: 1915–1929
- Spouse: Harold Carter
- Children: 1

Edith Roberts (1898 or 1899 – August 20, 1935) was an American silent film actress from New York City.

== Career ==
Born in New York City, Roberts was a child actress.

Roberts performed in vaudeville before she went to Hollywood, in 1916. Among her more than 150 screen credits, are roles in Seven Keys to Baldpate (1925), Big Brother (1923), The Wagon Master (1929), The Mystery Club (1926), and Two O'Clock in the Morning (1929).

In 1927, Roberts spent four months in Australia and Fiji Islands as a co-star of a film for Australasian Film Company, Ltd. She also starred in films for Universal. In 1920, she completed work on White Youth and signed a long-term contract with Universal.

Roberts's final film appearance was in The Adorable Savage (1933).

== Personal life and death ==
Roberts was married to real estate operator Harold Carter. On August 20, 1935, she died shortly after giving birth to a son, Robert, at age 36. A Christian Science memorial service was conducted at the chapel at Hollywood Cemetery, Los Angeles, California.

== Selected filmography ==
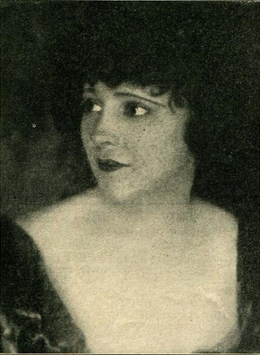
Roberts in Backbone (1923)

- When the Call Came (1915)
- Billy's College Job (1915)
- The Trail of the Wild Wolf (1916)
- Cinders (1916)
- Jilted in Jail (1917)
- The Brazen Beauty (1918)
- The Deciding Kiss (1918)
- Set Free (1918)
- Bill Henry (1919)
- Lasca (1919)
- White Youth (1920)
- Her Five-Foot Highness (1920)
- Alias Miss Dodd (1920)
- The Adorable Savage (1920)
- The Triflers (1920)
- The Fire Cat (1921)
- Thunder Island (1921)
- Opened Shutters (1921)
- The Unknown Wife (1921)
- Luring Lips (1921)
- Flesh and Blood (1922)
- Pawned (1922)
- The Son of the Wolf (1922)
- Thorns and Orange Blossoms (1922)
- A Front Page Story (1922)
- Saturday Night (1922)
- The Sunshine Trail (1923)
- Backbone (1923)
- The Dangerous Age (1923)
- Roulette (1924)
- Twenty Dollars a Week (1924)
- The Bowery Bishop (1924)
- The Age of Innocence (1924)
- Thy Name Is Woman (1924)
- Roaring Rails (1924)
- Three Keys (1925)
- Heir-Loons (1925)
- Wasted Lives (1925)
- On Thin Ice (1925)
- The New Champion (1925)
- Shattered Lives (1925)
- Seven Keys to Baldpate (1925)
- Speed Mad (1925)
- There You Are! (1926)
- The Taxi Mystery (1926)
- The Jazz Girl (1926)
- The Mystery Club (1926)
- Shameful Behavior? (1926)
- The Adorable Outcast (1928)
- Dreary House (1928)
- The Man from Headquarters (1928)
- The Phantom of the North (1929)
