= George Fisher (actor) =

American actor

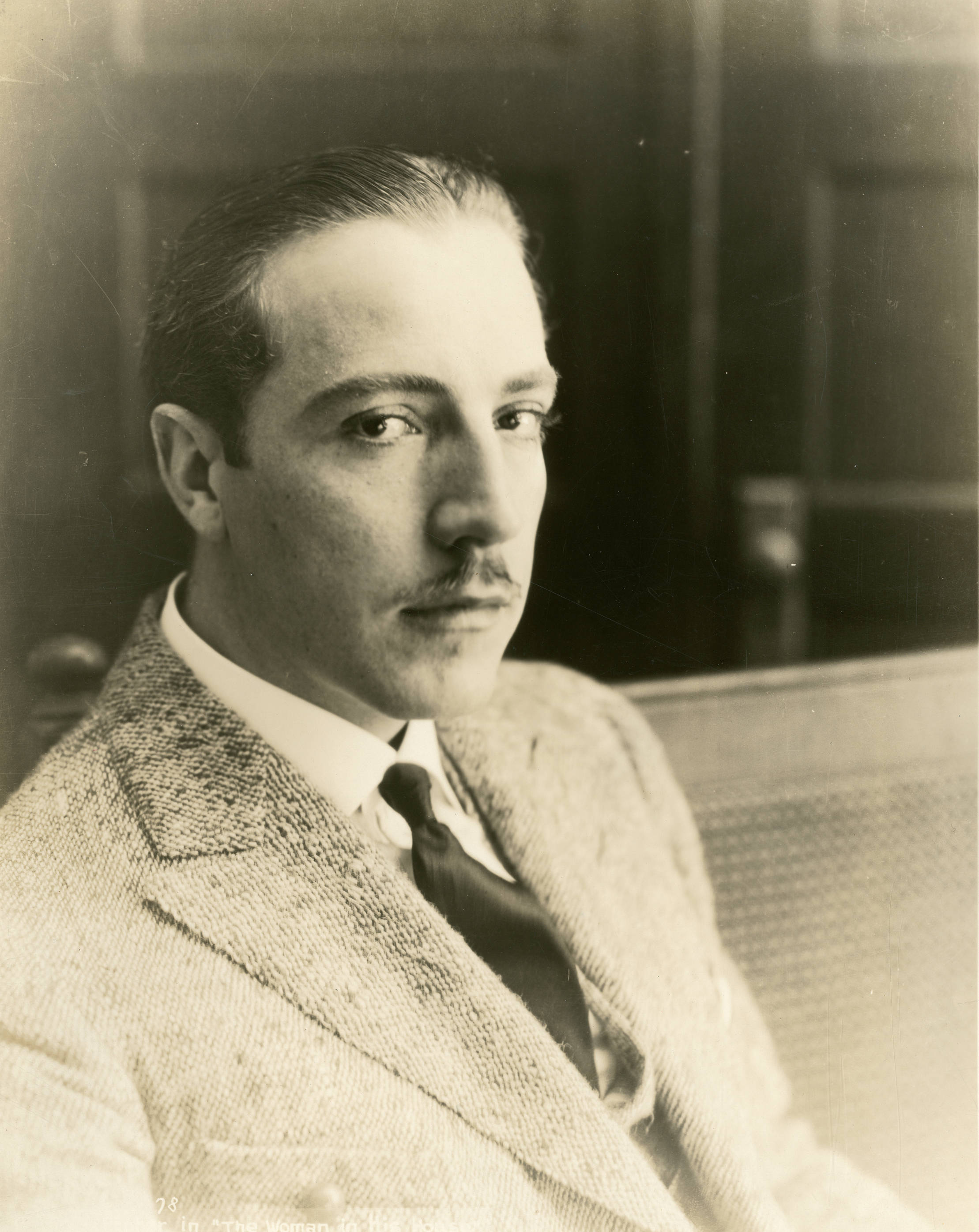
- Fisher in 1909
- Born: August 10, 1891; Republic, Michigan, US
- Died: August 13, 1960 (aged 69); Sawtelle, California, US
- Occupation: Actor
- Years active: 1911–1929

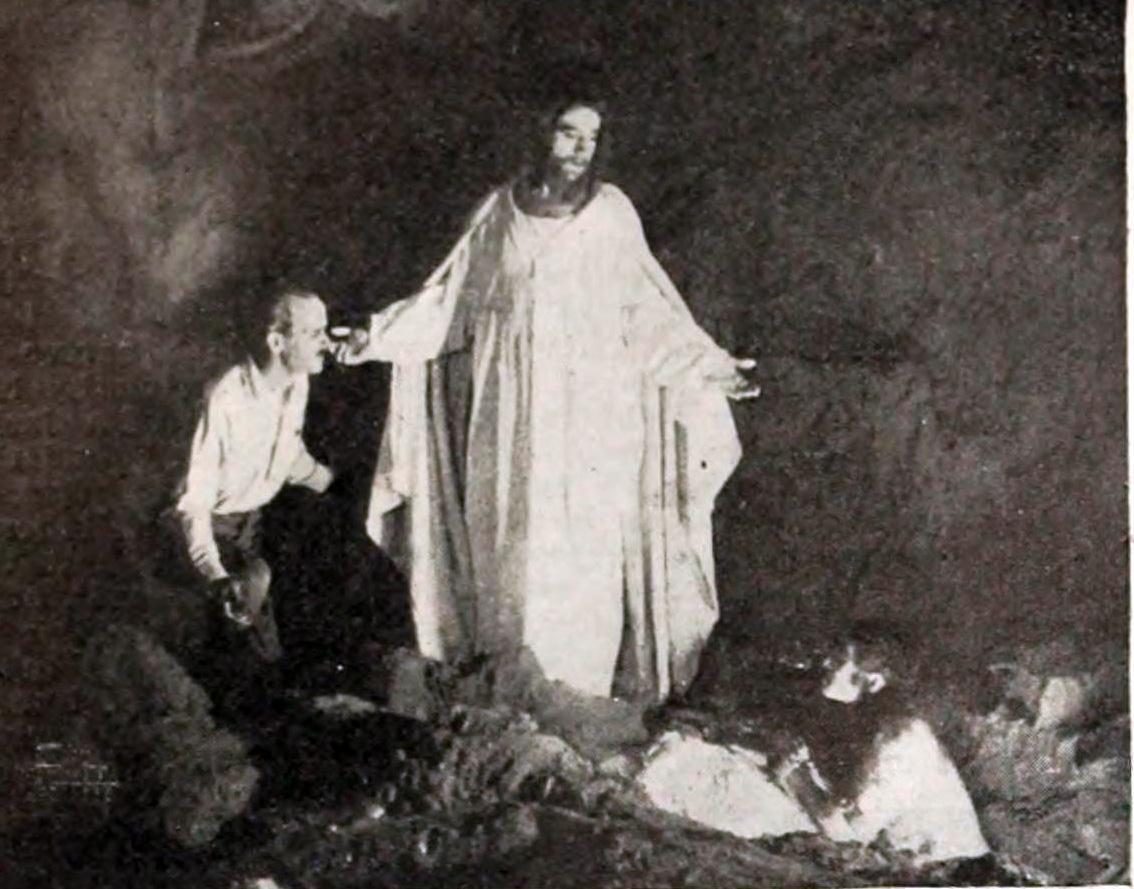
Civilization

George Fisher (August 10, 1891 – August 13, 1960) was an American film actor of the silent era. He appeared in more than 70 films between 1911 and 1929. His role in the 1916 Thomas H. Ince film Civilization is noteworthy as the first cinematic depiction of Jesus.

== Partial filmography ==
- The Battle of Gettysburg (1913)
- Rumpelstiltskin (1915) - Captain Pilkin
- The Darkening Trail (1915) - Jack Sturgess
- Civilization (1916) - The Christ
- The Three Musketeers (1916) - King Louis XIII
- Home (1916) - Allan Shelby
- Honor Thy Name (1916) - Jack Deering
- Shell 43 (1916) - Lieutenant Franz Hollen
- The Thoroughbred (1916) - Reverend Thomas Hayden
- Somewhere in France (1916) - Herr Vogel
- Three of Many (1916) - Paul Cardoza
- The Wax Model (1917) - John Ramsey
- The Promise (1917) - St. Ledger
- The Gentle Intruder (1917) - Arnold Baxter
- The Spirit of Romance (1917) - Percival Rollins
- Environment (1917) - Henry Pennfield
- Annie-for-Spite (1917) - Willard Kaine Nottingham
- Periwinkle (1917) - Richard Langdon Evans
- Pride and the Man (1917) - Warren Leonard
- The Rainbow Girl (1917) - Richard Warner
- The Sea Master (1917) - Hugh
- Alimony (1917) - Howard Turner
- Within the Cup (1918) - Le Saint Hammond
- Blue Blood (1918) - Dr. John Rand
- A Little Sister of Everybody (1918) - Hugh Travers Jr
- Maid o' the Storm (1918) - Franklin Shirley
- Fires of Youth (1918) - Ronald Standish
- Mrs. Leffingwell's Boots (1918) - Walter Huntley
- And a Still Small Voice (1918) - Richard Dunlap
- Luck and Pluck (1919) - Karl Richter
- Hearts Asleep (1919) - Randolph Lee
- Gates of Brass (1919) - Dick Wilbur
- Rose o' the River (1919) - Claude Merrill
- The Prince of Avenue A (1920) - Regie Vanderlip
- The Yellow Typhoon (1920) - M. Andre duval
- The Woman in His House (1920) - Robert Livingston
- The Devil to Pay (1920) - Larry Keeling
- The Heart of a Woman (1920) - Bob Brown
- The Land of Jazz (1920) - Captain De Dortain
- Bare Knuckles (1921) - Haines
- Colorado Pluck (1921) - Philip Meredith
- Beach of Dreams (1921) - Maurice Chenet
- Hearts of Youth (1921) - Herman Brudenell
- Moonlight Follies (1921) - Rene Smythe
- Sure Fire (1921) - Burt Rawlings
- A Parisian Scandal (1921) - Emile Carret
- Domestic Relations (1922) - Pierre
- Trail of the Axe (1922) - Jim Malkern
- Don't Shoot (1922) - Archie Craig
- Divorce (1923) - Winthrop Avery
- Excitement (1924) - Chester Robbins
- The Bowery Bishop (1924) - Philip Foster
- Justice of the Far North (1925) - Dr. Wells
- After Marriage (1925) - David Morgan
- Typhoon Love (1926) - Unknown role
- For the Term of His Natural Life (1927) - Rufus Dawe / John Rex
- Black Hills (1929) - Jack Merritt
