= After Marriage =

1925 film directed by Norman Dawn

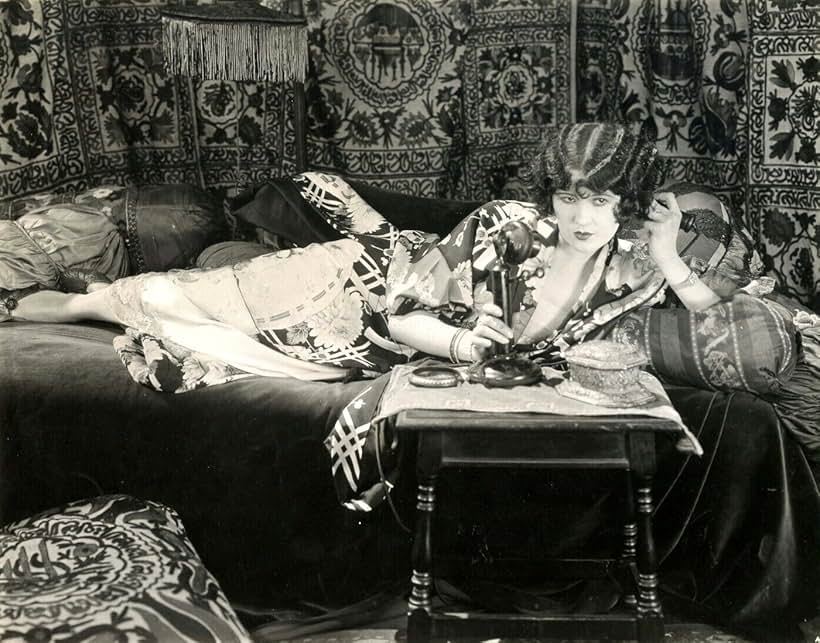
- Film still
- Directed by: Norman Dawn
- Written by: Norman Dawn
- Produced by: J.G. Mayer
- Starring: Margaret Livingston; George Fisher; Helen Lynch
- Production company: Sun Motion Pictures
- Distributed by: Madoc Sales
- Release date: September 1925
- Running time: 50 minutes
- Country: United States
- Language: Silent (English intertitles)

After Marriage is a lost 1925 American silent drama film directed by Norman Dawn and starring Margaret Livingston, George Fisher, and Helen Lynch.

== Plot ==
As described in a film magazine review, David Morgan, a young man who tires of his wife Lucille, is captivated by the actress Alma Lathrop, only to learn that his one rival for her full attention is his own father. Father and son meet on the actress’ yacht. The son leaves and, in a quarrel, the woman kills his father. She is arrested. The young man asks his wife’s forgiveness, and it is granted.

== Cast ==
- Margaret Livingston as Alma Lathrop
- George Fisher as David Morgan
- Helen Lynch as Lucille Spencer
- Herschel Mayall as James Morgan
- Annette Perry as Mrs. George Spencer
- Mary Young as Mrs. James Morgan
- Arthur Jasmine as Bob Munro

== Preservation ==
With no holdings located in archives, After Marriage is considered a lost film.

== Bibliography ==
- Connelly, Robert B. (1998). The Silents: Silent Feature Films, 1910-36. Vol. 40 (2nd ed.). December Press. ISBN 0913204366.
