= Lasca (film) =

1919 film

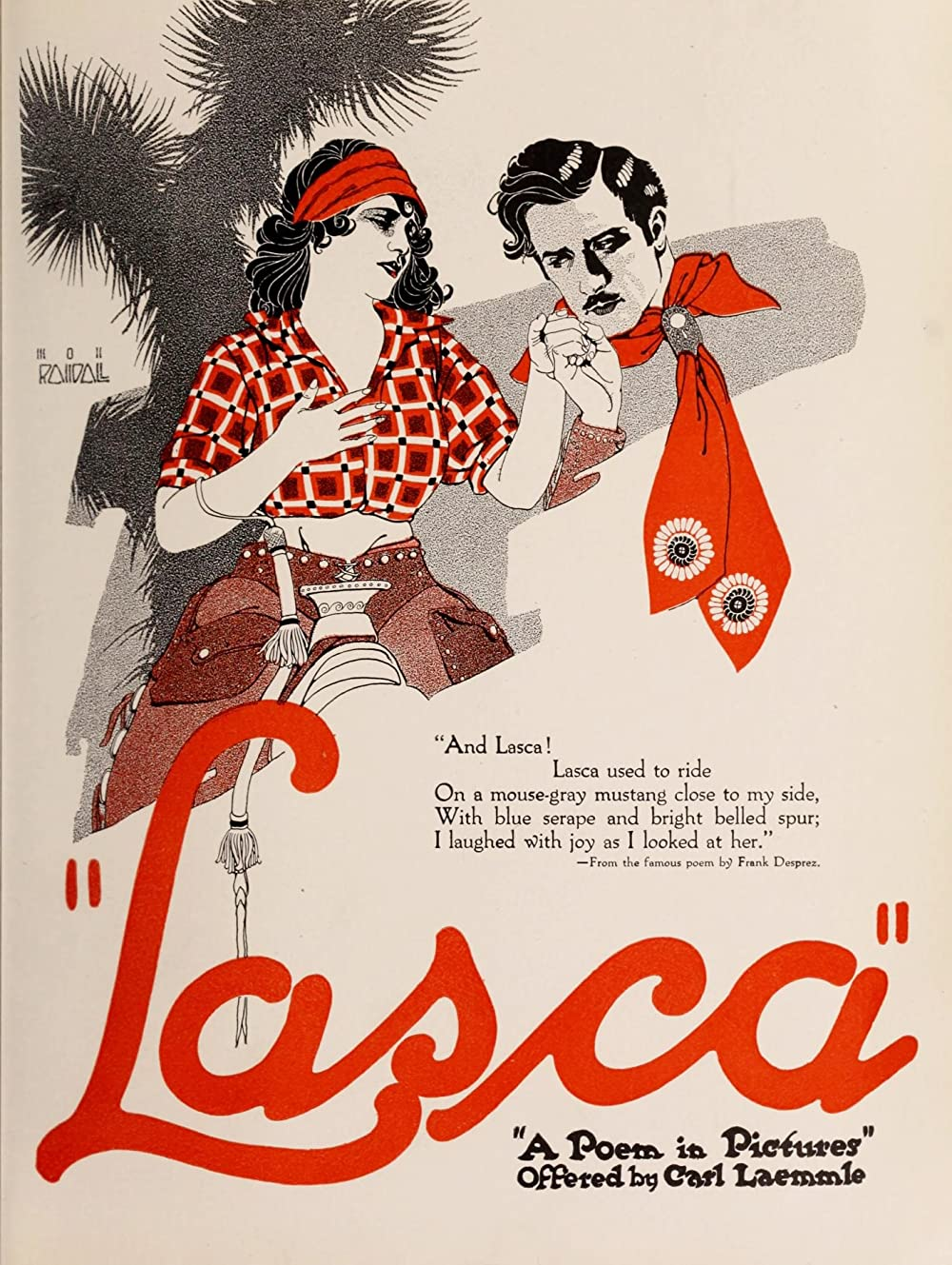
- Film poster
- Directed by: Norman Dawn
- Written by: Percy Heath; Clifford Howard
- Based on: Lasca by Frank Desprez
- Produced by: Norman Dawn
- Starring: Frank Mayo; Edith Roberts; Arthur Jasmine
- Cinematography: Thomas Rea
- Production company: Universal Pictures
- Distributed by: Universal Pictures
- Release date: December 8, 1919
- Running time: 50 minutes
- Country: United States
- Languages: Silent; English intertitles

Lasca is a 1919 American silent Western film directed by Norman Dawn and starring Frank Mayo, Edith Roberts and Arthur Jasmine. It is based on the 1882 poem Lasca by Frank Desprez.

== Cast ==
- Frank Mayo as Anthony Moreland
- Edith Roberts as Lasca
- Arthur Jasmine as Ricardo
- Veola Harty as Clara Vane
- Lloyd Whitlock as John Davis
- Raymond Lee as Boy
