= Laska Winter =

American actress

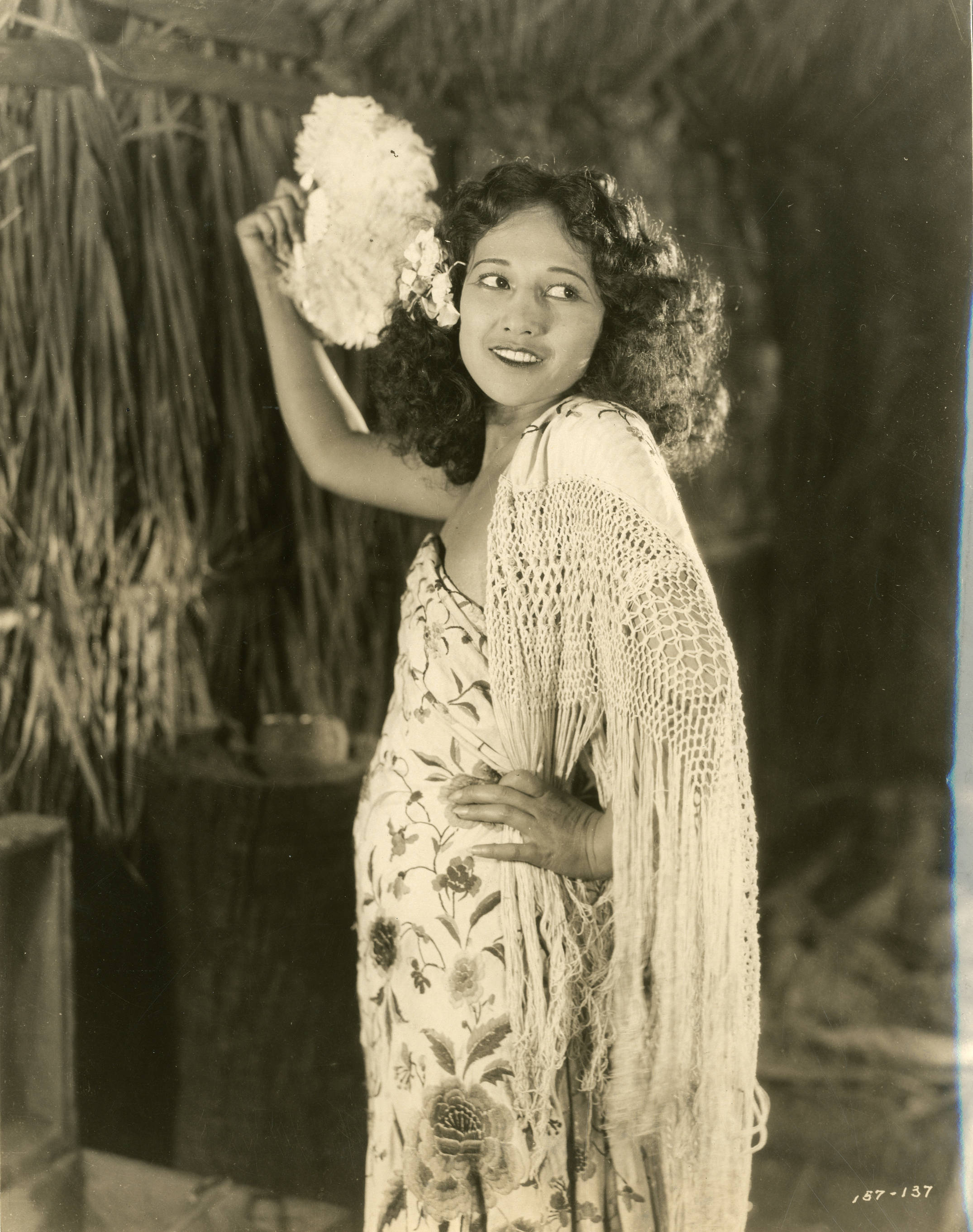
- Winter in 1924
- Born: August 28, 1905; St. Louis, Missouri, U.S.
- Died: August 8, 1980 (aged 74); South Pasadena, California, U.S.
- Other name: Winter Blossom
- Occupation: Actress
- Years active: 1921–1932 (film)
- Spouse(s): James T. O'Donohoe, 1924-1928 (his death); James Henry Hulse, ? - April 16, 1922 (his death, 1 child); Alan Weaver Hazelton, ? - August 14, 1974) (his death)

Laska Winter (August 28, 1905 – August 8, 1980) was an American film actress active during the silent and early sound era. She was also known by the stage name Winter Blossom. Although she often played exotic roles, Winter was not Asian or Pacific Islander but of mixed French, Spanish, Irish, and German descent.

== Filmography ==
- What Ho, the Cook (1921)
- The Thief of Bagdad (1924)
- The Marriage Cheat (1924)
- Justice of the Far North (1925)
- Tides of Passion (1925)
- Shipwrecked (1926)
- Rocking Moon (1926)
- The Tender Hour (1927)
- The Night of Love (1927)
- The Satin Woman (1927)
- Fashion Madness (1928)
- The Rescue (1929)
- Seven Footprints to Satan (1929)
- The Mysterious Dr. Fu Manchu (1929)
- Frozen Justice (1929)
- Chinatown After Dark (1931)
- The Rainbow Trail (1932)
- The Painted Woman (1932)

== Bibliography ==
- Munden, Kenneth White. The American Film Institute Catalog of Motion Pictures Produced in the United States, Part 1. University of California Press, 1997.
