= Arthur Jasmine =

American actor

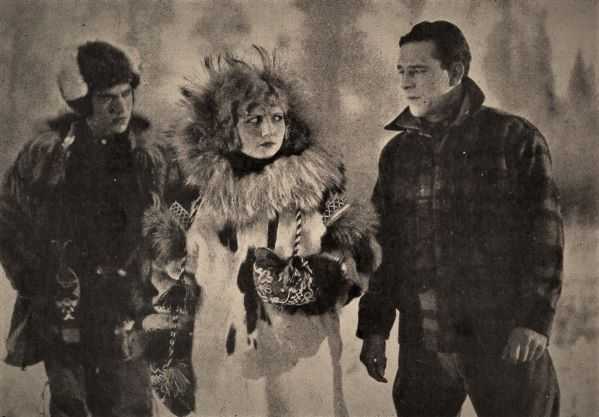
Still from Lure of the Yukon (1924) with Arthur Jasmine, Eva Novak, and Buddy Roosevelt

Arthur Jasmine (April 4, 1899 in St. Paul, Minnesota – August 19, 1954 in Los Angeles, California) was an American film actor.

== Biography ==
Jasmine began his career as a child actor at Essanay Studios in Niles, California. He appeared in 22 films between years 1915 and 1925 most notably in Alla Nazimova's Salomé (1923).

== Selected filmography ==
Features:

- The Man in the Moonlight (1919)
- Common Property (1919)
- Lasca (1919)
- A Tokyo Siren (1920)
- The Fire Cat (1921)
- Thunder Island (1921)
- The Son of the Wolf (1922)
- The Ninety and Nine (1922)
- Salomé (1923)
- Scaramouche (1923)
- Lure of the Yukon (1924)
- Justice of the Far North (1925)
- After Marriage (1925)

Short Subjects:

- Versus Sledge Hammers (1915)
- Broncho Billy's Parents (1915)
- When Snakeville Struck Oil (1915)
- The Night That Sophie Graduated (1915)
- Too Much Turkey (1915)
- It Happened in Snakeville (1915)
- A Christmas Revenge (1915)
- The Man in Him (1916)
- A Waiting Game (1916)
