= Roulette (1924 film) =

1924 film

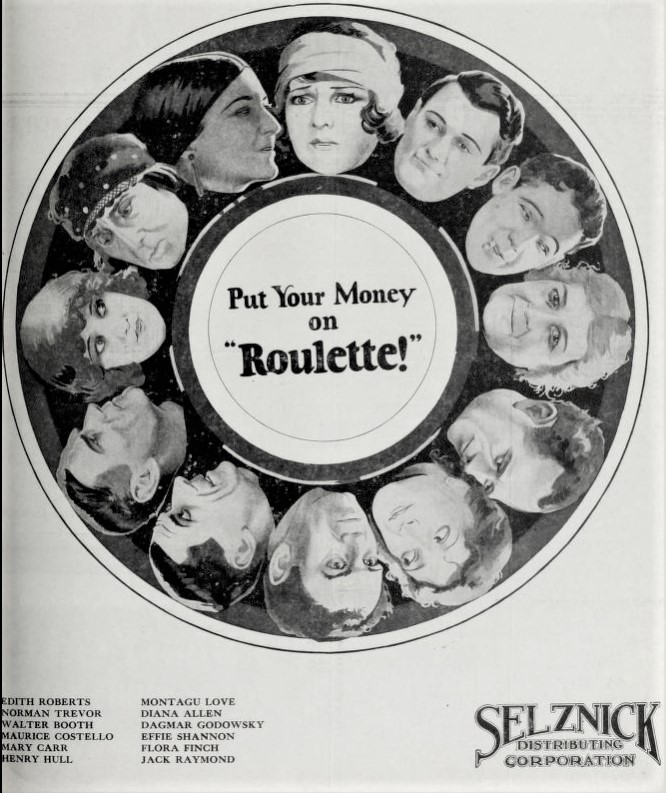
- Advertisement
- Directed by: Stanner E.V. Taylor
- Written by: Lewis Allen Browne; Gerald C. Duffy
- Story by: William MacHarg
- Produced by: David O. Selznick
- Starring: Edith Roberts; Norman Trevor; Maurice Costello
- Production company: Aetna Pictures
- Distributed by: Selznick Pictures
- Release date: January 19, 1924
- Running time: 5 reels
- Country: United States
- Language: Silent (English intertitles)

Roulette is a 1924 American silent drama film directed by Stanner E.V. Taylor and starring Edith Roberts, Norman Trevor, and Maurice Costello.

== Plot ==
As described in a film magazine review, on her father's death from shock after his partner cheats him in a card shuffle, Lois Carrington becomes the ward of gambler John Tralee. He utilizes the young woman as a decoy when playing his games. She meets and falls in love with Peter Marineaux. Peter fancies that Loris helped Tralee to cheat him. She offers herself as payment but Tralee objects as he also has designs on her. Finally, the men agree to play with the winner getting the young woman and the money. Loris controls the roulette wheel using a foot control so as to give Peter the victory. Later developments show that she made a wise choice and they are married.

== Cast ==
- Edith Roberts as Lois Carrington
- Norman Trevor as John Tralee
- Maurice Costello as Ben Corcoran
- Mary Carr as Mrs. Harris
- Walter Booth as Peter Marineaux
- Effie Shannon as Mrs. Marineaux
- Montagu Love as Dan Carrington
- Henry Hull as Jimmy Moore
- Flora Finch as Mrs. Smith-Jones
- John Raymond as Hastings
- Diana Allen as Mrs. Hastings
- Dagmar Godowsky as Rita
- Rudolf Schündler as Reginald

== Preservation ==
With no copies of Roulette located in any film archives, it is a lost film.

== Bibliography ==
- Donald W. McCaffrey and Christopher P. Jacobs. Guide to the Silent Years of American Cinema. Greenwood Publishing, 1999. ISBN 0-313-30345-2
