= Black Hills (1929 film) =

1929 film

- Directed by: Norman Dawn
- Written by: Ravenal Anderson
- Produced by: Norman Dawn
- Starring: Katherine Dawn; George Fisher; George Chandler
- Production company: Dakota Productions
- Distributed by: States Rights
- Release date: July 20, 1929
- Running time: 50 minutes
- Country: United States
- Languages: Silent; English intertitles

Black Hills is a 1929 American silent Western film directed by Norman Dawn and starring Katherine Dawn, George Fisher and George Chandler. It was shot on location in South Dakota from April 1928.

== Plot ==
Edith Budwell inherits her father's lumber business, but discovers that a series of fires are being started by a rival company with the connivance of a crooked foreman. She goes undercover posing as a Swedish cook in order to gather enough evidence to expose them.

== Cast ==
- Katherine Dawn as Edith Bidwell
- George Fisher as Jack Merritt
- Bob Webster as Dude McGee
- Aldine Webb as Lizzie McGee
- George Chandler as Soopy
- Roy Dow as Dick

== Bibliography ==
- Munden, Kenneth White (1997) [1971]. The American Film Institute Catalog of Motion Pictures Produced in the United States, Part 1. University of California Press. ISBN 0520209699.
