= The Fire Cat =

1921 film by Norman Dawn

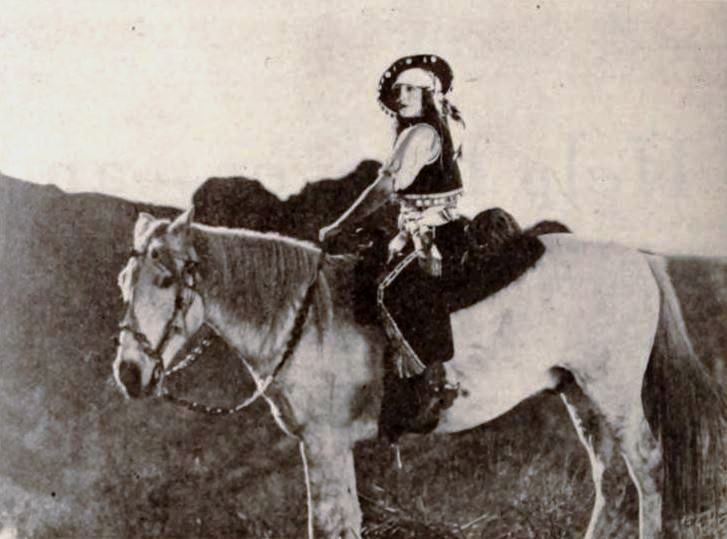
- Still with Edith Roberts riding a horse
- Directed by: Norman Dawn
- Written by: Philip D. Hurn
- Story by: Norman Dawn
- Starring: Edith Roberts; Walter Long; Eagle Eye; Olga D. Mojean; Beatrice Dominguez
- Cinematography: Thomas Rea
- Production company: Universal Film Manufacturing Company
- Distributed by: Universal Film Manufacturing Company
- Release date: February 1921
- Running time: 5 reels
- Country: United States
- Language: Silent (English intertitles)

The Fire Cat is a 1921 American silent drama film directed by Norman Dawn and starring Edith Roberts, Walter Long, Eagle Eye, Olga D. Mojean, and Beatrice Dominguez. The film was released by Universal Film Manufacturing Company in February 1921.

== Cast ==
- Edith Roberts as Dulce
- Walter Long as Gringo Burke
- Eagle Eye as Cholo Pete (credited as William Eagle Eye)
- Olga D. Mojean as Mother Alvarez
- Beatrice Dominguez as Margarita
- Arthur Jasmine as Pancho
- Wallace MacDonald as David Ross

== Preservation ==
It is unknown whether the film survives as no copies have been located, likely lost.
