= The Tender Hour =

1927 film

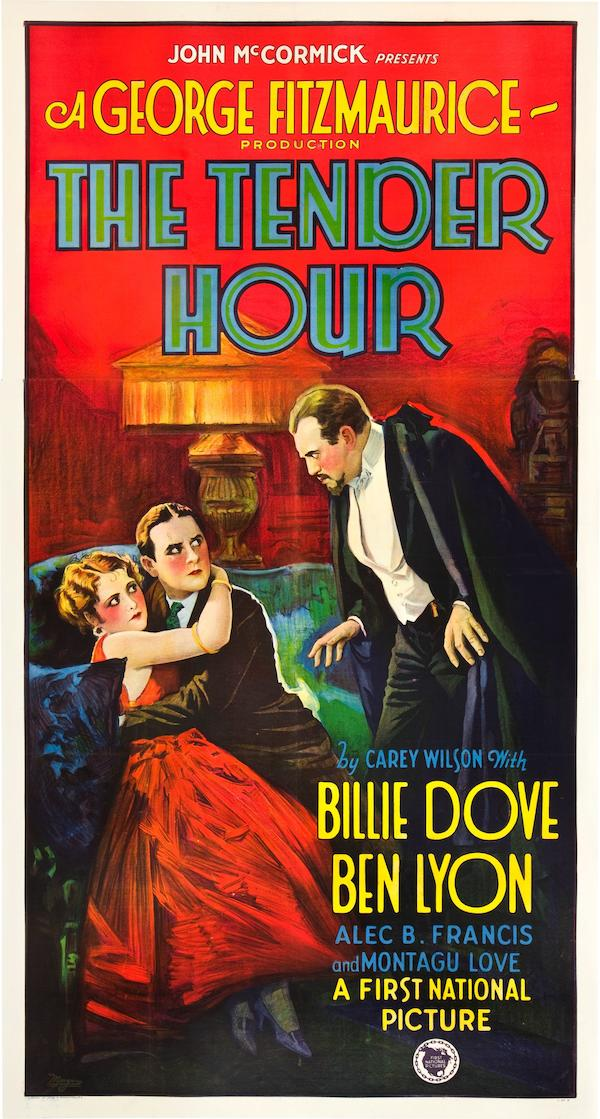
- Theatrical release poster
- Directed by: George Fitzmaurice
- Screenplay by: Winifred Dunn
- Story by: Carey Wilson
- Starring: Billie Dove; Ben Lyon; Montagu Love; Alec B. Francis; Constantine Romanoff; Laska Winter
- Cinematography: Robert Kurrle
- Production company: John McCormick Productions
- Distributed by: First National Pictures
- Release date: May 1, 1927
- Running time: 80 minutes
- Country: United States
- Language: Silent (English intertitles)

The Tender Hour is a 1927 American romantic drama film directed by George Fitzmaurice, written by Winifred Dunn, and starring Billie Dove, Ben Lyon, Montagu Love, Alec B. Francis, Constantine Romanoff, and Laska Winter. It was released on May 1, 1927, by First National Pictures.

== Cast ==
- Billie Dove as Marcia Kane
- Ben Lyon as Wally McKenzie
- Montagu Love as Grand Duke Sergei
- Alec B. Francis as Francis Chinilly
- Constantine Romanoff as Gorki
- Laska Winter as Tana
- T. Roy Barnes as Tough-House Higgins
- George Kotsonaros as The Wrestler
- Charles A. Post as Pussy-Finger
- Anders Randolf as Leader of Pageant
- Frank Elliott as Party Guest
- Lionel Belmore as Party Guest
- Lon Poff as Party Guest
- August Tollaire as Prefect of Police
- Yola d'Avril as Cabaret Girl
- George Bunny (uncredited)

== Preservation ==
- Copies are held at Filmoteca Española and UCLA Film and Television.
