= The Marriage Cheat =

1924 film

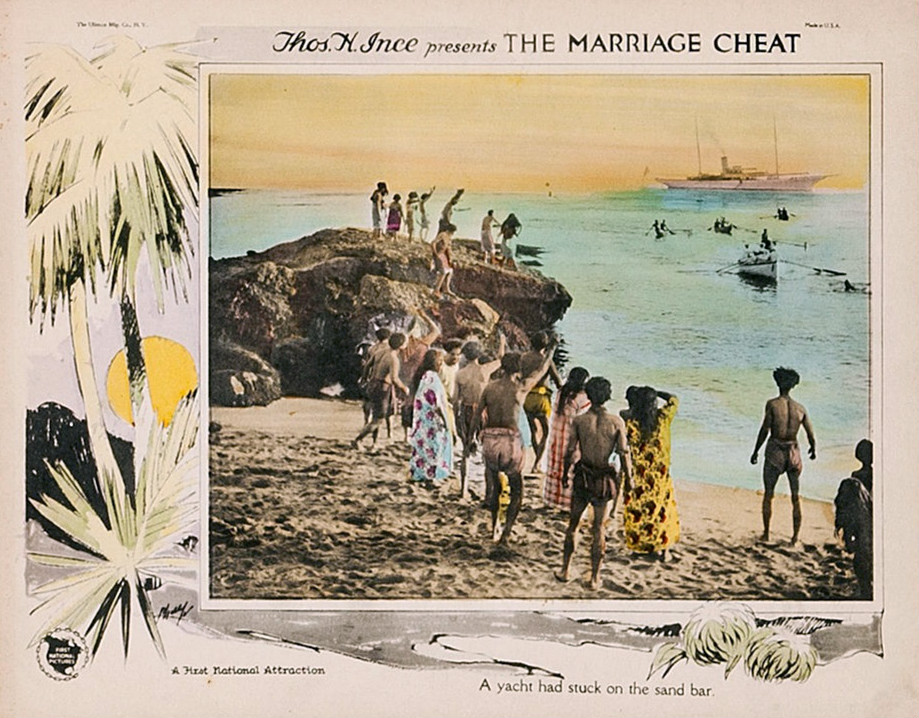
- Lobby card
- Directed by: John Griffith Wray
- Screenplay by: C. Gardner Sullivan
- Story by: Frank R. Adams
- Starring: Leatrice Joy; Adolphe Menjou; Percy Marmont; Laska Winter; Henry A. Barrows; J. P. Lockney
- Cinematography: Henry Sharp
- Production company: Thomas H. Ince Corporation
- Distributed by: First National Pictures
- Release date: April 5, 1924
- Running time: 70 minutes
- Country: United States
- Language: Silent (English intertitles)

The Marriage Cheat is a 1924 American silent drama film directed by John Griffith Wray and written by C. Gardner Sullivan. The film stars Leatrice Joy, Adolphe Menjou, Percy Marmont, Laska Winter, Henry A. Barrows, and J. P. Lockney. The film was released on April 5, 1924, by First National Pictures.

== Plot ==
As described in a film magazine review, Octavia leads an unhappy life with her dissipated husband, Bob Canfield, who is a millionaire. While cruising in the South Seas, she leaps overboard. Paul Mayne, a young missionary, finds her on an island beach. Her baby is born before her husband discovers her. In the interval she has learned to love Mayne, but yields to her marital duty's call and prepares to rejoin Canfield. In a storm the yacht is wrecked and the wretched husband drowns. Paul fights his way through the surging waves in a frail canoe and rescues the young mother and her baby. With the death of Canfield, Paul and Octavia face a happy future together.

== Cast ==
- Leatrice Joy as Helen Canfield
- Adolphe Menjou as Bob Canfield
- Percy Marmont as Paul Mayne
- Laska Winter as Rosie
- Henry A. Barrows as Yacht Captain
- J. P. Lockney as Supply Ship Captain

== Production ==
Finances and cash flow were always a concern of the independent film studios. When The Marriage Cheat was set for filming on location at Palm Springs and Palm Canyon, California, in November 1923, the Thomas H. Ince Corporation was able to borrow $200,000 from the Bank of Italy at an interest rate of 7 percent using the film negative as security.

== Preservation ==
With no copies listed for any film archives, The Marriage Cheat is a lost film.
