= Fashion Madness =

1928 film by Louis J. Gasnier

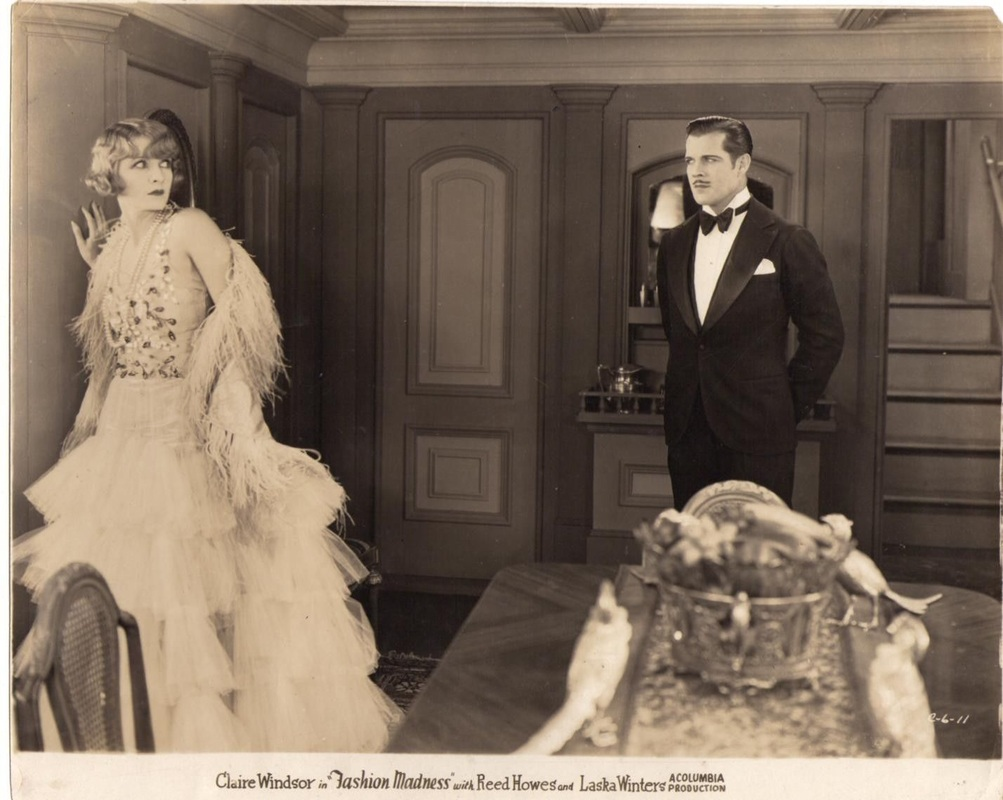
- Directed by: Louis J. Gasnier
- Written by: Victoria Moore; Olga Printzlau
- Starring: Claire Windsor; Reed Howes; Laska Winter
- Cinematography: J.O. Taylor
- Edited by: Arthur Roberts
- Production company: Columbia Pictures
- Distributed by: Columbia Pictures
- Release date: February 13, 1928
- Running time: 57 minutes
- Country: United States
- Languages: Silent; English intertitles

Fashion Madness is a lost 1928 American silent drama film directed by Louis J. Gasnier and starring Claire Windsor, Reed Howes and Laska Winter. The film was both produced and distributed by Columbia Pictures.

== Cast ==
- Claire Windsor as Gloria Vane
- Reed Howes as Victor Redding
- Laska Winter as Tanaka
- Donald McNamee as Bill
- Boris Snegoff as Count Costano

== Preservation ==
With no holdings located in archives, Fashion Madness is considered a lost film.

== Bibliography ==
- Munden, Kenneth White. The American Film Institute Catalog of Motion Pictures Produced in the United States, Part 1. University of California Press, 1997.
