= The Phantom of the North =

1929 film

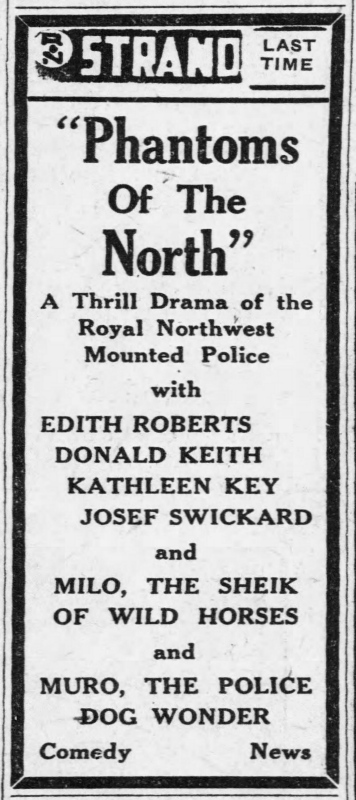
- original newspaper ad
- Directed by: Harry S. Webb
- Written by: F. E. Douglas; George C. Hull; Carl Krusada
- Starring: Edith Roberts; Donald Keith
- Cinematography: Arthur Reeves; William Thornley
- Edited by: Frederick Bain
- Release date: May 28, 1929
- Country: United States
- Languages: Silent; English intertitles

The Phantom of the North, also known as Phantoms of the North, is a 1929 American drama film directed by Harry S. Webb for the independent Biltmore Productions and featuring Boris Karloff. Although the full film is now considered lost, approximately 20 minutes is known to survive and has been released on DVD by Alpha Video under the title Phantoms of the North.

== Cast ==
- Edith Roberts as Doris Rayburn
- Donald Keith as Bob Donald
- Kathleen Key as Colette
- Boris Karloff as Jules Gregg
- Joe Bonomo as Pierre Blanc
- Josef Swickard as Colonel Rayburn
- Muro the Dog as himself
- Arab the Horse as himself

== See also ==
- Boris Karloff filmography
