= The Beach of Dreams =

1919 novel

- First edition
- Author: Henry De Vere Stacpoole
- Language: English
- Genre: Drama
- Publisher: John Lane
- Publication date: 1919
- Publication place: United Kingdom
- Media type: Print

The Beach of Dreams is a 1919 novel by the Anglo-Irish writer Henry De Vere Stacpoole. A French society woman finds herself shipwrecked on an island after going on a yachting cruise.

== Film adaptation ==
In 1921 it was adapted into an American silent film Beach of Dreams directed by William Parke and starring Edith Storey, Noah Beery and Jack Curtis.

== Bibliography ==
- Goble, Alan. The Complete Index to Literary Sources in Film. Walter de Gruyter, 1999.
