= Typhoon Love =

1926 film

- Directed by: Norman Dawn
- Written by: Norman Dawn
- Produced by: Norman Dawn
- Starring: Mitchell Lewis; Ruth Clifford; Katherine Dawn
- Production company: Norman Dawn Productions
- Distributed by: Lee-Bradford Corporation
- Release date: February 1926
- Running time: 60 minutes
- Country: United States
- Languages: Silent; English intertitles

Typhoon Love is a 1926 American silent drama film directed by Norman Dawn and starring Mitchell Lewis, Ruth Clifford and Katherine Dawn. The plot follows two adventurers working on an opal mine and a captain who schemes against them, ultimately dying and freeing his daughter to marry one of them.

== Cast ==
- Mitchell Lewis
- Ruth Clifford
- T. Roy Barnes
- George Fisher
- Katherine Dawn

== Bibliography ==
- Munden, Kenneth White (1997) [1971]. The American Film Institute Catalog of Motion Pictures Produced in the United States, Part 1. University of California Press. ISBN 0520209699.
