= Katherine Dawn =

American actress

- Born: Katherine Virginia Madden; July 25, 1896; Chelan County, Washington, US
- Died: July 13, 1984 (aged 87); Santa Monica, California, US
- Other names: Susan Denis
- Occupation(s): Actress, screenwriter, editor
- Spouse: Norman Dawn

Katherine Dawn (1896-1984) (born Katherine Virginia Madden, and sometimes credited as Susan Denis) was an American actress, screenwriter, and editor active during the 1920s through the 1940s. She was married to director Norman Dawn, whom she met when she was working as a scenarist at Universal Pictures.

== Selected filmography ==
As actress:

- Showgirl's Luck (1931)
- Black Hills (1929)
- Black Cargoes of the South Seas (1929)
- For the Term of His Natural Life (1927)
- Typhoon Love (1926)
- Justice of the Far North (1925)
- Lure of the Yukon (1924)

As screenwriter:

- Orphans of the North (1940)
- Taku (1937)

As editor:

- For the Term of His Natural Life (1927)
