= The Love Trap (1923 film) =

1923 silent drama film by John Ince

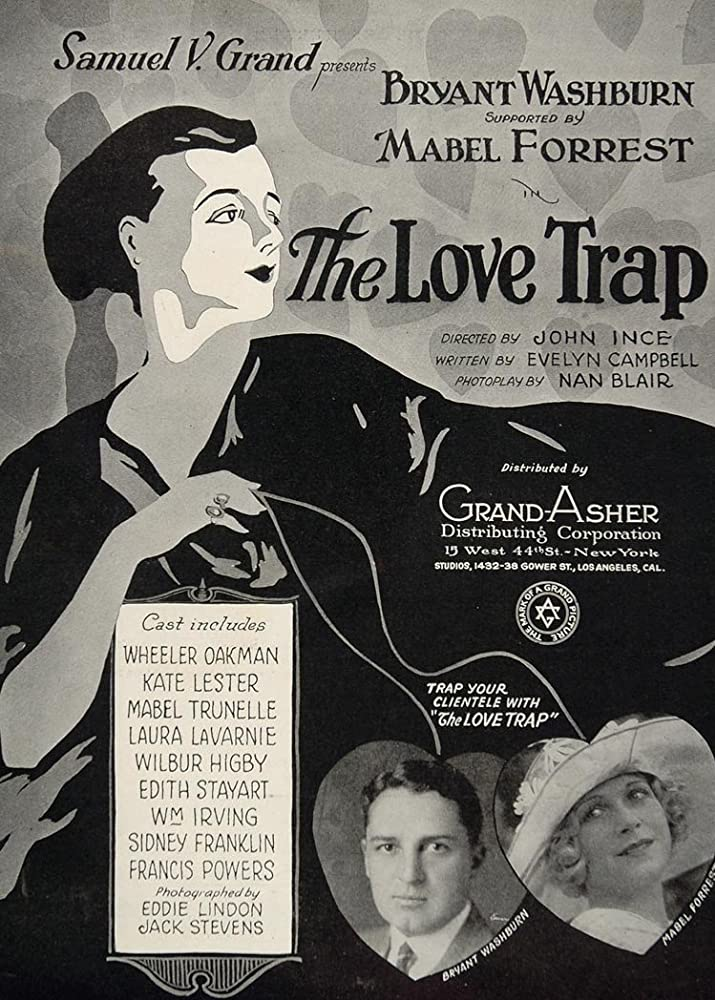
- Advertisement
- Directed by: John Ince
- Written by: Nan Blair; Evelyn Campbell
- Produced by: Ben F. Wilson
- Starring: Bryant Washburn; Mabel Forrest; Wheeler Oakman
- Cinematography: Edward Linden
- Production company: Ben Wilson Productions
- Distributed by: Grand Asher Distributing Corporation
- Release date: August 30, 1923
- Running time: 60 minutes
- Country: United States
- Languages: Silent; English intertitles
- Budget: Silent (English intertitles)

The Love Trap is a 1923 American silent drama film directed by John Ince and starring Bryant Washburn, Mabel Forrest, and Wheeler Oakman.

== Plot ==
A judge's daughter agrees to go with her fiancée to a roadhouse. However, he is murdered there by his abandoned wife and she is left facing black due to the potential scandal.

== Cast ==
- Bryant Washburn as Martin Antrim
- Mabel Forrest as Joyce Lyndon
- Wheeler Oakman as Grant Garrison
- Kate Lester as Mrs. Lyndon
- Mabel Trunnelle as Rosalie
- William Irving as Freddie Rivers
- Wilbur Higby as Detective Graves
- Francis Powers as Judge Lyndon
- Billy Lord as Beatrice
- Laura La Varnie as Mrs. Hawley
- Sidney Franklin as Mr. Hawley
- Edith Stayart as Miss Shepley (reporter)
- Betty Small as Maid

== Preservation ==
A print of The Love Trap is held by the Cinémathèque québécoise of Montreal, Canada.

== Bibliography ==
- Munden, Kenneth White. The American Film Institute Catalog of Motion Pictures Produced in the United States, Part 1. University of California Press, 1997.
