= Norman Dawn =

American film director (1884–1975)

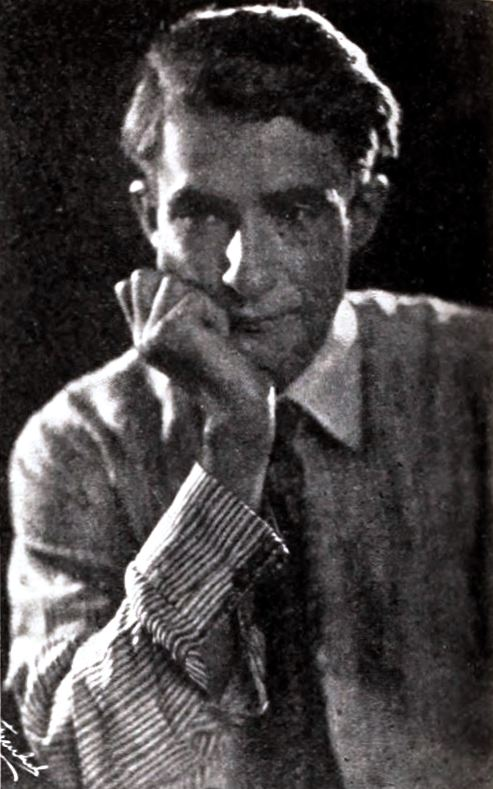
- Born: Norman O. Dawn; 25 May 1884; Argentina
- Died: 2 February 1975 (aged 90); Santa Monica, California, USA
- Occupation: Film director
- Spouse: Katherine Dawn

Norman O. Dawn (25 May 1884 – 2 February 1975) was an early American film director. He made several improvements on the matte shot to apply it to motion picture, and was the first director to use rear projection in film production.

== Dawn's innovations in glass and matte shots ==
Dawn's first film Missions of California made extensive use of the glass shot, in which certain parts of the intended image are painted on a piece of glass and placed in between the camera and the live action. Many of the buildings which Dawn was filming were at least partially destroyed; by painting sections of roof or walls, the impression was made that the buildings were in fact, still whole. The main difference between the glass shot and the matte shot is that with a glass shot, all filming is done with a single exposure of film.

Dawn combined his experience with the glass shot with the techniques of the matte shot. Up until this time, the matte shot was essentially a double-exposure: a section of the camera's field would be blocked with a piece of cardboard to block the exposure, the film would be rewound, and the blocked part would also be shot in live action. Dawn instead used pieces of glass with sections painted black (which was more effective at absorbing light than cardboard), and transferred the film to a second, stationary camera rather than merely rewinding the film. The matte painting was then drawn to exactly match the proportion and perspective to the live action shot. The low cost and high quality of Dawn's matte shot made it the mainstay in special effects cinema throughout the century.

Dawn patented his invention on 11 June 1918 and sued for infringement of the patent three years later. The co-defendants, matte artists who included Ferdinand Pinney Earle and Walter Percy Day, counter-sued, claiming that the technique of masking images and double exposure had long been traditional in the industry, a legal battle which Dawn ultimately lost.

== Australia ==
Dawn worked in Australia for a number of years, directing a big-budget adaptation of the Marcus Clarke classic novel For the Term of His Natural Life in 1927 and a musical, Showgirl's Luck in 1931, which was the first talking sound film in Australia.

== Partial filmography ==
This list includes some additional films not mentioned at IMDB.

- Missions of California (1907)
- Gypsy Love (1910)
- Women of Toba (1910)
- Story of the Andes (1911)
- Ghost of Thunder Mountain (1912)
- Man of the West (1912)
- The Drifter (1913)
- Oriental Love (1916)
- The Girl in the Dark (1917)
- The Kaiser, the Beast of Berlin (1917)
- Danger, Go Slow (1918)
- Lasca (1919)
- A Tokyo Siren (1920)
- The Adorable Savage (1920)
- White Youth (1920)
- Thunder Island (1921)
- The Fire Cat (1921)
- Wolves of the North (1921)
- Five Days to Live (1922)
- The Son of the Wolf (1922)
- The Vermilion Pencil (1922)
- Lure of the Yukon (1924)
- After Marriage (1925)
- Justice of the Far North (1925)
- Typhoon Love (1926)
- For the Term of His Natural Life (1927)
- The Adorable Outcast (1928)
- Black Hills (1929)
- Showgirl's Luck (1931)
- Tundra (1936)
- Call of the Yukon (1938)
- Arctic Fury (1949)
- Two Lost Worlds (1951)
- Wild Women (1951)

There is a Norman O. Dawn collection in the Ransom Collection of the University of Texas, Austin.

According to the book Special Effects: The History and Technique (RICKITT, Richard Ed. Watson-Guptill Publications, [s.l], 2000), page 190, Norman O. Dawn was born in a Bolivian railroad camp in Bolivia, not Argentina.
