= White Youth =

1920 film directed by Norman Dawn

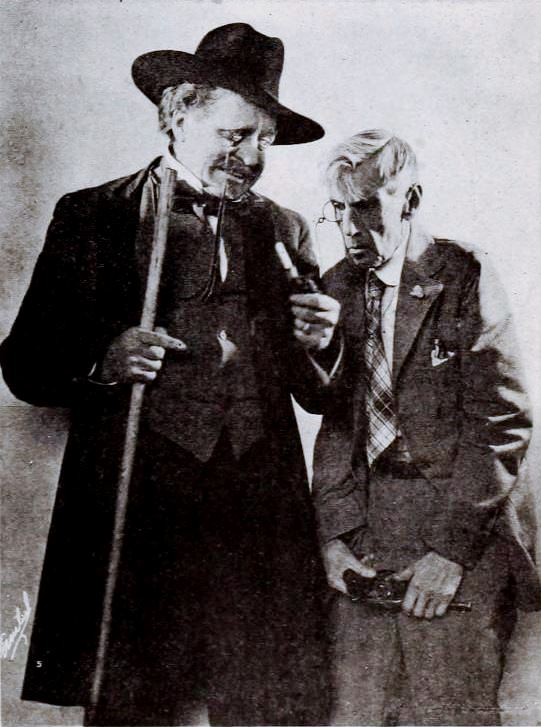
- Still with Hollingsworth and Jefferson
- Directed by: Norman Dawn
- Written by: George C. Hull
- Story by: Clara Beranger; Forrest Halsey
- Starring: Edith Roberts; Alfred Hollingsworth; Thomas Jefferson; Arnold Gray Hattie Peters
- Cinematography: Thomas Rea
- Production company: Universal Film Manufacturing Company
- Distributed by: Universal Film Manufacturing Company
- Release date: December 1920
- Running time: 5 reels
- Country: United States
- Language: Silent (English intertitles)

White Youth is a 1920 American silent drama film directed by Norman Dawn and starring Edith Roberts, Alfred Hollingsworth, Thomas Jefferson, Arnold Gray, and Hattie Peters. The film was released by Universal Film Manufacturing Company in December 1920.

== Cast ==
- Edith Roberts as Aline Ann Belame
- Alfred Hollingsworth as Gen. Belame
- Thomas Jefferson as Frangois Cayetane
- Arnold Gray as Burton Striker (as Arnold Gregg)
- Hattie Peters as Calalou
- Lucas C. Luke as Butler
- Joseph Belmont as Monsieur Le Moyne (as Baldy Belmont)
- Phyllis Allen as Madame Le Moyne
- Olga D. Mojean as Madame La Roche
- Sam Konnella as Pierre
- Alida B. Jones as Madame Martin (as Alida D. Jones)
- Gertrude Pedlar as Mother Superior

== Preservation ==
With no prints of White Youth located in any film archives, it is considered a lost film.
