= Thunder Island (1921 film) =

1921 film

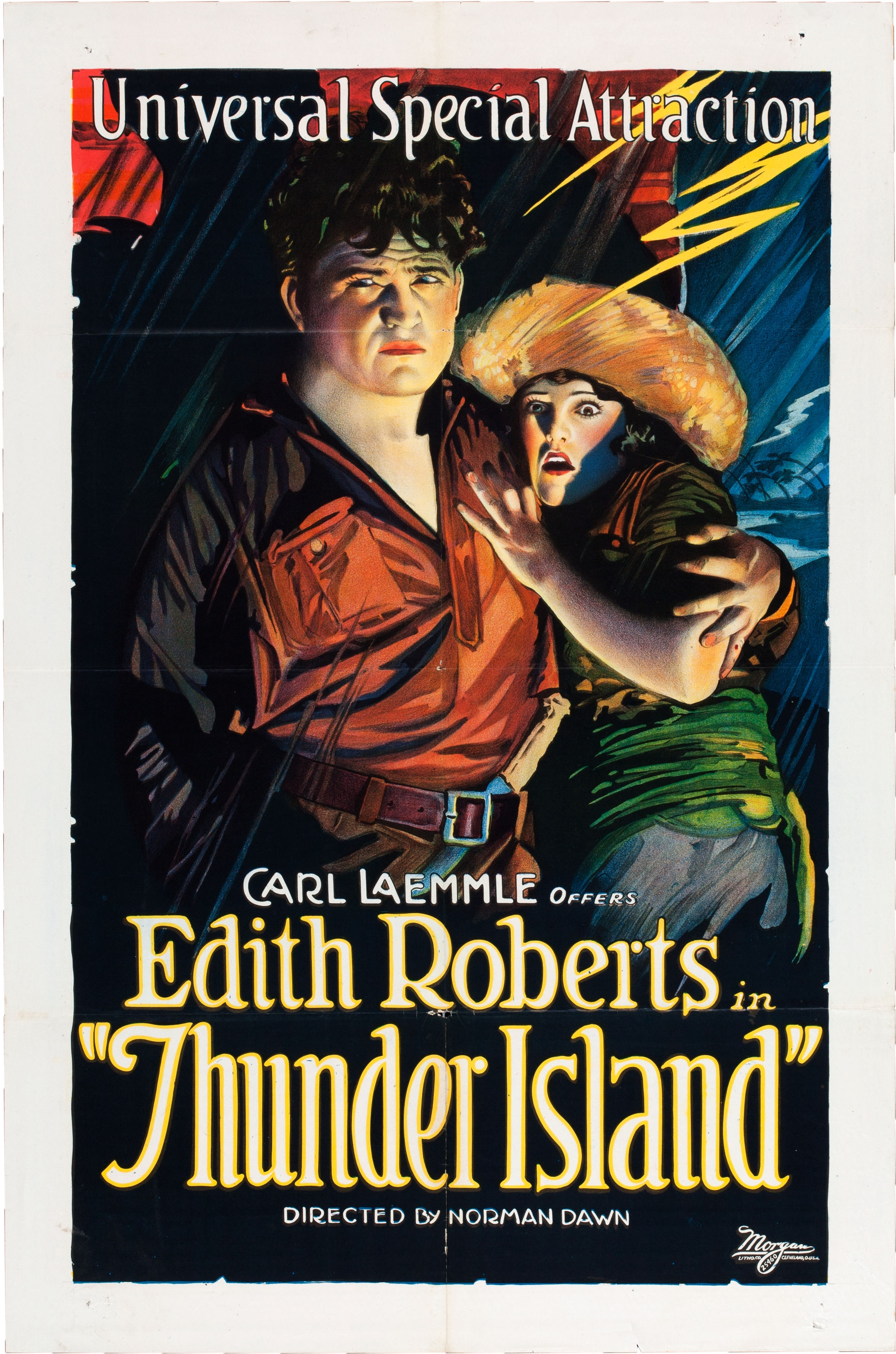
- Directed by: Norman Dawn
- Written by: Wallace Clifton
- Produced by: Carl Laemmle
- Starring: Edith Roberts; John B. O'Brien; Arthur Jasmine
- Cinematography: Thomas Rea
- Production company: Universal Pictures
- Distributed by: Universal Pictures
- Release date: June 1921
- Running time: 50 minutes
- Country: United States
- Languages: Silent; English intertitles

Thunder Island is a lost 1921 American silent adventure film directed by Norman Dawn and starring Edith Roberts, John B. O'Brien and Arthur Jasmine.

== Cast ==
- Edith Roberts as Isola Garcia / Juan Garcia
- Fred DeSilva as Pia Mendoza
- John B. O'Brien as Paul Corbin
- Arthur Jasmine as Sanchez the Loco
- Fred Kohler as Barney the Mate

== Preservation ==
With no holdings located in archives, Thunder Island is considered a lost film.

== Bibliography ==
- Connelly, Robert B. (1998). The Silents: Silent Feature Films, 1910-36. Vol. 40 (2nd ed.). December Press. ISBN 0913204366.
