= Lure of the Yukon =

1924 film

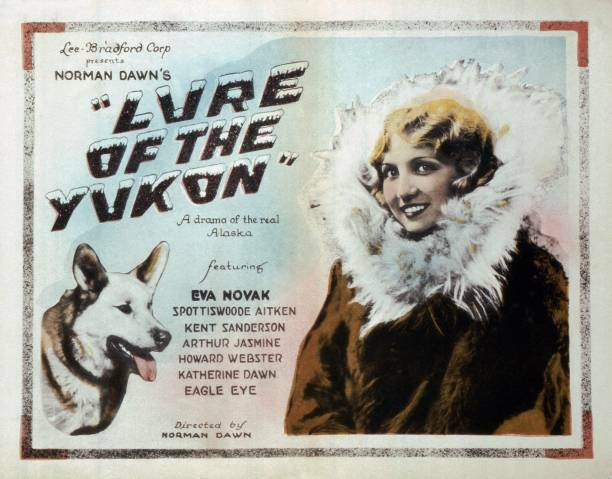
- Lobby card
- Directed by: Norman Dawn
- Written by: Norman Dawn
- Produced by: Norman Dawn
- Starring: Eva Novak; Spottiswoode Aitken; Buddy Roosevelt
- Cinematography: George Madden
- Production company: Norman Dawn Alaskan Company
- Distributed by: Lee-Bradford Corporation
- Release date: August 1, 1924
- Running time: 65 minutes
- Country: United States
- Language: Silent (English intertitles)

Lure of the Yukon is a 1924 American silent Western film, also classified as a Northern film. It is directed by Norman Dawn and stars Eva Novak, Spottiswoode Aitken, and Buddy Roosevelt. It is set in Alaska during the Klondike Gold Rush of the 1890s, and was filmed on location in the Territory.

== Cast ==
- Eva Novak as Sue McGraig
- Spottiswoode Aitken as Sourdough McCraig
- Buddy Roosevelt as Bob Force (credited as Kent Sanderson)
- Arthur Jasmine as Kuyak
- Howard Webster as Dan Baird
- Katherine Dawn as Ruth Baird
- Eagle Eye as Black Otter

== Bibliography ==
- Connelly, Robert B. (1998). The Silents: Silent Feature Films, 1910-36. Vol. 40 (2nd ed.). December Press. ISBN 0913204366.
