= Wasted Lives =

1925 film

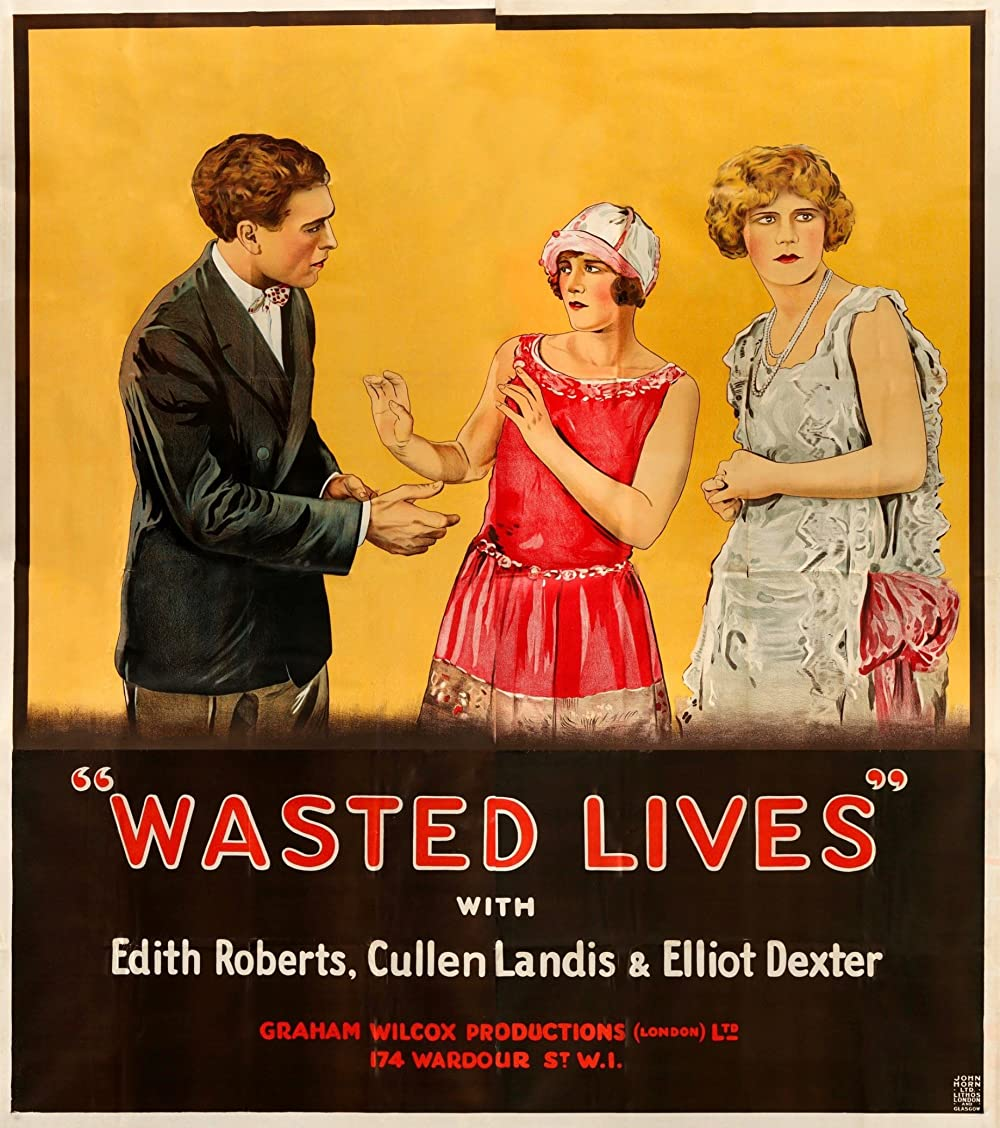
- British release poster
- Directed by: John Gorman
- Written by: Van A. James; Maude P. Kelso
- Produced by: Samuel J. Briskin; George H. Davis
- Starring: Elliott Dexter; Cullen Landis; Edith Roberts
- Production company: Banner Productions
- Distributed by: Henry Ginsberg Distributing Company; Graham-Wilcox Productions (UK)
- Release date: April 7, 1925
- Running time: 60 minutes
- Country: United States
- Languages: Silent; English intertitles

Wasted Lives is a 1925 American silent drama film directed by John Gorman and starring Elliott Dexter, Cullen Landis and Edith Roberts.

== Cast ==
- Elliott Dexter as Clayton Gray
- Cullen Landis as John Grayson
- Edith Roberts as Mary 'Tommy' Townsend
- Betty Francisco as Grace Gardner
- Henry Hull
- Hayford Hobbs
- Phillips Smalley

== Bibliography ==
- Munden, Kenneth White. The American Film Institute Catalog of Motion Pictures Produced in the United States, Part 1. University of California Press, 1997.
