= Thomas Jefferson (actor) =

American silent film actor (1856–1932)

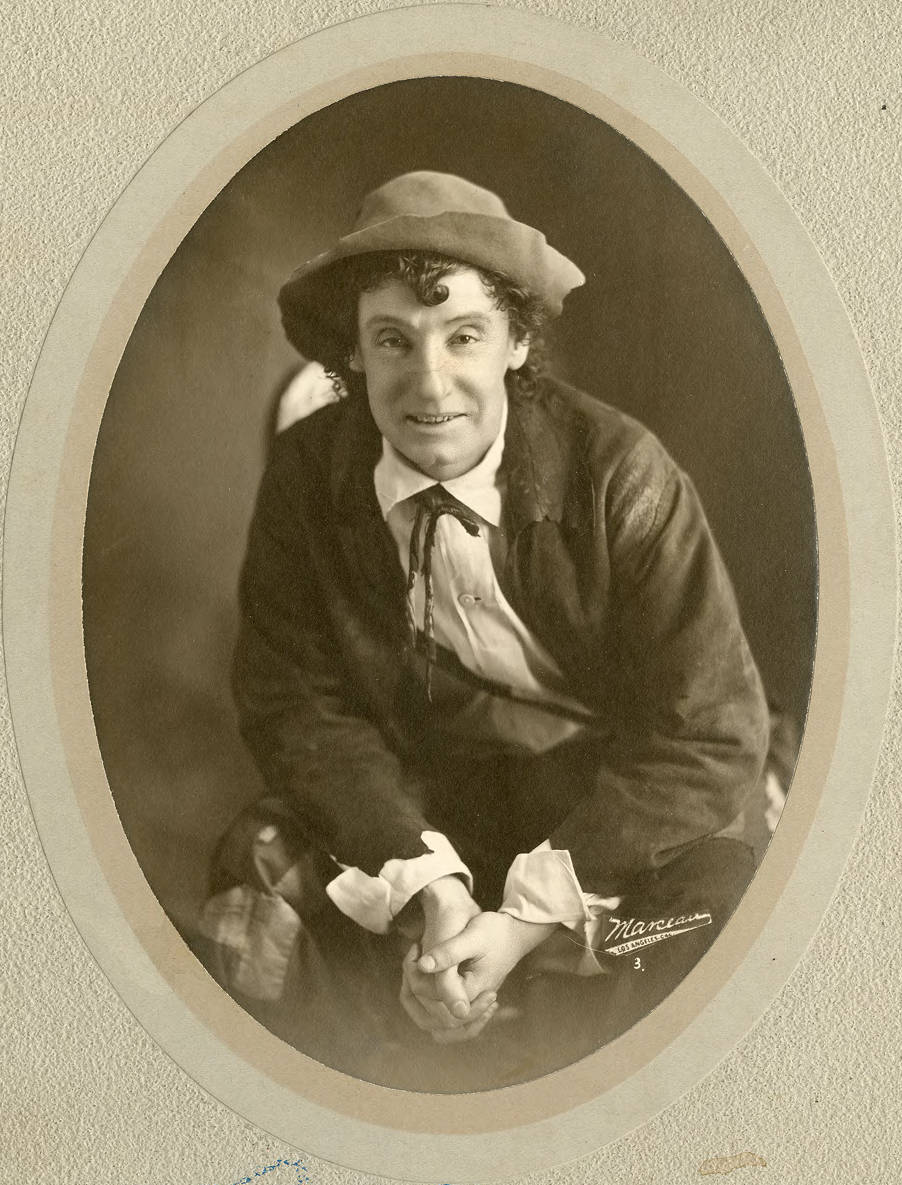
- Jefferson in 1902
- Born: Thomas Lockyer Jefferson; September 10, 1856; New York City, U.S.
- Died: April 2, 1932 (aged 75); Hollywood, Los Angeles, California, U.S.
- Occupation: Actor
- Years active: 1911–1932
- Spouse: Daisy Jefferson

Thomas Lockyer Jefferson (September 10, 1856 – April 2, 1932) was an American film and stage actor in mostly silent films.

== Biography ==
He was born to Margaret Clements Lockyer (died 1861) and actor Joseph Jefferson. The Burns Mantle Yearbook reported that he was sixth in a line of famous Jeffersons. He had leading roles in several films including The Grim Game (1919) with Harry Houdini. He also starred in two film adaptations of Rip Van Winkle as the title character, a role his father had performed on stage.

He toured the U.S. performing a starring role in the play Lightnin'. He married actress Daisy Jefferson and had three daughters from an earlier marriage.

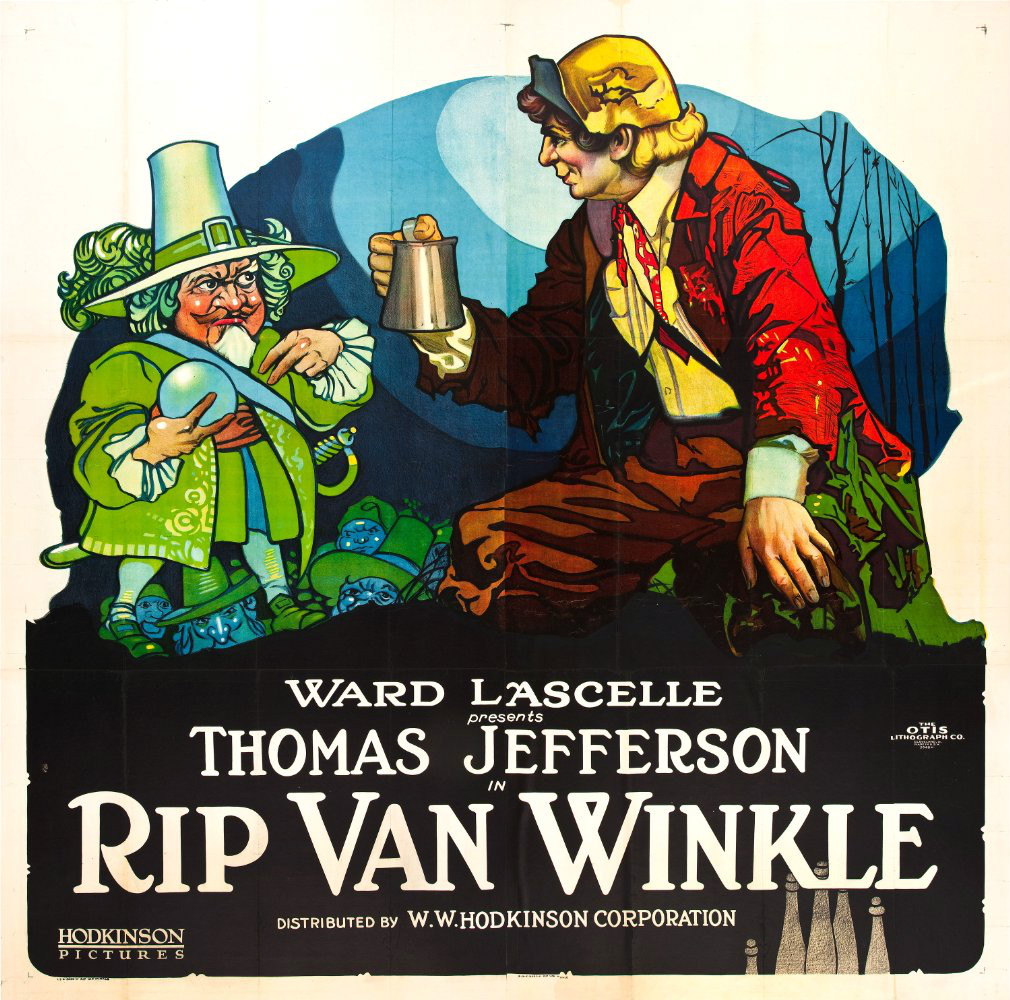
Lobby poster for Rip Van Winkle (1921)

== Selected filmography ==
- The Sable Lorcha (1915)
- Only a Tramp (1915)
- Under the Gaslight (1914)
- The Seats of the Mighty (1914)
- Rip Van Winkle (1914)
- Classmates (1914)
- No Place for Father (1913)
- Olaf—An Atom (1913)
- Up from the Depths (1915)
- The Mainspring (1916)
- Little Eve Edgarton (1916)
- The Missing Links (1916)
- An Old-Fashioned Young Man (1917)
- Polly Put the Kettle On (1917)
- A Hoosier Romance (1918)
- The Grim Game (1919)
- The Other Half (1919)
- The Spender (1919)
- Her Kingdom of Dreams (1919)
- Married in Haste (1919)
- Hearts Are Trumps (1920)
- White Youth (1920)
- The Little Grey Mouse (1920)
- A Splendid Hazard (1920)
- Help Wanted - Male (1920)
- The Girl in the Web (1920)
- The Idle Rich (1921)
- Rip Van Winkle (1921)
- My Lady's Latchkey (1921)
- Straight from Paris (1921)
- Beauty's Worth (1922)
- The Son of the Wolf (1922)
- Zander the Great (1925) (*uncredited)
- The Thoroughbred (1925)
- Paid to Love (1927)
- Soft Living (1928)
- On with the Show! (1929)
- Just Like Heaven (1930)
- Ten Nights in a Bar-Room (1931)
- Forbidden (1932)
- The Hatchet Man (1932)
