= Tides of Passion (1925 film) =

1925 film

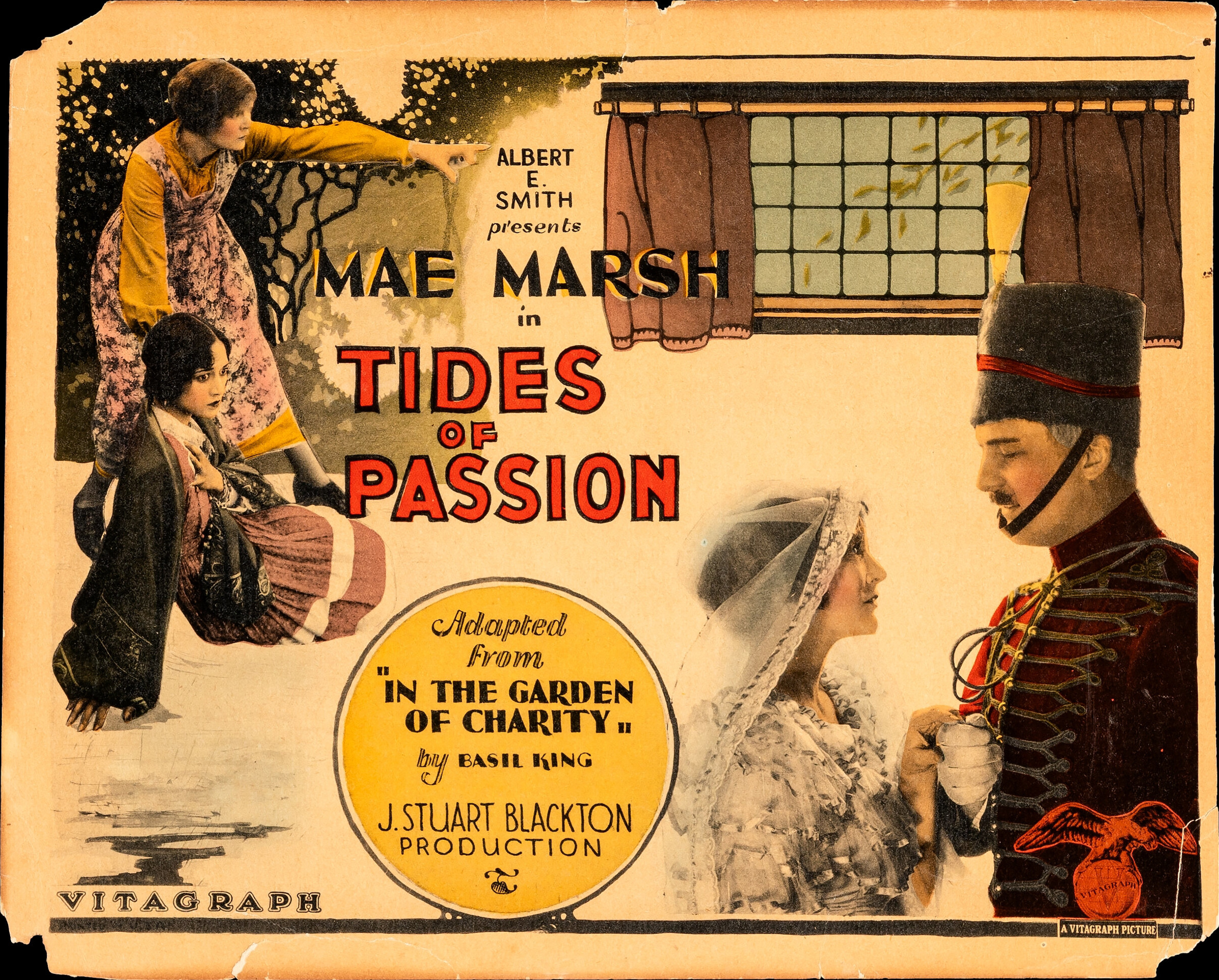
- Lobby card
- Directed by: J. Stuart Blackton
- Written by: Marian Constance Blackton; Basil King (novel)
- Produced by: Albert E. Smith
- Starring: Mae Marsh; Ben Hendricks Jr. Laska Winter
- Cinematography: William S. Adams
- Production company: Vitagraph Studios
- Distributed by: Warner Bros.
- Release date: April 19, 1925
- Running time: 70 minutes
- Country: United States
- Languages: Silent; English intertitles

Tides of Passion is a 1925 American silent drama film directed by J. Stuart Blackton and starring Mae Marsh, Ben Hendricks Jr. and Laska Winter.

== Cast ==
- Mae Marsh as Charity
- Ben Hendricks Jr. as William Pennland
- Laska Winter as Hagar
- Earl Schenck as Jonas
- Ivor McFadden as Alick
- Thomas R. Mills as Michael

== Bibliography ==
- Munden, Kenneth White. The American Film Institute Catalog of Motion Pictures Produced in the United States, Part 1. University of California Press, 1997.
