= The Uplifters (film) =

1919 US film directed by Herbert Blaché

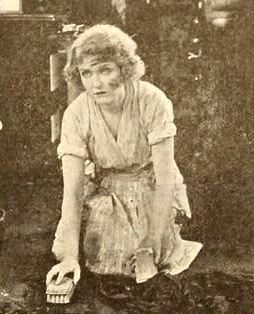
- Allison in The Uplifters
- Directed by: Herbert Blaché
- Written by: George D. Baker
- Based on: the short story, "Free" by Wallace Irwin
- Produced by: Maxwell Karger
- Starring: May Allison; Pell Trenton; Alfred Hollingsworth
- Cinematography: Eugene Gaudio
- Production company: Metro Pictures
- Release date: June 30, 1919 (US)
- Running time: 5 reels
- Country: United States
- Language: English

The Uplifters is a 1919 American silent comedy film directed by Herbert Blaché and starring May Allison, Pell Trenton, and Alfred Hollingsworth, and was released on June 30, 1919.

== Cast list ==
- May Allison as Hortense Troutt
- Pell Trenton as Saul Shilpick, Jr.
- Alfred Hollingsworth as Saul Shilpick, Sr.
- Kathleen Kerrigan as Harriet Peebles Cull
- Caroline "Spike" Rankin as Elsa
- Howard Gaye as Larry Holden
- Lois Wood as Larry's wife
