= The Great Divide (1929 film) =

1929 film directed by Reginald Barker

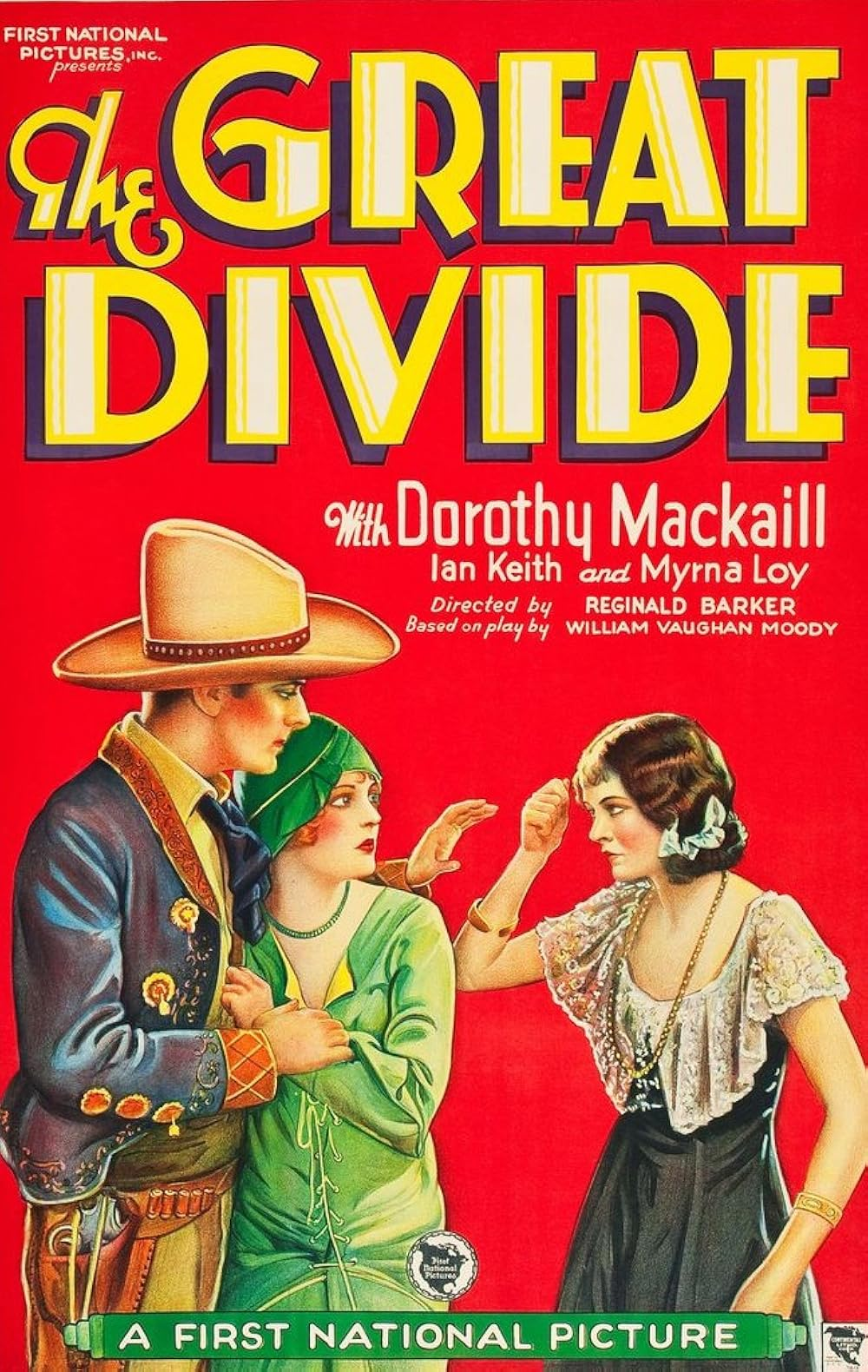
- Theatrical release poster
- Directed by: Reginald Barker
- Written by: Scenario, dialogue, intertitles: Fred Myton; Paul Perez
- Based on: The Great Divide; 1906 play by William Vaughn Moody
- Produced by: Robert North (uncredited)
- Cinematography: Lee Garmes; Alvin Knechtel
- Production company: First National Pictures
- Distributed by: Warner Bros. Pictures
- Release dates: September 15, 1929 (Vitaphone sound); October 27, 1929 (silent)
- Running time: 72 minutes
- Country: United States
- Languages: English (sound version); English intertitles (silent version)

The Great Divide is a 1929 American sound (All-Talking) pre-Code Western film directed by Reginald Barker and starring Dorothy Mackaill. Released in both silent and sound versions, it was produced and distributed by First National Pictures. The film is a remake of The Great Divide, made at MGM in 1925 and also directed by Barker. There was another remake in 1931 as the full sound film Woman Hungry. All three films are based on the 1906 Broadway play The Great Divide by William Vaughn Moody.

A print of the film is preserved at the Library of Congress. Parts of the film were shot in Zion National Park in Utah.

== Plot ==
Stephen Ghent, a mine owner, falls in love with Ruth Jordan, an arrogant girl from the East, unaware that she is the daughter of his dead partner. Ruth is vacationing in Arizona and Mexico with a fast set of friends, including her fiancé, Edgar. Manuela, a half-Spanish person hopelessly in love with Ghent, causes Ruth to return to her fiancé when she insinuates that Ghent belongs to her. Ghent follows Ruth, kidnaps her, and takes her into the wilderness to endure hardship. There she discovers that she loves Ghent, and she discards Edgar in favor of him.

== Cast ==
- Dorothy Mackaill as Ruth Jordan
- Ian Keith as Steven Ghent
- Myrna Loy as Manuela
- Lucien Littlefield as Texas Tommy
- Creighton Hale as Edgar Blossom
- George Fawcett as Macgregor
- Claude Gillingwater as Winthrop Amesbury
- Roy Stewart as Joe Morgan

== Music ==
The film's theme songs were written by Herman Ruby and Ray Perkins. The main theme song was entitled "The End Of The Lonesome Trail" and was sung by Ian Keith in the film. The song is played frequently as background music by the Vitaphone orchestra throughout the film. The secondary theme song was entitled "Si, Si, Señor" and was sung by Myrna Loy.

== See also ==
- List of early sound feature films (1926–1929)
- List of early Warner Bros. sound and talking features

== Home media ==
The film was released on DVD on April 19, 2011, through the Warner Archive Collection series.
