= The Flame of the Yukon =

The Flame of the Yukon is the title of two silent films:

- The Flame of the Yukon (1917 film)
- The Flame of the Yukon (1926 film)
