= Woman Hungry =

1931 film directed by Clarence G. Badger

- Directed by: Clarence G. Badger
- Written by: Howard Estabrook based on the play by William Vaughn Moody
- Starring: Sidney Blackmer; Lila Lee; Raymond Hatton; Fred Kohler; Kenneth Thomson
- Cinematography: Sol Polito; Charles Schoenbaum (Technicolor)
- Edited by: Alexander Hall
- Color process: Technicolor Process 3
- Production company: First National Pictures
- Distributed by: Warner Bros. Pictures
- Release date: April 4, 1931
- Running time: 65 minutes
- Country: United States
- Language: English

Woman Hungry is a 1931 American pre-Code Western film with music photographed entirely in Technicolor. The film was based on the play The Great Divide (from 1906) which was written by William Vaughn Moody. The story was filmed as a silent film by MGM as The Great Divide (1925) and as an early silent/sound hybrid by First National also called The Great Divide (1929). Its initial working title was "Under Western skies".

== Cast ==
- Sidney Blackmer as Geoffrey Brand
- Lila Lee as Judith Temple
- Raymond Hatton as Joac
- Fred Kohler as Kampen
- Kenneth Thomson as Leonard Temple
- Olive Tell as Betty Temple
- David Newell as Dr. Neil Cranford
- Tom Dugan as Same Beeman
- Blanche Friderici as Mrs. Temple
- J. Farrell MacDonald as Buzzard

== Production ==
Some scenes from the film were shot at the Mount Whitney Fish Hatchery in Independence, California.

== See also ==
- List of early color feature films
