= The Bargain (1914 film) =

1914 film directed by Reginald Barker

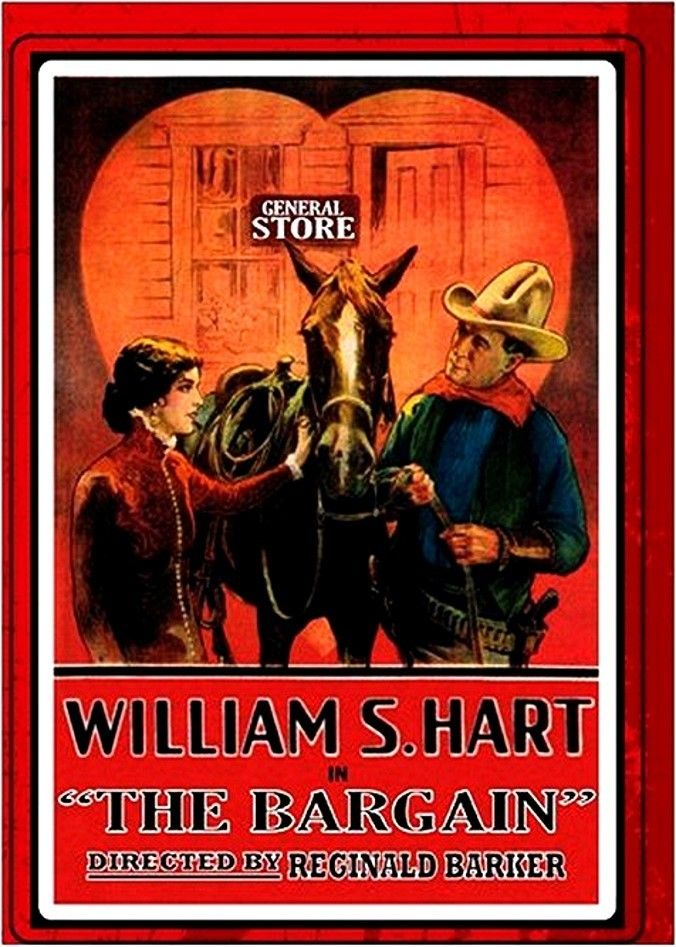
- Film poster
- Directed by: Reginald Barker
- Screenplay by: William Clifford Thomas Ince
- Starring: William S. Hart
- Cinematography: Robert Newhard; Joseph H. August
- Production company: New York Motion Pictures Corp.
- Distributed by: Paramount Pictures
- Release date: December 3, 1914
- Running time: 70 minutes
- Country: United States
- Languages: Silent; English intertitles

The Bargain

The Bargain is a 1914 American silent Western film starring William S. Hart. It was the first feature film starring Hart, who would go on to become the most popular Western actor of the silent film era. In 2010, it was one of the 25 films selected for preservation in the National Film Registry of the Library of Congress for being "culturally, historically or aesthetically significant." The second Hart Western to be named to the National Film Registry (after Hell's Hinges in 1994), The Bargain was said to have been selected because of Hart's charisma, the film's authenticity and realistic portrayal of the Western genre.

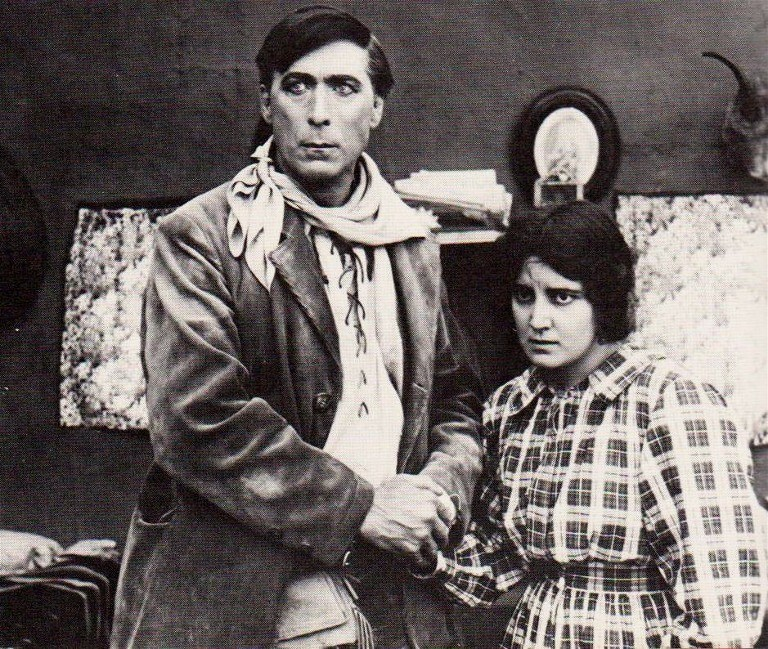
William S. Hart and Clara Williams

== Cast ==
- William S. Hart as Jim Stokes
- J. Frank Burke as Sheriff Bud Walsh
- Clara Williams as Nell Brent
- J. Barney Sherry as Phil Brent
- Joseph J. Dowling as Reverend Joshua Wilkes

== Production ==
A portion of The Bargain was filmed at the Grand Canyon in Arizona.

== Reissues ==
In 1918, a revised version of the film was submitted for review by the Chicago Board of Censors that had scenes in which the Sheriff released a prisoner to holdup gamblers and associated intertitles were eliminated, and new intertitles and scenes with newspaper articles stating that the sheriff and bandit had paid the penalty for their crimes had been inserted. A version cut from 7 to 5 reels was distributed prior to 1920, and in 1920 Hart's production company released it under the title The Two-Gun Man in the Bargain.
