= The Market of Vain Desire =

1916 film by Reginald Barker

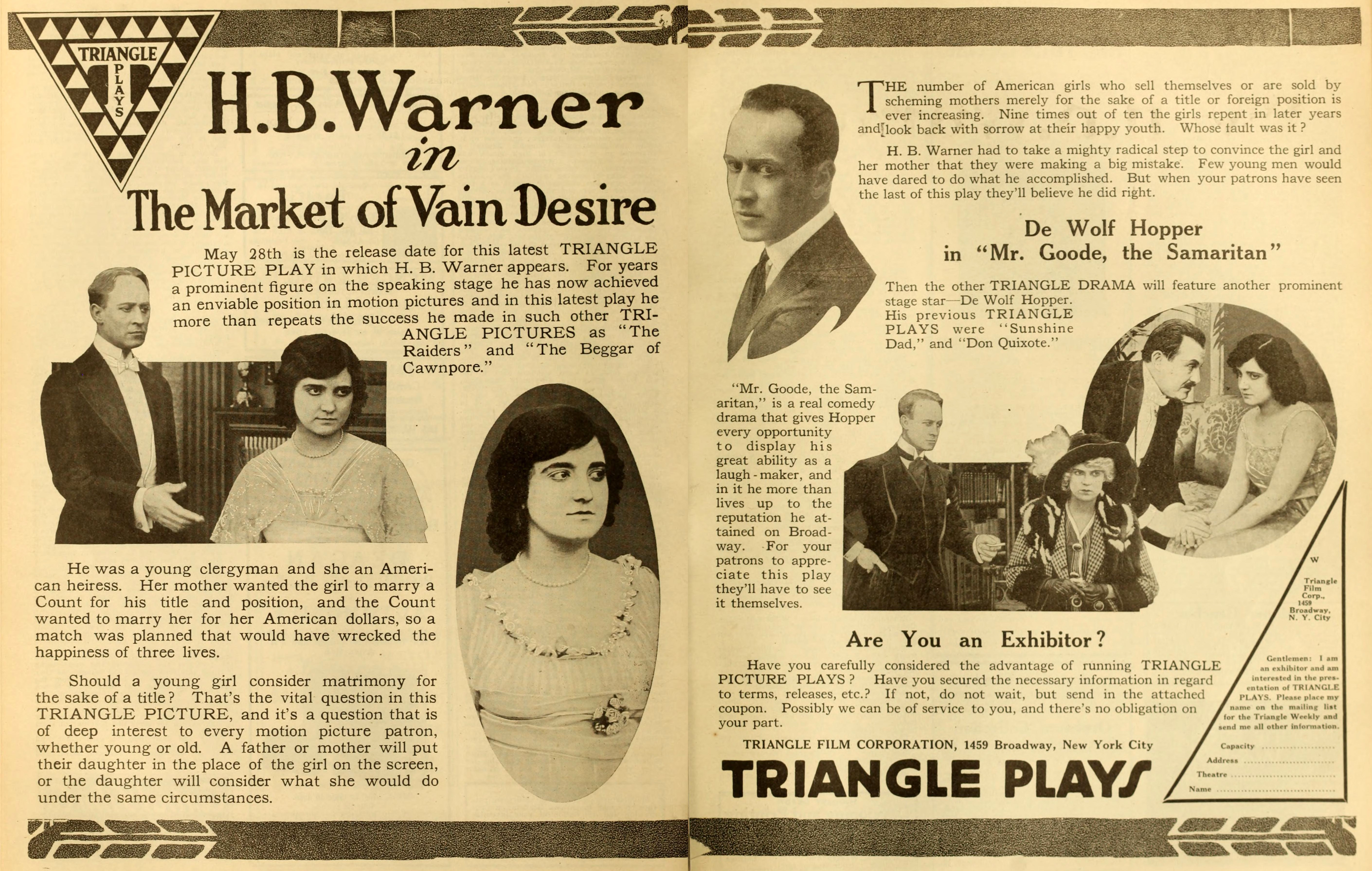
- Advertisement
- Directed by: Reginald Barker
- Story by: C. Gardner Sullivan
- Produced by: Thomas H. Ince
- Starring: Henry B. Warner; Clara Williams
- Cinematography: Charles Kaufman
- Distributed by: Triangle Film Corporation
- Release date: May 28, 1916
- Running time: 50 minutes
- Country: United States
- Language: Silent (English intertitles)

The Market of Vain Desire a 1916 American silent drama film directed by Reginald Barker. It stars Henry B. Warner and Clara Williams.

Prints of the film still exist and are preserved at the Library of Congress and with a private collector. The Market of Desire is now in the public domain.

== Cast ==
- Henry B. Warner as John Armstrong
- Clara Williams as Helen Badgley
- Charles Miller as Count Bernard d'Montaigne
- Gertrude Claire as Mrs. Bladglley
- Leona Hutton as Belle
