= Clara Williams =

American actress (1888–1928)

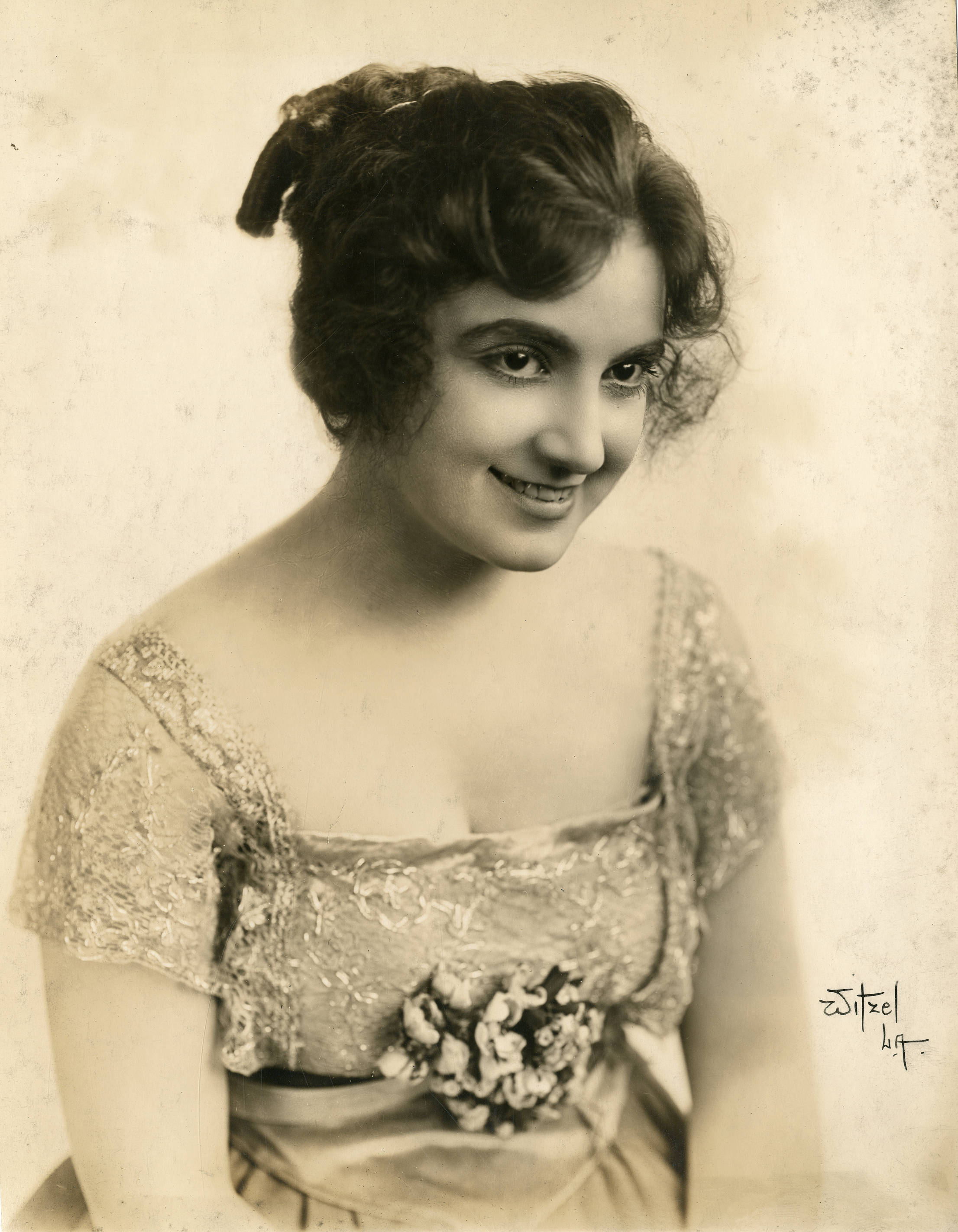
- Clara Williams in 1919
- Born: May 3, 1888; Seattle, Washington Territory, U.S.
- Died: May 8, 1928 (aged 40); Los Angeles, California, U.S.
- Resting place: Forest Lawn Memorial Park, Glendale
- Occupation: Actress
- Years active: 1910–1918
- Spouse: Reginald Barker (m. 1920–1928)

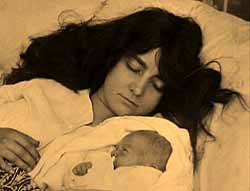
Clara Williams in The Italian, 1915

Clara Williams (May 3, 1888 – May 8, 1928) was an American silent film actress. Along with Louise Glaum and Dorothy Dalton, she was one of the principal leading ladies at Inceville, one of the first motion picture studios to make feature films in Los Angeles. Williams appeared in more than one hundred films between 1910 and 1918, including starring roles in The Italian and William S. Hart's western, Hell's Hinges, both of which are included in the National Film Registry. When she married director Reginald Barker at age 31, she retired from acting.

== Early life and career ==
Clara Williams was born in Seattle, Washington, and made her screen debut in Western Chivalry in 1910. The following year, a half page article and photo of Williams was featured in the debut issue of Motion Picture Story magazine making her the first film actress to appear in a fan magazine. The success of The Italian (1915), in which she played the wife of an immigrant, resulted in her being typecast in roles as Latin characters. In 1917, the Los Angeles Times noted, "Heretofore she has been known almost exclusively as a portrayer of Latin parts, simply because she was such success in that sort of a role in The Italian, in which she played the leading part opposite George Beban."

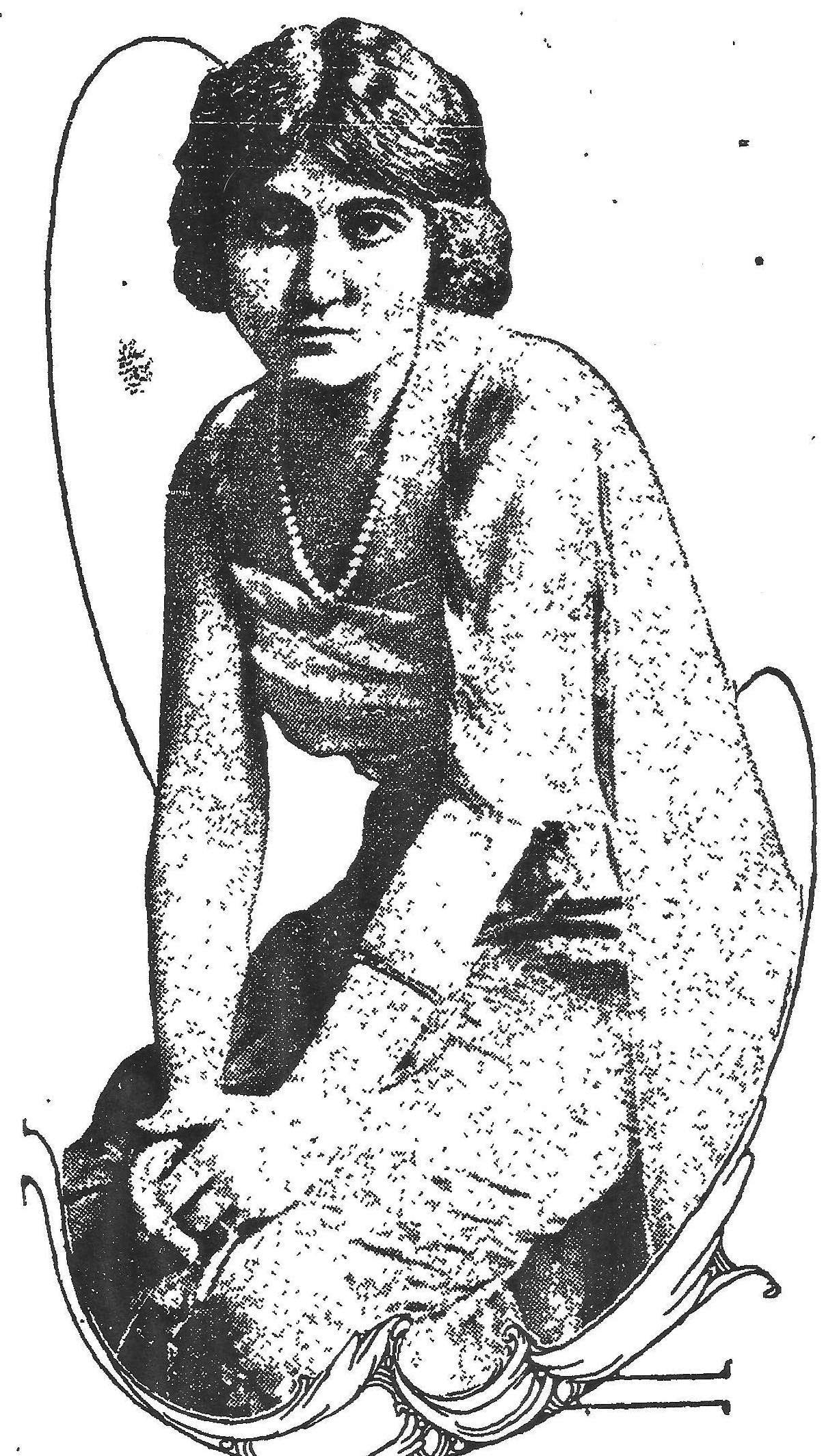
A sketch of Williams in 1915

In 1917, Williams and several other of the important actors and directors from Inceville left the studio to join the newly formed Paralta Company. The Los Angeles Times wrote, "Now that she is at the head of her own company and has the right to choose her own stories, she will have all the freedom in the world to show her versatility." Williams first film with Paralta, and also the last film in her acting career, was a story of the Klondike Gold Rush, Carmen of the Klondike.

During her years with the Triangle studios, Williams had become known for her many gowns, and the phrase "forty famous frocks" was coined to describe her wardrobe. When Williams left Triangle for Paralta, the Los Angeles Times asked whether the famous frocks would move with her. It reported, "Clara is now in a quandary. She wants to get some more frocks, but if she does it will spoil the phrase 'forty famous frocks,' and that would never do."

While working at the Ince studios, Williams met director Reginald Barker. He directed her in numerous films, including The Man from Oregon (1915), The Criminal (1916), Three of Many (1917), Paws of the Bear (1917), The One Woman (1918), and Carmen of the Klondike (1918), which was her last screen appearance. She married Barker in February 1920 and retired.

== Later years and death ==
In 1925, the Los Angeles Times interviewed the former movie star who the Times reported was "now just a housewife." At the time, Williams said that she and her husband had never had a quarrel and defended her new domestic life by stating, "To me there is no comparison in the amount of pleasure to be enjoyed from home life as opposed to a career."

In late February 1928, the Los Angeles Times reported that Williams had undergone a major surgery for an undisclosed condition at the California Lutheran Hospital. On May 8, 1928, five days after her 40th birthday, she died at her Los Angeles home following what the media reported as "a prolonged illness." She was survived by her husband and a brother. Her funeral was held at the Little Church of the Flowers, and her remains were cremated at Forest Lawn Memorial Park in Glendale, California.

== Filmography ==
Year	Title	Role	Notes
1910	Western Chivalry	The Ranch Boss's Niece	Short
1910	The Cowboy's Sweetheart	Jennie	Short
1910	The Millionaire and the Ranch Girl	Nellie Blair	Short
1910	A Cowboy's Vindication	Faro Nan	Short
1912	Red Saunders' Sacrifice	Mary Warren	Short
1912	Over the Divide	Nell Carter	Short
1912	The Minister and the Outlaw	Helen Page	Short
1912	The Renegades	Mrs. Jim Carson	Short
1912	Bar K Foreman	Nellie - the Rancher's Daughter	Short
1913	The Love Token	Mary Simpson	Short
1913	On the Mountain Ranch	Ethel Fordham	Short
1913	Papita's Destiny	Papita	Short
1913	The Witch of Salem		Short
1914	For the Wearing of the Green	Norah Dwyer	Short
1914	The Bells of Austi	Mercedes	Short
1914	His Hour of Manhood	Anne Larson	Short
1914	The Bargain	Nell Brent	Alternative title: The Two-Gun Man in the Bargain
1915	The Italian	Annette Ancello Donnetti	
1915	The Secret of the Dead	Maria Carrillo	Short
1915	The Devil	Elsa	
1915	On the Night Stage	Saloon Girl	Uncredited
1915	When Love Leads	Mary Dunning - the Elder Sister	Short
1915	The Man from Oregon	Harriet Lane	
1915	The Winged Idol	Mildred Leonard	
1916	The Corner	Mrs. Adams	
1916	The Last Act	Mrs. Cora Hale	
1916	Hell's Hinges	Faith Henley	
1916	The Market of Vain Desire	Helen Badgley	
1916	Home	Inez Wheaton	
1916	The Criminal	Naneta	
1916	Three of Many	Nina Antinni	
1917	Paws of the Bear	Olga Raminoff	
1918	Carmen of the Klondike	Dorothy Harlan	
1918	The One Woman	Kate Ransom	(final film role)
