= The White Desert (1925 film) =

1925 film by Reginald Barker

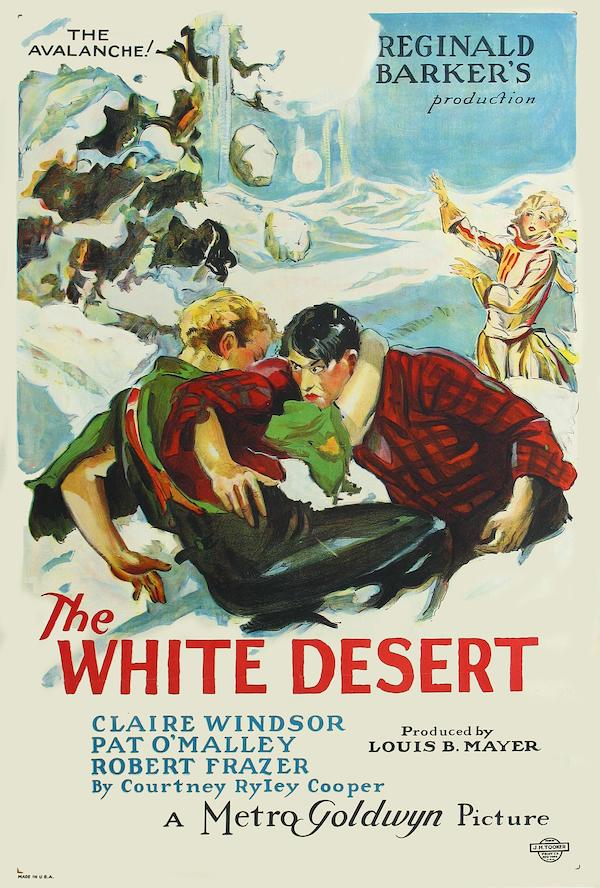
- Theatrical release poster
- Directed by: Reginald Barker
- Written by: Monte M. Katterjohn; Gordon Rigby; Lew Lipton
- Based on: The White Desert by Courtney Riley Cooper
- Starring: Claire Windsor; Pat O'Malley
- Cinematography: Percy Hilburn (*French)
- Distributed by: Metro-Goldwyn-Mayer
- Release date: May 4, 1925
- Running time: 70 minutes
- Country: United States
- Language: Silent (English intertitles)

The White Desert is a 1925 American silent drama film directed by Reginald Barker. The film stars Claire Windsor and Pat O'Malley, with Robert Frazer, Frank Currier, and Sōjin Kamiyama. It is written by Monte M. Katterjohn and Gordon Rigby and adopted from Denver author Courtney Ryley Cooper's novel The White Desert (1922). This B movie was produced to keep the Loew circuit and other cinemas supplied. The title refers to the snow covered Colorado landscape during winter.

== Plot ==
As described in a film magazine and newspaper reviews, Barry, the engineer for a construction company, criticizes the foreman for the method he is pursuing for tunneling for railroad construction. The snow ledges have been weakened by the constant dynamiting. With the next explosion of dynamite, an avalanche results which destroys the ledges and nearly wipes out the camp. The surviving workers are isolated, desperate and shattered by the disaster, and unable to obtain food. Foster and his wife have no milk for their child. With hard work, Barry strikes out and works his way out and is able to reach a telephone line, which he taps and calls for help. A relief train with snow plows makes its way through the snow pile and arrives with food and assistance. The camp is saved and Barry wins the affection of Robinette, the daughter of the railroad president.

== Cast ==
- Claire Windsor as Robinette
- Pat O'Malley as Barry
- Robert Frazer as Keith
- Frank Currier as Saul MacFarlane
- William Eugene as Foster
- Roy Laidlaw as Engineer
- Sōjin Kamiyama as Chinese Cook
- Priscilla Bonner as Mrs. Foster
- Snitz Edwards as Runt
- Milton Ross as Doctor Carter
- Matthew Betz as Buck Carson
- Sidney Bracey (uncredited)
- David Dunbar (uncredited)
- Trixie Friganza (uncredited)
- Bert Sprotte (uncredited)

== Production ==
The film was shot on Rollins Pass, Colorado, at the Corona townsite, during construction of the Moffat Tunnel, which commenced in 1923 and was completed in 1928. Corona was a town dedicated to keeping the rail line open during the harsh winter, and was partially underground in a trench along the tracks, and under a snow shed. Claire Windsor was invited to Denver for a celebration and parade on February 26, 1928, for the opening of the Moffat Tunnel.

== Preservation ==
A print of The White Desert was donated by MGM to the George Eastman Museum.
