= Paws of the Bear =

1917 film directed by Reginald Barker

- Directed by: Reginald Barker
- Written by: J.G. Hawks
- Produced by: Thomas H. Ince
- Starring: William Desmond; Clara Williams; Robert McKim
- Production company: Kay-Bee Pictures
- Distributed by: Triangle Distributing
- Release date: June 17, 1917
- Running time: 50 minutes
- Country: United States
- Languages: Silent; English intertitles

Paws of the Bear is a 1917 American war drama film directed by Reginald Barker and starring William Desmond, Clara Williams and Robert McKim.

== Cast ==
- William Desmond as Ray Bourke
- Clara Williams as Olga Raminoff
- Robert McKim as Boris Drakoff
- Wallace Worsley as Curt Schrieber
- Charles K. French as Gen. von Mittendorf

== Preservation ==
This is a lost film as no prints survive.

== Bibliography ==
- Taves, Brian. Thomas Ince: Hollywood's Independent Pioneer. University Press of Kentucky, 2012.
