= Silk Husbands and Calico Wives =

1920 film by Alfred E. Green

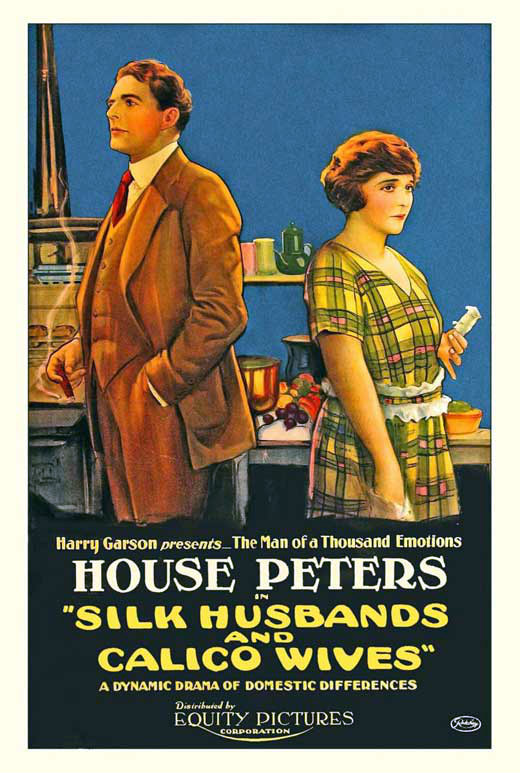
- Theatrical poster
- Directed by: Alfred E. Green
- Written by: Monte Katterjohn (story, scenario)
- Produced by: Harry Garson
- Starring: House Peters; Mary Alden
- Cinematography: David Kesson
- Production company: Garson Studios
- Distributed by: Equity Pictures Corporation
- Release date: February 1920
- Running time: 52 minutes
- Country: United States
- Language: Silent (English intertitles)

Silk Husbands and Calico Wives is a 1920 American silent drama film directed by Alfred E. Green and starring House Peters. The film was produced by Harry Garson and based on an original by Monte Katterjohn.

The film is preserved at the Library of Congress.

== Plot ==
As described in a film magazine, Deane Kendall (Peters), a country boy who has succeeded in being admitted to the bar, finds few clients in the small village of Harmony. When there is a sensational case involving a man being tried for the murder of his wife's lover, Edith Beecher (Alden), court stenographer and Deane's sweetheart, manages to arrange for Deane to defend the husband. Deane's masterful defense frees the man and Deane wins a position with a city law firm. Deane marries Edith and they move to the city. Deane makes rapid progress but Edith remains a "home body." Society girl Georgia Wilson (Novak) determines to break up this family so she can have Deane for herself. She is aided in her plans by an architect who loves Edith. Through a trick, Edith is lured to the architect's apartment. Edith believes that Deane, with his strict views concerning a wife's conduct, will divorce Edith. However, a madly jealous discarded sweetheart of the architect informs Deane of the whole plot. Edith, thinking she has made her husband unhappy and fearing his wrath concerning her visit to the architect, has fled the city to return to her village home. Deane follows her and a reconciliation takes place.

== Cast ==
- House Peters as Deane Kendall
- Mary Alden as Edith Beecher Kendall
- Mildred Reardon as Marcia Lawson
- Edward Kimball as Jerome Appleby
- Sam Sothern as Alec Beecher
- Eva Novak as Georgia Wilson
- Vincent Serrano as Charles Madison
- Rosita Marstini as Mrs. Westervelt (billed as Madame Marstini)
