= Carmen of the Klondike =

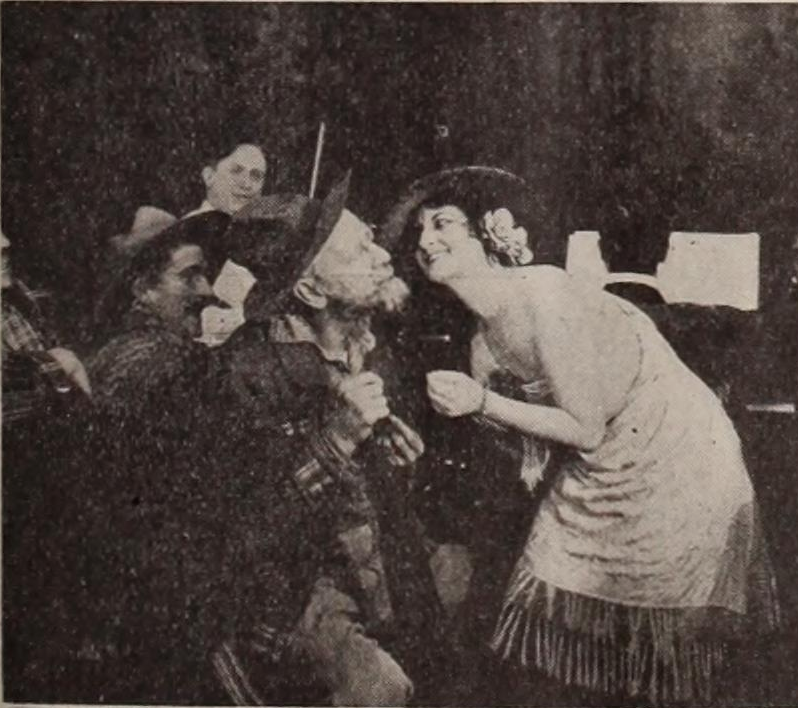
- Clara Williams
- Directed by: Reginald Barker
- Written by: Monte M. Katterjohn
- Produced by: Robert Brunton
- Starring: Clara Williams
- Cinematography: Robert S. Newhard
- Production companies: Selexart Pictures, Inc.
- Release date: March 1918
- Running time: 7 reels
- Country: United States
- Language: Silent (English intertitles)

Carmen of the Klondike is a lost 1918 American silent drama film directed by Reginald Barker from a story and scenario written by Monte M. Katterjohn. The film was produced by Selexart Pictures, Inc. and distributed on a state's rights basis.

== Plot ==
According to a film magazine, "Dorothy Harlan, a vaudeville singer in the States, is on her way to Alaska to join her fiance, Cameron Stewart. On the boat she befriends a stowaway and incidentally incurs the enmity of "Silk" MacDonald, saloon owner and generally recognized as ruler of the town for which Dorothy is bound. MacDonald vows to get her for himself and plans to blacken Stewart's name. Arriving in Seward "Silk" frames up Stewart and has him drugged and put to bed by one of the dance-hall girls. Dorothy finds him in this predicament and takes the natural course of breaking the engagement. She accepts a position as singer in MacDonald's place and Stewart, after recovering from the effects of the drug, joins in the gold rush. MacDonald joins the prospectors and keeps his eye open for trouble. Stewart locates a rich claim but MacDonald, nursing a secret enmity for him, jumps the claim and beats him. The old stowaway happens along and rescues the unconscious Stewart. The faithful man hastens back to the settlement and invokes the aid of Dorothy in filing the claim for Stewart. MacDonald returns and finds that Stewart had beaten him to the claim, but arranges a private dinner for Dorothy and himself. Plying MacDonald with wine, Dorothy has him good and drunk and attempts an escape. A lamp is overturned and the place catches fire. Dorothy is rescued by Stewart, who gets MacDonald and beats him up. In the course of the fight an old enemy, whose wife had been stolen by MacDonald, seeing his chance to get even, pulls a gun and kills MacDonald. The men accept Stewart as their new leader and he and Dorothy are reunited."

== Production ==
In November 1917, filming began with scenes involving 200 people being shot on Santa Catalina Island.. Three acres of the Paralta Plays studio backlot were dedicated to creating an Alaskan village, and snowy scenes were shot on location in Truckee, California. Production wrapped up in late December.

== Cast ==
- Clara Williams as Dorothy Harlan
- Herschel Mayall as "Silk" McDonald
- Edward Coxen as Cameron Stewart
- Joseph J. Dowling as Saleratus Joe

== Censorship ==
Before Carmen of the Klondike could be exhibited in Kansas, the Kansas Board of Review required the elimination of several scenes. Eliminations included; a woman smoking and flirting with a drunk man, a woman laying at the foot of a man's bed, the shortening of a gambling scene and suggestive embrace, a struggle scene between a man and woman, and shortening of a fight scene between two men.

The Chicago Board of Censors also made numerous eliminations, including removing 14 scenes from the final fight.

== Preservation ==
With no holdings located in archives, Carmen of the Klondike is considered a lost film.
