= Harriet Converse Moody =

American businesswoman and arts patron (1857–1932)

- Born: March 18, 1857; Parkman, Ohio, U.S.
- Died: February 22, 1932 (aged 74); Chicago, Illinois, U.S.
- Education: Cornell University
- Occupations: Arts patron; businesswoman
- Years active: 1889–1932
- Known for: Restaurant and catering business; Poetry patronage
- Spouse: William Vaughn Moody (m. 1909; died 1910)

Harriet Converse Moody (March 18, 1857 – February 22, 1932) was an American businesswoman and arts patron. Moody began her career in Chicago in 1889, working as a schoolteacher and then forming a successful restaurant and catering business that operated for almost 40 years. After her brief marriage to the poet William Vaughn Moody, which ended upon his death of brain cancer, she became a patron to artists, particularly poets.

== Early life ==
Born in Parkman, Ohio, on March 18, 1857, Harriet Converse moved with her father, a livestock broker, and mother to Chicago c. 1867. She attended the Howland School in Union Springs, New York, and graduated with an English literature degree from Cornell University in 1876. After attending the Woman's Medical College of Pennsylvania for one year, she made her society debut in Chicago and married the lawyer Edward Brainard; they divorced in the 1880s.

== Restaurant business ==
Home Delicacies Association
- Type: Private
- Industry: Food service
- Founded: 1889 in Chicago, Illinois, U.S.
- Founder: Harriet Converse
- Defunct: 1929
- Area served: Chicago metropolitan area

Following the death of her father, Moody became the primary caregiver for her mother. In 1889, she began working as a schoolteacher; Alice Corbin Henderson was one of her students. That same year, after "a series of culinary experiments with chicken salad and gingerbread", she founded a catering and restaurant company, Home Delicacies Association. Impressed with her food, Harry Gordon Selfridge, then the manager of the Marshall Field's department store, gave her the contract for the store's restaurant space. Her company served food in the food spaces of several other local institutions, such as the Field Museum of Natural History and the Chicago Little Theatre; on Pullman dining cars; and at the London branch of Selfridges. Moody also operated restaurants, such as Le Petit Gourmet, that were positively received. The company failed in 1929 as Moody's interests shifted towards supporting the arts; upon Moody's death, the poet Harriet Monroe wrote: "Lavish to the last, it was no wonder that Mrs. Moody's fortune faded out two or three years ago."

== Arts patron ==
In 1892, Moody studied as a graduate student in the English department of the University of Chicago. In 1899, she met the poet William Vaughn Moody, who was an English professor at the university. They became friends over their mutual interests in poetry and spirituality, and "[e]ach found an idealization of gender in the other". They married in 1909, and remained together until William's death of brain cancer in 1910.

After William's death, Harriet became an arts patron, with a focus on poetry and modern art, during the first "renaissance" in Chicago literature. She was a founding sponsor of the magazine Poetry and contributed her late husband's poem "I Am the Woman" for its first issue. She hosted poets and artists at her home in the South Side of Chicago, sending her chauffeur to pick them up at Union Station. Her biographer Susan Albertine wrote: "Dinner parties and late-night poetry readings in her drawing room became legendary."

Moody befriended and advanced the profiles of dozens of notable artists through arranging poetry readings—including at her restaurant Le Petit Gourmet and universities—and providing career and business advice. In addition to her home in Chicago, she hosted artists as guests at "[h]er apartment in Greenwich Village, her farm in West Cummington, Massachusetts, and her summer retreat at Mackinac Island". Albertine wrote: "Her salon, in effect an art colony, moved with her, offering material means for creative work before public and foundation grants were generally available."

Her clients included:

- Maxwell Bodenheim
- Padraic Colum
- Hart Crane
- Countee Cullen
- Walter de la Mare
- Richard Eberhart
- Robert Frost
- Alfred Kreymborg
- Amy Lowell
- Vachel Lindsay
- Percy MacKaye
- Edgar Lee Masters
- John Masefield
- Harriet Monroe
- Yone Noguchi
- Carl Sandburg
- James Stephens
- Rabindranath Tagore
- Ridgely Torrence

== Final years ==
After the failure of her catering and restaurant company in 1929, Moody turned to teaching and writing to support herself. She died on February 22, 1932, in Chicago.

== Sources ==
- Albertine, Susan (February 2000) [1999]. "Moody, Harriet Converse". American National Biography. Oxford University Press. doi:10.1093/anb/9780198606697.article.1603351.
- Monroe, Harriet (April 1932). "News Notes". Poetry. Vol. 40, no. 1. pp. 53–57. JSTOR 20578493.
- "Milestones". Time. March 7, 1932. Archived from the original on January 23, 2025.
