= The Devil (1915 film) =

1915 film by Reginald Barker

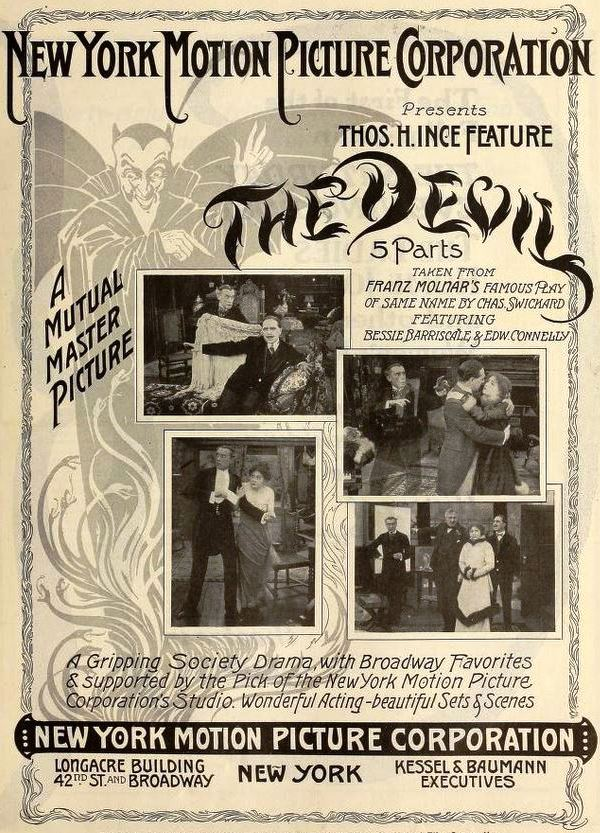
- Advertisement for The Devil in the film magazine Reel Life, 1915
- Directed by: Reginald Barker
- Written by: Ferenc Molnár (original play); Charles Swickard; Thomas H. Ince
- Produced by: Thomas H. Ince
- Starring: Bessie Barriscale
- Distributed by: Mutual Film
- Release date: April 1, 1915
- Country: USA
- Languages: Silent; English titles

The Devil is a 1915 American silent film version of the Ferenc Molnár play, adapted by Thomas Ince. It was directed by Ince and Reginald Barker and stars Bessie Barriscale and Edward Connelly.

The film was re-edited and re-released on the State's Rights market in 1918-1919 as part of a Bessie Barriscale series.

== Plot ==
The Devil, in the guise of a human, meets a young couple who remark upon looking at a Renaissance painting of a martyr that Evil could never triumph over Good. The Devil, taking this as a challenge, decides to bring about the couple's downfall.

== Cast ==
- Bessie Barriscale as Isabella Zanden
- Edward Connelly as The devil
- Arthur Maude as Harry Lang
- Clara Williams as Elsa
- Rhea Mitchell as Milli
- J. Barney Sherry as Alfred Zanden
- Arthur Hollingsworth as Andrews

== Production ==
During production of the film, Thomas H. Ince reported that the county sheriff arrived on set, who had been informed that there were nude women acting in the film. He stated that the claim had originated with a local minister, who believed the film would be similar to classic paintings that contained nude lost souls.

== Preservation ==
Complete prints of The Devil are held by the Library of Congress and the Cineteca Del Friuli in Gemona del Friuli. The Library of Congress print is on 16 mm film.
