= The Italian (1915 film) =

1915 American silent film by Reginald Barker

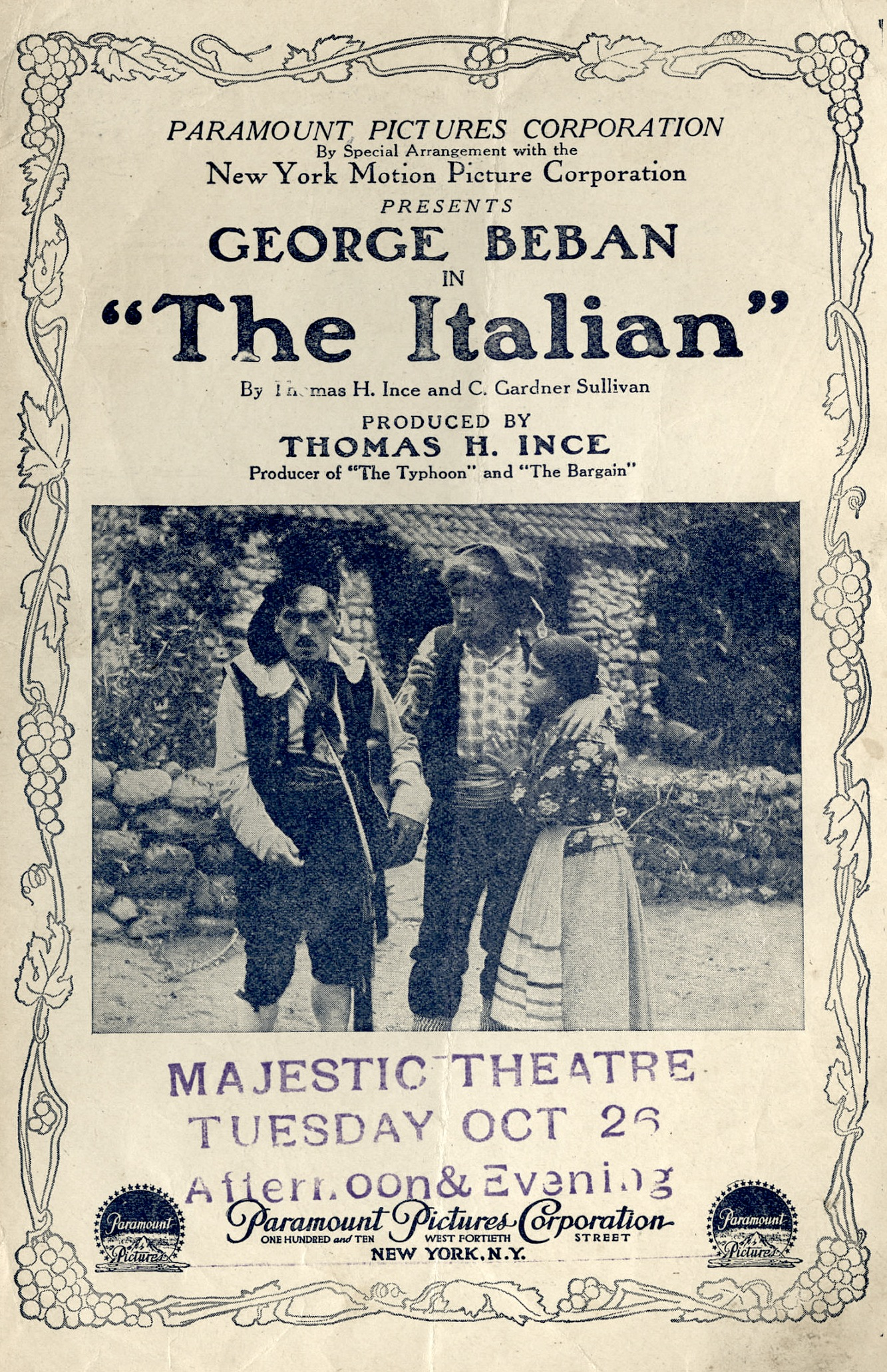
- Contemporary pamphlet for the film
- Directed by: Reginald Barker
- Written by: Thomas H. Ince; C. Gardner Sullivan
- Produced by: Thomas H. Ince
- Starring: George Beban; Clara Williams
- Cinematography: Joseph H. August
- Music by: Victor Schertzinger (uncredited)
- Production company: New York Motion Picture Corp.
- Distributed by: Paramount Pictures
- Release date: June 18, 1915
- Running time: 78 minutes
- Country: United States
- Languages: Silent; English intertitles

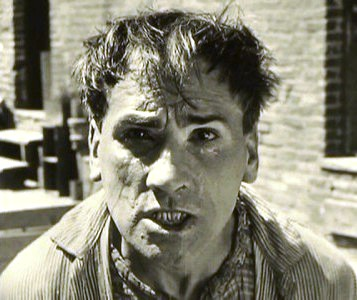
George Beban in The Italian

The Italian is a 1915 American silent film feature which tells the story of an Italian gondolier who comes to the United States to make his fortune but instead winds up working as a shoeshiner and experiencing tragedy while living with his wife and child in a tenement on New York's Lower East Side. The film was produced by Thomas H. Ince, directed by Reginald Barker, and co-written by C. Gardner Sullivan and Ince. The film stars stage actor George Beban in the title role as the Italian immigrant, Pietro "Beppo" Donnetti. In 1991, this film was deemed "culturally, historically, or aesthetically significant" by the United States Library of Congress and selected for preservation in the National Film Registry.

== Plot ==
The Italian

The film tells the story of Pietro "Beppo" Donnetti. Donnetti is a poor, but happy, gondolier in Venice, Italy. Beppo falls in love with Annette Ancello, but her father, Trudo, wants her to marry another suitor, one who is a successful businessman. If Beppo can prove himself within a year, Trudo agrees to allow him to marry Annette.

Beppo sails for America to make his fortune, making a living working as a shoeshiner on a street corner in New York City. He borrows money from an Irish ward boss, Bill Corrigan, and sends for Annette to join him. In exchange, Beppo agrees to help Corrigan's candidate win the Italian vote in the ward.

When Annette arrives in New York, she and Beppo are married, and the following year they have a son, Tony. Beppo, Annette and Tony live a happy life in their Lower East Side tenement. The happiness is interrupted when the baby contracts a fever during a heatwave. The doctor instructs them to feed pasteurized milk to the baby. Beppo works hard to earn the money to purchase the expensive milk. While walking to the store to buy the milk, Beppo is robbed. He attacks the men who robbed him and is arrested. Beppo asks Corrigan to help his baby while he is in jail: "I must get-a-de-milk or my babee is die." Corrigan rebuffs Beppo, and Beppo's baby dies during Beppo's five days in jail.

When Beppo is released from jail, he learns that Corrigan's young daughter is ill and vows to avenge his son's death by killing Corrigan's daughter. Beppo sneaks into Corrigan's house, but when he sees Corrigan's daughter lying in her crib, he cannot act on his plan, and he leaves the child unharmed.

In the final scene of the narrative, Beppo is shown placing flowers and sobbing over his son's grave.

== Prologue and epilogue ==
The film employs a prologue and epilogue to frame the narrative story. In the prologue, a stage curtain rises and shows the lead actor, George Beban, in an upper class apartment wearing a smoking jacket. He sits on a couch and opens a book titled "The Italian" by Thomas H. Ince and C. Gardner Sullivan. As he begins reading, the film fades into the narrative story. In the epilogue, the film shifts from the image of Beppo kneeling at his son's grave to Beban turning to the last page of the book, closing the book and looking thoughtful. The stage curtain is then drawn closed.

Some critics have suggested the prologue and epilogue were intended to demonstrate the care with which Beban, a noted stage actor, had selected a story worthy of his talents.

== Production ==
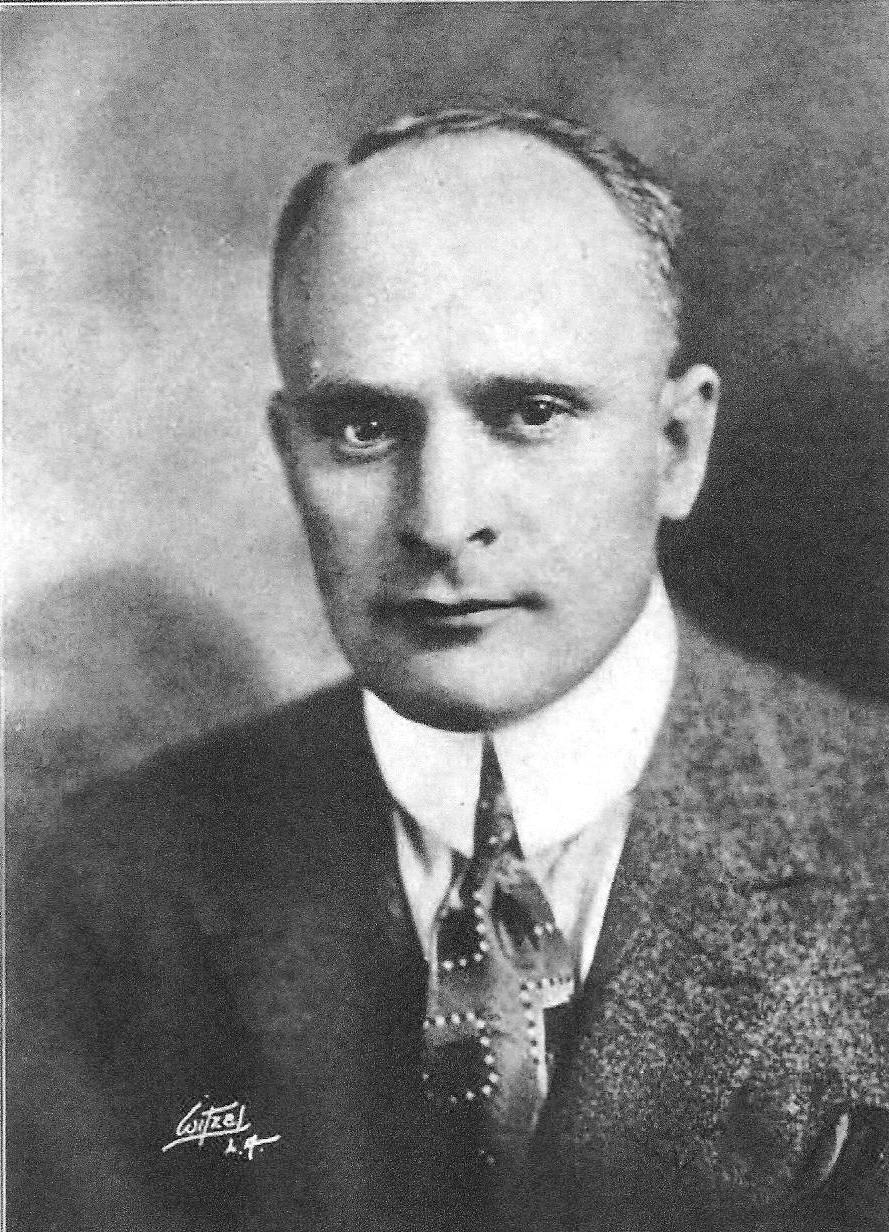
Screenwriter C. Gardner Sullivan (pictured) wrote the story with Thomas H. Ince.

Historical accounts indicate that Thomas Ince and C. Gardner Sullivan had originally titled their project Dago, but agreed to change the title at the request of the film's star, George Beban. The Italian marked the first motion picture role for Beban, who had gained acclaim as a Broadway actor and vaudevillian specializing in ethnic caricatures. Beban only agreed to join the project for a salary of $7000 and a percentage of the films profits.

Ince and Sullivan are credited with writing the film's story, but film historian Kevin Brownlow has shown that the plot was essentially lifted from the earlier Independent Moving Pictures (Ince's former employer) film The Wop (1913).

Though set on Manhattan's Lower East Side, the New York scenes for The Italian were shot in the immigrant quarter of San Francisco. While most accounts indicate that the scenes of Beppo as a gondolier were shot in the Venice district of Los Angeles, an account published by the Los Angeles Times in November 1914 reported that "Ince sent Beban to Italy to get special canal scenes for the eight-reel play."

One of the vivid scenes in The Italian is the fight scene between Beppo and his muggers. The scene lasts five minutes on the screen, and a newspaper story reported that, for realism, "a number of the biggest men at Inceville were used in the scene."

In a story on the production of The Italian, a newspaper reported that a hundred pounds of rice were bought for the film's wedding scene. An initial order of fifty pounds of rice was left uncovered overnight by a "property man" at the Inceville studio. A "heavy rain caused each grain to swell to enormous proportions," requiring the purchase of another fifty pounds of rice.

== Cast ==
- George Beban as Pietro "Beppo" Donnetti
- Clara Williams as Annette Ancello Donnetti
- J. Frank Burke as Trudo Ancello
- Leo Willis as Bill Corrigan
- Fanny Midgley

== Critical reception ==
=== Initial reviews ===
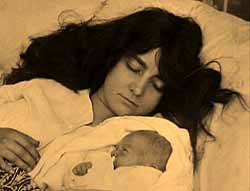
Clara Williams as Beppo's wife, Annette, with "Little Tony"

Upon the release of The Italian, the Los Angeles Times gave the film a positive review which included the following comments:

"There are possibilities in the role of Pietro, in 'The Italian' ... that a less clever character artist than George Beban might overlook ... The story is full of human interest, requiring a full understanding of the character, and Beban by look and gesture is at all times in fullest sympathy with the difficult role. ... [A]ll go to make a story that pulsates with human interest. The pathos of the child's death because of the lack of necessities and the imprisonment of the poor Italian furnish the real lesson of the Ghetto."

The Washington Post called it "a fascinating story," and "a simple story of ghetto life, showing that love, faith, and loyalty are not unknown quantities in this dark sphere."

A newspaper in Fort Wayne, Indiana praised the film for its "rare quality of charm and a warmth of appeal that is truly unique" and concluded: "Here is a story beautiful and exquisite in theme ... Its simplicity and utter humanness have an appeal that reaches straight to the heart of the onlooker." Another review in the same paper also commended the "simple beauty of the story itself" and also praised Beban's performance:

"George Beban, who has the difficult role of Pietro Donnetti, gives a piece of character work that is truly marvelous. This artist has developed mimicry to its highest form of expression. His mobile countenance mirrored every emotion so perfectly, each varying mood was portrayed so truly, that it was hard to believe that this man was naught but a pantomimist. The upward glance when the heart was bitten again by the fangs of emotion, the hysterical joy of the Latin nature when in high spirits, all these phrases were delineated by this artist in a way that moved and thrilled."

A newspaper in San Antonio, Texas praised the "vein of innocent humor" that runs through the film at the expense of Beppo and concluded: "'The Italian' is regarded as Thomas H. Ince's masterpiece and is said to be greater than his 'Wrath of the Gods,' 'The Typhoon' and 'The Bargain.'"

=== Modern assessments ===
In 2008, The Italian was released on DVD as part of a two-disc compilation titled, "Perils of the New Land: Films of the Immigrant Experience (1910-1915)." At the time of the DVD release, The New York Times praised the film for Reginald Barker's strong direction, including his use of a mobile camera and "liberal use of close-up" which give the film a subjective, personal feel. The Times also praised Beban's "powerful lead performance" which it described as follows:

"The audience is drawn to identify with Beppo, even though he remains in many respects an appalling ethnic caricature: dark, brooding, vengeful. That Barker and Beban are able to create so much sympathy for Beppo, despite their own, occasionally quite obvious condescension to the character, is a mark of emerging maturity in the movie business; no longer are films dealing in one-dimensional 'types.'"

The Los Angeles Times in 2008 described The Italian as "a shameless melodrama that, despite unfortunate stereotypes, musters considerable sympathy for its titular immigrant." The Times also noted that "Beban, the silent-era star known for his ethnic impersonations, hams up a storm as Beppo, a jaunty Venetian."

The film publication Cineaste published a review of The Italian in March 2009, focusing on the film's depiction of the Italian-American immigrant experience as a Darwinian jungle rather than a promised land paved with gold:

"Against Horatio Alger expectations, The Italian is a story of failure suffused with a soft-focused, dappled nostalgia for the old country ... 'From sunny Italy to the New York ghetto,' read the taglines on Paramount's original one-sheet, contrasting scenes of 'carefree Beppo at home' in the serene canals of Old Italy with the mean streets of New York where 'to live your baby must have Pasteurized milk.' America is not a promised land paved with gold but a Darwinian jungle, where dreams meet dead ends."

Cineaste also credited Beban for his intense performance, commenting on the fight sequence in which Beban's character "seethes with murderous determination" as the camera focuses on his face in an extreme close-up: "Beban's sudden transformation from amiability to wrath recalls the first glimpse of Spencer Tracy after nearly being lynched in Fritz Lang's Fury."

A reviewer for the publication Bright Sights wrote that the film had a powerfully downbeat conclusion with a social message:

"Projecting overwhelming grief, Beban reveals some hefty acting chops, and The Italian certainly gets its liberal point across, a model of how American movies dress social consciousness in the garb of melodrama. Even here, in its infancy, feature film was eager to pick up the call for social reform that sounded out in urban America before the First World War."

In his 2004 historical book on the depiction of Italians in Hollywood movies, Peter Bondanella praised the film:

"A number of elements sets The Italian apart from the other films treating the Italian immigrant experience. ... Its melodramatic plot reflects a serious sense of artistic construction, aimed at milking the last bit of emotion out of the audience. George Beban's outstanding performance shows his roots in the dramatic theater. ... Finally, the depiction of the tragic story of Beppo shows a certain sympathy for the character of the poor Italian bootblack but also includes a callous disregard for depicting Italian immigrants in a stereotypical manner, an attitude that no doubt reflected the opinions of the majority of Americans at the time. Its plot is simple and compelling."

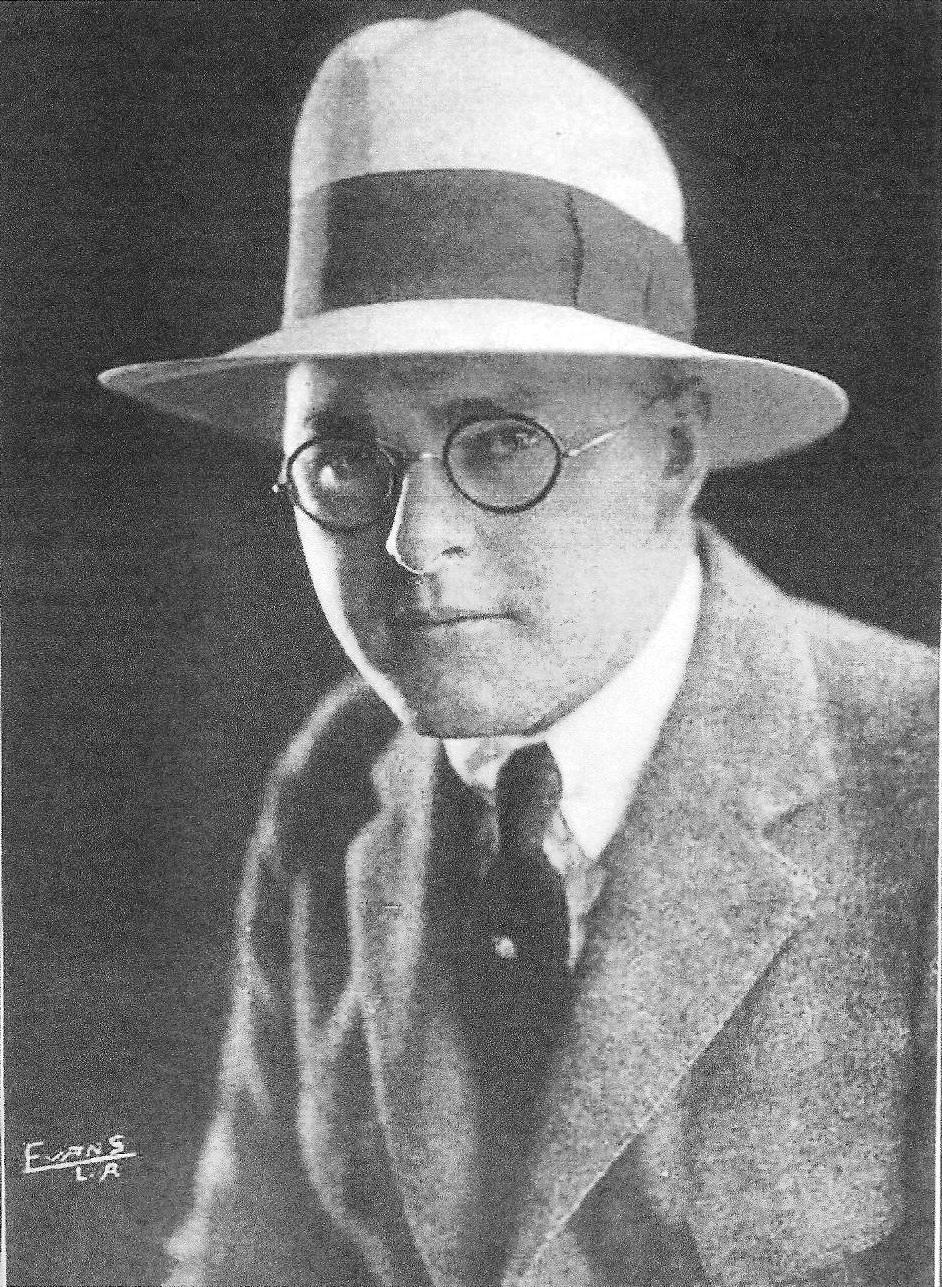
Director Reginald Barker has been credited for his innovations in filming The Italian.

Despite its occasional use of patronizing stereotypes, Bondanella concludes that Beppo "is represented with great dignity and even comic twists, making Beppo a far more lovable figure than one might expect." He concludes his chapter on the film with the following comment: "In short, what emerges from The Italian is an unusually complex view of tenement life and multiethnic immigration in America, and the film consequently retains its value not only as social history but also as a work of art."

In his book about the history of film editing, Don Fairservice credits The Italian's director, Reginald Barker, for his early use of editing to maintain story continuity and for his use of multidirectional camera positioning and variable framing to emphasize character development and psychological motivation rather than plot.

A review in DVD Talk concluded that Beban's performance was able to overcome the film's melodramatic premise:

"Beppo is a delightful character ... His rage after being robbed was another standout moment. The camera does a very tight closeup, one of the closest I can recall for a film from 1915, and his anger and fear are almost palatable. ... The ending of the film is also very dramatic and works well, without a false Hollywood happy ending ... It was nice to see the hardships of poverty portrayed without any easy answers, something that doesn't often happen."
