= The Flame of the Yukon (1926 film) =

1926 film

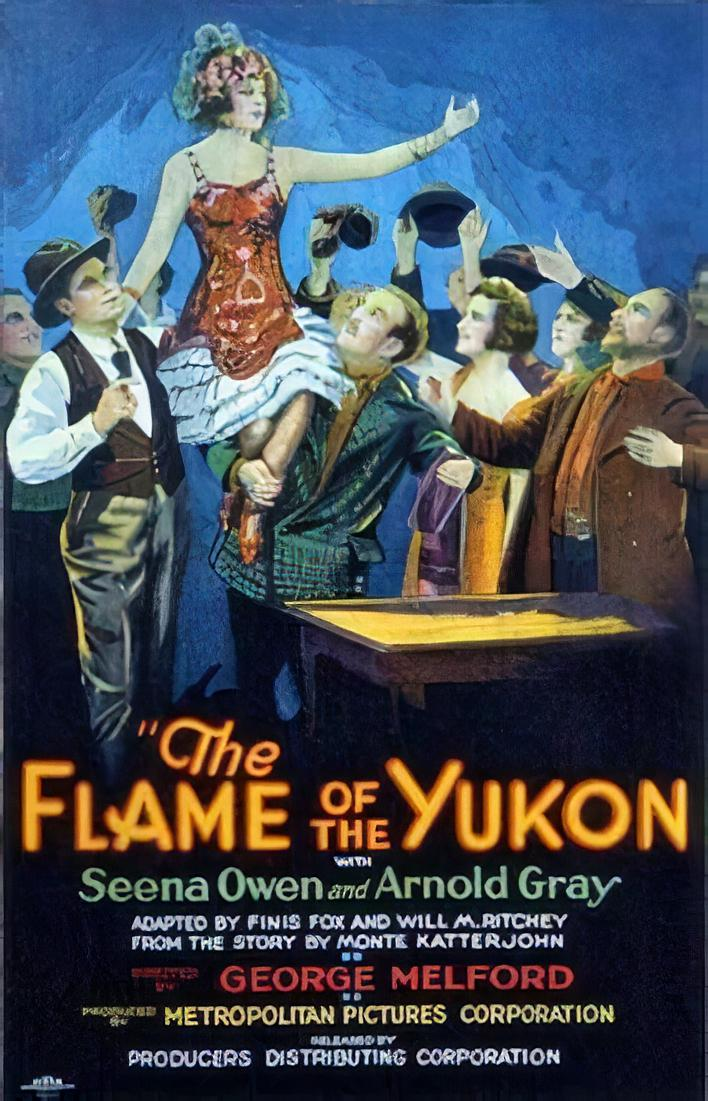
- Film poster
- Directed by: George Melford
- Written by: Finis Fox (adaptation); Will M. Ritchey (scenario)
- Story by: Monte Katterjohn
- Produced by: Metropolitan Pictures Corporation of California
- Starring: Seena Owen
- Cinematography: David Kesson; Joseph LaShelle (asst. camera)
- Distributed by: Producers Distributing Corporation (PDC)
- Release date: August 30, 1926
- Running time: 6 reels (1767.84 m or 5799 feet)
- Country: United States
- Language: Silent (English intertitles)

The Flame of the Yukon is a 1926 American silent Northwoods adventure drama film starring Seena Owen and directed by George Melford. The film is based on a story by Monte Katterjohn and was distributed by Cecil DeMille's Producers Distributing Corporation. The film is a remake of a 1917 film that had starred Dorothy Dalton, which survives at the Library of Congress.

== Cast ==
- Seena Owen as The Flame
- Arnold Gray as George Fowler
- Matthew Betz as Black Jack Hovey
- Jack McDonald as Sour Dough Joe
- Vadim Uraneff as Solo Jim
- Winifred Greenwood as Dolly

== Preservation ==
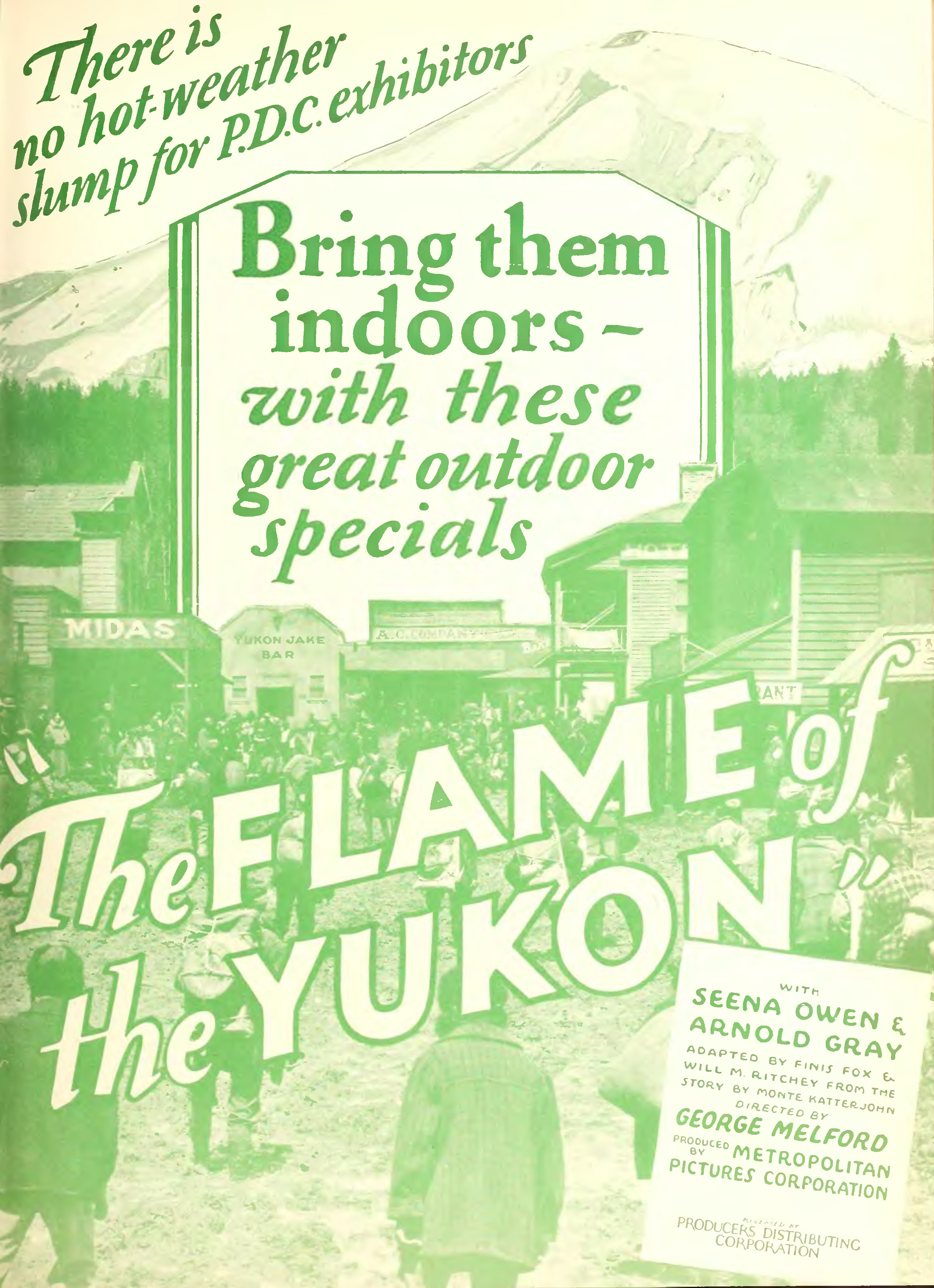
The Flame of the Yukon ad in Motion Picture News, 19265

The Flame of the Yukon, once thought to be lost, is preserved at the UCLA Film and Television Archive.
