= The Flame of the Yukon (1917 film) =

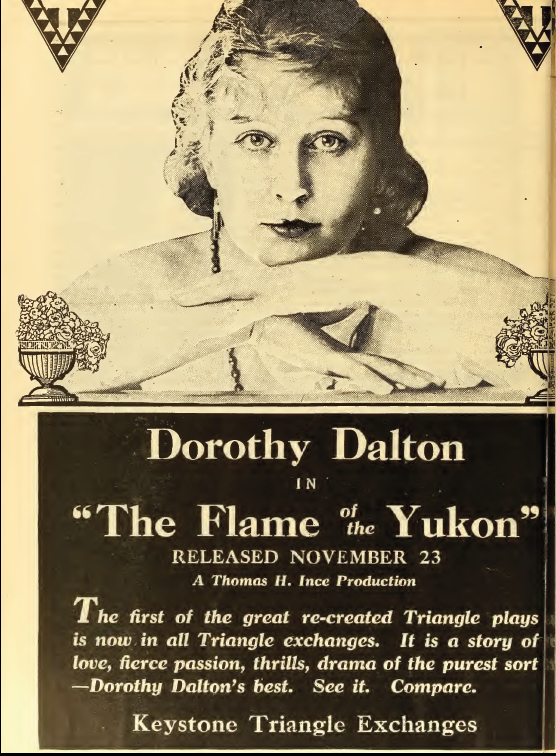
- ad for film
- Directed by: Charles Miller
- Written by: Monte Katterjohn
- Produced by: Thomas H. Ince
- Starring: Dorothy Dalton
- Cinematography: Clyde De Vinna
- Production company: Triangle Film Corporation
- Distributed by: Triangle Film Corporation
- Release date: July 1, 1917
- Running time: 5 reels
- Country: United States
- Language: Silent (English intertitles)

The Flame of the Yukon is an extant 1917 American silent drama film starring Dorothy Dalton and directed by Charles Miller. The film was produced and distributed by the Triangle Film Corporation.

It is a surviving Triangle film at the Library of Congress, Packard facility.

The story was remade in a 1926 film starring Seena Owen.

== Cast ==
- Dorothy Dalton - Ethel Evans / "The Flame"
- Melbourne MacDowell - Black Jack Hovey
- Kenneth Harlan - George Fowler
- Margaret Thompson - Dolly
- William Fairbanks - George Fowler (as Carl Ullman)
- May Palmer - Mrs. George Fowler

== Censorship ==
Before The Flame of the Yukon could be exhibited in Kansas, the Kansas Board of Review required the shortening of all drinking and gambling scenes in reel 6, and to reduce the fight scene.
