= Hell's Hinges =

1916 film

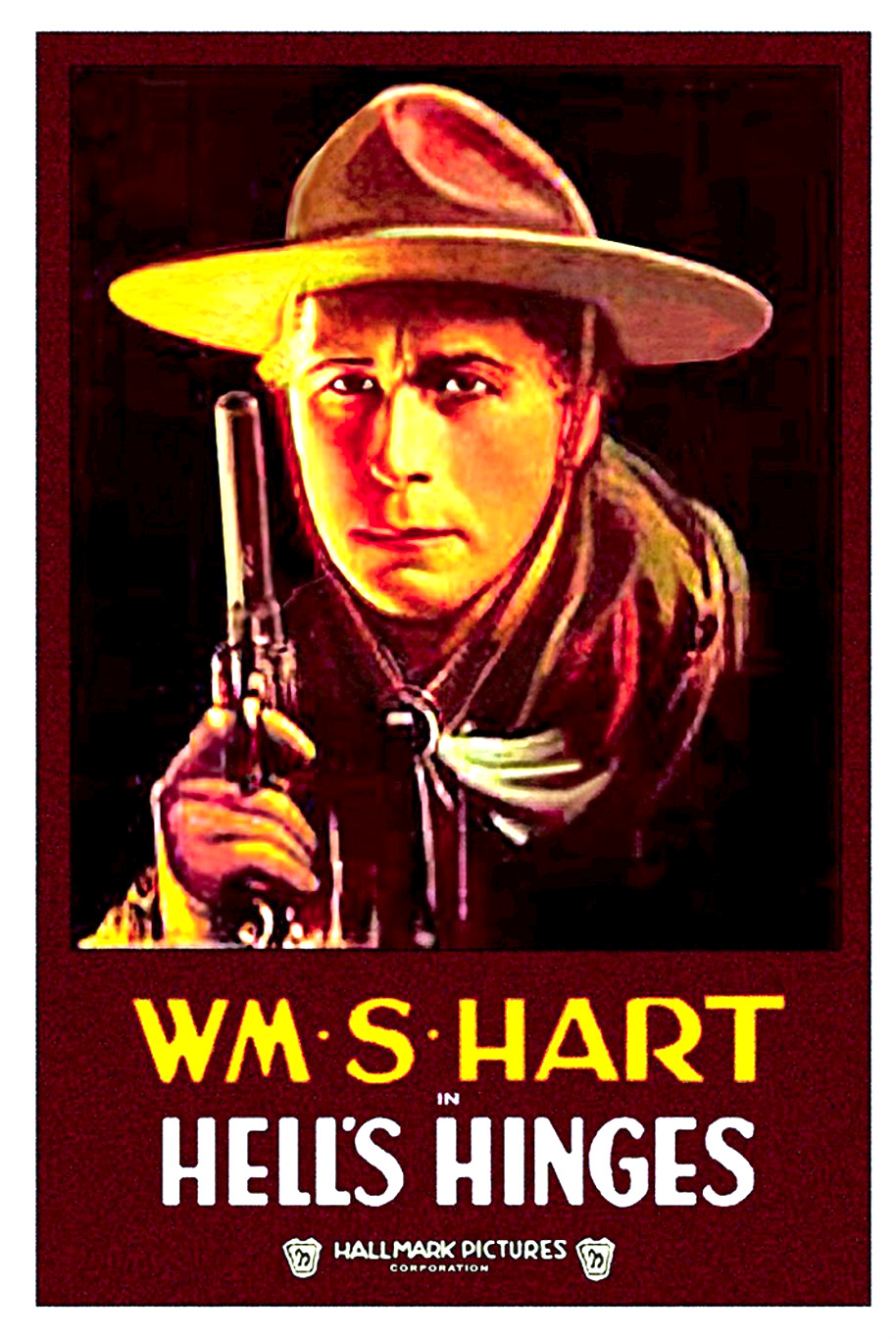
- Theatrical poster to Hell's Hinges
- Directed by: Charles Swickard; William S. Hart (uncredited); Clifford Smith (uncredited)
- Written by: C. Gardner Sullivan
- Produced by: Thomas H. Ince
- Starring: William S. Hart; Clara Williams
- Cinematography: Joseph H. August
- Music by: Victor Schertzinger (uncredited)
- Distributed by: Triangle Distributing Corporation
- Release date: March 5, 1916
- Running time: 64 minutes
- Country: United States
- Languages: Silent; English intertitles

Hell's Hinges is a 1916 American silent Western film starring William S. Hart and Clara Williams. Directed by Charles Swickard, William S. Hart and Clifford Smith, and produced by Thomas H. Ince, the screenplay was written by C. Gardner Sullivan.

In 1994, Hell's Hinges was selected for preservation in the National Film Registry of the Library of Congress, being deemed "culturally, historically, or aesthetically significant", and is considered by some to be one of the finest silent Westerns.

== Plot ==
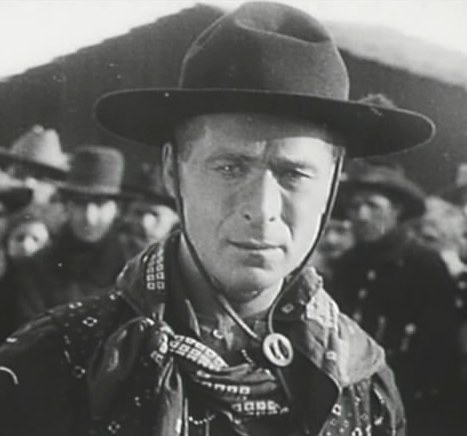
William S. Hart as Blaze Tracy in Hell's Hinges

Hell's Hinges tells the story of a weak-willed minister, Rev. Bob Henley, who comes to a wild and debauched frontier town with his sister, Faith. The owner of the saloon, Silk Miller, and his accomplices sense trouble and encourage the local rowdies to disrupt the attempts to evangelize the community. Hard-bitten gunman Blaze Tracy, the most dangerous man around, is, however, won over by the sincerity of Faith. He intervenes to expel the rowdies from the newly built church.

Silk adopts a new approach. He encourages the dance-hall girl, Dolly, to seduce Rev. Henley. She gets him drunk, and he spends the night in her room. The following morning the whole town learns of his fall from grace. Blaze rides out to find a doctor for the now near-demented minister.

The disgraced minister, having rapidly descended into alcoholism, is goaded into helping the rowdy element to burn down the church. The church-goers try to defend the church, and a gunfight erupts in which the minister is killed and the church set ablaze. Blaze returns too late to stop the destruction. In revenge, Blaze kills Silk and burns down the whole town, beginning with the saloon. He and Faith leave to start a new life.

== Cast ==
- William S. Hart as Blaze Tracy
- Clara Williams as Faith Henley
- Jack Standing as Rev. Robert Henley
- Alfred Hollingsworth as Silk Miller
- Robert McKim as a clergyman
- J. Frank Burke as Zeb Taylor
- Louise Glaum as Dolly
- Olin Francis as the bar tender (uncredited)
- John Gilbert as a rowdy cowboy (uncredited)
- Jean Hersholt as a rowdy townsman (uncredited)

== Production ==
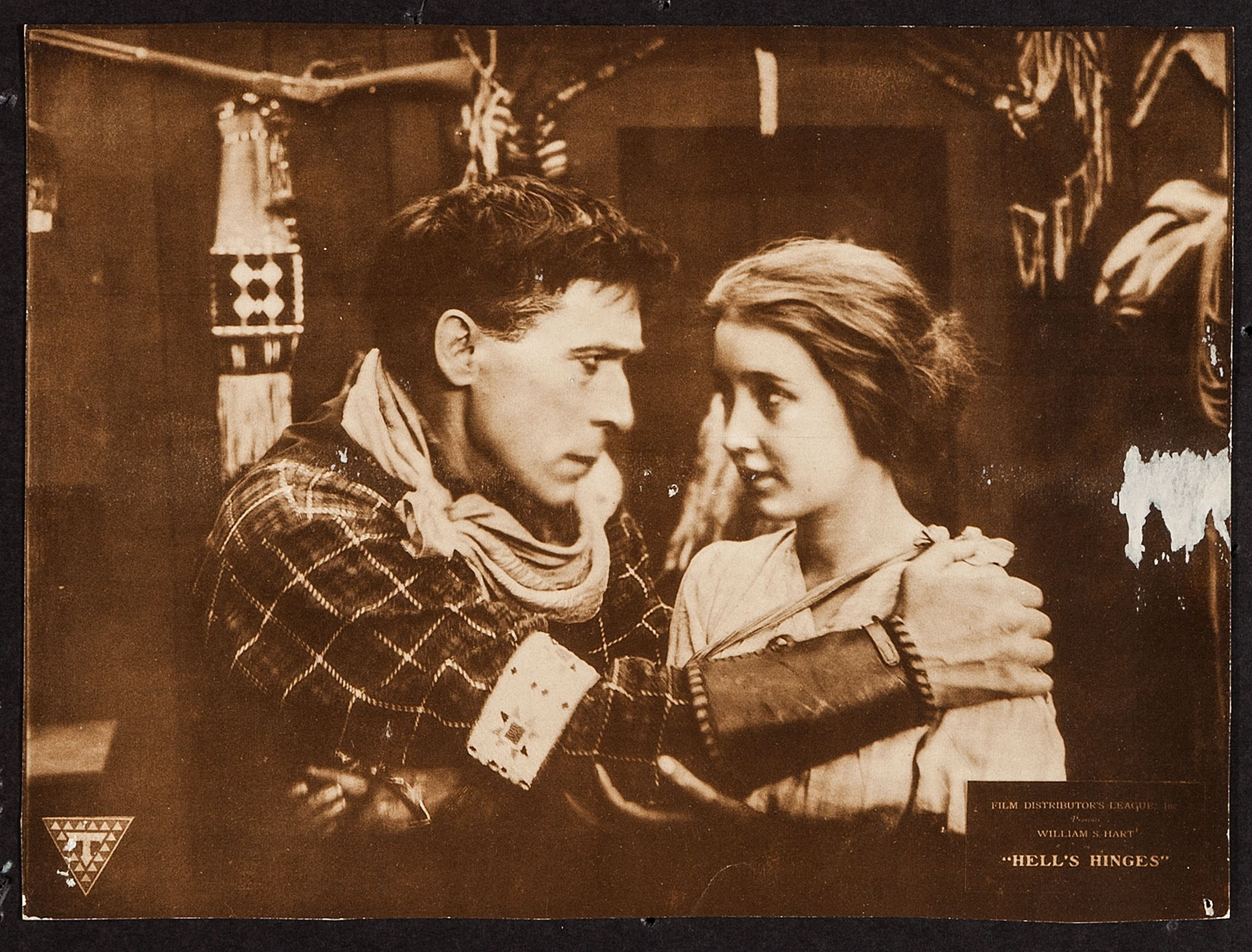
Hell's Hinges lobby card

The production companies were Kay-Bee Pictures and New York Motion Picture.

== Critical reception ==
=== Initial reviews in 1916 ===
Hell's Hinges

When Hell's Hinges was released, the reception of the film among New York critics was so positive that the producer bought space in newspapers around the country to reprint the reviews. The following are excerpts from those reviews:

- New York Telegraph: "Dramatic suspense and punch, coupled with artistic treatment, are the most conspicuous characteristics of 'Hell's Hinges' ... [A] swaggering, hard-drinking, fast-shooting, all-round 'bad' man, with good stuff under a rough exterior, furnished Mr. Hart with a vehicle in which his talents show to best advantage."
- New York American: "A well-balanced supporting cast, a lavish production and marked finesse in treatment combines to make 'Hell's Hinges' an unusual offering."
- New York Press: "Gunplay and religion lubricate 'Hell's Hinges' ... It is a film drama that combines all the elements that make for success ... Reckless riding, double-handed shooting from the hip, a dance hall of the Bret Harte description and, finally a conflagration that gives a truly Gehenna-like finish to the place known as Hell's Hinges ... No actor before the screen has been able to give as sincere and true a touch to the Westerner as Hart. He rides in a manner indigenous to the soil, he shoots with the real knack and he acts with that sense of artistry that hides the acting."
- New York Sun: "It depicts strikingly the storm and stress of existence in a Western town with a final scene of the shooting up of a gambling den, which aroused the spectators to a high degree of approval."
- New York Herald: "William S. Hart is beginning to typify certain things in the film world. He is ever stoical, slow to anger, but possessed of the powers of a hundred men when aroused. He is a big, bluff, wholesome fellow, whose ideas are frequently a little peculiar, and he goes about matters in exclusively his own way. But when the showdown arrives, depend upon it, William S. Hart will be found lined up on the side of righteousness. This week, for example, Hart is appearing at the Knickerbocker Theatre in 'Hell's Hinges. Hart has the opportunity to do some good riding, to carry a drunken minister on his back, to shoot the villain and some sub-villains, to set the town afire and to marry the minister's sister. The Kaiser himself has appeared in pictures and done less."
- New York Herald: "'Hell's Hinges,' one of those traditional places on the frontier of the Wild West, 'where there ain't no Ten Commandments and a man can get a thirst,' was pictured in the most lurid manner."

Grace Kingsley of the Los Angeles Times gave the actors high marks. She credited Hart with doing his "usual excellent work" and found Glaum to be "a really fascinating vampire." Kingsley paid special note to Standing's performance as the reverend, calling it "one of the most subtle, but at the same time of the most sincere bits of film acting of his entire career," a performance exhibiting "intelligence and imagination ... in the very highest degree." Kingsley found the film to be "marvelously well done" but took exception to the would-be folksy western dialect in the title cards:

C. Gardner Sullivan appears to have written 'Hell's Hinges' for the purpose of allowing us to look our fill on fire and fights. Certain it is the thing is marvelously well done. There is a burning dance hall with men and women entrapped, which fairly makes you gasp, and there is a 'beau-oo-tiful' free-for-all fight between the sheep and the goats of 'Hell's Hinges.' All this is lovely enough in its way to make for forgiveness of the dialect of the subtitles, a dialect which 'never was on land or sea.'

The title cards includes lines such as "When women like her say there is a God, there is one, and he sure must be worth trailin' with".

The publication Moving Picture World gave the film a mixed review:

... William S. Hart should try himself out in some other role, or, at least, in some more decided variation of story in which he quite regularly appears. Then, too, he might well be a little more human and less heroic with no loss of sympathy in the average audience. The old fashioned theatrical hero fails to win with a large percentage of the modern audience... Brilliant in subtitle, strong in treatment with occasional notes of true pathos, the marks of creative ability and sure craftmanship are there, but more of the material is outworn--the genius of author and director barely save it--and the fire scenes, elaborate as they are, finally cause interest to flag from too much repetition... The cast is without flaw.

The publication further noted that Ince "is at his best when holding close to revelations of the human mind and heart."

=== Later historical assessments ===
In September 1994, Hell's Hinges experienced a revival following a screening at the Film Center of the School of the Chicago Art Institute. At the time, the Chicago Tribune's movie critic, Michael Wilmington, called Hell's Hinges "Hart's acknowledged masterpiece," "perhaps the finest movie Western made before John Ford's 1939 Stagecoach," and "as emotionally powerful as any American Western film of the teens, except for the masterpieces of D. W. Griffith and Erich Von Stroheim."

Two months after the showing in Chicago and Wilmington's review, the film was selected for preservation in the United States National Film Registry by the Library of Congress as being "culturally, historically, or aesthetically significant."

In 1997, Film Comment published a review calling Hell's Hinges a "classic of its kind" and arguing that "to dismiss it casually as a western would be a mistake, for it more resembles The Atonement of Gosta Berling than it does Riders of the Purple Sage. The reviewer gave particular praise to Hart's directorial skill:

The camera placement here, the simple yet effective symbolism, and the flair for spectacle as in the brilliantly handled mob scenes where all of Inceville goes up in smoke, the real 'feel' of the old, dusty, unglamorised West, all should have earned Hart a reputation as one of the great directors. ... For the most part, 'Hell's Hinges' offers highpowered drama rather than traditional western action. ... Fine camerawork utilising long panoramic shots, excellent cutting and a sure control over the masses of extras fuse this into an episode of astonishing vigor. Hart, his assistant Cliff Smith, his writer Gardner Sullivan and cameraman Joe August were one of the sturdiest (and least appreciated) teams of craftsmen the cinema ever produced.

The film was given a centenary screening at the Museum of Modern Art in January 2016. In a capsule review for the occasion, The New Yorker's Richard Brody praised the film for its uncommon intensity: "The images are as direct and bare as the characters' emotions, and the harsh drama builds to a mad, apocalyptic climax of crime and revenge."

== In popular culture ==
In 2009, the band Caledonia Mission wrote a song for Esopus magazine inspired by the movie. The song is named "The Ballad of Blaze Tracy."
