= The Great Divide (1925 film) =

1925 film directed by Reginald Barker

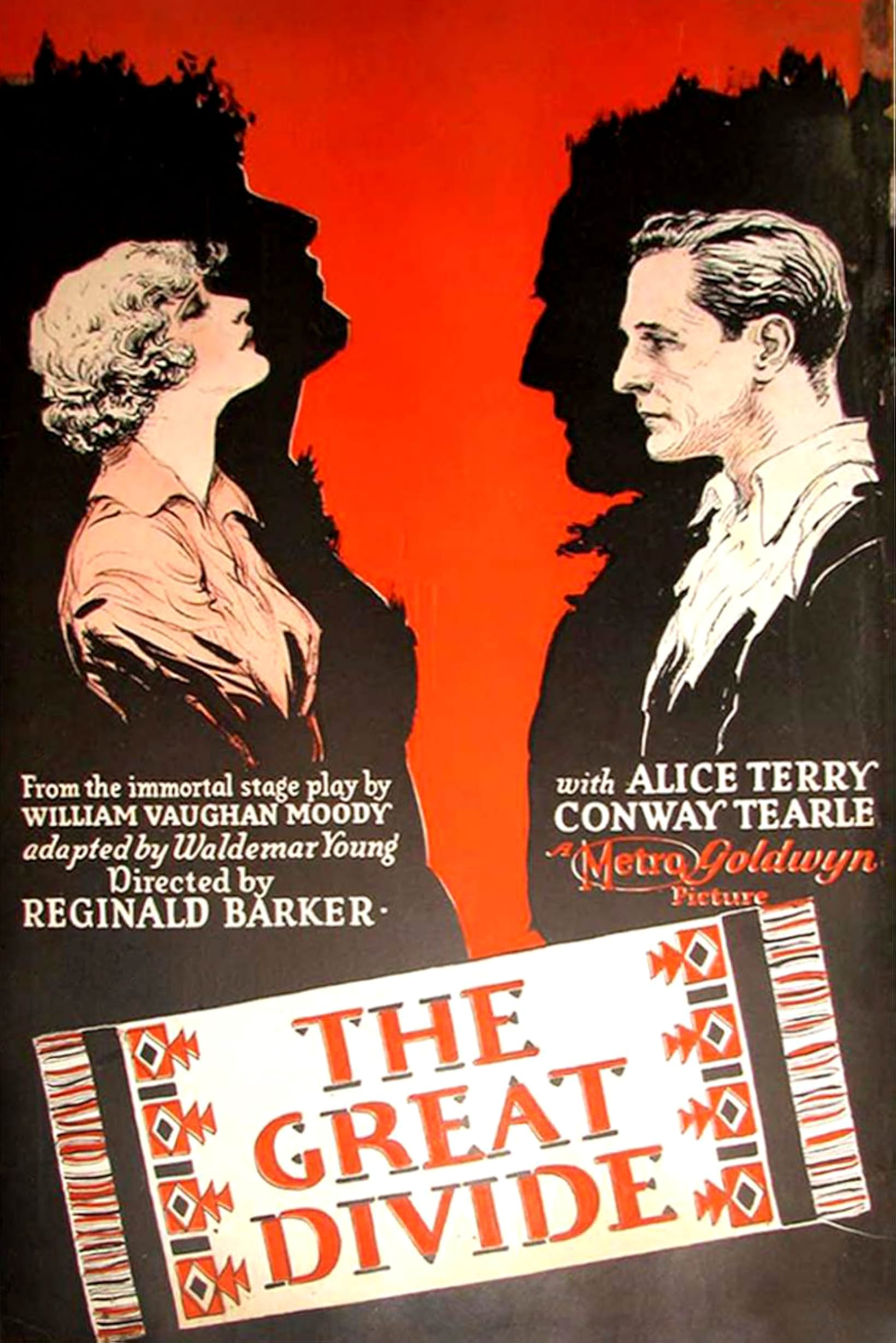
- Directed by: Reginald Barker
- Written by: Benjamin Glazer and Waldemar Young
- Based on: The Great Divide; 1906 play by William Vaughn Moody
- Produced by: Louis B. Mayer
- Starring: Alice Terry; Conway Tearle; Wallace Beery
- Cinematography: Percy Hilburn (*French)
- Edited by: Robert J. Kern
- Distributed by: Metro-Goldwyn-Mayer
- Release date: February 15, 1925
- Running time: 80 minutes; 7,811 feet
- Country: United States
- Language: Silent (English intertitles)
- Budget: $318,000
- Box office: $674,000

The Great Divide is a 1925 American silent drama film directed by Reginald Barker and produced and distributed by MGM. The film stars Alice Terry, Conway Tearle, and Wallace Beery. It is based on the William Vaughn Moody play, being the second of three film adaptations. The play had been made famous on the 1906 Broadway stage with Margaret Anglin, Henry Miller, Laura Hope Crews, and a pre-Griffith Henry B. Walthall in the principal parts.

== Plot ==
As described in a review in a film magazine, so anxious is finely reared Polly Jordan to go on a visit in the west that Polly persuades her brother Philip to take her. Dr. Winthrop Newbury promises to stay and protect her, but is called away due to an accident. Three rough intoxicated strangers returning from a fiesta see Ruth and led by Dutch break in to get her. In desperation, Ruth picks out one of the other strangers, Stephen Ghent, and offers him her life if he will save her from any assault, which he does. This sobers him up and, when he insists that she stand by her promise, she keeps her bargain, and he takes her away and they are married. He takes her to his valuable mine, which he has neglected, and he tries through his work and homelife to win her love, but she remains disgusted with him.

Her brother Philip trails them and visits, and although Ruth is ashamed of her situation, she makes it appear that all is OK. Seeing that something is wrong, Philip takes her back home. Stephen keeps away as long as he can, then goes to see her, but she repulses him and falls in a swoon.

At the risk of his life, Stephen crosses a flooded canyon to get the doctor, and their son is born. Still Ruth refuses to forgive him, even though others plead with her. Finally, she blurts out the truth of how they met and were married, and her brother a gun intending to shoot Stephen. Seeing him in danger awakens her love for him, resulting in a happy resolution.

== Cast ==
- Alice Terry as Ruth Jordan
- Conway Tearle as Stephen Ghent
- Wallace Beery as Dutch
- Huntley Gordon as Philip Jordan (credited as Huntly Gordon)
- Allan Forrest as Dr. Winthrop Newbury
- George Cooper a Shorty
- ZaSu Pitts as Polly Jordan
- William Orlamond as Lon

== Production ==
Much of The Great Divide was filmed in and around the Grand Canyon National Park, Arizona.

== Reception ==
The film made a profit of $115,000.

== Status ==
Previously thought lost, a copy was located in the Cinemateket-Svenska Filminstitutet in Stockholm.
