= Monte M. Katterjohn =

American screenwriter

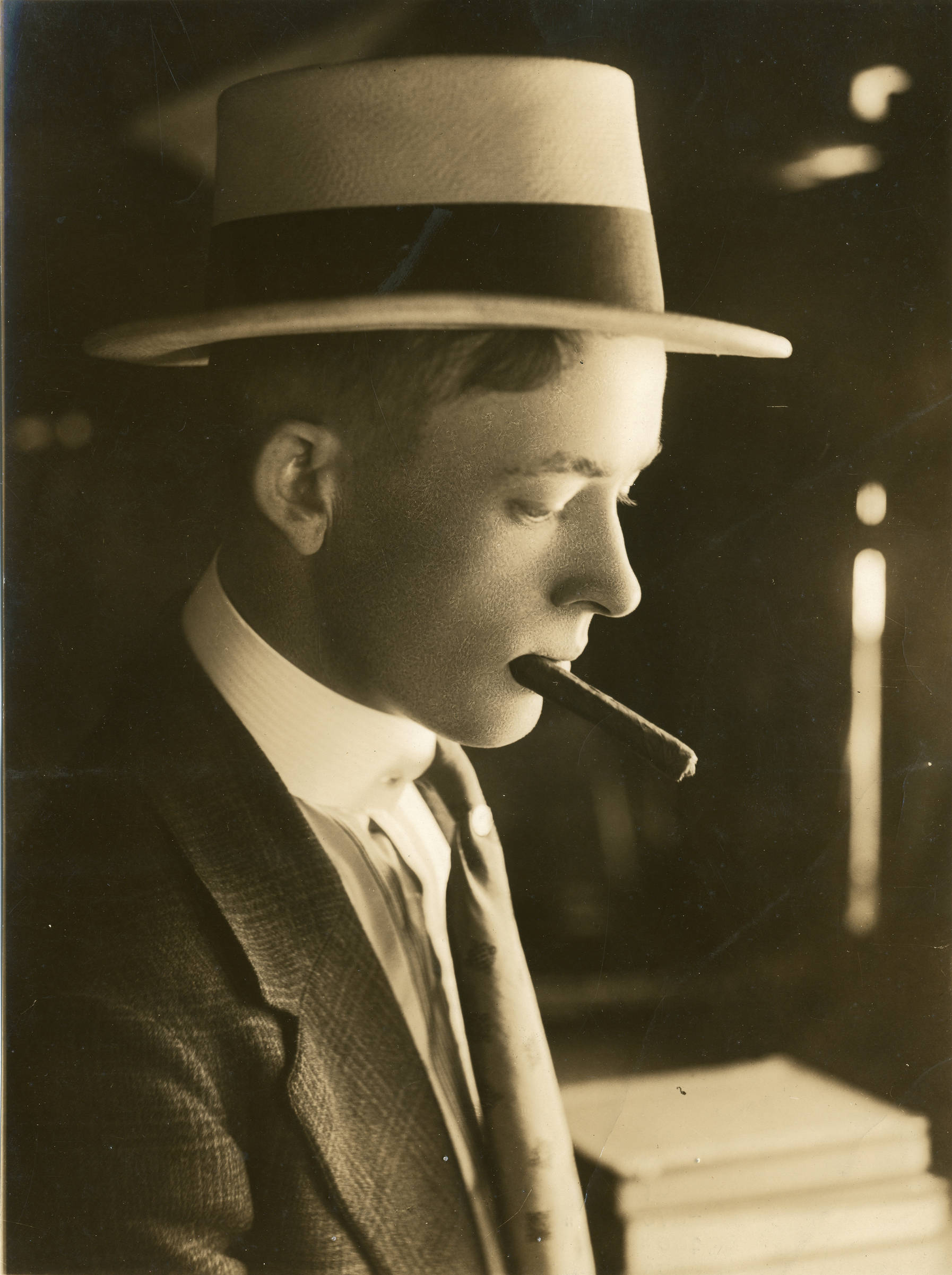
- Born: October 20, 1891; Boonville, Indiana, US
- Died: September 8, 1949 (aged 57); Evansville, Indiana, US
- Occupation: Screenwriter
- Years active: 1912–1931

Monte Melchior Katterjohn (October 20, 1891 – September 8, 1949) was an American screenwriter. He wrote the screenplays for 68 films between 1912 and 1931.

== Biography ==
Monte M. Katterjohn was born in Boonville, Indiana on October 20, 1891. He died from a heart attack in Evansville, Indiana on September 8, 1949.

== Selected filmography ==
- The Apostle of Vengeance (1916)
- The Gunfighter (1917)
- The Flame of the Yukon (1917)
- Golden Rule Kate (1917)
- Idolators (1917)
- Princess of the Dark (1917)
- Sweetheart of the Doomed (1917)
- The Weaker Sex (1917)
- Madam Who? (1918)
- Carmen of the Klondike (1918)
- Within the Cup (1918)
- An Alien Enemy (1918)
- Inside the Lines (1918)
- The Lord Loves the Irish (1919)
- Silk Husbands and Calico Wives (1920)
- The Great Moment (1921)
- The Sheik (1921)
- Cold Steel (1921)
- The Impossible Mrs. Bellew (1922)
- My American Wife (1922)
- Prodigal Daughters (1923)
- The White Desert (1925)
- The Broadway Boob (1926)
- A Social Celebrity (1926)
- Walking Back (1928)
- Paradise Island (1930)
- Daughter of the Dragon (1931)
