= Reginald Barker =

American film director (1886–1945)

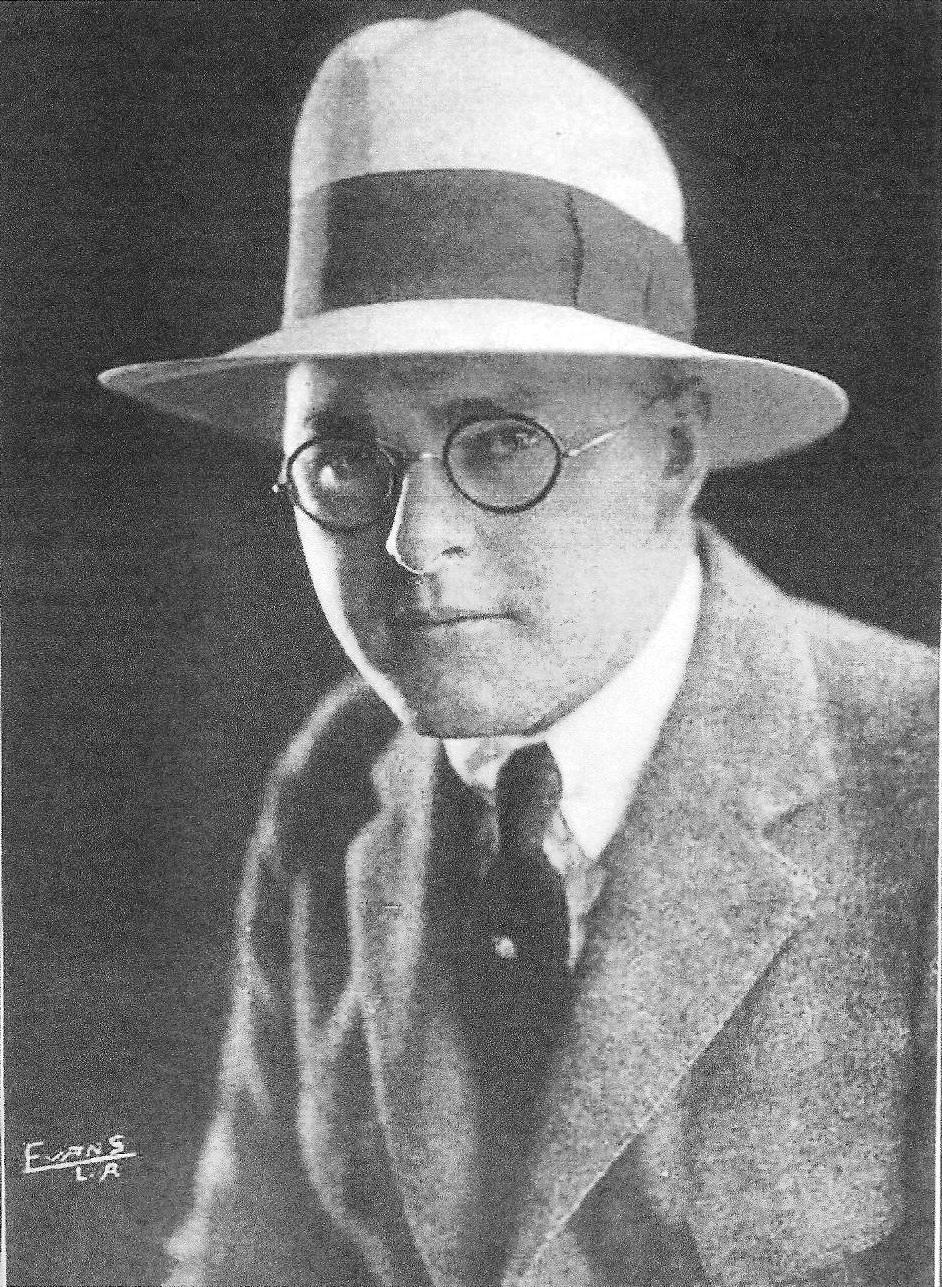
- Barker in 1920
- Born: Reginald C. Barker; April 2, 1886; Winnipeg, Manitoba, Canada
- Died: February 23, 1945 (aged 58); Pasadena, California, United States
- Burial place: Inglewood Park Cemetery
- Occupation: Film director
- Years active: 1912–1935

Reginald C. Barker (April 2, 1886 – February 23, 1945) was a pioneer film director.

== Biography ==
Born in Winnipeg, Manitoba, Canada, Barker's family moved to Scotland when he was an infant and then to the United States. Living in California, Barker wrote, produced, and acted in his first play known as Granna Uile at the age of sixteen following which he acted and handled stage manager duties with a traveling stock company. When he was eighteen he was the leading man and played in many stock companies. Then he worked with Robert Hilliard in the production of the play named A Fool There Was. At age nineteen, he went to New York City where he worked as a stage manager for Henry Miller. Barker made his Broadway acting debut in 1910 in the Shubert brothers production of "Mary Magdalene" written by Maurice Maeterlinck.

Fascinated by the fledgling film business, Barker soon joined the Bison Motion Pictures division of the New York Motion Picture Company. At the company's studio/ranch in California, he worked under film producer and screenwriter Thomas H. Ince. Acting was not Barker's forte and he trained as an assistant director until 1912 when he directed his first film, a twenty-minute western titled "On the Warpath" starring Art Acord. Barker went on to direct more than eighty films, including the acclaimed 1915 American Civil War drama The Coward. That same year he directed The Italian but because Thomas H. Ince was notorious for credit-grabbing, Barker originally went uncredited on this film. "The Italian" has been selected for preservation in the United States National Film Registry. The following year, with the United States still not involved in World War I, Barker co-directed the famous anti-war feature, Civilization.

During his career, Reginald Barker directed early stars such as Geraldine Farrar, William S. Hart, Sessue Hayakawa, Gladys Brockwell, Hoot Gibson, Willard Mack, and Myrna Loy. In his first sound film (no talking sequences), "The Toilers" (1928) he directed Douglas Fairbanks Jr. Barker made his last film in 1935. Titled "The Healer," it starred Ralph Bellamy, Karen Morley and Mickey Rooney.

Reginald Barker retired to Pasadena, California where he and his wife operated a gift shop until his death from a heart attack in 1945. He is interred in the Inglewood Park Cemetery in Inglewood, California.

== Partial filmography ==
=== Director ===
- City of Darkness (1914)
- The Wrath of the Gods (1914)
- The Typhoon (1914)
- The Bargain (1914)
- The Devil (1915)
- The Coward (1915)
- The Italian (1915)
- On The Night Stage (1915)
- The Reward (1915)
- The Aryan (1916)
- Civilization (1916)
- The Iced Bullet (1917)
- Sweetheart of the Doomed (1917)
- Paws of the Bear (1917)
- The Hell Cat (1918)
- The Turn of the Wheel (1918)
- Carmen of the Klondike (1918)
- Shackled (1918)
- Shadows (1919)
- The Brand (1919)
- The Rustlers (1919)
- Dangerous Days (1920)
- The Woman and the Puppet (1920)
- Godless Men (1920)
- The Poverty of Riches (1921)
- The Old Nest (1921)
- The Storm (1922)
- Hearts Aflame (1923)
- The Eternal Struggle (1923)
- Broken Barriers (1924)
- The Dixie Handicap (1924)
- The Great Divide (1925)
- When the Door Opened (1925)
- The White Desert (1925)
- The Flaming Forest (1926)
- The Frontiersman (1927)
- Body and Soul (1927)
- The Toilers (1928)
- New Orleans (1929)
- Mississippi Gambler (1929)
- Seven Keys to Baldpate (1929)
- The Rainbow (1929)
- The Great Divide (1929)
- Hide-Out (1930)
- The Moonstone (1934)
- Forbidden Heaven (1935)
- Women Must Dress (1935)
- The Healer (1935)

=== Actor ===
- The Vampire (1915)
- The Iced Bullet (1917) – Himself
- Ben-Hur (1925) – Chariot Race Spectator (uncredited) (final film role)

== See also ==
- 1886 in film
