= William Vaughn Moody =

American dramatist (1869–1910)

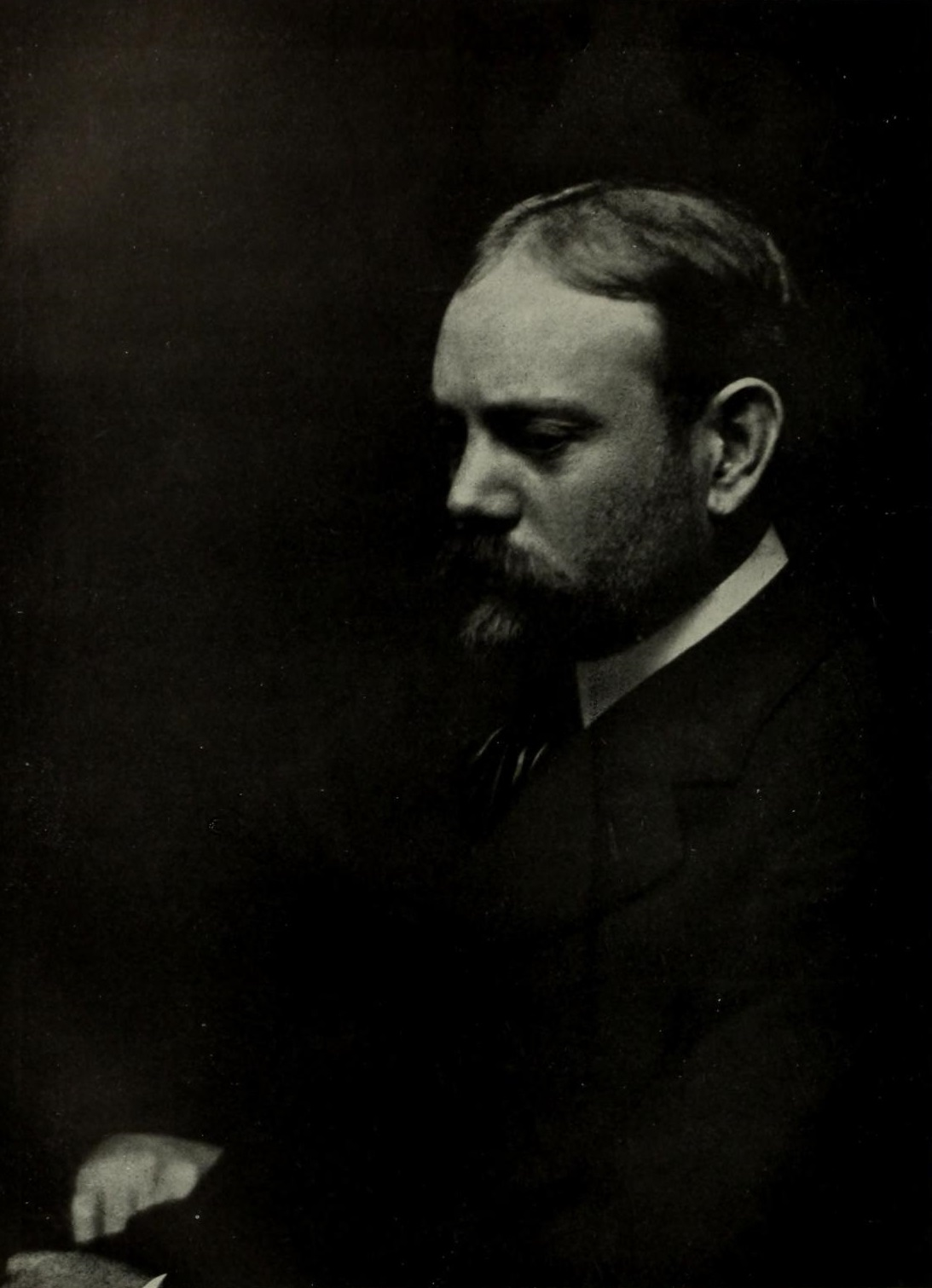
- Portrait of William Vaughn Moody, by De W.C. Ward.
- Born: July 8, 1869; Spencer, Indiana
- Died: October 17, 1910 (aged 41); Colorado Springs, Colorado
- Occupations: Dramatist, poet

Signature
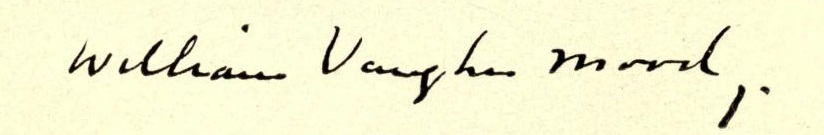

William Vaughn Moody (July 8, 1869 – October 17, 1910) was an American dramatist and poet. Moody was author of The Great Divide, first presented under the title of The Sabine Woman at the Garrick Theatre in Chicago on April 12, 1906, and then on Broadway at the Princess Theatre, running for 238 performances from October 3, 1906, to March 24, 1907. His poetic dramas are The Masque of Judgment (1900), The Fire Bringer (1904), and The Death of Eve (left undone at his death). His best-known poem is "An Ode in Time of Hesitation," on the Spanish-American War; others include "Gloucester Moor," "On a Soldier Fallen in the Philippines," "The Brute," "Harmonics" (his only sonnet), "Until the Troubling of the Waters," "The Departure," "How the Mead-Slave Was Set Free," "The Daguerreotype," and "The Death of Eve." His poems everywhere bespeak the social conscience of the progressive era (1893–1916) in which he spent his foreshortened life. In style they evoke a mastery of the verse-craft of his time and also the reach and depth derived from his intensive studies of Milton and of Greek tragedy.

== Biography ==
Born at Spencer, Indiana, his parents died while he was a boy, and he had to work to help support himself while he completed his education. After attending New Albany High School he went on to Harvard University, where he was awarded the George B. Sohier Prize for literature and earned an A.B. in 1893 and an A.M. in 1894.

He was a classmate of W. E. B. Du Bois, who quoted from his play The Fire-Bringer in a speech in honor of Carter G. Woodson.

He taught English at Harvard and Radcliffe until 1895, when he became first an instructor at the University of Chicago and then, from 1901 to 1907, assistant professor of English and rhetoric there. He received the degree of Litt.D. from Yale in 1908, and was a member of the American Academy of Arts and Letters. Among his close friends were the historian Ferdinand Schevill, the editor Norman Hapgood, the author, academic, activist and diplomat Robert Morss Lovett, and the poet Trumbull Stickney. After a time he resigned his teaching post at the University of Chicago, commenting (as his friend John Matthews Manly quotes him in the introduction to the posthumous collection of his works), "I cannot do it; I feel that at every lecture I slay a poet."

In 1899, he met the businesswoman Harriet Converse. They became friends over their mutual interests in poetry and spirituality, and "[e]ach found an idealization of gender in the other". They married in 1909, and remained together until William's death of brain cancer in 1910 in Colorado Springs, aged 41.

== Works ==
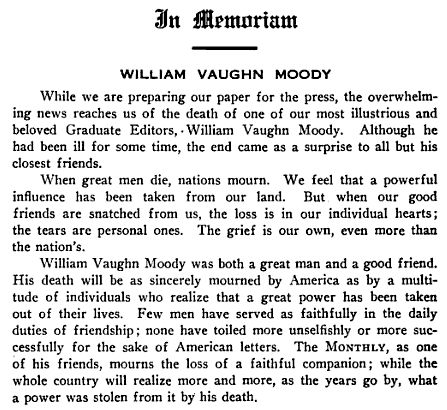
Tribute to W.V. Moody in The Harvard Monthly Vol 51 (1910)

- The Complete Poetical Works of John Milton (editor; 1899, Cambridge)
- The Masque of Judgment (1900)
- Poems (1901)
- The Fire-Bringer (1904), intended as the first member of a trilogy on the Promethean theme, of which The Masque of Judgment, already published, was the second member
- The Great Divide (1906), prose drama, especially successful on the stage.
- The Faith Healer (1909), prose drama, very successful on the stage
- A First View of English and American Literature (compiler with Robert M. Lovett; 1902)
- The Poems of Trumbull Stickney (editor with George Cabot Lodge and John Ellerton Lodge; 1905)

His complete works, including The Death of Eve, a fragment of the third member of the proposed trilogy mentioned above, were edited with an introduction by John M. Manly (1912).

== See also ==
- The Harvard Monthly
