= Tom Mix filmography =

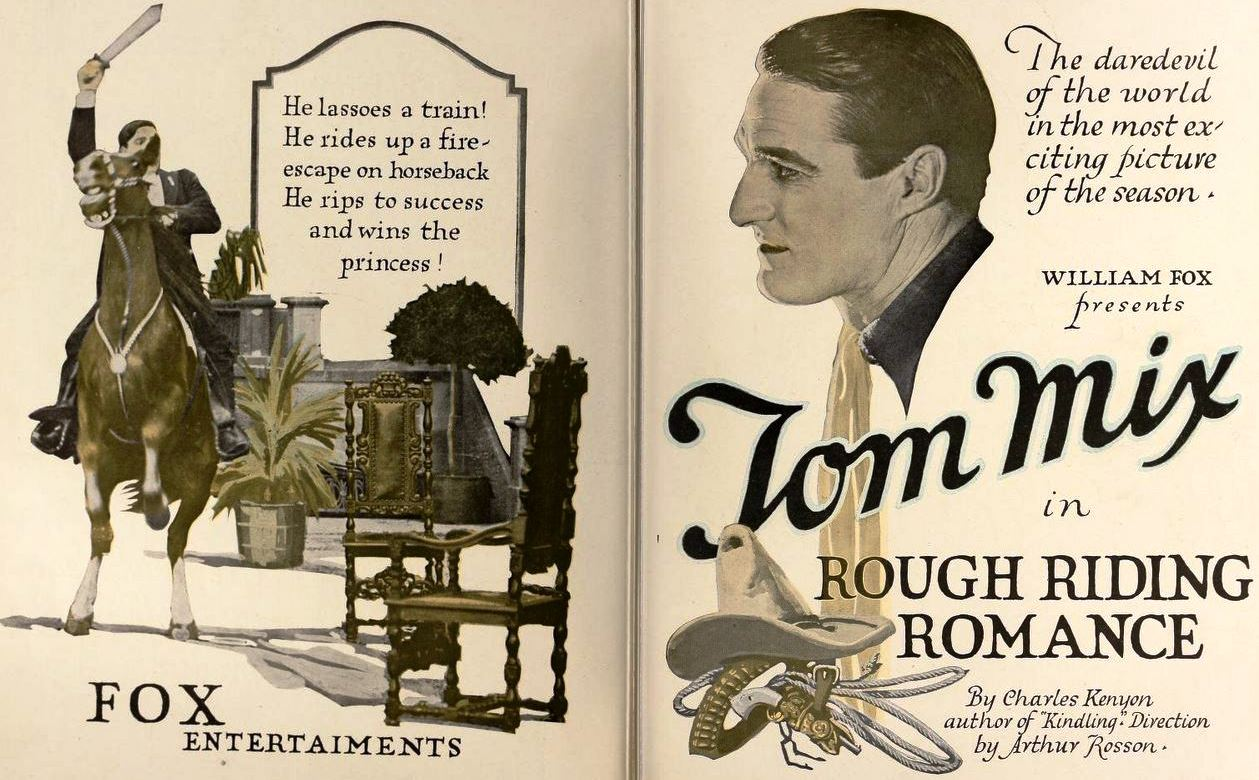
Tom Mix in an ad for his 1919 feature Rough Riding Romance.

Tom Mix (1880–1940) was an American motion picture actor, director, and writer whose career spanned from 1910 to 1935. During this time he appeared in 270 films and established himself as the screen's most popular cowboy star. Mix's flair for showmanship set the standard for later cowboy heroes such as Gene Autry and Roy Rogers. His horse Tony also became a celebrity who received his own fan mail.

Born in Pennsylvania, Mix served in the United States Army before moving to the Oklahoma Territory in 1902. Three years later, after working as a physical fitness instructor, bartender, and peace officer, he was hired as a full-time cowboy for the Miller Brothers 101 Ranch. Soon after, Mix established himself as the star attraction of the Millers' Wild West Show. In early 1910 Mix agreed to work as an actor and wrangler for the Selig Polyscope Company. Mix alternated between working in films and in Wild West shows until 1913 when he went into the film business full-time. The following year he established his own production unit and became a director and writer as well as an actor. His films for Selig were usually one and two-reel shorts that initially emphasized humor in the tradition of Will Rogers but eventually moved into action-oriented stories that displayed Mix's riding and stunting prowess.

In 1917 Mix left Selig and signed a contract with the Fox Film Corporation. His earliest films for them were two-reel shorts but within a year he switched to features. During his peak period in the 1920s Mix appeared in action-packed westerns filled with fights and chases which often showed him doing his own stunt work. His films were also known for their location work in places such as Arizona's Grand Canyon and Colorado's Royal Gorge. Among the notable directors that he worked with during this time were John Ford, Sidney Franklin, Jack Conway, George Marshall, and Roy William Neill. His leading ladies included Louella Maxam, Colleen Moore, Esther Ralston, Laura La Plante, Billie Dove and Clara Bow. In 1928, after eleven years and 86 films with Fox, Mix moved to FBO Pictures for a series of five films. With the advent of sound, Mix abandoned his film career and returned to working in Wild West shows. He came back to films in 1932 for a series of nine sound features for Universal. In 1935, he appeared in his final film, a 15-chapter serial for Mascot Pictures. Mix died in an automobile accident in Arizona five years later.

On February 8, 1960, Mix was awarded a star on the Hollywood Walk of Fame. In 1998, Mix's film Sky High was added to the National Film Registry by the Library of Congress.

== Selig Polyscope Company ==
In 1910, Will A. Dickey, owner of the Circle D Ranch Wild West Show and Indian Congress, signed a deal to provide stock and wranglers for the Selig motion picture company. Dickey had seen Mix perform with the Miller Brothers 101 Ranch Wild West Show and asked him if he would be interested in appearing in films. Mix agreed and soon after joined the Selig unit in Flemington, Missouri. Mix's earliest films were made as part of one of Selig's traveling units. Location work for these films was done in Missouri and Oklahoma while at least one film was made in Chicago. Otis Turner, the director of these films, was impressed with Mix's screen image and wanted to keep him working as a film actor. Mix, however, was not interested in remaining in films and signed with Zack Mulhall's Wild West Show to help organize the Appalachian Exposition in Knoxville, Tennessee, which was scheduled to run in October and November. After this Mix rejoined the Miller Brothers 101 Ranch Show.

In the spring of 1911 Mix left the Miller Brothers 101 Ranch Show and resumed his career as an actor with the Selig Polyscope Company. Early in 1912 Mix left the film industry and joined Guy Weadick, one of his former 101 Ranch associates, to stage the first Calgary Stampede in Alberta, Canada. After this Mix toured Canada with the Buffalo Ranch Wild West Show. Following the show's closure Mix returned to Dewey, Oklahoma and accepted the position of night marshal. All of Mix's 1912 films are one-reel shorts directed by Otis Turner.

In January 1913 Mix accepted an offer from Selig to return to acting in films as part of a production unit in Prescott, Arizona, until the supervision of actor-director William Duncan. During his time with this unit Duncan persuaded Mix to write some of the scenarios. All of Mix's 1913 films were directed by Duncan and, except where noted, are one-reel shorts. The majority of these films co-starred Myrtle Stedman and Lester Cuneo. The last films that Mix made with Duncan were released in early 1914. By that time Mix had been reassigned work with Colin Campbell, one of Selig's top directors, to appear in films produced in Truckee, California. These films were largely two or three reels in length and attracting more attention than Selig's average releases. Later in 1914 Selig gave Mix his own unit, which allowed him to write, direct and star in films made in Glendale, California.

Mix returned to Arizona in 1915. The Selig Company began to experience a decline in its profits around this time, due in part to World War I cutting off its foreign market. As a result, Selig began trimming its production schedule. All films were directed by Mix and, except where noted, are one-reel shorts. In 1916 Mix moved to Las Vegas, New Mexico, which, at the time, was the last remaining open range in the West. In June 1916 he moved again, this time back to Glendale. With pressure from Selig to reduce costs in his unit, Mix began searching for a new producer. By the end of the year he had signed with the Fox Film Corporation. Mix's final films with Selig were released in early 1917.

All of Mix's Selig films are one-reel shorts except where noted. Most of these films are now lost. Those that are known to survive are listed in the notes section.

Release date	Title	Role	Notes	Ref
October 21, 1909	The Cowboy Millionaire	Unknown role	Directed by Francis Boggs and Otis Turner; print survives	
October 25, 1909	Briton and Boer	Unknown role	Directed by William Selig	
November 18, 1909	Up San Juan Hill	Unknown role		
November 25, 1909	On the Little Big Horn; or, Custer's Last Stand	Unknown role	Directed by Francis Boggs	
December 2, 1909	An Indian Wife's Devotion	Unknown role	Split-reel with A Million Dollar Mix-up	
June 2, 1910	Trimming of Paradise Gulch	One of the Paradise Gulch Cowboys	Directed by Otis Turner	
June 9, 1910	The Range Riders	County Sheriff	Directed by Otis Turner; featuring Myrtle Stedman	
July 4, 1910	Go West, Young Woman, Go West	Unknown role		
July 7, 1910	The Way of the Red Man	Unknown role		
July 28, 1910	The Cowboy's Stratagem	Unknown role		
August 9, 1910	Ranch Life in the Great South-West	Unknown role		
1910	[Unknown film]	Unknown role	According to Mix's wife Olive, she and her husband appeared in a dramatic film whose title has not been determined. Also according to her the cast featured Margarita Fischer and Wallace Reid	
October 10, 1910	Two Boys in Blue	Unknown role		
May 11, 1911	Back to the Primitive	Unknown role	Directed by Otis Turner; co-stars Kathlyn Williams	
June 1, 1911	The Rose of Old St. Augustine	Black Hawk, a Seminole Indian	Directed by Otis Turner; co-stars Kathlyn Williams	
July 13, 1911	Captain Kate	The good native	Directed by Otis Turner; co-stars Kathlyn Williams	
July 29, 1911	Saved by the Pony Express	The Pony Express rider	Prints survive	
August 28, 1911	Life on the Border	Indian chief	Directed by Otis Turner; co-stars Kathlyn Williams	
September 12, 1911	Dad's Girls	Tom Rolston, the gambler	Directed by Otis Turner; co-stars Kathlyn Williams and Oliver Stokes	
October 10, 1911	Told in Colorado	Bill Higgins, a miner	Co-stars William Duncan and Myrtle Stedman	
October 24, 1911	Why the Sheriff Is a Bachelor	Joe Davis, the sheriff	Co-stars William Duncan and Myrtle Stedman	
November 4, 1911	Western Hearts	Sheriff Long		
November 25, 1911	The Tell-Tale Knife	Tom Mason, a rustler	Directed by William Duncan; co-stars Duncan and Myrtle Stedman	
December 12, 1911	A Romance of the Rio Grande	Tom Wilson, a Texas Ranger	Directed by Otis Turner; co-stars William Duncan and Myrtle Stedman	
December 26, 1911	The Bully of Bingo Gulch	Pop Lynd, owner of the Bingo Gulch Ranch	Directed by Otis Turner; co-stars William Duncan and Myrtle Stedman	
January 16, 1912	A Cowboy's Best Girl	Bull Stokes, a rough cowboy	Co-stars William Duncan, Myrtle Stedman, and Olive Stokes	
January 30, 1912	The Scapegoat	Tom Mason, the scapegoat	Co-stars William Duncan, Myrtle Stedman, and Olive Stokes	
February 29, 1912	The 'Diamond S' Ranch	Unknown role	Co-stars Olive Stokes	
March 12, 1913	Juggling with Fate	Andrews, the marshall / Morgan, the outlaw	Mix as a marshall who also works as a masked bandit	
March 19, 1913	The Sheriff of Yavapai County	"Apache Frank", a crooked gambler		
March 26, 1913	The Life Timer	Sheriff	Half-reel	
April 9, 1913	The Shotgun Man and the Stage Driver	The Stage Driver		
April 28, 1913	The Mail Order Suit	Slim		
May 19, 1913	His Father's Deputy	Tom Carter, the sheriff		
May 26, 1913	Religion and Gun Practice	Kill Kullen		
June 4, 1913	The Law and the Outlaw	"Dakota" Wilson	Two reels; scenario by Mix and J. Edward Hungerford	
June 17, 1913	Taming a Tenderfoot	Bud Morris		
June 24, 1913	The Marshall's Capture	The half-breed		
July 4, 1913	Sallie's Sure Shot	"Injun" Sam		
July 10, 1913	Made a Coward	Pete		
July 14, 1913	The Only Chance	Engineer		
July 30, 1913	The Taming of Texas Pete	The half-breed		
August 7, 1913	The Stolen Moccasins	Swift-foot		
August 14, 1913	An Apache's Gratitude	Tonto		
August 22, 1913	The Good Indian	The Indian		
August 27, 1913	How Betty Made Good	The foreman		
September 4, 1913	Howlin' Jones	Robledo		
September 19, 1913	The Rejected Lover's Luck	The Indian		
October 1, 1913	The Cattle Thief's Escape	Pete Becker, the half-breed	Half-reel	
October 9, 1913	Saved from the Vigilantes	Square Beasley		
October 14, 1913	The Silver Grindstone	Saloon keeper		
October 21, 1913	Dishwash Dick's Counterfeit	The rustler	Half-reel	
October 29, 1913	A Muddle in Horse Thieves	The horse thief	Half-reel	
November 7, 1913	The Schoolmarm's Shooting Match	Gray	Half-reel	
November 13, 1913	The Child of the Prairies	Fred Watson	Two reels; scenario by Mix	
November 17, 1913	The Escape of Jim Dolan	Jim Dolan	Two reels; scenario by Mix	
November 13, 1913	The Sheriff and the Rustler	The rustler	Two reels; scenario by Mix	
November 26, 1913	Cupid in the Cow Camp	Bud Reynolds		
December 11, 1913	Physical Culture on the Quarter Circle V Bar	Williams		
December 17, 1913	Buster's Little Game	Pete Wilson		
December 23, 1913	Mother Love vs. Gold	Pete Jackson		
January 7, 1914	By Unseen Hand	Chief Jackson	Directed by William Duncan	
January 22, 1914	A Friend in Need	The foreman	One reel; written and directed by William Duncan	
February 5, 1914	The Little Sister	A prospector	Directed by William Duncan	
June 28, 1914	In Defiance of the Law	Corporal Nome	Three reels; directed by Colin Campbell; co-stars Wheeler Oakman and Bessie Eyton; based on a novel by James Oliver Curwood	
July 13, 1914	The Wilderness Mail	The outlaw	Two reels; directed by Colin Campbell; co-stars Wheeler Oakman and Bessie Eyton; story by James Oliver Curwood	
July 31, 1914	When the Cook Fell Ill	Chip	Directed by Colin Campbell; co-stars Wheeler Oakman	
August 13, 1914	Etienne of the Glad Heart	Peter	Two reels; directed by Colin Campbell; co-stars Wheeler Oakman and Bessie Eyton	
August 24, 1914	The White Mouse	Sergeant Brokaw	Two reels; directed by Colin Campbell; co-stars Wheeler Oakman and Bessie Eyton; story by James Oliver Curwood	
August 29, 1914	Chip of the Flying U	Chip	Three reels; directed by Colin Campbell; co-stars Kathlyn Williams and Wheeler Oakman	
September 7, 1914	When the West Was Young	Indian chief	Two reels; directed by Colin Campbell; co-stars Wheeler Oakman and Bessie Eyton	
September 28, 1914	The Going of the White Swan	Unknown role	Two reels; directed by Colin Campbell; co-stars Wheeler Oakman and Bessie Eyton	
September 29, 1914	The Real Thing in Cowboys	Wallace Carey	Directed by Mix	
October 5, 1914	The Moving Picture Cowboy	Luke Barnes	Two reels; co-stars Lester Cuneo; written and directed by Mix	
October 6, 1914	The Way of the Redman	The Redman	Co-stars Leo Maloney; written and directed by Mix	
October 13, 1914	The Mexican	The Mexican	Co-stars Leo Maloney; directed by Mix	
October 24, 1914	Jimmy Hayes and Muriel	Jimmy Hayes	Co-stars Leo Maloney; directed by Mix	
October 27, 1914	Why the Sheriff Is a Bachelor	The Sheriff	Co-stars Leo Maloney; written and directed by Mix	
November 3, 1914	The Tell-Tale Knife	Tom Mason	Co-stars Leo Maloney and Hoot Gibson; written and directed by Mix	
November 10, 1914	The Ranger's Romance	Ranger	One reel; written and directed by Mix	
November 17, 1914	The Sheriff's Reward	The Sheriff	Co-stars Leo Maloney; written and directed by Mix	
November 24, 1914	The Scapegoat	Tom Jackson, the scapegoat	Co-stars Leo Maloney; written and directed by Mix	
November 30, 1914	In the Days of the Thundering Herd	Tom Mingle	Five reels; Mix's first feature; directed by Colin Campbell; co-stars Bessie Eyton and Wheeler Oakman; possibly made before Mix started working for his own unit; survives complete: AFA / LC / GEH	
December 1, 1914	The Rival Stage Lines	Harding Martin	Co-stars Leo Maloney; directed by Mix	
December 8, 1914	Saved by a Watch	Tom	Co-stars Leo Maloney; written and directed by Mix	
December 15, 1914	The Man from the East	Tom Bates	Co-stars Leo Maloney and Hoot Gibson; written and directed by Mix	
December 29, 1914	Cactus Jake, Heart-Breaker	Bill	Co-stars Leo Maloney; directed by Mix	
January 5, 1915	A Militant Schoolma'am	—N/a	Stars Leo Maloney; Mix directed but does not appear	
January 12, 1915	Harold's Bad Man	Unknown role		
January 19, 1915	Cactus Jim's Shop Girl	Cactus Jim	Prints survive	
January 26, 1915	The Grizzly Gulch Chariot Race	Unknown role		
January 2, 1915	Forked Trails	Unknown role		
January 9, 1915	Roping a Bride	Unknown role	Prints survive	
February 16, 1915	Bill Haywood, Producer	Bill Haywood		
February 23, 1915	Slim Higgins	"Slim" Higgins	Written by Mix	
March 1, 1915	A Child of the Prairie	Tom Martin	Two reels; co-stars Louella Maxam; written by Mix	
March 2, 1915	The Man from Texas	The Man from Texas	Prints survive; written by Mix	
March 9, 1915	The Stagecoach Driver and the Girl	Tom, the stage-coach driver	Co-stars Louella Maxam; written by Mix	
March 16, 1915	Sage-Brush Tom	Sage Brush Tom	Prints survive; written by Mix	
March 23, 1915	The Outlaw's Bride	Richard Sharpe		
March 29, 1915	Ma's Girls	The Gambler	Two reels; co-stars Louella Maxam; written by Mix	
March 30, 1915	The Legal Light	Pete	Co-stars Eugenie Forde; written by Mix	
April 6, 1915	Getting a Start in Life	Tom	Co-stars Louella Maxam; story by James Oliver Curwood	
April 13, 1915	Mrs. Murphy's Cooks	Buck Martin	Co-stars Louella Maxam; written by Mix	
April 20, 1915	The Conversion of Smiling Tom	Smiling Tom	Co-stars Louella Maxam	
May 4, 1915	An Arizona Wooing	Tom Warner	Co-stars Louella Maxam; story by William MacLeod Raine; survives: UCLA	
May 14, 1915	The Matrimonial Boomerang	Tom Champion	Co-stars Louella Maxam	
June 8, 1915	Saved by Her Horse	Tom Golden	Co-stars Louella Maxam	
June 10, 1915	Pals in Blue	Tom	Three reels; co-stars Eugenie Forde	
June 15, 1915	The Heart of the Sheriff	Sheriff Martin	Co-stars Louella Maxam; written by Mix	
June 22, 1915	With the Aid of the Law	Lee Russell	Co-stars Louella Maxam	
July 20, 1915	Foreman of Bar Z Ranch	Tom Wallace	Co-stars Louella Maxam	
July 27, 1915	The Child, the Dog, and the Villain	—N/a	Stars Leo Maloney; Mix directed but does not appear	
August 3, 1915	The Taking of Mustang Pete	—N/a	Stars Leo Maloney; co-stars Louella Maxam; Mix directed but does not appear	
August 10, 1915	The Gold Dust and the Squaw	—N/a	Stars Leo Maloney; Mix directed but does not appear	
August 21, 1915	A Lucky Deal	—N/a	Stars Leo Maloney; Mix wrote and directed but does not appear	
September 7, 1915	Never Again	Unknown role	Co-stars Leo Maloney and Victoria Forde; written by Mix	
September 14, 1915	Weary Goes A-Wooing	Weary	Co-stars Victoria Forde	
September 21, 1915	The Range Girl and the Cowboy	Tom	Co-stars Leo Maloney and Victoria Forde; written by Mix	
September 25, 1915	The Auction Sale of Run-Down Ranch	Tom Hickey	Co-stars Leo Maloney and Victoria Forde; prints survive	
September 28, 1915	Her Slight Mistake	Bill	Co-stars Leo Maloney	
October 5, 1915	The Girl and the Mail Bag	Tom Chester	Co-stars Leo Maloney and Victoria Forde	
October 12, 1915	The Foreman's Choice	Tom Hickson	Co-stars Victoria Forde	
October 18, 1915	The Brave Deserve the Fair	Tom Martin	Two reels; co-stars Victoria Forde; written by Mix	
November 19, 1915	The Stagecoach Guard	Unknown role	Written by Mix	
October 26, 1915	The Race for a Gold Mine	Tom Cummins	Co-stars Victoria Forde	
November 2, 1915	Athletic Ambitions	The Wild Man	Co-stars Victoria Forde; written by Mix	
November 9, 1915	The Chef at Circle G	The ranch cook		
November 16, 1915	The Tenderfoot's Triumph	Unknown role		
November 23, 1915	The Impersonation of Tom	Unknown role		
November 30, 1915	Bad Man Bobbs	Unknown role		
December 14, 1915	On the Eagle Trail	Tom Merry	Co-stars Victoria Forde	
February 5, 1916	The Desert Calls Its Own	—N/a	Stars Victoria Forde; Mix directed but does not appear	
February 12, 1916	A Mix-Up in Movies	Tom	Written by Mix	
February 19, 1916	Making Good	Tom	Co-stars Victoria Forde; written by Mix	
February 25, 1916	Trilby's Love Disaster	—N/a	Stars Victoria Forde; Mix wrote and directed but does not appear	
March 11, 1916	The Passing of Pete	Pete	Co-stars Victoria Forde; written by Mix	
April 8, 1916	Along the Border	Tom Martin	Co-stars Victoria Forde; written by Mix	
April 22, 1916	Too Many Chefs!	Tom Forde	Co-stars Victoria Forde; written by Mix	
May 1, 1916	The Man Within	Tom Melford	Three reels; co-stars Victoria Forde	
May 13, 1916	The Sheriff's Duty	—N/a	Mix wrote and directed but does not appear	
May 27, 1916	Five Thousand Dollar Elopement	Unknown role	Co-stars Victoria Forde	
June 3, 1916	Crooked Trails	Dick Taylor	Co-stars Victoria Forde; written by Mix	
June 10, 1916	Going West to Make Good	Tom Gilmore	Co-stars Victoria Forde; written by Mix	
June 17, 1916	The Cowpuncher's Peril	Tom Meyers	Co-stars Victoria Forde; written by Mix	
June 24, 1916	Taking a Chance	Tom Manton	Co-stars Victoria Forde; written by Mix	
July 1, 1916	The Girl of Gold Gulch	Unknown role		
July 8, 1916	Some Duel	Tom	Co-stars Victoria Forde; written by Mix	
July 15, 1916	Legal Advice	Unknown role	Survives: UCLA; written by Mix	
July 22, 1916	Shooting Up the Movies	Tom Travis	Two reels; co-stars Victoria Forde; written by Mix	
July 29, 1916	Local Color on the A-1 Ranch	Tom	Co-stars Victoria Forde; written by Mix	
August 5, 1916	An Angelic Attitude	Tom Miller	Co-stars Victoria Forde	
August 12, 1916	A Western Masquerade	Unknown role	Co-stars Victoria Forde; written by Mix	
August 19, 1916	A Bear of a Story	Unknown role	Co-stars Victoria Forde; written by Mix	
August 26, 1916	Roping a Sweetheart	Tom Walker, a cowpuncher	Co-stars Victoria Forde; written by Mix	
September 2, 1916	Tom's Strategy	Unknown role	Co-stars Victoria Forde; written by Mix	
September 9, 1916	The Taming of Grouchy Bill	Tom	Prints survive; written by Mix	
September 11, 1916	The Pony Express Rider	Tom Orbig	Three reels; a remake of Saved by the Pony Express (1911); written by Mix	
September 23, 1916	A Corner in Water	Unknown role	Co-stars Victoria Forde; written by Mix	
September 30, 1916	The Raiders	Tom Gardner	Co-stars Victoria Forde; written by Mix	
October 7, 1916	The Canby Hill Outlaws	Tom Gordon	Co-stars Victoria Forde	
September 14, 1916	A Mistake in Rustlers	Tom	Co-stars Victoria Forde; written by Mix	
October 21, 1916	An Eventful Evening	Jack Winton	Co-stars Victoria Forde	
October 28, 1916	A Close Call	Dick Masters	Co-stars Victoria Forde; written by Mix	
November 4, 1916	Tom's Sacrifice	Tom Miller	Co-stars Victoria Forde; written by Mix	
November 4, 1916	When Cupid Slipped	—N/a	Directed by, written by, and starring Victoria Forde; produced by Mix	
November 11, 1916	The Sheriff's Blunder	Unknown role	Two reels; co-stars Victoria Forde; written by Mix	
December 2, 1916	Mistakes Will Happen	Unknown role	Co-stars Victoria Forde; written by Mix	
December 11, 1916	Twisted Trails	Tom Snow	Three reels; co-stars Bessie Eyton; prints survive	
December 25, 1916	The Golden Thought	Tom Daton	Three reels; co-stars Victoria Forde	
January 8, 1917	Starring in Western Stuff	Tom Sage	Two reels; fragment survives: UCLA; co-stars Victoria Forde; written and directed by Mix; partial remake of Sage-brush Tom (1915)	
January 26, 1917	The Luck That Jealousy Brought	Joe Barr	One reel; produced in 1915 but not released until 1917; co-stars Louella Maxam; directed by Mix	
February 17, 1917	The Saddle Girth	Tom, a cowpuncher	Co-stars Victoria Forde; written and directed by Mix	
February 12, 1917	The Heart of Texas Ryan	Jack Parker	Five reels; co-stars Bessie Eyton; based on the novel The Light of Western Stars by Zane Grey; survives: CD / GEH / UCLA / DFI / AFA	
July 1917	Movie Stunts by Tom Mix	Himself	Two reels	

== Fox Film Corporation ==
Mix moved from Selig to the Fox Film Corporation in 1917, starting at a salary of $350 per week. His earliest films for the studio were two-reel shorts similar to the ones he made at Selig. Within a year, however he switched to feature films. Mix's popularity soared at Fox and his salary eventually escalated to $17,000 per week.

Initially Mix worked as a writer and director as well as an actor but eventually restricted his work largely to being in front of the cameras. As his Fox films often teamed him with notable directors (such as John Ford, Sidney Franklin, Jack Conway, George Marshall, and Roy William Neill) an extra column now appears to list them. As the survival rate of Mix's Fox films is higher than his Selig films another column is added to display their survival status.

Except where noted all films are five reel features.

Release date	Title	Role	Director(s)	Survival status	Notes	Ref(s)
March 19, 1917	Hearts and Saddles	A sagebrush lover	Tom Mix and Robert Eddy	Fragment survives	Two reels; story by Mix; co-stars Victoria Forde	
May 13, 1917	The Roman Cowboy	"Bud" Ballard	Tom Mix	Lost	Two reels; story by Mix; co-stars Victoria Forde	
June 17, 1917	Six Cylinder Love	"Buck" Saunders	Tom Mix	Lost	Two reels; story by Mix; co-stars Victoria Forde	
July 23, 1917	A Soft Tenderfoot	The Tenderfoot	Tom Mix	Lost	Two reels; story by Mix; co-stars Victoria Forde	
August 12, 1917	Durand of the Bad Lands	Clem Alison	Richard Stanton	Lost	Starring Dustin Farnum and Natalie Kingston with Mix in a supporting role.	
September 3, 1917	Tom and Jerry Mix	The Foreman	Tom Mix	Lost	Two reels; story by Mix; co-stars Victoria Forde	
January 13, 1918	Cupid's Round Up	Larry Kelly	Edward LeSaint	Lost	Co-stars Wanda Hawley. Mix's first starring feature film with Fox	
February 24, 1918	Six Shooter Andy	Andy Crawford	Sidney Franklin	Lost	Co-stars Enid Markey	
April 14, 1918	Western Blood	Tex Wilson	Lynn Reynolds	Lost	Story by Mix; co-stars Victoria Forde	
June 9, 1918	Ace High	Jean Rivard	Lynn Reynolds	Survives complete: Lob		
June 30, 1918	Who's Your Father?	Tom Hartrigger	Tom Mix	Lost	Two reels	
September 8, 1918	Mr. Logan, U.S.A.	Jim Logan	Lynn Reynolds	Lost		
October 20, 1918	Fame and Fortune	Clay Burgess	Lynn Reynolds	Lost		
January 5, 1919	Treat 'Em Rough	Ned Ferguson	Lynn Reynolds	2 reels survive: GEH	Co-stars Jane Novak; film on location in Prescott, Arizona	
February 16, 1919	Hell-Roarin' Reform	Tim	Edward LeSaint	Lost		
March 30, 1919	Fighting for Gold	Jack Kilmeny	Edward LeSaint	fragment in private collection		
May 11, 1919	The Coming of the Law	Kent Hollis	Arthur Rosson	1 reel survives: LC		
July 16, 1919	The Wilderness Trail	Donald MacTavish	Edward LeSaint	Lost	Co-stars Colleen Moore	
August 24, 1919	Rough Riding Romance	Phineas Dobbs	Arthur Rosson	Fragment: LC	Co-stars Juanita Hansen; parially filmed in San Francisco, California	
October 19, 1919	The Speed Maniac	Billy Porter	Edward LeSaint	Lost	Co-stars Eva Novak	
December 7, 1919	The Feud	Jere Lynch / John Smith	Edward LeSaint	Lost	Co-stars Eva Novak	
January 24, 1920	The Cyclone	Sergeant Tim Ryerson	Cliff Smith	Lost	Co-stars Colleen Moore	
March 20, 1920	The Daredevil	Timothy Atkinson	Tom Mix	Lost	Co-stars Eva Novak	
April 24, 1920	Desert Love	Buck Marston, Jr.	Jacques Jaccard	Lost	Story by Mix; co-stars Victoria Forde	
May 20, 1920	The Terror	Bat Carson	Jacques Jaccard	Lost	Story by Mix; co-stars Eva Novak; film on location in Sonora, California	
July 4, 1920	3 Gold Coins	Bob Fleming / Bad Pat Duncan	Cliff Smith	Lost	Mix in a dual role as both the hero and the villain	
August 29, 1920	The Untamed	Whistling Dan	Emmett J. Flynn	Survives complete: GEH	Co-stars Pauline Starke; based on a novel by Max Brand	
October 1920	The Texan	Tex Benton	Lynn Reynolds	Survives complete: EYE / DFI	Six reels	
December 1920	Prairie Trails	Tex Benton	George Marshall	Lost	Six reels; a sequel to The Texan	
February 1921	The Road Demon	Hap Higgins	Lynn Reynolds	Fragment: LC / NFA		
April 1921	Hands Off!	Tex Roberts	George Marshall	Lost		
April 1921	The Queen of Sheba	—N/a	J. Gordon Edwards	Lost	Nine reels; starring Betty Blythe; Mix supervised the film's all-female chariot race sequence	
June 1921	A Ridin' Romeo	Jim Rose	George Marshall	Lost	Story by Mix; co-stars Rhea Mitchell	
July 1921	Big Town Round-Up	Larry McBride	Lynn Reynolds	Survives complete: EYE	Co-stars Laura La Plante	
August 1921	After Your Own Heart	Herbert Parker	George Marshall	Lost	Story adaptation by Mix	
September 1921	The Night Horsemen	Whistling Dan	Lynn Reynolds	Survives complete: GEH		
October 1921	The Rough Diamond	Hank Sherman	Edward Sedgwick	Lost	Story by Mix; co-stars Eva Novak	
December 1921	Trailin'	Anthony Woodbury	Lynn Reynolds	Survives complete: UCLA	Co-stars Eva Novak	
January 15, 1922	Sky High	Grant Newburg	Lynn Reynolds	Survives complete: CRdB / LC / MoMA / UCLA / GEH	Co-stars Eva Novak and J. Farrell MacDonald; location shooting at the Grand Canyon in Arizona; added to the National Film Registry in 1998	
February 26, 1922	Chasing the Moon	Dwight Locke	Edward Sedgwick	Lost	Co-stars Eva Novak	
April 2, 1922	Up and Going	David Brandon	Lynn Reynolds	Lost	Story by Mix; co-stars Eva Novak	
May 15, 1922	The Fighting Streak	Andrew Lanning	Arthur Rosson	Survives complete: BFI	Co-stars Patsy Ruth Miller; location shooting in Victorville, California	
June 18, 1922	For Big Stakes	"Clean Up" Sudden	Lynn Reynolds	Survives complete: NFA	Co-stars Patsy Ruth Miller	
August 20, 1922	Just Tony	"Red" Ferris	Lynn Reynolds	Survives complete: GEH / MoMA / UCLA / AFI	A film centering around Mix's horse Tony; based on a novel by Max Brand	
October 1, 1922	Do and Dare	Kit Carson Boone / Henry Boone	Edward Sedgwick	Lost	Location shooting in Chatsworth, California	
November 5, 1922	Tom Mix in Arabia	Billy Evans	Lynn Reynolds	Lost	Story by Mix; co-stars Barbara Bedford	
December 3, 1922	Catch My Smoke	Bob Stratton	William Beaudine	Lost	Co-stars Lillian Rich	
February 11, 1923	Romance Land	"Pep" Hawkins	Edward Sedgwick	Survives complete: NFA	Five reels; co-stars Barbara Bedford	
March 25, 1923	Three Jumps Ahead	Steve Clancy	Jack Ford	Lost	Five reels; the first of two Mix films directed by John Ford (here billed as Jack Ford)	
May 13, 1923	Stepping Fast	Grant Malvern	Joseph J. Franz	Lost	Five reels	
August 26, 1923	Soft Boiled	Tom Steele	John G. Blystone	Survives complete: GEH	Eight reels; co-stars Billie Dove	
September 9, 1923	The Lone Star Ranger	Buck Duane	Lambert Hillyer	Lost	Six reels; co-stars Billie Dove; based on the novel by Zane Grey; also filmed in 1919, 1930, and 1942 with, respectively, William Farnum, George O'Brien, and John Kimbrough in the Mix role	
October 28, 1923	Mile-a-Minute Romeo	Lucky Bill	Lambert Hillyer	Lost	Six reels	
November 18, 1923	North of Hudson Bay	Michael Dane	John Ford	Survives complete: ANF / CRdB / LC UCLA	Five reels; Mix's second film with John Ford	
December 30, 1923	Eyes of the Forest	Bruce Thornton	Lambert Hillyer	Survives incomplete: MoMA	Five reels; co-stars Pauline Starke	
February 3, 1924	Ladies to Board	Tom Faxton	John G. Blystone	Lost	Six reels; co-stars Gertrude Olmstead	
May 4, 1924	The Trouble Shooter	Tom Steele	Jack Conway	Survives complete: NFA	Six reels	
July 6, 1924	The Heart Buster	Tod Walton	Jack Conway	Lost	Five reels; co-stars Esther Ralston	
August 24, 1924	The Last of the Duanes	Buck Duane	Lynn Reynolds	Survives complete: NFA	Seven reels; co-stars Marian Nixon; based on the novel by Zane Grey	
September 21, 1924	Oh, You Tony!	Tom Masters	John G. Blystone	Lost	Seven reels; co-stars Claire Adams	
November 2, 1924	Teeth	Dave Deering	John G. Blystone	Survives complete: GEH	Seven reels; co-stars George Bancroft	
December 7, 1924	The Deadwood Coach	The Orphan	Lynn Reynolds	Lost	Seven reels; co-stars George Bancroft; based on a novel by Clarence E. Mulford; location shooting at Cedar City, Utah and Zion National Park	
February 1, 1925	Dick Turpin	Dick Turpin	John G. Blystone	Survives complete: GEH MoMA CSF	Seven reels; features Alan Hale; one of Mix's few non-Westerns; a romanticized story of the English highwayman	
March 15, 1925	Riders of the Purple Sage	Jim Lassiter	Lynn Reynolds	Survives complete: GEH MoMA	Six reels; based on the novel by Zane Grey; featuring Warner Oland and Fred Kohler; location shooting in the Alabama Hills near Lone Pine, California; also filmed in 1918, 1931, 1941, and 1996 with, respectively, William Farnum, George O'Brien, George Montgomery, and Ed Harris in the Mix role	
May 24, 1925	The Rainbow Trail	John Shefford	Lynn Reynolds	Survives complete: GEH	Six reels; based on the novel by Zane Grey; location shooting in the Painted Desert in Arizona; also filmed in 1918 with William Farnum and in 1932 with George O'Brien	
August 29, 1925	The Lucky Horseshoe	Tom Foster	John G. Blystone	Survives complete: MoMA	Five reels; co-stars Billie Dove and J. Farrell MacDonald with Ann Pennington in a cameo appearance; Gary Cooper appears as an extra	
October 11, 1925	The Everlasting Whisper	Mark King	John G. Blystone	Lost	Six reels; co-stars Alice Calhoun	
December 12, 1925	The Best Bad Man	Hugh Nichols	John G. Blystone	Survives complete: MoMA	Five reels; co-stars Clara Bow; based on a novel by Max Brand	
January 10, 1926	The Yankee Señor	Paul Wharton	Emmett J. Flynn	Survives incomplete: NFA	Five reels; co-stars Olive Borden; features a fiesta sequence filmed in Technicolor (part of this color footage survives)	
February 28, 1926	My Own Pal	Tom O'Hara	John G. Blystone	Survival status unknown	Six reels; co-stars Olive Borden	
April 18, 1926	Tony Runs Wild	Tom Trent	Thomas Buckingham	Survives complete: NFA	Six reels; co-stars Jacqueline Logan	
June 6, 1926	Hard Boiled	Tom Bouden	John G. Blystone	Survives complete: NFA	Six reels	
August 29, 1926	No Man's Gold	Tom Stone	Lewis Seiler	Survives complete: NFA	Six reels; co-stars Eva Novak	
October 17, 1926	The Great K & A Train Robbery	Tom Gordon	Lewis Seiler	Survives complete: CRdB / LC / MoMA / UCLA	Five reels; co-stars Dorothy Dwan; location shooting at Royal Gorge, Colorado	
December 5, 1926	The Canyon of Light	Tom Mills	Benjamin Stoloff	Lost	Six reels; co-stars Dorothy Dwan	
January 23, 1927	The Last Trail	Tom Dane	Lewis Seiler	Survives complete: CRdB / MoMA / GEH	Six reels; co-stars Carmelita Geraghty; based on the novel by Zane Grey	
March 13, 1927	The Broncho Twister	Tom Mason	Orville O. Dull	Lost	Six reels; co-stars Helene Costello; based on a story by Adela Rogers St. Johns	
May 8, 1927	Outlaws of Red River	Tom Morley	Lewis Seiler	Lost	Six reels; co-stars Marjorie Daw	
June 26, 1927	The Circus Ace	Tom Terry	Benjamin Stoloff	Survives complete: NFA	Five reels; co-stars Natalie Joyce	
August 21, 1927	Tumbling River	Tom Gier	Lewis Seiler	Lost	Five reels; co-stars Dorothy Dwan	
October 2, 1927	Silver Valley	Tom Tracey	Benjamin Stoloff	Lost	Five reels; co-stars Dorothy Dwan	
November 20, 1927	The Arizona Wildcat	Tom Phelan	Roy William Neill	Lost	Five reels; co-stars Dorothy Sebastian; based on a story by Adela Rogers St. Johns	
January 15, 1928	Daredevil's Reward	Tom Hardy	Eugene Forde	Lost	Six reels	
March 11, 1928	A Horseman of the Plains	Tom Swift	Benjamin Stoloff	Lost	Five reels; co-stars Sally Blane	
May 13, 1928	Hello Cheyenne	Tom Remington	Eugene Forde	Lost	Five reels; location shooting in Arizona	
July 1, 1928	Painted Post	Tom Blake	Eugene Forde	Survives complete: CI	Five reels	

== FBO Pictures ==
By 1927, numerous low-budget imitations of Mix's films were flooding the cinema market. This, along with Mix's salary, the high rental fees for his films, and Fox Films' commitment to sound films made the studio decide not to renew his contract. Following his departure from Fox, Mix went on a vaudeville tour with the Keith-Albee-Orpheum circuit. In 1928, Mix signed with the Film Booking Offices of America (FBO) studios to appear in six silent westerns. By the time his first film, The Son of the Golden West, was released FBO had merged with RKO Pictures. Mix's FBO films were not as well received by the public and press as his Fox films. As a result, after making five films for the studio production of the proposed sixth film, The Dude Ranch, was cancelled. Prints of all five of Mix's FBO films survive.

Release date	Title	Role	Director	Survival status	Notes	Ref(s)
October 1, 1928	Son of the Golden West	Tom Hardy	Eugene Forde	Survives complete: CRdB	Six reels	
August 9, 1928	King Cowboy	Tex Rogers	Robert De Lacy	Survives complete: FA	Seven reels; co-stars Sally Blane	
January 29, 1929	Outlawed	Tom Manning	Eugene Forde	Survives complete: EYE	Seven reels; co-stars Sally Blane	
March 19, 1929	The Drifter	Tom McCall	Robert De Lacy	Survives complete: CN / LOC	Six reels; co-stars Dorothy Dwan	
May 29, 1929	The Big Diamond Robbery	Tom Markham	Eugene Forde	Survives complete: LOC	Seven reels; co-stars Kathryn McGuire	

== Universal Pictures ==
Following his departure from FBO Mix returned to the vaudeville circuit, followed by two years with the Sells Floto Circus. In November 1931, Mix received an offer from Carl Laemmle of Universal Studios to star in a series of sound westerns. The resulting nine films (plus a cameo appearance in a tenth) proved to be popular at the box office. In December 1932, however, Mix ended his association with Universal due to injuries and a bout of influenza. All of Mix's Universal films survive (see references for each film).

Release date	Title	Role	Director	Notes	Ref(s)
March 28, 1932	The Cohens and Kellys in Hollywood	Himself	John Francis Dillon	75 minutes; Mix, Genevieve Tobin, Boris Karloff, Sidney Fox, Lew Ayres and Gloria Stuart make cameo appearances in a sequence filmed at the Cocoanut Grove nightclub in the Ambassador Hotel.	
April 17, 1932	Destry Rides Again	Tom Destry	Benjamin Stoloff	53 minutes; co-stars Claudia Dell and ZaSu Pitts; based on a novel by Max Brand; remade in 1939 with James Stewart and Marlene Dietrich and as Destry (1955) with Audie Murphy	
May 26, 1932	The Rider of Death Valley	Tom Rigby	Albert S. Rogell	76 minutes; co-stars Lois Wilson	
June 30, 1932	The Texas Bad Man	Tom / Dan Bishop	Edward Laemmle	60 minutes	
August 2, 1932	My Pal, the King	Tom Reed	Kurt Neumann	75 minutes; co-stars Mickey Rooney	
September 29, 1932	The Fourth Horseman	Tom Martin	Hamilton MacFadden	57 minutes; co-stars Margaret Lindsay	
November 3, 1932	Hidden Gold	Tom	Arthur Rosson	61 minutes	
February 2, 1933	Terror Trail	Tom Munroe	Armand Schaefer	57 minutes	
June 1932	Flaming Guns	Tom Malone	Arthur Rosson	57 minutes; co-stars William Farnum and Ruth Hall	
September 1933	Rustlers' Roundup	Tom Lawson	Henry MacRae	60 minutes; co-stars Noah Beery, Jr.	

== Mascot ==
Following his departure from Universal, Mix returned to live performances. In 1934, he joined with showman Sam Gill to form the "Tom Mix Wild West and Sam Gill Circus (Combined)". Following Gill's death from a heart attack Mix bought out his late partner's ownership. To help finance this deal Mix signed with film producer Nat Levine's Mascot Pictures to appear in a western serial. Although a major box office hit, the resulting effort was Mix's final film.

Release date	Title	Role	Directors	Notes	Ref
May 18, 1935	The Miracle Rider	Tom Morgan	Armand Schaefer; B. Reeves Eason	A 15-chapter serial (303 minutes); co-stars Charles Middleton; prints survive	

== Other film appearances ==
Mix appeared as himself in two early sound short films that were part of the "Voice of Hollywood" series. Both were produced by Tiffany-Stahl Productions and released in 1930.

== Archives with Mix films ==
The following film archives have prints of Tom Mix films. The abbreviations are used in the survival status section for the Fox films and in the notes section for all other films.

- AFA = Academy Film Archive, Hollywood, CA, USA
- ANF = Arhiva Națională de Filme (National Film Archive), Romania
- CI = Cineteca Italiana, Milan, Italy
- CN = Cineteca Nazionale (National Film Archive), Rome, Italy
- CRdB = Cinematheque Royale de Belgique, Brussels, Belgium
- CSF = Cinemateket-Svenska Filminstitutet, Stockholm, Sweden
- DFI = Danish Film Institute, Gothersgade, Copenhagen, Denmark
- EYE = EYE Film Institute Netherlands, Amsterdam, Netherlands
- FA = Filmarchiv Austria, Vienna, Austria
- GEH = George Eastman Museum, Rochester, New York, USA
- LC = Library of Congress, Washington, DC, USA
- Lob = Lobster Films, Paris, France
- NFA = Narodni Filmovy Archiv, Prague, Czech Republic
- MoMA = Museum of Modern Art, New York, NY, USA
- UCLA = UCLA Film & Television Archive, Los Angeles, CA, USA
