= The Man from Texas =

The Man from Texas may refer to:

- The Man from Texas (1915 film), an American Western film
- The Man from Texas (1948 film), an American Western film
- Man from Texas (1939 film), an American Western film
