= Sid Jordan =

American actor (1889–1970)

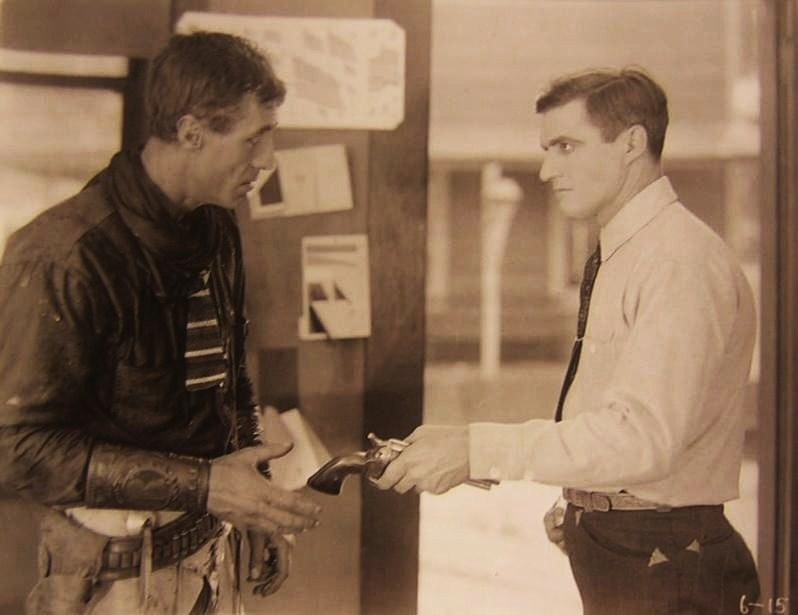
- Still of Jordan (right) with Tom Mix in The Coming of the Law (1919)
- Born: August 12, 1889; Muskogee, Oklahoma, United States
- Died: September 30, 1970 (aged 81); Hemet, California, United States
- Occupation: Actor
- Years active: 1913-1944

Sid Jordan (August 12, 1889 – September 30, 1970) was an American film actor.

== Biography ==
Born in Muskogee, Oklahoma in 1889, Jordan was introduced to acting through his close friend Tom Mix, when both men were serving as the "Night Marshalls" of Dewey, Oklahoma. Ironically, it was Sid Jordan's father (Col. John Jordan) who helped Sid and Tom Mix obtain their jobs as Night Marshalls, as John Jordan was Sheriff of Washington County, Oklahoma. Sid and Tom made their first film together in Oklahoma, then starred in many films together in Los Angeles, along with Victoria Forde, Tom Mix's wife at that time. Jordan appeared in 130 films between 1913 and 1944. He died in Hemet, California, in 1970.

== Selected filmography ==
- The Man from Texas (1915)
- The Golden Thought (1917)
- The Wilderness Trail (1919)
- Rough Riding Romance (1919)
- The Coming of the Law (1919)
- The Feud (1919)
- 3 Gold Coins (1920)
- The Untamed (1920)
- The Texan (1920)
- Prairie Trails (1920)
- The Night Horsemen (1921)
- The Rough Diamond (1921)
- Trailin' (1921)
- After Your Own Heart (1921)
- A Ridin' Romeo (1921)
- Hands Off! (1921)
- Sky High (1922)
- Chasing the Moon (1922)
- For Big Stakes (1922)
- The Boss of Camp 4 (1922)
- Up and Going (1922)
- Where is This West? (1923)
- Men in the Raw (1923)
- The Ridin' Kid from Powder River (1924)
- The Deadwood Coach (1924)
- Dick Turpin (1925)
- Rustling for Cupid (1926)
- The Johnstown Flood (1926)
- The Dude Ranger (1934)
- Thunder Mountain (1935)
- Hollywood Cowboy (1937)
- The Fighting Gringo (1939)
