= Trouble (1922 film) =

1922 film by Albert Austin

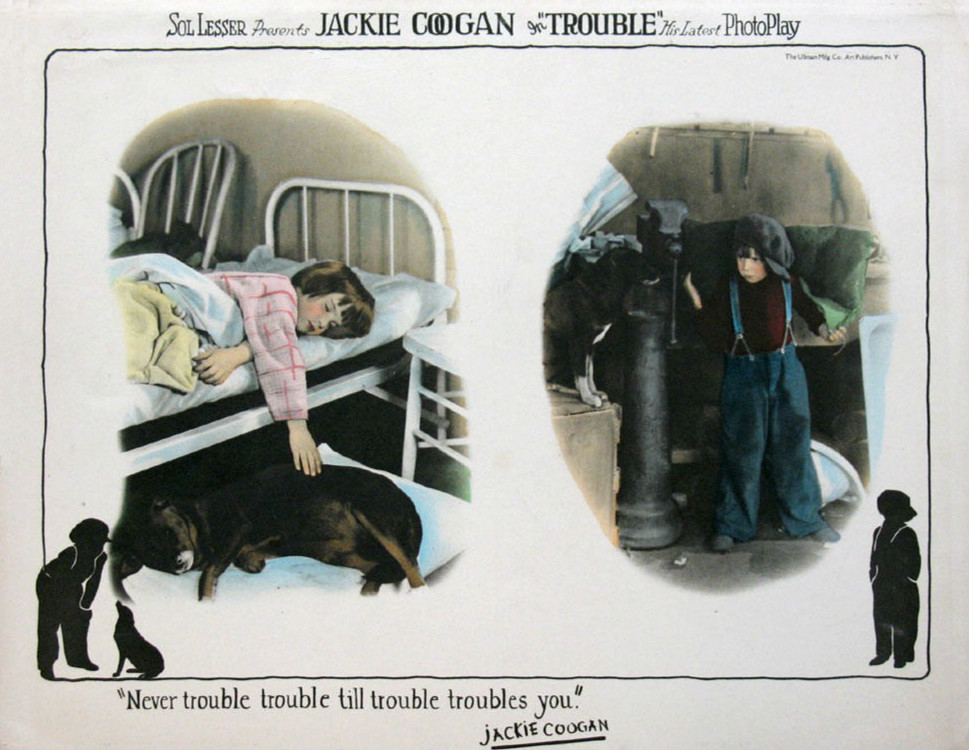
- Lobby card
- Directed by: Albert Austin
- Written by: Max Abramson
- Produced by: Sol Lesser; Jack Coogan Sr.
- Starring: Jackie Coogan; Wallace Beery; Gloria Hope
- Cinematography: Glen MacWilliams; Robert Martin
- Edited by: Irene Morra
- Distributed by: Associated First National Pictures
- Release date: August 7, 1922
- Running time: 5 reels
- Country: United States
- Language: Silent (English intertitles)

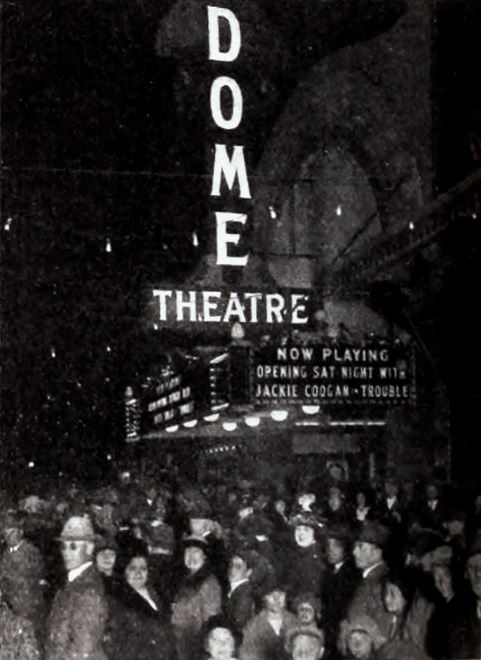
The Dome Theatre in Ocean Park, Santa Monica in 1922, showing Trouble.

Trouble is a 1922 American silent comedy-drama film directed by Albert Austin and written by Max Abramson. The film stars Jackie Coogan, Wallace Beery, and Gloria Hope. The film was released on August 7, 1922, by Associated First National Pictures.

== Plot ==
As described in a film magazine, Danny is a kid at a private orphanage where he is beset with much grief in his attempts to prevent the sending away of his pet dog. The orphanage is to be abandoned and its little charges are offered for adoption. Danny finds a new home but it is far from an ideal home.

The wife-beating husband Ed Lee is finally put where he can work off his excess energy on a rock pile, while Danny, his foster mother, and her parents repair to an old farmhouse in the country where all is well.

== Cast ==
- Jackie Coogan as Danny, the Kid
- Wallace Beery as Ed Lee, the Plumber
- Gloria Hope as Mrs. Lee, the Plumber's Wife
- Queenie the Dog as herself
- Valentine Black as Girl (uncredited)
- Tom Wilson (uncredited)

== Preservation ==
Prints of Trouble exists at Gosfilmofond in Russia and EYE Film Institute Netherlands.
