= The Man from the East =

1914 film

- Directed by: Tom Mix
- Written by: Tom Mix
- Starring: Tom Mix
- Production company: Selig Polyscope Company
- Release date: December 15, 1914
- Running time: 10 minutes
- Country: United States
- Languages: Silent; English intertitles

The Man from the East is a 1914 American short silent Western film written, directed by and starring Tom Mix.

== Plot ==
According to a film magazine, "Tom Bates is living in the city enjoying a liberal fortune left him by an uncle recently deceased. When Tom received his fortune he was working on a ranch as a cowboy and was a top-notcher, too. In the city he has met May, a charming and beautiful girl, who is engaged to marry him. Tern rescues a forlorn girl in the park from a ruffian. May breaks the engagement and Tom decides to return West. He gets a job as cowboy en a big ranch after demonstrating his prowess in every manner, so that he at once becomes a favorite.

May is invited to visit her aunt's ranch and on the way the stage coach in which she is riding is run away with by the frantic horses. Tom and his companions witness the runaway and Tom, riding across fields, intercepts it, imperils his life by leaping from his horse to the footboard, and reining in the runaway team he saves the life of May. Tom is astonished to find her in the coach and she is delighted to find that he is her preserver. They are happily reunited."

== Cast ==
- Tom Mix as Tom Bates
- Goldie Colwell as May
- Leo D. Maloney as Ranch Foreman
- Pat Chrisman as Stage Driver
- Inez Walker as May's Aunt
- Hoot Gibson as Butler
- C.W. Bachman as Valet (uncredited)
- Ed Jones as Hotel Keeper (uncredited)
- R.H. Kelly as Tough (uncredited)
- Susie Morella as Maid (uncredited)

== See also ==
- Hoot Gibson filmography
- Tom Mix filmography
