= Sky High (1922 film) =

1922 American silent western film

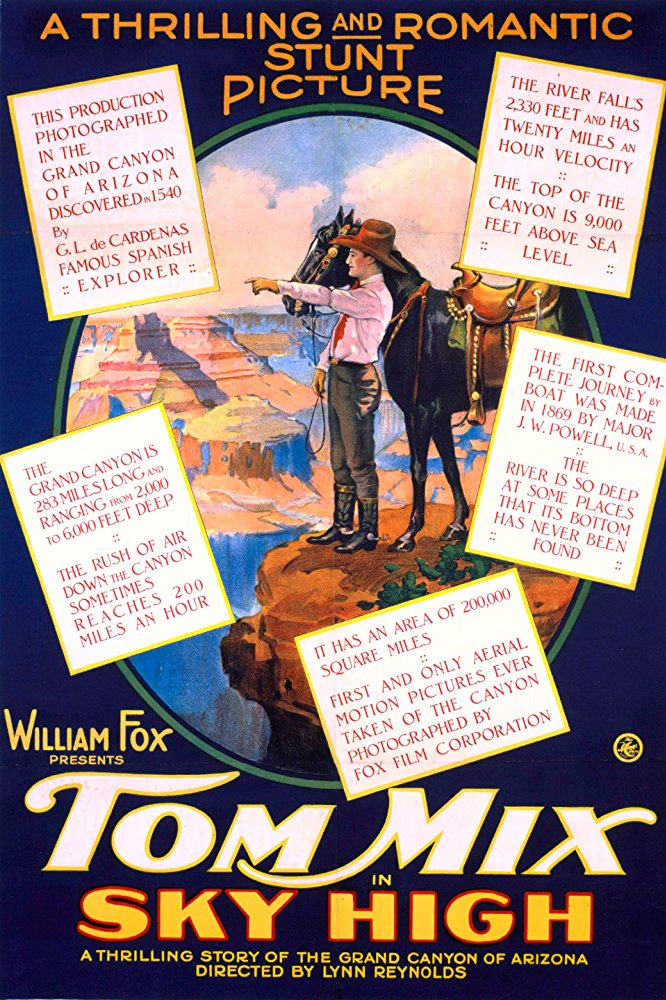
- Theatrical poster
- Directed by: Lynn Reynolds
- Written by: Lynn Reynolds (screenplay); Lynn Reynolds (story)
- Produced by: William Fox
- Starring: Tom Mix; J. Farrell MacDonald
- Cinematography: Benjamin H. Kline
- Production company: Fox Film Corporation
- Distributed by: Fox Film Corporation
- Release date: January 22, 1922
- Running time: 58 minutes (5 reels)
- Country: United States
- Languages: Silent; English intertitles

Sky High is a 1922 American silent Western film written and directed by Lynn Reynolds and starring Tom Mix, J. Farrell MacDonald, Eva Novak and Sid Jordan. The action in Sky High takes place in 1922 and while the characters ride horses and fight in saloons, they also use telephones, automobiles and even an aircraft.

In 1998, the film was selected for preservation in the United States National Film Registry by the Library of Congress as being "culturally, historically, or aesthetically significant".

== Plot ==
Sky High (1922)

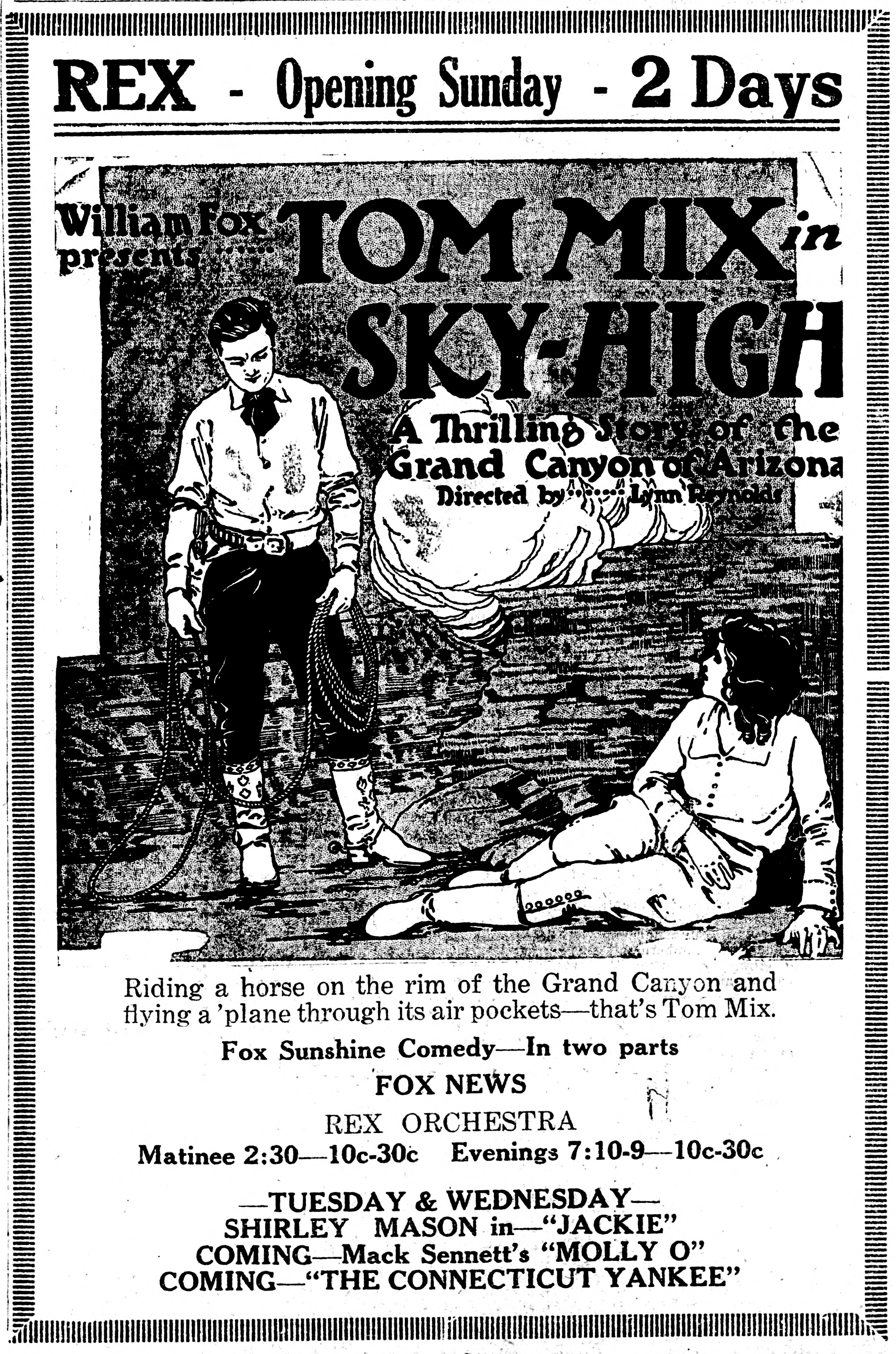
Newspaper advertisement

Grant Newbury, Deputy Inspector of Immigration at the US/Mexico border is asked by his boss to infiltrate a gang smuggling Chinese workers through the border at Calexico, in order to identify and arrest their ringleader. Meanwhile, in Chicago, Estelle Halloway is disappointed because her guardian wrote that she would not be able to spend her holidays with him in Calexico as planned. When she wires him that she will come nevertheless with her roommate Marguerite and her brother, he tells her that they will meet instead near the Grand Canyon as it is too warm in Calexico.

In Calexico, Grant finds out that the ringleader is none other than Jim Frazer, Estelle's guardian. He becomes part of the gang and is requested to go and help taking of the Chinese now hidden in a camp in Grand Canyon. After having left discreetly the camp to fetch the police, he sees Estelle on the point of drowning in a river and saves her. He is caught by the bandit who have learned that he is a government agent but manages to escape first on horseback then in a motor car and reaches the little town of Williams where he gets the help of the police.

While the police drives to the hidden camp in motor cars, Grant borrows an aircraft and flies into the Grand Canyon, where he jumps in a river and manages to free Estelle. Jim Frazer is identified as the ringleader and arrested, but to protect Estelle, Grant accepts that he lets her believe that he is leaving for a long trip. Frazer asks Grant whether he would help take care of Estelle while he is in jail, and Grant answers: "I'll look after her the rest of her life if she'll let me."

== Cast ==
- Tom Mix as Grant Newbury
- J. Farrell MacDonald as Jim Frazer
- Eva Novak as Estelle Halloway - his ward
- Sid Jordan as Andrew Bates
- William Buckley as Victor Castle
- Adele Warner as Marguerite Castle
- Tony the Horse
- Wynn Mace as Henchman Patterson
- Pat Chrisman as Pasquale - Henchman

== Production ==
Principal photography for Sky High took place at the Fox Films studio in Los Angeles and on location at the Grand Canyon National Park, Arizona, Williams, Arizona, and the El Tovar Hotel, Grand Canyon National Park, Arizona. While Tom Mix rarely used doubles, Bud Creeth was hired as a "stunt pilot", flying with Dick Grace to film the dangerous stunt of hanging from a rope over the Grand Canyon. (Note: A scene in Sky High nearly ended in disaster as stuntman Bud Creeth, after repeating the stunt three times, hung from an aircraft but was saved by pilot Dick Grace.)

== Reception ==
In a modern reappraisal of Sky High, reviewer Hans J. Wollstein described the film, "Diehard Western fans decried the lack of realism, but audiences flocked to see this film which, more than perhaps any other, changed Mix from a popular Western star into an internationally recognized showman."

== See also ==
- Tom Mix filmography
