= Gloria Hope =

American actress

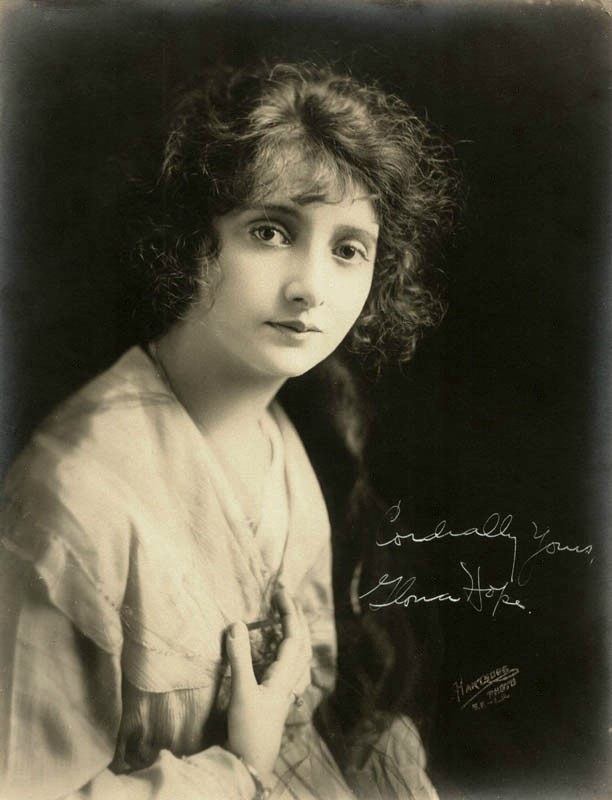
- Hope, c. 1920
- Born: Olive Frances; November 9, 1901; Pittsburgh, Pennsylvania, U.S.
- Died: October 29, 1976 (aged 74); Pasadena, California, U.S.
- Occupation: Actress
- Years active: 1917–1926
- Spouses: Lloyd Hughes (m. 1921; died 1958) Joe Bishow (m. 1927; ann. 1928)
- Children: 2

Gloria Hope (born Olive Frances, November 9, 1901 – October 29, 1976) was an American silent film actress.

== Life and career ==
She was born as Olive Frances in Pittsburgh, Pennsylvania, in 1901. Following her education at a Newark, New Jersey, school, she entered upon her career as a screen player and played successively with Ince, Triangle, Artcraft, Ince Paramount, Paralta, Universal and Goldwyn. Naughty, Naughty, The Gay Lord Quex, Burglar by Proxy, The Hushed Hour, The Great Love, and Outcasts of Poker Flat were a few of the many screen plays she appeared in. In 1920, Who's Who on the Screen reported that Hope was 5 feet 2 inches (1.57 m) high, weighed 106 pounds (48 kg) and had a light complexion, auburn hair and blue eyes.

She was signed in 1917 and starred in about 30 films before her retirement in 1926 at age 25 to have children.

She starred with William Garwood in films such as The Guilty Man in 1918, and with Mary Pickford and Lloyd Hughes in Tess of the Storm Country in 1922.

She married Lloyd Hughes on June 30, 1921, and they had children Donald and Isabel. On October 11, 1927, she married Joe Bishow, but the marriage was annulled in 1928.

Hope died in Pasadena, California. She is interred at Glendale's Forest Lawn Memorial Park Cemetery, near Hughes.

== Filmography ==
=== 1920s ===
- Sandy (1926) .... Judith Moore
- That Devil Quemado (1925) .... Joanna Thatcher
- Tess of the Storm Country (1922) .... Teola Graves
- Trouble (1922) .... Mrs. Lee, the Plumber's Wife
- The Grim Comedian (1921) .... Dorothy
- Courage (1921) .... Eve Hamish
- Colorado (1921) .... Kitty Doyle
- Prairie Trails (1920) .... Alice Endicott
- The Texan (1920) .... Alice Marcum
- Seeds of Vengeance (1920) .... Mary Reddin
- The Desperate Hero (1920) .... Mabel Darrow
- The Third Woman (1920) .... Marcelle Riley

=== 1910s ===
- Too Much Johnson (1919) .... Leonora Faddish
- The Gay Lord Quex (1919) .... Muriel Eden
- Rider of the Law (1919) .... Betty
- Burglar by Proxy (1919) .... Dorothy Mason
- The Outcasts of Poker Flat (1919) .... Ruth Watson/Sophy, the girl
- Bill Apperson's Boy (1919) .... Martha Yarton
- The Hushed Hour (1919) .... Annie Vierge
- The Heart of Rachael (1918) .... Magsie Clay
- The Law of the North (1918) .... Virginie de Montcalm
- The Great Love (1918) .... Jessie Lovewell
- $5,000 Reward (1918) .... Margaret Hammersley
- Free and Equal (1918) .... Margaret Lowell
- Naughty, Naughty! (1918) .... Judith Holmes
- The Guilty Man (1918) .... Claudine Flambon
- Time Locks and Diamonds (1917) .... Marjory Farrel
