= The Boss of Camp 4 =

Lost 1922 film

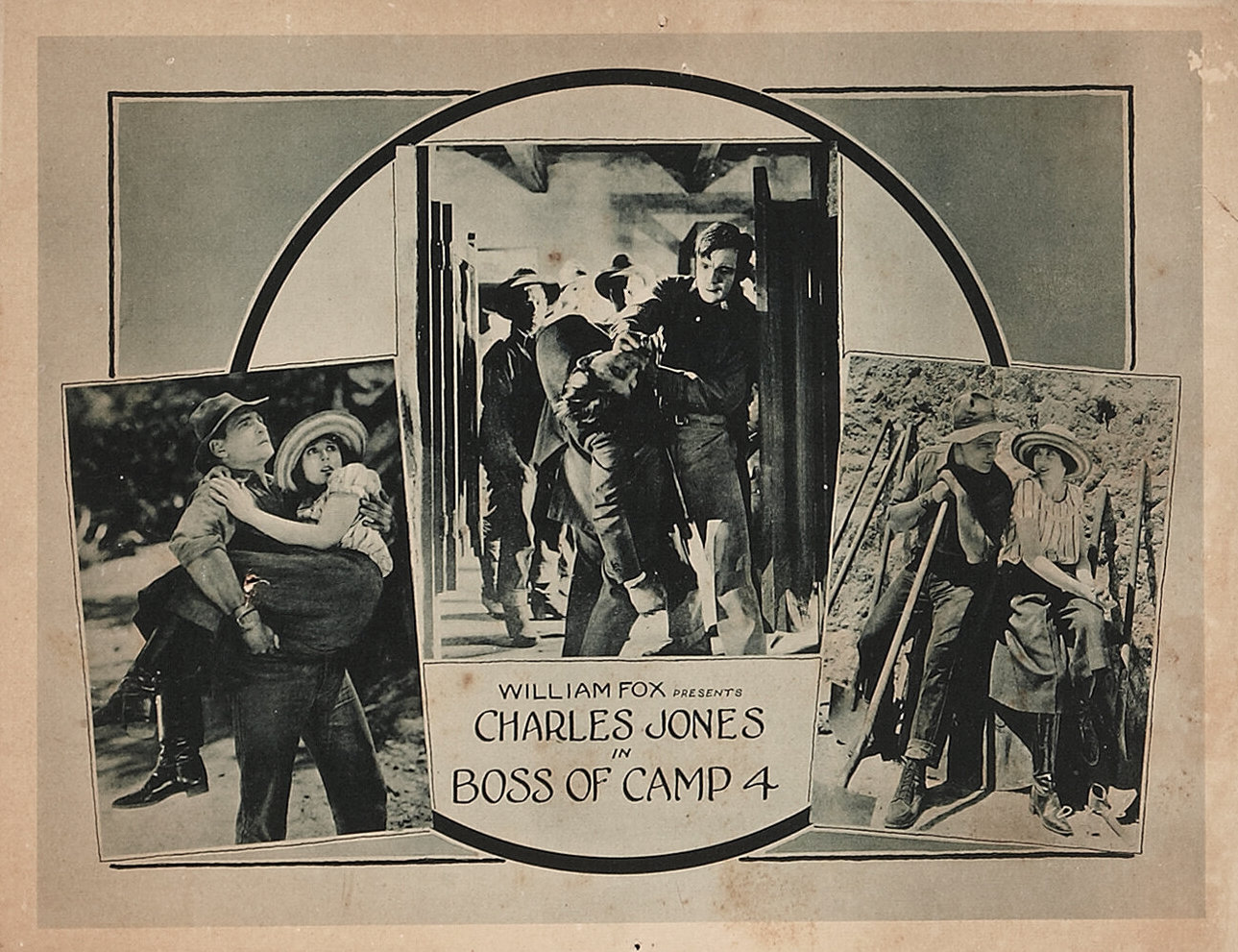
- Lobby card
- Directed by: W. S. Van Dyke
- Written by: Paul Schofield
- Based on: The Boss of Camp Four by Arthur Preston Hankins
- Starring: Buck Jones; Fritzi Brunette; G. Raymond Nye; Francis Ford; Sid Jordan
- Cinematography: Devereaux Jennings; Ernest Miller
- Production company: Fox Film Corporation
- Distributed by: Fox Film Corporation
- Release date: November 26, 1922
- Running time: 50 minutes; 5 reels
- Country: United States
- Languages: Silent film (English intertitles)

The Boss of Camp 4 is a 1922 American silent action film directed by W. S. Van Dyke and starring Buck Jones, Fritzi Brunette, G. Raymond Nye, Francis Ford, and Sid Jordan. It is based on the novel by Arthur Preston Hankins with the same name. The film was released by Fox Film Corporation on November 26. 1922.

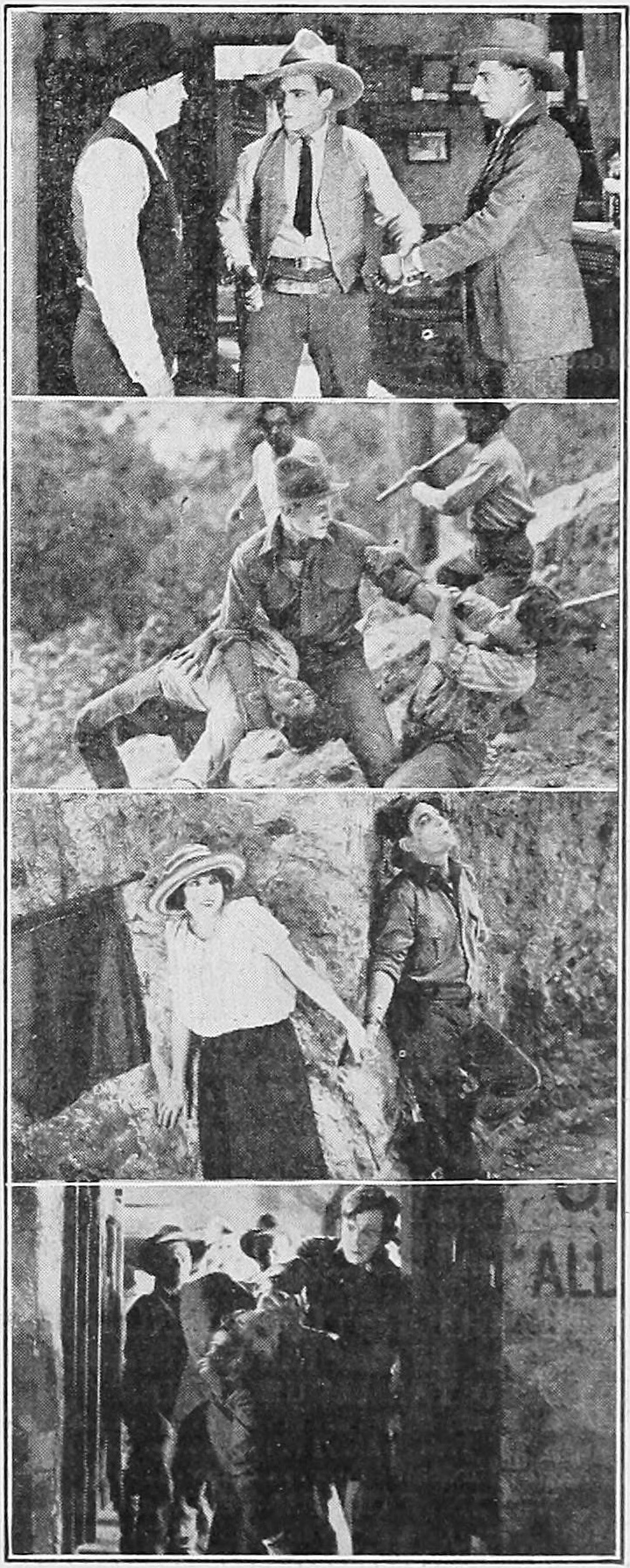
Scenes from the film

== Plot ==
Chet Fanning is hired on as a road worker. Dude McCormick attempts to prevent the road's completion so that he can regain possession of the coal rich land. Fanning rescues Iris Paxton from McCormick's schemes, and wins her love in the end.

== Cast ==
- Buck Jones as Chet Fanning (as Charles Jones)
- Fritzi Brunette as Iris Paxton
- G. Raymond Nye as Dave Miller
- Francis Ford as Dude McCormick
- Sid Jordan as Warren Zome
- Milton Ross as Andrew Paxton

== Preservation ==
The film is now considered lost.
