= The Desperate Hero =

1920 film

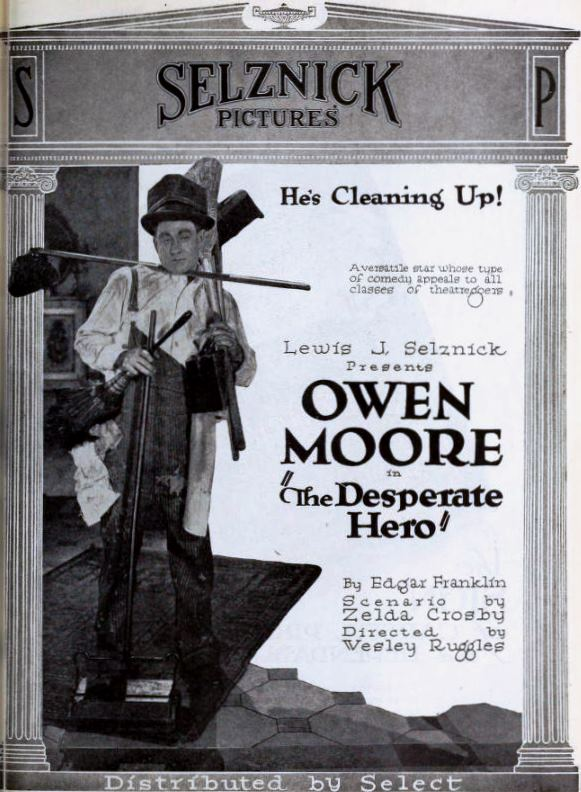
- Directed by: Wesley Ruggles
- Written by: Zelda Crosby; Edgar Franklin
- Produced by: Lewis J. Selznick
- Starring: Owen Moore; Gloria Hope; Emmett King
- Production company: Selznick Pictures
- Distributed by: Selznick Pictures
- Release date: June 7, 1920
- Running time: 60 minutes
- Country: United States
- Languages: Silent; English intertitles

The Desperate Hero is a 1920 American silent comedy film directed by Wesley Ruggles and starring Owen Moore, Gloria Hope, Emmett King.

== Cast ==
- Owen Moore as Henry Baird
- Gloria Hope as Mabel Darrow
- Emmett King as Philip Darrow
- Rube Miller as Alan Moss
- Arthur Hoyt as Whitty
- Charles Arling as Joseph Plant
- Nell Craig asEvelyn Plant
- Virginia Caldwell as Dorothy Kind
- Tom Ricketts as Butler

== Bibliography ==
- Connelly, Robert B. The Silents: Silent Feature Films, 1910-36, Volume 40, Issue 2. December Press, 1998.
- Munden, Kenneth White. The American Film Institute Catalog of Motion Pictures Produced in the United States, Part 1. University of California Press, 1997.
