= Too Much Johnson =

Too Much Johnson may refer to:

- Too Much Johnson (1938 film), an American silent comedy film
- Too Much Johnson (1919 film), a lost American silent comedy film
