= Saved by the Pony Express =

1911 film

- Directed by: Francis Boggs
- Produced by: Selig Polyscope Company; William Selig
- Starring: Tom Mix
- Distributed by: General Film Company
- Release date: August 1, 1911
- Running time: 1 reel; 12 minutes
- Country: United States
- Languages: Silent; English intertitles

Saved by the Pony Express is a 1911 American short silent Western film produced by the Selig Polyscope Company and starring Tom Mix. Also known as Pony Express Rider, it is preserved at the Library of Congress.

== Cast ==
- Tom Mix as Pony Express Rider
- Thomas Carrigan as Happy Jack
- Old Blue as Tom's horse

Saved By The Pony Express (1911)

== See also ==
- Tom Mix filmography
