= 3 Gold Coins =

1920 film

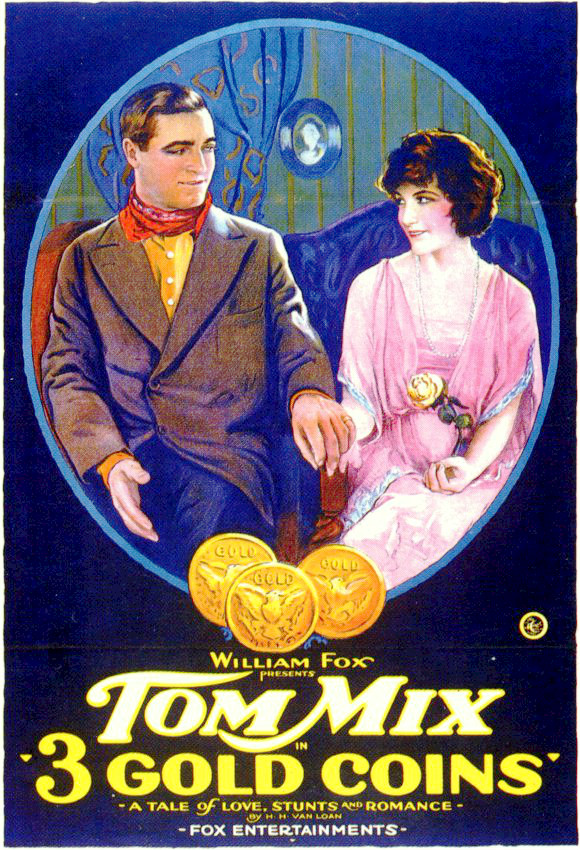
- Film poster
- Directed by: Clifford Smith
- Written by: Alvin J. Neitz (scenario) (aka Alan James)
- Story by: H. H. Van Loan
- Produced by: William Fox
- Starring: Tom Mix
- Cinematography: Frank Good
- Distributed by: Fox Film Corporation
- Release date: July 4, 1920
- Running time: 5 reels
- Country: United States
- Languages: Silent; English intertitles

3 Gold Coins is a lost 1920 American silent Western film directed by Clifford Smith and starring Tom Mix. It was produced and distributed by Fox Film Corporation.

== Plot ==
Things are not going well for Bob Fleming. Then, while showing off for Betty Reed and her father, he shoots through three gold coins, which Bob keeps as lucky charms.

J. M. Ballinger and Rufus Berry arrive in the township of Four Corners and proceed to plant oil on Fleming's property, with plans to sell stock to the townsfolk. Bob is implicated in the scheme and arrested for fraud.

In the end, it turns out there really is oil on Fleming's land.

== Cast ==
- Tom Mix as Bob Fleming / Bad Pat Duncan
- Margaret Loomis as Betty Reed
- Frank Whitson as Luther M. Reed
- Bert Hadley as J. M. Ballinger
- Dick Rush as Rufus Berry
- Margaret Cullington as Maria Bimble
- Sylvia Jocelyn as Peggy Benson
- Bonnie Hill as Katherine Briggs
- Sid Jordan as Boots
- Walt Robbins as Spike
- Frank Weed as One-legged townsman

== Production ==
3 Gold Coins began filming at Mixville (the Fox movie ranch) starting in early December and the production wrapped up in early January 1920.

== Preservation ==
With no holdings located in archives, 3 Gold Coins is considered a lost film.

== See also ==
- 1937 Fox vault fire
- Tom Mix filmography
- List of American films of 1920
