= Love in Quarantine =

1910 film

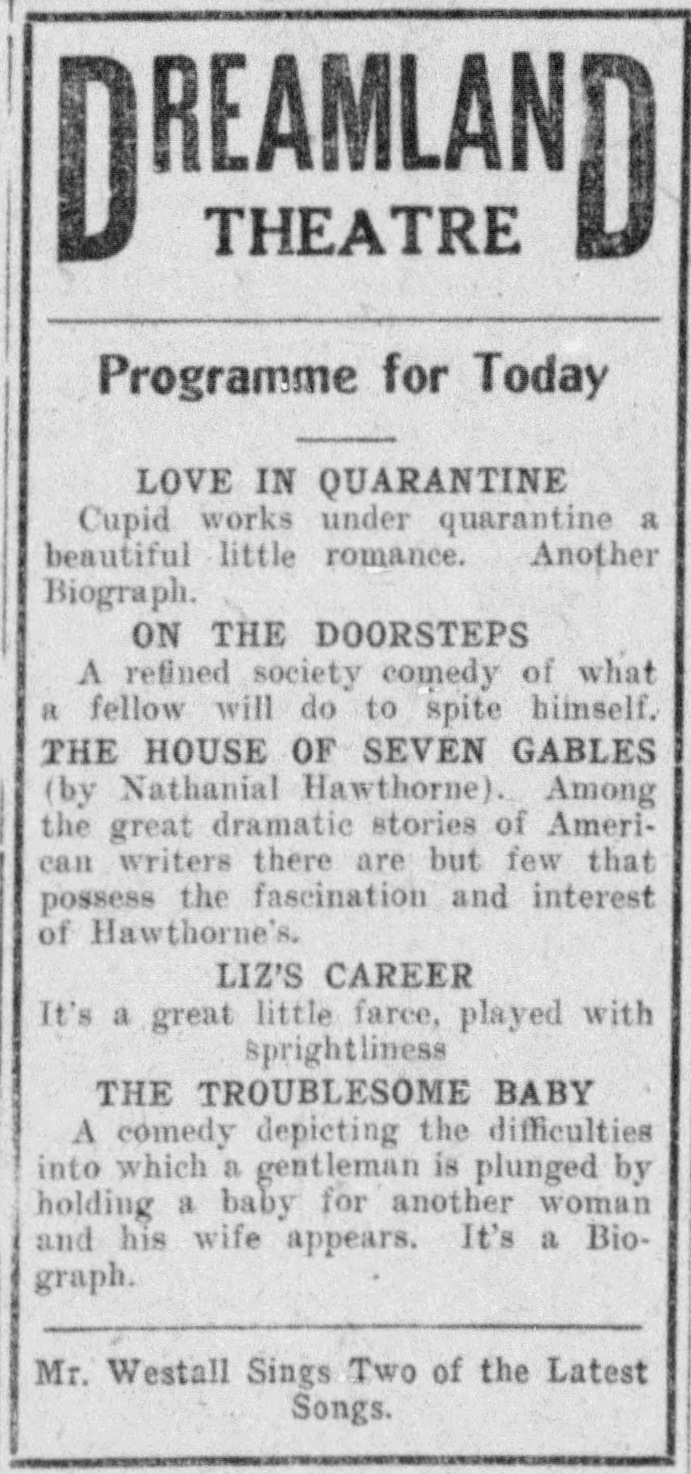
- Advertisement for several films including Love in Quarantine
- Directed by: Frank Powell
- Starring: Mack Sennett
- Cinematography: Arthur Marvin
- Distributed by: Biograph Company
- Release date: November 17, 1910
- Country: United States
- Languages: Silent; English intertitles

Love in Quarantine is a 1910 short silent comedy film directed by Frank Powell and starring Mack Sennett.

== Plot ==
The characters Harold and Edith become engaged. However, a feud starts and Edith leaves Harold at the gate to return to their home. Harold follows her back and they both discover a doctor attending to their maid. The ailment forces the doctor to quarantine the home, preventing both Edith and Harold from leaving. They must now sort out their feud in the confines of their place until they both get vaccinated. Edith's mother tries to help things out by having Harold fake sickness, in hopes to draw compassion from Edith. It works briefly, until Edith finds out he's faking it. Even so, the quarrel is resolved and all things return to a happy ending.

== Cast ==
- Stephanie Longfellow as Edith
- Mack Sennett as Harold
- Grace Henderson as Edith's Mother
- Verner Clarges as The Doctor
- Victoria Forde as One of Two Girls
- Jeanie Macpherson
- Owen Moore
- Vivian Prescott
- Lucille Lee Stewart as The Maid (unconfirmed)
- Blanche Sweet
- Dorothy West

== See also ==
- List of American films of 1910
- Blanche Sweet filmography
