= Because of a Woman =

1917 American silent drama film

- Directed by: Jack Conway
- Written by: E. Magnus Ingleton; George Elwood Jenks
- Starring: Jack Livingston; Belle Bennett; George Chesebro
- Cinematography: Paul Eagler
- Production company: Triangle Film Corporation
- Distributed by: Triangle Distributing
- Release date: December 16, 1917
- Running time: 5 reels
- Country: United States
- Languages: Silent; English intertitles

Because of a Woman is a 1917 American silent drama film directed by Jack Conway and starring Jack Livingston, Belle Bennett, Louella Maxam, and George Chesebro.

== Cast ==
- Belle Bennett as Valerie
- Jack Livingston as Noel Clavering
- Louella Maxam as Muriel Gwynne
- George Chesebro as Allan Barrett
- Lillian Langdon as Luela Malvern
- Josef Swickard as Col. Gwynne
- George C. Pearce as John Trenton

== Bibliography ==
- James Robert Parish & Michael R. Pitts. Film directors: a guide to their American films. Scarecrow Press, 1974.
