= Men in the Raw =

1923 film

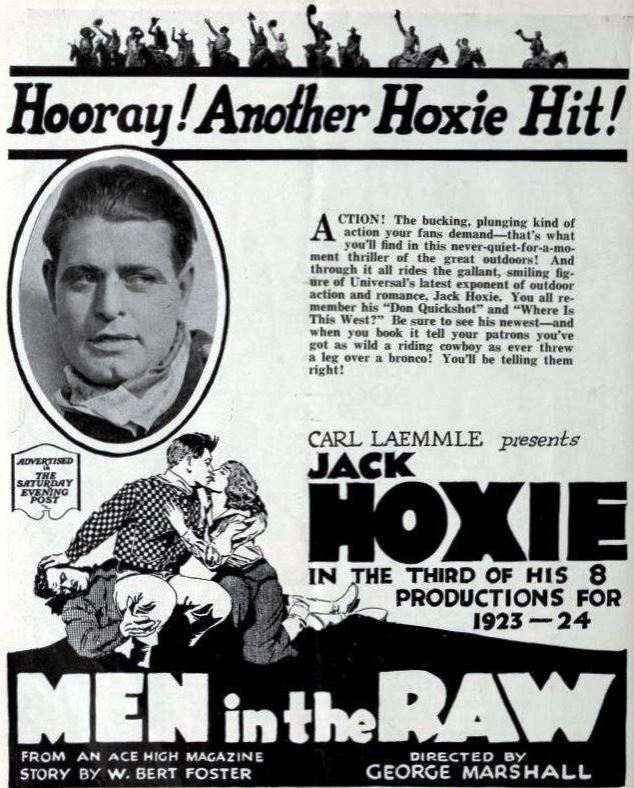
- Advertisement
- Directed by: George Marshall
- Screenplay by: George Hively
- Based on: Men in the Raw by W. Bert Foster
- Starring: Jack Hoxie; Marguerite Clayton; Sid Jordan; J. Morris Foster; Tom Kerrick; William Lowery
- Cinematography: Harry M. Fowler; Ray Ramsey
- Production company: Universal Pictures
- Distributed by: Universal Pictures
- Release date: October 16, 1923
- Running time: 50 minutes
- Country: United States
- Language: Silent (English intertitles)

Men in the Raw is a 1923 American silent Western film directed by George Marshall and written by George Hively. The film stars Jack Hoxie, Marguerite Clayton, Sid Jordan, J. Morris Foster, Tom Kerrick, and William Lowery. The film was released on October 16, 1923, by Universal Pictures.

== Plot ==
As described in a film magazine, Windy Watkins (Hoxie), noted prevaricator, tells the men of the Bar Nothing Ranch a series of thrilling adventures, and a stranger becomes interested. So Windy proceeds to tell him how he and Phil Hollis (Foster) while in Alaska had trouble with a pair of men who had known Phil in Montana. Phil was killed, Windy tells the stranger, and Windy was accused. He escaped and assumed the charge of the ranch of Eunice Hollis (Clayton), which is under threat of cattle rustlers, but was forced to leave when word of the murder accusation bobs up. Windy completes the story, and then the stranger surprises them by saying that Windy told the truth and that he was a federal marshal come to arrest the storyteller. A chase ensues, and the men grapple midstream and then carried through a subterranean passage until they reach the hiding place of Bill Spray (Jordan) and his cattle rustlers. The marshal finds in Spray the real murderer when Windy makes him confess. His innocence and veracity established, Windy returns to Eunice.

== Cast ==
- Jack Hoxie as Windy Watkins
- Marguerite Clayton as Eunice Hollis
- Sid Jordan as Bill Spray
- J. Morris Foster as Phil Hollis
- Tom Kerrick as Les Elder
- William Lowery as Marshal Flynn
- Art Manning as Tom Morley
- Tex Parker as Spray Henchman
- Scout as Windy's Horse

== Preservation ==
With no prints of Men in the Raw located in any film archives, it is considered a lost film.
