= Excitement (film) =

1924 film

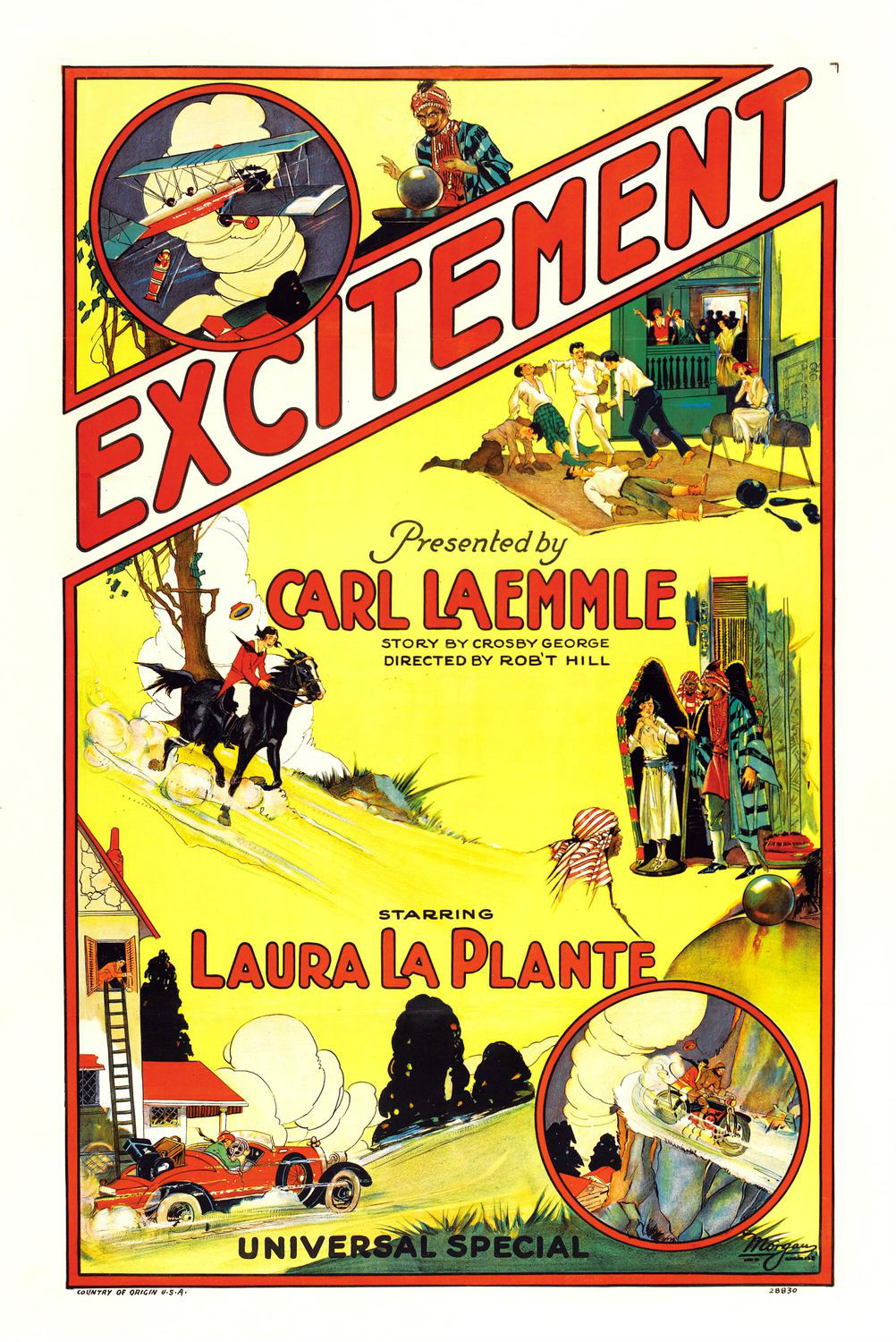
- Directed by: Robert F. Hill
- Written by: Hugh Hoffman
- Story by: Crosby George
- Produced by: Carl Laemmle
- Starring: Laura La Plante
- Cinematography: Jackson Rose
- Distributed by: Universal Pictures
- Release date: April 13, 1924
- Running time: 50 minutes
- Country: United States
- Language: Silent (English intertitles)

Excitement is a 1924 American silent comedy film directed by Robert F. Hill and starring Laura La Plante. It was produced and distributed by Universal Pictures.

== Plot ==
As described in a film magazine review, Nila Lyons, pretty and mischievous, is a worry to her parents, who want her to get married. She leaves home declaring that she will choose a spouse. After going through varied adventures, she marries a young chap who kisses and wins her when their motorcycle dashes into a lake. They agree to separate for a month each year. After Nila has passed through a number of exciting experiences, she settles down with her husband.

== Cast ==
- Laura La Plante as Nila Lyons
- Edward Hearn as Arthur Drew
- William Welsh as Hiram Lyons
- Frances Raymond as Mrs. Lyons
- Fred DeSilva as Eric Orton
- Margaret Cullington as Violet Smith
- Al Hart as Abner Smith
- Rolfe Sedan as Willie Winkle
- Bert Roach as Toby
- Stanley Blystone as Freddie
- Lon Poff as Roger Cove
- George Fisher as Chester Robbins
- Fay Tincher as Mammy

== Preservation ==
With no copies of Excitement found in any film archives, it is a lost film.
