= The Texan (1920 film) =

1920 film

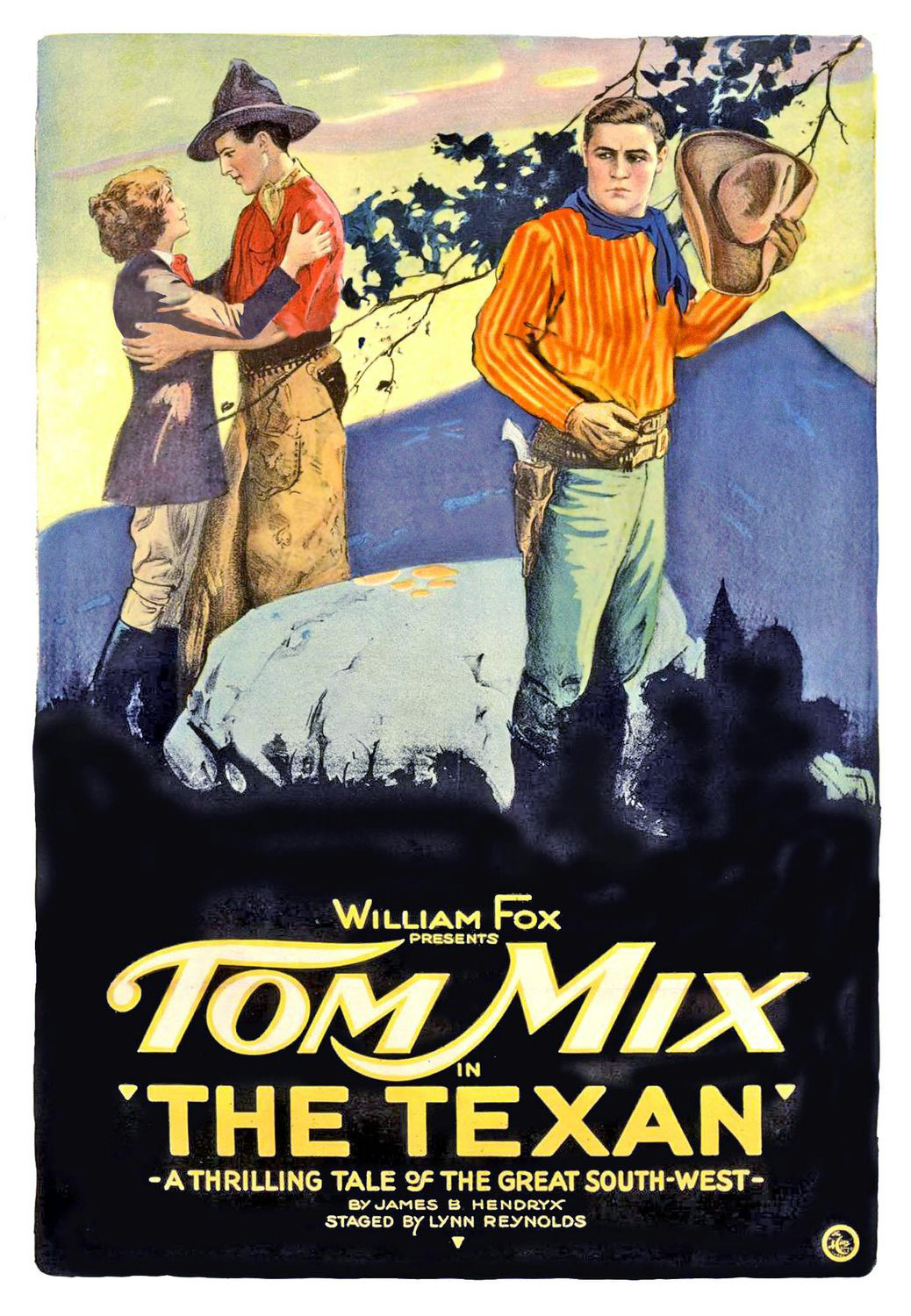
- Film poster
- Directed by: Lynn Reynolds; George H. Webster (ass't director)
- Written by: Lynn Reynolds; Jules Furthman
- Based on: The Texan by James B. Hendryx
- Produced by: William Fox; Tom Mix
- Starring: Tom Mix; Gloria Hope
- Cinematography: Frank Good
- Distributed by: Fox Film
- Release date: October 1920
- Running time: 5 reels
- Country: United States
- Languages: Silent; English intertitles

The Texan is a 1920 American silent Western comedy film directed by Lynn Reynolds and starring Tom Mix. It was produced and released by the Fox Film Company. The story was filmed again in 1930 by Paramount as The Texan with Gary Cooper.

Full film (Danish print)

== Cast ==
- Tom Mix as Tex Benton
- Gloria Hope as Alice Marcum
- Robert Walker as Winthrop Endicott
- Charles K. French as Wolf River Mayor
- Sid Jordan as Jack Purdy
- Pat Chrisman as Bat, a Half-Breed

== Preservation status ==
Copies of The Texan are held at Filmmuseum Netherlands aka EYE Institut and The Danish Film Institute.

== See also ==
- List of Fox Film films
- Tom Mix filmography
