= His Bitter Pill =

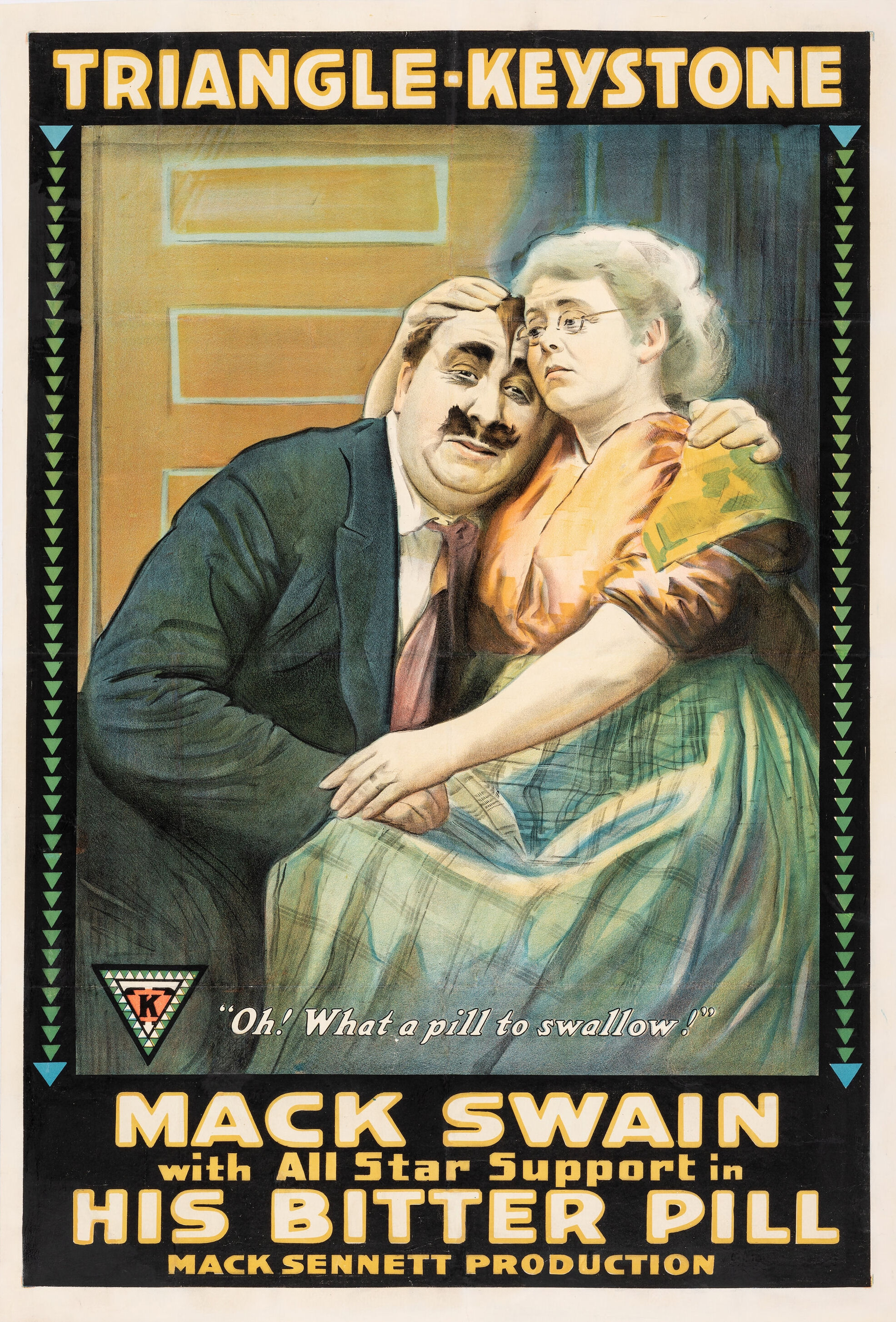
- lobby poster with Mack Swain and Ella Haines(akaMary Boland)
- Directed by: Fred Fishback (ass't Herman C. Raymaker)
- Produced by: Keystone Studios
- Starring: Mack Swain; Louella Maxam
- Cinematography: J. R. Lockwood
- Distributed by: Triangle Film Corporation
- Release date: April 30, 1916
- Running time: 2 reels
- Country: United States
- Language: Silent(English titles)

His Bitter Pill is a 1916 silent short film produced by the Keystone Film Company and released by Triangle Film Corporation. It was directed by Fred Fishback. It stars Mack Swain, Louella Maxam and Ella Haines(Mary Boland using a nom de plume). This is a surviving film extant in several collections.

== Synopsis ==
Jim(Mack Swain) is a hulking sheriff in a western town. His sweetheart is Nell(Louella Maxam) whom he endeavours to impress. His mother(Ella Haines,Mary Boland) is a part of his life and herself is a rambunctious soul. Competing with Jim for Nell's attention is his rival Dan(Edgar Kennedy)

== Note ==
The part of Jim's mother is played by Mary Boland using an assumed name Ella Haines. Upon research Haines is billed elsewhere as Mary Haines. Neither women have any bio on them either in sources like Silent Film Necrology by Eugene Vazzana or the IMDb website. They are just listed. Both women are non-existent. Since this film exists, it is available for study. It is Boland's countenance on the film's poster.

Swain was six years older than Boland though they play mother and son. Boland made this film while in the midst of a Broadway career and was heading to a contract with Triangle to do feature films. This short is a warmup along with one other which is lost. Thus began Boland's silent film career. Boland would make her last silent feature around 1920. She would return in the early 1930s in the talkie era and achieve much bigger acclaim in sound feature comedies.

== Cast ==
- Mack Swain as Jim
- Louella Maxam as Nell
- Ella Haines as Jim's Mother (*aka Mary Boland)
- Edgar Kennedy as Diamond Dan, Jim's Rival
- Tom Kennedy as Dan's Henchman
- Joey Jacobs as The Widow's Son
- William Hauber as The Bar Fighter (aka Bill Hauber)
- Rudy Unholz as The Saloon Waiter

unbilled

- Billy Gilbert as Barfly
- Shorty Hamilton as Bantam Cowboy
- Malcolm St. Clair as Barfly
