= Margaret Cullington =

American actress (1885–1925)

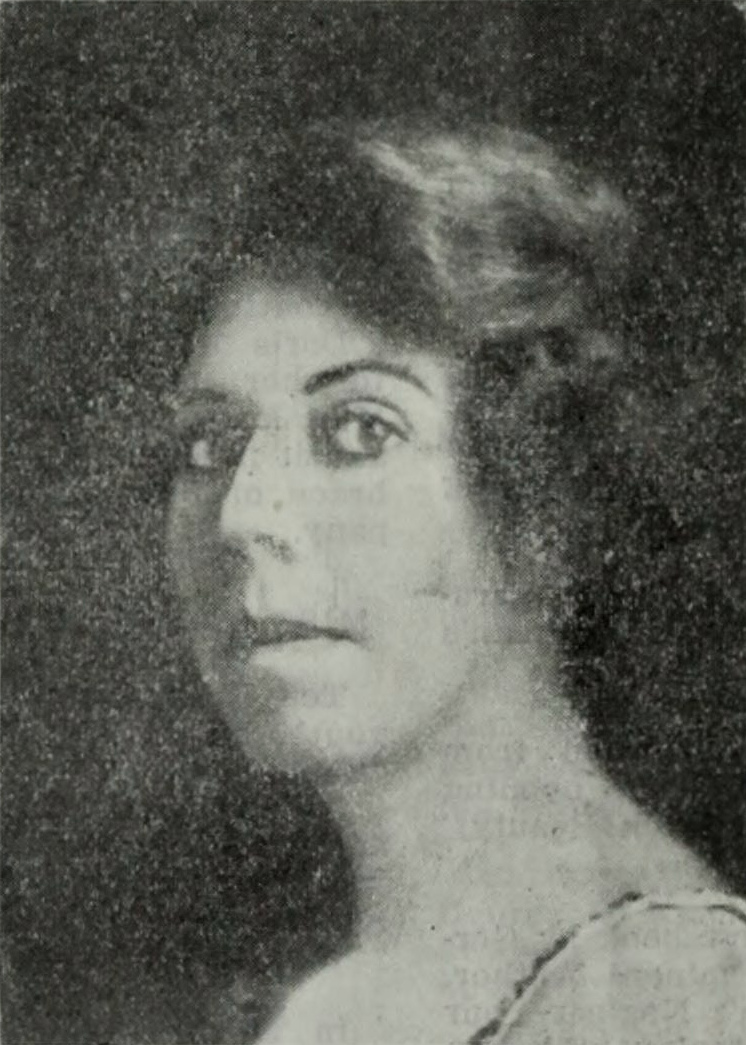

Margaret Cullington (1885–1925) was an American actress. Born in New Rochelle, New York, she was an overlooked character player who made her debut in 1916 doing shorts for Universal and supporting George Ovey in Cub Comedies, sometimes with her first husband, Louis Fitzroy. She played with him in A Merry Mix-up (1916) and Jerry's Strategem (1916). She soon appeared in features like Betty Takes a Hand (1918), Wolves of the Border (1923), and Excitement. She worked mostly in short comedies, and she worked on a regular basis in Christie Comedies and Reggie Morris Speed Comedies for Arrow. Her only major starring role was as Maggie in the three Bringing Up Father two reelers by Al Christies, which were produced in 1920. She died on 18 July 1925. According to her Variety obituary, her second husband, Lieutenant William Fowler, was killed in a plane crash three years before. The obituary said his death led to hers. She left a fourteen-year-old son.

== Selected filmography ==
- Little Red Decides (1918)
- 3 Gold Coins (1920)
- Tropical Love (1921)
- The Son of Wallingford (1921)
- Excitement (1924)
