= Louella Maxam =

American actress (1891–1970)

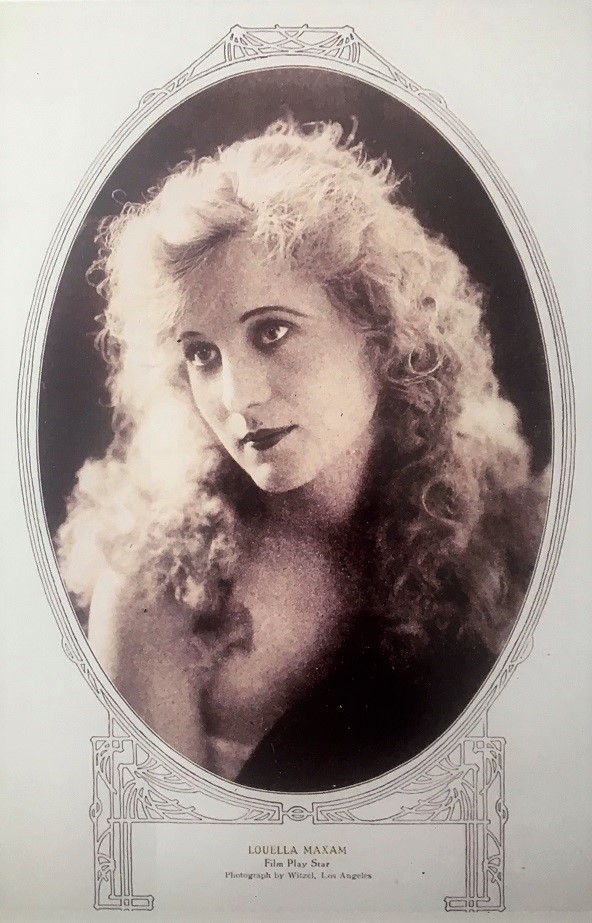
- The Red Book Magazine, 1917
- Born: June 10, 1891 (Note: In various records, the year cited for Maxam's birth ranges from 1891 to 1896. Only a death year is inscribed on her grave marker, but film-industry directories in 1916, 1917, and 1918 cite 1894 as her birth year. However, her noted age in the 1910 United States census and on the April 23, 1911, birth certificate of her child, Norma Marguerite Keller, establish 1891 as Maxam's actual birth year.); St. Augustine, Florida, U.S.
- Died: September 3, 1970 (aged 79); Burbank, California, U.S.
- Occupation: Actress
- Years active: 1913–1921
- Spouses: John Joseph Keller (m. 1910; div. 1914) William Brunton (m. 1915; div. 1920) Modie (before 1930)
- Children: 1

Louella Maxam (also credited as Lola, Lula, Lulu, and Luella Maxim; June 10, 1891 – September 3, 1970) was an American actress who performed in over 50 silent films from 1913 until 1921. She was often cast in comedies and Westerns, most notably being identified in 1915 as a "leading lady" in a series of shorts starring Tom Mix, who during the silent and early sound eras was promoted as the "Cowboy King of Hollywood". Later, she was a female lead in other films for various studios, including several productions featuring another early cowboy star, Franklyn Farnum. Following her departure from acting, Maxam worked in county and municipal government in California, including service with the Burbank police department, where in 1943 she was hired as that city's first "police woman".

== Early life ==
Born in Florida in 1891, Louella Marguerite Maxam was the elder child of Sue E. Maxam, a native of Illinois. Little is known about Louella's father. According to government records, he was a native of Rhode Island and died prior to April 1910, when the federal census identifies Sue as a widow. Louella later attended public schools in St. Louis, Missouri, before moving with her mother and brother Lauren to California. The federal census of 1910 shows that in Los Angeles Sue earned income for her family by renting rooms in their house to several boarders, and that Louella—just shy of 19 years old at the time—was employed as a bookkeeper in a nearby grocery store. Within a few years, however, young "Lula" found work in Hollywood's rapidly growing film industry, initially performing in serials and in stand-alone shorts as an extra and in other small uncredited parts.

== Film career ==
By the latter half of 1913 Maxam was cast as a supporting character in The Adventures of Kathlyn, Hollywood's "first cliffhanger serial". The absence of any 1914 releases in Maxam's known filmography suggests that more substantial roles continued to elude her until the following year, when she began to find steady, credited work in Westerns. In that genre she soon became closely associated on screen with cowboy star Tom Mix, and in 1915 she was recognized as a "leading lady" in his popular productions.

=== Tom Mix shorts at Selig ===
Maxam performed in at least 13 of Tom Mix's films. (Note: One of the 1915 Tom Mix shorts with Maxam was not released by the Selig until January 1917. See "Brief Stories of the Week's Film Releases / The Luck That Jealousy Brought", Motography, February 3, 1917, p. 269. Retrieved June 12, 2019?) In one of those Westerns, A Child of the Prairie, Maxam's own three-and-a-half-year-old daughter Norma is featured and identified in 1915 trade publications as a "Los Angeles product" and "the youngest member of the Selig Polyscope Company of players". (Note: Norma M. Keller's birth certificate and the federal census of 1920 confirm the child to be Louella's daughter. The latter documents Norma living with Sue Maxam and identifies her as Sue's granddaughter.) In its April 23 issue that year, The Photoplayers' Weekly describes "Baby Norma Maxam" on the set:

She is at the studio on every possible occasion and is beloved and petted by all the cowboys, whom she loves in return...she is too fearless around horses and all animals. While working in "A Child of The Prairie," she gave the company a fright by grabbing hold of the tail of the big horse Mr. Mix was riding, just as he was about to dash into a scene.... (Note: The 1915 film A Child of the Prairie should not be confused with the 1913 Tom Mix short The Child of the Prairies in which Maxam was not cast. See Wikimedia Commons image of the 1913 film's release flier, which includes cast listing.)

Also in April 1915, the Chicago-based trade journal Motography reviewed another Tom Mix Western, The Conversion of Smiling Tom. In its assessment of the short, the publication recognizes Maxam's contributions to the growing quality of the cowboy star's films. "Mix", states Motography, "is ably supported by Louella Maxam" as Smiling Tom's love interest. The journal then adds, "These two players and the others appearing in supporting roles make the film a convincing one by their acting." In addition to the media's recognition of her acting talent, The Photoplayers' Weekly credited her professional success, especially in Westerns, to additional attributes she possessed, namely "her absolute lack of fear" in performing stunts and her excellent "horsewomanship".

Maxam's association with Tom Mix continued to increase her popularity with moviegoers. Photoplayers' Weekly once again highlights Maxam in its July 8, 1915 issue, featuring a portrait of the actress on its front cover, an image that carries the tagline "Star of Western Dramas and Comedies". Yet, despite her screen success with Mix, she declined the offer in the summer of 1915 to relocate from California to work at a new studio in Las Vegas, New Mexico, one being constructed specifically for the production of the cowboy star's lucrative films. "Miss Louella Maxam", Photoplayers' Weekly reported, "one of the best known leading women in screen dramas of western life, refuses to sacrifice her home in Glendale, which is the reason she did not accompany Thomas Mix." The Los Angeles publication then added, "the talented young woman is considering other offers".

=== Universal and Keystone ===
Later in 1915, after declining the move to New Mexico and leaving Selig, Maxam began working for Universal, performing there in Her Prey, Manna, The Phantom Fortune, The Measure of Leon Du Bray, and The Fair God of Sun Island, which was filmed on location in Laguna Beach. In late November, Louella spent two weeks on location again with other "Universalites" in the snowy "Bear Lake regions" of Southern California, filming and co-starring with Sydney Ayres in John o' the Mountains, a three-reel "Canadian Northwest" drama written by F. McGrew Willis.

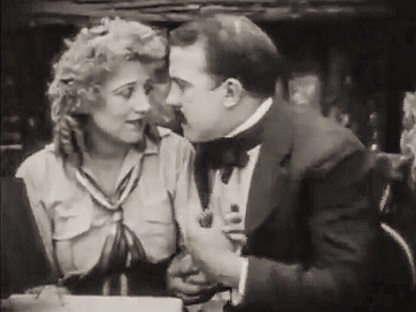
Maxam as "Nell" with Edgar Kennedy as "Diamond Dan" in the Keystone two-reel short His Bitter Pill, 1916

In January 1916, after completing John o' the Mountains and The Sting of Conscience for Universal, Maxam signed a contract with Keystone Studios to be in a series of shorts. One of those releases was His Bitter Pill, a parody of Western films in which she co-stars with Mack Swain. In May 1916, Keystone "loaned" Maxam to Signal Film Corporation so she could accompany her husband, fellow actor William Burton, to Honolulu and Hilo, Hawaii to film the five-reeler The Diamond Runners. Maxam resumed her work at Keystone by late July and was cast in His Lying Heart, Vampire Ambrose, and Ambrose's Rapid Rise. While filming Ambrose's Rapid Rise, in a scene of a burning schoolhouse, the hair of actor Tom Kennedy caught fire. It is reported that when Maxam noticed "the cruel flames were licking up locks from his noble brow, she made a dash at him with a bucket of water and put him out." After that short's release in September 1916, Motion Picture News published an extensive "Motion Picture Studio Directory" in which Maxam's entry includes information about her life, some of her films, leisure activities, physical traits, and even her home address:

MAXAM, Louella, leading woman, Keystone...Recreations, riding, swimming, all out-door sports, music, and domestic science. Hght., 5 ft. 6 in., wght., 130; blonde hair, blue eyes. Home ad., 138 E. 2nd st., Glendale, Cal. Studio ad., Keystone, Los Angeles, Cal.

Maxam's contract with Keystone was a relatively brief one. In early November 1916, shortly after Motion Picture News published the noted directory, Motography announced she had left Keystone "to join her husband [Brunton], who is one of the Signal players." The widely read fan magazine Photoplay subsequently offered a less discreet explanation for Maxam's separation from Keystone, reporting that she was "axed" as part of cost-cutting measures and widespread restructuring within the motion picture industry:

The retrenchment axe was swung with vigor at many of the studios during [October], the casualties having been very large at American in Santa Barbara and at Keystone. Harry Gribbon and Louella Maxam were among the victims at the latter....

=== Selig, American, and Triangle ===
After leaving Keystone, Maxam returned to Selig and was cast in Only a Rose, Out of the Shadows, Paradise for a Day, and several other shorts through mid-1917, mostly in minor roles. One of the few co-starring credits she had at Selig during those months was in Won in the Stretch, a one-reeler. Possibly in a move to obtain work again in longer, more complex films, Maxam accepted roles in several five-reel productions with the American Film Company and Triangle Film Corporation during the latter half of 1917 and 1918. In one of those films, Because of a Woman, Maxam is one of three major supporting characters. Peter Milne, film critic for Motion Picture News, gives a rather vague assessment of the actors' performances in his September 22, 1917, review: "The principal roles are handled by Jack Livingston, Louella Maxam and George Ches[e]bro, a trio who distinguish themselves averagely."

For the American Film Company, Maxam performed with J. Gordon Russell in portraying a poor starving couple in The Mantle of Charity, a five-reeler initially released for preview in September 1918. In the Western Deuce Duncan, another five-reeler released in November 1918, she co-stars with William Desmond. The influential entertainment paper Variety gives that film a mixed review, as it does the performance of "Luella Maxim": "Miss Maxim...makes a pleasing appearance and acts with intelligence, although she could get more out of her part than she does."

=== Canyon Pictures ===
Louella, also billed as Lola Maxam, performed her final roles co-starring in a series of Westerns produced in 1919 and 1920 by Canyon Pictures Corporation, films that include The Two Doyles, The Desert Rat, and Brother Bill. The lead in those two-reelers was Franklyn Farnum, who in the decade after World War I became another cowboy star of Hollywood. In October 1920—after Maxam's co-starring role with Farnum in Vengeance and the Girl—trade publications advertised six more of Canyon's popular Westerns. Other actresses, however, were cast in those films, including Helene Chadwick and Mary Anderson. Maxam left the film industry by 1921, a departure date that is corroborated by her complete absence from the 1921 edition of the Motion Picture Studio Directory and Trade Annual. One 2019 online reference includes Maxam, without a cited source, as a cast member in the May 1921 Canyon release The Raiders, a lost film that starred Farnum and Claire Windsor. Yet, no review, cast listing, or news item alluding to Maxam's participation in The Raiders has been found in a 1921 film-industry publication. In fact, in its disparaging review of The Raiders in July that year, Variety refers to only "the lone woman [Claire Windsor] of the cast".

== Post-film career ==
Maxam remained in California after her work in motion pictures. During the 1920s and throughout the 1930s, she was employed by Los Angeles County as a welfare worker or "investigator". She continued in public service into the 1940s although she moved from a county position to a municipal job. In 1943 Maxam joined the police department in Burbank, becoming that city's first female employee in law enforcement.

== Personal life and death ==
Maxam married three times. In 1910 in Los Angeles, she wed John Joseph Keller, a bookkeeper and a native of Chicago. The couple had a daughter, Norma Marguerite, born on April 23, 1911. After divorcing Keller prior to 1915, Maxam married actor William Brunton, a union that lasted until 1920. Information is scant about her third husband, whom she married sometime in the 1920s. His surname was Modie, and census records indicate he died before April 1930, when Louella is listed as a widow and living with her mother in a rental home at 2446 Hidalgo Avenue in Los Angeles. By then and for the remainder of her life, she identified herself as Louella Maxam Modie. She also continued to live with her mother until Sue's death in December 1957.

Louella died of undisclosed causes in September 1970 in a hospital in Burbank, California and was interred at Forest Lawn Memorial Park in nearby Hollywood Hills. When Maxam's only child, Merna M. Levack, died in 1996, her body was placed next to Louella's with a memorial plaque inscribed "Devoted Daughter". California death records document that Merna Marguerite [Modie] Levack was born April 23, 1911, in Los Angeles—the same day, year, location, and of the same parents as cited on the birth certificate of Norma Maguerite Keller. That certificate also verifies Norma's delivery as a singular birth, not a twin. Those records and Louella's gravesite memorial therefore indicate that Merna and Norma were the same person. Why "Baby Norma" later altered her birth name to Merna is unknown.

== Partial filmography ==
The following list is compiled from various sources, including news items and reviews in film-industry trade papers and journals published between 1913 and 1921, Larry Langman's A Guide to Silent Westerns (1992), and Buck Rainey's Sweethearts of the Sage: Biographies and Filmographies of 258 Actresses Appearing in Western Movies (1992):

- The Adventures of Kathlyn (1913)
- A Child of the Prairie (1915) Mrs. Martin / Ruth, her daughter
- The Man from Texas (1915) Tex's sister
- The Stagecoach Driver and the Girl (1915)-Edythe
- Ma's Girls (1915)-Rose
- Getting a Start in Life (1915)-Elizabeth Spunk
- Mrs. Murphy's Cooks (1915)
- The Conversion of Smiling Tom (1915)-Maude
- An Arizona Wooing (1915)-Jean Dixon
- Saved by Her Horse (1915)-Nell Dodge
- A Matrimonial Boomerang (1915)-Grace
- The Heart of the Sheriff (1915)-Grace Martin
- With the Aid of the Law (1915)-Rose Butler
- The Child, the Dog, and the Villain (1915)
- Foreman of Bar Z Ranch (1915)-Fern Watkins
- The Taking of Mustang Pete (1915)-Ruth Bradley
- His Good Name (1915)-Mrs. William Brunton
- The Phantom Fortune (1915)-Dixie Coday
- In the Sunset Country (1915)-Nan Thorpe
- Her Slight Mistake (1915)
- Her Prey (1915)-Grace
- The Fair God of Sun Island (1915)-Alice
- Manna (1915)-Maggie
- The Measure of Leon DuBray (1915)-Janet
- John o' the Mountains (1915)
- A Movie Star (1916)-Nell
- An Oily Scoundrel (1916)-station agent's daughter
- Bucking Society (1916)-Shorty's sweetheart
- His Bitter Pill (1916)-Nell
- The Diamond Runners (1916)-Helen, the maid
- The Sting of Conscience (1916)-Anne McDonald
- His Lying Heart (1916)-manicurist
- Vampire Ambrose (1916)
- Ambrose's Rapid Rise (1916)-schoolteacher
- Only a Rose (1916) - Kate Phelps
- The Gilded Son (1916)
- Out of the Shadows (1916) - Rose Morton
- The Saddle Girth (1917) - Mary
- Won in the Stretch (1917) - Mary Hughes
- Because of a Woman (1917) - Muriel
- The Lost Express (1917 serial)
- The Luck That Jealousy Brought (1917) - Rose
- The Mantle of Charity (1918) - Anna Houlahan
- When Pals Fall Out (1918) - Anne
- Deuce Duncan (1918) - Ann Tyson
- Uphill Climb (1919) - Josephine Marsden
- The Two Doyles (1919) - Bessie Brown
- Brother Bill (1919) - Ruth Salisbury
- The Desert Rat (1919) - Frisco Sadie
- Vengeance and the Girl (1920) - Henrietta Mitchell
