= The Rough Diamond =

1921 film directed by Edward Sedgwick

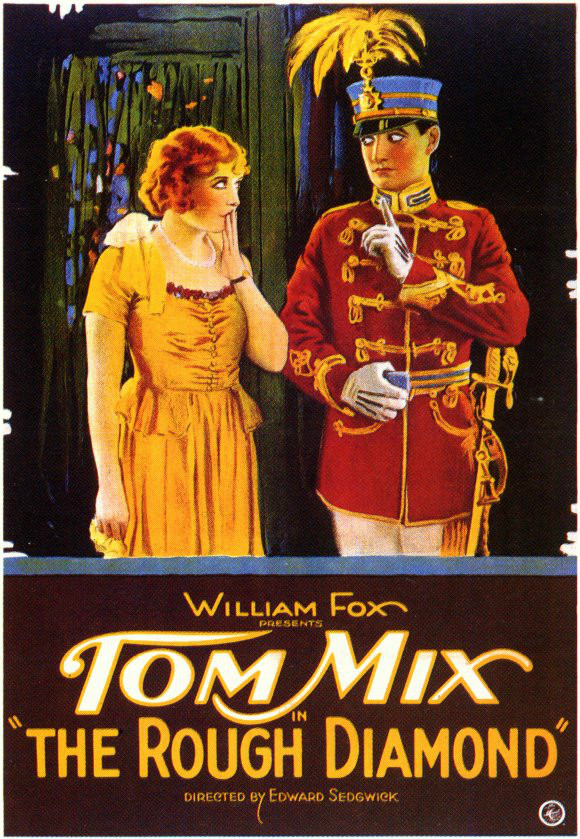
- Directed by: Edward Sedgwick
- Written by: Tom Mix; Edward Sedgwick; Ralph Spence
- Produced by: William Fox
- Starring: Tom Mix; Eva Novak; Hector V. Sarno
- Cinematography: Benjamin H. Kline
- Edited by: Ralph Spence
- Production company: Fox Film Corporation
- Distributed by: Fox Film Corporation
- Release date: October 30, 1921
- Running time: 50 minutes
- Country: United States
- Languages: Silent; English intertitles

The Rough Diamond is a lost 1921 American silent Western comedy film directed by Edward Sedgwick and starring Tom Mix, Eva Novak and Hector V. Sarno.

== Cast ==
- Tom Mix as Hank Sherman
- Eva Novak as Gloria Gómez
- Hector V. Sarno as Emeliano Gómez
- Ed Brady as Pedro Sachet
- Sid Jordan as Manuel Garcia

== Bibliography ==
- Connelly, Robert B. The Silents: Silent Feature Films, 1910-36, Volume 40, Issue 2. December Press, 1998.
- Munden, Kenneth White. The American Film Institute Catalog of Motion Pictures Produced in the United States, Part 1. University of California Press, 1997.
- Solomon, Aubrey. The Fox Film Corporation, 1915-1935: A History and Filmography. McFarland, 2011.
