= Western Blood =

1918 film

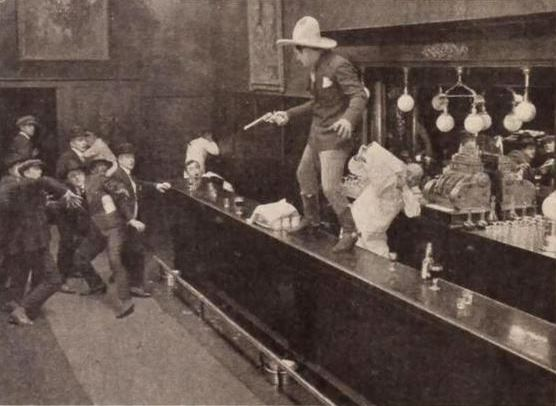
- Directed by: Lynn Reynolds
- Written by: Lynn Reynolds
- Produced by: William Fox
- Starring: Tom Mix
- Distributed by: Fox Film Corporation
- Release date: April 14, 1918
- Running time: 5 reels
- Country: United States
- Languages: Silent; English intertitles

Western Blood is a lost 1918 American silent Western film directed by Lynn Reynolds and starring Tom Mix. It was produced and released by Fox Film Corporation.

== Cast ==
- Tom Mix - Tex Wilson
- Victoria Forde - Roberta Stephens
- Frank Clark - Col. Stephens
- Barney Furey - Wallace Payton
- Pat Chrisman - Juan
- Buck Jones - Cowboy (* as Buck Gebhardt)

== See also ==
- 1937 Fox vault fire
- List of lost films
