= Rough Riding Romance =

1919 film

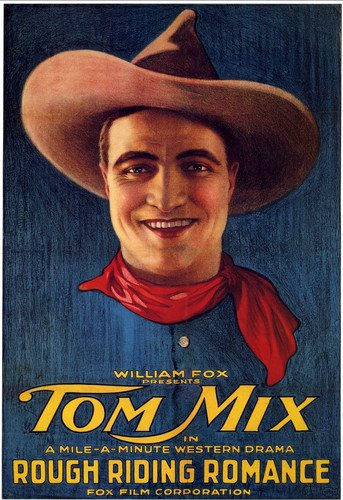
- Directed by: Arthur Rosson
- Written by: Charles Kenyon
- Produced by: William Fox
- Starring: Tom Mix
- Cinematography: Fred LeRoy Granville
- Distributed by: Fox Film
- Release date: August 24, 1919
- Running time: 50 minutes
- Country: United States
- Languages: Silent; English intertitles

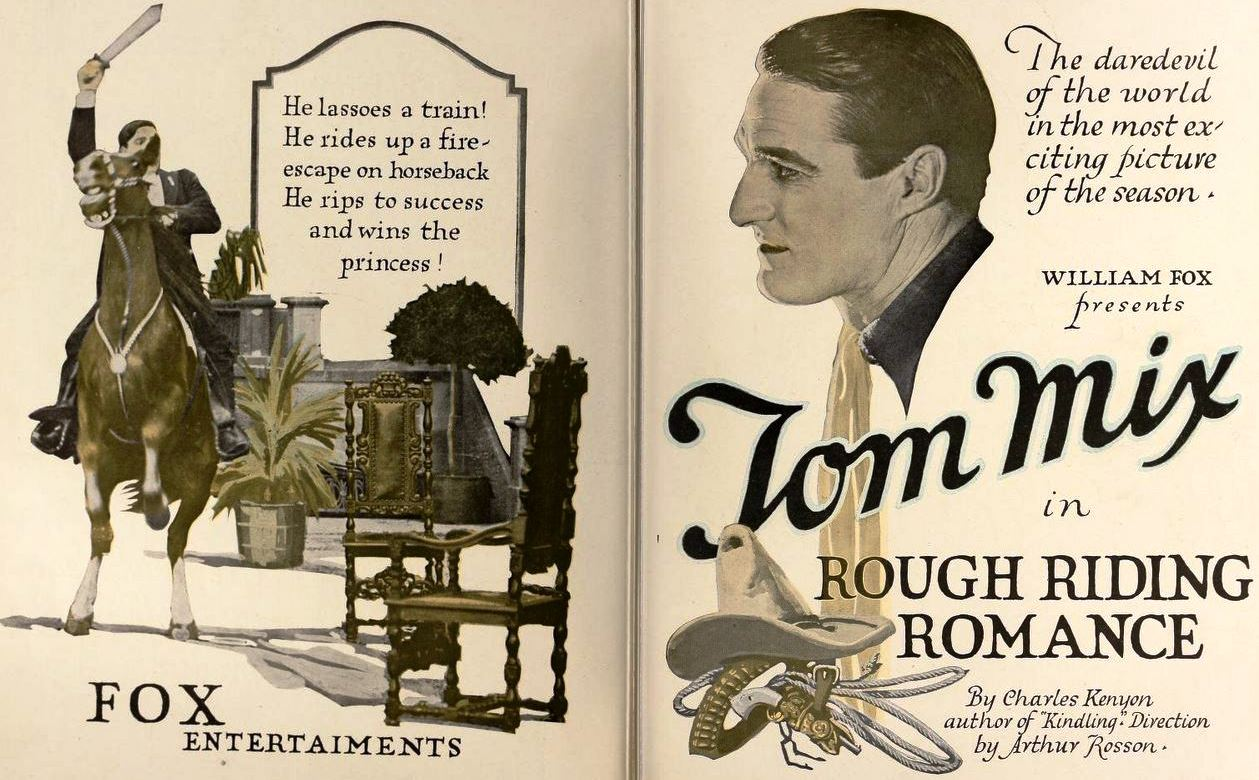
Advertisement for film

Rough Riding Romance is a lost 1919 American silent Western film directed by Arthur Rosson and starring Tom Mix. It was produced and distributed by Fox Film Corporation.

== Plot ==
As described in a film magazine, Phineas Dobbs, cowboy and dairyman, becomes rich when oil is discovered on his land. His first thought is to give a party with the whole town as his guests. The party is at its height when a mysterious and beautiful young woman with two frock-coated escorts alight from a nearby stalled train who are menaced by the town badman. Disposing of the bad man in his best style, Phineas takes to the open country on his horse. The train passes and the lady throws him a note from the window, asking him to follow and rescue her. His quest takes him to San Francisco and thence to an estate in the San Mateo hills, where a secret society of foreign noblemen are seeking to force the young woman to marry one of their members. Her father is held prisoner and his life is to be the price of her refusal. Phineas mixes in and, with the help of his trusted steed, effects the rescue of the young woman, who turns out to be a princess and her father a king. Sometime later, after he has returned to the ranch, the young woman appears and they are married.

== Cast ==
- Tom Mix as Phineas Dobbs
- Juanita Hansen as The Princess
- Pat Chrisman as Curley
- Spottiswoode Aitken as The King
- Jack Nelson as Pietro The Spy
- Sid Jordan as Pat Leary
- Frankie Lee
- Tony as Tom Mix's horse

== Preservation status ==
Only a fragment of the film is preserved at the Library of Congress.

== See also ==
- 1937 Fox vault fire
