= The Golden Thought =

1917 film

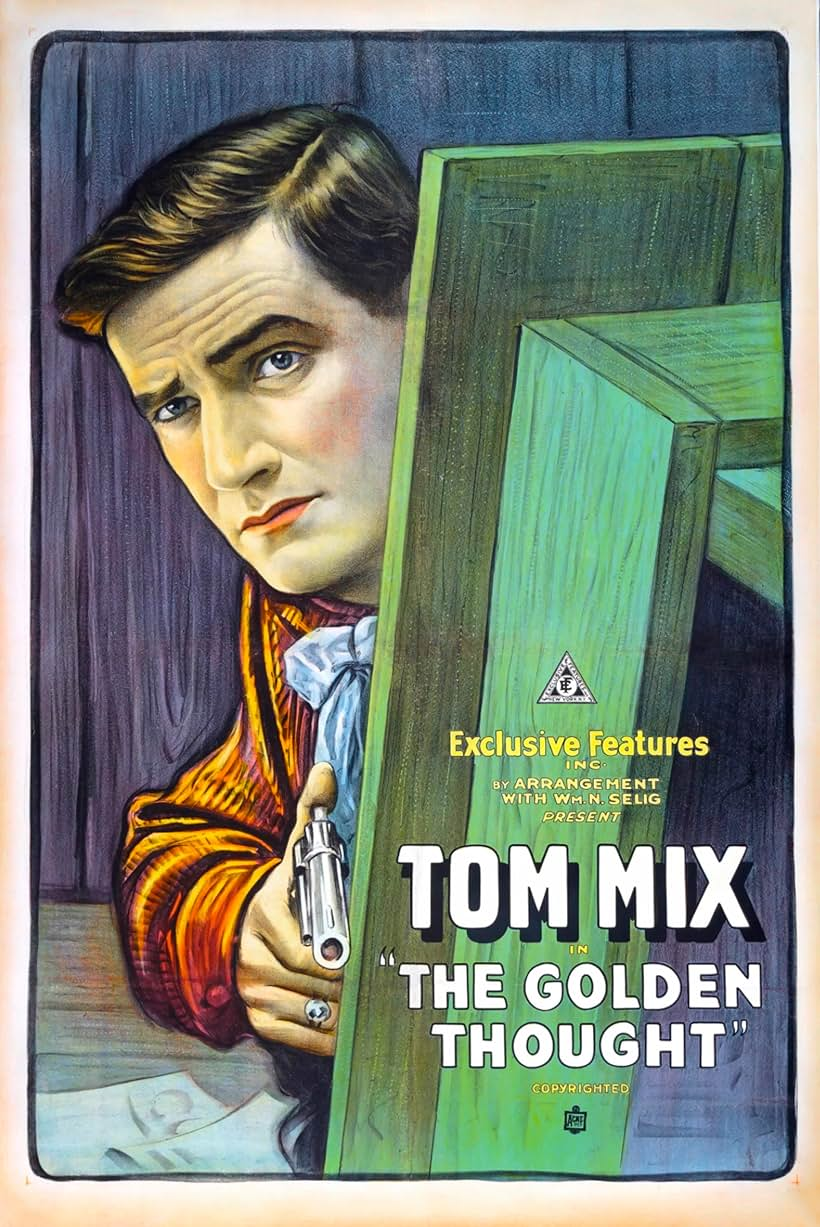
- Directed by: Tom Mix
- Written by: J. A. Lacy
- Produced by: William N. Selig; Selig Polyscope Company
- Starring: Tom Mix; Victoria Forde
- Distributed by: General Film Company
- Release date: January 6, 1917
- Running time: 3 reels
- Country: United States
- Languages: Silent; English intertitles

The Golden Thought is a 1917 American silent Western short film directed by and starring Tom Mix. It was produced by the Selig Polyscope Company and released through the General Film Company. A print survives in the George Eastman House.

It was re-released in 1924 after being expanded into feature form. It is unclear whether this expanded version survives.

== Cast ==
- Tom Mix as Tom Daton
- Victoria Forde as Bess Jackson
- Barney Furey as Gene Hammond
- Lillian Clark as Estella Hammond (billed as Lily Clark)
- Sid Jordan as Doc Breede
- Pat Chrisman as Bill Blevins
- Lillian Wade
