= The Man from Texas (1915 film) =

1915 film

- Directed by: Tom Mix
- Written by: Donald I. Buchanan; Tom Mix
- Starring: Tom Mix
- Edited by: Donald I. Buchanan
- Distributed by: Selig Polyscope Company
- Release date: March 2, 1915
- Running time: 41 minutes
- Country: United States
- Languages: Silent; English intertitles

The Man from Texas is a 1915 American Western film, directed by and starring Tom Mix. The film was considered to be lost, but has been found and digitally remastered. It was shot near Prescott, Arizona by William Selig of the Selig Polyscope Company.

== Cast ==
- Tom Mix as Texas
- Ed Brady (uncredited)
- Goldie Colwell (uncredited)
- Bessie Eyton as Moya Dalton (uncredited)
- Hoot Gibson as Deputy (uncredited)
- Sid Jordan as John Hargrave (uncredited)
- Louella Maxam (uncredited)

The Man From Texas (1915)
