= Victoria Forde =

American actress (1896–1964)

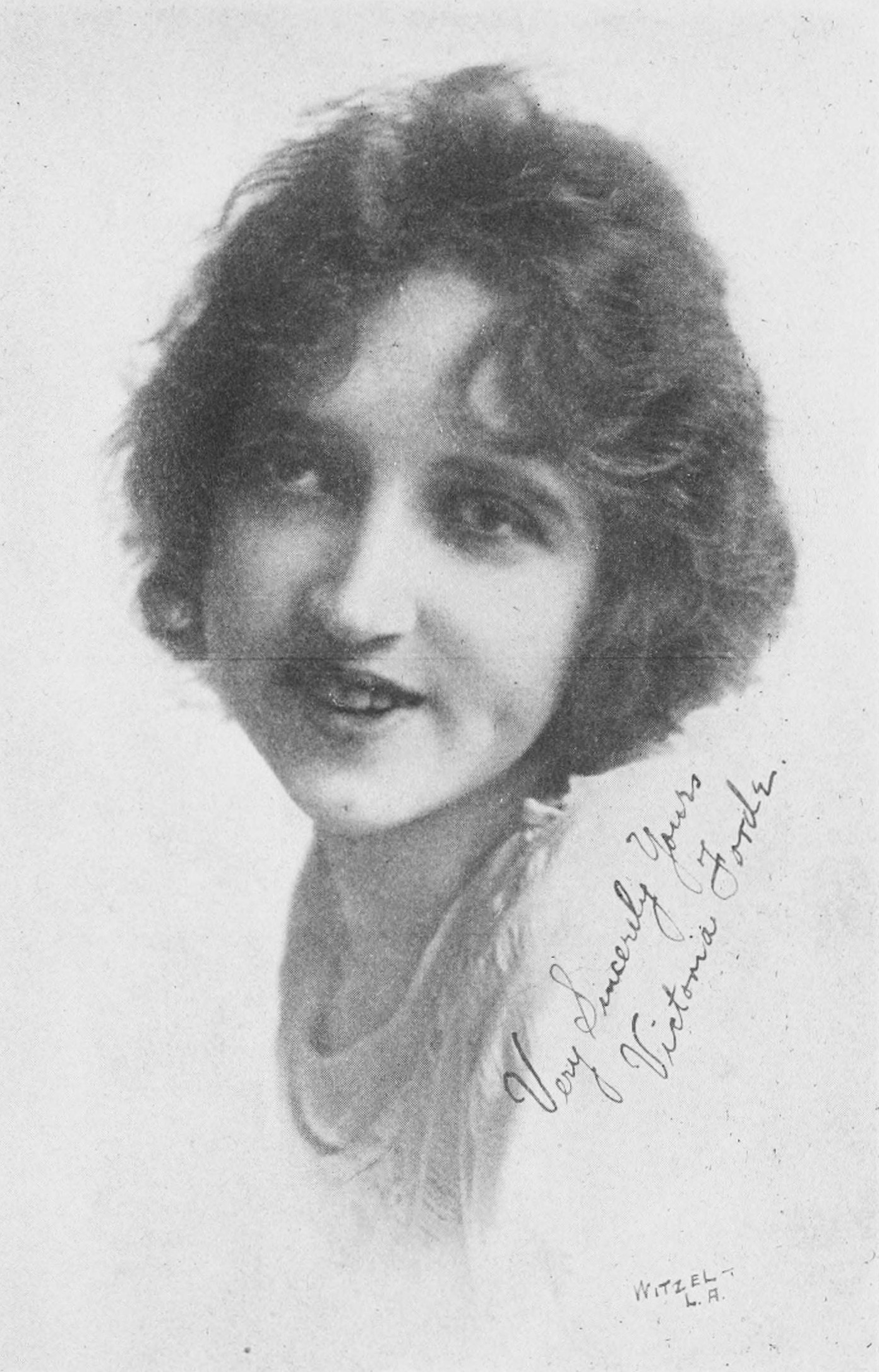
- Forde in 1915
- Born: April 21, 1896; New York City, U.S.
- Died: July 24, 1964 (aged 68); Beverly Hills, California, U.S.
- Occupation: Actress
- Spouses: Tom Mix (m. 1918; div. 1932) Manuel A. de Olazabal (m. 1932; div. 1943) Earl H. Robinson (m. 1944; div. 1945)
- Children: Thomasina Mix
- Mother: Eugenie Forde

Victoria Forde (April 21, 1896 – July 24, 1964) was an American silent film actress.

== Biography ==
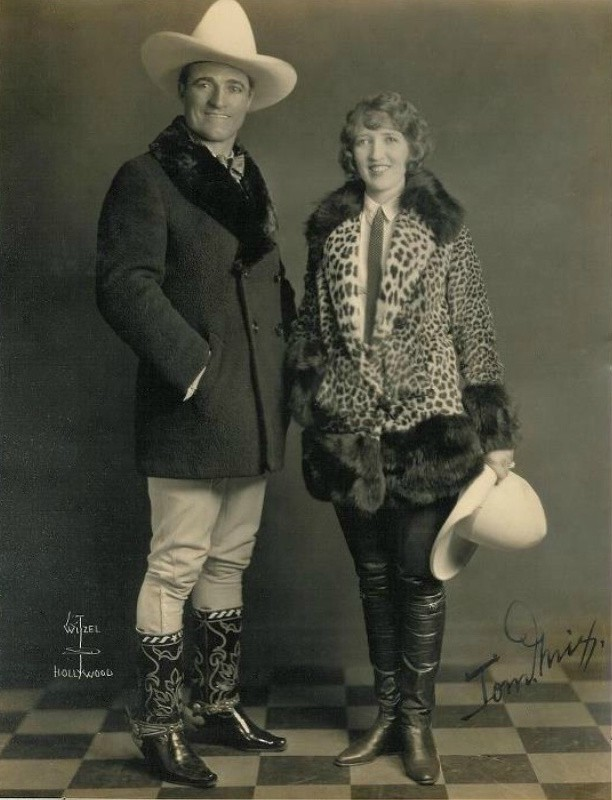
Tom Mix and Victoria Forde in the 1920s

Born in New York City in 1897, Victoria Forde was the daughter of Broadway actress Eugenie Forde who got her into films with Biograph at age 14. In 1912, at age 16, she signed with Nestor Studios to make comedy films under director Al Christie. That same year, her mother made her film debut, appearing with her daughter in A Pair of Jacks (1912). During Forde's five-year stay with Nestor, Al Christie would direct her in one hundred and sixteen short films.

Forde joined Selig Studios and became a star of Western films, frequently performing opposite cowboy actor Tom Mix. A personal relationship developed between them and, in 1917, she and Mix signed with the Fox Film Corporation where they continued to perform together. She became his second wife in 1918; the following year, after having performed in 176 film shorts, she gave up her film career to stay at home with their daughter, Thomasina. They were divorced on December 24, 1930. During their marriage, they wouldn't see much of each other, with Mix insisting that she not visit him on set when he made six to ten films a year.

During a trial in 1924, Mix accused Forde of having shot him in 1924, an injury that he had reported as accidentally self-inflicted. He testified that during an argument Forde threw objects at him before she shot at him five times. One bullet, he said, was removed during an operation after it passed through his left arm and lodged near his spine. Mix's testimony came as he was being sued by Forde in an effort to collect five $10,000 promissory notes.

Forde and Mix would both live lavishly off of Mix's hefty salaries, which would ultimately be a major factor in them losing a great deal of their fortune, as well as their Arizona ranch, by 1929.

On January 1, 1932, Forde married Manuel A. de Olazabal in Tuxedo Park, New York. He was the Argentine consul in San Francisco. Forde married aviator Earl Robinson on May 10, 1944, in South Carolina.

=== Death ===
Forde died in Beverly Hills on July 24, 1964. Being of the Catholic faith she was interred in the Holy Cross Cemetery in Culver City, California.

== Partial filmography ==
- Love in Quarantine (1910)
- When the Heart Calls (1912)
- His Only Son (1912)
- The Yaqui Cur (1913)
- The Battle of Bull Run (1913)
- When Lizzie Got Her Polish (1914)
- The Golden Thought (1917; 1924-rerelease)
- Western Blood (1918)
