= William Fairbanks =

American actor (1894–1945)

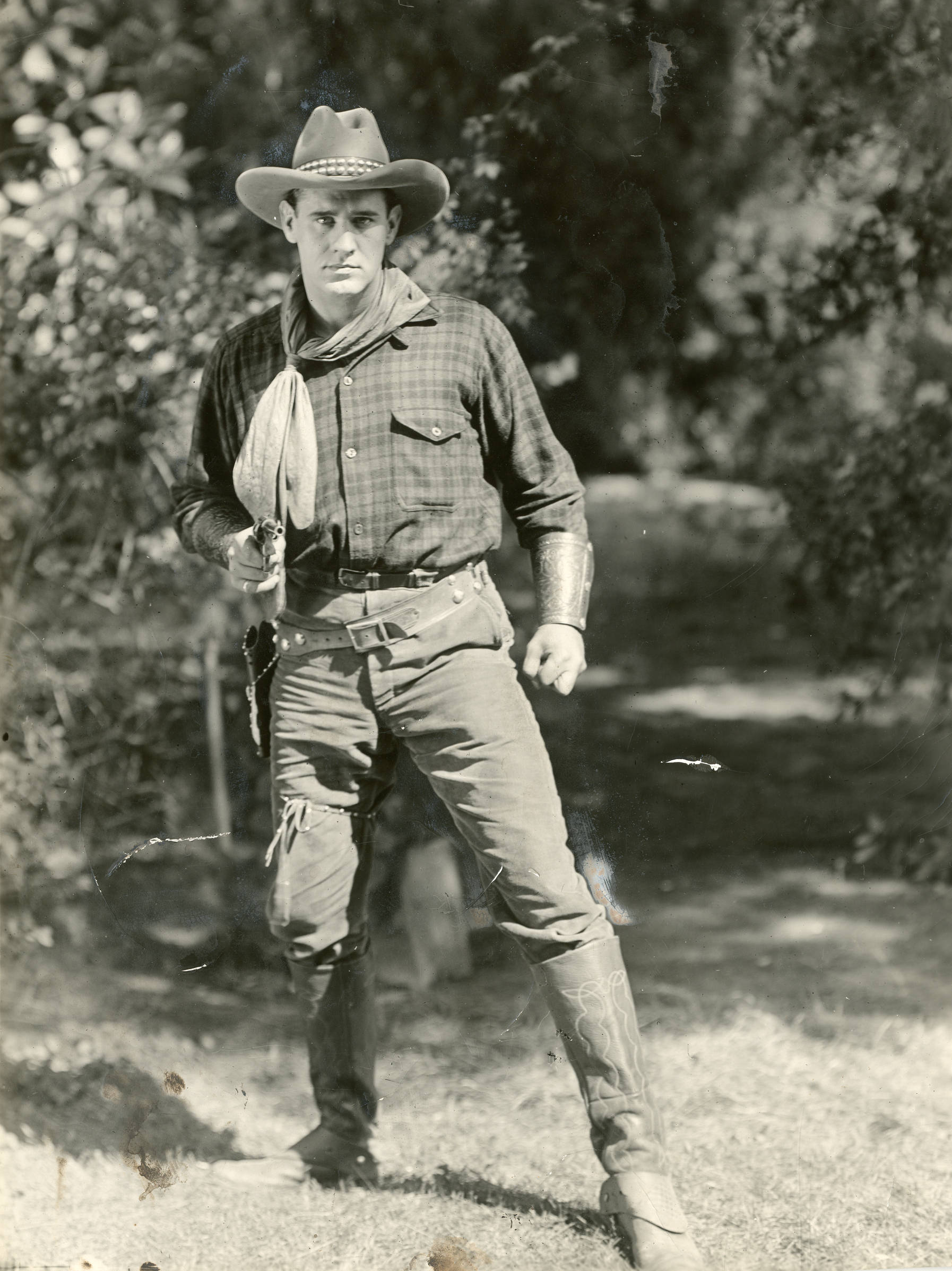
- Fairbanks in 1920
- Born: Carl Ullman; May 24, 1894; St. Louis, Missouri, U.S.
- Died: April 1, 1945 (aged 50); Los Angeles, California, U.S.
- Resting place: Los Angeles National Cemetery
- Occupation: Actor
- Years active: 1916–1928
- Spouse: Edna Whitson (m. 1920; div. 1930)
- Children: 1

William Fairbanks (born Carl Ullman; May 24, 1894 – April 1, 1945) was an American actor. He appeared in over 65 silent era films from 1916 to 1928.

== Biography ==
Fairbanks was born Carl Ullman in St. Louis, Missouri, the son of Charles and Emma E. Ullman. His father was born in Bavaria, Germany, emigrated to the U.S. and became a naturalized citizen, and his mother was born in Illinois. His father was a dry goods merchant and his mother a saleslady at their store. At age 16, Carl worked as a clerk in a stationery store in St. Louis. He attended the St. Louis Military Academy.

His first film role was as Capt. Pierre Thierry in the drama Somewhere in France (1916) starring Louise Glaum and Howard C. Hickman. He was living at 20 Horizon Avenue in Venice, California, where he registered to vote. He appeared in five movies released in 1917, including his role as Dillon in the drama The Little Brother starring Enid Bennett and William Garwood. He was then living at 115 Dudley Avenue in Venice, where he registered for the draft of World War I. He went on to serve as an ensign in the U.S. Navy.

Appearing in only one movie released in 1918, as Stuart Morley in the comedy/drama The Hired Man starring Charles Ray and Charles K. French, he was then absent from the screen for over a year due to the war. In 1920, he lived at 1309 Ocean Front in Santa Monica, and four of his movies were released that year.

He was elevated to star status by producers Phil Goldstone and Ben F. Wilson. His screen name, taken from that of Douglas Fairbanks, whose real surname happened to be the same as his, came about with the release of his starring role in Goldstone's Hearts of the West (1920) with Frances Conrad.

Fairbanks and Edna Whitson were married in October 1920 and divorced in 1930. They had one son, William Fairbanks (December 12, 1923 – April 20, 1999), who served in the Navy during World War II.

Other movies of Fairbanks include the western The Clean-Up (1922); the western Down by the Rio Grande co-starring Dorothy Revier, the drama A Fight for Honor co-starring Eva Novak, in which Fairbanks played the role as Jack Adams, the drama Racing for Life co-starring Eva Novak, in which Fairbanks played the role as Jack Grant, and Border Women co-starring Dorothy Revier, in which Fairbanks played Big Boy Merritt, (all released in 1924); the serial Vanishing Millions co-starring Vivian Rich, in which Fairbanks played Dave Merrill, and the action Flying High co-starring Alice Calhoun, in which Fairbanks played Roy Cummins, (both released in 1926); the drama One Chance in a Million co-starring Viora Daniel, in which Fairbanks played Jerry Blaine, and the action/adventure The Down Grade co-starring Alice Calhoun, in which Fairbanks played Ted Lansing, (both released in 1927); and Wyoming (1928) with Tim McCoy and Dorothy Sebastian, and directed by W.S. Van Dyke, in which Fairbanks played Buffalo Bill Cody.

Although Fairbanks was a busy movie star through the greater part of the 1920s, after playing Long Collins in The Vanishing West (1928), he retired from the screen.

William Fairbanks died at age 50 of lobar pneumonia in Los Angeles. A military funeral service was conducted at graveside in Los Angeles National Cemetery in Sawtelle.

== Selected filmography ==
- Somewhere in France (1916)
- The Little Brother (1917)
- Wolf Lowry (1917)
- The Mother Instinct (1917)
- The Medicine Man (1917)
- The Flame of the Yukon (1917)
- The Hired Man (1918)
- What Women Love (1920)
- Peaceful Peters (1922)
- A Western Demon (1922)

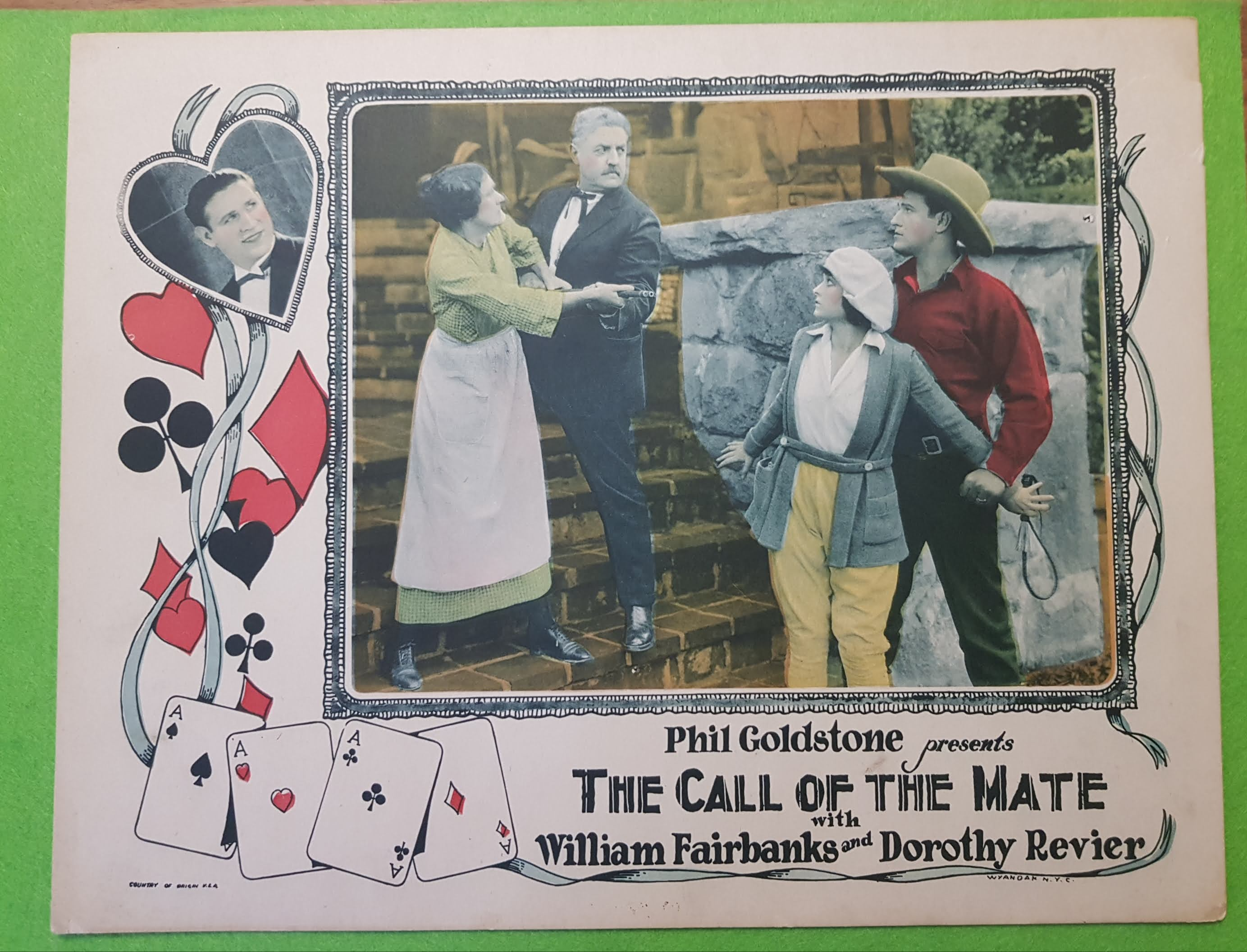
William Fairbanks - The Call Of The Mate - 1923

- Spawn of the Desert (1923)
- The Law Rustlers (1923)
- Her Man (1924)
- The Beautiful Sinner (1924)
- The Cowboy and the Flapper (1924)
- Marry in Haste (1924)
- The Battling Fool (1924)
- Racing for Life (1924)
- The Fatal Mistake (1924)
- A Fight for Honor (1924)
- Tainted Money (1924)
- Women First (1924)
- The Other Kind of Love (1924)
- The Torrent (1924)
- Do It Now (1924)
- The Great Sensation (1925)
- The New Champion (1925)
- Fighting Youth (1925)
- The Fearless Lover (1925)
- The Handsome Brute (1925)
- A Fight to the Finish (1925)
- Speed Mad (1925)
- The Winning Wallop (1926)
- The Mile-a-Minute Man (1926)
- Flying High (1926)
- The Down Grade (1927)
- Through Thick and Thin (1927)
- Catch-As-Catch-Can (1927)
- Spoilers of the West (1927)
- One Chance in a Million (1927)
- When Danger Calls (1927)
- Wyoming (1928)
- Under the Black Eagle (1928)
- The Vanishing West (1928)
