= The Battling Fool =

- Lobby card
- Directed by: W. S. Van Dyke
- Written by: Heath Cobb; Wilfred Lucas
- Production company: Columbia Pictures
- Distributed by: Perfection Pictures
- Release date: August 1, 1924
- Running time: 5 reels
- Country: United States
- Language: Silent (English intertitles)

The Battling Fool is a 1924 American silent melodrama film directed by W. S. Van Dyke. It was produced and distributed by Columbia Pictures. The film survives in the Library of Congress film archive as well as in private film collections.

== Plot ==
A local poolroom proprietor teaches the son to box whence the father ousts. the youth from the homestead and he goes to the city Meanwhile the daughter has become crippled through being trampled upon in the aftermath of the three-round stay in the town hall, for which her father will do nothing, as he believes it a form of retribution for her having attended the affair disguised as a boy Six hours before the battle for the belt the boy hears of the girl’s condition, hops into a machine and tears to the village and brings her back where she can obtain medical attention. Placed within his apartment, phone receiver at her ear during the fight, her welfare becomes further impaired through fire breaking out from which she must needs be rescued by the new champ, still in his ring togs and a bathrobe. He succeeds.

== Cast ==
- William Fairbanks as Mark Jenkins
- Eva Novak as Helen Chadwick
- Fred J. Butler as Hiram Chadwick
- Laura Winston as Mrs. Chadwick
- Mark Fenton as Rev. Josiah Jenkins
- Catherine Craig as Madeleine Le Bertin
- Jack Byron as Clarence Lorraine
- Pat Harmon as Jerry Sullivan
- Andy Waldron as Reuben
- Edgar Kennedy as Dan O'Leary

== Reception ==
A contemporary review in Variety wrote that although the story was unoriginal, William Farbanks' performance made up for it.

A review in the San Pedro News-Pilot praised the rescue scenes.
