= A Fight to the Finish =

A Fight to the Finish may refer to:

- A Fight to the Finish (1925 film)
- A Fight to the Finish, a 1947 Terrytoons short with Mighty Mouse
- A Fight to the Finish (1937 film)
