= Winning the Futurity =

1926 film

- Directed by: Scott R. Dunlap
- Written by: Finis Fox; Hunt Stromberg
- Produced by: I.E. Chadwick
- Starring: Cullen Landis; Clara Horton; Ernest Hilliard
- Production company: Chadwick Pictures
- Distributed by: Chadwick Pictures; Woolf and Freedman (UK)
- Release date: April 15, 1926
- Running time: 60 minutes
- Country: United States
- Languages: Silent; English intertitles

Winning the Futurity is a 1926 American silent drama film directed by Scott R. Dunlap and starring Cullen Landis, Clara Horton and Ernest Hilliard.

== Cast ==
- Cullen Landis as Luke Allen
- Clara Horton as Nelle Barkley
- Ernest Hilliard as Chet Kildare
- Bruce Covington as Colonel Barkley
- Pat Harmon as Brett Marshall
- Otis Harlan as Tom Giles
- George Reed as Uncle Mose
- Eugenie Besserer as Mary Allen

== Bibliography ==
- Munden, Kenneth White. The American Film Institute Catalog of Motion Pictures Produced in the United States, Part 1. University of California Press, 1997.
