= Wyoming (1928 film) =

1928 film

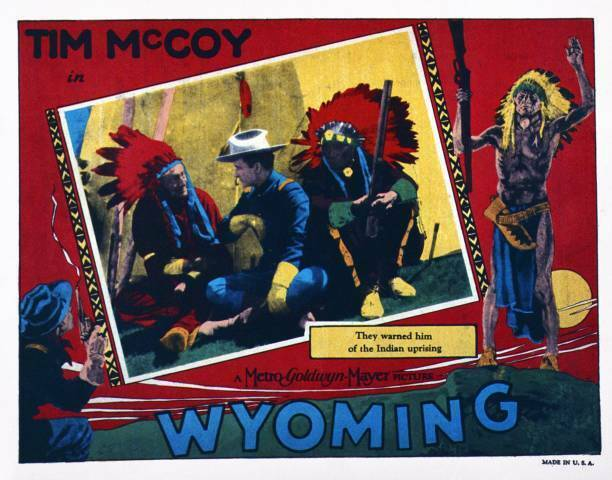
- Directed by: W. S. Van Dyke
- Screenplay by: Ruth Cummings; Madeleine Ruthven; Ross B. Wills
- Story by: W. S. Van Dyke
- Starring: Tim McCoy; Dorothy Sebastian; Charles Bell; William Fairbanks; Chief John Big Tree
- Cinematography: Clyde De Vinna
- Edited by: William LeVanway
- Production company: Metro-Goldwyn-Mayer
- Distributed by: Metro-Goldwyn-Mayer
- Release date: March 24, 1928
- Running time: 50 minutes
- Country: United States
- Languages: Silent; English intertitles

Wyoming is a 1928 American silent Western film directed by W. S. Van Dyke and written by Ruth Cummings, Madeleine Ruthven and Ross B. Wills. The film stars Tim McCoy, Dorothy Sebastian, Charles Bell, William Fairbanks and Chief John Big Tree. The film was released on March 24, 1928, by Metro-Goldwyn-Mayer.

== Plot summary ==
Two boys, one white and the other Native American, are raised together but become enemies in adulthood.

== Cast ==
- Tim McCoy as Lt. Jack Colton
- Dorothy Sebastian as Samantha Jerusha Farrell
- Charles Bell as Chief Big Cloud
- William Fairbanks as Buffalo Bill
- Chief John Big Tree as An Indian
- Goes in the Lodge as Chief Chapulti
- Blue Washington as Mose
- Bert Henderson as Oswald
