= Code of the West (1925 film) =

1925 film

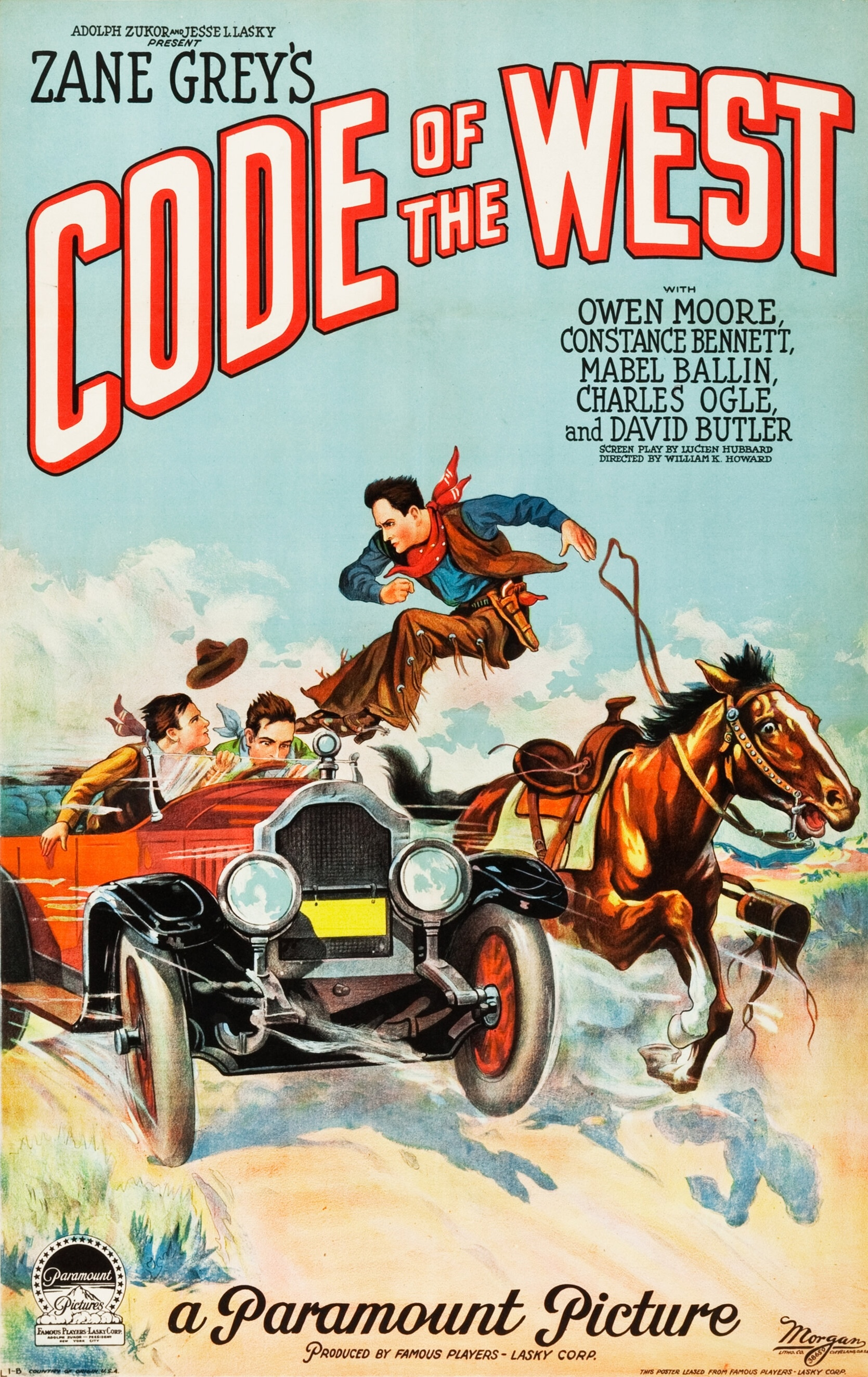
- Theatrical release poster
- Directed by: William K. Howard
- Written by: Zane Grey; Lucien Hubbard
- Produced by: Jesse L. Lasky; Adolph Zukor
- Starring: Owen Moore; Constance Bennett; Mabel Ballin; Charles Stanton Ogle; David Butler; George Bancroft; Gertrude Short
- Cinematography: Lucien N. Andriot
- Production company: Famous Players–Lasky Corporation
- Distributed by: Paramount Pictures
- Release date: April 6, 1925
- Running time: 70 minutes
- Country: United States
- Languages: Silent; English intertitles

Code of the West is a 1925 American silent Western film directed by William K. Howard and written by Zane Grey and Lucien Hubbard. The film stars Owen Moore, Constance Bennett, Mabel Ballin, Charles Stanton Ogle, David Butler, George Bancroft and Gertrude Short. The film was released on April 6, 1925, by Paramount Pictures.

== Plot ==
As described in a film magazine review, Cal Thurman, a timid fellow, thinking that the woman he is to meet at the train station is an old maid, avoids her when he finds that she is a pretty young woman who flirts with the cowboys. He finally uses rough methods to win her love and, after through flames in a forest fire, succeeds in winning her.

== Cast ==
- Owen Moore as Cal Thurman
- Constance Bennett as Georgie May, a free-spirited Flapper
- Mabel Ballin as Mary Stockwell
- Charles Stanton Ogle as Henry Thurman
- David Butler as Bid Hatfield
- George Bancroft as Enoch Thurman
- Gertrude Short as Mollie Thurman
- Lillian Leighton as Ma Thurman
- Eddie Gribbon as Tuck Merry
- Pat Hartigan as Cal Bloom
- Frankie Lee as Bud
- Mark Hamilton as Panhandle Arizonie

== Preservation ==
With no prints of Code of the West located in any film archives, it is a lost film.

== See also ==
- The Cowboy and the Flapper, a similar 1924 silent Western film featuring a flapper character
