= Jefferson Moffitt =

American screenwriter

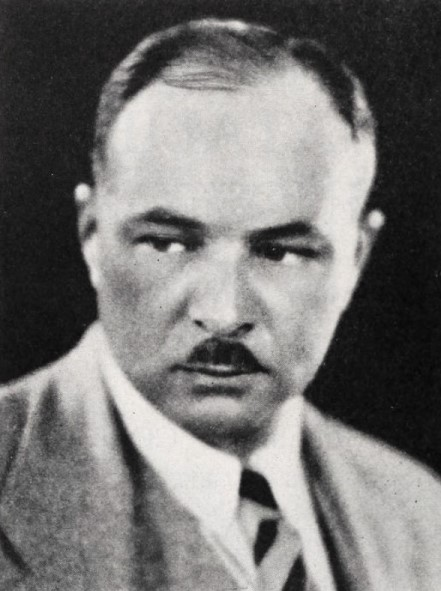
- From a 1925 magazine
- Born: December 17, 1887; Oakland, California, USA
- Died: April 8, 1954 (aged 66); Los Angeles, California, USA
- Years active: 1923-1953

Jefferson Moffitt (December 17, 1887 – April 8, 1954) was an American screenwriter and film director. He wrote for more than 80 films between 1923 and 1953. He was born in Oakland, California, and died in Los Angeles, California.

== Partial filmography ==
- The Oregon Trail (1923)
- The Eagle's Talons (1923)
- In the Days of Daniel Boone (1923)
- The Other Kind of Love (1924)
- The Cowboy and the Flapper (1924)
- The Martyr Sex (1924)
- Battling Bunyan (1924)
- Butter Fingers (1925)
- Mulhall's Greatest Catch (1926)
- Legionnaires in Paris (1927)
- Crazy to Act (1927)
- The Good-Bye Kiss (1928)
- The Campus Vamp (1928)
- Bonnie Scotland (1935)
- Kelly the Second (1936)
- Always in Trouble (1938)
