= Tainted Money =

- Directed by: Henry MacRae
- Written by: Stuart Paton
- Starring: William Fairbanks; Eva Novak; Bruce Gordon
- Cinematography: Allen Q. Thompson
- Production company: Perfection Pictures
- Distributed by: Columbia Pictures
- Release date: December 15, 1924
- Running time: 50 minutes
- Country: United States
- Languages: Silent; English intertitles

Tainted Money is a 1924 American silent drama film directed by Henry MacRae and starring William Fairbanks, Eva Novak and Bruce Gordon.

== Cast ==
- William Fairbanks as Chester Carlton
- Eva Novak as Adams' Daughter
- Bruce Gordon as Marston
- Edwards Davis as John Carlton
- Carl Stockdale
- Paul Weigel
- Frank Clark

== Preservation and status ==
A complete copy of the film is held at the Archives Du Film Du CNC.

== Bibliography ==
- Robert B. Connelly. The Silents: Silent Feature Films, 1910-36, Volume 40, Issue 2. December Press, 1998.
