= Flying High (1926 film) =

American silent action film

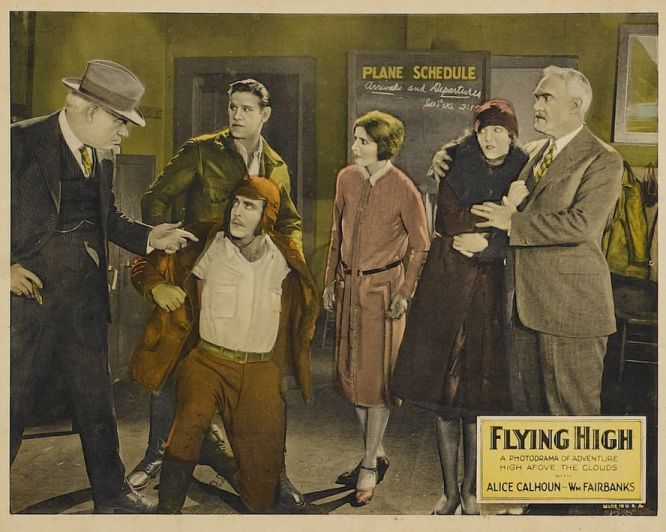
- Directed by: Charles Hutchison
- Written by: L. V. Jefferson
- Produced by: Samuel Sax; Samuel Bischoff
- Starring: William Fairbanks; Alice Calhoun; Frank Rice
- Cinematography: James S. Brown Jr.
- Edited by: Edward Curtiss
- Production company: Camera Pictures
- Distributed by: Lumas Film Corporation
- Release date: December 20, 1926
- Running time: 60 minutes (4,665ft)
- Country: United States
- Languages: Silent; English intertitles

Flying High is a 1926 American silent action film directed by Charles Hutchison and starring William Fairbanks, Alice Calhoun and Frank Rice. The film is based on a magazine story by William Henry Cook, entitled "The Watchman in the Sky."

Flying High was the fourth of eight William Fairbanks productions released through Lumas Film Corporation. Shooting began in December 1926.

== Plot ==
This plot description appeared in Motion Picture News. A broke, ex-army aviator is offered money to deliver a stolen package by airplane. He learns of theft and is hired to run-down the thieves by the president of the Aero Company, who has a daughter with whom the aviator is in love. The aviator outwits the thieves and succeeds in arresting them, while also getting the girl.

A contemporary Variety review notes that the plot features "a society woman who is a spy for the air thieves" and "her husband, who runs an aerial express company to mask his operations as the bandits' master mind." The review also reveals that there is a "capital thrill incident, with the hero making a parachute descent into the bandit's hiding place from his own plane," and capturing the bandits.

== Cast ==
- William Fairbanks as Roy Cummins
- Alice Calhoun as Patricia Barton
- Frank Rice as Haines - the Mechanic
- LeRoy Mason as Lester Swope
- Jimmy Anderson as Carson
- Cecile Cameron as Vera Owens
- Joseph W. Girard as Col. Rockliffe Owens
- James Gordon as V.E. Martin

== Reception ==
Variety described the film as a "'stunt' melodrama with a wealth of highly flavored action." The review praised the airplane stunt work, but found the interpersonal drama to be "futile and juvenile." The review called the plot "cumbersome," and the climax, "a bit too elaborate."
