= Dorothy Howell (screenwriter) =

American screenwriter

- Born: May 10, 1899; Chicago, Illinois, USA
- Died: June 8, 1971 (aged 72); Los Angeles, California, USA
- Occupation: Screenwriter
- Spouse: Mendel B. Silverberg

Dorothy Howell (May 10, 1899 – June 8, 1971), was an American screenwriter active mostly during the 1920s and 1930s.

== Biography ==
Born to Elmer Howell and Carrie Lorenz, Dorothy was raised in Illinois alongside her younger brother Raymond. Raymond would go on to work at Hollywood studios as a technician, according to census records.

Howell worked as a scenarist and screenwriter for Columbia for much of her career. She started out at Columbia as Harry Cohn's secretary and was appointed assistant general production manager at the company in 1926. Before joining Columbia, she had also worked as a secretary to executives Irving Thalberg and B.P. Schulberg.

She was married to Mendel B. Silverberg, a prominent entertainment lawyer (who had previously been married to Alice Calhoun).

== Selected filmography ==
- Unmarried Wives (1924)
- The New Champion (1925)
- Fighting Youth (1925)
- Speed Mad (1925)
- A Fight to the Finish (1925)
- The Better Way (1926)
- The Price of Honor (1927)
- Birds of Prey (1927)
- Rich Men's Sons (1927)
- The Romantic Age (1927)
- The Kid Sister (1927)
- Alias the Lone Wolf (1927)
- Playing Straight (1927)
- Stage Kisses (1927)
- The Reckoning (1928)
- Virgin Lips (1928)
- Runaway Girls (1928)
- Submarine (1928)
- The Street of Illusion (1929)
- The Donovan Affair (1929)
- The Squealer (1930)
- The Last of the Lone Wolf (1930)
- For the Love o' Lil (1930)
- Men Without Law (1930)
- The Last Parade (1931)
- Lover Come Back (1931)
- Fifty Fathoms Deep (1931)
- Men in Her Life (1931)
- The Final Edition (1932)
- Whirlpool (1934)
- I'll Fix It (1934) (story)
- Quest for the Lost City (1955)
