= The Fearless Lover =

- Directed by: Scott R. Dunlap; Henry MacRae
- Written by: Scott R. Dunlap
- Starring: William Fairbanks; Eva Novak; Tom Kennedy
- Cinematography: Allen Q. Thompson
- Production company: Perfection Pictures
- Distributed by: Columbia Pictures; Wardour Films (UK)
- Release date: February 1, 1925
- Running time: 53 minutes
- Country: United States
- Language: Silent (English intertitles)

The Fearless Lover is a lost 1925 American silent drama film directed by Scott R. Dunlap and Henry MacRae and starring William Fairbanks, Eva Novak, and Tom Kennedy.

== Plot ==
As described in a film magazine reviews, Patrick Michael Casey, son of Sergeant Casey, whose record is the finest, joins the police force and is assigned to duty in the toughest section of the city with orders to make the crooks and gangsters hate the neighborhood. Tom Dugan, gang leader, annoys Enid Sexton, telephone operator, and Casey stops him, telling him what will happen if he does not become a straight citizen. During telephone strike a boy is struck by an automobile and dies because the wires are dead and a doctor cannot be called. Casey falls in love with Enid. Enid's brother Ted joins Dugan's gang when a silk robbery is being planned and is arrested. Casey gets his sergeant's promise to let Ted off if Casey cleans up Dugan's gang. Casey, alone, crashes into the gang's hangout and goes to work with club and gun. He chases Dugan to the roof. The crook empties his gun at Casey. Casey then lays aside his gun and club, mauls Dugan into submission with his fists, and takes him to the station. Then he and Enid make plans to go to the church for a wedding.

== Cast ==
- William Fairbanks as Patrick Michael Casey
- Eva Novak as Enid Sexton
- Tom Kennedy as Tom Dugan
- Lydia Knott as Mrs. James Sexton
- Arthur Rankin as Ted Sexton
- Frankie Darro as Frankie

== Bibliography ==
- Langman, Larry. American Film Cycles: The Silent Era. Greenwood Publishing, 1998.
