= The Broadway Madonna =

1922 film

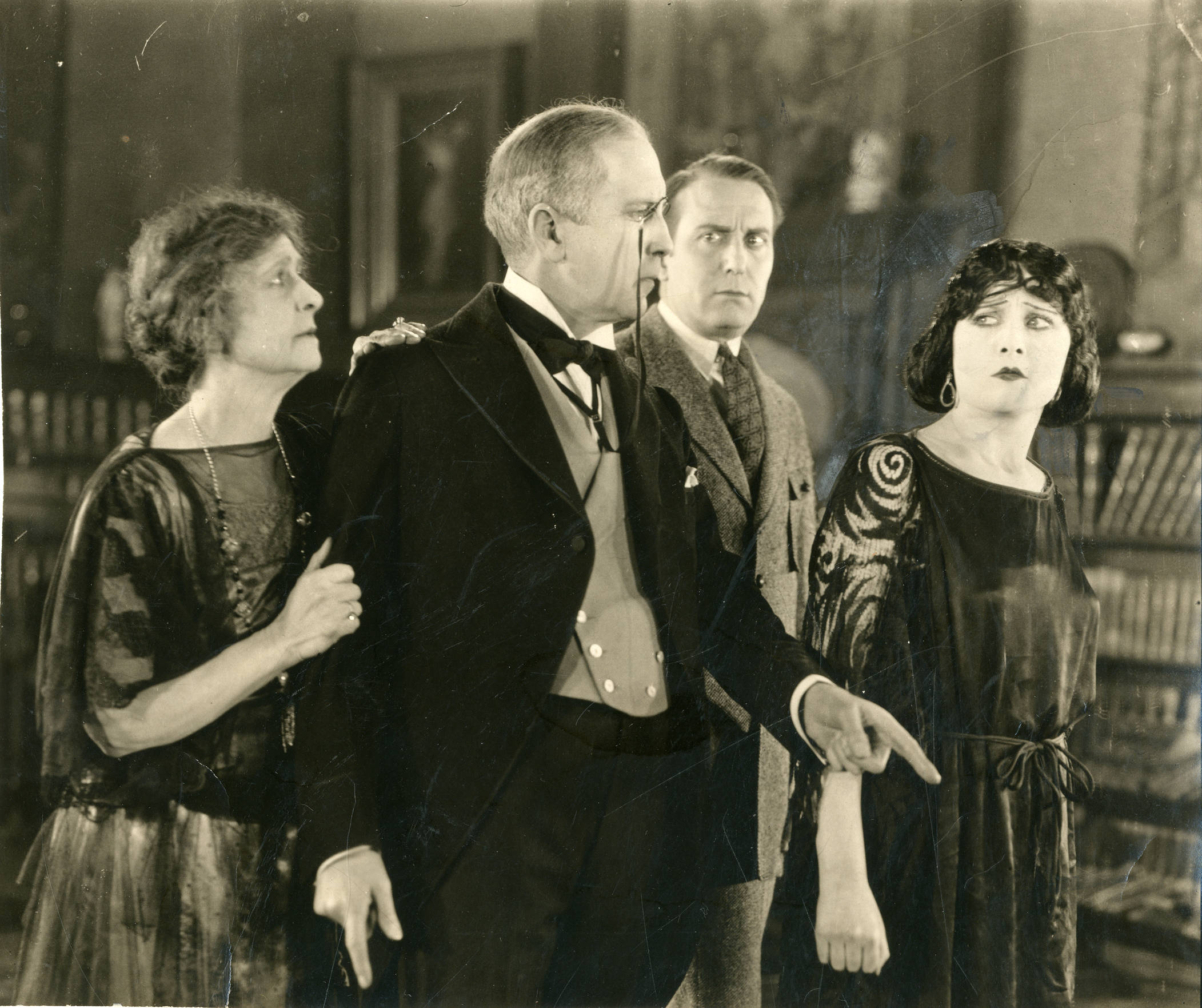
- Directed by: Harry Revier
- Starring: Dorothy Revier; Jack Connolly; Harry von Meter
- Production company: Quality Film Productions
- Distributed by: Film Booking Offices of America; Wardour Films (UK)
- Release date: October 29, 1922
- Running time: 60 minutes
- Country: United States
- Languages: Silent; English intertitles

The Broadway Madonna is a 1922 American silent drama film directed by Harry Revier and starring Dorothy Revier, Jack Connolly and Harry von Meter. It marked the screen debut of Dorothy Revier. Location shooting took place around San Francisco where the film is partly set. It was given a 1924 British release, where it was distributed by Wardour Films.

== Cast ==
- Dorothy Revier as Vivian Collins
- Jack Connolly as Tom Bradshaw
- Harry von Meter as Dr. Kramer
- Eugene Burr as Slinky Davis
- Juanita Hansen as Gloria Thomas
- Lee Willard as Judge Bradshaw
- Lydia Knott

== Bibliography ==
- Munden, Kenneth White. The American Film Institute Catalog of Motion Pictures Produced in the United States, Part 1. University of California Press, 1997.
