= Women First =

1924 film

- Directed by: B. Reeves Eason
- Written by: Wilfred Lucas
- Starring: William Fairbanks; Eva Novak; Lydia Knott
- Cinematography: Allen Q. Thompson
- Production company: Columbia Pictures
- Distributed by: Columbia Pictures
- Release date: November 1, 1924
- Running time: 51 minutes
- Country: United States
- Languages: Silent; English intertitles

Women First is a lost 1924 American silent drama film directed by B. Reeves Eason and starring William Fairbanks, Eva Novak and Lydia Knott.

== Cast ==
- William Fairbanks as Billy
- Eva Novak as Jennie
- Lydia Knott as Mrs. Abigail Doon
- Bob Rhodes as Johnny Doon
- Lloyd Whitlock as Harvey Boyd
- Andrew Waldron as Judge Weatherfax
- Dan Crimmins as Amos Snivens
- William J. Dyer as Sheriff
- Max Asher as H.L.S.J. Lee
- Merta Sterling as Mandy Lee
- Jack Richardson as Madden
- William A. Carroll as Stableman

== Bibliography ==
- Bernard F. Dick. Columbia Pictures: Portrait of a Studio. University Press of Kentucky, 2015.
