= A Fight for Honor =

- Directed by: Henry MacRae
- Written by: H.W. George
- Produced by: Harry Cohn
- Starring: William Fairbanks; Eva Novak; Claire McDowell
- Production company: Perfection Pictures
- Distributed by: Columbia Pictures
- Release date: August 1, 1924
- Running time: 50 minutes
- Country: United States
- Languages: Silent; English intertitles

A Fight for Honor is a lost 1924 American silent action film directed by Henry MacRae and starring William Fairbanks, Eva Novak and Claire McDowell.

== Cast ==
- William Fairbanks as Jack Adams
- Eva Novak as Margaret Hill
- Claire McDowell as Mrs. Hill
- Jack Byron as Walter Bradson
- Marion Harlan as Mary Hill
- Derry Welford as Gertie Gilson
- Wilfred Lucas as Tom Grady

== Bibliography ==
- Robert B. Connelly. The Silents: Silent Feature Films, 1910-36, Volume 40, Issue 2. December Press, 1998.
