= The Other Kind of Love =

1924 film directed by Duke Worne

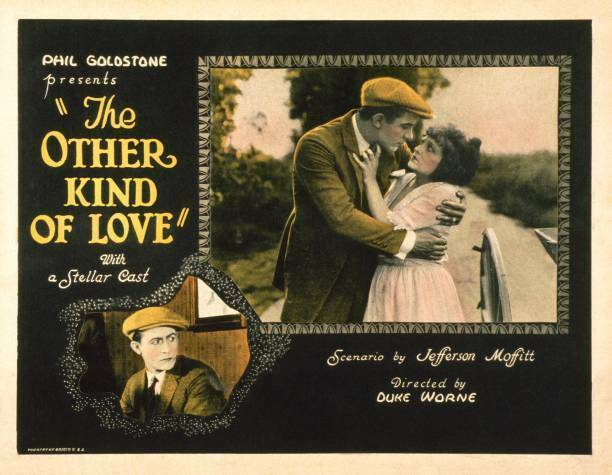
- Directed by: Duke Worne
- Written by: Jefferson Moffitt; Buckleigh Fritz Oxford
- Produced by: Phil Goldstone
- Starring: William Fairbanks; Dorothy Revier; Edith Yorke
- Cinematography: Roland Price
- Production company: Phil Goldstone Productions
- Release date: June 28, 1924
- Running time: 50 minutes
- Country: United States
- Languages: Silent; English intertitles

The Other Kind of Love is a 1924 American silent drama film directed by Duke Worne and starring William Fairbanks, Dorothy Revier and Edith Yorke.

== Cast ==
- William Fairbanks as Adam Benton
- Dorothy Revier as Elsie
- Edith Yorke as Mary Benton
- Robert Keith as George Benton
- Rhea Mitchell as The Chorus Girl

== Bibliography ==
- Darby, William. Masters of Lens and Light: A Checklist of Major Cinematographers and Their Feature Films. Scarecrow Press, 1991
