= The Fatal Mistake =

1924 film

- Directed by: Scott R. Dunlap
- Written by: Wilfred Lucas
- Produced by: Harry Cohn
- Starring: William Fairbanks; Eva Novak; Dot Farley
- Cinematography: Allen Q. Thompson
- Production company: Columbia Pictures
- Distributed by: Columbia Pictures
- Release date: September 1, 1924
- Running time: 50 minutes
- Country: United States
- Languages: Silent; English intertitles

The Fatal Mistake is a 1924 American silent crime film directed by Scott R. Dunlap and starring William Fairbanks, Eva Novak and Wilfred Lucas.

== Synopsis ==
A sacked newspaper reporter and a policewoman join forces to battle a gang of criminals.

== Cast ==
- William Fairbanks as Jack Darwin
- Eva Novak as Ethel Bennett
- Wilfred Lucas
- Dot Farley
- Bruce Gordon
- Harry McCoy
- Paul Weigel
- Frank Clark

== Preservation and status ==
An incomplete copy is held at the Library of Congress.

== Bibliography ==
- Bernard F. Dick. Columbia Pictures: Portrait of a Studio. University Press of Kentucky, 2015.
