= The Good-Bye Kiss =

1928 film

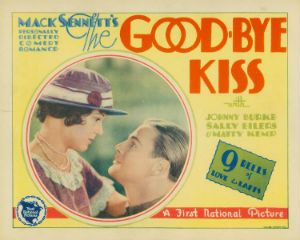
- Theatrical release poster
- Directed by: Mack Sennett
- Screenplay by: Jefferson Moffitt; Mack Sennett; Carl Harbaugh
- Story by: Jefferson Moffitt; Phil Whitman; Carl Harbaugh
- Produced by: Mack Sennett
- Starring: Johnny Burke; Sally Eilers; Matty Kemp; Wheeler Oakman; Irving Bacon; Lionel Belmore
- Cinematography: John W. Boyle
- Edited by: William Hornbeck
- Production company: Mack Sennett Productions
- Distributed by: First National Pictures
- Release date: July 8, 1928
- Running time: 90 minutes
- Country: United States
- Language: Sound (Synchronized) English intertitles

The Good-Bye Kiss is a 1928 American synchronized sound comedy film directed by Mack Sennett and written by Jefferson Moffitt, Mack Sennett, and Carl Harbaugh. While the film has no audible dialog, it was released with a synchronized musical score with sound effects using the sound-on-disc Vitaphone process. The film stars Johnny Burke, Sally Eilers, Matty Kemp, Wheeler Oakman, Irving Bacon, and Lionel Belmore. The film was released on July 8, 1928, by First National Pictures.

== Plot ==
Sally is charmed when her boyfriend Bill Williams appears in a soldier’s uniform. Playfully, she poses with him on a military motorcycle sidecar for a photograph. When mischievous soldiers ignite flash powder as Johnny and his sweetheart Toots arrive in a buggy, the startled horse bolts. Bill races after them on the motorcycle—with Sally still in the sidecar—and heroically stops the runaway by the railroad tracks just as a train rushes by. Sally, now deeply impressed, accompanies Bill to the ship where he and the other troops are departing for France. There, they share a heartfelt goodbye and he slips a ring on her finger.

Determined to be near him, Sally hides in the general’s car, which is hoisted aboard the transport ship. When discovered, she’s taken in by a kindly Salvation Army matron and becomes part of their war effort. Bill is thrilled to find her onboard.

Later, in the trenches, Bill is paralyzed by fear when ordered to go “over the top.” Johnny berates him, and Sally, overhearing, reassures Bill that his fear is only in his mind—and that he can overcome it.

During leave in a French café, Bill, ashamed and discouraged, drinks heavily and is thrown out. At the same time, Johnny recognizes a man speaking with Sergeant Hoffman as a German officer he once encountered. Johnny cries “Spy!”—and at that moment, enemy planes begin an air raid, plunging the city into darkness.

Sally finds Bill in the street and forces him to confront the terror of falling bombs. Her courage—and his own anger at the carnage inflicted on innocent civilians—strengthen his resolve. When Bill sees the spy and Sergeant Hoffman leaving, he hides under the tarp of their vehicle, which is bound for the German lines.

Overhearing their plan to blow up the Allied trenches once the American troops have advanced, Bill springs into action. After the vehicle is abandoned under fire, he follows the enemy into their sap tunnel and throws a grenade, killing the Germans except for Hoffman. In a brutal hand-to-hand fight, Bill fatally stabs the sergeant moments before he can detonate the mines.

When the American troops arrive, they find Bill battered but alive. Among them is Sally—disguised in helmet and coat—who had taken Bill’s place on the front line when he failed to report, hoping to protect him from punishment. The captain commends Bill for his valor. Sally runs into his arms, proud and relieved, as Bill has finally proven himself a true hero.

== Cast ==
- Johnny Burke as Johnny
- Sally Eilers as Sally
- Matty Kemp as Bill Williams
- Wheeler Oakman as Sergeant Hoffman
- Irving Bacon as Colonel Von Stein
- Lionel Belmore as The General
- Alma Bennett as Toots
- Carmelita Geraghty as Mademoiselle Nannette
- Eugene Pallette as The Captain
- Jean Laverty as Mademoiselle Jeanne
- Andy Clyde as The Grandfather

== Music ==
The film featured a theme song entitled "Your Good-Bye Kiss" which was composed by Byron Gay and Neil Moret. Also featured on the soundtrack was a song entitled "Just Another Night" which was composed by Walter Donaldson.

== See also ==
- List of early sound feature films (1926–1929)
