= Lydia Knott =

American actress (1866–1955)

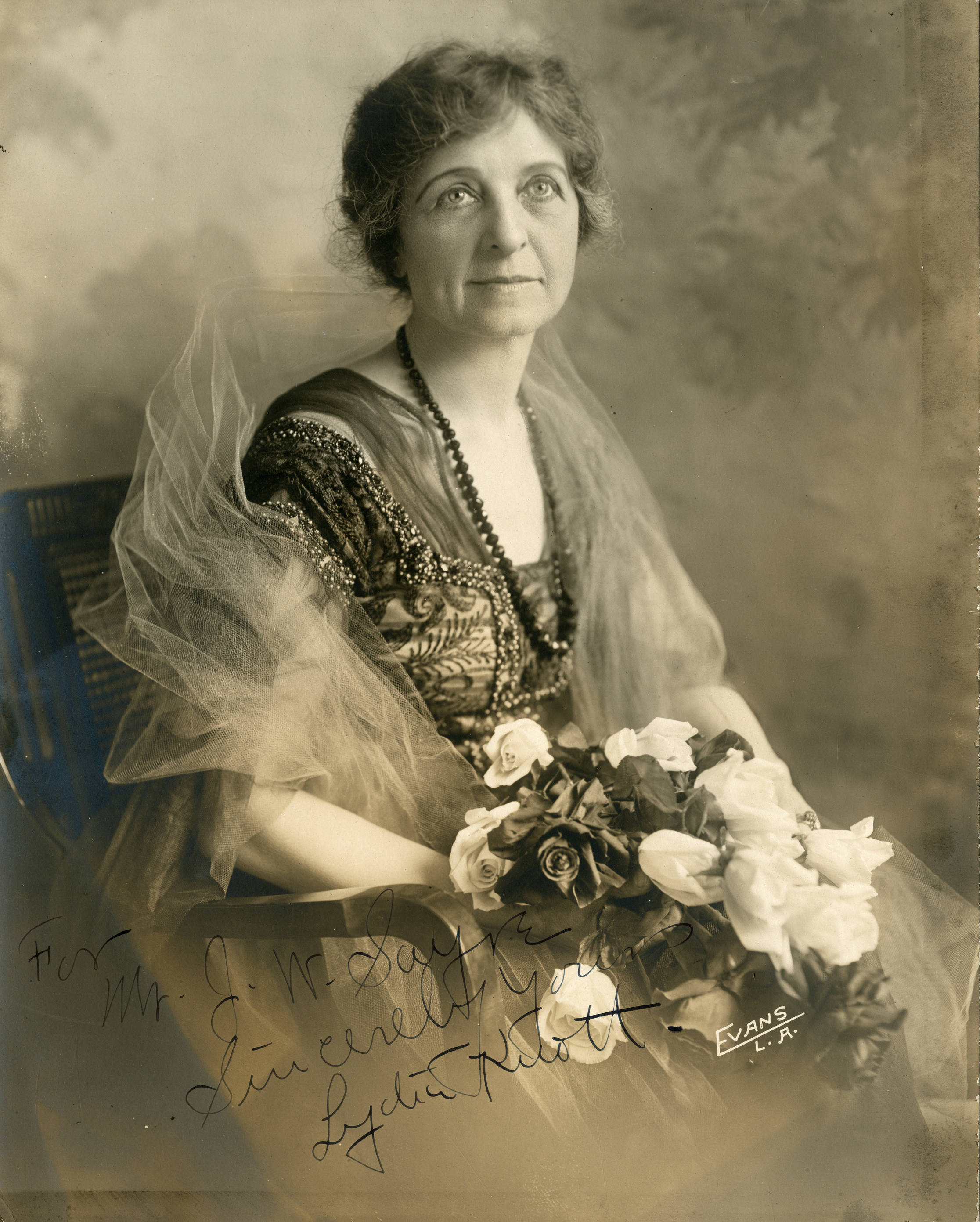
- Knott in 1922
- Born: October 1, 1866; Tyner, Indiana
- Died: March 30, 1955 (aged 88); Woodland Hills, Los Angeles
- Occupation: Actress
- Years active: 1914–1937
- Relatives: Lambert Hillyer (son)

Lydia Knott (October 1, 1866 – March 30, 1955) was an American actress of the silent film era. She appeared in more than 90 films between 1914 and 1937.

== Biography ==
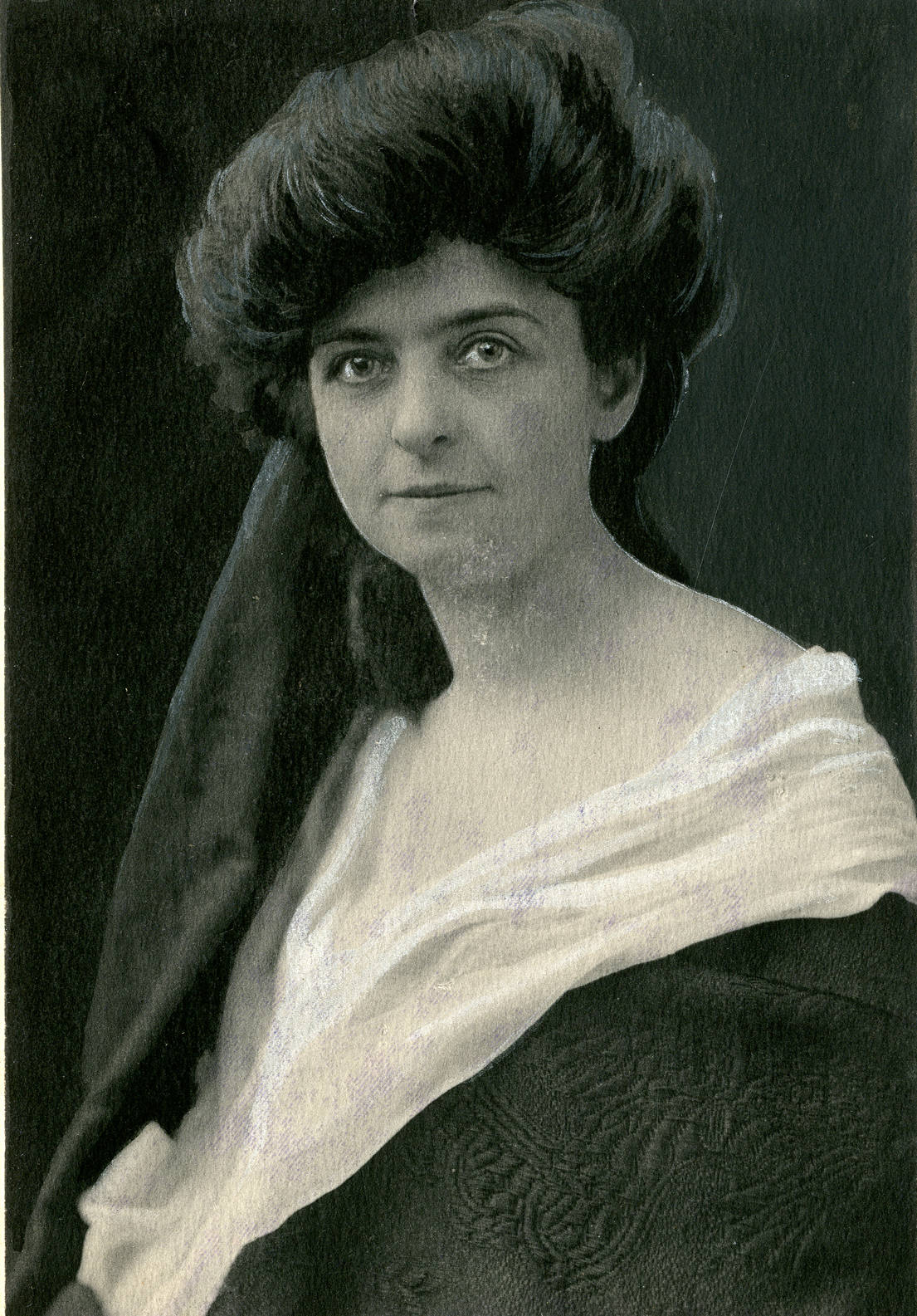
Lydia Knott in 1902.

Knott was born in Tyner, Indiana, the daughter of Lambert and Clarissa Knott. She died in Woodland Hills, Los Angeles. She was the mother of director Lambert Hillyer.

For years, Knott was David Higgins' leading lady. She acted in stock theater in Albany, Chicago, Cincinnati, and Toledo, among other cities. She toured the United States in at least five productions. She also acted in vaudeville.

== Partial filmography ==
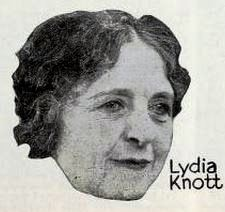
Detail of ad for The Flirt, 1922

- Paying the Price (1916)
- The Common Law (1916)
- The Clodhopper (1917)
- His Mother's Boy (1917)
- Sudden Jim (1917)
- The Dark Road (1917)
- Crime and Punishment (1917)
- The Hired Man (1918)
- Keys of the Righteous (1918)
- The Marriage Ring (1918)
- Danger, Go Slow (1918)
- In Judgement Of (1918)
- The Little Diplomat (1919)
- The Heart of Youth (1919)
- In Wrong (1919)
- The Love Hunger (1919)
- Luck in Pawn (1919)
- What Every Woman Learns (1919)
- The Pointing Finger (1919)
- The Dwelling Place of Light (1920)
- Blackmail (1920)
- Homespun Folks (1920)
- The Infamous Miss Revell (1921)
- The Breaking Point (1921)
- The Lure of Youth (1921)
- Scrap Iron (1921)
- A Certain Rich Man (1921)
- Beating the Game (1921)
- Playing with Fire (1921)
- Across the Dead-Line (1922)
- The Broadway Madonna (1922)
- Turn To The Right (1922)
- Dusk to Dawn (1922)
- The Super-Sex (1922)
- Afraid to Fight (1922)
- The Dangerous Little Demon (1922)
- The Flirt (1922)
- A Woman of Paris (1923)
- Dollar Devils (1923)
- Garrison's Finish (1923)
- The Man Life Passed By (1923)
- St. Elmo (1923)
- Held to Answer (1923)
- Those Who Dance (1924)
- The Perfect Flapper (1924)
- Racing for Life (1924)
- Women First (1924)
- Gerald Cranston's Lady (1924)
- Chalk Marks (1924)
- Barbara Frietchie (1924)
- Dynamite Smith (1924)
- The Primrose Path (1925)
- Rose of the World (1925)
- High and Handsome (1925)
- The Fearless Lover (1925)
- East Lynne (1925)
- Going Crooked (1926)
- Kentucky Handicap (1926)
- Pretty Clothes (1927)
- Life of an Actress (1927)
- The House of Scandal (1928)
- Overland Bound (1929)
- Guilty? (1930)
- Men Without Law (1930)
- If I Had a Million (1932)
- Get That Girl (1932)
- The Final Edition (1932)
- The Defense Rests (1934)
- Rocky Rhodes (1934)
- Eight Bells (1935)
- Fair Warning (1937)
