= The Hired Man (film) =

- Directed by: Victor Schertzinger
- Screenplay by: Victor Schertzinger
- Produced by: Thomas H. Ince
- Starring: Charles Ray; Charles K. French; Robert Gordon; Doris May; Lydia Knott; William Fairbanks
- Cinematography: Chester A. Lyons
- Production company: Thomas H. Ince Productions
- Distributed by: Paramount Pictures
- Release date: January 27, 1918
- Running time: 50 minutes
- Country: United States
- Language: Silent (English intertitles)

The Hired Man is a 1918 American silent comedy film written and directed by Victor Schertzinger. The film stars Charles Ray, Charles K. French, Robert Gordon, Doris May, Lydia Knott, and William Fairbanks. The film was released on January 27, 1918, by Paramount Pictures.

== Plot ==
As described in a film magazine, Ezry, the farm's hired man, in love with his employer's daughter Ruth, is anxious to obtain an education. When Ruth learns of his ambitions, she assists him in his studies. With enough money saved to go to college, on the way to the railroad depot he stops to say farewell to Ruth's brother Walter, and there learns that it will take just that amount of money to keep Walter out of prison for stealing money from the bank where he works. Ezry returns to the farm. That night there is a dance, and after everyone has left, Ruth goes to Ezry to teach him how to dance. They are seen by a jealous suitor of Ruth's who tells her father Caleb, which results in the discharge of Ezry. Leaving that night, Ezry looks back at the farm and sees that the house is on fire. He rushes back and rescues Walter amid falling timbers. The brother tells everyone why Ezry did not go to college, and Ezry is welcomed back at the farm as a member of the family.

== Cast ==
- Charles Ray as Ezry Hollins
- Charles K. French as Caleb Endicott (credited as Charles French)
- Robert Gordon as Walter Endicott (credited as Gilbert Gordon)
- Doris May as Ruth Endicott
- Lydia Knott as Mrs. Endicott
- William Fairbanks as Stuart Morley (credited as Carl Ullman)
