= The Handsome Brute =

1925 film

- Directed by: Robert Eddy
- Screenplay by: Lillian Taft Maize
- Starring: William Fairbanks; Virginia Lee Corbin; Lee Shumway; Robert Bolder; J.J. Bryson; Daniel Belmont
- Cinematography: George Meehan
- Production company: Columbia Pictures
- Distributed by: Columbia Pictures
- Release date: December 1, 1925
- Running time: 50 minutes
- Country: United States
- Language: Silent (English intertitles)

The Handsome Brute is a lost 1925 American silent drama film directed by Robert Eddy and written by Lillian Taft Maize. The film stars William Fairbanks, Virginia Lee Corbin, Lee Shumway, Robert Bolder, J.J. Bryson, and Daniel Belmont. The film was released on December 1, 1925, by Columbia Pictures.

== Plot ==
As described in a film magazine review, patrolman Larry O'Day loses his job on the police force due to a misadventure in which jeweler Thomas Egan's daughter Nelly is concerned. International famous detective John Granger is aiding the police in pursuit of the notorious Brady gang. Larry takes a hand in the game, and after a fight he captures Granger and two confederates while they were looting the Egan store. It transpires that the real Granger is dead, and a crook has been impersonating him. Larry is reinstated with the police force, promoted, and then marries Nelly.

== Cast ==
- William Fairbanks as Larry O'Day
- Virginia Lee Corbin as Nelly Egan
- Lee Shumway as John Granger
- Robert Bolder as Thomas Egan
- J.J. Bryson as Captain
- Daniel Belmont as Watchman
