= The Squealer =

1930 film

- Directed by: Harry Joe Brown
- Written by: Mark Linder (play); Dorothy Howell; Casey Robinson; Jo Swerling
- Produced by: Harry Cohn
- Starring: Jack Holt; Dorothy Revier; Davey Lee
- Cinematography: Ted Tetzlaff
- Edited by: Leonard Wheeler
- Production company: Columbia Pictures
- Distributed by: Columbia Pictures
- Release date: August 20, 1930
- Running time: 67 minutes
- Country: United States
- Language: English

The Squealer is a 1930 American pre-Code crime film directed by Harry Joe Brown, and starring Jack Holt, Dorothy Revier and Davey Lee.

The film's sets were designed by the art director Edward C. Jewell.

== Cast ==
- Jack Holt as Charles Hart
- Dorothy Revier as Margaret Hart
- Davey Lee as Bunny Hart
- Matt Moore as John Sheridan
- Zasu Pitts as Bella
- Robert Ellis as Valleti
- Matthew Betz as Red Majors
- Arthur Housman as Mitter Davis
- Cesar Miramontes as Pablo
- Louis Natheaux as Ratface Edwards
- Eddie Kane as Whisper
- Eddie Sturgis as The Killer

== Bibliography ==
- Charles Stumpf. ZaSu Pitts: The Life and Career. McFarland, 2010.
