= The Down Grade =

1927 film

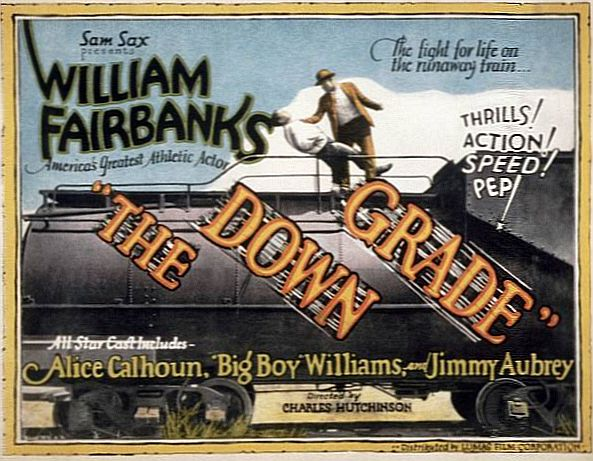
- Directed by: Charles Hutchison
- Written by: Robert Welles Ritchie
- Produced by: Samuel Sax
- Starring: William Fairbanks; Alice Calhoun; Charles K. French
- Cinematography: James S. Brown Jr.
- Production company: Gotham Productions
- Distributed by: Lumas Film Corporation
- Release date: June 25, 1927
- Running time: 50 minutes
- Country: United States
- Languages: Silent; English intertitles

The Down Grade is a 1927 American silent action film directed by Charles Hutchison and starring William Fairbanks, Alice Calhoun and Charles K. French.

== Cast ==
- William Fairbanks as Ted Lanning
- Alice Calhoun as Molly Crane
- Charles K. French as Mr. Lanning
- Guinn 'Big Boy' Williams as Ed Holden
- Jimmy Aubrey as The Runt

== Bibliography ==
- Munden, Kenneth White. The American Film Institute Catalog of Motion Pictures Produced in the United States, Part 1. University of California Press, 1997.
