= The Cowboy and the Flapper =

1924 film

- Directed by: Alan James
- Written by: Jefferson Moffitt
- Produced by: Phil Goldstone
- Starring: William Fairbanks; Dorothy Revier; Jack Richardson
- Cinematography: Roland Price
- Production company: Phil Goldstone Productions
- Distributed by: Truart Film Corporation
- Release date: August 25, 1924
- Running time: 52 minutes
- Country: United States
- Languages: Silent; English intertitles

The Cowboy and the Flapper is a 1924 American silent Western film directed by Alan James and starring William Fairbanks, Dorothy Revier and Jack Richardson.

== Cast ==
- William Fairbanks as Dan Patterson
- Dorothy Revier as Alice Allison
- Jack Richardson as Red Carson
- Milton Ross as Col. Allison
- Morgan Davis as Deputy Jack Harrison
- Andrew Waldron as Al Lyman
- Fred Haynes as Handsome Ed Burns

== Reception ==
Variety gave the film a mixed review, praising the directing and performances, but criticizing the use of the flapper in the film. The reviewer opined that the character was "not particularly flapperish nor unique." Variety also criticized the film for its editing, where it suddenly switches between the adventures of the outlaw and the love interest.

== See also ==
- Code of the West, a similar 1925 silent Western film featuring a flapper character
