= The Price She Paid (1924 film) =

1924 film

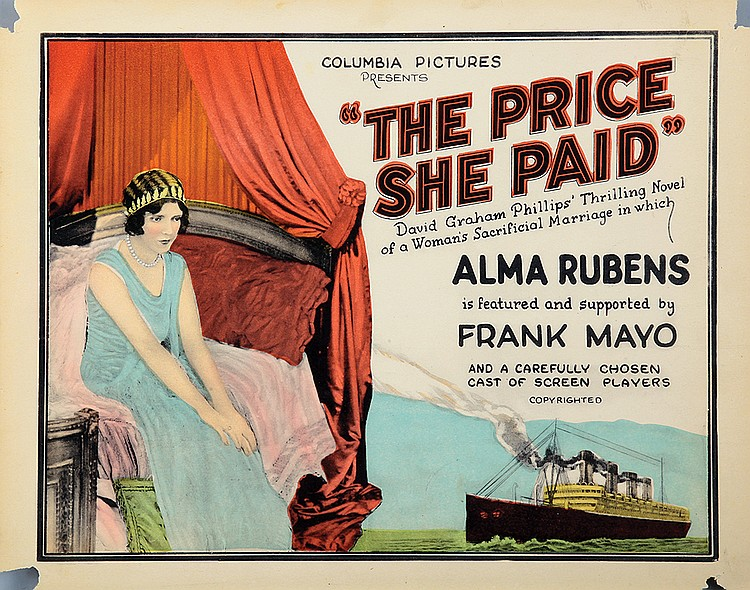
- Directed by: Henry MacRae
- Written by: David Graham Phillips
- Starring: Alma Rubens; Frank Mayo; Eugenie Besserer
- Production company: Columbia Pictures
- Distributed by: Celebrated Players Film Corporation of Wisconsin
- Release date: September 15, 1924
- Running time: 55 minutes
- Country: United States
- Languages: Silent; English intertitles

The Price She Paid (1924)

The Price She Paid is a 1924 American silent drama film directed by Henry MacRae and starring Alma Rubens, Frank Mayo, and Eugenie Besserer.

== Cast ==
- Alma Rubens as Mildred Gower
- Frank Mayo as Dr. Donald Keith
- Eugenie Besserer as Mrs. Elton Gower
- William Welsh as General Lemuel Sidall
- Lloyd Whitlock as Jack Prescott
- Otto Hoffman as Seth Kehr
- Edwards Davis as Attorney Ellison
- Wilfred Lucas as James Presbury
- Ed Brady as Deputy Sheriff
- Freeman Wood as Stanley Baird

== Preservation and status ==
A complete 35 mm copy is held at the George Eastman House.

== Bibliography ==
- Bernard F. Dick. Columbia Pictures: Portrait of a Studio. University Press of Kentucky, 2015.
