= Racing for Life =

1924 film by Henry MacRae

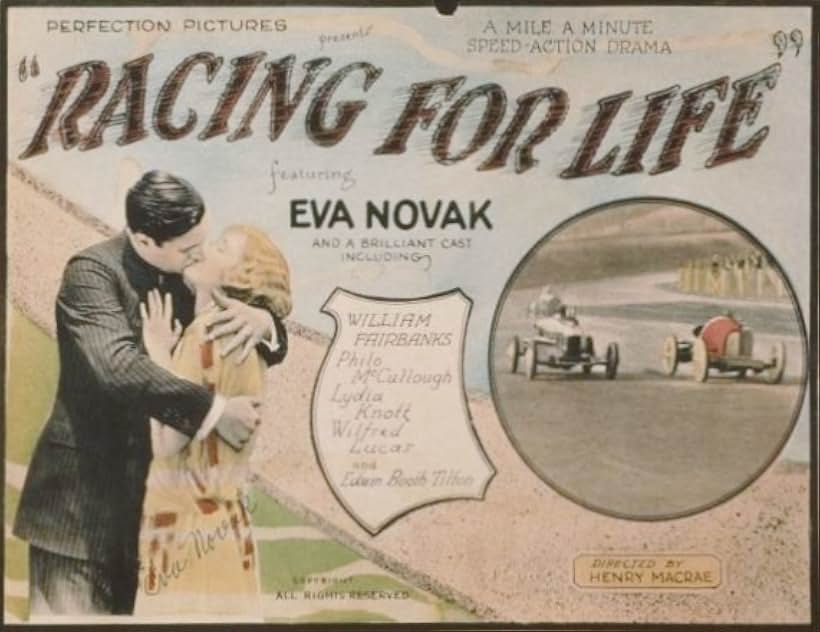
- Directed by: Henry MacRae
- Written by: Wilfred Lucas
- Starring: Eva Novak; William Fairbanks; Philo McCullough
- Cinematography: Allen Q. Thompson
- Production company: Columbia Pictures
- Distributed by: Columbia Pictures
- Release date: August 8, 1924
- Running time: 50 minutes
- Country: United States
- Languages: Silent; English intertitles

Racing for Life is a 1924 American silent action film directed by Henry MacRae and starring Eva Novak, William Fairbanks and Philo McCullough.

== Cast ==
- Eva Novak as Grace Danton
- William Fairbanks as Jack Grant
- Philo McCullough as Carl Grant
- Wilfred Lucas as Hudford
- Ralph DePalma as The Champion
- Lydia Knott as Mrs. Grant
- Frankie Darro as Jimmy Danton
- Edwin B. Tilton as David Danton
- Frank Whitson as Hudford's partner
- Harley Moore as Murray
- Harry La Verne as Diggett
- George Atkinson as Jackson Heath
- Paul J. Derkum as Race Starter
- Edgar Kennedy as Tom Grady

== Preservation and status ==
A copy with one reel missing survives at the BFI National Film and Television Article.

== Bibliography ==
- Munden, Kenneth White. The American Film Institute Catalog of Motion Pictures Produced in the United States, Part 1. University of California Press, 1997.
