= A Fight to the Finish (1925 film) =

1925 film directed by B. Reeves Eason

- Directed by: B. Reeves Eason
- Written by: Dorothy Howell
- Starring: William Fairbanks; Phyllis Haver; Tom Ricketts
- Cinematography: George Meehan
- Production company: Columbia Pictures
- Distributed by: Columbia Pictures
- Release date: November 11, 1925
- Running time: 50 minutes
- Country: United States
- Language: Silent (English intertitles)

A Fight to the Finish is a 1925 American silent drama film directed by B. Reeves Eason and starring William Fairbanks, Phyllis Haver and Tom Ricketts.

== Plot ==
As described in a film magazine review, Jim Davis, a young man whose father has turned him out without a cent, becomes embroiled in a street fight and defeats a man whom he later discovers is the state boxing champion in his division. Mary Corbett encourages Jim to challenge the champion in the ring, aiming to earn enough money to prove to his father that he can support himself. The ring fight is arranged, but Jim loses due to being drugged. However, in the dressing room after the bout, he decisively defeats the champion. Subsequently, he wins the affection of the young woman.

== Cast ==
- William Fairbanks as Jim Davis
- Phyllis Haver as Mary Corbett
- Tom Ricketts as Cyrus J. Davis
- Pat Harmon as Pat O'Brien
- William Bolder as Henry McBride
- Leon Beaumon as Battling Wilson

== Preservation and status ==
A complete copy of the film is held at the Library of Congress.

== Bibliography ==
- Bingmann, Melissa (2015). Prep School Cowboys: Ranch Schools in the American West. University of New Mexico Press. ISBN 978-0-8263-5543-0.
