= Henry MacRae =

Canadian film director (1876–1944)

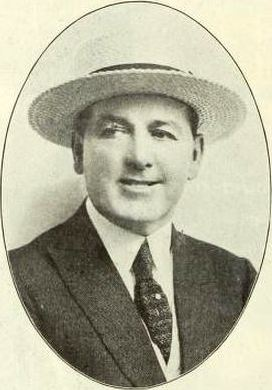
- MacRae in 1921
- Born: August 29, 1876; Toronto, Ontario, Canada
- Died: October 2, 1944 (aged 68); Beverly Hills, California, USA
- Occupations: Film director; screenwriter; film producer

Henry Alexander MacRae (August 29, 1876 – October 2, 1944) was a Canadian film director, producer, and screenwriter during the silent era. One of a number of Canadian pioneers in early Hollywood, MacRae was credited with many innovations in film production, including artificial light for interiors, the wind machine, double exposures, and shooting at night.

MacRae is best known to film buffs as the head of Universal Pictures' serial unit. He joined the company in 1911 and began making serials in 1914, when the Pathé studio's The Perils of Pauline popularized the chapter-play format. MacRae remained in charge of Universal's serial production for three full decades, until his death in 1944. Among his landmark serials are The Indians Are Coming (1929), Flash Gordon (1936), Buck Rogers (1939), The Green Hornet (1940), and Gang Busters (1942).

== Biography ==
Henry MacRae was born in Toronto, Ontario, Canada on August 29, 1876. He was active as a director from 1912 to 1933, making more than 130 films, most of them silent. In addition to the many westerns and adventure films to his credit, he directed the first Thai-Hollywood co-production, Miss Suwanna of Siam, in 1923.

His first talking picture was the first Tarzan movie with sound, Tarzan the Tiger in 1929. He also made several westerns, variously starring Hoot Gibson, Tom Mix, Buck Jones, and Rex the Wonder Horse.

Henry MacRae died in Beverly Hills, California, United States on October 2, 1944, aged 68. He was succeeded at Universal by associate producer Morgan B. Cox.

== Selected filmography ==
- In the Coils of the Python (1913)
- The Girl and the Tiger (1913)
- In the Secret Service (1913)
- The Werewolf (1913)
- The Trey o' Hearts (1914)
- Coral (1915)
- The Conspiracy (1916)
- Behind the Lines (1916)
- Liberty (1916)
- Guilty (1916)
- The Mystery Ship (1917)
- Man and Beast (1917)
- The Bronze Bride (1917)
- Money Madness (1917)
- Bull's Eye (1917)
- The Phantom Riders (1918)
- Elmo the Mighty (1919)
- The Dragon's Net (1920)
- Cameron of the Royal Mounted (1921)
- The Man from Glengarry (1922)
- Miss Suwanna of Siam (1923)
- Glengarry School Days (1923)
- Racing for Life (1924)
- A Fight for Honor (1924)
- The Price She Paid (1924)
- Tainted Money (1924)
- Ace of Spades (1925)
- The Scarlet Streak (1925)
- The Fearless Lover (1925)
- Strings of Steel (1926)
- The Trail of the Tiger (1927)
- Wild Beauty (1927)
- Two Outlaws (1928)
- Wild Blood (1928)
- Burning the Wind (1929)
- Tarzan the Tiger (1929)
- The Ace of Scotland Yard (1929)
- The Harvest of Hate (1929)
- Smilin' Guns (1929)
- Plunging Hoofs (1929)
- The Indians Are Coming (1930)
- The Jade Box (1930)
- The Lost Special (1932)
- Flash Gordon (1936)
- Buck Rogers (1939)
- Gang Busters (1942)
