= Fighting Youth (1925 film) =

1925 film

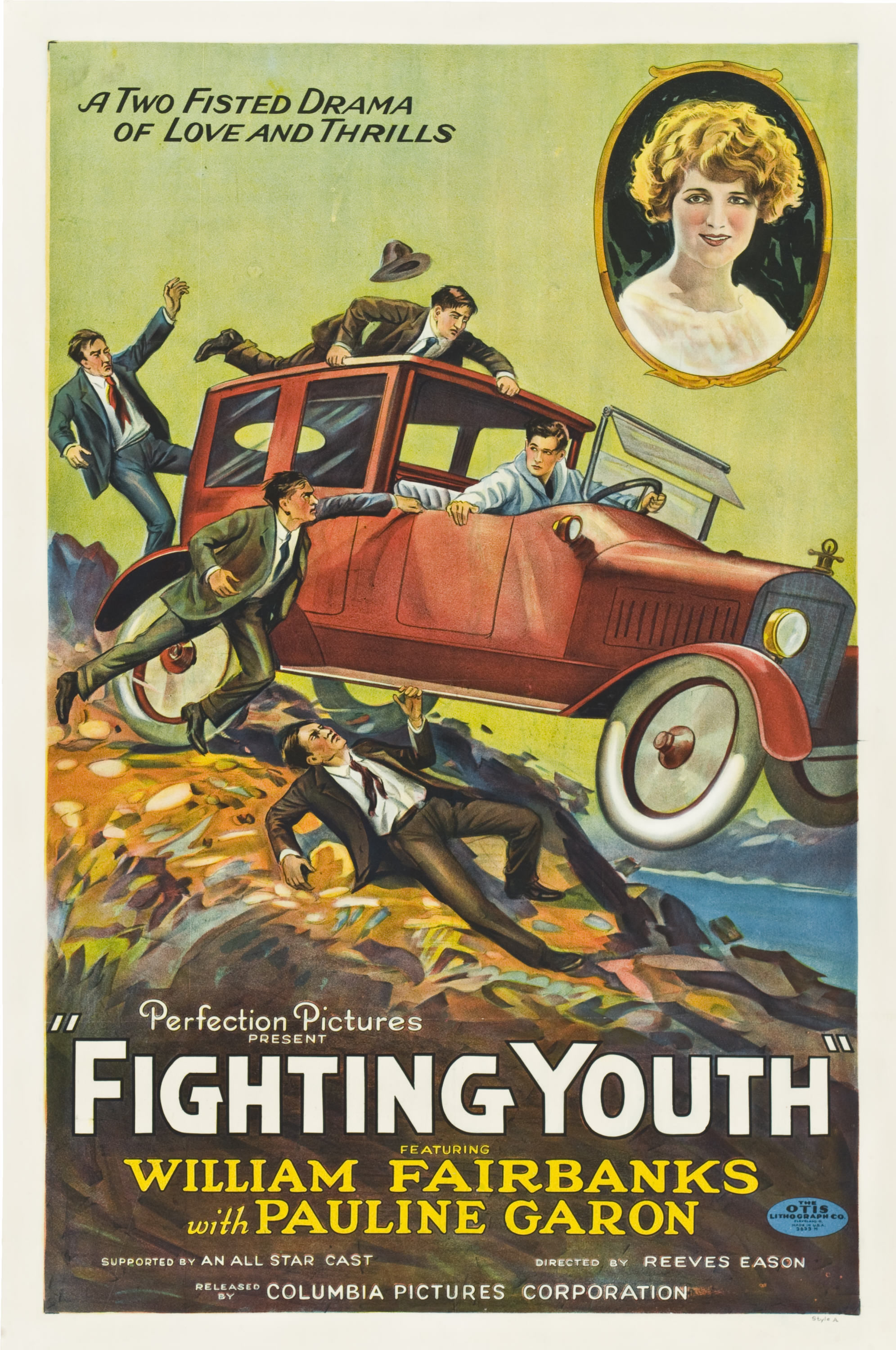
- Directed by: B. Reeves Eason
- Written by: Paul Archer; Dorothy Howell
- Starring: William Fairbanks; Pauline Garon; George Periolat
- Cinematography: George Meehan
- Production company: Columbia Pictures
- Distributed by: Columbia Pictures
- Release date: June 28, 1925
- Running time: 50 minutes
- Country: United States
- Languages: Silent; English intertitles

Fighting Youth is a lost 1925 American silent action film directed by B. Reeves Eason and starring William Fairbanks, Pauline Garon and George Periolat. A notorious brawler promises his fiancée that he will give up fighting, but then is persuaded to take party in a charity boxing match.

== Cast ==
- William Fairbanks as Dick Covington
- Pauline Garon as Jean Manley
- George Periolat as Judge Manley
- William Bailey as Harold Brennty
- Pat Harmon as Paddy O'Ryan
- Frank Hagney as 'Murdering' Mooney
- Thomas Carr as Gangster
- Jack Britton as Referee

== Bibliography ==
- Munden, Kenneth White. The American Film Institute Catalog of Motion Pictures Produced in the United States, Part 1. University of California Press, 1997.
