= Barriers of Folly =

1922 film

- Directed by: Edward A. Kull
- Written by: Thomas Berrien; Theodore Rockwell
- Starring: George Larkin; Eva Novak; Wilfred Lucas
- Production company: Clinton Productions
- Distributed by: Russell Productions
- Release date: November 1922
- Running time: 50 minutes
- Country: United States
- Languages: Silent; English intertitles

Barriers of Folly is a 1922 American silent Western film directed by Edward A. Kull and starring George Larkin, Eva Novak and Wilfred Lucas.

== Cast ==
- George Larkin as Jim Buckley
- Eva Novak as May Gordon
- Wilfred Lucas as Wallace Clifton
- Lillian West as Madge Spencer
- Bud Osborne as Perry Wilson
- Karl Silvera as Wong Foo

== Preservation ==
With no holdings located in archives, Barriers of Folly is considered a lost film.

== Bibliography ==
- Connelly, Robert B. The Silents: Silent Feature Films, 1910-36, Volume 40, Issue 2. December Press, 1998.
- Munden, Kenneth White. The American Film Institute Catalog of Motion Pictures Produced in the United States, Part 1. University of California Press, 1997.
