= The Mile-a-Minute Man =

1926 film

- Directed by: Jack Nelson
- Written by: Edward J. Meagher
- Starring: William Fairbanks; Virginia Brown Faire; George Periolat
- Cinematography: Arthur Reeves
- Production company: Camera Pictures
- Distributed by: Lumas Film Corporation
- Release date: December 1926
- Running time: 50 minutes
- Country: United States
- Language: Silent (English intertitles)

The Mile-a-Minute Man is a 1926 American silent drama film directed by Jack Nelson and starring William Fairbanks, Virginia Brown Faire, and George Periolat. It was produced by the independent Gotham Pictures. The plot revolves around two rival automobile producers and their respective son and daughter who are in love.

== Plot ==
As described in a film magazine review, Old Ironsides Rockett, the owner of an automobile factory, loves his business rival Mrs. Greydon, and his son Speedy has come to love his rival's daughter Paula. The rival concern gets out an improved motor for their car "Greyhound," so the father has his son Speedy try to retain the supremacy of their car "Skyrocket." Before the big race the Rockett's attend a social event where James Brett, the son's rival for the love of Paula, has him kidnaped. Speedy escapes after numerous exciting incidents and arrives just in time to enter the race. The two rival cars race to a tie. The father marries his business rival Mrs. Greydon, while his son Speedy marries her daughter Paula.

== Cast ==
- William Fairbanks as S.P. 'Speedy' Rockett
- Virginia Brown Faire as Paula Greydon
- George Periolat as C.O. 'Old Ironsides' Rockett
- Jane Keckley as Mrs. J.P. Greydon
- George Chesebro as James Brett
- Barney Furey as Joe Weeks
- Paul Dennis as Bob
- Hazel Howell as Eleanor Hoyt

== Bibliography ==
- Connelly, Robert B. The Silents: Silent Feature Films, 1910-36, Volume 40, Issue 2. December Press, 1998.
- Munden, Kenneth White. The American Film Institute Catalog of Motion Pictures Produced in the United States, Part 1. University of California Press, 1997.
