= Under the Black Eagle =

1928 film

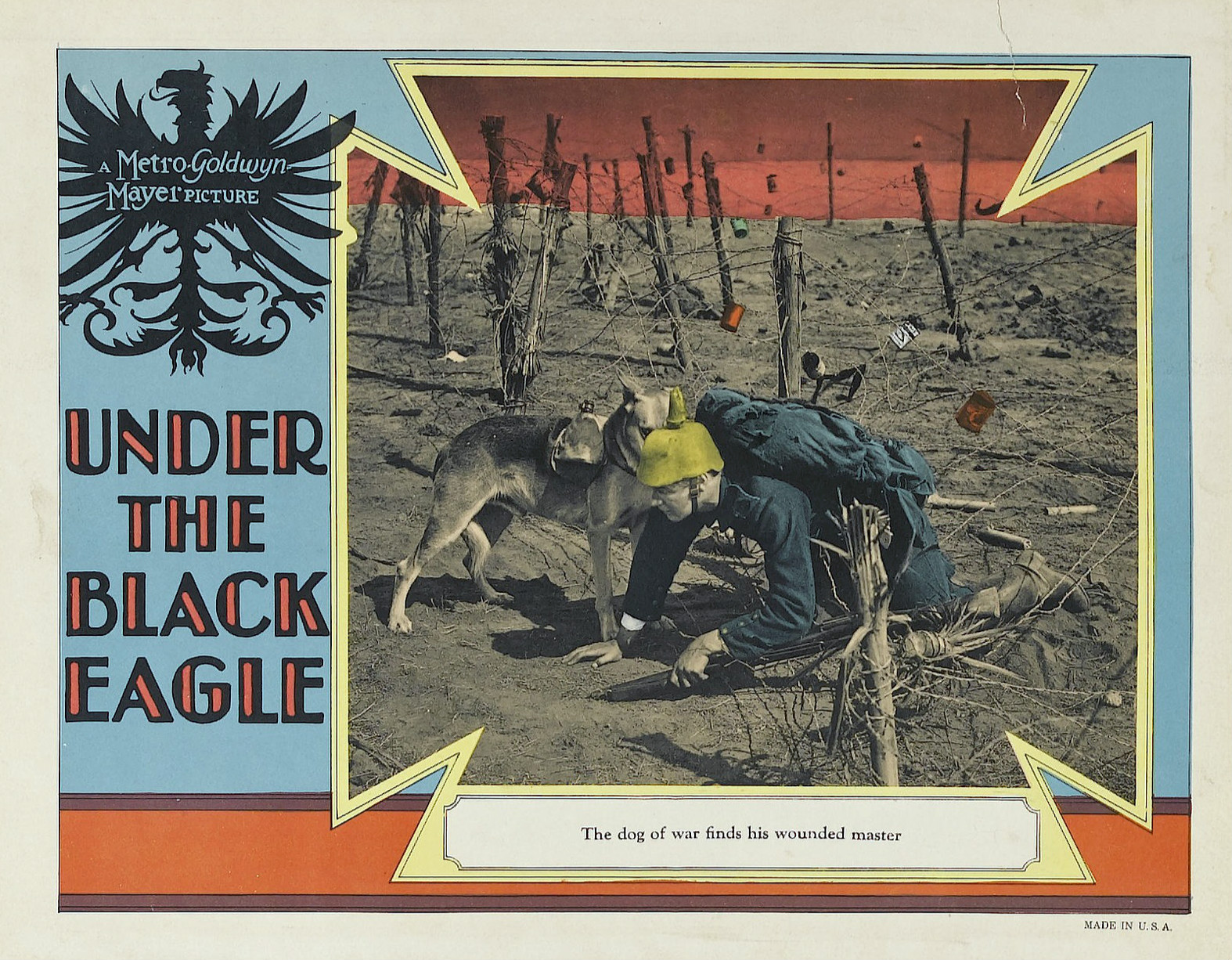
- Lobby card
- Directed by: W. S. Van Dyke
- Screenplay by: Bradley King; Madeleine Ruthven
- Story by: Norman Houston
- Starring: Ralph Forbes; Marceline Day; Bert Roach; William Fairbanks; Marc McDermott
- Cinematography: Hendrik Sartov
- Edited by: Ben Lewis
- Production company: Metro-Goldwyn-Mayer
- Distributed by: Metro-Goldwyn-Mayer
- Release date: March 24, 1928
- Running time: 50 minutes
- Country: United States
- Language: Silent (English intertitles)

Under the Black Eagle is a 1928 American silent World War I drama film directed by W. S. Van Dyke, written by Norman Houston, Bradley King, and Madeleine Ruthven, and starring Ralph Forbes, Marceline Day, Bert Roach, William Fairbanks, and Marc McDermott. The film was released on March 24, 1928, by Metro-Goldwyn-Mayer.

== Cast ==
- Ralph Forbes as Karl von Zorn
- Marceline Day as Margareta
- Bert Roach as Hans Schmidt
- William Fairbanks as Ulrich Muller
- Marc McDermott as Col. Luden
- Flash the Dog as Prinz

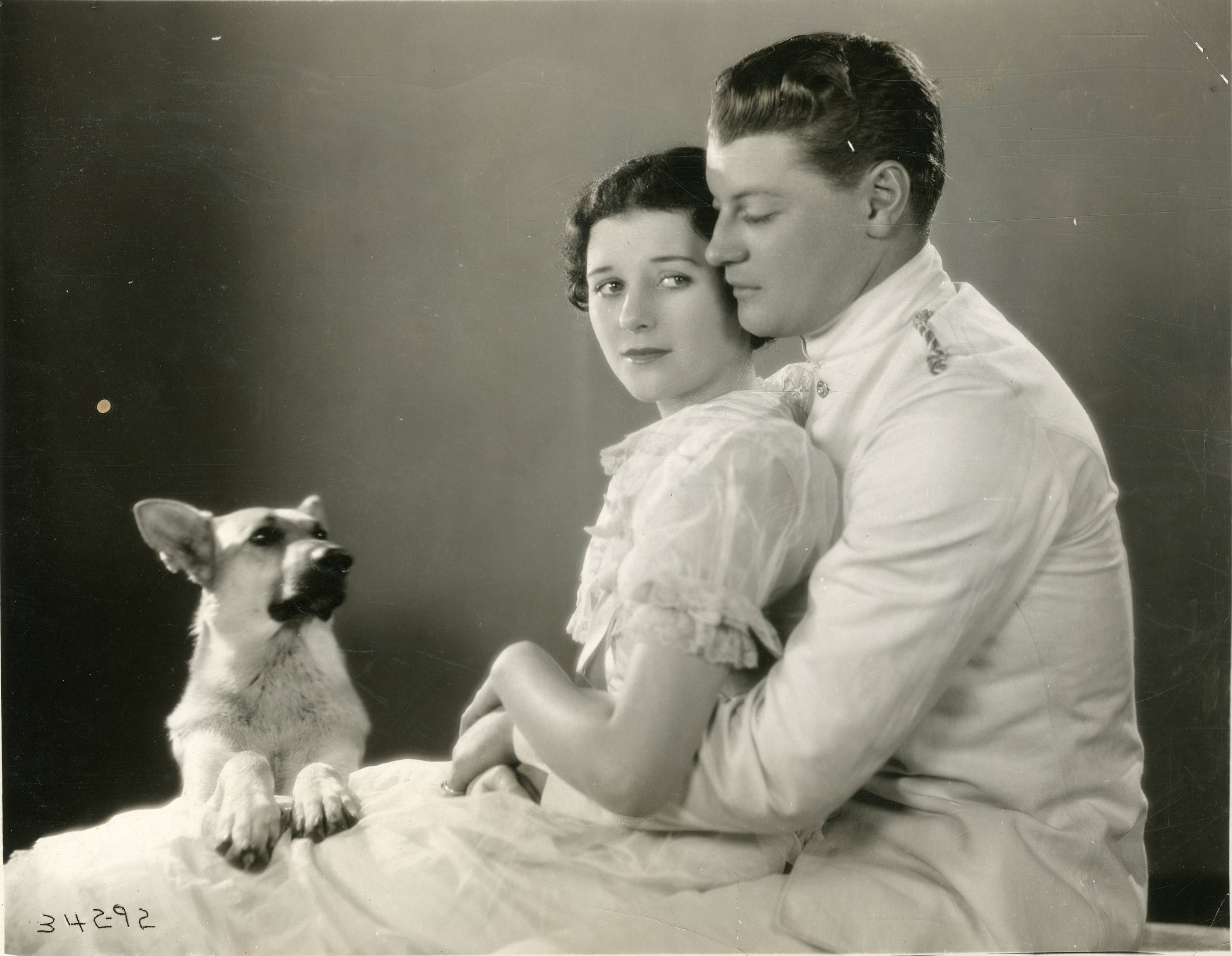
Flash (left)

== Preservation ==
A surviving late silent from 'Woody' Van Dyke, listed as being preserved at the EYE Film Institute Netherlands (Filmmuseum).
