= Men Without Law =

1930 film

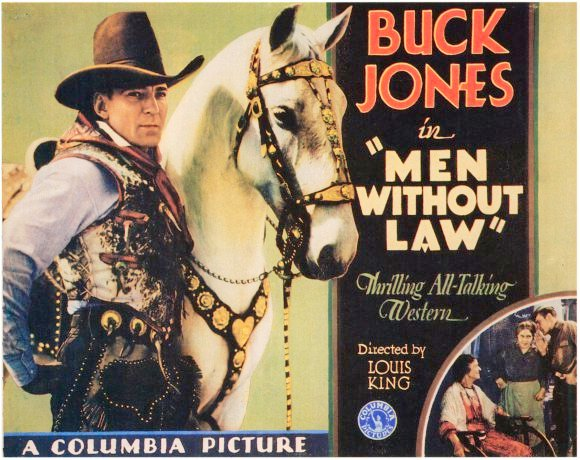
- Lobby card
- Directed by: Louis King
- Screenplay by: Dorothy Howell
- Story by: Lewis Seiler
- Produced by: Sol Lesser
- Starring: Buck Jones; Carmelita Geraghty; Thomas Carr; Lydia Knott; Harry Woods
- Cinematography: Ted McCord
- Edited by: Ray Snyder
- Music by: Mischa Bakaleinikoff (uncredited)
- Production companies: Beverly Pictures Corporation; Sol Lesser Productions; Columbia Pictures
- Distributed by: Columbia Pictures
- Release date: October 15, 1930
- Running time: 65 minutes
- Country: United States
- Language: English

Men Without Law is a 1930 American pre-Code Western film directed by Louis King and starring Buck Jones, Carmelita Geraghty, Thomas Carr, Lydia Knott, and Harry Woods. The film was released by Columbia Pictures on October 15, 1930.

== Cast ==
- Buck Jones as Buck Healy
- Carmelita Geraghty as Juanita del Rey
- Thomas Carr as Tom Healy (as Tommy Carr)
- Lydia Knott as Mrs. Healy
- Harry Woods as Murdock
- Fred Burns as Sheriff Jim
- Syd Saylor as Hank
- Fred Kelsey as Deputy Sheriff Jeff
- Ben Corbett as Pug - Henchman
- Donald Reed as Ramon del Rey
- Hector V. Sarno as Francisco del Rey (as Hector Sarno)
- Silver as Silver - Buck's Horse
- Tom Bay as Tom - Henchman (uncredited)
- Bob Burns as Posse Rider (uncredited)
- Bob Card as Soldier on Train (uncredited)
- Lafe McKee as Townsman (uncredited)
- Art Mix as Henchman (uncredited)
- Bill Nestell as Big Henchman (uncredited)
- George Plues as George - Henchman (uncredited)
- John Wallace as Peg-Leg (uncredited)
