= Eva Novak =

American actress (1898-1988)

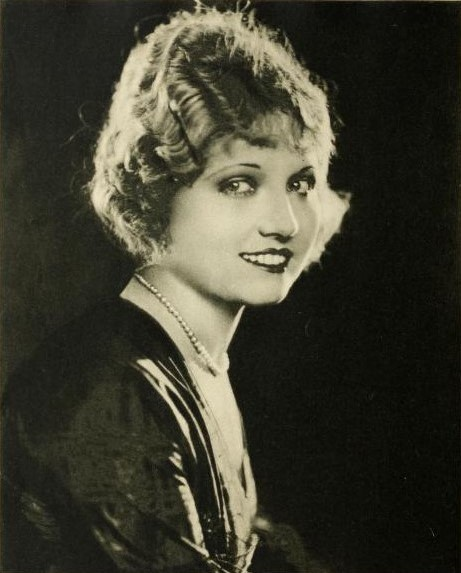
- Novak, early 1920s
- Born: Barbara Eva Novak; February 14, 1898; St. Louis, Missouri, U.S.
- Died: April 17, 1988 (aged 90); Woodland Hills, Los Angeles, U.S.
- Occupation: Actress
- Years active: 1917–1966
- Spouse: William Reed (m. 1921)
- Children: 2
- Relatives: Jane Novak (sister); Anne Schaefer (aunt)

Eva Novak (February 14, 1898 – April 17, 1988) was an American film actress, who was quite popular during the silent film era.

== Biography ==
On February 14, 1898, Barbara Eva Novak was born in St. Louis, Missouri, to Joseph Jerome Novak, an immigrant from Lišov, Bohemia, Austria (now Czech Republic) and Barbara Medek, whose father was born in Kbel. She was baptized Catholic on the 17th at St. Wenceslaus. Joseph J Novak, an editor for the Hlas newspaper, froze on his way to Baden Station on 14 December 1901, after local weather reached -2 °F, a standing record for that day of the month. "Eva" was 3-years-old and Barbara was left to raise five children. Her older sister, Johana, also became an actress. Their older brother, Joseph, worked as head cameraman for Desilu.

Novak began her acting career in 1917 in L-KO's Roped into Scandal, followed by another seven films that same year. She appeared in 17 films in 1918, and another eight in 1919. In 1920, she starred opposite Tom Mix in The Daredevil, one of six film roles she took that year, and one of ten films in which she starred opposite Mix.

In 1921, she married stuntman William Reed, whom she met while on location for a film. They had two daughters Vivian Barbara and Pamela Eve.

Novak was interested in stunt performing herself, having been taught by Mix to perform many of her own stunts. From 1921 to 1928, she appeared in and starred in 48 films, including an early version of Boston Blackie. She also co-starred with Betty Bronson and Jack Benny in The Medicine Man (1930) and appeared in the 1922 film Chasing the Moon, which was an early forerunner of the 1950s film D.O.A. In the late 1920s, she and her husband worked in Australia, where she took the leading roles in two films, For the Term of His Natural Life and The Romance of Runnibede. However, with the advent of "talking films", her popularity faded. She continued to act, but mostly in obscure roles.

Eva Novak acting with Tom Mix in the 1922 film Sky High

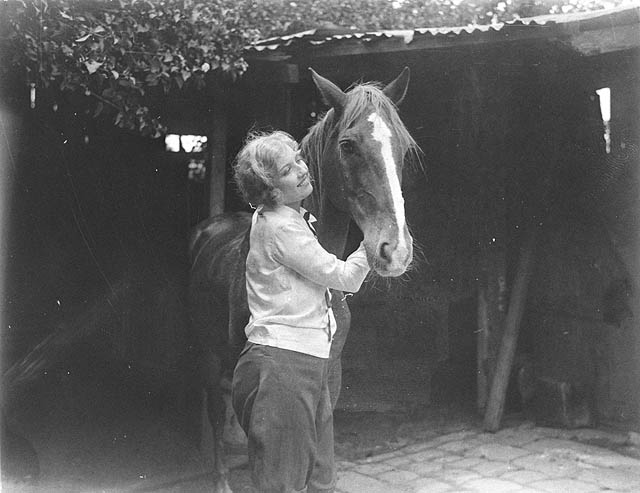
Novak while filming on a set during her stay in Australia, 1927

She appeared in 123 films between 1917 and 1965, when she retired. She was residing in Woodland Hills, Los Angeles at the time of her death from pneumonia at the age of 90, on April 17, 1988.

In May 1923, the Altoona Tribune held a contest to find the girl who most closely resembled Novak. An announcement in the newspaper said that the winner would receive $250 worth of clothes from a store.

== Selected filmography ==
- The King of the Kitchen (1918, short) as Niece
- The Freckled Fish (1919, short)
- The Speed Maniac (1919) as Pearl Matthews
- The Feud (1919) as Betty Brown / Betty Summers
- Wanted at Headquarters (1920) as Kate Westhanger
- The Daredevil (1920) as Alice Spencer
- The Testing Block (1920) as Nelly Gray
- Desert Love (1920) as Dolly Remington
- Up in Mary's Attic (1920) as Mary
- Silk Husbands and Calico Wives (1920) as Georgia Wilson
- O'Malley of the Mounted (1921) as Rose Lanier
- Trailin' (1921) as Sally Fortune
- The Rough Diamond (1921) as Gloria Gomez
- Society Secrets (1921) as Louise
- The Smart Sex (1921) as Rose
- The Torrent (1921) as Velma Patton
- The Last Trail (1921) as Winifred Samson
- Wolves of the North (1921) as Aurora Norris
- The Man from Hell's River (1922) as Mabella
- Sky High (1922) as Estelle Halloway
- Chasing the Moon (1922) as Jane Norworth
- The Man Who Saw Tomorrow (1922) as Vonia
- Making a Man (1922) as Patricia Owens
- Barriers of Folly (1922) as May Gordon
- Up and Going (1922) as Jackie McNabb
- The Great Night (1922) as Mollie Martin
- The Tiger's Claw (1923) as Harriet Halehurst
- A Noise in Newboro (1923) as Anne Paisley
- The Man Life Passed By (1923) as Joy Moore
- Boston Blackie (1923) as Mary Carter
- Dollar Devils (1923) as Amy Andrews
- Temptation (1923) as Marjorie Baldwin
- Missing Daughters (1924) as Eva Rivers
- Listen Lester (1924) as Mary Dodge
- The Beautiful Sinner (1924) as Alice Carter
- The Fatal Mistake (1924) as Ethel Bennett
- Racing for Life (1924) as Grace Danton
- A Fight for Honor (1924) as Margaret Hill
- Lure of the Yukon (1924) as Sue McGraig
- Tainted Money (1924) as Adams' Daughter
- Women First (1924) as Jennie Doon
- Laughing at Danger (1924) as Carolyn Hollister
- The Triflers (1924) as Beatrice Noyes
- Safeguarded (1924)
- The Battling Fool (1924) as Helen Chadwick
- Battling Mason (1924) as Patsy
- The Fearless Lover (1925) as Enid Sexton
- Northern Code (also titled as The Northern Code) (1925) as Marie La Fane
- Sally (1925) as Rosie Lafferty
- Irene (1926) as Eleanor Hadley
- Say It with Babies (1926, short) as Baby Man's Wife
- The Millionaire Policeman (1926) as Mary Gray
- The Dixie Flyer (1926) as Rose Jones / Rose Rapley
- No Man's Gold (1926) as Jane Rogers
- 30 Below Zero (1926) as Ann Ralston
- Red Signals (1927) as Mary Callahan
- Duty's Reward (1927) as Dorothy Thompson
- For the Term of His Natural Life (1927) as Sylvia Vickers
- The Romance of Runnibede (1928)
- The Medicine Man (1930) as Hulda
- The Phantom of the Desert (1930) as Mary Van Horn
- Dangerous Intrigue (1936) as Nurse (uncredited)
- Ride a Crooked Mile (1938) as Cashier (uncredited)
- The Topeka Terror (1945) as Mrs. Green
- Apology for Murder (1945) as Kirkland's Maid
- Corpus Christi Bandits (1945) as Stage Passenger (uncredited)
- Three's a Crowd (1945) as Matron (uncredited)
- Claudia and David (1946) as Maid (uncredited)
- Blackmail (1947) as Mamie
- Four Faces West (1948) as Mrs. Winston
- 3 Godfathers (1948) as Townswoman (uncredited)
- Sunset Boulevard (1950) as Courtier (uncredited)
- Havana Rose (1951) as Matron (uncredited)
- Sergeant Rutledge (1960) as Courtroom Spectator (uncredited)
- The Man Who Shot Liberty Valance (1962) as Townswoman (uncredited)
- The Alfred Hitchcock Hour (1963) (Season 1 Episode 29: "The Dark Pool") as Mrs. Hayes
- Wild Seed (1965) as Mrs. Simms
