= Dorothy Revier =

American actress (1904–1993)

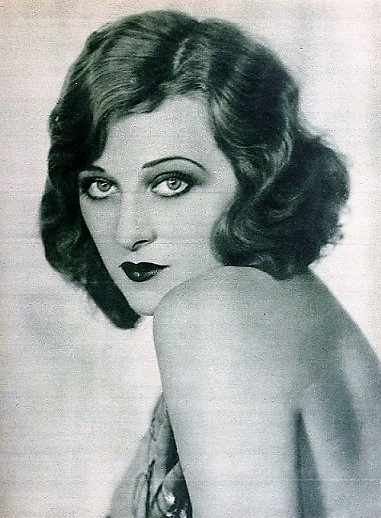
- Revier in 1929
- Born: Doris Valerga; April 18, 1904; San Francisco, California, U.S.
- Died: November 19, 1993 (aged 89); Hollywood, California, U.S.
- Resting place: Forest Lawn Memorial Park, Hollywood Hills
- Occupation: Actress
- Years active: 1921–1936
- Spouse(s): Harry Revier (?–1926); William Pelayo (1950–1964)

Dorothy Revier (born Doris Valerga; April 18, 1904 – November 19, 1993) was an American actress.

== Early years ==
Born as Doris Valerga in San Francisco on April 18, 1904, Revier was one of five siblings of the famous Valerga performing family of the Bay Area. Her mother was English and her father was Italian. She was educated in the public schools of Oakland before going to New York City to study classical dancing.

== Career ==
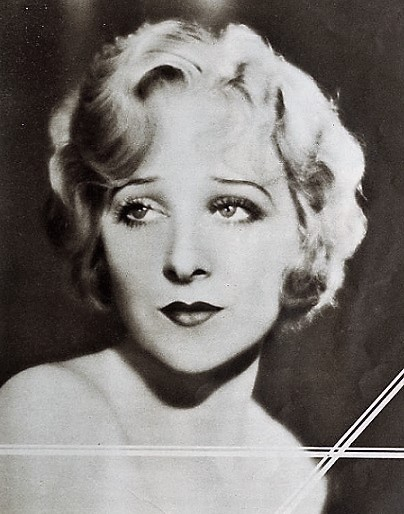
Dorothy Revier c.1930

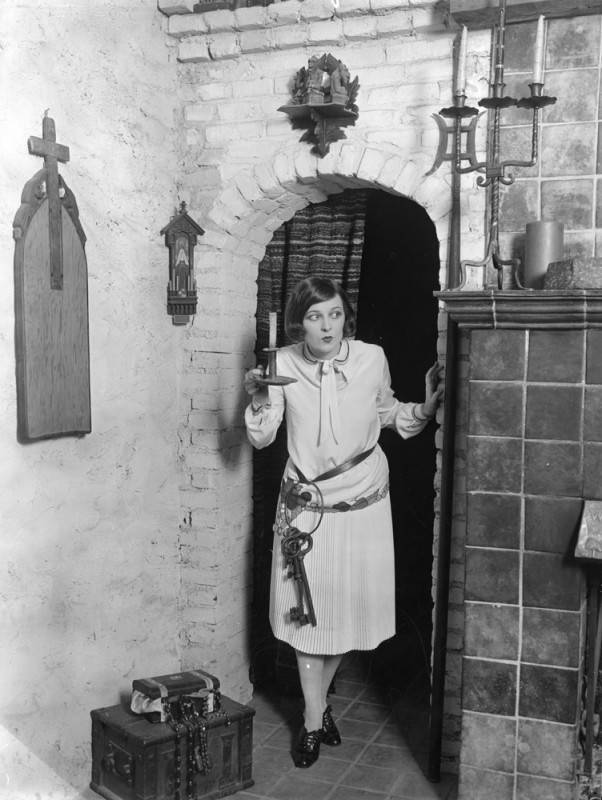
Miss Dorothy Revier, holding a candle and wearing large keys, enters Clyde Browne's Art Studios, located at the Abbey San Encino, on April 13, 1926

Revier danced with a Russian ballet company on tour, but homesickness brought her back to San Francisco, where she became the featured dancer at Tait's Cafe. She was discovered by a talent agent while working in a cabaret and signed to a film contract by Harry Cohn.

She made her film debut in Life's Greatest Question (1921) and was active throughout the 1920s, playing in The Virgin (1924), The Supreme Test (1923), An Enemy of Men (1925), The Far Cry (1926), Cleopatra (1928), Tanned Legs (1929) and The Iron Mask (1929).

After recovering from two broken arms suffered in a 1930 car accident, she played roles in low-budget films for Columbia Pictures. In 1935 she played the role of a saloon girl in Paramount Pictures' second Hopalong Cassidy film, The Eagle's Brood, working alongside William Boyd. In many films she appeared as a vamp, and she later worked as a free-lance performer in Buck Jones Westerns such as Lovable Liar (1933). The Cowboy and the Kid (1936) was her final film.

== Personal life ==
Revier was married to director Harry J. Revier, and to commercial artist William Pelayo. Both marriages ended in divorce.

A resident of West Hollywood, Revier died at the age of 89, at the Queen of Angels-Hollywood Presbyterian Medical Center, and was interred at Forest Lawn – Hollywood Hills Cemetery in Los Angeles area, buried under the simple marker of name and dates, marked with the lone inscription, "Beloved Actress."

== Partial filmography ==
- The Broadway Madonna (1922)
- The Wild Party (1923)
- The Sword of Valor (1924)
- Marry in Haste (1924)
- The Virgin (1924)
- The Cowboy and the Flapper (1924)
- The Martyr Sex (1924)
- The Other Kind of Love (1924)
- The Rose of Paris (1924)
- Do It Now (1924)
- An Enemy Of Men (1925)
- The Danger Signal (1925)
- Sealed Lips (1925)
- The Fate of a Flirt (1925)
- Just a Woman (1925)
- Steppin' Out (1925)
- The Far Cry (1926) – Yvonne Beaudet
- The Better Way (1926)
- Poker Faces (1926)
- When the Wife's Away (1926)
- The False Alarm (1926)
- Poor Girls (1927)
- The Price of Honor (1927)
- Wandering Girls (1927)
- Stolen Pleasures (1927)
- The Clown (1927)
- Beware of Blondes 1928
- The Red Dance (1928)
- Submarine (1928)
- Sinner's Parade (1928)
- Father and Son (1929)
- The Iron Mask (1929)
- The Quitter (1929)
- The Donovan Affair (1929)
- The Dance of Life (1929)
- The Mighty (1929)
- Light Fingers (1929)
- The Way of All Men (1930)
- The Squealer (1930)
- Call of the West (1930)
- Vengeance (1930)
- The Black Camel (1931)
- Anybody's Blonde (1931)
- Left Over Ladies (1931)
- Night World (1932)
- Beauty Parlor (1932)
- The King Murder (1932)
- The Arm of the Law (1932)
- No Living Witness (1932)
- A Scarlet Week-End (1932)
- The Secrets of Wu Sin (1932)
- Above the Clouds (1933)
- Green Eyes (1934)
- Unknown Blonde (1934)
- Circus Shadows (1935)
- Circumstantial Evidence (1935)
- The Lady in Scarlet (1935)
- The Eagle's Brood (1935)
- $20 a Week (1935)
