= Pat Harmon =

American actor

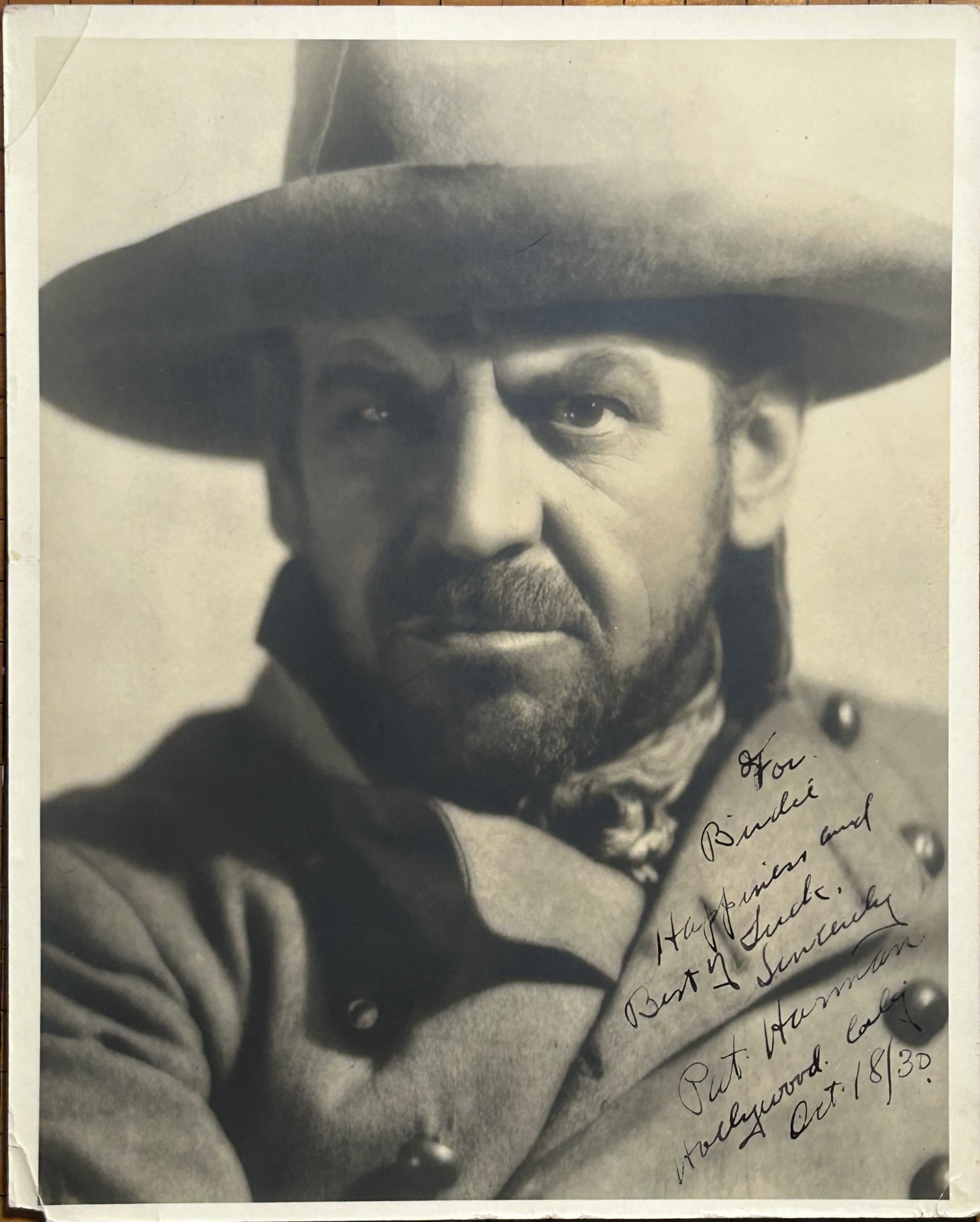
- Signed Photo (1930)
- Born: February 3, 1886; Lewistown, Illinois
- Died: November 26, 1958 (aged 72); Riverside, California
- Occupation: Actor
- Years active: 1920-1947

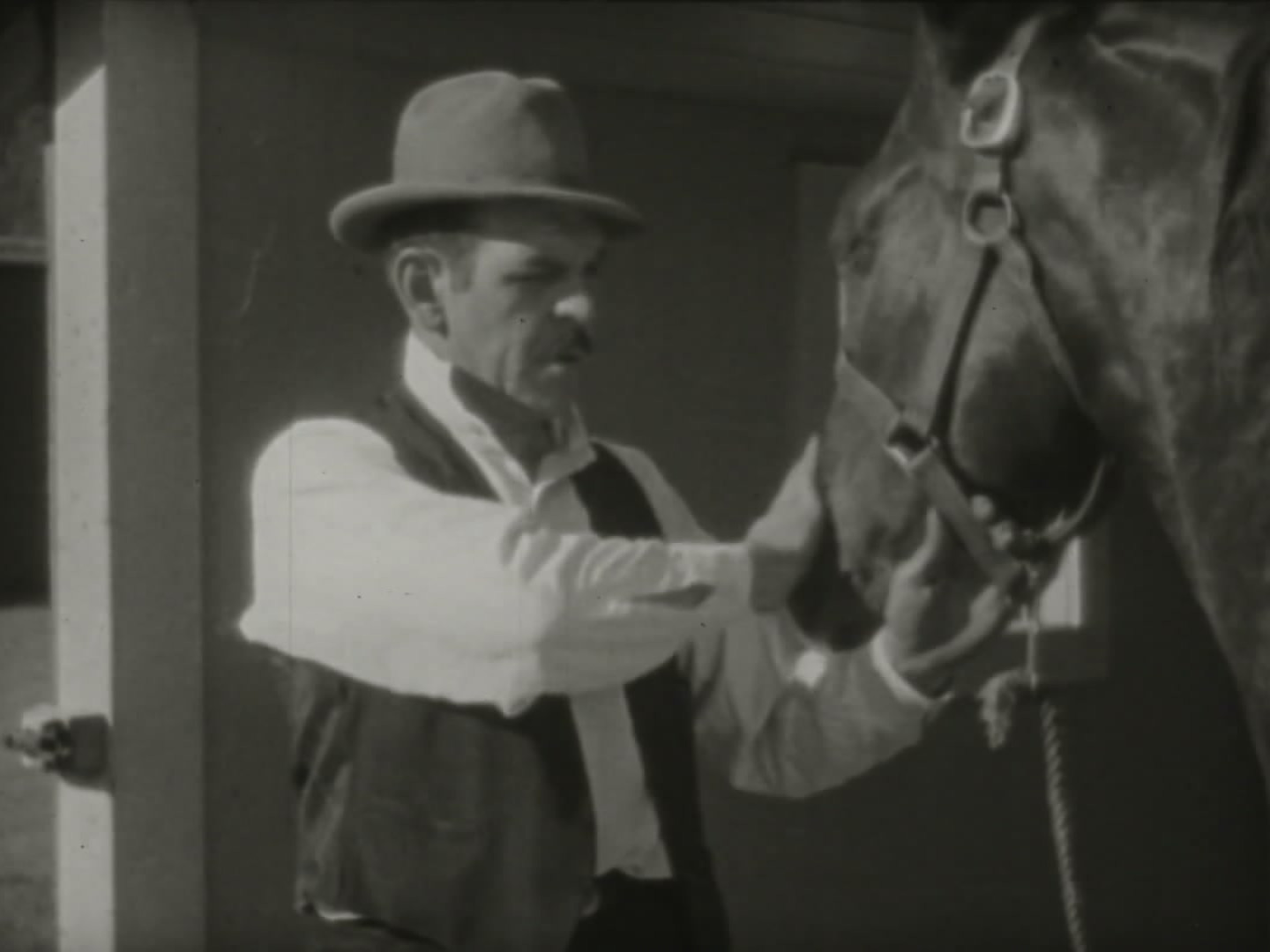
in Winning the Futurity (1926)

Plummer Hull Harman (February 3, 1886 – November 26, 1958), known professionally as Pat Harmon, was an American film actor. He appeared in 166 films between 1920 and 1935, with — reflecting his strength in comedy — his releases including Charles Chaplin's Modern Times (Harmon's last film), as well as Harold Lloyd's Hot Water (1924), The Freshman (1925), and The Cat's Paw (1934), Buster Keaton's Spite Marriage (1929), Free and Easy (1930), Doughboys (1930), and What - No Beer? (1933), Laurel and Hardy's Berth Marks (1930), Pack Up Your Troubles (1932), and Sons of the Desert (1933), Harry Langdon's See America Thirst (1932), and The Marx Brothers’ Monkey Business (1931).

In 1935, Harmon was the victim of a violent assault which resulted in serious facial injuries, and on August 29, 1935, he was sentenced to serve two-to-10 years in Folsom Prison after being found guilty of stealing a horse. After the incidents involved, Harmon's film career ended as he never appeared on screen again.

He was born in Lewistown, Illinois and died in Riverside, California.

== Partial filmography ==
- In the Days of Buffalo Bill (1922)
- Riders of the Law (1922)
- The Kentucky Derby (1922)
- The Firebrand (1922)
- The Phantom Fortune (1923)
- The Shock (1923)
- The Sawdust Trail (1924)
- American Manners (1924)
- Ridgeway of Montana (1924)
- The Back Trail (1924)
- The Battling Fool (1924)
- Behind the Curtain (1924)
- The Martyr Sex (1924)
- Hot Water (1924)
- S.O.S. Perils of the Sea (1925)
- Barriers Burned Away (1925)
- The Lure of the Wild (1925)
- Fighting Youth (1925)
- The Phantom Bullet (1926)
- College Days (1926)
- The Unknown Cavalier (1926)
- The Barrier (1926)
- The Cowboy Cop (1926)
- Sin Cargo (1926)
- Breed of the Sea (1926)
- Winning the Futurity (1926)
- Josselyn's Wife (1926)
- The Bachelor's Baby (1927)
- Snowbound (1927)
- The Haunted Ship (1927)
- Hazardous Valley (1927)
- Lightning (1927)
- The Warning (1927)
- The Sideshow (1928)
- Court Martial (1928)
- Waterfront (1928)
- Sal of Singapore (1928)
- The Broken Mask (1928)
- Sunset Pass (1929)
- Tide of Empire (1929)
- Spite Marriage (1929)
- Small Talk (1929)
- Berth Marks (1929)
- Dark Streets (1929)
- See America Thirst (1930)
- Two-Gun Caballero (1931)
- Secret Menace (1931)
- Malay Nights (1932)
- Battling Buckaroo (1932)
- Another Wild Idea (1934)
- Border Vengeance (1935)
- The Last of the Clintons (1935)
- Trails End (1935)
- Five Bad Men (1935)
