= Wilfred Lucas =

Canadian-American actor, director, and screenwriter (1871–1940)

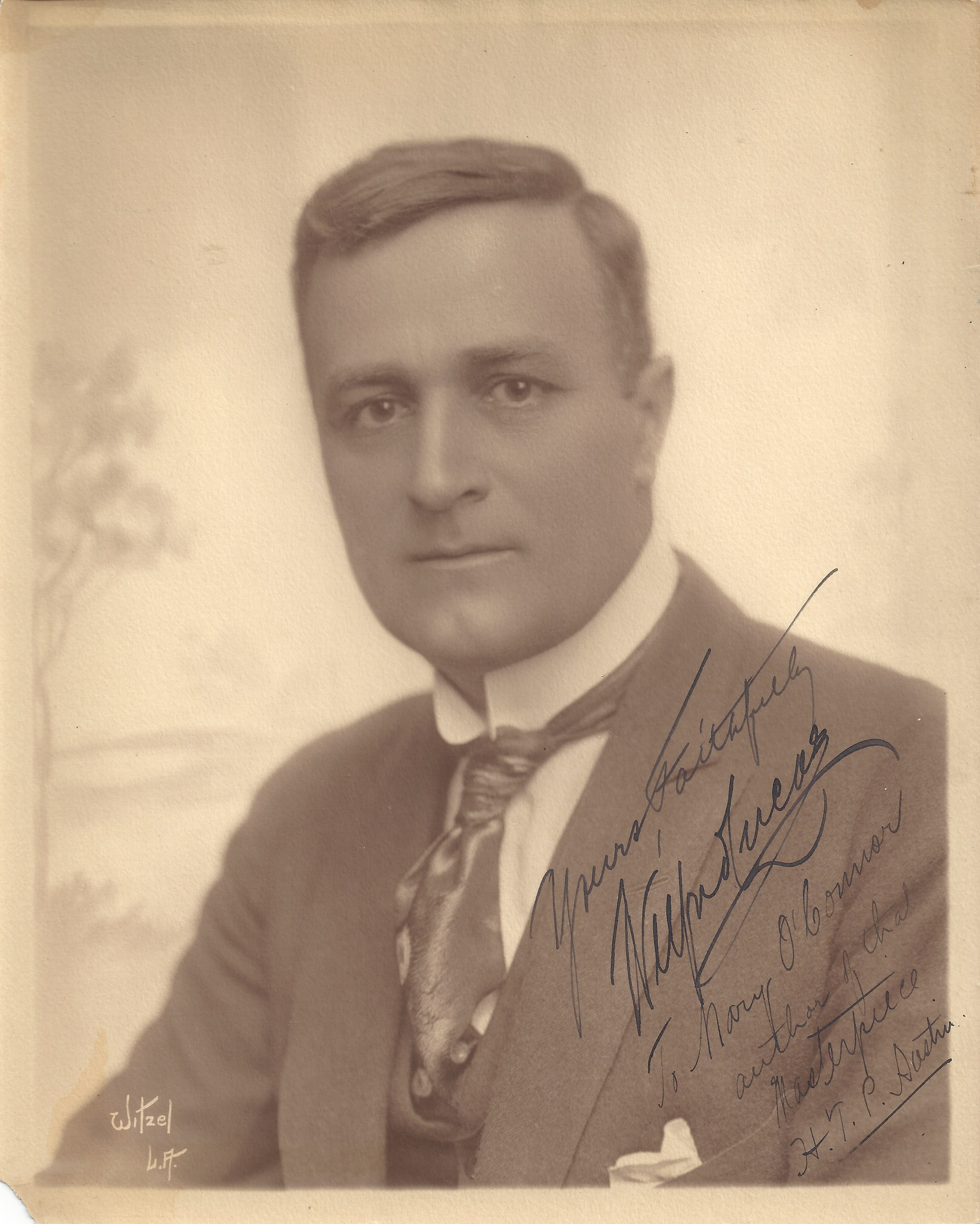
- Lucas in 1916
- Born: Wilfred Van Norman Lucas; January 30, 1871; Norfolk, Ontario, Canada
- Died: December 13, 1940 (aged 69); Los Angeles, California, U.S.
- Resting place: Chapel of the Pines Crematory, Los Angeles
- Occupations: Actor, director, screenwriter
- Years active: 1908–1940 (film)
- Spouses: Louise Perine (m. 1898; div. 190?); Bess Meredyth (m. 1917; div. 1927)
- Children: 4, including John Meredyth Lucas

Wilfred Van Norman Lucas (January 30, 1871 – December 13, 1940) was a Canadian American stage actor who found success in film as an actor, director, and screenwriter.

== Early life ==
Lucas was born in Norfolk County, Ontario on January 30, 1871, most likely in the township of Townsend where at the time his father served as a Wesleyan Methodist minister. He was the youngest of three sons to be raised by Daniel Lucas and the former E. Adeline Reynolds, in Townsend and later Montreal, Quebec. Lucas attended the High School of Montreal and McGill University before immigrating to the United States in the late 1880s. His early career there was that of a baritone singer performing at church functions and at small venues.

== Career ==
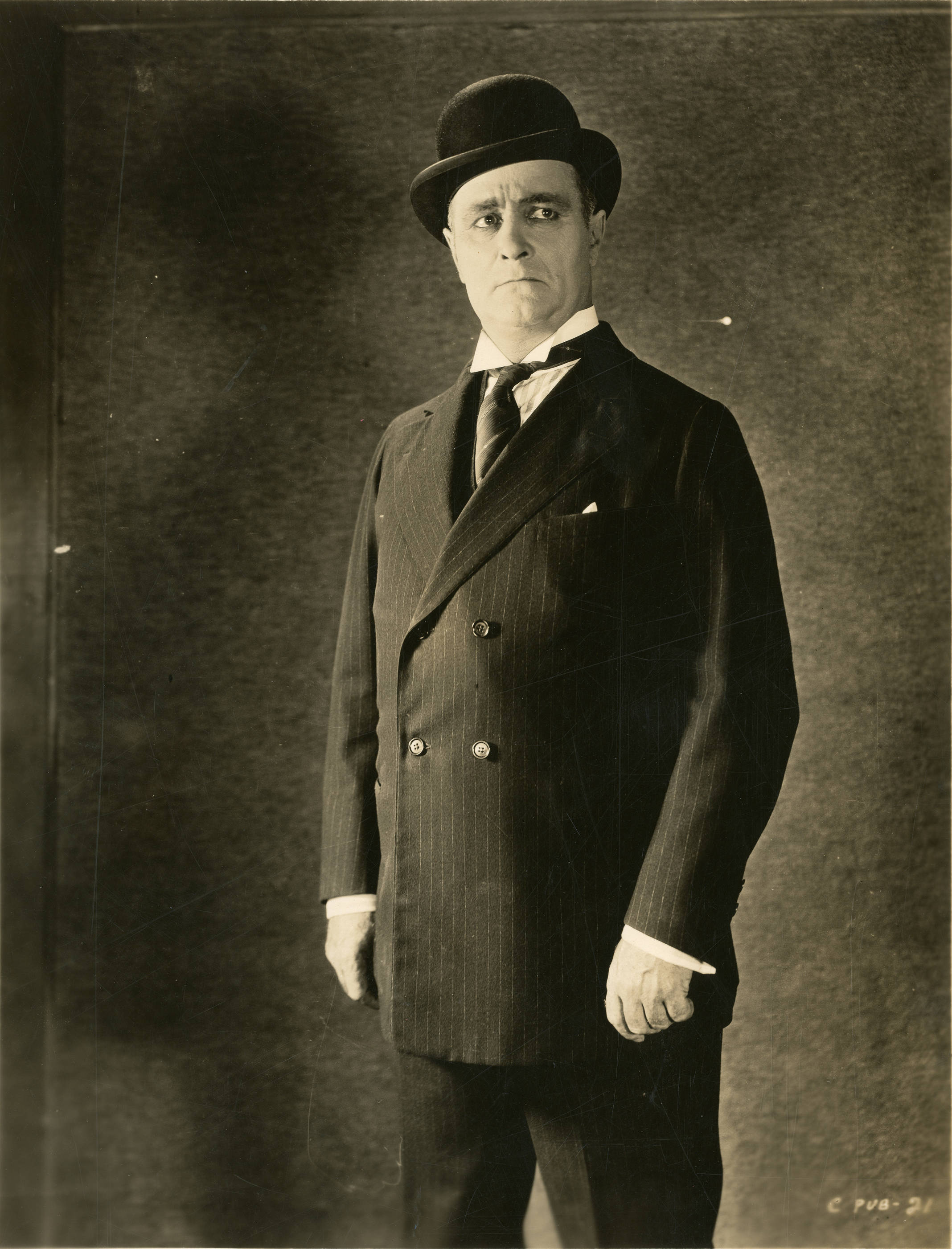
Wilfred Lucas in 1924.

Lucas eventually made a name for himself performing in light and grand opera in America and abroad. He made his Broadway debut on April 4, 1904, at the Savoy Theater playing in both the curtain raiser "The Blue Grass Handicap" and The Superstition of Sue in which he played Sue's brother, Percy Flage. Following his 1906 role in the highly successful play The Chorus Lady, Lucas was recruited to the fledgling Biograph Studios by D. W. Griffith. At the time, the film business was still looked down upon by many members of the theatrical community. In her 1925 book titled When the Movies Were Young, Griffith's wife, actress Linda Arvidson, told the story of the early days at Biograph Studios. In it, she referred to Lucas as the "first real grand actor, democratic enough to work in Biograph movies."

In 1908 Lucas made his motion picture debut in Griffith's The Greaser's Gauntlet, appearing in more than 50 of these short (usually 17 minutes) films over the next two years. In 1910 while still acting, he wrote the script for Griffith's film Sunshine Sue, which was followed by many more scripts by 1924. Lucas also began directing in 1912 with Griffith on An Outcast Among Outcasts, and directed another 44 films over the next 20 years. In early 1916 he starred as John Carter in Acquitted, about which Photoplay wrote, "No single performance in the records of active photography has surpassed his visualization of the humble book-keeper in "Acquitted".

Later in 1916 he appeared in D.W. Griffith's film Intolerance.

Part of the group of Canadian pioneers in early Hollywood, Lucas became friends and sometimes starred with Mary Pickford, Sam De Grasse, and Marie Dressler. Canadian-born director Mack Sennett hired him to both direct and act in a large number of films at his Keystone Studios.

Wilfred Lucas made the successful transition from silent film to sound. While working in Hollywood, in 1926 he returned to the stage, performing in several Broadway plays. He later appeared as a foil for Laurel and Hardy in their feature films Pardon Us, The Devil's Brother and A Chump at Oxford. During his long career, Wilfred Lucas appeared in more than 375 films. Although for a time he was cast in leading roles, he became very successful as secondary and minor characters, making a good living in the film industry for more than three decades.

== Personal life ==
On October 10, 1898, Lucas, by then a member of a stock company headed by actor James Durkin, wed fellow cast member Louise Perine at Elmira, New York. The couple went on to have two sons, Wilfred "Irving" Lucas, Kirke LaShelle Lucas, and one daughter, Alice Van Norman Lucas, before their divorce sometime before 1910. Five years after he married Louise, Lucas became an American citizen at a ceremony held in San Bernardino, California.

While working at Biograph Studios, Wilfred Lucas met and ultimately married actress/screenwriter Bess Meredyth (1890–1969) with whom he had a son. John Meredyth Lucas (1919–2002) became a successful writer and director including a number of episodes of Mannix and Star Trek. John Lucas wrote about his sometimes strained relationship with his father after his parents divorced in his book Eighty Odd Years in Hollywood: Memoir of a Career in Film and Television (2004)

== Death ==
Wilfred Lucas died on December 13, 1940, in Los Angeles and was previously inurned in the private vault at the Chapel of the Pines Crematory.

In 2023, the group of fans arranged to have Lucas' cremains were removed from non-public vaultage in the basement of the crematory to a publicly accessible niche in the chapel columbarium.

== Selected filmography ==
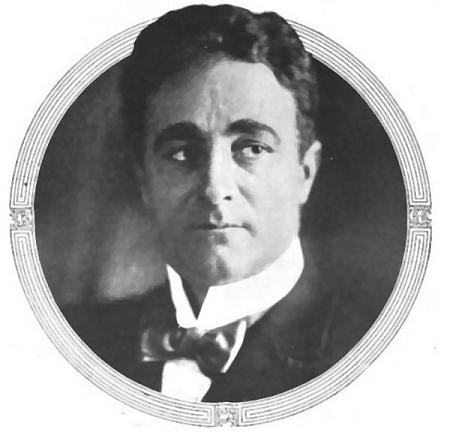
Wilfred Lucas

- The Greaser's Gauntlet (1908, Short) - Jose
- The Girl and the Outlaw (1908, Short)
- Ingomar, the Barbarian (1908, Short)
- The Vaquero's Vow (1908, Short)
- The Honor of Thieves (1909, Short)
- The Rocky Road (1910, short)
- Fisher Folks (1911)
- Heart Beats of Long Ago (1911)
- The Lonedale Operator (1911)
- The Indian Brothers (1911)
- The Miser's Heart (1911)
- The Transformation of Mike (1912)
- Under Burning Skies (1912)
- The Girl and Her Trust (1912, Short) - Jack, Railroad Express Agent
- Just Like a Woman (1912, Short)
- The Sands of Dee (1912, Short)
- Gold Is Not All (1913)
- The Speed Kings (1913, Short)
- The Spanish Jade (1915) - Osmund Manvers
- The Lily and the Rose (1915) - Jack Van Norman
- The Wood Nymph (1916) - Fred Arnold
- Acquitted (1916) - John Carter
- Macbeth (1916) - Macduff
- A Wild Girl of the Sierras (1916) - Jim Hamilton
- Hell-to-Pay Austin (1916) - Hell-to-Pay Austin
- Intolerance (1916) - Extra (uncredited)
- The Rummy (1916) - The Rummy
- The Microscope Mystery (1916) - Doc Arnold
- Jim Bludso (1917) - Jim Bludso
- A Love Sublime (1917) - Philip
- Hands Up! (1917) - John Houston
- Souls Triumphant (1917) - Robert Powers
- Her Excellency, the Governor (1917) - James Barclay
- The Food Gamblers (1917) - Henry Havens
- Sins of Ambition (1917) - Andrew Maxwell
- The Co-Respondent (1917) - Richard Manning
- The Judgment House (1917) - Rudyard Byng
- What Every Woman Wants (1919) - Horace Lennon
- The Hushed Hour (1919) - Robert Appleton Jr.
- The Westerners (1919) - Jim Buckley
- The Girl from Nowhere (1919) - Diamond Terry
- A Woman of Pleasure (1919) - Sir John Thornbull
- Soldiers of Fortune (1919) - President Alvarez
- The Return of Mary (1919)
- The Man from Kangaroo (1920) - Red Jack Braggan
- The Jackeroo of Coolabong (1920) - John MacDonald
- The Breaking Point (1921) - Mortimer Davidson
- Through the Back Door (1921) - Elton Reeves
- One a Minute (1921) - Prosecutor (uncredited)
- The Fighting Breed (1921) - John MacDonald
- The Shadow of Lightning Ridge (1921) - Edward Mariott
- The Beautiful Liar (1921) - Gaston Allegretti
- Across the Deadline (1922) - Aaron Kidder
- The Barnstormer (1922) - Leading Man
- Flesh and Blood (1922) - The Policeman
- Paid Back (1922) - Ship Captain
- The Kentucky Derby (1922) - Capt. Wolff
- Barriers of Folly (1922) - Wallace Clifton
- Heroes of the Street (1922)
- Jazzmania (1923) - Julius Furman
- Can a Woman Love Twice? (1923) - Franklyn Chase
- The Girl of the Golden West (1923) - Ashby
- The Greatest Menace (1923) - Charles W. Wright
- Trilby (1923) - The Laird
- Why Women Remarry (1923) - Mr. Compton
- Innocence (1923) - Collingwood
- The Mask of Lopez (1924) - Richard O'Neil
- North of Nevada (1924) - C. Hanaford
- Dorothy Vernon of Haddon Hall (1924) - Earl of Rutland
- Daughters of Pleasure (1924) - Mark Hadley
- The Valley of Hate (1924) - Old Jim Darley
- The Fighting Sap (1924) - Charles Richmond
- Girls Men Forget (1924) - Michael Shayne
- Passion's Pathway (1924) - Richard Stanton
- Cornered (1924) - Updike
- A Fight for Honor (1924) - Tom Grady
- Racing for Life (1924) - Hudford
- The Fatal Mistake (1924)
- Women First (1924)
- The Price She Paid (1924) - James Presbury
- Lightning Romance (1924) - Richard Wade
- On Probation (1924) - Detective Reilly
- The Beautiful Sinner (1924, writer)
- Easy Money (1925)
- As No Man Has Loved (1925) - Maj. Bissell
- Riders of the Purple Sage (1925) - Oldring
- A Broadway Butterfly (1925) - Stage Manager
- The Snob Buster (1925) - John Pendergast
- How Baxter Butted In (1925) - R.S. Falk
- Youth's Gamble (1925) - Harry Blaine
- The Bad Lands (1925) - Col. Owen
- The Wife Who Wasn't Wanted (1925) - Judge Bledsoe
- Was It Bigamy? (1925) - Attorney
- Cyclone Cavalier (1925) - Hugh Clayton
- Her Sacrifice (1926) - Edwin Ramsey
- The Sorrows of Satan (1926) - Minister (uncredited)
- The Nest (1927) - Howard Hardy
- Burnt Fingers (1927) - Lord Cumberly
- Hello Sister (1930) - Dr. Saltus
- Cock o' the Walk (1930) - Señor Vallejo
- Those Who Dance (1930) - Big Ben Benson
- The Arizona Kid (1930) - Manager
- Madam Satan (1930) - Roman Senator (uncredited)
- Just Imagine (1930) - X-10
- Millie (1931) - Millie's Elderly Escort (uncredited)
- Dishonored (1931) - Gen. Dymov (uncredited)
- Men Call It Love (1931) - Sam Ellery (uncredited)
- Cracked Nuts (1931) - Minister (uncredited)
- Young Donovan's Kid (1931) - Duryea
- Politics (1931) - Edgar - a Husband (uncredited)
- The Homicide Squad (1931)
- Caught (1931) - Cavalryman (uncredited)
- Pardon Us (1931) - Warden
- The Galloping Ghost (1931, Serial) - Sportscaster [Chs. 1, 12]
- Graft (1931) - Candidate Louis (uncredited)
- The Age for Love (1931) - Minor Role (uncredited)
- The Phantom (1931) - Dist. Atty. John Hampton
- Convicted (1931) - Capt. Hammond
- Rich Man's Folly (1931)
- His Woman (1931) - (uncredited)
- Cross-Examination (1932) - Judge William J. Hollister
- Careless Lady (1932) - Ship's Purser (uncredited)
- The Midnight Patrol (1932)
- The Silver Lining (1932) - Yacht Captain (uncredited)
- The Tenderfoot(1932) - Patterson (uncredited)
- Week-End Marriage (1932) - Mr. Jackson (uncredited)
- The Dark Horse (1932) - Debate Chairman (uncredited)
- What Price Hollywood? (1932) - Bill - Replacement Director (uncredited)
- Stranger in Town (1932) - J.P. Walker (uncredited)
- Devil and the Deep (1932) - Court Martial Judge (uncredited)
- Two Against the World (1932) - Jury Foreman (uncredited)
- Big City Blues (1932) - Policeman (uncredited)
- The Devil Horse (1932, Serial) - Whitney [Ch. 1] (uncredited)
- You Said a Mouthful (1932) - Official (uncredited)
- Call Her Savage (1932) - Child Welfare Official (uncredited)
- No More Orchids (1932) - Banker (uncredited)
- The Unwritten Law (1932) - Captain Kane
- The Sign of the Cross (1932) - (uncredited)
- Silver Dollar (1932) - Political Crony (uncredited)
- Lucky Larrigan (1932) - John Larrigan
- The Secrets of Wu Sin (1932) - Pharmacist (uncredited)
- Lawyer Man (1932) - Second Jury Foreman (uncredited)
- Sister to Judas (1932) - Mike O'Flanagan
- Phantom Thunderbolt (1933) - Eaton - Railroad President
- The Intruder (1933) - Mr. Wayne
- The Three Musketeers (1933, Serial) - El Shaitan (uncredited)
- The Big Cage (1933) - Bob Mills
- The Devil's Brother (1933) - Alessandro
- I Cover the Waterfront (1933) - Randall
- The Sphinx (1933) - Prosecuting Attorney (uncredited)
- Strange People (1933) - John Davis
- The Mayor of Hell (1933) - Bill (uncredited)
- Midnight Mary (1933) - Nightclub Bouncer (uncredited)
- Her Bodyguard (1933) - Doorman (uncredited)
- Mary Stevens, M.D. (1933) - Barry - Andrews' Lawyer (uncredited)
- Notorious But Nice (1933) - Judge
- Turn Back the Clock (1933) - 1921 Spokesman (uncredited)
- Day of Reckoning (1933) - Guard
- From Headquarters (1933) - Intake Officer (uncredited)
- Blood Money (1933) - Prison Guard (uncredited)
- Advice to the Lovelorn (1933) - Reporter (uncredited)
- The House on 56th Street (1933) - Prosecuting Attorney (uncredited)
- Gallant Lady (1933) - Phelps - the Butler (uncredited)
- The Moth (1934) - John Gale
- The House of Rothschild (1934) - Page (uncredited)
- The Lost Jungle (1934, Serial) - Circus Ring Announcer [Ch. 1]
- Upper World (1934) - Boat Captain (uncredited)
- Operator 13 (1934) - Judge (uncredited)
- Madame Du Barry (1934) - Servant on Lawn Keeping Score (uncredited)
- Murder in the Private Car (1934) - Conductor Thrown from Train (uncredited)
- The Count of Monte Cristo (1934) - Detective (uncredited)
- The Dragon Murder Case (1934) - Police Sergeant (uncredited)
- Peck's Bad Boy (1934) - (uncredited)
- One Night of Love (1934) - Metropolitan Operagoer (uncredited)
- The Return of Chandu (1934, Serial) - Capt. Wilson [Chs. 4-12]
- Cleopatra (1934) - Roman Greeting Antony (uncredited)
- Transatlantic Merry-Go-Round (1934) - Policeman at Dock (uncredited)
- The St. Louis Kid (1934) - Policeman (scenes deleted)
- Love Time (1934) - Dignitary (uncredited)
- The Firebird (1934) - Actor (uncredited)
- Shrimps for a Day (1934, Short) - Mr. Wade, the sponsor
- The Secret Bride (1934) - Bailiff (uncredited)
- Charlie Chan in Paris (1935) - Doorman (uncredited)
- Naughty Marietta (1935) - Announcer (uncredited)
- Les Misérables (1935) - Onlooker (uncredited)
- Vagabond Lady (1935) - Dock Official (uncredited)
- Alibi Ike (1935) - Umpire (uncredited)
- Stranded (1935) - Pat, a Welfare Worker (uncredited)
- The Arizonian (1935) - Townsman with Mayor (uncredited)
- Love Me Forever (1935) - Minor Role (uncredited)
- The Adventures of Rex and Rinty (1935, Serial) - Frank Hammond [Ch. 5] (uncredited)
- Navy Wife (1935) - Pedestrian (uncredited)
- The Public Menace (1935) - Gazette Editor (scenes deleted)
- Stormy (1935) - Mack's Horse Trainer (uncredited)
- Rip Roaring Riley (1935) - Police Chief
- I Found Stella Parish (1935) - Customs Official (uncredited)
- Another Face (1935) - Mr. Jerome - Screenwriter (uncredited)
- Frisco Kid (1935) - First Policeman (uncredited)
- Kind Lady (1935) - First Scotland Yard Man (uncredited)
- Show Them No Mercy! (1935) - Druggist (uncredited)
- Angkor (1935) - Himself, game hunter
- The Lady Consents (1936) - Dr. Rand (uncredited)
- Modern Times (1936) - the Juvenile Officer
- The Prisoner of Shark Island (1936) - Testifying Colonel (uncredited)
- The Story of Louis Pasteur (1936) - Reporter (uncredited)
- The Preview Murder Mystery (1936) - Director (uncredited)
- Love on a Bet (1936) - Man at Hutchinson's Meeting (uncredited)
- The Country Doctor (1936) - Proprietor (uncredited)
- The King Steps Out (1936) - Driver, Von Kempen Carriage (uncredited)
- Human Cargo (1936) - Police Chief
- Hearts Divided (1936) - Footman Announcing Guests (uncredited)
- The White Angel (1936) - Raglan Staff Officer (uncredited)
- High Tension (1936) - Businessman (uncredited)
- The Devil-Doll (1936) - Off-Screen Voice (voice, uncredited)
- Mary of Scotland (1936) - Lexington
- Dimples (1936) - Creditor (uncredited)
- The Charge of the Light Brigade (1936) - Captain (uncredited)
- California Mail (1936) - Sheriff
- Beloved Enemy (1936) - First Doctor (uncredited)
- Counterfeit Lady (1936) - Jailer (uncredited)
- Chatterbox (1936) - Himself (uncredited)
- We Who Are About to Die (1937) - Prison Yard Captain (uncredited)
- Black Legion (1937) - Bailiff (uncredited)
- Criminal Lawyer (1937) - Brandon's Assistant
- Don't Tell the Wife (1937) - Albert - Prison Guard (uncredited)
- Sea Devils (1937) - Coast Guard Officer (uncredited)
- Dick Tracy (1937, Serial) - Mr. Vance (uncredited)
- Circus Girl (1937) - Doctor (uncredited)
- Land Beyond the Law (1937) - Rancher Jim Blake (uncredited)
- Racketeers in Exile (1937) - Finance Man (uncredited)
- Motor Madness (1937) - Police Captain (uncredited)
- Mile-a-Minute-Love (1937) - John T. Drexel
- Marked Woman (1937) - 1st Jury Foreman (uncredited)
- I Promise to Pay (1937) - Police Sergeant (uncredited)
- Blazing Sixes (1937) - Sheriff Tom
- You Can't Beat Love (1937) - Announcer Introducing Jimmy (uncredited)
- Empty Holsters (1937) - John Ware
- Talent Scout (1937) - Director of Screen Test (uncredited)
- Varsity Show (1937) - Police Commissioner (uncredited)
- Prairie Thunder (1937) - Nate Temple
- Hot Water (1937) - Customer in Drugstore (uncredited)
- Idol of the Crowds (1937) - Doctor (uncredited)
- Life Begins with Love (1937) - School Board Director (uncredited)
- Conquest (1937) - Major Domo (uncredited)
- The Westland Case (1937) - Gun Dealer (uncredited)
- The Perfect Specimen (1937) - Deputy Sheriff (uncredited)
- Navy Blue and Gold (1937) - Ship's Captain (uncredited)
- Checkers (1937) - Race Judge (uncredited)
- Missing Witnesses (1937) - Judge in Wagner Case (uncredited)
- She Loved a Fireman (1937) - Fire Tug Captain (uncredited)
- Sergeant Murphy (1938) - Mule Boat Captain (uncredited)
- Daredevil Drivers (1938) - Race Judge (uncredited)
- The Baroness and the Butler (1938) - Member of Parliament
- Night Spot (1938) - Police Lieutenant (uncredited)
- Over the Wall (1938) - Cell Block Keeper (uncredited)
- This Marriage Business (1938) - Mr. Brown (uncredited)
- Accidents Will Happen (1938) - Bailiff (uncredited)
- Rascals (1938) - Cafe Proprietor (uncredited)
- Safety in Numbers (1938) - Councilman
- Speed to Burn (1938) - Paddock Steward (uncredited)
- Four Daughters (1938) - Doctor (uncredited)
- Freshman Year (1938) - Prof. Ullrich
- Down on the Farm (1938) - Wheeler (uncredited)
- A Man to Remember (1938) - Man at Hospital Dedication (uncredited)
- Brother Rat (1938) - Ballfield Doctor (uncredited)
- Angels with Dirty Faces (1938) - Police Sergeant (uncredited)
- Arizona Legion (1939) - Mr. Fisher - Defense Attorney (uncredited)
- Almost a Gentleman (1939) - Dog Show Director (uncredited)
- Dodge City (1939) - Bartender (uncredited)
- Women in the Wind (1939) - Burbank Official (uncredited)
- Zenobia (1939) - Minor Role (uncredited)
- Racketeers of the Range (1939) - Steve - Cattle Rancher (uncredited)
- 6,000 Enemies (1939) - Deputy (uncredited)
- Each Dawn I Die (1939) - Bailiff (uncredited)
- The Day the Bookies Wept (1939) - Bill, Man Outside Racetrack (uncredited)
- Mr. Smith Goes to Washington (1939) - Pompous Man (uncredited)
- The Marshal of Mesa City (1939) - Marshal Andy Thompson (uncredited)
- Raffles (1939) - Bobby (uncredited)
- Nick Carter, Master Detective (1939) - Police Detective Randall (uncredited)
- Four Wives (1939) - Stationmaster (uncredited)
- A Chump at Oxford (1939) - Dean Williams
- Legion of the Lawless (1940) - East Ivestown Leader (uncredited)
- The Fighting 69th (1940) - Doctor Checking Eyes (uncredited)
- Women Without Names (1940) - Roomer (uncredited)
- Virginia City (1940) - Southerner (uncredited)
- Tear Gas Squad (1940) - Policeman (uncredited)
- Edison, the Man (1940) - Broker (uncredited)
- Waterloo Bridge (1940) - Elderly Huntsman at Estate Dance (uncredited)
- Brother Orchid (1940) - Brother MacDonald
- The Man Who Talked Too Much (1940) - Chaplain #2 (uncredited)
- They Drive by Night (1940) - Bailiff (uncredited)
- Ragtime Cowboy Joe (1940) - Sam Osborne
- Triple Justice (1940) - Constable Herb at Tule Mesa
- A Dispatch from Reuters (1940) - Board Member (uncredited)
- Santa Fe Trail (1940) - Weiner (uncredited)
- Back Street (1941) - Congratulator at Race (uncredited)
- The Sea Wolf (1941) - Helmsman (uncredited) (final film role)
