= Ruth King (actress) =

American silent film actress (1898–1946)

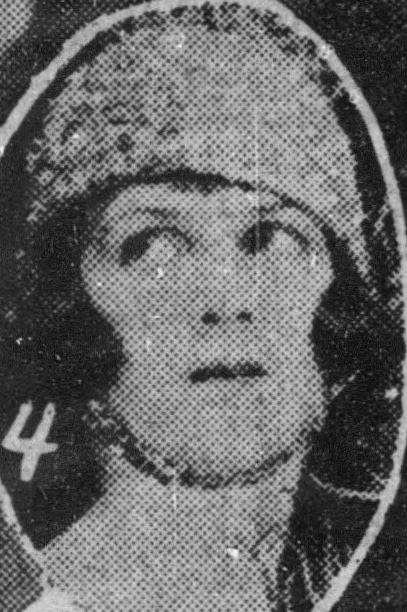
- King in 1925
- Born: September 10, 1898; Sioux City, Iowa, U.S.
- Died: February 27, 1946 (aged 47); Los Angeles, California, U.S.
- Occupation: Actress
- Years active: 1917–1926 (film)
- Spouses: Tom Forman; Ward Hamilton

Ruth King (September 10, 1898 – February 27, 1946) was an American film actress of the silent era. She played a mixture of lead and supporting roles including starring in several Essanay Studios films directed by W.S. Van Dyke.

King was married to actor Tom Forman. They were divorced in 1917. She later married Ward Hamilton.

In 1928, King was sued for $200,000 for alienation of affections. Verda Sherwood charged that her husband, George Sherwood, "had become infatuated with Miss King".

== Selected filmography ==
- The Land of Long Shadows (1917)
- Open Places (1917)
- The Evil Eye (1917)
- The Range Boss (1917)
- The Blood of His Fathers (1917)
- Men of the Desert (1917)
- The Devil's Pass Key (1920)
- Dangerous Love (1920)
- Alias Miss Dodd (1920)
- A Beggar in Purple (1920)
- For the Soul of Rafael (1920)
- Fifty Candles (1921)
- The Cheater Reformed (1921)
- Silent Years (1921)
- A Cafe in Cairo (1924)
- He Who Gets Slapped (1924)
- The Dixie Handicap (1924)
- Scandal Proof (1925)
- The Lady from Hell (1926)
- Driftin' Thru (1926)

== Bibliography ==
- Goble, Alan. The Complete Index to Literary Sources in Film. Walter de Gruyter, 1999.
