= A Cafe in Cairo =

1924 film by Chester Withey

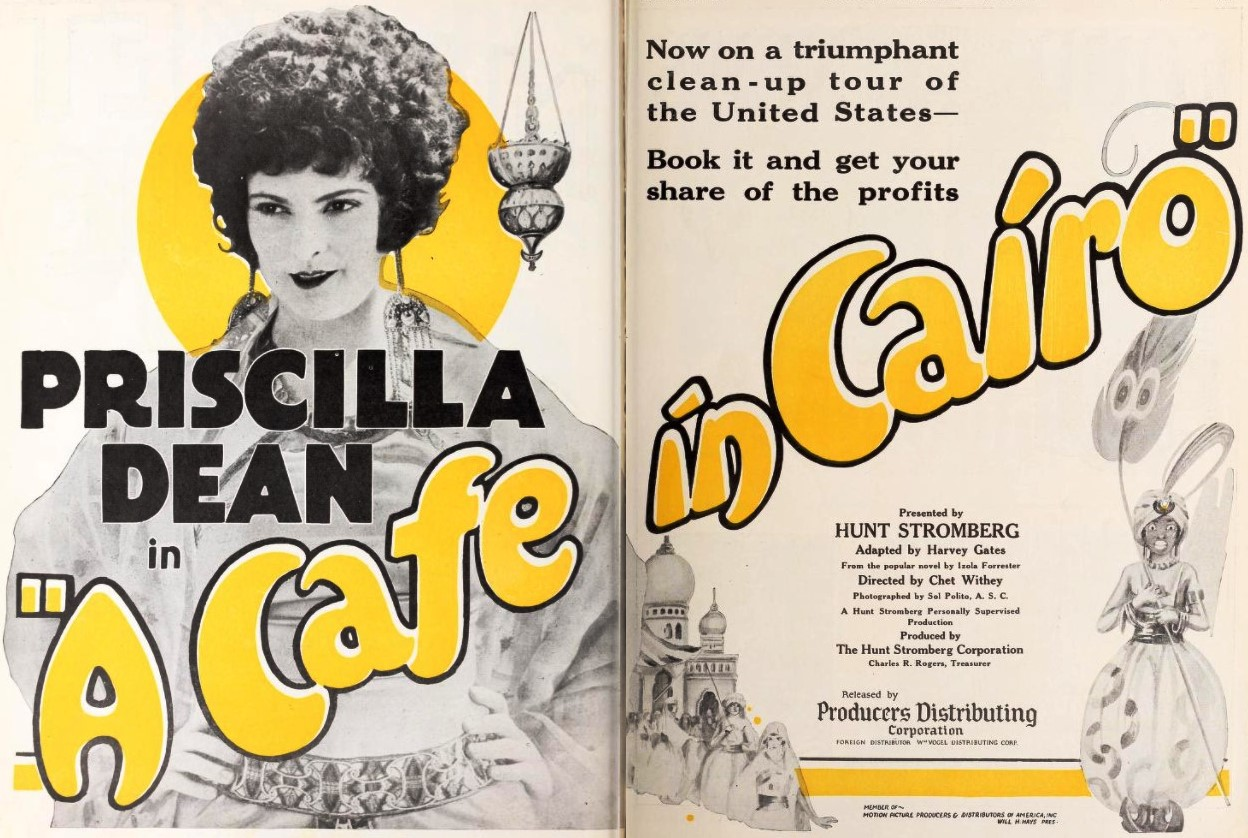
- Advertisement
- Directed by: Chester Withey
- Written by: Izola Forrester; Harvey Gates
- Produced by: Hunt Stromberg; Charles R. Rogers
- Starring: Priscilla Dean; Robert Ellis; Carl Stockdale
- Cinematography: Sol Polito
- Edited by: Harry L. Decker
- Production company: Hunt Stromberg Productions
- Distributed by: Producers Distributing Corporation
- Release date: December 7, 1924
- Running time: 60 minutes; 6 reels (5,656 feet)
- Country: United States
- Languages: Silent (English intertitles)

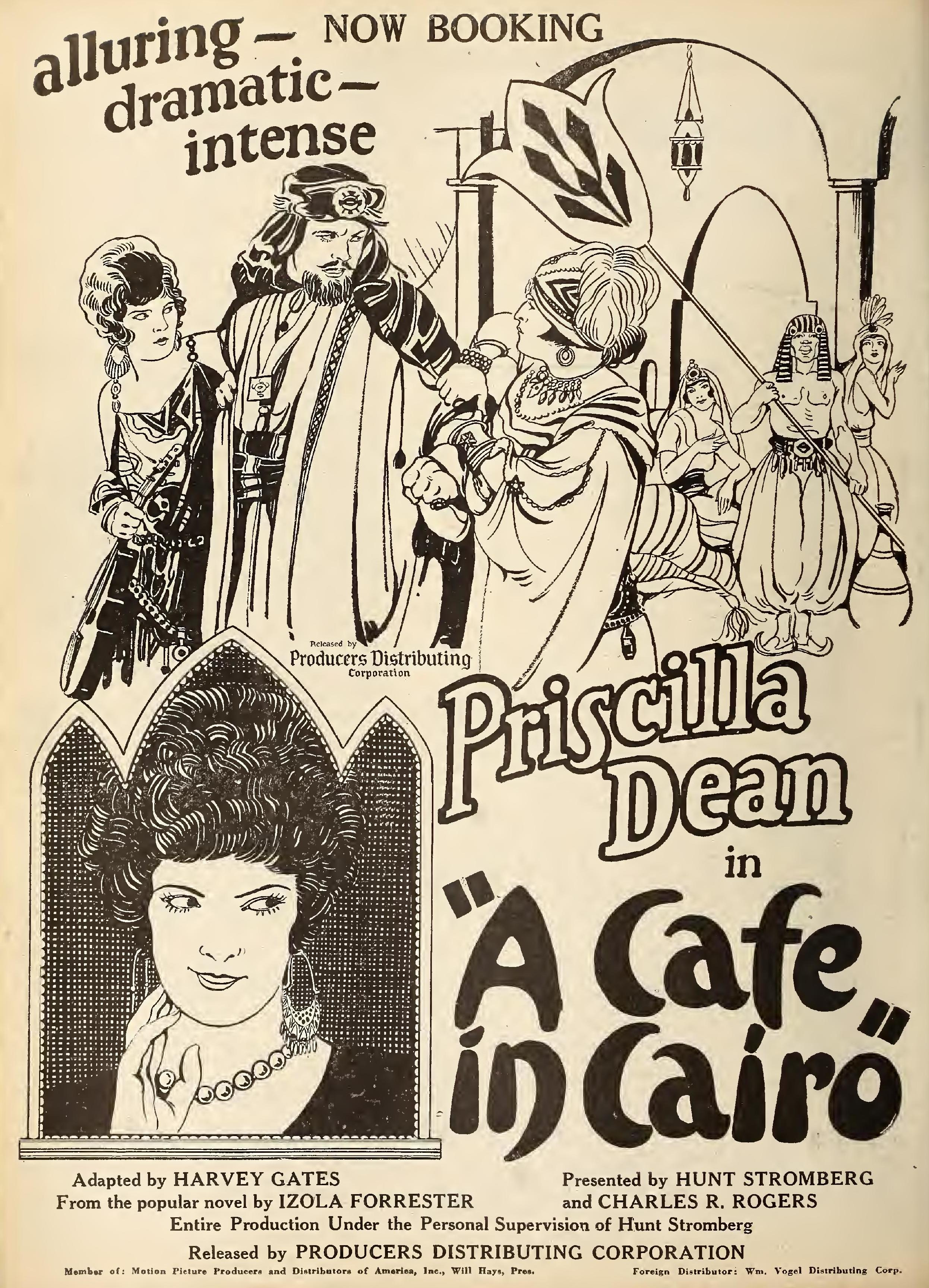
A Cafe in Cairo ad in Exhibitor's Trade Review (Nov 1924-Feb 1925)

A Cafe in Cairo is a 1924 American silent drama film directed by Chester Withey and starring Priscilla Dean, Robert Ellis and Carl Stockdale. Hunt Stromberg produced it for release by the recently established Producers Distributing Corporation. It was part of a wave of films with Middle Eastern settings which followed on from the success of Paramount's The Sheik in 1921.

== Synopsis ==
When her British parents are killed when an Arabian desert bandit launches an attack on their encampment, their young daughter is spared and brought up as an Arab known as Nadia. The bandit who killed Nadia's parents wishes to marry her. She is ordered to steal some documents from a British secret service agent but falls in love with him, and refuses to help the bandit. He threatens to throw both her and her lover into the Nile, before he is killed. Nadia and her lover return to England.

== Cast ==
- Priscilla Dean as Naida
- Robert Ellis as Barry Braxton
- Carl Stockdale as Jaradi
- Evelyn Selbie as Batooka
- Harry Woods as Kali
- John Steppling as Tom Hays
- Marie Crisp as Rosamond
- Carmen Phillips as Gaza
- Larry Steers as Colonel Alastair-Ker
- Ruth King as Evelyn
- Vincente Orona as Sadek

== Preservation ==
With no prints of A Cafe in Cairo located in any film archives, it is a lost film.
