= Al Jennings =

American lawyer and actor (1863–1961)

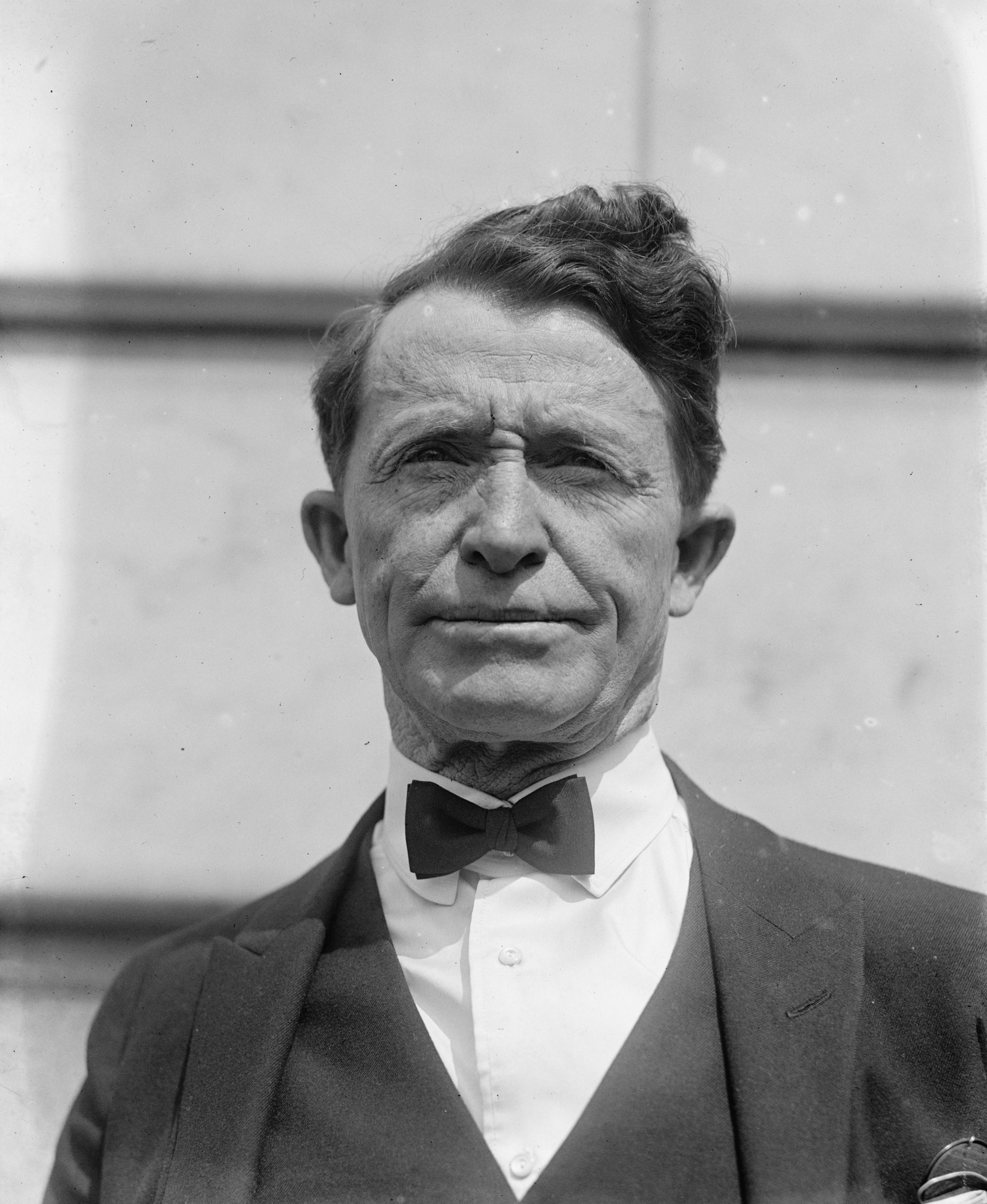
Jennings in 1924

Alphonso J. "Al" Jennings (November 25, 1863 – December 26, 1961) was an attorney in Oklahoma Territory who at one time robbed trains. He later became a silent film star and made many appearances in films as an actor and technical adviser.

== Biography ==
Jennings settled in El Reno, Oklahoma Territory, and served as Canadian County, Oklahoma, prosecuting attorney from 1892 until 1894. In 1895 he joined his brothers, Ed and John, in a law practice at Woodward. In October of that year Ed Jennings was killed, and John Jennings wounded, in a shootout with rival attorney Temple Lea Houston.

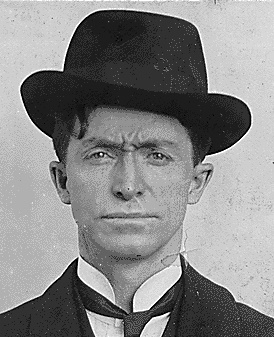
Al Jennings Leavenworth mugshot in 1902

Jennings left Woodward following Houston's acquittal in 1896 and wandered before gaining employment as a ranch hand in the Creek Nation. While working near present Bixby in Creek County, Jennings joined an outlaw band. The justice system's failures enraged him and encouraged him to resist it. During the summer and fall of 1897 the desperados, often referred to as the "Jennings Gang," composed of Frank and Al Jennings, Little Dick West, and Morris and Pat O'Malley, robbed trains, general stores and a post office, with little monetary success. Two of his most publicized robberies were the August 16, 1897, robbery of a Santa Fe passenger train located three miles south of Edmond, Oklahoma and the October 1897 robbery of a passenger train near Chickasha, Oklahoma. When attempting the Edmond robbery, the gang unsuccessfully attempted to break into a Wells-Fargo safe. After the dynamite failed to blow up the safe, the gang made their getaway. No one was killed during this robbery, but Jim Wright, a passenger who refused to surrender his valuables, had part of his ear shot off. The Chickasha robbery was not significantly more successful. Although the gang was unable to break the safe, they were able to obtain some goods from the passengers, including a bottle of whiskey and a bunch of bananas. The gang's most successful robbery was the Berwyn train robbery, which occurred a few miles north of the Texas border. This robbery allowed the gang to obtain thirty thousand dollars' worth of loot. These robberies are the only crimes that historians agree the gang committed. In his semi-autobiographical novel Jennings himself remembered that the law often accused him of various crimes that he did not commit. One of these dubious allegations was that he murdered two men in Denison, Texas. When committing robberies, Jennings followed his personal code of honor. He refused to rob from women or preachers. When he was not robbing, he spent much of his time hiding from the law in Snake Creek in the Creek Nation. Eventually, he became unable to retain his outlaw lifestyle. Jennings was wounded by law officers on November 30, 1897, and captured one week later on Carr Creek near Onapa in McIntosh County, Oklahoma. In 1899 Jennings was sentenced to life in prison, but, due to the legal efforts of his brother John, his sentence was reduced to five years. He was freed on technicalities in 1902 and received a presidential pardon in 1904 by President Theodore Roosevelt. Then in 1906, he married Maude Jennings.

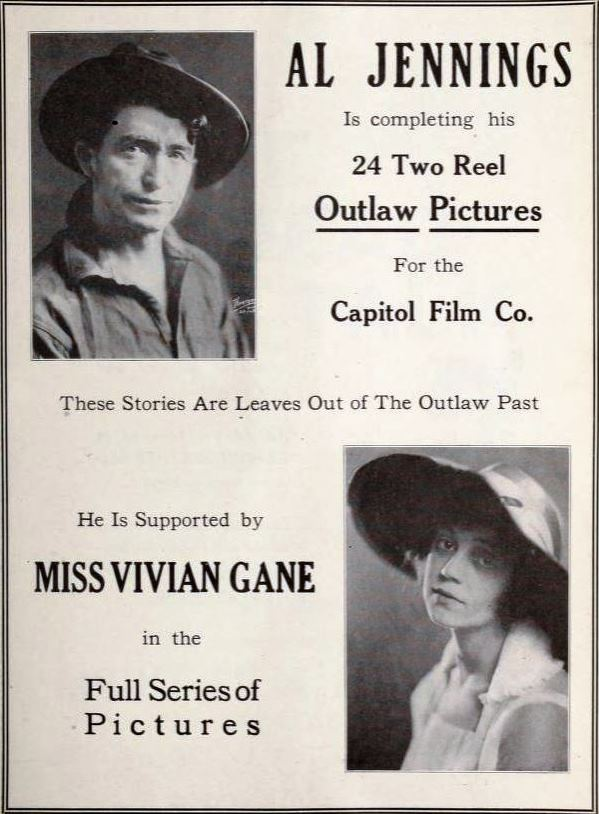
Advertisement for films starring Al Jennings and Vivian Gane, on January 3, 1920. They made three western short films together, The Tryout (1919), A Fugitive's Life (1919), and The Frame-Up (1919).

Jennings became a celebrity. In 1904 William Sydney Porter, better known as O. Henry, published the short story "Holding Up a Train," a story inspired by Jennings's career. Jennings himself was the actual author of this story. Henry and Jennings met while both were hiding in Honduras, which did not have an extradition treaty with the US. In 1913 Jennings wrote Beating Back, a novel loosely based on his outlaw life. This novel portrayed the law as persecutors of the innocent and Jennings as an honorable lawbreaker who possessed immense skills in horsemanship and marksmanship. To coincide with this novel, The Saturday Evening Post wrote a series of interviews with Jennings that perpetuated the same messages as his novel. He re-created one of his bank robberies in the 1908 film The Bank Robbery. In this film, Heck Thomas assembled a posse, chased and captured the bank robbers. Bill Tilghman was the director, James Bennie Kent was the cinema-photographer, and the Oklahoma Natural Mutoscene Company was the producer. The film was shot in Cache, Oklahoma, and at the Wichita Mountains Wildlife Refuge, with Quanah Parker having a bit part. A bystander thought that the bank was really being robbed and jumped out a window to run for the police. Jennings made several public appearances and told various stories of his alleged prowess with a gun. Supposedly, he could shoot a tin can thrown through the air. His personal friends claimed that Al Jennings actually could not hit the side of a barn.

Jennings moved to Oklahoma City in 1911 and became active in politics. In 1912 he won the Democratic nomination for Oklahoma County attorney, but he lost the general election. In 1914 he made an unsuccessful run for the office of governor of Oklahoma. Enjoying the popularity of his starring role in the 1914 film adaptation of his 1913 biography, Beating Back, Jennings campaigned openly about his past and won votes with his honesty. One of six Democratic candidates, he finished third in the primary behind James B. A. Robertson and Robert L. Williams.

Jennings wrote another book, Through the Shadows With O. Henry, which was published in 1921 by NY Burt. It details his friendship with the short story writer, then known only as William Sydney Porter, from a few years before they were sent to the Ohio State Penitentiary (on charges arising from separate incidents), until sometime after their release from prison within a few years of each other, and a subsequent meeting in New York.

Retiring from law and politics, Jennings moved to California and worked in the motion picture industry making Westerns, appearing in many as an actor and also as a technical adviser. A film biography of him was made in 1951, Al Jennings of Oklahoma, with Dan Duryea in the title role. Jennings also worked as a traveling evangelist and warned the public against making the choices that he made. He died in Tarzana, California, on December 26, 1961, aged 98. He is interred in the Oakwood Memorial Park Cemetery in Chatsworth, California.

=== Bibliography ===
As author:

- Beating Back (1913)
- Through the Shadows With O. Henry (1921)

=== Films ===
- Beating Back (1914)
- Captain of the Gray Horse Troop (1917)
- Vengeance – and the Woman (1917)
- The Lady of the Dugout (1918)
- The Fugitive's life(1919)
- Fighting Fury (1924)
- The Demon (1926)
- Loco Luck (1927)
- The Land of Missing Men (1930)
- Song of the Gringo (1936)
- The Oklahoma Kid (1939)

== See also ==
- List of people pardoned or granted clemency by the president of the United States
