= Fifty Candles =

1921 silent film

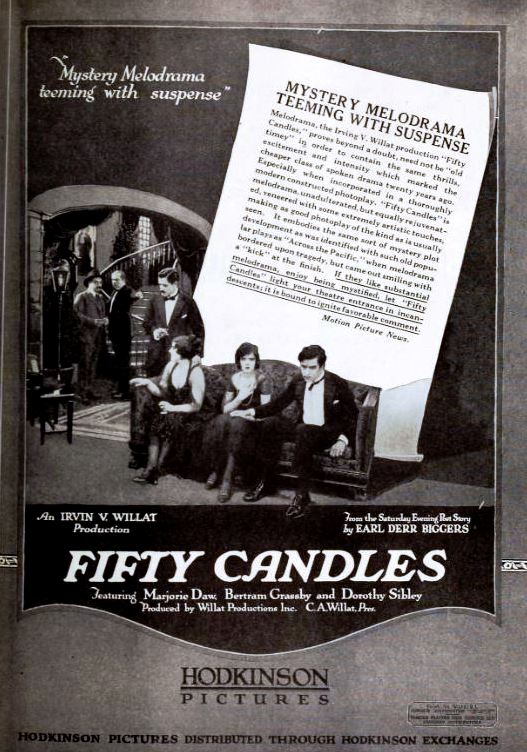
- Directed by: Irvin Willat
- Written by: Earl Derr Biggers (novel)
- Starring: Bertram Grassby; Marjorie Daw; Ruth King
- Production company: Irvin V. Willat Productions
- Distributed by: Hodkinson Pictures
- Release date: December 11, 1921
- Running time: 60 minutes
- Country: United States
- Languages: Silent; English intertitles

Fifty Candles is a 1921 American silent mystery film directed by Irvin Willat and starring Bertram Grassby, Marjorie Daw and Ruth King.

== Cast ==
- Bertram Grassby as Hung Chin Chung
- Marjorie Daw as Mary-Will Tellfair
- Ruth King as Carlotta Drew
- Wade Boteler as Mark Drew
- William A. Carroll as Henry Drew
- George Webb as Dr. Parker
- Dorothy Sibley as Mah Li
- Edmund Burns as Ralph Coolidge

== Bibliography ==
- Munden, Kenneth White. The American Film Institute Catalog of Motion Pictures Produced in the United States, Part 1. University of California Press, 1997.
