= Open Places =

1917 film

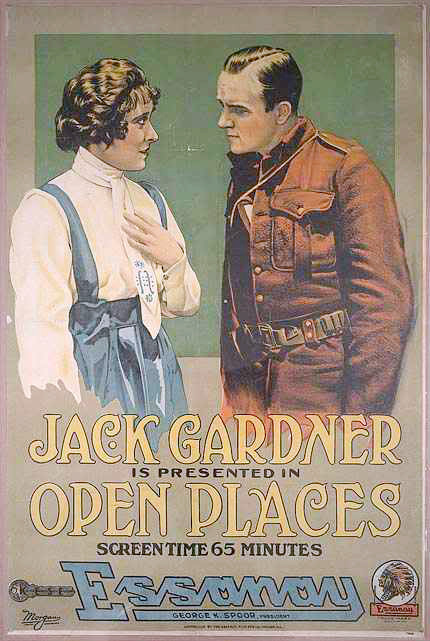
- Directed by: W. S. Van Dyke
- Written by: W. S. Van Dyke
- Starring: Jack Gardner; Carl Stockdale; Ruth King
- Production company: Essanay Studios
- Distributed by: K-E-S-E Service
- Release date: August 20, 1917
- Running time: 65 minutes
- Country: United States
- Languages: Silent; English intertitles

Open Places is a 1917 American silent Western film directed by W. S. Van Dyke and starring Jack Gardner, Carl Stockdale and Ruth King.

== Cast ==
- Jack Gardner as Constable Calhoun
- Carl Stockdale as Dan Clark
- Ruth King as Mollie Andrews

== Bibliography ==
- Connelly, Robert B. The Silents: Silent Feature Films, 1910-36, Volume 40, Issue 2. December Press, 1998.
