= Double Adventure =

1921 film

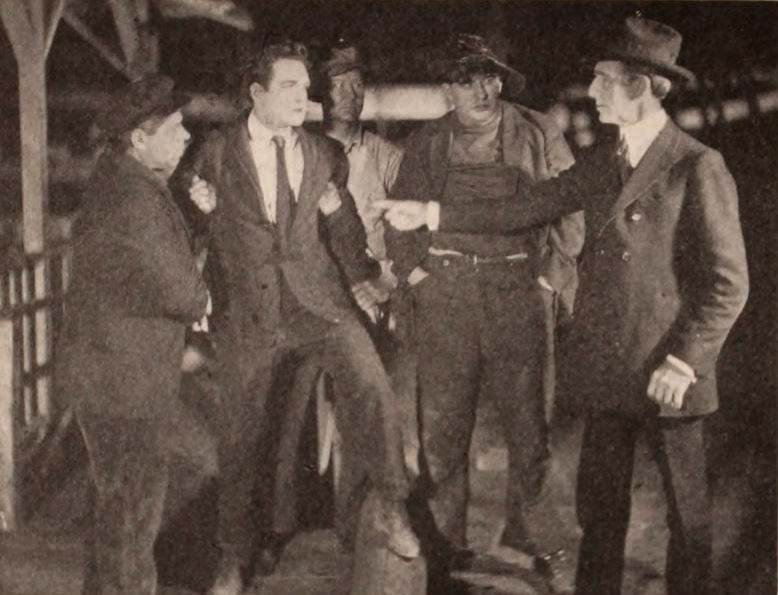
- Film still
- Directed by: W. S. Van Dyke
- Written by: Jack Cunningham
- Starring: Charles Hutchison; Josie Sedgwick
- Distributed by: Pathé Exchange
- Release date: January 23, 1921
- Running time: 15 episodes
- Country: United States
- Language: Silent (English intertitles)

Double Adventure is a 1921 American film serial directed by W. S. Van Dyke. The film is considered to be lost in the United States. All or parts of the serial are held by Gosfilmofond, Russian State Archive.

== Cast ==
- Charles Hutchison as Bob Cross / Dick Biddle
- Josie Sedgwick as Martha Steadman
- Carl Stockdale as Jules Fernol
- S.E. Jennings as Rebel Chief
- Ruth Langdon as Vincente Garcia (credited as Ruth Langston)
- Louis D'Or as President Garcia

== See also ==
- List of American films of 1921
- List of film serials
- List of film serials by studio
