= Two Moons (film) =

1920 film

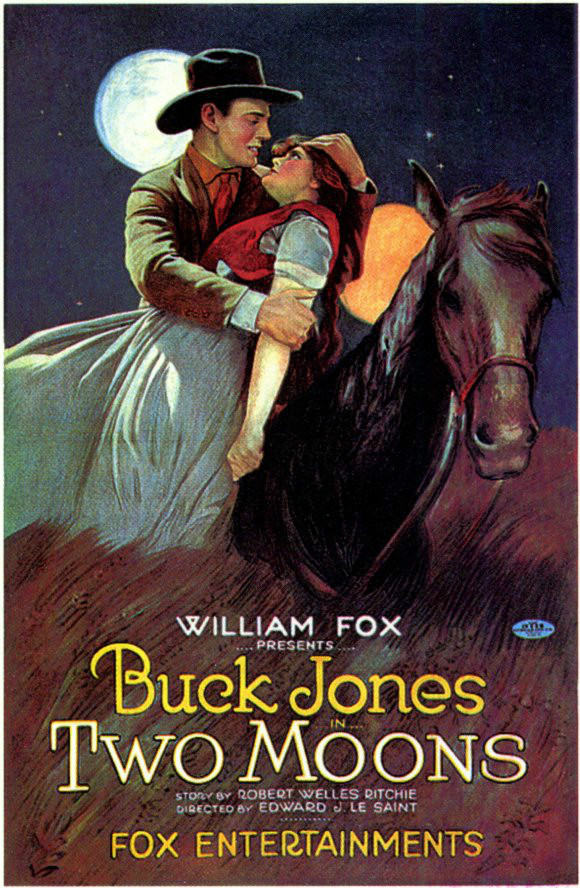
- Theatrical release poster
- Directed by: Edward LeSaint
- Written by: Edward LeSaint (scenario)
- Based on: Trails to Two Moons by Robert Welles Ritchie
- Starring: Buck Jones; Carol Holloway; Bert Sprotte; Edward Peil Sr. Edwin B. Tilton
- Production company: Fox Film Corporation
- Distributed by: Fox Film Corporation
- Release date: December 19, 1920
- Running time: 50 minutes
- Country: United States
- Languages: Silent; English intertitles

Two Moons is a 1920 American silent Western film directed by Edward LeSaint and starring Buck Jones, Carol Holloway, Bert Sprotte, Edward Peil Sr., and Edwin B. Tilton. It is based on the 1920 novel Trails to Two Moons by Robert Welles Ritchie. The film was released by Fox Film Corporation on December 19, 1920.

== Cast ==
- Buck Jones as Bill Blunt
- Carol Holloway as Hilma Ring
- Bert Sprotte as Sheriff Red Agnew
- Edward Peil Sr. as Lang Whistler
- Edwin B. Tilton as Strayhorn
- Gus Saville as Old Man Ring
- Slim Padgett as Rogers
- William Ellingford as Timberline Todd
- Louis Fitzroy as Uncle Alf
- Eunice Murdock Moore as Wooly Ann
- Eleanor Gawne as Phenie
- Jim O'Neill as The Killer
- Billy Fay as Von Tromp
- May Foster as Red Agnew's Wife
- Dick La Reno as The Blacksmith

== Preservation ==
The film is now considered lost.

== See also ==
- List of lost films
- 1937 Fox vault fire
