= The Lady of the Dugout =

1918 film

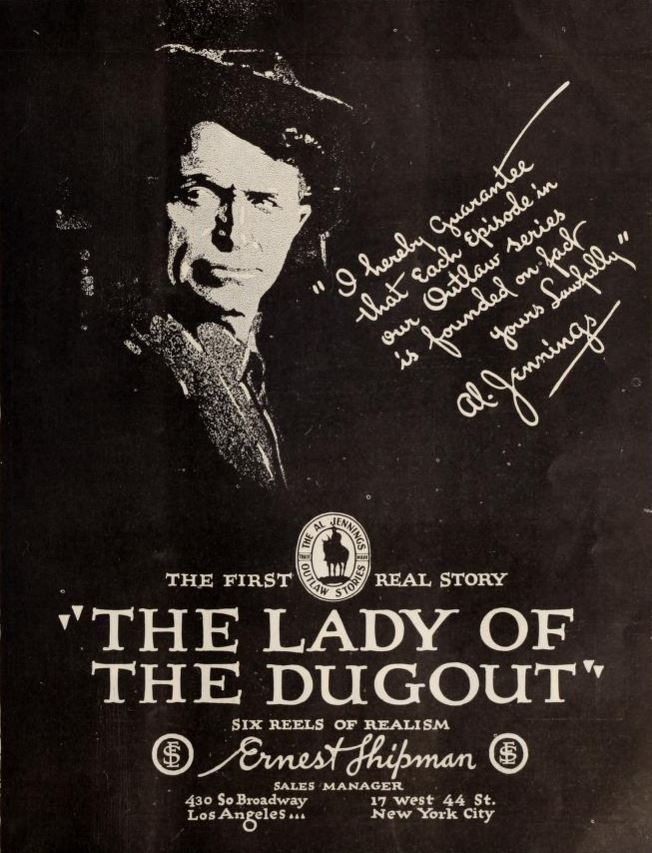
- Directed by: W.S. Van Dyke
- Written by: W. S. Van Dyke
- Produced by: Al J. Jennings
- Starring: Al J. Jennings; Frank Jennings; Corinne Grant
- Cinematography: David Abel
- Production company: Al Jennings Production Company
- Distributed by: Ernest Shipman
- Release date: September 1918
- Running time: 60 minutes
- Country: United States
- Languages: Silent; English intertitles

The Lady of the Dugout is a 1918 American silent Western film directed by W.S. Van Dyke and starring Al J. Jennings, Frank Jennings and Corinne Grant.

== Cast ==
- Al J. Jennings as Al Jennings
- Frank Jennings as Frank Jennings
- Corinne Grant as The Lady
- Ben Alexander as The Lady's Son
- Joseph Singleton as The Lady's Husband
- Carl Stockdale as Zonie, The Killer

== Bibliography ==
- Connelly, Robert B. The Silents: Silent Feature Films, 1910-36, Volume 40, Issue 2. December Press, 1998.
