= The Evil Eye (1917 film) =

1917 film by George Melford

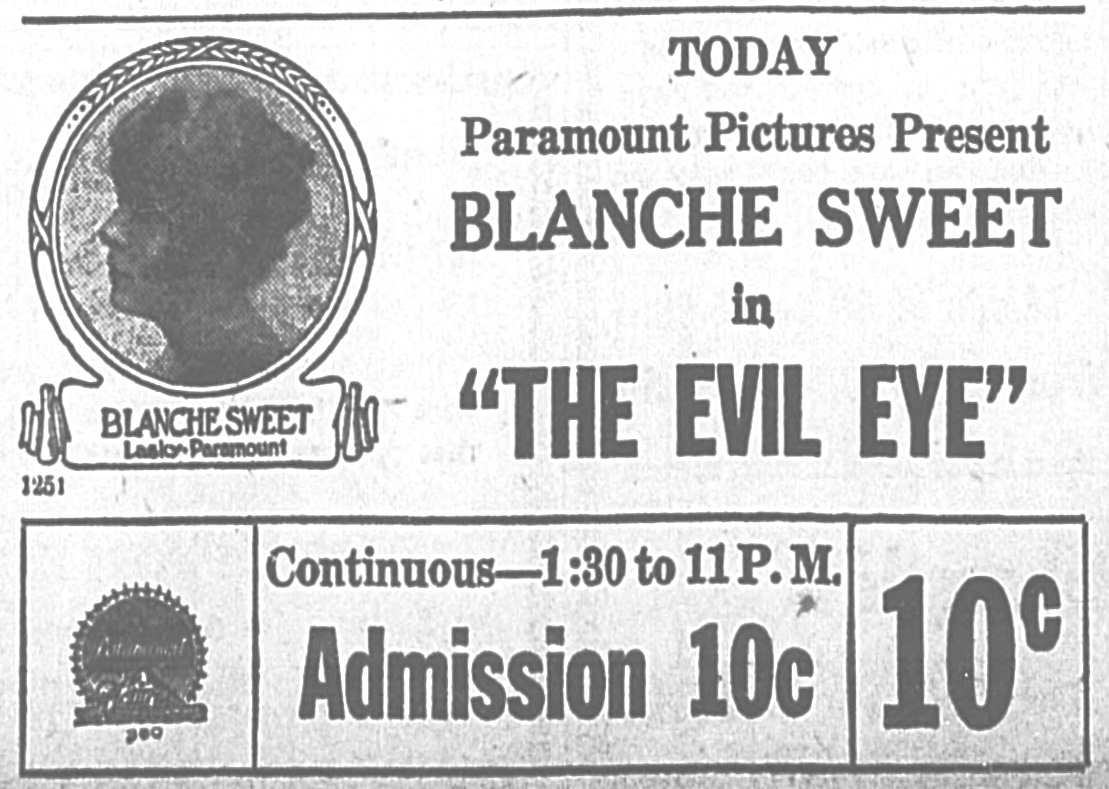
- Newspaper advertisement
- Directed by: George Melford
- Written by: George D. Proctor (scenario)
- Story by: Hector Turnbull (A Woman's Victory)
- Produced by: Jesse L. Lasky
- Cinematography: Percy Hilburn (French)
- Production company: Jesse L. Lasky Feature Play Company
- Distributed by: Paramount Pictures
- Release date: January 4, 1917
- Running time: 5 reels
- Country: United States
- Language: Silent (English intertitles)

The Evil Eye is an extant 1917 American silent drama film produced by Jesse L. Lasky and distributed by Paramount Pictures. It was directed by George Melford and stars Blanche Sweet.

== Cast ==
- Blanche Sweet as Dr. Katherine Torrance
- Tom Forman as Leonard Sheldon
- Webster Campbell as Frank King
- J. Parks Jones as Clifford Sheldon
- Walter Long as Mexican Joe
- Ruth King as Rosa
- William Dale as Michael
- Edythe Chapman

== Preservation ==
A complete 35mm print of The Evil Eye is held by the Library of Congress.
