= Bert Sprotte =

German actor

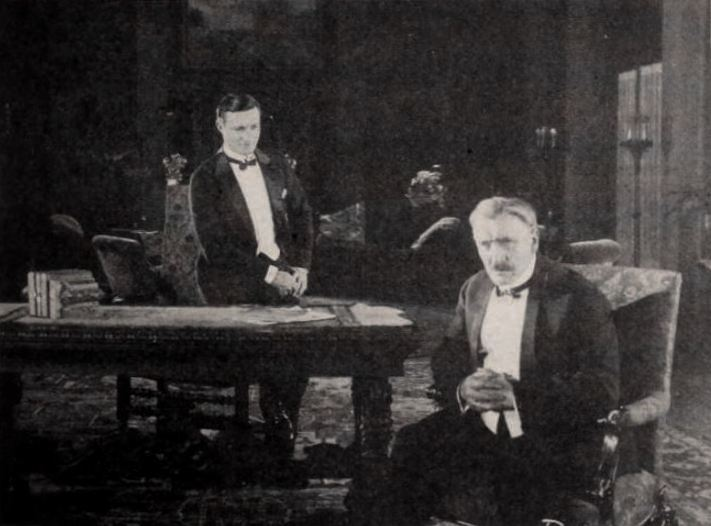
- Tom Mix and Sprotte (right) in Trailin (1921)
- Born: 9 December 1870; Chemnitz, Saxony, Germany
- Died: 30 December 1949 (aged 79); Los Angeles, California, USA
- Occupation: Actor
- Years active: 1918–1938

Bert Sprotte (9 December 1870 – 30 December 1949) was a German actor. He appeared in more than 70 American films between 1918 and 1938. He was born in Chemnitz, Saxony, and died in Los Angeles, California.

== Selected filmography ==
- Selfish Yates (1918)
- The Border Wireless (1918)
- Breed of Men (1919)
- The World Aflame (1919)
- The Shepherd of the Hills (1919)
- Two Moons (1920)
- The Golden Trail (1920)
- Jes' Call Me Jim (1920)
- Below the Deadline (1921)
- The Night Horsemen (1921)
- Guile of Women (1921)
- Trailin' (1921)
- The Blazing Trail (1921)
- For Big Stakes (1922)
- A Question of Honor (1922)
- Conquering the Woman (1922)
- Silver Spurs (1922)
- The Fighting Streak (1922)
- Thelma (1922)
- The Prisoner (1923)
- The Purple Dawn (1923)
- Trimmed in Scarlet (1923)
- Snowdrift (1923)
- The Miracle Baby (1923)
- Soul of the Beast (1923)
- Rosita (1923)
- Wild Bill Hickok (1923)
- Singer Jim McKee (1924)
- Little Robinson Crusoe (1924)
- His Hour (1924)
- Confessions of a Queen (1925)
- The White Desert (1925)
- The Human Tornado (1925)
- Why Women Love (1925)
- Ace of Spades (1925)
- The Lady in Ermine (1927)
- The Stolen Bride (1927)
- Wild Geese (1927)
- Life of an Actress (1927)
- The Fighting Hombre (1927)
- The Private Life of Helen of Troy (1927)
- Pass the Gravy (1928)
- A Royal Romance (1930)
- Demon of the Sea (1931)
- A Passport to Hell (1932)
- Song of the Eagle (1933)
- It Could Happen to You (1937)
