= Al Jennings of Oklahoma =

1951 film

- Theatrical release poster
- Directed by: Ray Nazarro
- Written by: George Bricker; Will Irwin
- Produced by: Rudolph C. Flothow
- Starring: Dan Duryea; Gale Storm; Dick Foran; Gloria Henry; Guinn 'Big Boy' Williams
- Cinematography: W. Howard Greene
- Edited by: Richard Fantl
- Music by: Mischa Bakaleinikoff
- Color process: Technicolor
- Production company: Columbia Pictures
- Distributed by: Columbia Pictures
- Release date: January 17, 1951
- Running time: 79 minutes
- Country: United States
- Language: English

Al Jennings of Oklahoma is a 1951 American Western film directed by Ray Nazarro and starring Dan Duryea and Gale Storm. It is based on the story of Al Jennings, a former train robber turned attorney.

== Plot ==
The rambunctious youngest son of a family of lawyers turns against the justice system after the murder of his brother and becomes the leader of a notorious bandit gang.

== Cast ==
- Dan Duryea as Al Jennings
- Gale Storm as Margo St. Claire
- Dick Foran as Frank Jennings
- Gloria Henry as Alice Calhoun
- Guinn 'Big Boy' Williams as Lon Tuttle
- Raymond Greenleaf as Judge Jennings
- Stanley Andrews as Marshal Ken Slattery
- John Ridgely as Railroad Detective Dan Hanes
- James Millican as Ed Jennings
- Harry Shannon as Fred Salter
- John Dehner as Tom Marsden
- Fred Aldrich as Henchman (uncredited)

== Production ==
The screenplay was written by George Bricker based on a subject by Al J. Jennings and Will Irwin. The film was shot at the Iverson Ranch in the Chatsworth section of Los Angeles from mid-April to late May 1950.

== Bibliography ==
- Paul Varner. The A to Z of Westerns in Cinema. Scarecrow Press, 2009.
