= The Human Tornado (1925 film) =

1925 film

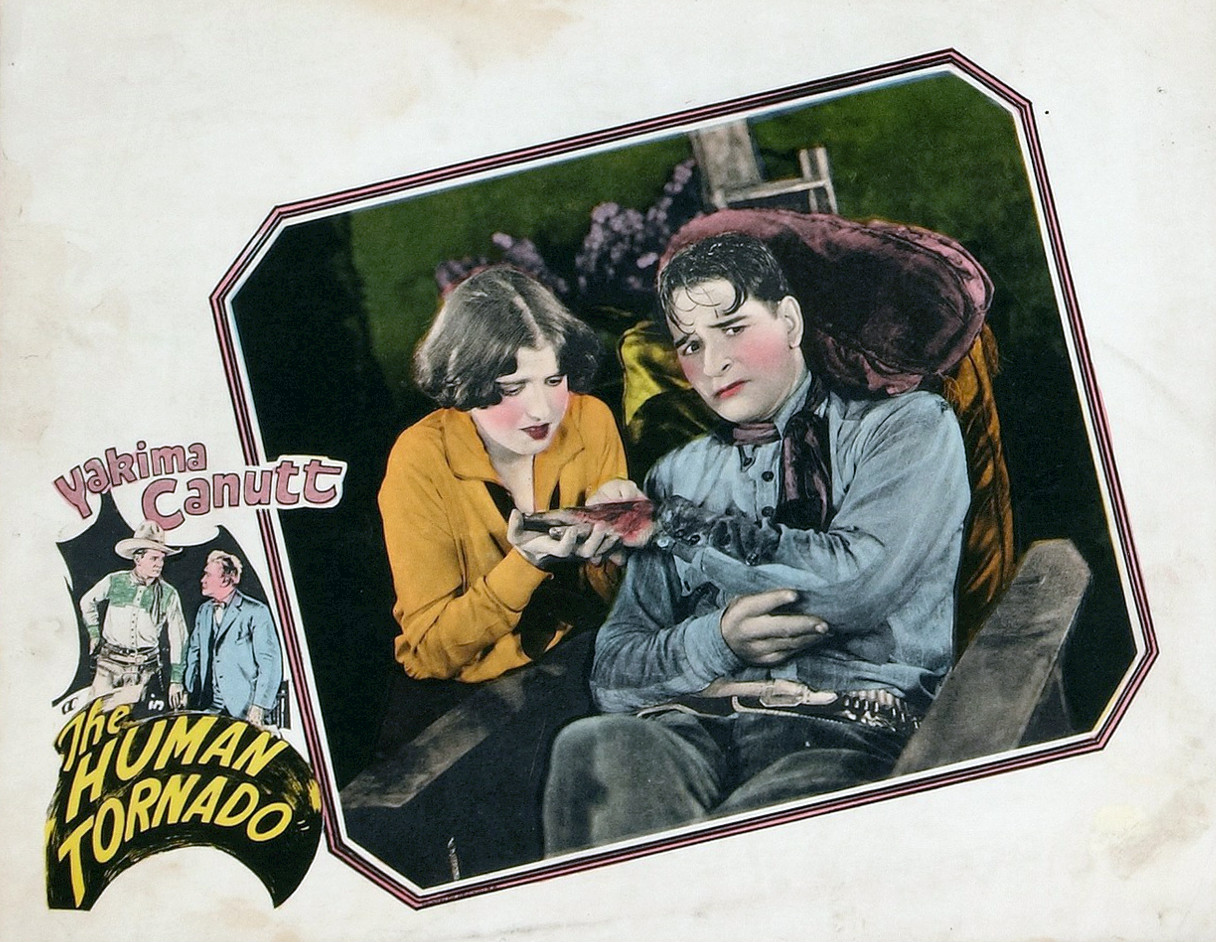
- Directed by: Ben F. Wilson
- Written by: Cliff Hill
- Starring: Yakima Canutt; Bert Sprotte; Lafe McKee
- Cinematography: Lou Breslow; Allen G. Siegler
- Production company: Robertson-Cole Pictures Corporation
- Distributed by: Film Booking Offices of America; Ideal Films (UK)
- Release date: June 21, 1925
- Running time: 50 minutes
- Country: United States
- Language: Silent (English intertitles)

The Human Tornado is a 1925 American silent Western film directed by Ben F. Wilson and starring Yakima Canutt, Bert Sprotte, and Lafe McKee.

== Plot ==
As described in a film magazine review, Chet Marlow comes West to look after his mining interests and treats with contempt his half-brother Jim, a cowboy, who was disinherited by their father. Marion Daley resents Chet's attentions rescue. Under the pretense of advancing her father $100, Chet cheats Peter Daley out of his gold claim. Jim becomes indignant. Peter goes to Chet's office and surprises Tom Crowley, a crook, obtains a box containing the deed and a sum of money, and then goes into hiding. Tom fires his gun at Jim and kills the watchman, and later kills the mail carrier in an attempt to obtain a letter addressed to Marion from her father telling where the money is buried. Jim obtains the letter, but is accused of the murder of the mail carrier while Peter is charged with the murder of the watchman. Jim digs up the money and is chased by Tom Crowley's gang. Tom is shot and confesses to the two murders. Peter's lawyer secures proof that Chet has forged his father's will and that the mine property belongs to Jim. Jim shares his happiness with Marion.

== Cast ==
- Yakima Canutt as Jim Marlow
- Bert Sprotte as Chet Marlow
- Nancy Leeds as Marion Daley
- Lafe McKee as Peter Daley
- Joe Rickson as Tom Crowley
- Slim Allen as Sheriff Cutter

== Bibliography ==
- Connelly, Robert B. The Silents: Silent Feature Films, 1910-36, Volume 40, Issue 2. December Press, 1998.
- Munden, Kenneth White. The American Film Institute Catalog of Motion Pictures Produced in the United States, Part 1. University of California Press, 1997.
