= Jes' Call Me Jim =

1920 film by Clarence G. Badger

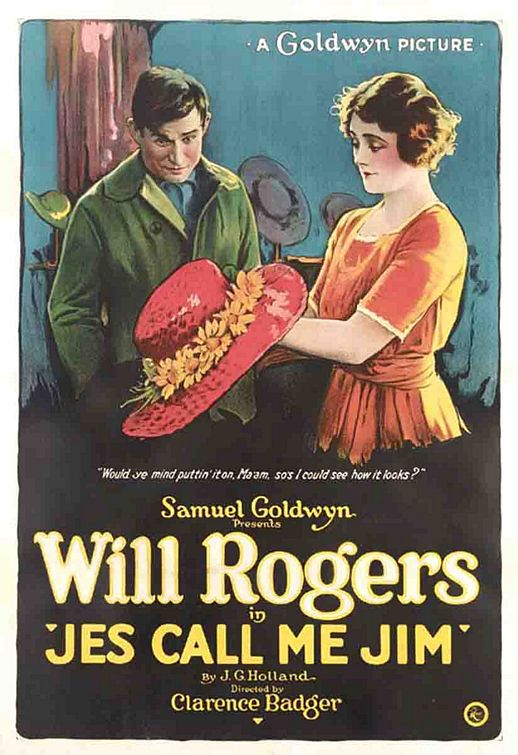
- Theatrical release poster
- Directed by: Clarence G. Badger
- Screenplay by: Edward T. Lowe Jr. Thompson Buchanan
- Based on: Seven Oaks by James G. Holland
- Produced by: Samuel Goldwyn
- Starring: Will Rogers; Irene Rich; Lionel Belmore; Raymond Hatton; Jimmy Rogers; Bert Sprotte
- Cinematography: Marcel Le Picard
- Production company: Goldwyn Pictures
- Distributed by: Goldwyn Pictures
- Release date: May 23, 1920
- Running time: 60 minutes
- Country: United States
- Language: Silent (English intertitles)

Jes' Call Me Jim is a 1920 American silent comedy-drama film directed by Clarence G. Badger and written by Edward T. Lowe Jr. and Thompson Buchanan. It is based on the 1875 novel Sevenoaks by Josiah Gilbert Holland. The film stars Will Rogers, Irene Rich, Lionel Belmore, Raymond Hatton, Jimmy Rogers and Bert Sprotte. The film was released on May 23, 1920, by Goldwyn Pictures.

== Cast ==
- Will Rogers as Jim Fenton
- Irene Rich as Miss Butterworth
- Lionel Belmore as Belcher
- Raymond Hatton as Paul Benedict
- Jimmy Rogers as Harry Benedict
- Bert Sprotte as Buffum
- Nick Cogley as Mike Conlin
- Sidney De Gray as Sam Yates

== Preservation status ==
A copy is preserved in the Museum of Modern Art collection, New York City.
