= Dangerous Love (1920 film) =

1920 film

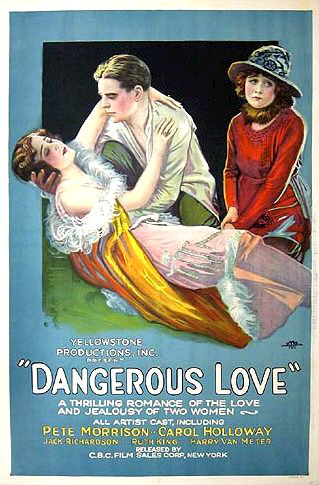
- Movie poster
- Directed by: Charles Bartlett
- Screenplay by: Hal Hoadley
- Based on: Ben Warman (novel); Charles E. Winter
- Starring: Pete Morrison; Carol Holloway; Ruth King; Jack Richardson
- Production company: Yellowstone Productions
- Distributed by: C.B.C. Film Sales Corporation
- Release date: December 1920
- Running time: Five reels
- Country: United States
- Languages: Silent; English intertitles

Dangerous Love is a 1920 American silent Western film based on the 1917 novel Ben Warman by Charles E. Winter, who would later become a congressman for Wyoming. The film was directed by Charles Bartlett, and stars Pete Morrison, Carol Holloway, Ruth King, Jack Richardson, and Spottiswoode Aitken. The movie was shot at the Lakeside Studios in Denver, Colorado. The feature had previously been announced under several titles before its release, including The Vanishing Strain, Ben Warman, A Good Bad Man, and Broken Promises.

== Synopsis ==
Ben Warman, a likable boy with a proclivity for gambling and fighting, alienates the owner of a saloon in a Western mining town by helping a girl remove her drunken father from the premises. In so doing he makes a friend of the Woman, a young school teacher who makes Ben promise to give up his vices. Their romance is endangered, however, by the arrival of an Eastern girl, who takes a fancy to Ben, and her brother, who falls for the schoolteacher. The Easterners see that the teacher gets false reports of the cause of Ben's fights, and the schoolteacher leaves for the East to study music. The saloon owner, enlisting the aid of an adventuress, hatches a plan to defraud Ben of a mine claim, but the school teacher returns in time to foil the scheme and be reunited with Ben.

== Cast ==
- Pete Morrison as Ben Warman
- Carol Holloway as The Woman
- Ruth King as The Other Woman
- Spottiswoode Aitken as The Father
- Harry von Meter as Gerald Lorimer
- William Lion West as Cafe Owner
- Jack Richardson as Half-Breed
- Verne Layton as The Editor
- William Welsh
- Zelma Edwards

== Preservation ==
The film is preserved in the Library of Congress collection.
