= Eyes of the Totem =

1927 film

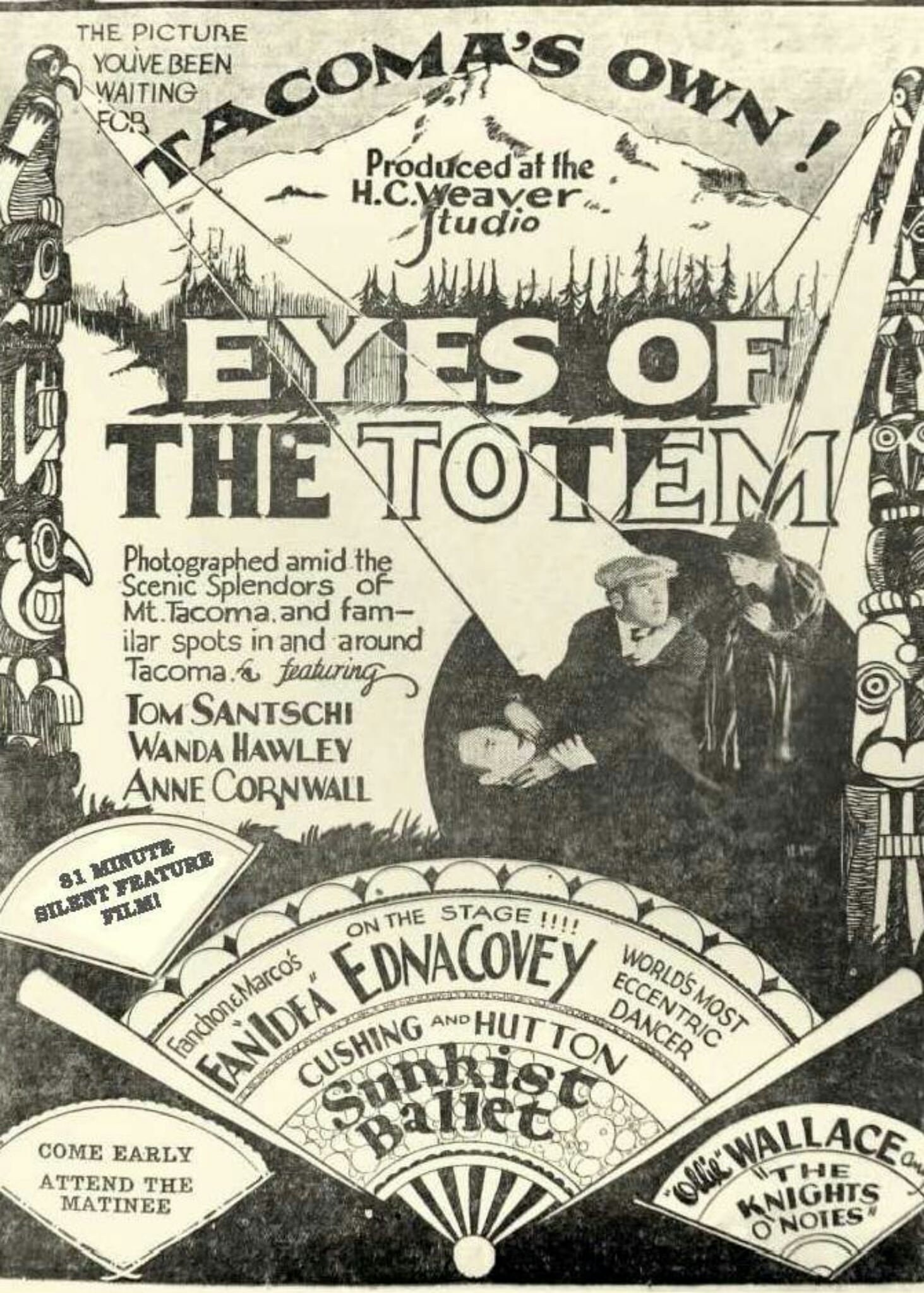
- Directed by: W.S. Van Dyke
- Written by: E. C. Maxwell; W. W. Dickson
- Produced by: H.C. Weaver
- Starring: Wanda Hawley; Tom Santschi
- Cinematography: Abe Scholtz
- Production company: H.C. Weaver Studios
- Distributed by: Pathé Exchange
- Release date: May 15, 1927
- Running time: 7 reels
- Country: United States
- Language: Silent

Full film

Eyes of The Totem is a 1927 silent film directed by W.S. Van Dyke. It was one of three films produced by H.C. Weaver Studios in Tacoma, Washington between 1924-1928. Long considered lost, Eyes of the Totem is the only known surviving film of the three. It was rediscovered in a New York City film vault in 2014. The film re-premiered with a new original score at the Rialto Theatre in Tacoma in September 2015 (the same theater where the producers of the film first watched it in 1926).

The cast included well-known silent movie actors Tom Santschi, Wanda Hawley, and Gareth Hughes. The film was shot on location in and around the city of Tacoma as well as at the 50,000 square foot production stage built by Weaver in the Titlow Beach area. Many local historic sites are featured in the film, including the Winthrop Hotel, Annie Wright School, the Tacoma Totem Pole, and Thornewood Castle.

== Plot ==
Mariam Hardy, young daughter Betty and husband Jim live in a log cabin in the desolate and frozen north, where Jim works their mining claim. Mariam longs for a normal life in the civilized world. Her husband returns one day with cash and the news that he has sold the claim. They board a steamer bound for Tacoma. Upon reaching the city, Jim is murdered and the cash is stolen by a mysterious steely-eyed stranger. Left penniless with a small child to care for, Mariam becomes a beggar. Over the years she becomes a respectable member of society, but she always keeps a watch for the eyes of the murderer. A chance encounter reveals his identity, leading to a violent confrontation.

== Cast ==
Credited cast:

- Wanda Hawley as Mariam Hardy
- Tom Santschi as Philip La Rue
- Anne Cornwall as Betty Hardy
- Gareth Hughes as Bruce Huston
- Bert Woodruff as Toby
- Monte Wax as Jim Hardy
- Violet Palmer as Stella Haynes
- Mary Louise Jones as Mrs. Francis Huston
- Dorothy Llewellyn as Peggy Huston
- Nell Barry Taylor as Bessie Snyder

Uncredited cast:

- Emily Roudebush
- W.S. Van Dyke as the Police Chief
