= The Beautiful Sinner =

1924 film

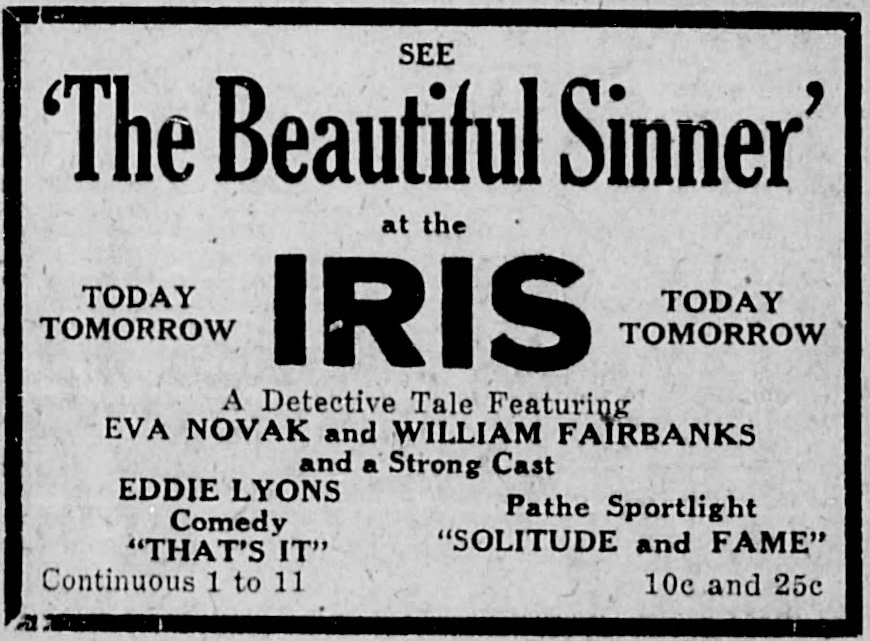
- Contemporary advertisement
- Directed by: W. S. Van Dyke
- Written by: Wilfred Lucas
- Starring: William Fairbanks; Eva Novak; George Nichols
- Cinematography: Allen M. Davey
- Production company: Perfection Pictures
- Distributed by: Columbia Pictures
- Release date: October 1, 1924
- Running time: 53 minutes
- Country: United States
- Languages: Silent; English intertitles

The Beautiful Sinner is a lost 1924 American silent Western film directed by W. S. Van Dyke and starring William Fairbanks, Eva Novak and George Nichols.

== Cast ==
- William Fairbanks as Henry Avery
- Eva Novak as Alice Carter
- George Nichols as Benson
- Kate Lester as Mrs Cornelius Westervelt
- Carmen Phillips as Carmen De Santas
- Edward W. Borman as Blinky
- Carl Stockdale as Bill Parsons

== Censorship ==
Before The Beautiful Sinner could be released in Kansas, the Kansas Board of Review required the elimination of a scene in reel 4, where someone is tortured with a lit cigar.
