= The Land of Long Shadows =

1917 silent film

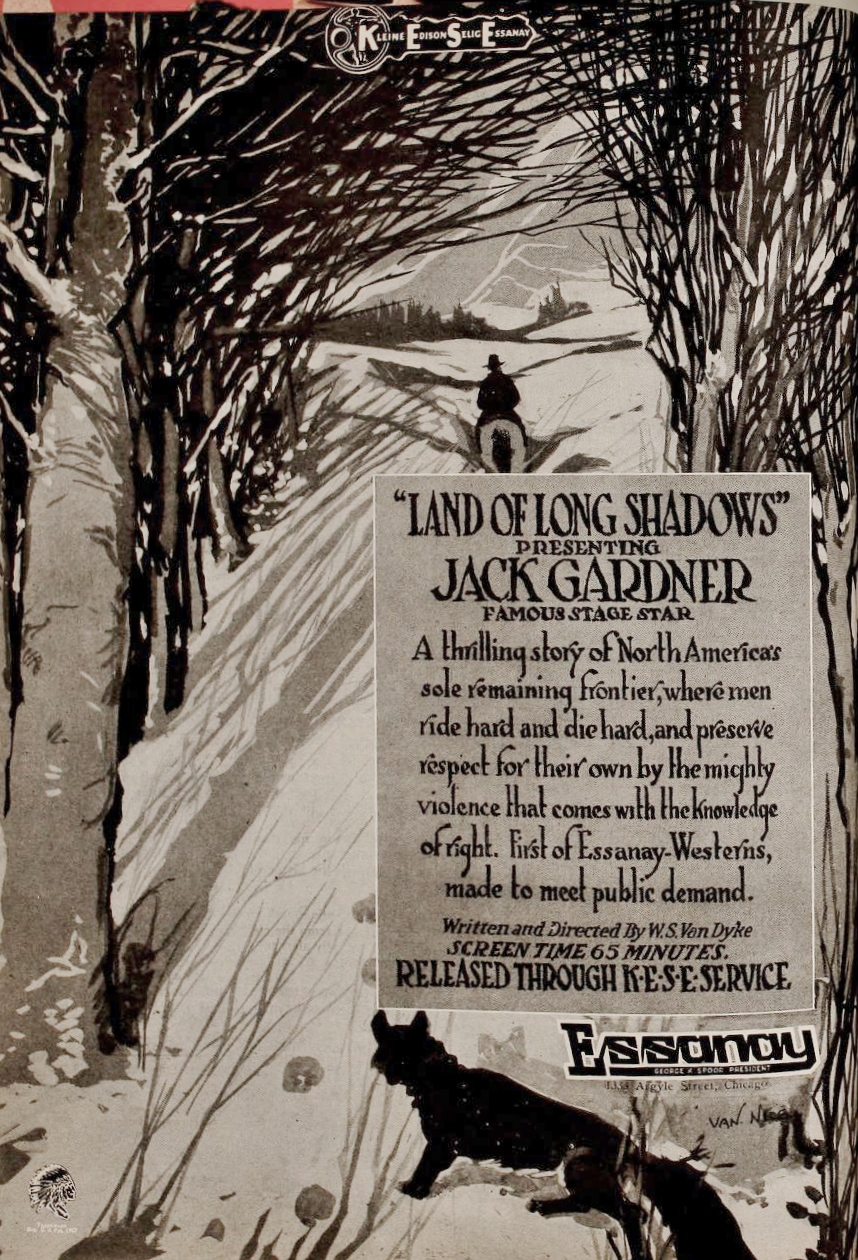
- Directed by: W.S. Van Dyke
- Written by: W.S. Van Dyke
- Starring: Jack Gardner; Ruth King; Carl Stockdale
- Production company: Essanay Studios
- Distributed by: K-E-S-E Service
- Release date: June 18, 1917
- Running time: 50 minutes
- Country: United States
- Languages: Silent; English intertitles

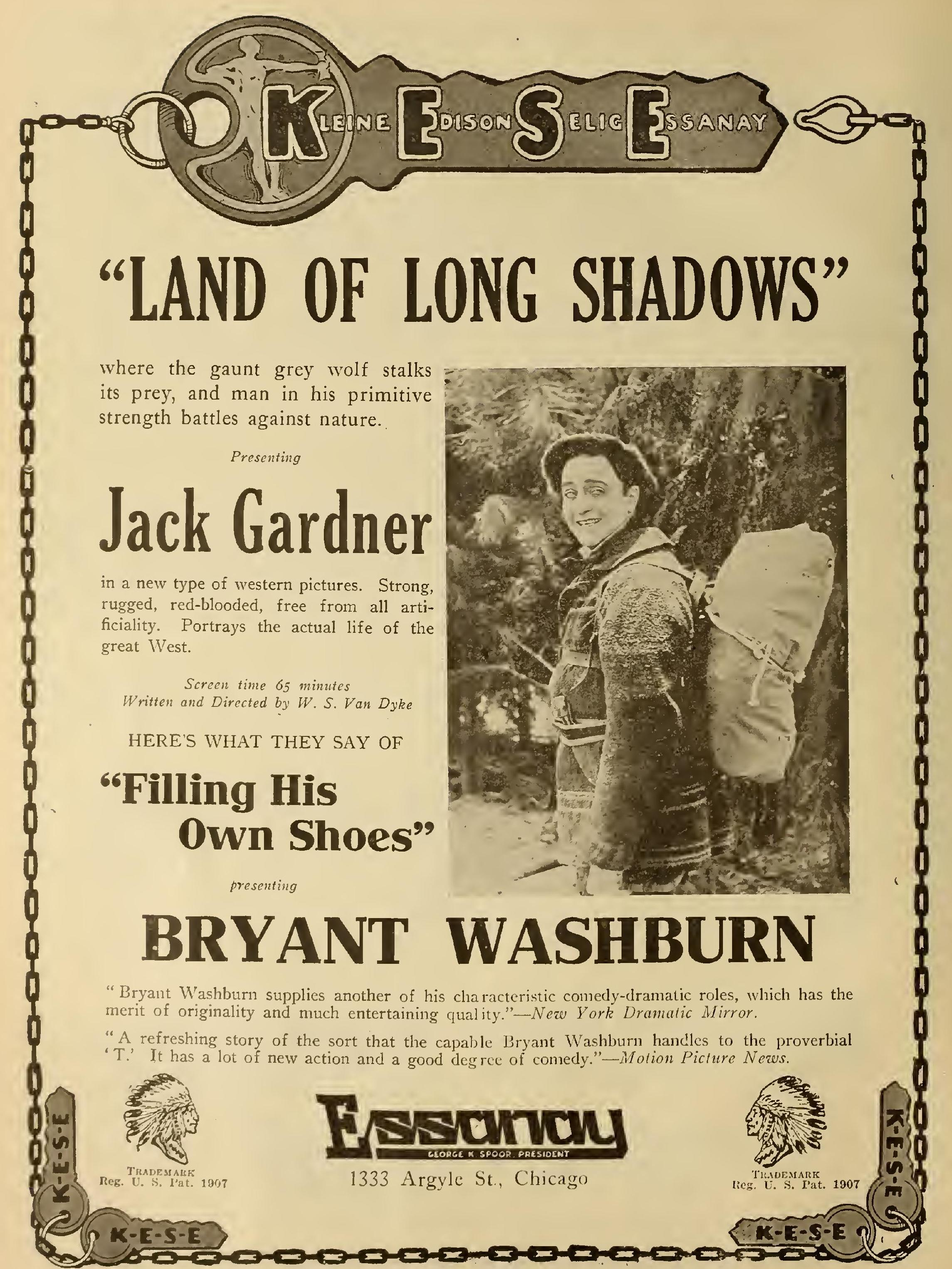
"The Land of Long Shadows" 1917 ad with Jack Gardner, written and directed by W. S. Van Dyke- from Motion Picture News

The Land of Long Shadows is a 1917 American silent drama film directed by W.S. Van Dyke and starring Jack Gardner, Ruth King and Carl Stockdale. It marked the directorial debut of Van Dyke, who later became an established director at MGM.

== Cast ==
- Jack Gardner as Joe Mauchin
- Ruth King as Jeanne Verette
- C.J. Lionel as Roul Verette
- Carl Stockdale as Constable McKenzie

== Censorship ==
Before The Land of Long Shadows could be exhibited in Kansas, the Kansas Board of Review required the elimination of five scenes where men are drinking.

== Bibliography ==
- Connelly, Robert B. The Silents: Silent Feature Films, 1910-36, Volume 40, Issue 2. December Press, 1998.
