= Breed of Men =

1919 film

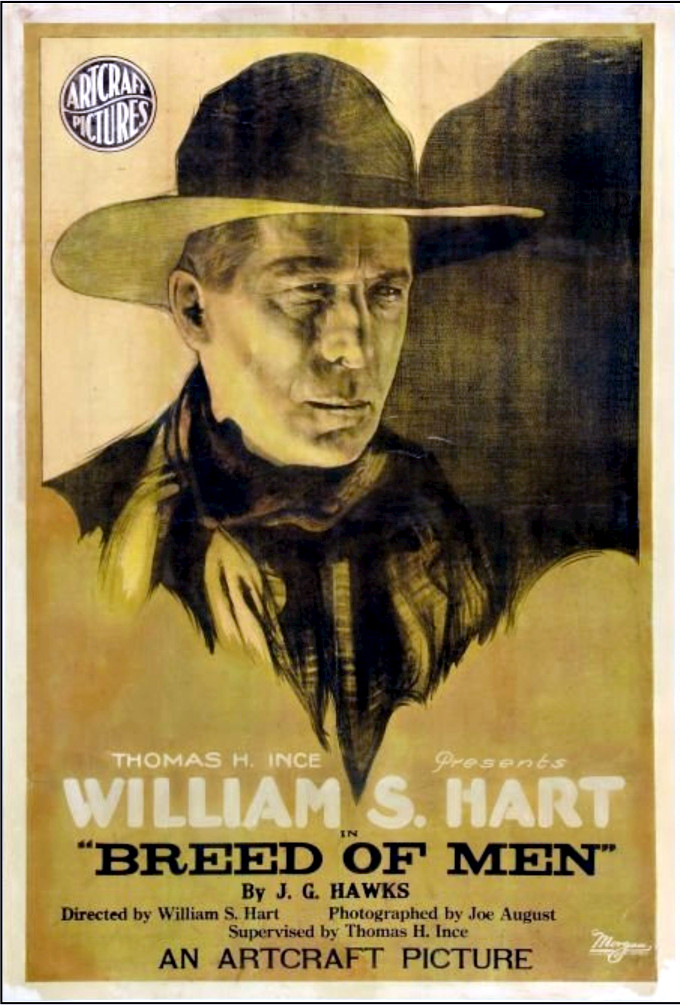
- Theatrical release poster
- Directed by: Lambert Hillyer
- Screenplay by: J.G. Hawks
- Produced by: William S. Hart; Thomas H. Ince
- Starring: William S. Hart; Seena Owen; Bert Sprotte; Buster Irving
- Cinematography: Joseph H. August
- Production companies: Famous Players–Lasky Corporation; Artcraft Pictures Corporation; William S. Hart Productions
- Distributed by: Paramount Pictures
- Release date: February 2, 1919
- Running time: 50 minutes
- Country: United States
- Languages: Silent; English intertitles

Breed of Men is a 1919 American Western silent film directed by Lambert Hillyer and written by J.G. Hawks. The film stars William S. Hart, Seena Owen, Bert Sprotte and Buster Irving. The film was released on February 2, 1919, by Paramount Pictures.

== Cast ==
- William S. Hart as Careless Carmody, A Boss Rider
- Seena Owen as Ruth Fellows
- Bert Sprotte as Wesley B. Prentice
- Buster Irving as Bobby Fellows

== Preservation status ==
- A print is preserved in the Museum of Modern Art (MOMA) collection.
