= Singer Jim McKee =

1924 film

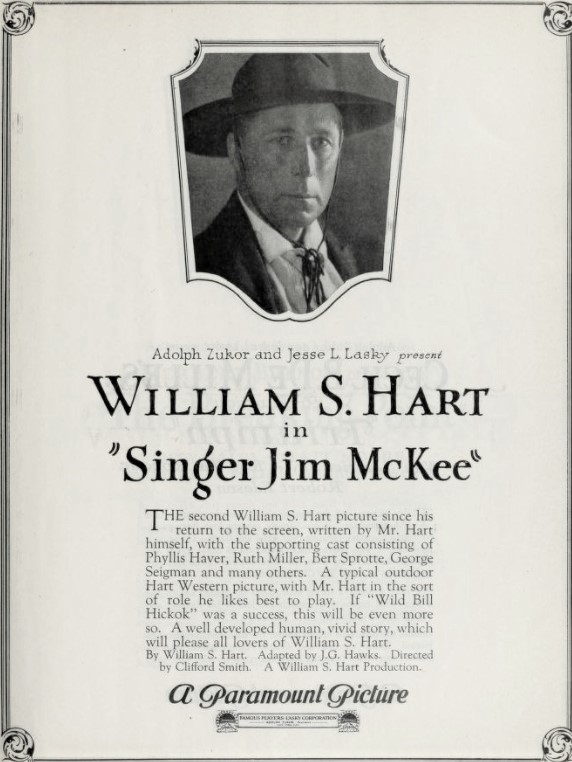
- Advertisement
- Directed by: Clifford Smith
- Written by: William S. Hart; J. G. Hawks
- Produced by: Jesse L. Lasky; Adolph Zukor; William S. Hart
- Starring: William S. Hart; Phyllis Haver; J. Gordon Russell; Bert Sprotte; Patsy Ruth Miller; Edward Coxen
- Cinematography: Dwight Warren
- Edited by: William Shea
- Production company: William S. Hart Productions
- Distributed by: Paramount Pictures
- Release date: March 3, 1924
- Running time: 70 minutes
- Country: United States
- Language: Silent (English intertitles)

Singer Jim McKee is a 1924 American silent Western film directed by Clifford Smith and written by William S. Hart and J.G. Hawks. Starring William S. Hart, Phyllis Haver, J. Gordon Russell, Bert Sprotte, Patsy Ruth Miller, and Edward Coxen, it was released on March 3, 1924, by Paramount Pictures.

== Plot ==
As described in a film magazine review, disguised as Spanish bandits, miners Singer McKee and Buck Holden hold up a stage coach. Buck is killed in an encounter with the sheriff's men. Jim escapes with Buck's baby, Mary, and rears her to womanhood. Because Mary needs clothes, Jim robs a motor bus. He is caught, but meanwhile he saves Mary from assault by a drunken suitor. Jim serves his sentence. At its expiration, he finds happiness with Mary.

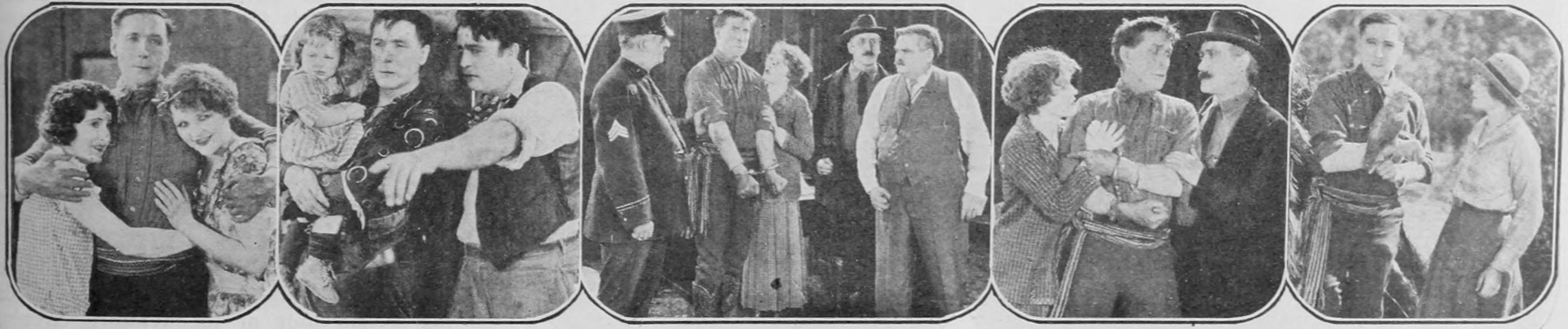
Publicity photos for the film

== Cast ==
- William S. Hart as 'Singer' Jim McKee
- Phyllis Haver as Mary Holden
- J. Gordon Russell as Buck Holden
- Bert Sprotte as Dan Gleason
- Patsy Ruth Miller as Betty Gleason
- Edward Coxen as Hamlin Glass Jr.
- William Dyer as Hamlin Glass
- George Siegmann as 'Brute' Bernstein
- Baby Turner as Mary Hold

== Preservation ==
Copies of Singer Jim McKee are held in the collections of the Library of Congress, Museum of Modern Art, UCLA Film & Television Archive, and Gosfilmofond in Moscow. The film does not appear to have been released on DVD.
