= Life of an Actress =

1927 film

- Directed by: Jack Nelson
- Written by: Harvey Gates; Langdon McCormick (play)
- Produced by: Jesse J. Goldburg
- Starring: Barbara Bedford; Bert Sprotte; Lydia Knott
- Cinematography: Ernest Miller
- Production company: Chadwick Pictures
- Distributed by: Chadwick Pictures; Butcher's Film Service (UK)
- Release date: February 15, 1927
- Running time: 70 minutes
- Country: United States
- Languages: Silent; English intertitles

Life of an Actress is a 1927 American silent drama film directed by Jack Nelson and starring Barbara Bedford, Bert Sprotte and Lydia Knott.

== Cast ==
- Barbara Bedford as Nora Dowen
- Bert Sprotte as John Dowen
- Lydia Knott as Mother Dowen
- John Patrick as Bill Hawkes
- Sheldon Lewis as Hiram Judd
- James A. Marcus as Jacob Krause
- John Hyams as Mooch Kelly
- Bobby Nelson as Bobby Judd

== Bibliography ==
- Munden, Kenneth White. The American Film Institute Catalog of Motion Pictures Produced in the United States, Part 1. University of California Press, 1997.
