= Trailin' =

1921 film

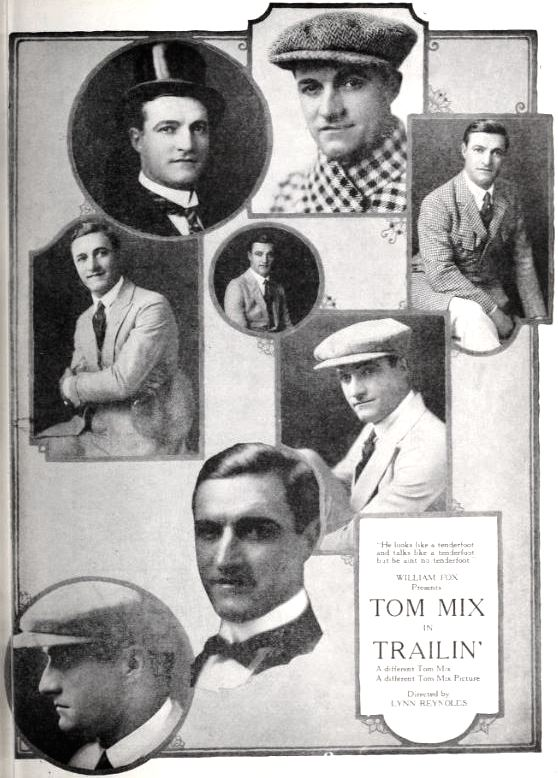
- Directed by: Lynn Reynolds
- Written by: Max Brand (novel); Lynn Reynolds
- Produced by: William Fox
- Starring: Tom Mix; Eva Novak; Bert Sprotte
- Cinematography: Benjamin H. Kline
- Production company: Fox Film Corporation
- Distributed by: Fox Film Corporation
- Release date: October 11, 1921
- Running time: 58 minutes
- Country: United States
- Languages: Silent; English intertitles

Trailin' is a 1921 American silent Western mystery film directed by Lynn Reynolds and starring Tom Mix, Eva Novak and Bert Sprotte.

== Cast ==
- Tom Mix as Anthony Woodbury
- Eva Novak as Sally Fortune
- Bert Sprotte as John Woodbury
- James Gordon as William Drew
- Sid Jordan as Steve Nash
- Carol Holloway as Joan Piotto
- J. Farrell MacDonald as Joseph Piotto
- William De Vaull as Deputy Glendon
- Harry Dunkinson as Sandy Ferguson
- Al Fremont as Lawlor
- Bert Hadley as Doctor
- Duke R. Lee as Butch Conklin
- Jay Morley as Young William Drew
- Cecil Van Auker as John Bard

== Bibliography ==
- Connelly, Robert B. The Silents: Silent Feature Films, 1910-36, Volume 40, Issue 2. December Press, 1998.
- Munden, Kenneth White. The American Film Institute Catalog of Motion Pictures Produced in the United States, Part 1. University of California Press, 1997.
- Solomon, Aubrey. The Fox Film Corporation, 1915-1935: A History and Filmography. McFarland, 2011.
