= Men of the Desert =

1917 film

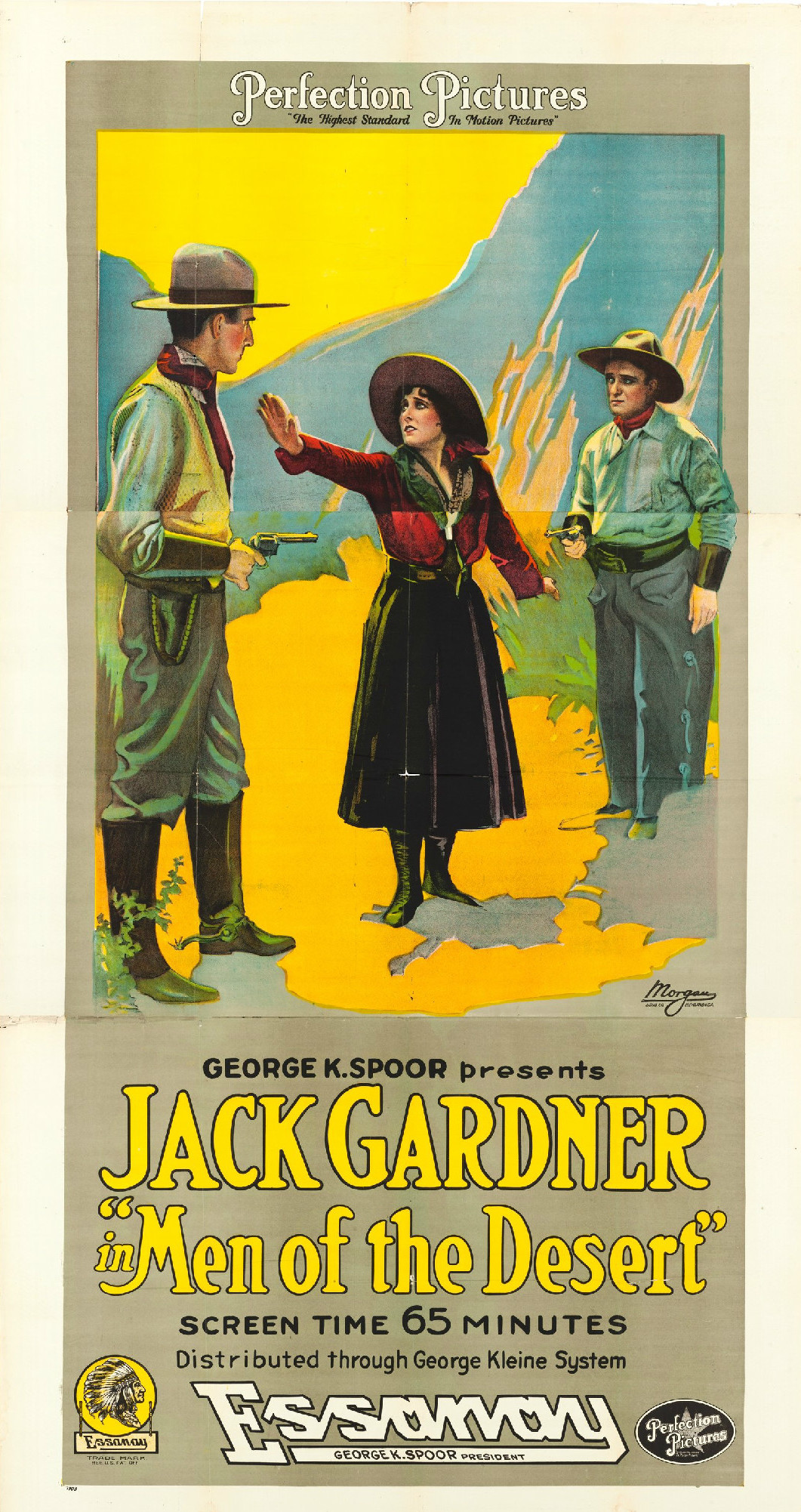
- Directed by: W.S. Van Dyke
- Written by: W.S. Van Dyke
- Starring: Jack Gardner; Carl Stockdale; Ruth King
- Production companies: Perfection Pictures; Essanay Studios
- Distributed by: K-E-S-E Service
- Release date: September 24, 1917
- Running time: 50 minutes
- Country: United States
- Languages: Silent; English intertitles

Men of the Desert is a 1917 American silent Western film directed by W.S. Van Dyke and starring Jack Gardner, Ruth King and Carl Stockdale.

== Cast ==
- Jack Gardner as Jack
- Ruth King as May
- Carl Stockdale as Mason

== Bibliography ==
- Singer, Michael. Film Directors: A Complete Guide, Volume 9. Lone Eagle Publishing, 1992.
