= Gift O' Gab =

1917 silent film

Gift o' Gab
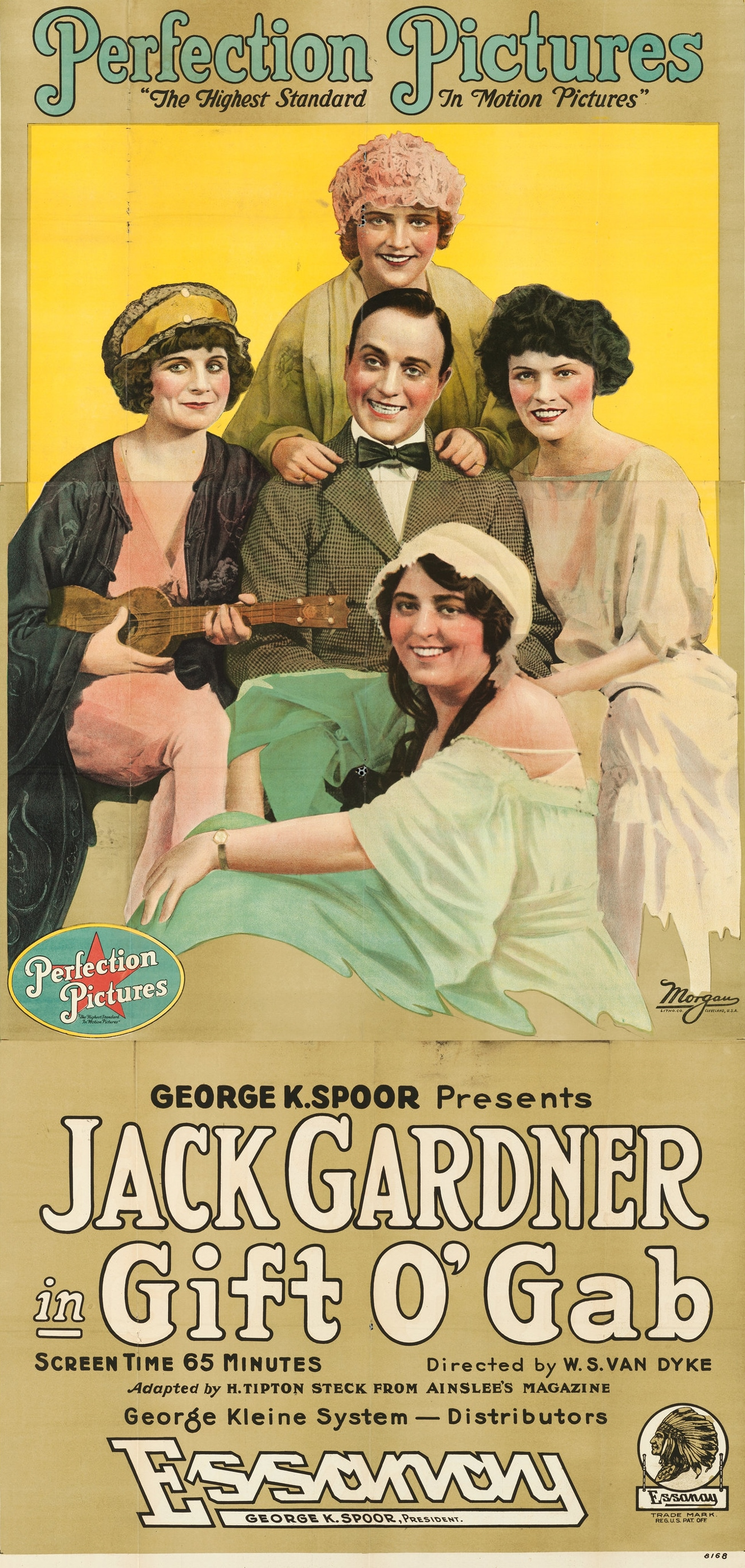
- Directed by: W.S. Van Dyke
- Written by: H. Tipton Steck
- Starring: Jack Gardner; Helen Ferguson; John Cossar
- Production companies: Perfection Pictures; Essanay Studios
- Distributed by: George Kleine System
- Release date: November 26, 1917
- Running time: 65 minutes
- Country: United States
- Languages: Silent; English intertitles

Gift o' Gab is a 1917 American silent comedy film directed by W.S. Van Dyke and starring Jack Gardner, Helen Ferguson and John Cossar.

== Cast ==
- Jack Gardner as Tom Bain
- Helen Ferguson as Peggy Dinsmore
- Frank Morris as Chub Dinsmore
- John Cossar as Mr. Dinsmore

== Bibliography ==
- Connelly, Robert B. The Silents: Silent Feature Films, 1910-36, Volume 40, Issue 2. December Press, 1998.
