= The Lady from Hell =

1926 film

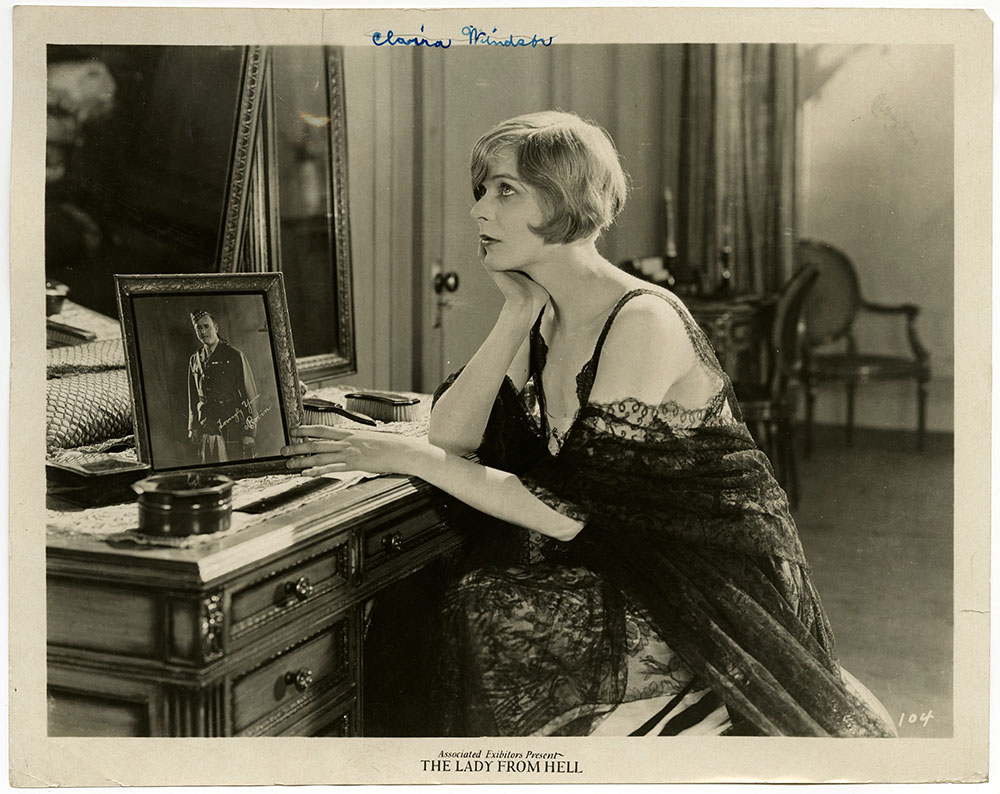
- Directed by: Stuart Paton
- Written by: J. Grubb Alexander; John W. Krafft; Norton S. Parker
- Starring: Roy Stewart; Blanche Sweet; Ralph Lewis
- Edited by: John W. Krafft
- Production company: Stuart Paton Productions
- Distributed by: Associated Exhibitors; Ideal Films
- Release date: January 7, 1926
- Running time: 50 minutes
- Country: United States
- Language: Silent (English intertitles)

(not to be confused with the 1929 Mary Astor film --The Woman from Hell) The Lady from Hell is a 1926 American silent Western film directed by Stuart Paton and starring Roy Stewart, Blanche Sweet, and Ralph Lewis.

It was released in the United Kingdom later the same year by Ideal Films under the alternative title of Interrupted Wedding.

== Plot ==
As described in a film magazine review, following his service in World War I, Sir Robin Carmichael, a former British army officer from Scotland who works as a foreman of a ranch in America under an assumed name, gives a woman a gun to protect herself against her brutal husband. The woman’s little son Billy kills his father to save her from being beaten. In the meantime, Sir Robin has returned to his home in Scotland and is about to be wed to Lady Margaret Darnely. He is extradited back to the American town near the ranch on his wedding day on a charge of murder, but is cleared by the confession of the boy and his mother.

== Cast ==
- Roy Stewart as Sir Robin Carmichael
- Blanche Sweet as Lady Margaret Darnely
- Ralph Lewis as Earl of Kennet
- Frank Elliott as Sir Hugh Stafford
- Edgar Norton as Honorable Charles Darnely
- Margaret Campbell as Lady Darnely
- Ruth King as Lucy Wallace
- Michael D. Moore as Billy Boy
- Mark Hamilton as Tex Marvin

== Preservation ==
This film after being lost for decades was discovered in a New Zealand film archive and repatriated to the US.
