= Carol Holloway =

American actress

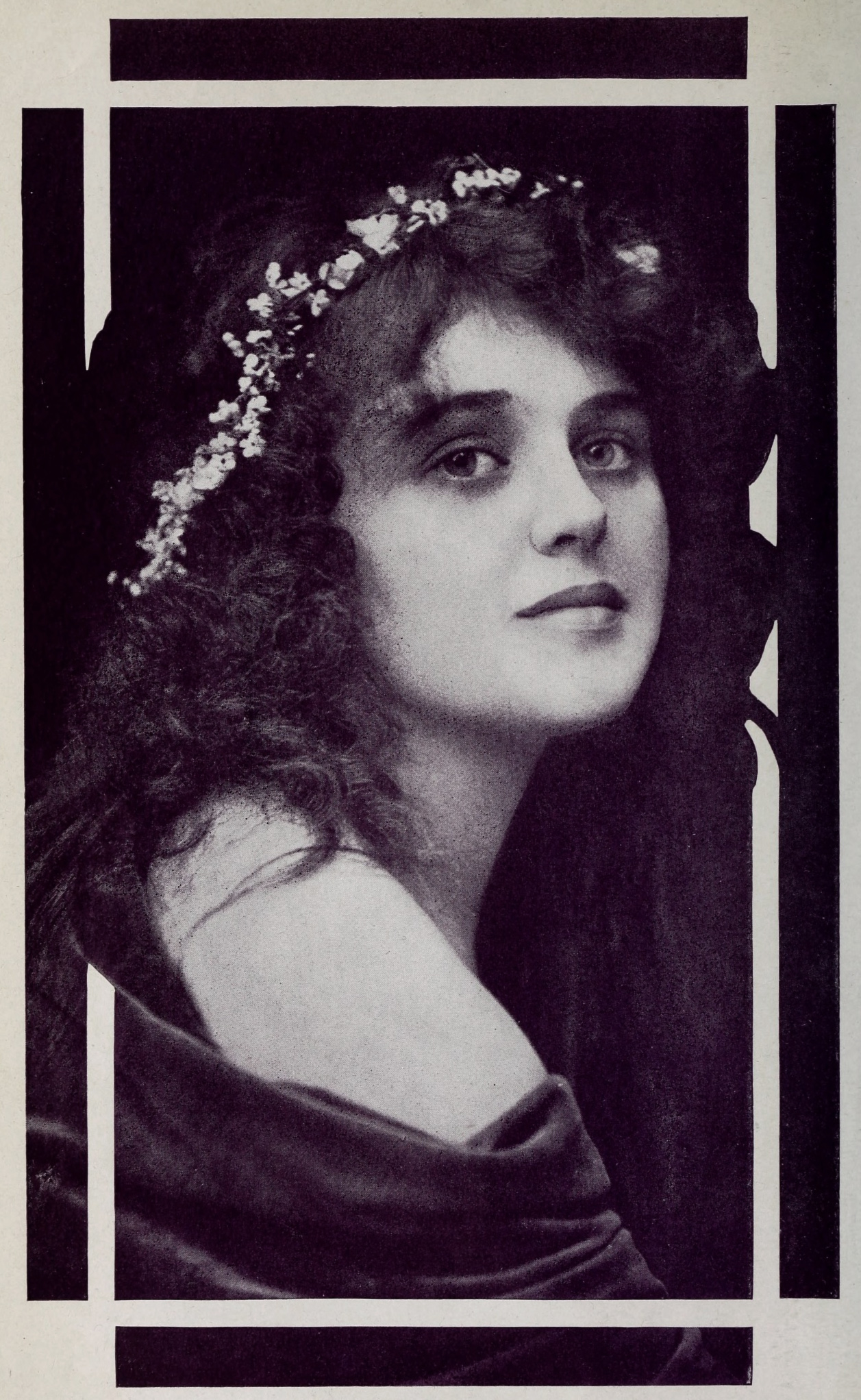
- Holloway in 1914
- Born: April 30, 1892; Williamstown, Massachusetts, US
- Died: January 3, 1979 (aged 86); Los Angeles, California, US
- Years active: 1913–1941

Carol Holloway (April 30, 1892 – January 3, 1979) was an American actress of the silent film era. She appeared in more than 110 films between 1914 and 1941. She was born in Williamstown, Massachusetts and died in California.

== Partial filmography ==
- A Gentleman of Leisure (1915)
- The Fighting Trail (1917)
- 'If Only' Jim (1920)
- Dangerous Love (1920)
- Two Moons (1920)
- The Saphead (1920)
- The Sea Lion (1921)
- Trailin' (1921)
- Rich Men's Wives (1922)
- Up and Going (1922)
- Cordelia the Magnificent (1923)
- Gossip (1923)
- The Ramblin' Kid (1923)
- Why Women Remarry (1923)
- The Love Pirate (1923)
- Beau Brummel (1924)
- The Rainbow Trail (1925)
- The Shoot 'Em Up Kid (1926) (*story)
- Jake the Plumber (1927)
- The Cherokee Kid (1927)
- Chicken a La King (1928)
- The Night of Nights (1939) (uncredited)
