= The Range Boss =

1917 film

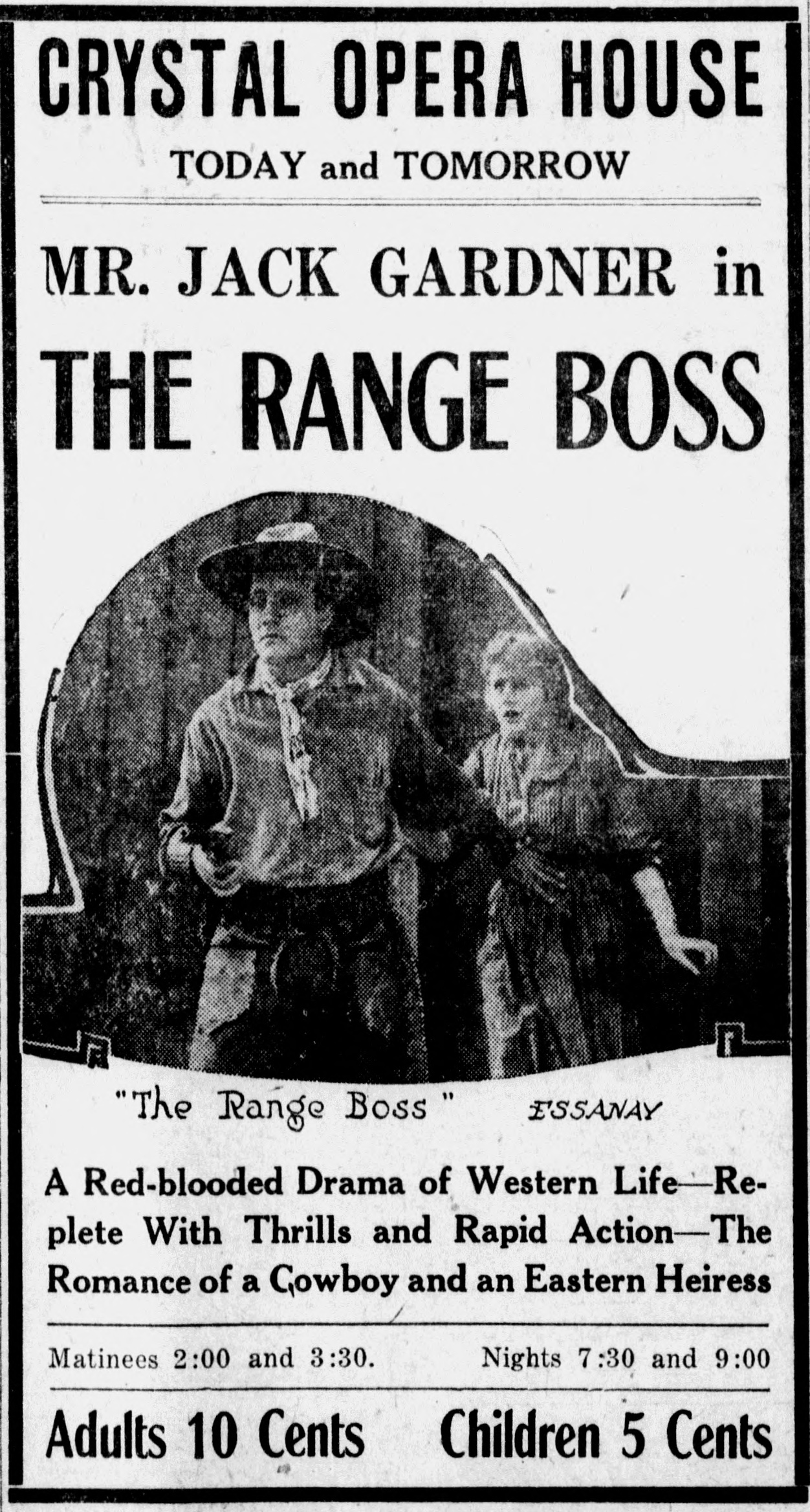
- Contemporary advertisement
- Directed by: W. S. Van Dyke
- Written by: W. S. Van Dyke
- Based on: The Range Boss (novel ) by Charles Alden Seltzer
- Starring: Jack Gardner; Ruth King
- Production company: Essanay Studios
- Distributed by: K-E-S-E
- Release date: July 16, 1917
- Running time: 5 reels
- Country: United States
- Languages: Silent; English intertitles

The Range Boss is a 1917 American silent Western film directed by W. S. Van Dyke and starring Jack Gardner. It was produced by the Essanay Film Company and released through K-E-S-E.

== Cast ==
- Jack Gardner - Rex Randerson
- Ruth King - Ruth Harkness
- Carl Stockdale - Willard Masten

== Preservation status ==
A 35 mm print of the film is held by George Eastman House.
