= W. S. Van Dyke =

American film director (1889–1943)

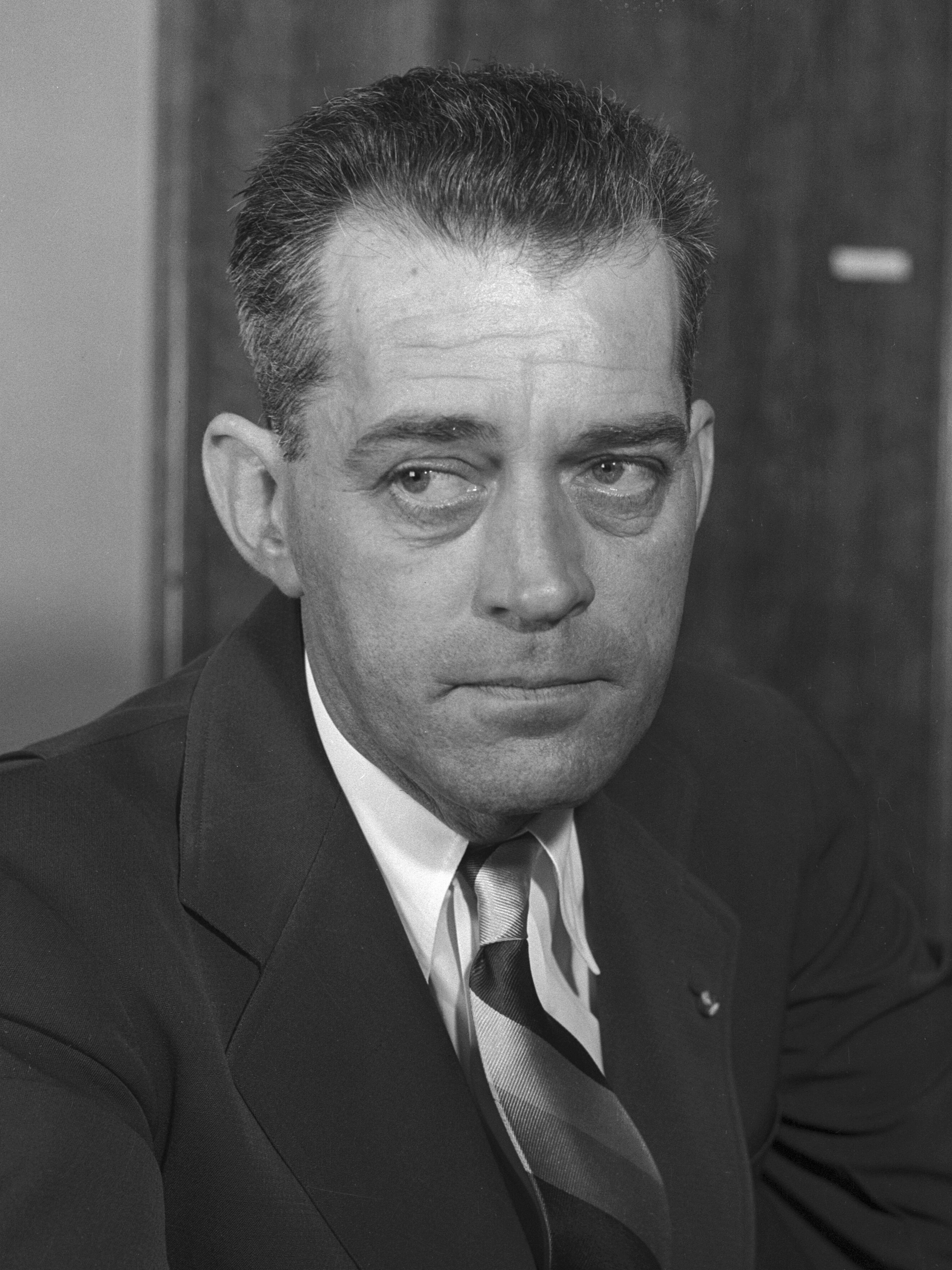
- Van Dyke in 1933
- Born: Woodbridge Strong Van Dyke II; March 21, 1889; San Diego, California, U.S.
- Died: February 5, 1943 (aged 53); Los Angeles, California, U.S.
- Resting place: Forest Lawn Memorial Park (Glendale)
- Other name: One Take Woody
- Occupations: Film director, writer
- Years active: 1915–1942
- Spouse: Ruth Mannix (m. 1935–1943)
- Children: 3

Woodbridge Strong Van Dyke II (March 21, 1889 – February 5, 1943) was an American film director who made several early sound films, including Tarzan the Ape Man in 1932, The Thin Man in 1934, San Francisco in 1936, and six popular musicals with Nelson Eddy and Jeanette MacDonald. He received two Academy Award nominations for Best Director for The Thin Man and San Francisco, and directed four actors to Oscar nominations: William Powell, Spencer Tracy, Norma Shearer, and Robert Morley. Known as a reliable craftsman who made his films on schedule and under budget, he earned the name "One Take Woody" for his efficient style of filming.

== Early life ==
Van Dyke was born on March 21, 1889, in San Diego, California. His father was a superior court judge who died the day his son was born. His mother, Laura Winston, returned to her former acting career. As a child actor, Van Dyke appeared with his mother on the vaudeville circuit with traveling stock companies. They traveled the west coast and into the Middle West. When he was five years old, they appeared at the old San Francisco Grand Opera House in Blind Girl. He would later remember his education,

I think I've been to school in every state in the Union. Whenever the company stopped off long enough in any city I went back behind a school desk. The rest of the time my mother taught me.

When Van Dyke was fourteen years old, he moved to Seattle to live with his grandmother. While attending business school, he worked several part-time jobs, including janitor, waiter, salesman, and railroad attendant. Van Dyke's early adult years were unsettled, and he moved among jobs.

== Career ==
In 1915, Van Dyke found work as an assistant director to D. W. Griffith on the film The Birth of a Nation. The following year, he was Griffith's assistant director on Intolerance. That same year he worked as an assistant director to James Young on Unprotected (1916), The Lash (1916), and the lost film Oliver Twist, in which he also played the role of Charles Dickens.

In 1917, Van Dyke directed his first film, The Land of Long Shadows, for Essanay Studios. That same year he directed five other films: The Range Boss, Open Places, Men of the Desert, Gift O' Gab, and Sadie Goes to Heaven. In 1927, he traveled to Tacoma to direct two silent films for the new H.C. Weaver Productions: Eyes of the Totem and The Heart of the Yukon (the latter is considered a lost film). According to Tim McCoy in his autobiography, Van Dyke, who directed him in War Paint and five others for MGM in the late 1920s, was eventually to become a giant among Hollywood's creative geniuses. McCoy went on to say, "For in addition to being annoyingly arrogant, maddeningly self-opinionated, damned sure of himself and utterly ruthless, Van was truly a great director." McCoy went on to say, "he (Van Dyke) evidenced a degree of concern for my well-being on a par with the level of compassion that might have been exhibited by a nineteenth-century Arab slaver herding a batch of the lately damned across the equator." He then told a similar story, which Robert Cannom's Van Dyke biography mentioned in some detail, but lacking Cannom's sugar-coated retelling. An extra fired a blank round too close to McCoy's face, knocking him off his horse and causing pain and a wound needing hospitalization. McCoy said that Van Dyke cursed him soundly for falling off his horse and ruining the shot. He asked him if he was ready for another shot and then cautioned McCoy "to try to do it right."

During the silent era he learned his craft and by the advent of the talkies was one of MGM's most reliable directors. He came to be known as "One-Take Woody" or "One-Take Van Dyke", for the speed with which he would complete his assignments. MGM regarded him as one of the most versatile, equally at home directing costume dramas, westerns, comedies, crime melodramas, and musicals.

Many of his films were huge hits and topped the box office in any given year. He received Academy Award for Best Director nominations for The Thin Man (1934) and San Francisco (1936). He also directed the Oscar-winning classic Eskimo (also known as Mala the Magnificent), in which he also has a featured acting role.

His other films include the island adventure White Shadows in the South Seas (1928); its follow-up, The Pagan (1929); Trader Horn (1931), which was filmed almost entirely in Africa; Tarzan the Ape Man (1932); Manhattan Melodrama (1934); and Marie Antoinette (1938). He is perhaps best remembered, however, for directing Myrna Loy and William Powell in four Thin Man films: The Thin Man (1934), After the Thin Man (1936), Another Thin Man (1939), and Shadow of the Thin Man (1941); and Jeanette MacDonald and Nelson Eddy in six of their greatest hits, Naughty Marietta (1935), Rose Marie (1936), Sweethearts (1938), New Moon (1940) (uncredited because halfway through filming Robert Z. Leonard took over), Bitter Sweet (1940), and I Married an Angel (1942).

The earthquake sequence in San Francisco is considered one of the best special-effects sequences ever filmed. To help direct, Van Dyke called upon his early mentor, D. W. Griffith, who had fallen on hard times. Van Dyke was also known to hire old-time, out-of-work actors as extras.

Van Dyke was known for allowing ad-libbing (that remained in the film) and for coaxing natural performances from his actors. He made stars of Nelson Eddy, James Stewart, Myrna Loy, Johnny Weissmuller, Maureen O'Sullivan, Eleanor Powell, Ilona Massey, and Margaret O'Brien. He was often called in to work a few days (or more), uncredited, on a film that was in trouble or had gone over the production schedule.

Van Dyke was commissioned a captain in the United States Marine Corps Reserve in 1934. On September 13, 1935, he was promoted to the rank of major in the reserves. Prior to World War II, the patriotic Van Dyke set up a Marine Corps Reserve recruiting office in his own office at MGM. His rank of major often showed up in his later film credits, and he was influential in encouraging other MGM stars to join the military during the early days of the war, including Clark Gable, James Stewart, and Robert Taylor.

== Final years and death ==
By 1933, Van Dyke had a 3 1/2-acre (1.4 ha) estate in the Brentwood neighborhood of Los Angeles, on 334 South Bundy Drive, which he added on to several times to accommodate his collection of artifacts from world travel and allow large groups of friends for entertainment purposes. The house was razed by the early 1960s and the grounds were converted by 1965 into a cul-de-sac named Rose Marie Lane with eight large homes.

In the latter half of 1942, despite being ill with cancer and a bad heart, Van Dyke managed to direct one last film, Journey for Margaret, which premiered in New York City on December 17 that year. The movie made 5-year-old Margaret O'Brien an overnight star.

Van Dyke, a devout Christian Scientist, had refused most medical treatments and care during his final years. Following the general release of Journey for Margaret to theaters in January 1943, he said his goodbyes to his wife Ruth Elizabeth Mannix, his three children, and to studio boss Louis B. Mayer and then died by suicide on February 5 in Brentwood. Both Jeanette MacDonald and Nelson Eddy, in accordance with Van Dyke's wishes, sang and officiated at his funeral.

His cremated remains are interred at Forest Lawn Memorial Park Cemetery in Glendale, with those of his mother, Laura Winston Van Dyke, in the Great Mausoleum, Columbarium of the Sanctuaries, Niche 10212.

== Family ==
W. S. Van Dyke's mother, Laura Winston Van Dyke, was an enthusiastic genealogist and made sure he had known his own family history. He subsequently joined a number of male hereditary societies based in Los Angeles. He was a member of the National Society Sons of the American Revolution having joined on September 22, 1933, No. 53277, California Society No. CA 1707 based on a documented direct descent from John Honeyman (1729–1822), aide to General James Wolfe in the French and Indian Wars and later a spy for George Washington during the Revolution. That same year, 1933, he joined the Sons of the Revolution in the State of California on the same documented descent from John Honeyman, Membership No. 1847. He also became a member of the Order of the Founders and Patriots of America, No. 7141, CA 48, in 1933 documenting descent from Jan Van Dyke (1709–1778), who was killed while fighting beside Washington at Monmouth, and Thomasse Janse Van Dyke (1581–1665). Van Dyke ultimately was invited to become a life member in the most difficult to join, Society of Colonial Wars, #8634, California Society #397, admitted January 23, 1934. He joined on a direct descent from Capt. Jan Janse Van Dyke (1652–1736) and Governor William Leete (1613–1683). He was the great great grandson of Abraham Van Dyke (1753–1804), who was with Washington at Morristown. Van Dyke was admitted to membership in the Barons of Runnymede, now known as Baronial Order of Magna Charta in January 1935, Member No. 441, and Military Order of the Crusades in December 1935, Member No. 13 both based on a descent from Governor Thomas Dudley of Massachusetts.

Marcia Van Dyke, violinist and actress, was a cousin of W. S. Van Dyke.

== Legacy ==
Van Dyke and his career were the subject of a 424-page well-detailed biography published in 1948 by Robert C. Cannom which made use of extensive interviews with Van Dyke's co-workers and had the complete cooperation of Metro Goldwyn Mayer. The author was allowed full access to Van Dyke's files and photographs archived with the studio in Culver City, Calif.

On January 20, 1937, Van Dyke and Clark Gable had their signature, hand and shoe print impressions cast in greenish cement at Grauman's Chinese Theater on Hollywood Boulevard.

On February 8, 1960, Van Dyke received a star on the Hollywood Walk of Fame for his contribution to Motion Pictures, at 6141 Hollywood Boulevard.

== Awards and nominations ==
Year	Award	Category	Film	Result
1930	Academy Award	Best Cinematography (Clyde Da Vinna)	White Shadows in the South Seas	Won
1931	Academy Award	Best Picture	Trader Horn	Nominated
1934	Academy Award	Best Film Editing (Conrad A. Nervig)	Eskimo / Mala the Magnificent	Won
1935	Academy Award	Best Director	The Thin Man	Nominated
1936	Venice Film Festival	Best Foreign Film	San Francisco	Nominated
1937	Academy Award	Best Director	San Francisco	Nominated
1938	Venice Film Festival	Best Foreign Film	Marie Antoinette	Nominated

== Filmography ==
- The Land of Long Shadows (1917)
- The Range Boss (1917)
- Open Places (1917)
- Men of the Desert (1917)
- Gift O' Gab (1917)
- Sadie Goes to Heaven (1917)
- The Lady of the Dugout (1918)
- The Hawk's Trail (1919)
- Daredevil Jack (1920)
- Double Adventure (1921)
- The Avenging Arrow (1921)
- Forget Me Not (1922)
- White Eagle (1922)
- The Milky Way (1922)
- According to Hoyle (1922)
- The Boss of Camp 4 (1922)
- The Miracle Makers (1923)
- The Destroying Angel (1923)
- The Little Girl Next Door (1923)
- Ruth of the Range (1923) (uncredited)
- Half-A-Dollar-Bill (1924)
- Loving Lies (1924)
- The Battling Fool (1924)
- The Beautiful Sinner (1924)
- Winner Take All (1924)
- Gold Heels (1924)
- The Trail Rider (1925)
- Hearts and Spurs (1925)
- The Timber Wolf (1925)
- The Desert's Price (1925)
- Ranger of the Big Pines (1925)
- Barriers Burned Away (1925)
- The Gentle Cyclone (1926)
- War Paint (1926)
- Winners of the Wilderness (1927)
- The Heart of the Yukon (1927)
- California (1927)
- Spoilers of the West (1927)
- Foreign Devils (1927)
- Eyes of the Totem (1927)
- Under the Black Eagle (1928)
- Wyoming (1928)
- White Shadows in the South Seas (1928)
- The Pagan (1929)
- Trader Horn (1931)
- The Cuban Love Song (1931)
- Guilty Hands (1931)
- Never the Twain Shall Meet (1931)
- Tarzan the Ape Man (1932)
- Night Court (1932)
- Penthouse (1933)
- The Prizefighter and the Lady (1933)
- Eskimo (1933)
- Manhattan Melodrama (1934)
- The Thin Man (1934)
- Hide-Out (1934)
- Forsaking All Others (1934)
- Laughing Boy (1934)
- I Live My Life (1935)
- Naughty Marietta (1935)
- Rose Marie (1936)
- San Francisco (1936)
- His Brother's Wife (1936)
- The Devil Is a Sissy (1936)
- Love on the Run (1936)
- After the Thin Man (1936)
- They Gave Him a Gun (1937)
- Personal Property (1937)
- Rosalie (1937)
- Marie Antoinette (1938)
- Sweethearts (1938)
- Stand Up and Fight (1939)
- It's a Wonderful World (1939)
- Andy Hardy Gets Spring Fever (1939)
- Another Thin Man (1939)
- I Take This Woman (1940)
- I Love You Again (1940)
- Bitter Sweet (1940)
- New Moon (1940) (uncredited)
- Rage in Heaven (1941)
- The Feminine Touch (1941)
- Shadow of the Thin Man (1941)
- Dr. Kildare's Victory (1942)
- I Married an Angel (1942)
- Cairo (1942)
- Journey for Margaret (1942)
