= Carl Stockdale =

American actor (1874–1953)

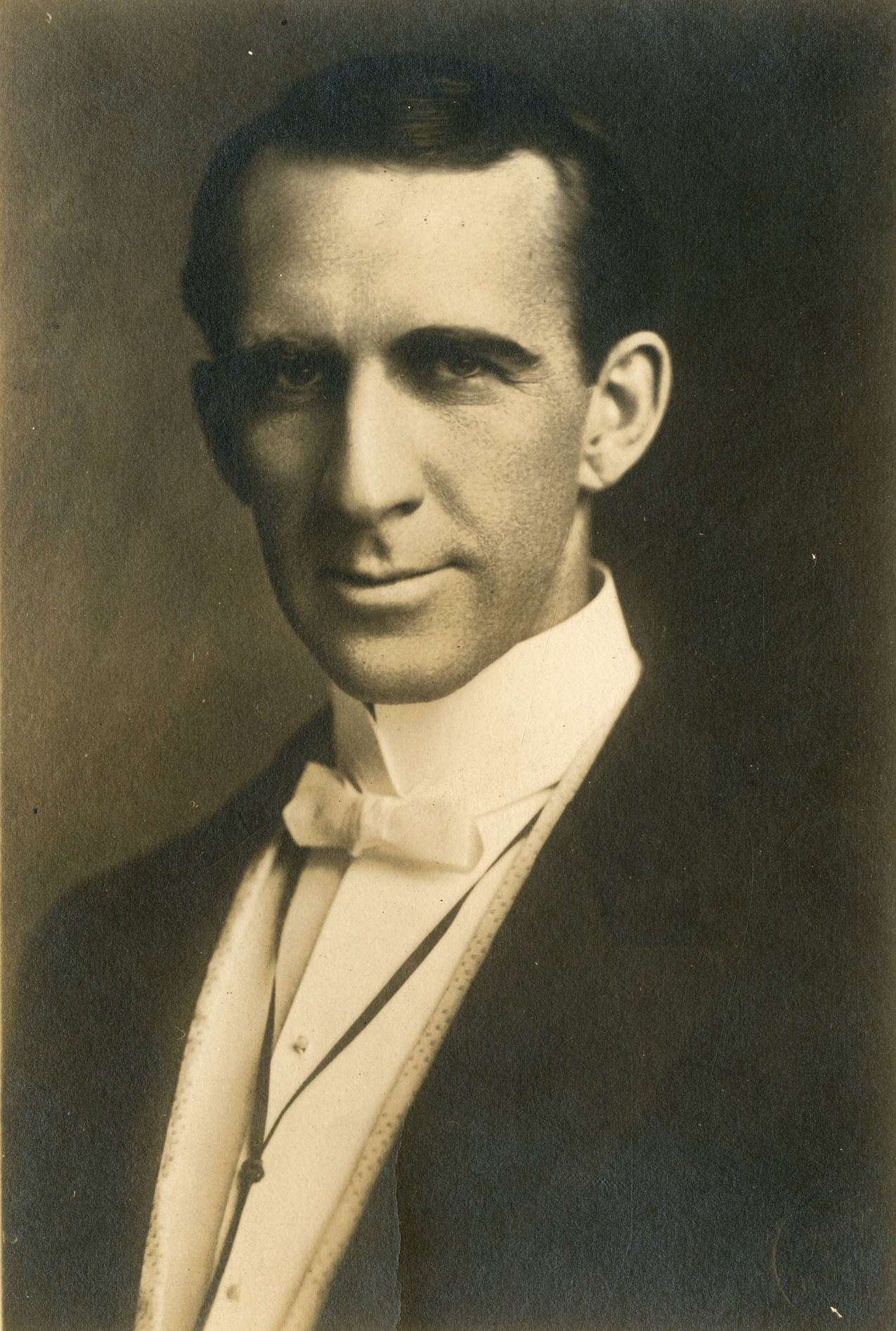
- Stockdale in 1913
- Born: William Carlton Stockdale; February 18, 1874; Worthington, Minnesota, U.S.
- Died: March 15, 1953 (aged 79); Woodland Hill, Los Angeles, California, U.S.
- Resting place: Hollywood Forever Cemetery
- Other name: Carlton Stockdale
- Education: University of North Dakota
- Occupation: Actor
- Years active: 1913–1943
- Spouse: Clara Byers (m. 1908; div. 1915)

William Carlton Stockdale (February 19, 1874 – March 15, 1953) was one of the longest-working Hollywood actors, with a career dating from the early 1910s. He also made the difficult transition from silent films to talkies.

Stockdale was born on February 19, 1874, in Worthington, Minnesota, graduated from Minneapolis Central High School, and attended the University of North Dakota.

Before he began working with films, Stockdale was a property man with a repertory theatrical company headed by his brother. He went on to act on stage in repertory theater and in vaudeville.

Stockdale was in Hollywood as early as 1913 with a small role in Gilbert M. Anderson's Broncho Billy's Last Deed. He worked with that film franchise for two years before joining D. W. Griffith's film company. He remained busy into the 1940s. His last film was released in 1943.

== Connection to the Murder of William Desmond Taylor ==
Stockdale told reporters in an interview at his home in 1937 that he was with Charlotte Shelby from 7 to 9 p.m. at her home on February 1, 1922, when William Desmond Taylor was killed.

== Personal life and death ==
On January 11, 1908, Stockdale married actress Clara Byers. The couple then acted together for two seasons at the Alisky and Grand theaters in Sacramento as members of the Lawrence and Sandusky stock theater troupe. On March 26, 1915, she sued him for divorce. He died of a heart attack on March 15, 1953, in Woodland Hills, California. He is buried in Hollywood Forever Cemetery.

== Filmography ==
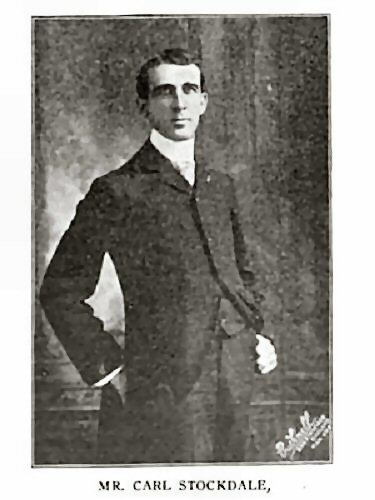
Photo from Book Notes, 1901

- Broncho Billy's Last Deed (1913) (film debut)
- The Good-for-Nothing (1914) - John Sterling
- The Champion (1915, Short) - Sparring Partner (uncredited)
- A Jitney Elopement (1915, Short) - Cop (uncredited)
- My Best Girl (1915) - Colonel Lane
- The Bank (1915, Short) - Cashier
- Hoodoo Ann (1916) - Gordon Sanderson/Mustang Charley
- A Child of the Paris Streets (1916) - Judge de Tolne
- Casey at the Bat (1916) - Hicks
- Stranded (1916) - Stoner
- Intolerance (1916) - King Nabonidus
- The Little Liar (1916) - Dick Slade
- Atta Boy's Last Race (1916) - Jarvis Johnson
- The Children Pay (1916) - Judge Mason
- Oliver Twist (1916) - Monks
- The Americano (1916) - Salsa Espada
- Lost and Won (1917) - Kirkland Gaige
- A Daughter of the Poor (1917) - James Stevens
- Might and the Man (1917) - Billings
- The Land of Long Shadows (1917) - Constable McKenzie
- The Range Boss (1917) - Willard Masten
- Open Places (1917) - Dan Clark
- Men of the Desert (1917) - Mason
- Peggy Leads the Way (1917) - Roland Gardiner
- New York Luck (1917) - Palter
- In Bad (1918) - Slick Edwards
- The Midnight Trail (1918) - Harvey Faxon
- The Biggest Show on Earth (1918) - Col. Jeffrey Trent
- Hearts or Diamonds? (1918) - Bewley
- Kidder & Ko (1918) - Minor Role
- Up Romance Road (1918) - Count Hilgar Eckstrom
- The Eyes of Julia Deep (1918) - Simon Plummet
- The Bells (1918) - Gari
- The Lady of the Dugout (1918) - Zonie, The Killer
- Hobbs in a Hurry (1918) - Angus MacDonald
- Rosemary Climbs the Heights (1918) - Andrieff
- Wives and Other Wives (1918) - Ted Doubleday
- When a Man Rides Alone (1919) - The Vulture
- The Amazing Impostor (1919) - Robert La Rue
- Where the West Begins (1919) - Gunner McCann
- Brass Buttons (1919) - Cold-Deck Dallas
- The Intrusion of Isabel (1919) - James Harris
- The Unpainted Woman (1919) - Pliny
- The Pagan God (1919) - Henry Addison
- The Sundown Trail (1919) - The Planter
- The Woman Under Cover (1919) - Minor Role
- The Pointing Finger (1919) - Grosset
- The Coast of Opportunity (1920) - Private Secretary
- $30,000 (1920) - Ferdinand Spargo
- Double Adventure (1921) - Jules Fernol
- Society Secrets (1921) - Squire
- One a Minute (1921) - Judge (uncredited)
- Molly O (1921) - The Silhouette Man
- Oliver Twist (1922) - Monks
- Thorns and Orange Blossoms (1922)
- The Call of Home (1922)
- The Half Breed (1922)
- The Darling of New York (1923)
- Tainted Money (1924)
- The Whispered Name (1924)
- The Beautiful Sinner (1924)
- Gold Heels (1924)
- A Son of His Father (1925)
- The Business of Love (1925)
- Bardelys the Magnificent (1926)
- Twinkletoes (1926)
- The Devil's Partner (1926)
- The Notorious Lady (1927)
- See You in Jail (1927)
- The King of Kings (1927)
- Air Mail Pilot (1928)
- The Shepherd of the Hills (1928)
- The Black Pearl (1928)
- Jazzland (1928)
- The Bride of the Colorado (1928)
- The Love Parade (1929)
- The Divorcee (1930)
- Abraham Lincoln (1930)
- Billy the Kid (1930)
- Hell's Island (1930)
- Cimarron (1931)
- A Free Soul (1931)
- Get That Girl (1932)
- The Vampire Bat (1933)
- Turn Back the Clock (1933)
- The Prizefighter and the Lady (1933)
- Laughing Boy (1934)
- The Man Who Reclaimed His Head (1934)
- Mad Love (1935)
- Dr. Socrates (1935)
- Revolt of the Zombies (1936)
- Fury (1936)
- San Francisco (1936)
- The Gorgeous Hussy (1936)
- Battle of Greed (1937)
- Lost Horizon (1937)
- Saratoga (1937)
- My Dear Miss Aldrich (1937)
- The Girl Said No (1937)
- Youth on Parole (1937)
- Law for Tombstone (1937)
- Blockade (1938)
- Marie Antoinette (1938)
- King of the Underworld (1939)
- Lucky Night (1939)
- Mr. Smith Goes to Washington (1939)
- The Captain Is a Lady (1940)
- Honky Tonk (1941)
- Unexpected Uncle (1941)
- The Devil and Daniel Webster (1941)
- Miss Polly (1941)
- Ten Gentlemen from West Point (1942)
- The Falcon's Brother (1942)
- Tennessee Johnson (1942)
- Hangmen Also Die! (1943) (final film)
