= What Every Girl Should Know =

What Every Girl Should Know may refer to:

- "What Every Girl Should Know" (song), a song by Robert Wells
- What Every Girl Should Know (album), a 1959 album by Doris Day
- What Every Girl Should Know (film), a 1927 American romance film
