= The School Teacher and the Waif =

1912 American drama film directed by D W Griffith

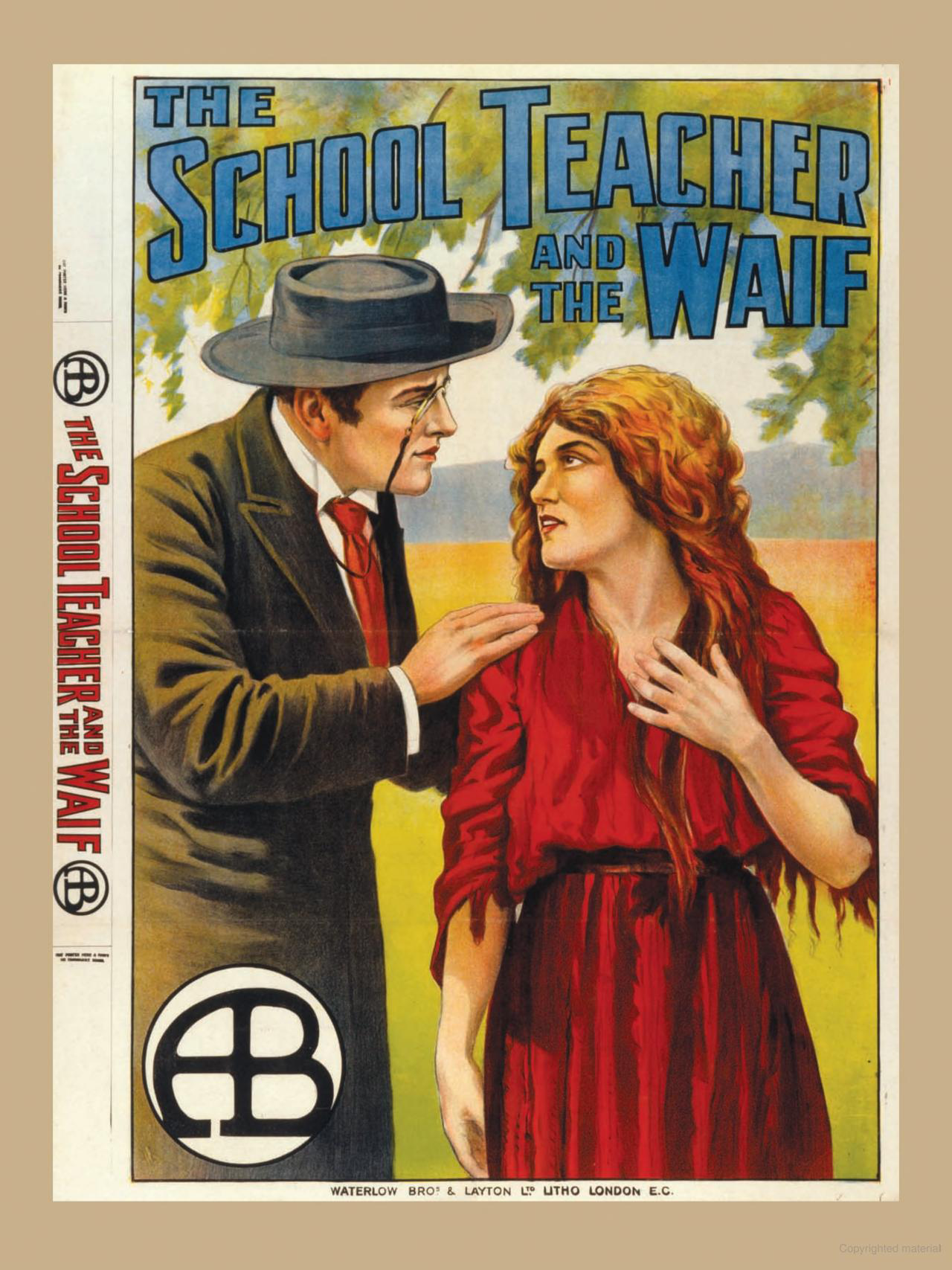
- Movie poster
- Directed by: D. W. Griffith
- Written by: D. W. Griffith
- Story by: Based on the book M'liss by Bret Harte
- Produced by: Biograph Company
- Starring: Edwin August; Mary Pickford
- Cinematography: G. W. Bitzer
- Distributed by: General Film Company
- Release date: June 27, 1912
- Running time: 17 minutes
- Country: United States
- Languages: Silent; 13 English intertitles

External videos
- The School Teacher and the Waif (1912)

The School Teacher and the Waif is a 1912 American silent drama film directed by D. W. Griffith. The film was produced by the Biograph Company and distributed by the General Film Company. Starring Mary Pickford as the waif and Edwin August as the schoolteacher, the film was released by Biograph on June 27, 1912.

The story centers on Nora's struggles with loneliness, the hardships she faces at home, and the challenges she encounters at school, including bullying and feelings of humiliation. When a street vendor attempts to take advantage of her vulnerable situation, her teacher intervenes to help.

This film marked the second appearance of a 15-year-old stage actress named Ella Hall in a Biograph film. She played one of the young schoolgirls. Her part was uncredited.

== Plot ==
Title Card This movie revolves around a young country girl named Nora, played by Mary Pickford. Nora is an unassuming girl who lives on a dilapidated farm. One day, she observes two boys teasing her pet sheep and chases them away. Shortly after, she hears her father calling her inside, where he shows her a letter from the "School Commissioners" ordering her to start attending school. Despite her objections, Nora agrees to start the next day.

Title Card On her first day at school, Nora arrives to find other children playing outside. However, they stop playing when they see her, making fun of her appearance and behavior. Then the teacher says it is time to start class, prompting everyone to head indoors.

Title Card When the first lesson ends, recess begins, and once again, the children taunt Nora. Feeling disheartened, she walks to a nearby stream and begins to cry. The teacher, sensing her distress, comes over to comfort her. Nora tells him that the other kids do not understand her. He says a few kind words, gently pats her on the head, and she happily skips down the road.

Title Card As the evening sets in, a spelling bee takes place with parents and school officials watching closely while the teacher quizzes various students. When it is Nora's turn, she has a hard time spelling any words correctly. Consequently, the teacher tells her that because of her failure, she must wear a dunce cap. Nora begs the teacher not to make her wear the cap, but the teacher must follow the Spelling Bee rules. Nora gets angry, throws the cap on the ground, and storms out of the classroom in tears as she makes her way home.

Title Card Saturday arrives with Nora's father returning home in confusion before collapsing onto his bed. Moments later, he hears someone knocking at the door—it is Nora returning from school. Nora keeps knocking, but her dad ignores her and falls back asleep. Unable to wake him up, Nora wraps herself in an old gunny sack and leans against the door. As she falls asleep, it starts to rain.

Title Card On Sunday morning, realizing that his daughter had spent the night outside, he let her in so she could warm up and dry off.

Title Card After feeling humiliated in front of the class, Nora decides to skip school. She walks to the crossroads and sits by a fence post, pondering her future. Hearing some commotion nearby prompts her to take a brief stroll into the village.

Title Card Nora sees a medicine wagon and a snake-oil salesman hawking "Dr. Joe's Painkiller." The salesman has helpers: a banjo player and a pretty woman who were trying to lure people closer so that the drummer could sell his elixir. The huckster sees Nora and approaches her. Nora looks away at first, but then starts listening intently to what the faker is offering. He quickly realized how naïve she is and how easily she can be persuaded. He proposes marriage as part of his pitch to the young girl and asks her to think it over. She walks back to her favorite fencepost to consider the offer.

Title Card The next day, Nora returns to the fencepost located at the crossroads. The huckster sees her and walks over to see if Nora has thought about his proposal. He tells her again about his false promises of love and companionship. While they talked, the teacher passed by on his way to school. He pauses momentarily, then continues without intervening.

Title Card Later, Nora decides to accept his proposal. She heads home to pack her meager belongings and returns to the medicine wagon. Meanwhile, the teacher notices she was absent from the classroom and recalls the conversation he overheard at the fencepost. Concerned that Nora is naïve enough to believe the shyster, the teacher leaves the schoolchildren to their own devices and begins searching for Nora.

Title Card Back at the medicine wagon, the troupe is getting ready to leave. The teacher arrives just as Nora is about to board the wagon. He tells the peddler that he knows about his marriage proposal to Nora and would like to help. The teacher stated that he brought a minister who could perform the wedding immediately. Nora looked happy, but the salesman looked terrified. Suddenly, he makes a wild excuse, runs to his wagon, and quickly leaves the village. Nora stands in the middle of the road, feeling lost and deserted as the wagon disappears.

Title Card The teacher walks over to Nora and comforts her. They walk back to school together. They enter the classroom, and Nora takes her seat. After the lesson, the teacher dismissed everyone except Nora. He gently stroked and kissed her hair. They both smiled, happy to be together. When she leaves the school, Nora feels content.

Title Card The story ends with the teacher happily leaving the classroom.

== Cast ==
The cast for this one-reel production is substantial, with 18 known actors. This number was not unusual for a Griffith-directed picture - see article section Director. The 17 actors in this film have a collective filmography exceeding 2,000 movies. (Note: This total number of films was derived manually by adding together the published filmographies of all the actors involved in this photoplay.)

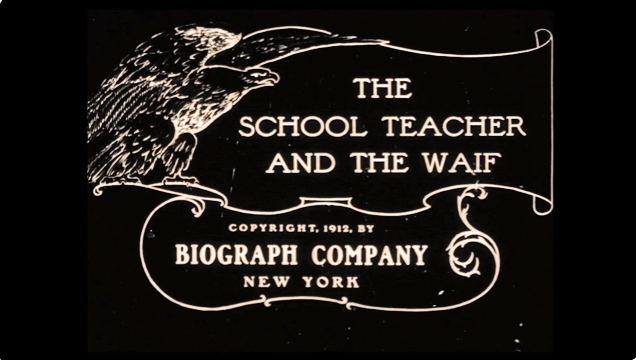
Actor	Role
Edwin August	The School Teacher	.
Mary Pickford	Nora - the Waif (Note: After debuting at Biograph, Mary Pickford also became a top star at the studio. Because of her overwhelming popularity and the fact that they didn't credit her name on-screen, Mary Pickford became recognized as one of the Biograph girls.)	.
Charles Hill Mailes	Nora's Father	.
Bert Hendler	A Street Faker (Note: Bert Hendler's character is called a street faker or fakir, depending on the media source. According to Wiktionary, either term is acceptable.: Wiktionary defines a fakir as - Someone who takes advantage of the gullible through fakery, especially of a spiritual or religious nature.; Wiktionary defines a faker as - A snake oil salesman; one who makes exaggerated claims about a product he sells.)	.
Claire McDowell	The Street Faker's Sweetheart	.
William A. Carroll	The Street Faker's Assistant	.
Robert Harron	The young schoolboy in the classroom	.
Ella Hall	Schoolgirl	.
Other actors in this picture (Note: The actor's approximate age is listed on the right) included: Jack Pickford 15, Kate Bruce 52, Josephine Crowell 53, Grace Henderson c. 52, Mae Marsh 17, Frank Opperman 51, Alfred Paget 33, Edna Foster c. 12, Lillian Hamilton 18 and Antrim Short 11. Griffith consistently sought a diverse ensemble for his acting company, and this troupe exemplifies that commitment with its blend of ages and experience. The characters played by Bobby Heron and Ella Hall are listed as unconfirmed. However, their presence in this film was verified by observation. (Note: It may seem strange that this film has no on-screen credits, yet has a public uncredited listing. Note that many studios, including Biograph Studios, did not use screen credits during this time. The belief was that giving an on-screen credit to individual actors would foster a star system thereby allowing movie fans to follow and demand to see on-screen their favorite stars. This would result in the stars requesting more compensation. Biograph paid its stars $5 to $10 dollars a week ($94 to $187 in today's money) during the period this film was made. The studios aimed to avoid a repeat of what had already occurred with stage actors. The absence of on-screen credits identifying Griffith as the director would become a factor in Griffith's departure from Biograph.—see #Director.)

== Production ==
The Biograph Company, also known as the American Mutoscope and Biograph Company, was a leading studio during the silent era. (Note: The Biograph Company was founded in 1895 and was active until 1916. It was the first company in the United States devoted entirely to film production and exhibition, and for two decades was among the most prolific, releasing over 3,000 short films and 12 feature films.)Biograph was instrumental in the careers of both Griffith and Pickford, providing a platform for their early works

=== Pre production ===
==== Casting ====
These brief casting backgrounds only display prominent players in this production.

- Edwin August (née Edwin August Phillip von der Butz) a.k.a. Eddie, Montague Lawrence (November 10, 1883 – March 4, 1964) was an American actor from St. Louis, Missouri. August was 28 years old when Griffith offered him the lead role of The Schoolteacher.

August began his career in local Repertory theatre companies, performing around the St. Louis area. He later relocated to New York City and started performing on Broadway. Having enjoyed success on legitimate stage, he joined the early film industry. August started acting in films with the Edison Company in 1908. Following his success with the Biograph Company, he continued taking leading roles until 1918. Later in his career, he accepted supporting roles, then became a movie extra until 1947. Between 1909 and 1947, he appeared in 150 films.

- Mary Pickford (née Gladys Louise Smith) a.k.a. America's Sweetheart (April 8, 1892 – May 29, 1979) was a Canadian American film actress. Pickford was 20 when she became the lead actress in this production playing the role of Nora - the Waif.

Pickford began her film career in 1909 with the Edison Company, later becoming Hollywood's first millionaire by 1916 1912 would be her last year with Biograph before she left for movie superstardom elsewhere. She would become a significant figure in the development of film acting and is credited with defining the ingénue type in cinema. Pickford would become one of the most popular actresses of the silent film era and earn the Sobriquet of "America's Sweetheart". Her Hollywood career spanned five decades,

- Charles Hill Mailes (a.k.a.Charlees Mailes, Charles H. Mailles) (May 25, 1870 – February 17, 1937) was a Canadian actor from Halifax, Nova Scotia, Canada. The actor was 42 when he accepted the role as Nora's neglectful father. He was active in films from 1909 to 1935. His wife was silent-screen actress Claire McDowell. They were married from 1906 until his death in 1937.

The pair worked together in this movie and continued collaborating in other films. In Hollywood, California, McDowell died on October 23, 1966.

- Bert Hendler (née Herschel Henlere) a.k.a. Herschel Henler (December 14, 1890 – January 13, 1968) was a Canadian vaudevillian from Galt, Ontario Canada. Hendler was 21 years-old when he acted as the Snake oil salesman in this production. His character is the one who offers to marry Mary Pickford's character, - the waif. As Bert Handler, he only appeared in three Biograph Griffin films in 1912. In addition to this film, he also appeared in A Temporary Truce and An Indian Summer, a 1912 American short film starring Mary Pickford. While appearing on the vaudeville stage, he billed himself as - the poet of the piano.
- Claire McDowell (née MacDowell) (a.k.a.Claire MacDowell, Clare McDowell, Doris Carlton) (November 2, 1877 – October 23, 1966) was an American actress from New York City. The actress was 34 when she accepted the role of the Street Faker's Sweetheart. At the time of this filming, McDowell was a regular at Biograph, favoring the group work of Biograph's actors while shunning top billing. She was one of the most adaptable of Griffith's actors at the time.

Her film career started at 30 in 1908, a late start for that era. At 35, she was at the peak of her career at Biograph Films. She stayed at Biograph until 1916, then moved to Universal, and later joined MGM in the mid-1920s. She was active in the movie industry and appeared in 350 films between 1908 and 1945. Most of Claire McDowell's film career was spent as a supporting actress.

Her husband was a silent-screen actor Charles Hill Mailes, and they were married from 1906 until he died in 1937. The pair worked together in this movie and continued collaborating in other films. In Hollywood, California, McDowell died on October 23, 1966.

- William A. Carroll a.k.a. Bill Carroll (January 9, 1875 – January 26, 1928) was an American actor from Manhattan, New York City. Carroll was 37 years-old when he acted as the Street Faker's Assistant. In the film, his Blackface act attracts prospective clients to the medicine wagon with banjo music and dance. Once he has them engaged, the Snake oil Salesman, Bert Hendler, can peddle his magical elixir.

Carroll enters the motion picture industry via the Selig and Vitagraph film companies. Carroll appeared in 140 films between 1911 and 1927.

- Robert Harron (née Robert Emmett Harron) a.k.a. Bobby Herron (April 12, 1893 – September 5, 1920) was an American actor from New York City. Herron was 19 years-old when Griffith offered him the uncredited role of older boy in the classroom of the school teacher

He got his start in the entertainment industry on the live stage in 1907. Although he appeared in over 200 films, he is perhaps best remembered for his roles in the D.W. Griffith directed films The Birth of a Nation (1915) and Intolerance (1916). He would die at the young age of 27 after a hotel shooting incident in New York City. Herron also had a younger brother, John, who would follow his lead into the acting business.

- Ella Hall née Ella Augusta Hall (March 17, 1897 – September 3, 1981) was an American actress from Hoboken, New Jersey. The film was her second for Biograph after leaving the stage. She was 16 when she had an uncredited role in this film, playing a student. She was active from 1912 to 1933, and ultimately made 97 films. Following an uncredited role in the 1923 production of The Dutchman, Hall retired from silent movies to focus on her sons and her troubled marriage to Emory Johnson.

==== Director ====
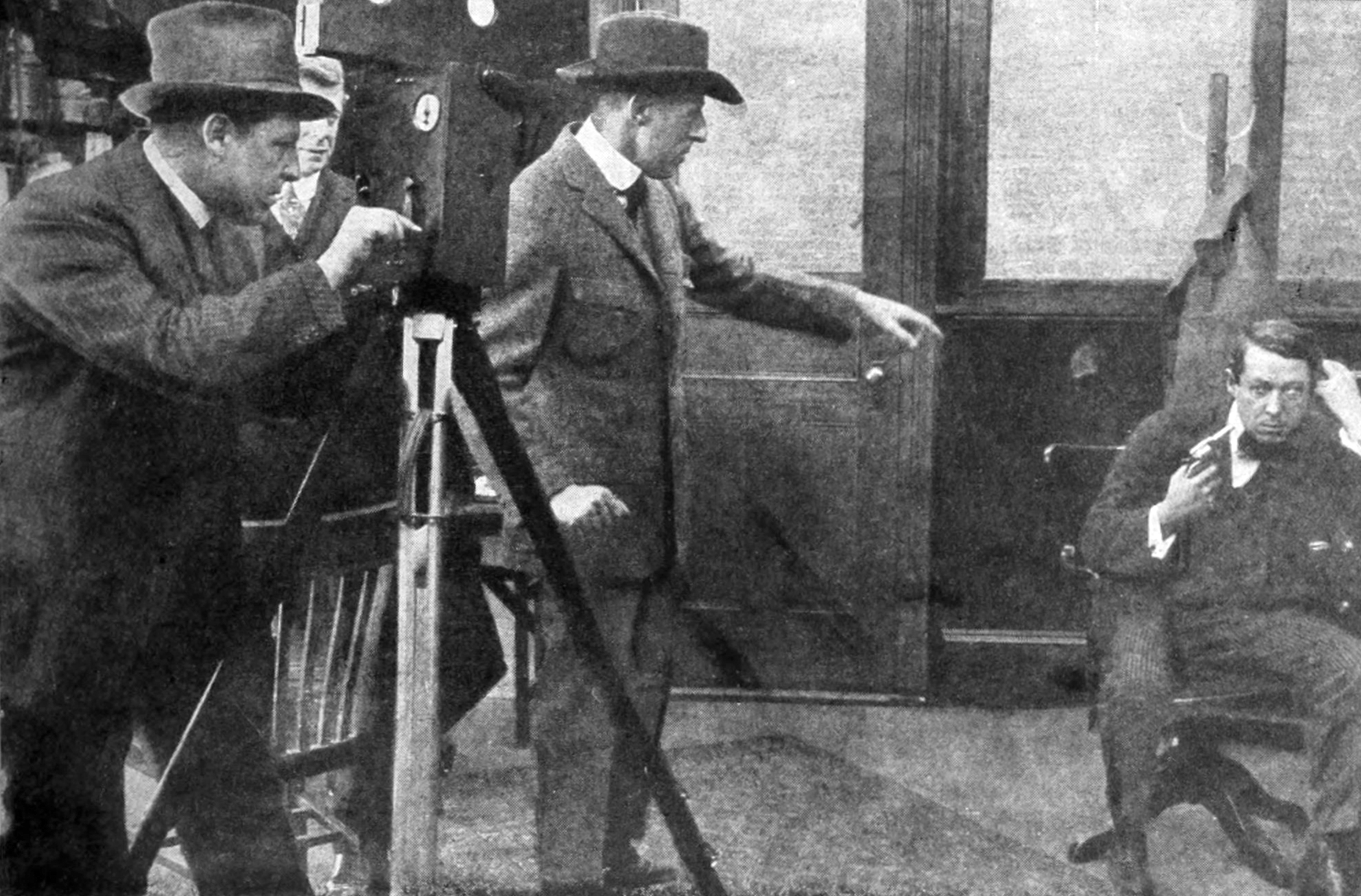
Billy Bitzer (Note: Billy Blitzer is using his favorite Pathe camera to shoot this scene from a different movie) and Griffith c. 1913

David Llewelyn Wark Griffith a.k.a. D. W. Griffith, Lawrence Griffith, Larry Griffith (Note: According to the AFI Catelog he also used the following pen names - Irene Sinclair, Marquis de Trolignac, M. Gaston de Tolignac, Granville Warwick, Roy Sinclair) (January 22, 1875 – July 23, 1948) was an American film director born in Floyds Fork Kentucky. (Note: Other birthplaces are listed as: "on a farm in Oldham County, KY;" Crestwood, KY; La Grange, KY) Griffith was 37 years-old when he directed this production.

In the 1890s, Griffith was working as a stage actor, touring with regional stock companies while writing a series of unsuccessful plays. In 1908, he sought employment with the American Mutoscope and Biograph Company in New York City, where they hired him as a stage extra. Midway through 1908, Biograph sought a new director and promoted Griffith to that role. His debut film, The Adventures of Dollie, proved so popular that Griffith stayed on as director. By the end of 1908, he had completed directing 48 short films. Between 1908 and 1913, Griffith made 450 films for Biograph; most were one-reel productions, averaging about 12 minutes each.

Griffith left Biograph in October 1913 to join Mutual Film Corporation after becoming dissatisfied with Biograph's refusal to raise budgets or implement onscreen film credits for filmmakers. Additionally, Biograph criticized his frequent use of too many actors in his films and rejected his proposals to begin producing feature-length films. Griffith's departure and the subsequent loss of key employees contributed to Biograph's decline and bankruptcy within just two years.

==== Screenplay ====
"David never used a script, and a sub-title never was written until he was convinced that one was necessary to elucidate a situation."

— Linda Arvidson in 1925
Griffith's first wife

When Griffith arrived at Biograph, the studio already had a story department led by Lee Dougherty and with an in-house writer, Stanner E.V. Taylor. Although the director was empowered to buy story ideas, Griffith never had full control over the topics of Biograph movies. Note there are key differences between stories and Scenarios: a scenario is a sequence of events used for planning, while a story is a complete narrative with emotional depth that explores character motivations.

Griffith noted that the scenes' complex arrangement was kept in his head rather than following a formal script. Biograph provided its directors with scenarios, but Griffith never used them, making his approach distinct from that of other directors. According to Griffith, the dynamics of the scene informed his subsequent shots instead of following a formal script. Griffith's associates have always said he didn't use a written script, but he kept complicated shot structures entirely in his head. You can find a more comprehensive discussion of Griffith's camera work and scene construction in the book, D.W. Griffith and the Biograph Company.

Various Biograph scripts are also available for download at the Library of Congress.

=== Filming ===
==== Location ====
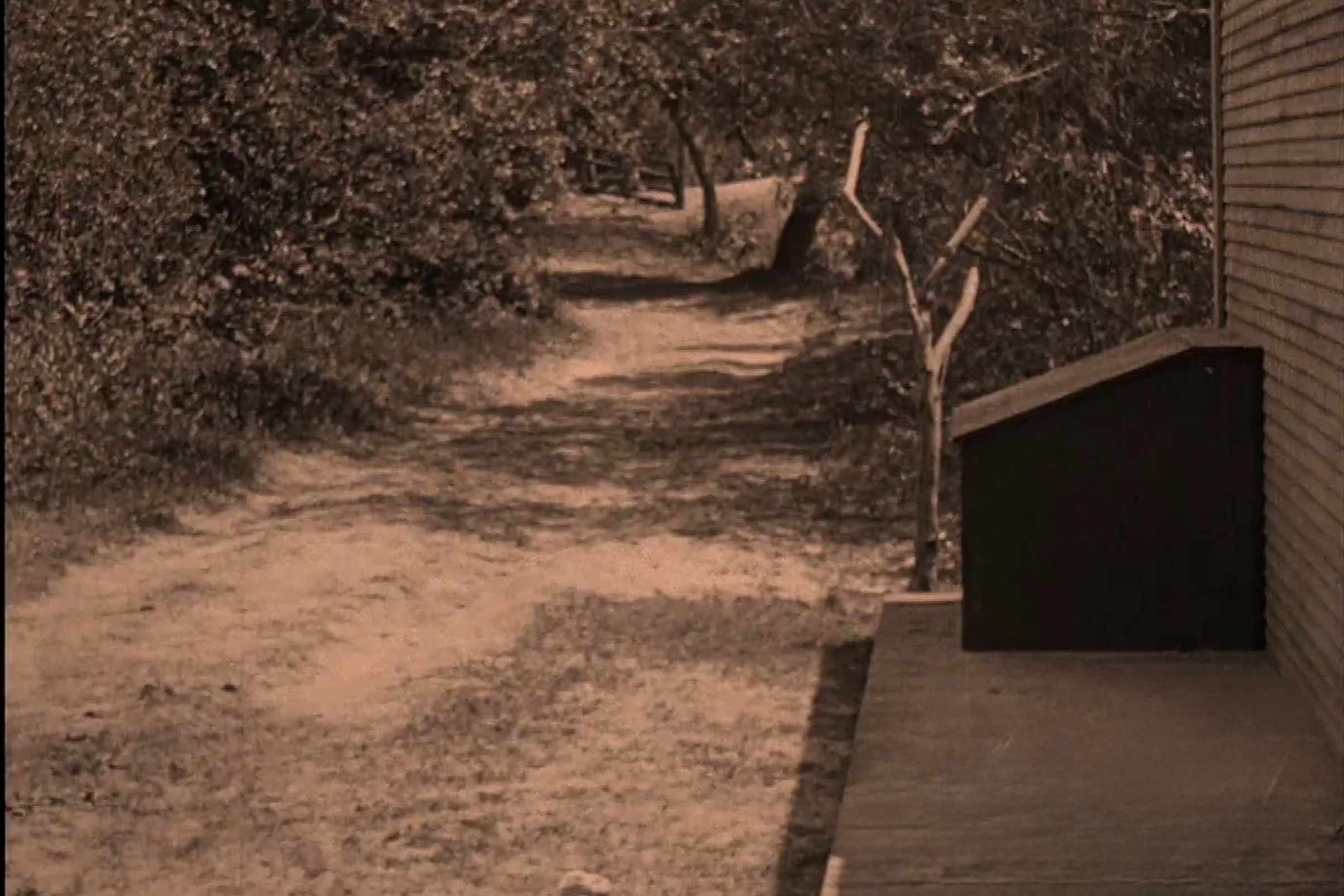
Outside of the School House

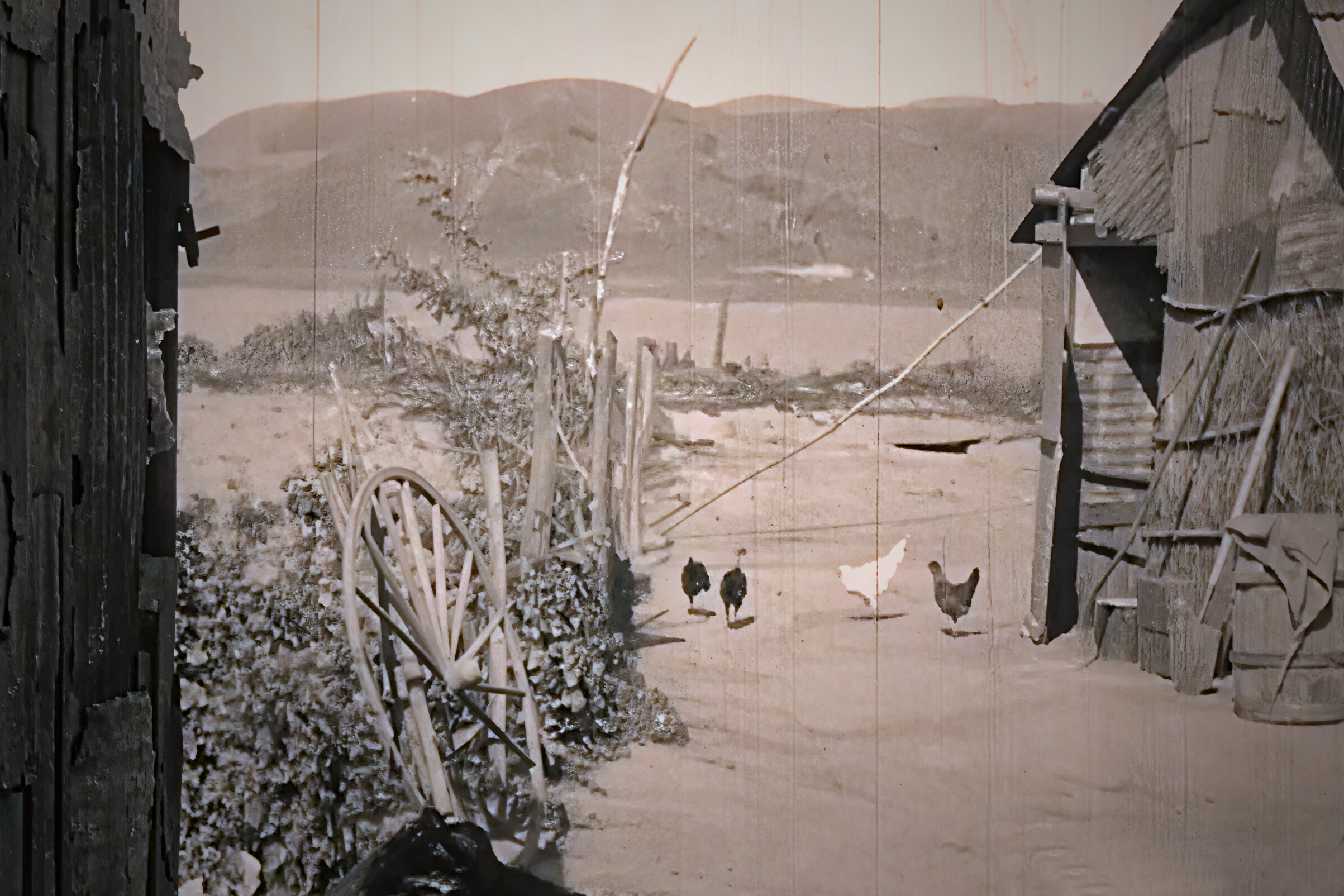
Nora's Farm

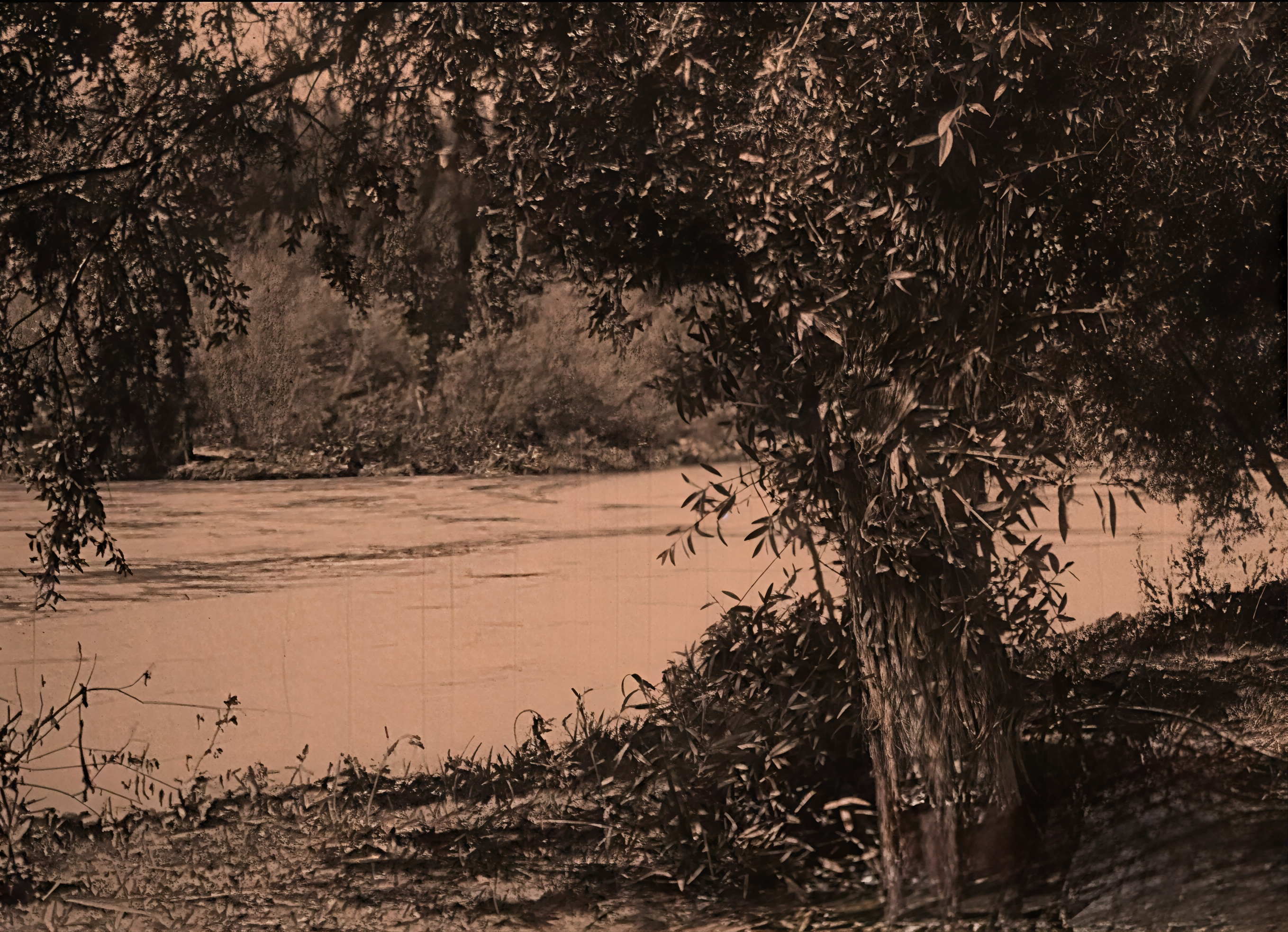
Backyard of school

This motion picture venue is listed simply as "California." While the exact filming location within the state is unknown, all available sources consistently identify California as the site. Beginning in 1910, Biograph sought to establish a presence in California. Biograph aimed to position itself as a major force in Los Angeles filmmaking and played a significant role in the early establishment of Hollywood.

=== Post production ===
==== Editing ====
Film scholar Albert Fulton states in his book Motion pictures: The development of an art from silent films to the age of television:

Griffith ... was his own editor. It is difficult to imagine how his films could have been edited otherwise, for not only did he shoot his pictures without a prepared script, but only he knew how the parts were to be fitted together.

Britannica's Robert Henderson (Note: Chief, General Library and Museum of the Performing Arts, New York Public Library at Lincoln Center, New York City. Author of D.W. Griffith, His Life and Times, and others.) mentions in his book, D.W. Griffith: The Years at Biograph,

"Griffith had indeed been responsible for the editing of his own films, and he had also relied on improvisation from a plot outline, a synopsis or scenario, committed to memory. There was no detailed shooting script, and there was no theory of editorial process to guide the development of the production."

==== Running time ====
Nearly all published accounts state that this film's footage is exactly 1,000 feet, or one reel. Each reel is estimated to be 10 to 17 minutes long. Note that the video on YouTube runs for 17 minutes.

==== Copyright ====
Copyright filed with Library of Congress Copyright Office.

THE SCHOOL TEACHER AND THE WAIF.
© Biograph Co.; 1c 10July1912; J170957.

==== Technical aspects ====
Type	Value
Aspect ratio	1.33 : 1
Frame rate	16-18 frames per second (fps)
Film Color	Black and white
Gauge	35mm spherical
Length	1,000 feet (300 m)
Reel(s)	one
Runtime	17 minutes Short film
Sound mix	Silent
Stock	Cellulose nitrate

In 1912, the technical specifications for professional films were standardizing around the hand-cranked speed of approximately 16 frames per second (fps). (Note: Even though "The School Teacher and the Waif" had a runtime of 17 minutes, it was categorized as a one-reeler. You might ask how a 1,000-foot film reel could go longer than 11 minutes! In the 1910s, silent films were generally shot at 16 frames per second (fps) so that a 1,000-foot roll could hold 16 to 17 minutes of footage. Yet with the switch to sound, the frame rate increased to 24 fps, requiring more footage to deliver the same duration of motion. At this new speed, an 11-minute segment would swallow up a full 1,000-foot reel.) Films were almost universally shot in black and white, were silent, and had a typical 4:3 aspect ratio

If a reader desires a comprehensive examination of the photographic methods utilized, scene by scene, by Griffith and his cameraman Billy Bitzer, they can consult the technical perspectives offered by André Gaudreault in the book The Griffith Project, Volume 6: Films Produced in 1912.

== Release and reception ==
Once you've set your "peepers" on it you'll feel the smiles slipping and the chuckles gurgling in spite of yourself– A really delightful comedy, and it's a Biograph. — Newspaper Ad for film dated October 18, 1912,

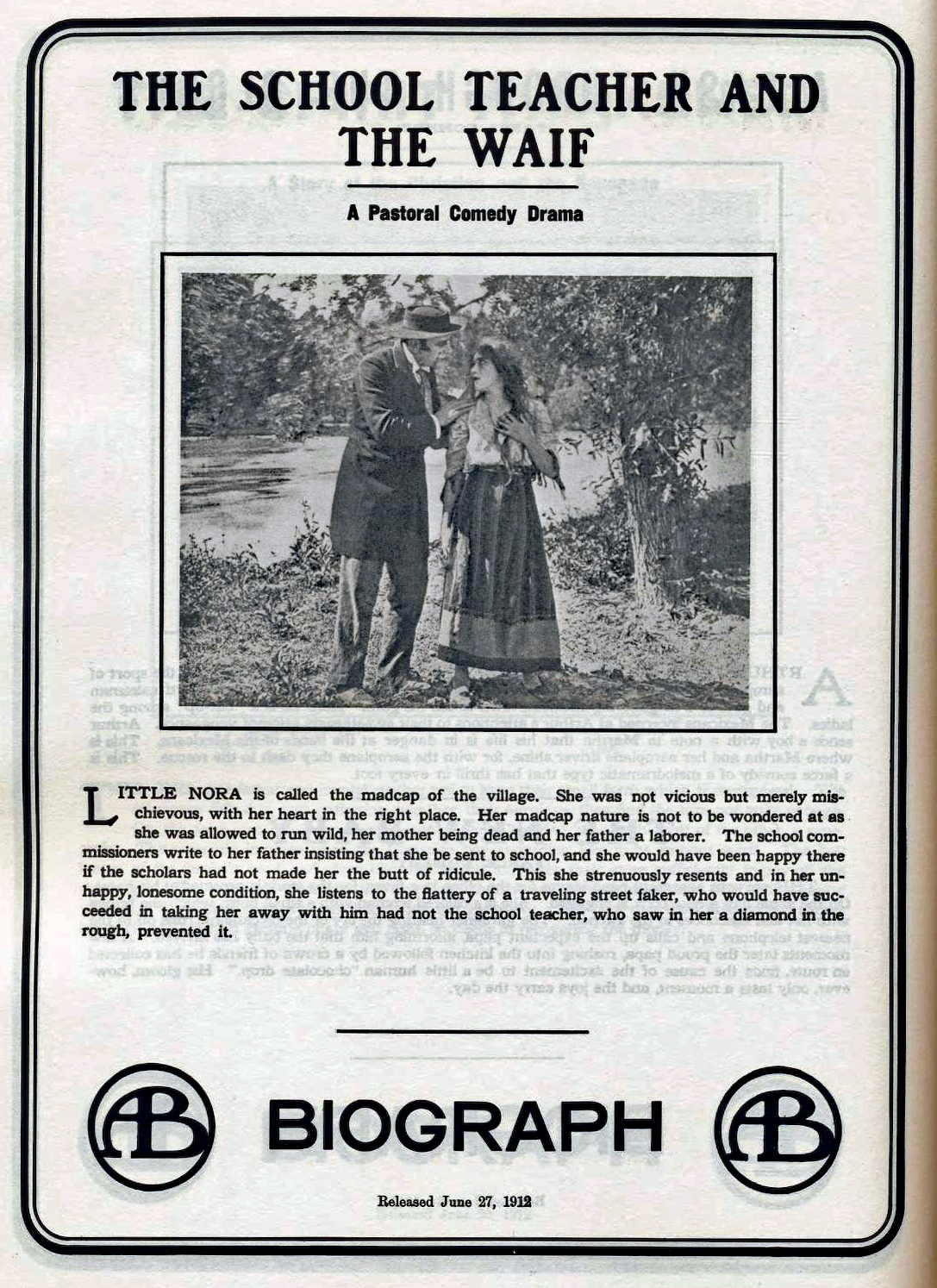
Biograph Bulletin Mag Movie Ad

=== Official release ===
The one-reel short was released to U.S. theaters on Thursday, June 27, 1912. Biograph films were always released on Mondays or Thursdays in 1912.
The film was released in the United Kingdom on August 25, 1912.

=== Advertising ===
During this early period in the history of filmmaking, full-page advertisements for short films in trade journals were uncommon. A full-page ad appears in Biograph's own trade journal, but the page reads more like a statement than an ad, hoping to draw audiences to the theater. Significant publicity for films would emerge when feature movies become more the norm.

=== Reviews ===
==== Critical response ====
Movie reviews were critical opinions for theater owners and fans. Critiques of movies printed in different trade journals and newspapers were vital in determining whether to book or watch the movie.

- The movie editor of The Morning Star newspaper reviewed the movie in the July 6, 1912 issue as follows:
  "What has been pronounced by critics and the National Board of Censors as the best film the Biograph Company has ever manufactured is on the bill for today. It is "The School Teacher and the Waif'" and it breathes of the sweetness and freedom of country life, into which the ways of the city are suddenly thrust. It is a pastoral comedy of beautiful nature and besides furnishing wholesome amusement it teaches a tender, timely lesson."
- The motion picture reviewer in the July 6, 1912 issue of the Moving Picture World stated:
  "In the way the changing situation is developed, and in the quality of the acting, there is much Biograph atmosphere, but while part is as fine as can be, parts (the schoolhouse scenes), are very conventional. The waif is a praiseworthy bit of work; the school teacher is disappointing. As a whole, for its story, for its human nature, and for its scene-making, including photography, we commend it as an excellent offering. It will please."

==== Audience response ====
- The newspaper published this theater owner's review on July 23, 1912:
  "The School Teacher and the Waif is one of the best Biograph offerings in months, in which little Mary Pickford appears in one of the best roles since she has returned to the Biograph company. It is a story of present-day life, and is an interest to everybody."
- The foreign theater owner was also impressed with the film:
  "Williams feature films, a very, pretty American drama, school teacher, and the waif, was included in the program of movie pictures submitted before a fair house at his Majesty's theater last night. It was set in a rough country scenery, and the little girls wildlife was strongly pictured."

=== Contentious issues ===
Some content in this film could offend modern audiences.

- William A. Carroll portrays the charlatan's assistant. He performs music and dance in blackface, hoping to attract a larger audience for the huckster to peddle his elixir. He is playing a banjo, a key instrument in African American music and rural folk traditions. Although a performer using blackface would be considered offensive today, it was regarded as normal and socially acceptable at the time this film was made. By the conclusion of the 20th century, audiences viewed performers in blackface as offensive, disrespectful, and fundamentally racist.
- David Mayer, professor in the Department of Drama, University of Manchester, argues in Chapter 7 of his book - A Companion to D. W. Griffith:
  "To us, this drama may have dark undertones of pedophilia, child abuse, or at best, inappropriate teacher behavior, but most early twentieth-century film audiences would have instantly recognized the narrative as an abridged and not conspicuously subtle adaptation of Clay Greene and A. S. Thompson long-standing stage comedy M'liss, Child of the Sierras, itself a theatrical rendering of a Bret Harte short story."

== Preservation status ==
According to the UCLA Film & Television Archive, a complete copy of this film exists. A 35mm duplicate negative Print exists in the Mary Pickford Institute for Film Education film collection. Another copy, 16mm preservation reduction positive, exist in the Library of Congress film archive.

== Gallery ==
Players
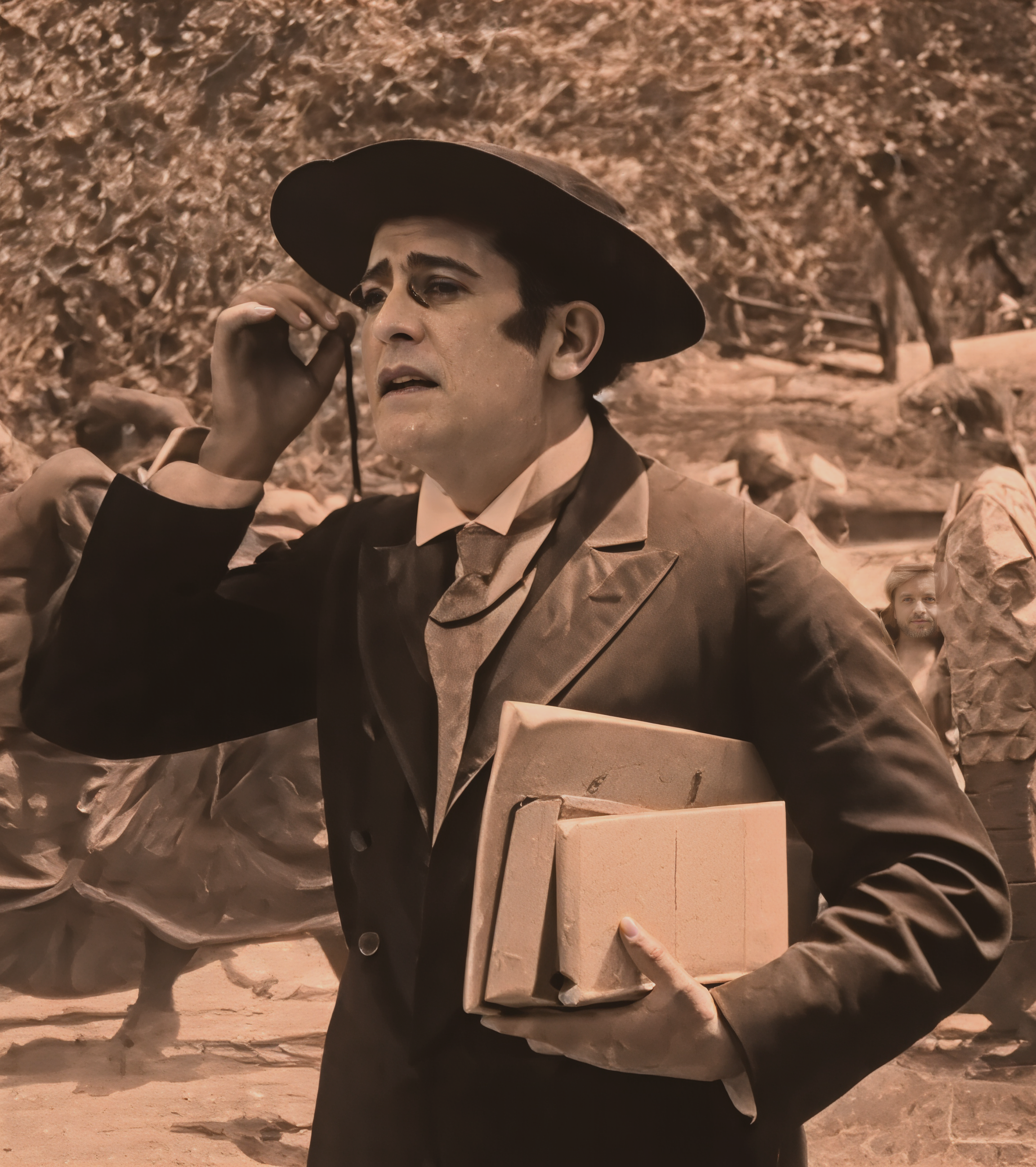
Edwin August
The School Teacher

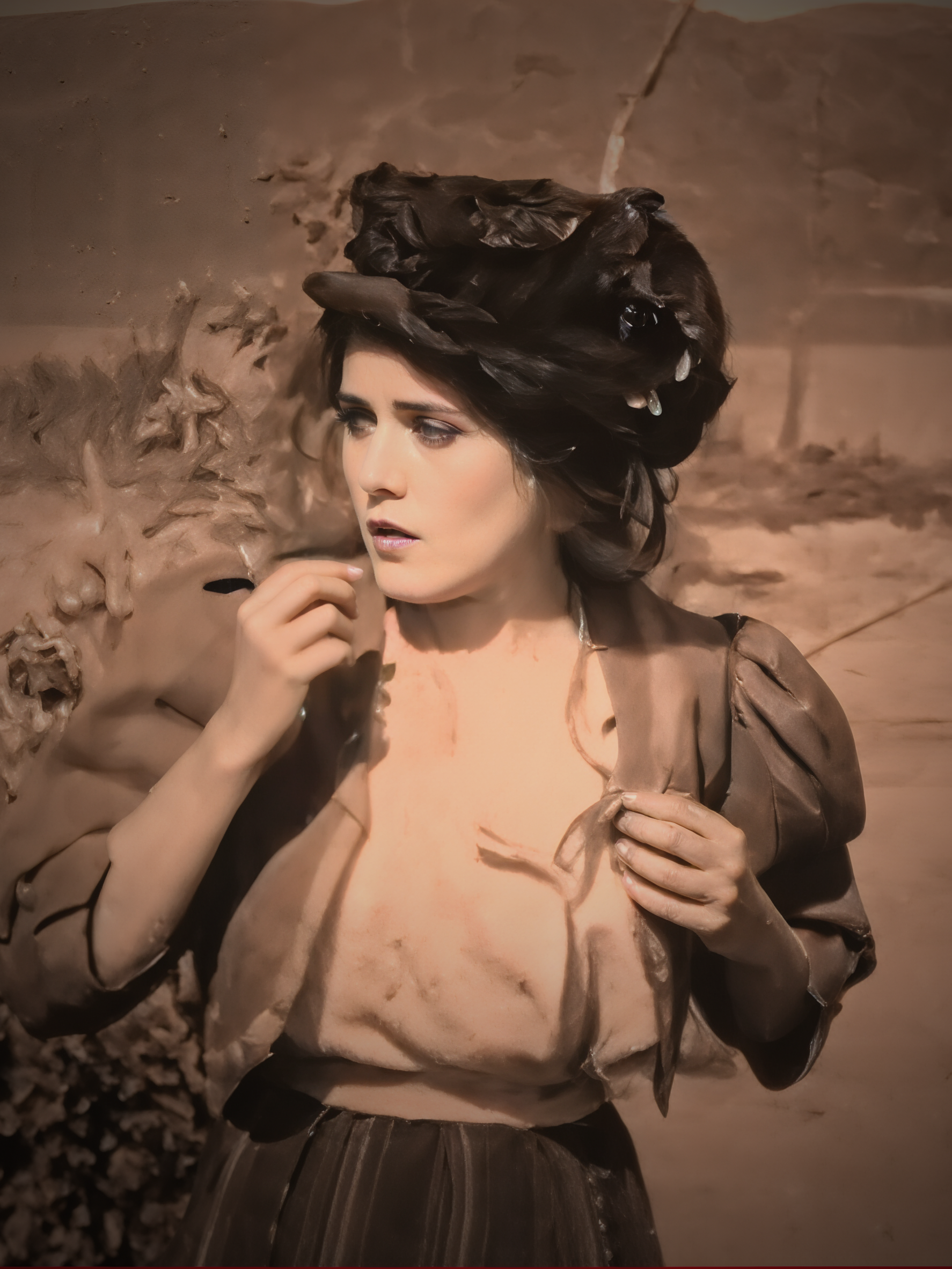
Mary Pickford
Nora - the Waif

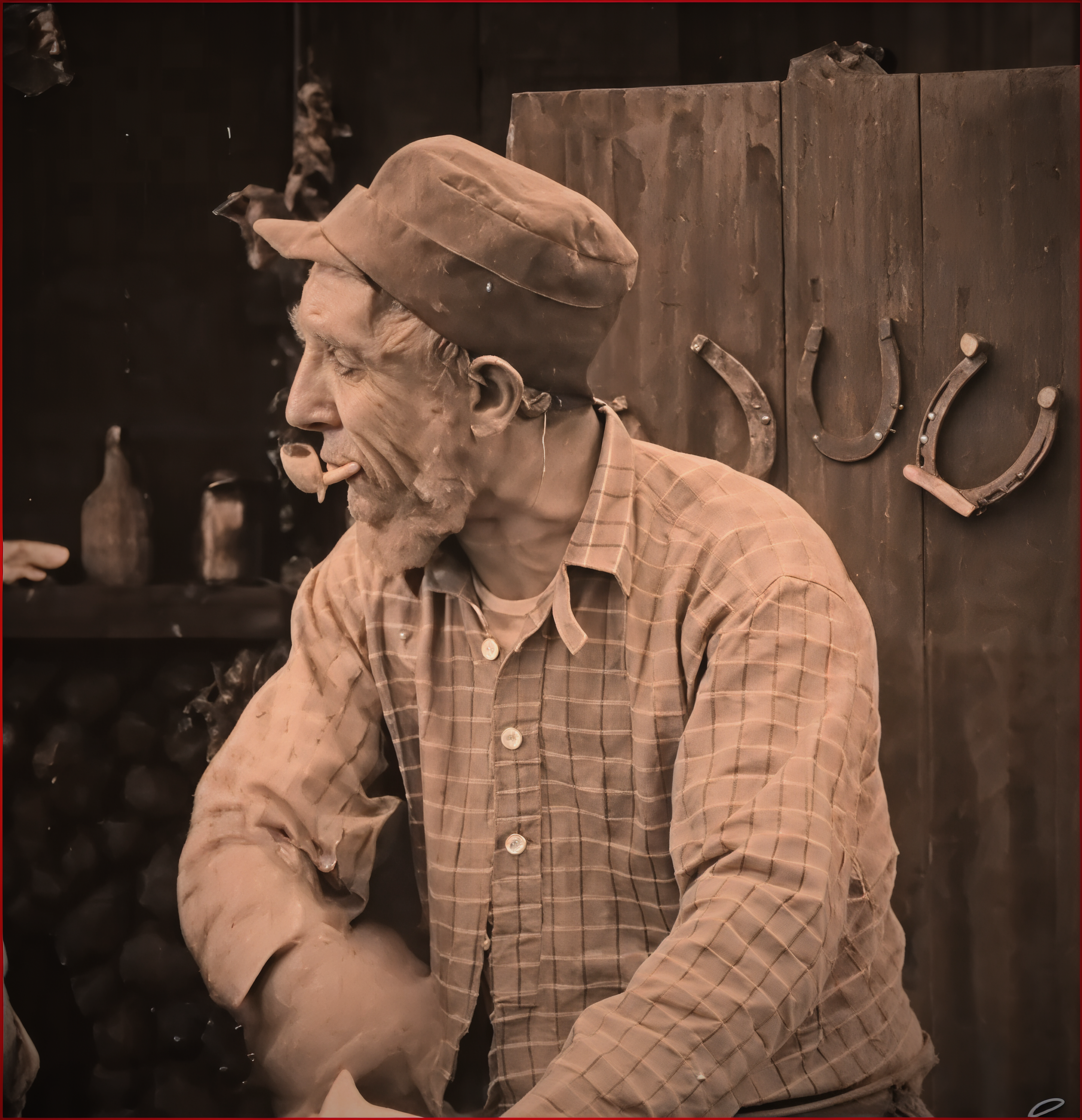
Charles Hill Mailes
Nora's father

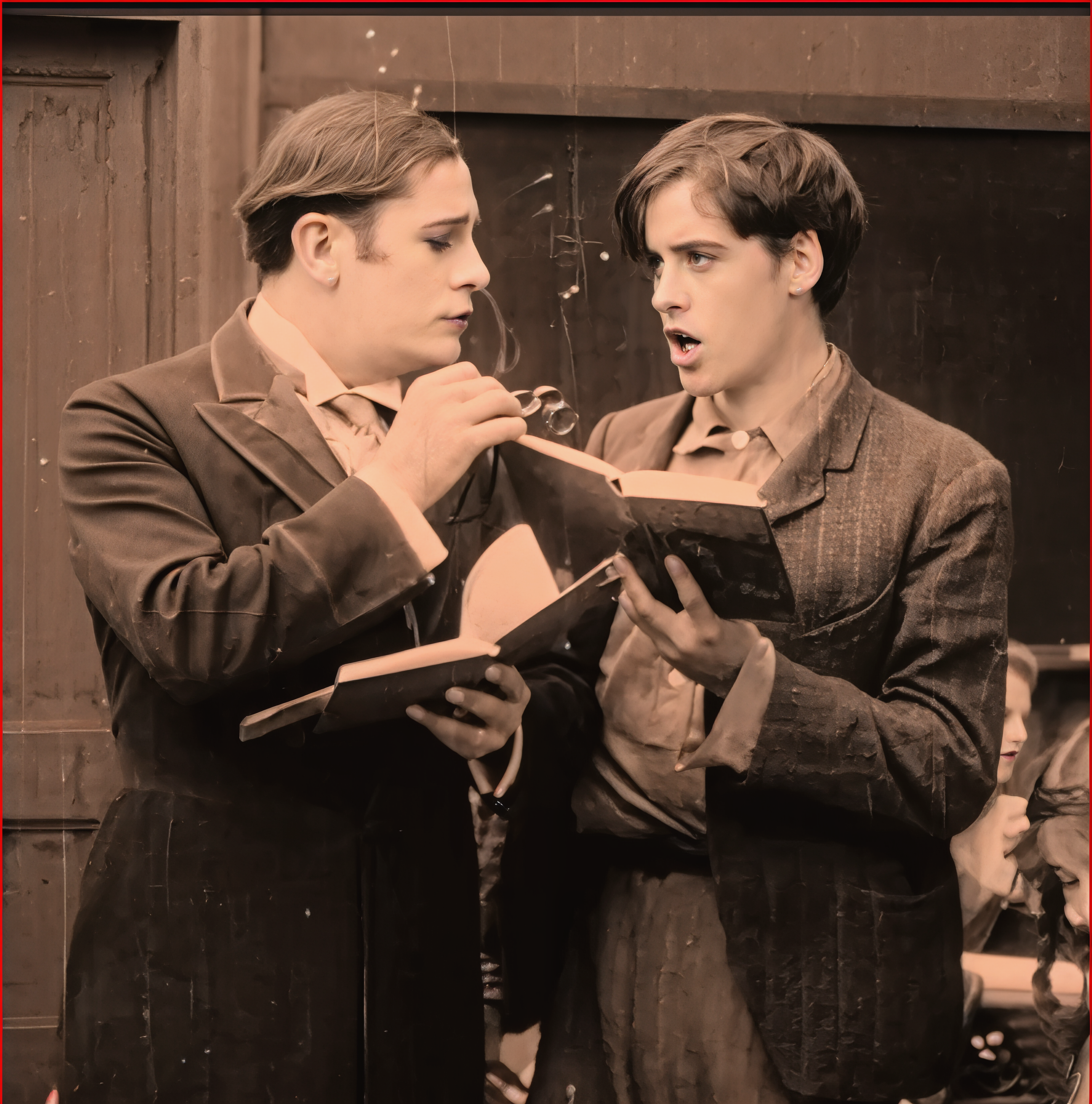
Robert Harron
The Young school boy

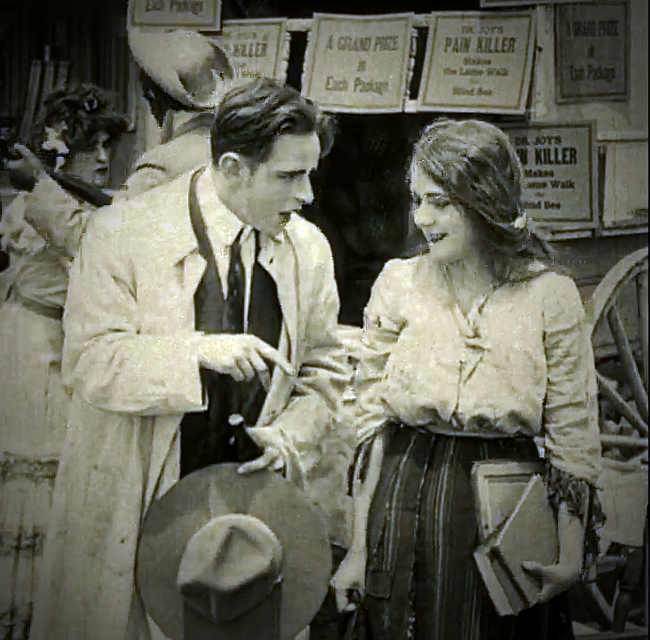
Bert Hendler
The Huckster and Nora

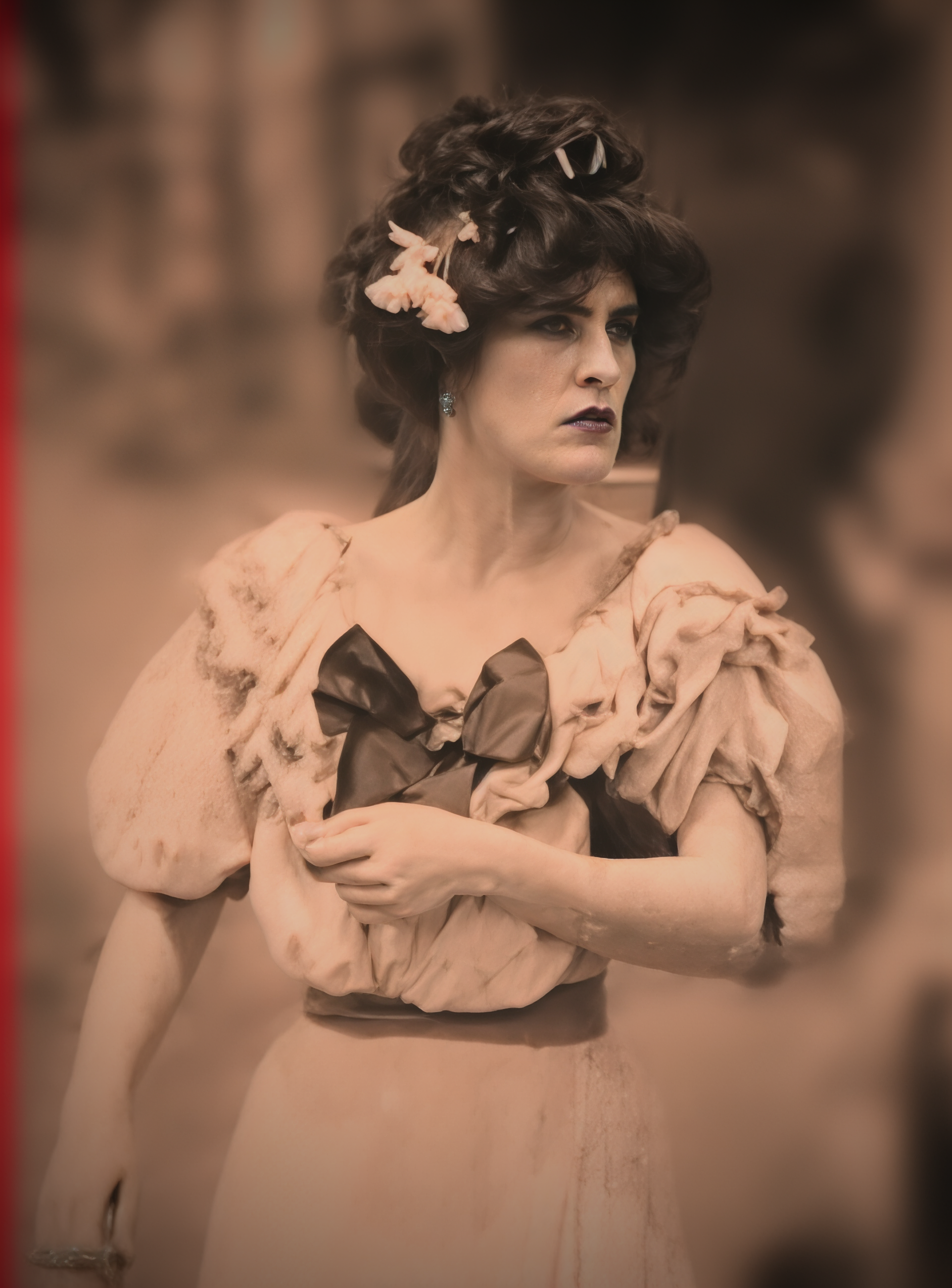
Claire McDowell
The Street Faker's Sweetheart

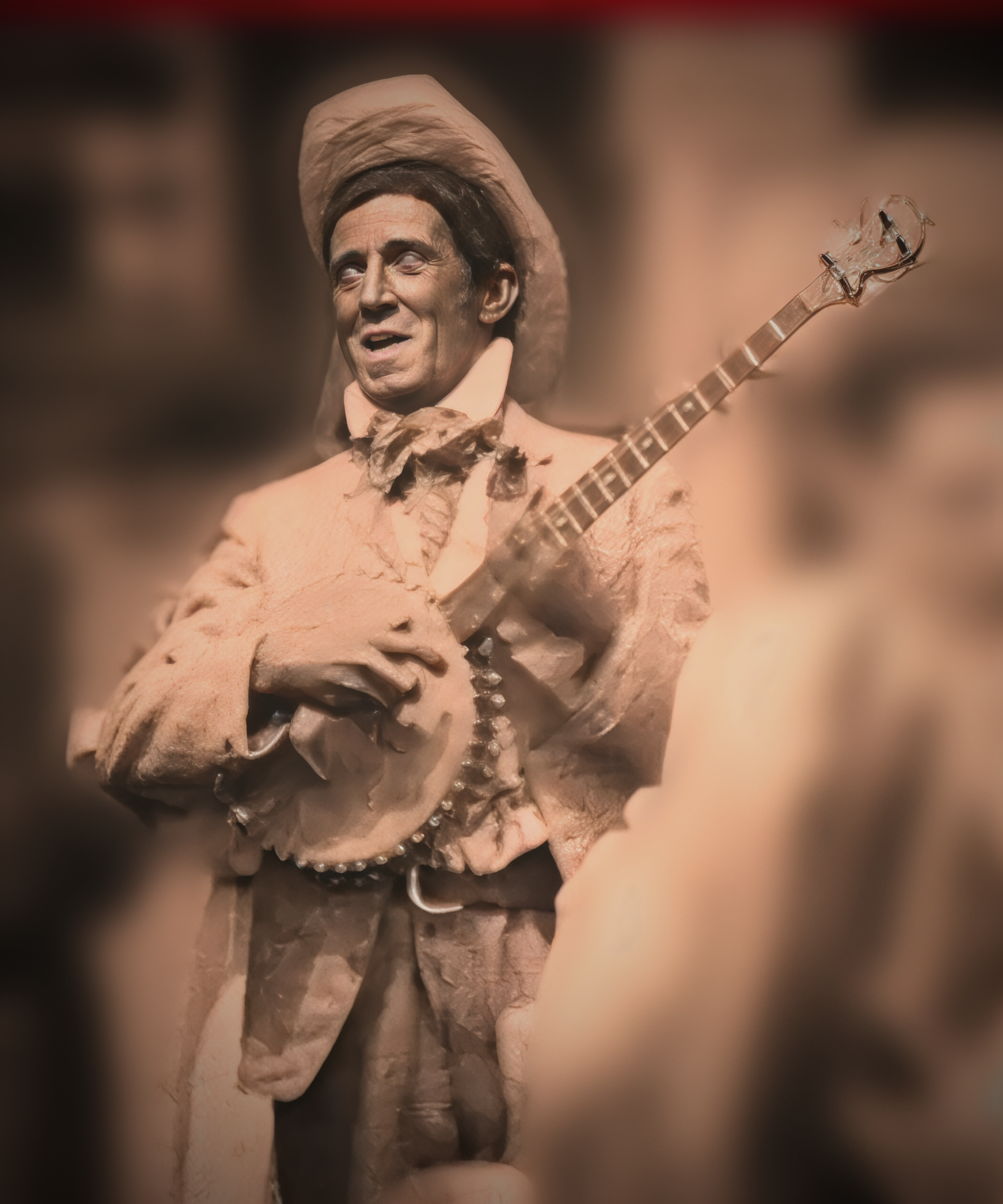
William A. Carroll
The Street Faker's Assistant

== Glossary ==
◆ This glossary provides definitions for common terms used to describe this film ◆
Term	Definition
Blackface	The practice in which a nonblack person blackens their face using theatrical makeup in order to portray a caricature of a black person.
Drummer	hawker, peddler
Faker	A snake oil salesman; one who makes exaggerated claims about a product he sells
Fakir	Someone who takes advantage of the gullible through fakery, especially of a spiritual or religious nature.
Harem-scarem	wild, careless, irresponsible
Huckster	One who deceptively sells fraudulent products; snake oil salesman
Madcap	A person who acts in a capricious, impulsive, or reckless manner.
Medicine Wagon	Medicine shows were touring acts (traveling by truck, horse, or wagon teams) that peddled "miracle cure" patent medicines and other products between various entertainments.
Sharpers	A swindler; a cheat; a professional gambler who makes his living by cheating.
Shyster	ASomeone who acts in a disreputable, unethical, or unscrupulous way.
Snakeoil	Any product with exaggerated marketing but questionable or unverifiable quality
snake oil liniment	Snake oil liniment refers to a fraudulent cure-all product popularized in the late 19th century,
Snakeoil Salesman	A swindler or grifter who sells worthless or fraudulent remedies, cures, or solutions such as snake oil, often an aggressive or showy manner.
Swindlers	A person who swindles, cheats or defrauds

== Bibliography ==
- Arvidson, Linda (1925). When the Movies Were Young. E. P. Dutton. "Linda Arvidson was D.W.Griffith first wife"
- Fulton, Albert Rondthaler (1963). Motion pictures: the development of an art from silent films to the age of television. University of Oklahoma Press.
- Graham, Cooper C. (1985). D.W. Griffith and the Biograph Company (Scarecrow Filmmakers Series). Bloomsbury Academic. ISBN 978-0-8108-1806-4.
- Henderson, Robert M. (1971). D.W. Griffith: The Years at Biograph. Secker and Warburg. ISBN 978-0-436-19265-4.
- Katz, Ephraim; Nolen, Ronald Dean (February 26, 2013). The Film Encyclopedia: The Complete Guide to Film and the Film Industry. Harper Collins. ISBN 978-0-06-227711-4.
- Kawin, Bruce (January 17, 1992). How Movies Work. University of California Press. ISBN 978-0-520-07696-9. Archived from the original on October 26, 2025.
- Keil, Charles (December 6, 2017). A Companion to D. W. Griffith. John Wiley & Sons. ISBN 978-1-118-34122-3.
- Lauritzen, Einar; Lundquist, Gunnar (1976). American Film-Index 1908–1915: Motion Pictures, July 1908 – December 1915. distributed by Akademiebokhandeln, University of Stockholm. Stockholm: Film-Index. ISBN 91-7410-001-7.
- Savade, Elias (1995). The American Film Institute Catalog of Motion Pictures Produced in the United States: Film Beginnings, 1893–1910 — A Work in Progress: v. A. Scarecrow Press. ISBN 0-8108-3021-3.
- Usai, Paolo Cherchi (July 25, 2019). The Griffith Project - Volume 5: Films Produced in 1911, Volume 6: Films Produced in 1912. Bloomsbury Publishing. pp. 75–77. ISBN 978-1-83902-014-8.
