= Mickey McBan =

American actor

- Born: February 27, 1919; Spokane, Washington, US
- Died: October 30, 1979 (aged 60); Los Angeles, California, US
- Occupation: Actor
- Years active: 1923–1929

Mickey McBan (February 27, 1919 – October 30, 1979) was an American child actor. He was born in Spokane, Washington to British theatrical parents. McBan began his acting career at the age of four in Poor Men's Wives and specialized in portraying the everyday youngster in many films. In The Moving Picture Boy, John Holmstrom describes him as "mid-way between Jackie Cooper and John Howard Davies: mousier than the one, spunkier than the other, with an amused, reassuring expression." McBan never made the transition to portraying adults and his screen career was already over by 1929.

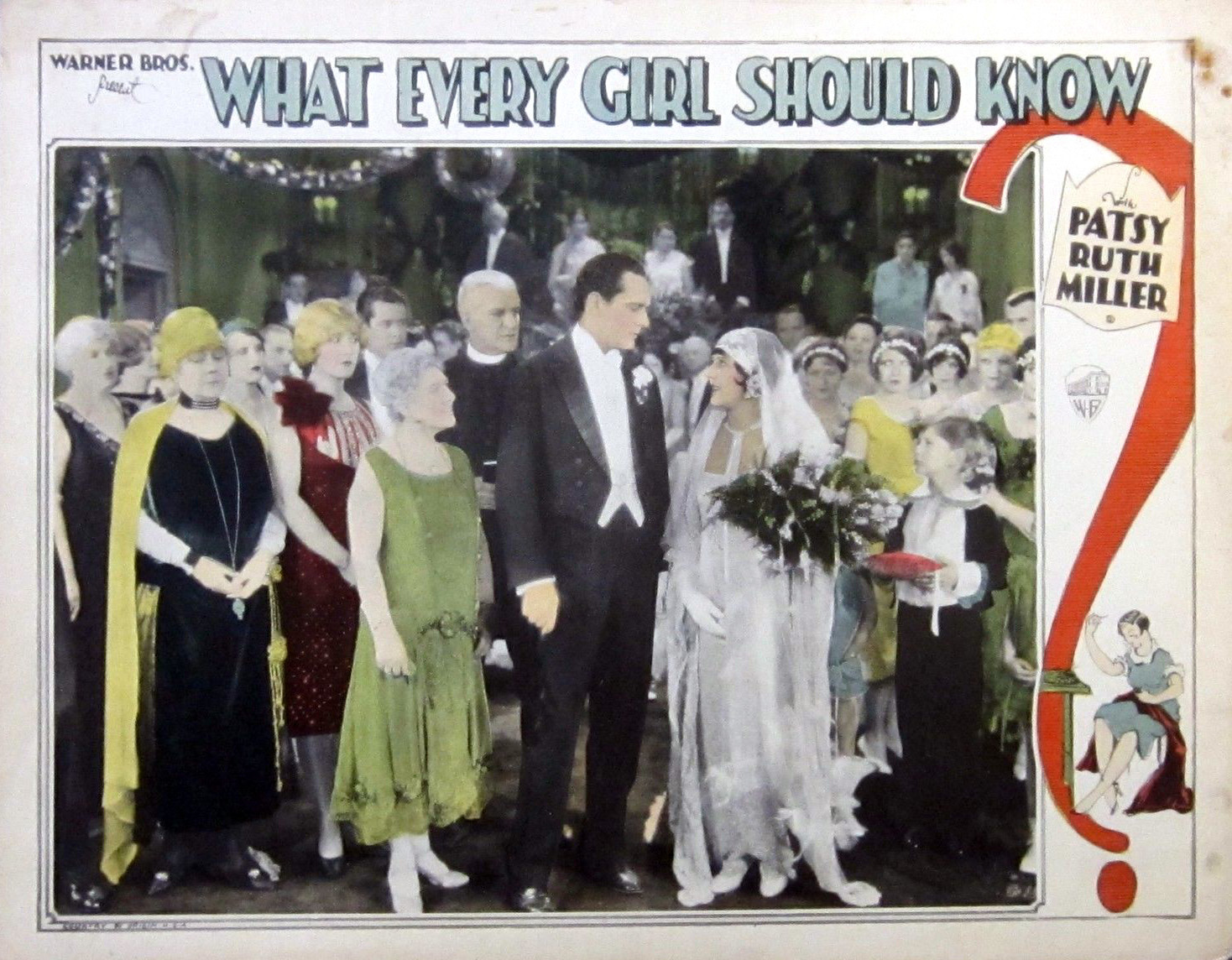
Lobby card for What Every Girl Should Know

== Partial filmography ==
- Poor Men's Wives (1923)
- Daytime Wives (1923)
- Not a Drum Was Heard (1924)
- The Dawn of a Tomorrow (1924)
- Untamed Youth (1924)
- Hot Water (1924)
- Peter Pan (1924)
- The Unholy Three (1925)
- The Splendid Road (1925)
- The Splendid Crime (1926)
- Somebody's Mother (1926)
- Beau Geste (1926)
- Moonland (1926)
- The Return of Peter Grimm (1926)
- The Way of All Flesh (1927)
- What Every Girl Should Know (1927)
- Sorrell and Son (1927)
- Laugh, Clown, Laugh (1928)
- Father and Son (1929)
