= Josephine Crowell =

Canadian actress (1859–1932)

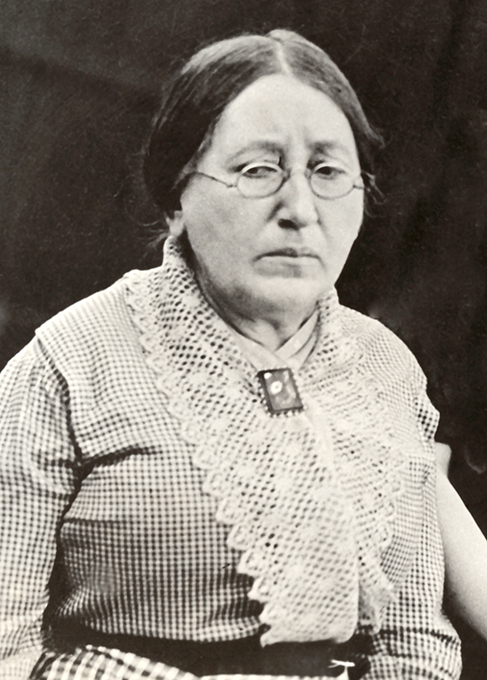
- Crowell in 1914
- Born: Josephine Bonaparte Crowell; January 11, 1859; Barrington, Nova Scotia, British North America
- Died: July 27, 1932 (aged 73); Amityville, New York, USA
- Occupation: Actress
- Years active: 1912–1929
- Spouse: Emile La Croix

Josephine Bonaparte Crowell (January 11, 1859 – July 27, 1932) was a Canadian film actress of the silent era. She appeared in more than 90 films between 1912 and 1929.

== Biography ==
Crowell was born in Barrington, Nova Scotia, the only child of Captain Nathan Crowell and Susan E. Shepherd.

Crowell debuted in the theater in 1879, and she appeared on Broadway as Mrs. Pitcher in Captain Mollhy (1902). She began her film acting career in the 1912 film The School Teacher and the Waif. By 1919, she had appeared in 50 films, many of which were film shorts. Her notable film appearances during this period were in the early films of D.W. Griffith, including her portrayals of Mrs. Cameron in the controversial 1915 historical drama The Birth of a Nation and Catherine de' Medici in the 1916 historical epic Intolerance. In 1920, she appeared with Gladys Brockwell in Flames of the Flesh, followed by another six film appearances that year. From 1921 until 1929, she had 34 more film appearances, including Hot Water in which she played Harold Lloyd's mother-in-law and The Splendid Crime starring Bebe Daniels in 1925.

Her last role was in the 1929 film Wrong Again, starring Stan Laurel and Oliver Hardy. With the coming of sound films, her career abruptly ended. She had married actor Emile La Croix earlier in her career, and was residing in Amityville, New York at the time of her death.

Crowell also performed in vaudeville.

Crowell died on July 27, 1932, at the Brunswick Home in Amityville, aged 73.

== Partial filmography ==
- The School Teacher and the Waif (1912, Short)
- The Mothering Heart (1913, Short) - Woman Collecting Ironing (uncredited)
- Home, Sweet Home (1914) - Payne's Mother
- The Painted Lady (1914, Short) - The Mother
- The Tear That Burned (1914)
- The Sisters (1914)
- The Birth of a Nation (1915) - Mrs. Cameron
- A Yankee from the West (1915)
- The Penitentes (1915)
- The Wharf Rat (1916)
- Intolerance (1916) - Catherine de Médici
- The House Built Upon Sand (1916)
- The Little School Ma'am (1916) - Widow Larkin
- The Old Folks at Home (1916)
- The Bad Boy (1917)
- Cheerful Givers (1917)
- Betsy's Burglar (1917)
- Rebecca of Sunnybrook Farm (1917)
- Hearts of the World (1918)
- Stella Maris (1918)
- Women's Weapons (1918)
- Diane of the Green Van (1919)
- Peppy Polly (1919)
- Josselyn's Wife (1919)
- The Greatest Question (1919)
- The Six Best Cellars (1920)
- Crooked Streets (1920)
- Dangerous to Men (1920)
- Held by the Enemy (1920)
- Bunty Pulls the Strings (1921)
- Don't Neglect Your Wife (1921)
- Live and Let Live (1921)
- Home Stuff (1921)
- Shattered Idols (1922)
- Seeing's Believing (1922)
- Lights of the Desert (1922)
- Minnie (1922)
- Main Street (1923)
- Ashes of Vengeance (1923)
- Yesterday's Wife (1923)
- Rupert of Hentzau (1923)
- Hot Water (1924)
- Flowing Gold (1924)
- The Sporting Venus (1925)
- Zander the Great (1925)
- Welcome Home (1925)
- The Merry Widow (1925)
- New Brooms (1925)
- Yellow Fingers (1926)
- Dog Shy (1926)
- Bred in Old Kentucky (1926)
- For Wives Only (1926)
- The Splendid Crime (1926)
- Mantrap (1926)
- Fighting Love (1927)
- The Man Who Laughs (1928)
- Speedy (1928)
- Wrong Again (1929)

== Sources ==
- Slide, Anthony (1973). The Griffith Actresses. A. S. Barnes. ISBN 978-0-498-01018-7.
- Massa, Steve (2017). Slapstick Divas: The Women of Silent Comedy. BearManor Media. ISBN 978-1-62933-132-4.
