= Father and Son (1929 American film) =

1929 American film directed by Erle C. Kenton

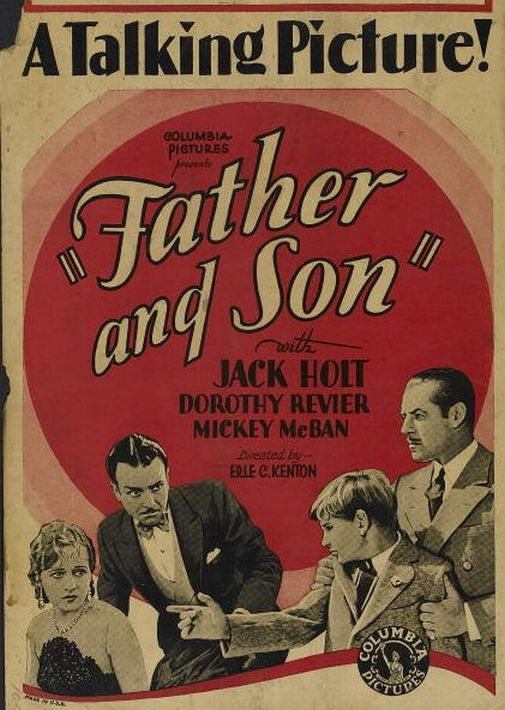
- Directed by: Erle C. Kenton
- Written by: Elmer Harris
- Produced by: Harry Cohn
- Starring: Jack Holt; Dorothy Revier; Helene Chadwick
- Cinematography: Ted Tetzlaff
- Music by: Constantin Bakaleinikoff
- Production company: Columbia Pictures
- Distributed by: Columbia Pictures
- Release date: May 13, 1929
- Running time: 72 minutes
- Country: United States
- Languages: Sound (Part-Talkie); English intertitles

Father and Son is a 1929 American sound part-talkie pre-Code drama film directed by Erle C. Kenton from a story by Elmer Harris. In addition to sequences with audible dialogue or talking sequences, the film features a synchronized musical score and sound effects along with English intertitles. The sound was recorded via the Western Electric sound-on-film process. The film was produced by Harry Cohn for Columbia Pictures.

== Plot ==
Frank Fields (Jack Holt), a prosperous businessman, is a widower devoted entirely to his young son Jimmie (Mickey McBan). The two share a deep bond, their household one of warmth and companionship. On Jimmie's tenth birthday, Frank presents him with a special gift: a Recordograph, a new voice-recording device. It delights the boy, who cherishes it as a tangible reminder of his father's love.

But Frank must leave for Europe on business. To watch over Jimmie in his absence, he entrusts him to their kind-hearted and charming neighbor, Miss White (Helene Chadwick), who already has a sisterly affection for the boy.

In Europe, Frank meets Grace Moore (Dorothy Revier), a glamorous woman who introduces herself as a socialite but is in reality Countess Moletti, a notorious adventuress. Frank is instantly captivated by her beauty and charm. What he does not know is that Grace is living with Anton Lebau (Wheeler Oakman), a suave but dangerous confidence man wanted by the police.

When Anton grows jealous of her intimacy with Frank, Grace betrays him to the authorities. As the police drag him away, Anton swears revenge, vowing to destroy both Grace and the man who has supplanted him.

Frank, blinded by infatuation, returns home with Grace as his new bride. But Jimmie is shocked and resistant. Still mourning his mother, he cannot accept this stranger as a replacement. Grace makes half-hearted attempts at kindness but in truth resents the boy and soon schemes to widen the rift between father and son.

One morning, a letter arrives from Anton Lebau—already escaped from custody—warning Frank about Grace's true identity. Grace intercepts the letter and burns most of it in the fireplace, but a charred scrap survives. Jimmie, who collects stamps, finds the partially burned envelope with its foreign postmark and saves it in his stamp book, unknowingly preserving evidence.

When Frank notices the envelope in Jimmie's collection, Grace slyly suggests the boy has been meddling. Misled, Frank harshly reprimands Jimmie for interfering. Hurt and misunderstood, Jimmie runs away to the safety of Miss White, who takes him in tenderly.

Later, Frank discovers the remaining fragment of Lebau's letter, which confirms Grace's deception. Enraged, he confronts his wife, leading to a violent quarrel. He orders her out of his home.

That night, Jimmie sneaks back to retrieve some of his belongings. Carrying an air rifle and his toys, he enters the library where the Recordograph sits. Realizing he cannot take the bulky machine with him, he decides instead to leave a message for his father, speaking into the device words of love and farewell.

Grace enters the room just as he finishes. Seeing the boy clutching his air rifle, she panics and screams at him. Terrified, Jimmie flees the room.

Moments later, Anton Lebau—recently released and burning for revenge—slips into the house. He confronts Grace, accusing her of betrayal. Their bitter exchange ends when he seizes the carving knife and kills her in cold blood. To frame Jimmie, Anton hurls the boy's air rifle out the window before making his escape.

Frank rushes into the library and finds Grace dead. Circumstantial evidence—the presence of the boy's gun, his sudden disappearance—leads Frank to believe Jimmie may have struck her down. Meanwhile, Jimmie, remembering Grace's terrified scream, fears his father committed the murder. Out of devotion to one another, both father and son prepare to sacrifice themselves, each willing to shoulder the blame to protect the other.

The tangled mystery is finally resolved when investigators discover both the charred fragment of Lebau's letter and Jimmie's recorded farewell on the Recordograph. Together, these reveal the sequence of events and expose Lebau as the true murderer.

The police close in on the fugitive confidence man, while Frank and Jimmie are reunited after resolving their differences. With earlier misunderstandings cleared up, they resume their relationship. Miss White, who has supported the family throughout the events, remains by their side. The Fields family looks toward the future following Grace's departure.

== Cast ==
- Jack Holt as Frank Fields
- Dorothy Revier as Grace Moore
- Helene Chadwick as Miss White
- Mickey McBan as Jimmy Fields
- Wheeler Oakman as Anton Lebau

== Music ==
The film featured a theme song entitled "There's No Other Dad Like My Dad" composed by Constantin Bakaleinikoff. The song is sung by Mickey McBan in the film.

== Production ==
Production for Father and Son began by Columbia Pictures on February 23, 1929.

== Preservation and status ==
A copy of the film is held at the Cinematheque Royale de Belgique, and a part-talking copy of the film is held at the Library of Congress.

== See also ==
- List of early sound feature films (1926–1929)
