= Wrong Again (film) =

1929 film

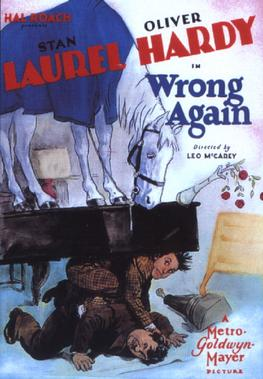
- Theatrical release poster
- Directed by: Leo McCarey
- Written by: Lewis R. Foster (story); Leo McCarey (story); H. M. Walker (intertitles)
- Produced by: Hal Roach
- Starring: Stan Laurel; Oliver Hardy; Dell Henderson; Josephine Crowell; William Gillespie; Fred Holmes; Sam Lufkin; Harry Bernard; Charlie Hall; Jack Hill
- Cinematography: Jack Roach; George Stevens
- Edited by: Richard C. Currier
- Distributed by: Metro-Goldwyn-Mayer
- Release date: February 23, 1929
- Running time: 20:19
- Country: United States
- Languages: Synchronized Sound; English (Intertitles)

Wrong Again is a 1929 synchronized sound short subject film directed by Leo McCarey and starring Laurel and Hardy. While the film has no audible dialog, it was released with a synchronized orchestral musical score with sound effects. It was filmed in October and November 1928, and released February 23, 1929, by Metro-Goldwyn-Mayer.

== Plot ==
Stable grooms Laurel and Hardy mistakenly believe that a $5,000 reward is offered for their employer's horse named Blue Boy, when in fact, it pertains to the return of the stolen painting, The Blue Boy. Upon learning of this reward, they bring Blue Boy to the painting's owner, unaware of the mix-up. The millionaire instructs them to bring Blue Boy inside his house, unaware that they are referring to the horse.

Upon entering the house, the grooms encounter comedic mishaps, including an altercation with a nude statue, which results in its disassembly and reassembly. Eventually, they manage to place Blue Boy atop the grand piano as requested by the millionaire. However, chaos ensues when a piano leg collapses, leaving Ollie to support the piano while the horse continues to cause mischief by attempting to knock off Stan's hat.

The situation escalates when the millionaire's mother returns home, accompanied by the police bearing the real Blue Boy painting. The millionaire, having completed his bath, clarifies the misunderstanding, prompting Ollie to offer an apology. In haste, Laurel and Hardy, along with Blue Boy, hastily exit the premises, closely followed by the irate millionaire wielding a shotgun. In the ensuing chaos, the priceless painting falls on one of the detectives.

== Cast ==
- Stan Laurel — Stan
- Oliver Hardy — Ollie
- Dell Henderson — millionaire
- Josephine Crowell — millionaire's mother
- William Gillespie — horse owner
- Fred Holmes — stableboy
- Sam Lufkin — Sullivan
- Harry Bernard — policeman
- Charlie Hall — neighbor
- Jack Hill — man on buckboard
- Fred Kelsey
- Anders Randolf

== Production notes ==
Wrong Again contains a sight gag prevalent in 1929 but less familiar to contemporary audiences. As Laurel and Hardy bring their horse, Blue Boy, into the house, Stan lifts the lid off an urn, attaches Blue Boy's rein to it, and drops it to the floor. This action elicits laughter from the audience, as the flimsy lid resembles a horse anchor, a device commonly used during the era. Horse-drawn wagon drivers would employ horse anchors to prevent their animals from straying while they conducted deliveries. A similar gag involving a horse anchor is also present in another Laurel and Hardy film, Going Bye-Bye! (1934), where they employ it in their Model T to prevent the car from wandering away.

The working title of Wrong Again was Just the Reverse, a reference to the 180-degree hand-twist gesture that is a running gag throughout the film. Laurel and Hardy historian Randy Skretvedt writes that the gesture was a running gag around the Hal Roach Studios: creative sparkplug Leo McCarey would remind the writers that a dramatic episode could be infused with comedy by applying just a twist to make it funny. The gesture became a staple of writer-to-writer communication around the studio.

The stable scenes were shot at a Los Angeles sports complex, polo field and ranch known as The Uplifters in Rustic Canyon.

== Critical response ==
Wrong Again is one of the several silent Laurel and Hardy short films that were made with a synchronized music and sound effects track; after its initial theatrical run in 1929, it was rarely seen, and was overshadowed by the sound films. It would eventually be available in a home-edition 8mm or 16mm film, and, as such, almost always without its soundtrack.

Critic William K. Everson was among the first to cast a critical eye on the Laurel and Hardy films. Writing of Wrong Again in 1967, "An off-beat comedy that can only be seen at a disadvantage now in that it was made as both a silent and limited sound release, and undoubtedly paced for sound. Today [1967] only the silent version survives, and at times seems awkward and unsure of itself. Nevertheless, it has some very funny moments.... There is a semi-surrealistic quality to many of the sight gags in Wrong Again."

Silent film authority Bruce Calvert commented, "This entertaining film is one of Laurel and Hardy's most bizarre," while prolific critic Leslie Halliwell takes the opposite stand: "Pleasing but not very inventive star comedy."

Glenn Mitchell added Wrong Again is among the most original Laurel and Hardy comedies, its gags alternately bizarre, risqué and imaginative knockabout.... The best copies of Wrong Again incorporate a restored disc accompaniment from the original release. The skilled orchestral arrangement and appropriate sound effects transform the film into a minor masterpiece, reminding modern audiences of the way silent films were presented at their zenith."
