= The Splendid Crime =

1926 film

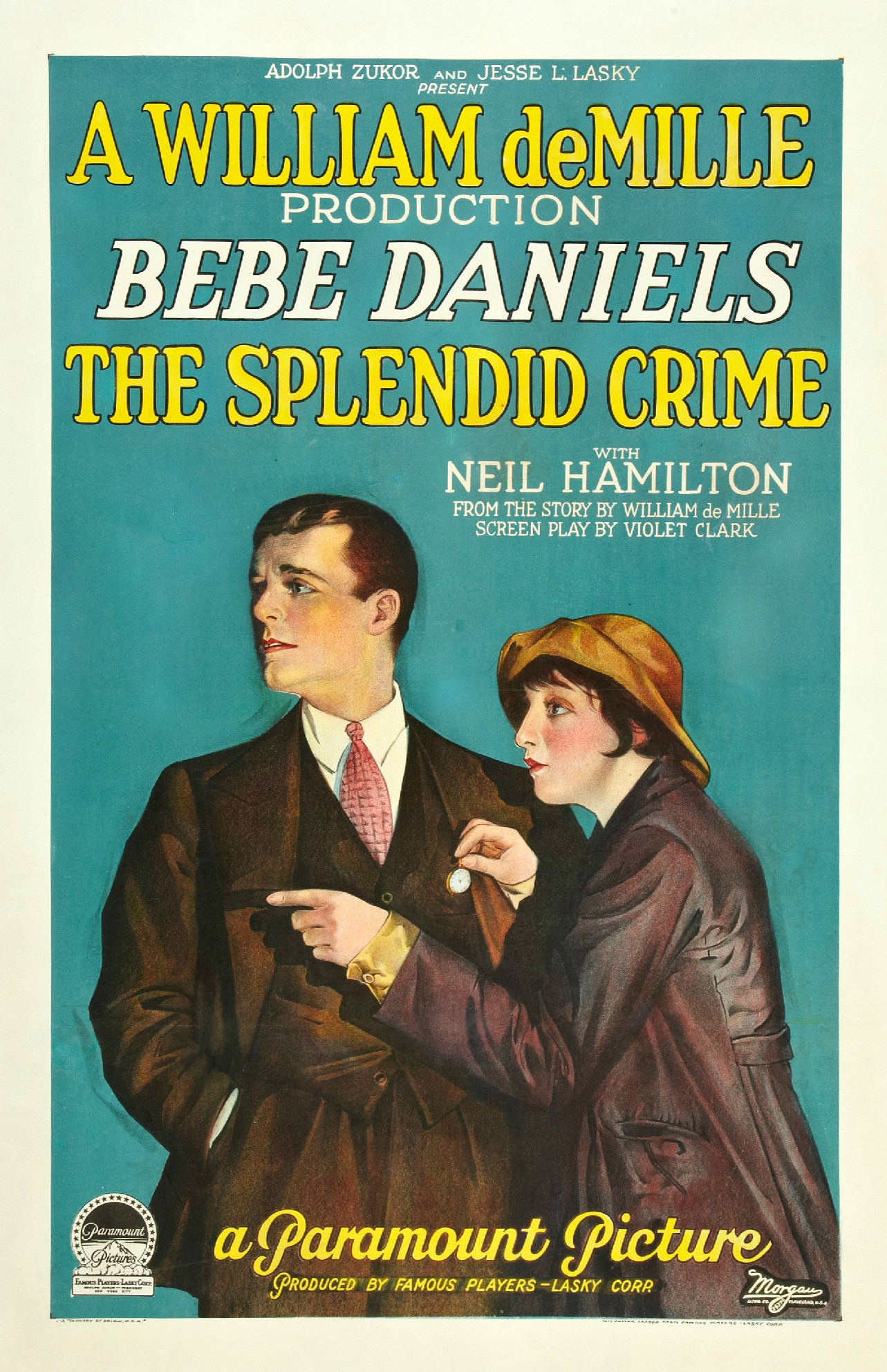
- Film poster
- Directed by: William C. deMille
- Written by: Violet Clark
- Story by: William C. deMille
- Produced by: Adolph Zukor; Jesse Lasky
- Starring: Bebe Daniels; Neil Hamilton
- Cinematography: L. Guy Wilky
- Distributed by: Paramount Pictures
- Release date: January 4, 1926
- Running time: 60 minutes
- Country: United States
- Language: Silent (English intertitles)

The Splendid Crime is a lost 1926 American crime drama film directed by William C. deMille and starring Bebe Daniels. Famous Players–Lasky produced and Paramount Pictures distributed.

== Plot ==
As described in a film magazine review, Jenny, a young woman who is the leader of a band of crooks, is put on the straight road by Bob Van Dyke, a young man whose house she was attempting to rob. Later, the young man who caused Jenny to reform her life becomes involved in a shady transaction. The young woman after she learns this takes action and saves him from his indiscretion. The pair eventually fall in love and become honestly successful.

== Cast ==
- Bebe Daniels as Jenny
- Neil Hamilton as Bob Van Dyke
- Anne Cornwall as Beth Van Dyke
- Anthony Jowitt as John Norton
- Fred Walton as Dugan
- Lloyd Corrigan as Kelly
- Mickey McBan as The Kid
- Josephine Crowell as Mary
- Marcelle Corday as Madame Denise

== Preservation ==
With no prints of The Splendid Crime located in any film archives, it is a lost film.
