= Hot Water (1924 film) =

1924 film

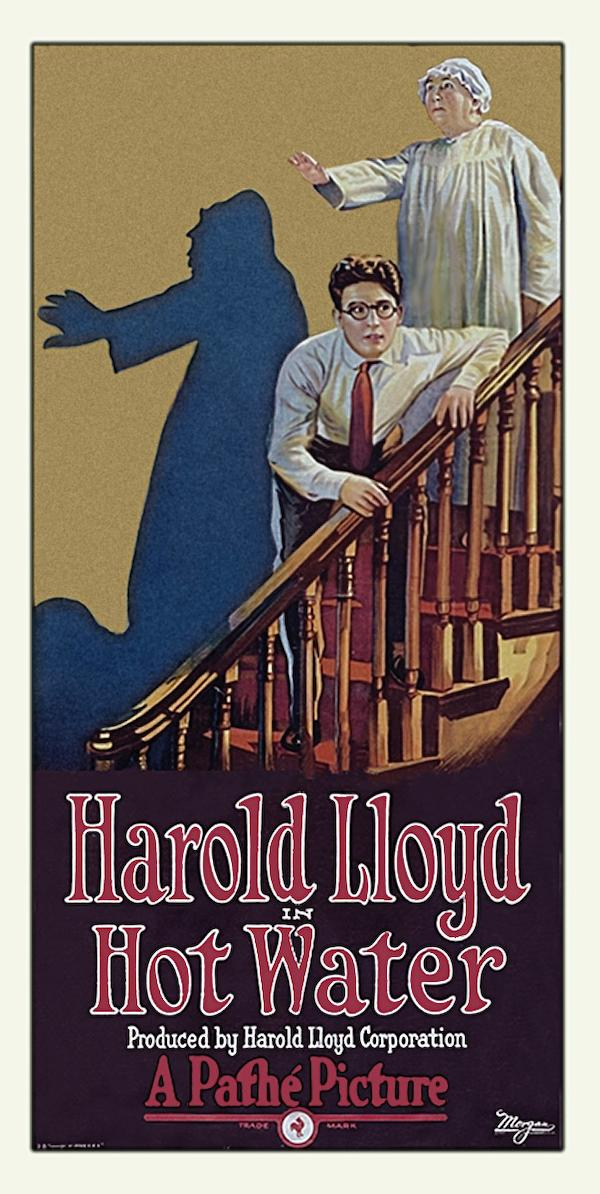
- Theatrical Release Poster
- Directed by: Fred C. Newmeyer; Sam Taylor
- Written by: Thomas J. Gray; Sam Taylor; Tim Whelan; John Grey
- Produced by: Harold Lloyd
- Starring: Harold Lloyd; Jobyna Ralston
- Cinematography: Walter Lundin
- Edited by: Allen McNeil
- Distributed by: Pathé Exchange
- Release date: October 26, 1924
- Running time: 60 minutes
- Country: United States
- Language: Silent (English intertitles)
- Box office: $1,350,000

Hot Water is a 1924 American silent comedy film directed by Fred C. Newmeyer and Sam Taylor and starring Harold Lloyd. It features three episodes in the life of Hubby (Lloyd) as he struggles with domestic life with Wifey (Jobyna Ralston) and his in-laws.

== Plot ==
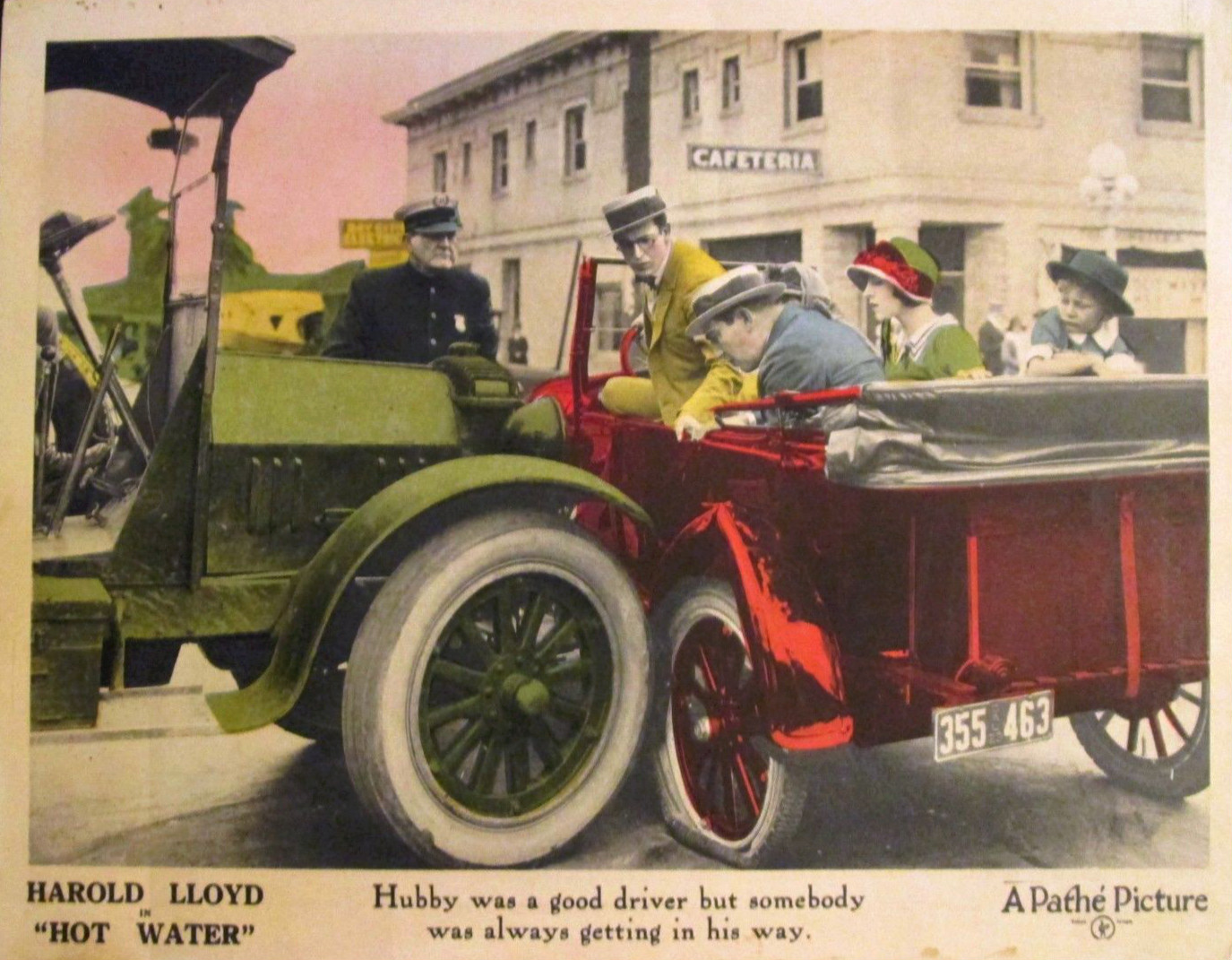
Lobby card for the film

Hot Water (1924)

The film opens with Hubby and his best friend sprinting crazily along the sidewalk to get to the friend's wedding in time. Hubby is impatient and resentful of all of that breathless running, he naively views being single as simpler and more desirable --- "I don't see why a man would want to run to his own wedding! You were born a bachelor, why not just let well enough alone?" He then sportingly opines that he himself would never give up his freedom "just for a pair of soft-boiled eyes," but then he accidentally knocks into the alluringly-lovely Wifey, and after one look into her huge clear gentle "soft-boiled eyes," he's totally smitten. The remainder of the film greatly changes pace. Episodic in nature (effectively three short films merged into one), the first episode features Hubby winning a live turkey in a raffle and taking it home on a crowded streetcar, much to the chagrin of the other passengers. The second features Hubby grudgingly taking the family out on his brand new Butterfly Six automobile (with disastrous results), and the third is an escapade with his sleepwalking mother-in-law. The third segment almost qualifies the film as a horror movie, as in it, Hubby mistakenly believes he has actually killed his mother-in-law, and when she starts sleepwalking later, he thinks she's a ghost haunting him.

== Cast ==
- Harold Lloyd as Hubby
- Jobyna Ralston as Wifey
- Josephine Crowell as Her Mother, Winnifred Ward Stokes
- Charles Stevenson as Her Big Brother, Charley Stokes
- Mickey McBan as Her Little Brother, Bobby Stokes
- Fred Holmes as a Man (uncredited)
- Edgar Dearing as a Motorcycle Cop (uncredited)
- Pat Harmon as a Bus Straphanger In Spider Gag (uncredited)
- George Ward as a Blonde Boy On Trolley (uncredited)
- Billy Rinaldi as a Brunette Boy On Trolley (uncredited)
- Evelyn Burns in a bit part (uncredited)
- Andy DeVilla as Glen Reed (uncredited)
- S.D. Wilcox as Gene Kornman (uncredited)

== Production ==
The film is a light comedy with minimal character development, and followed Lloyd’s early 1920s pattern of alternating what he called “gag pictures” with “character pictures.” Some distributors had complained about the length of his previous elaborate feature Girl Shy, and Hot Water was the response. Its storyline was also interesting as a unique departure from most of Lloyd’s 1920s features, because his character was married with a family, and was not striving for success, recognition, or romance. It was popular at the box office and grossed $1,350,000, an excellent return for a film of the period. The fictional "Butterfly Six" was in reality a 1923 Chevrolet Superior Sedan.

== Renewed interest in Harold Lloyd ==
In 1962, the "live turkey" and "Butterfly Six automobile" sequences were included in a compilation film produced by Harold Lloyd himself entitled Harold Lloyd's World of Comedy. The film premiered at the Cannes Film Festival and created a renewal of interest in the comedian by introducing him to a whole new generation.

Critic Christopher Workman comments "At a way, way too long 60 minutes, "Hot Water" relies on a seemingly endless succession of pratfalls for its yuks. The only horror-tinged segment is the third...Still and all, the film was a huge success."

== See also ==
- Harold Lloyd filmography
