= The Return of Peter Grimm (1926 film) =

1926 film by Victor Schertzinger

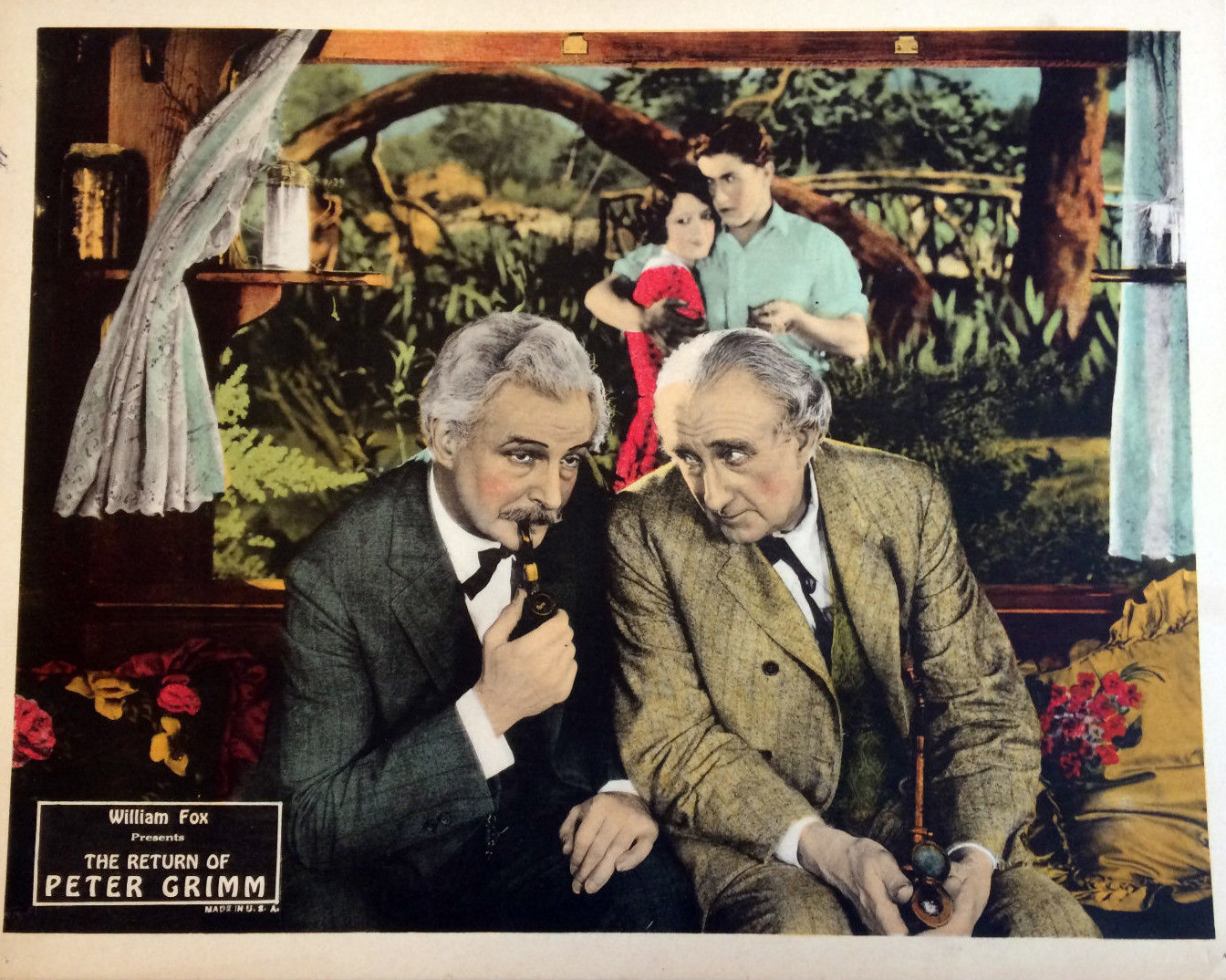
- Lobby card
- Directed by: Victor Schertzinger; William Tummel (assistant director)
- Written by: Bradley King
- Based on: The Return of Peter Grimm by David Belasco (play)
- Produced by: William Fox
- Cinematography: Glen MacWilliams
- Distributed by: Fox Film Corporation
- Release date: November 7, 1926
- Running time: 70 minutes; 7 or 8 reels
- Country: United States
- Language: Silent (English intertitles)

The Return of Peter Grimm is a 1926 American silent fantasy film directed by Victor Schertzinger based on the 1911 play of the same name by David Belasco. It was produced and distributed by the Fox Film Corporation.

A previous short film of this play appeared in 1913. A sound feature was made in 1935, also titled The Return of Peter Grimm.

== Plot ==
The ghost of a recently deceased family patriarch tries to help his surviving relatives, in part by preventing a marriage that he knows will go wrong.

== Cast ==
- Alec B. Francis as Peter Grimm
- John Roche as Frederick Grimm
- Janet Gaynor as Catherine
- Richard Walling as James Hartman
- Lionel Belmore as Reverend Bartholomey
- Elizabeth Patterson as Mrs. Bartholomey
- John St. Polis as Andrew MacPherson (uncredited) (St. Polis played Frederick in the 1911 Broadway play)
- Bodil Rosing as Marta (uncredited)
- Mickey McBan as William (uncredited)
- Florence Gilbert as Annamarie (uncredited)
- Sammy Cohen as The Clown (uncredited)

== Preservation ==
A print of The Return of Peter Grimm survives at the Museum of Modern Art (MOMA) in New York.
