= Poor Men's Wives =

1923 film

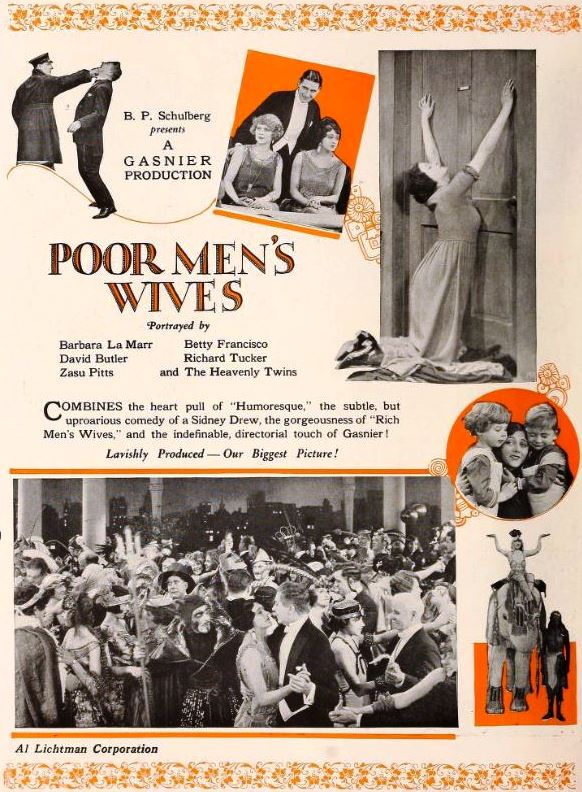
- Directed by: Louis J. Gasnier
- Written by: Frank Mitchell Dazey; Agnes Christine Johnston; Eve Unsell
- Produced by: B.P. Schulberg
- Starring: Barbara La Marr; David Butler; Betty Francisco
- Cinematography: Karl Struss
- Production company: B.P. Schulberg Productions
- Distributed by: Preferred Pictures
- Release date: January 28, 1923
- Running time: 70 minutes
- Country: United States
- Languages: Silent; English intertitles

Poor Men's Wives is a 1923 American silent drama film directed by Louis J. Gasnier and starring Barbara La Marr, David Butler and Betty Francisco. The previous year Gasnier had directed a film called Rich Men's Wives.

== Synopsis ==
Two friends marry men from completely different social backgrounds, one a wealthy man and the other a taxi driver. When they meet by chance some time later they see how different their lives have become.

== Cast ==
- Barbara La Marr as Laura Bedford / Laura Maberne
- David Butler as Jim Maherne
- Betty Francisco as Claribel
- Richard Tucker as Richard Smith-Blanton
- ZaSu Pitts as Apple Annie
- Muriel McCormac as Twin
- Mickey McBan as Twin

== Bibliography ==
- Connelly, Robert B. The Silents: Silent Feature Films, 1910-36, Volume 40, Issue 2. December Press, 1998.
- Munden, Kenneth White. The American Film Institute Catalog of Motion Pictures Produced in the United States, Part 1. University of California Press, 1997.
