= Herschel Henlere =

Canadian pianist

- Born: Herschel Hendler Steinberg; 14 December 1890; Galt, Ontario, Canada
- Died: 13 January 1968 (aged 77); London, England
- Occupations: Pianist, comic entertainer, composer
- Years active: 1910s–1957

Herschel Hendler Steinberg (14 December 1890 – 13 January 1968), known professionally as Herschel Henlere, was a Canadian-born pianist, who had a career as a comic entertainer in American vaudeville and then in British variety shows, billed as "The Mirthful Music Master".

== Life and career ==
He was born in Galt, Ontario, and made his vaudeville debut in San Francisco in 1906. He later traveled as accompanying pianist to singer Anna Held. He soon developed his own novelty act, taking popular songs and playing them in a wide variety of musical styles, with quick transitions between one tune and the next, commenting in a purported French-Canadian accent. He had a successful career in American vaudeville making recordings and piano rolls, and also composed tunes, notably "Kismet", described as an "Arabian foxtrot" and recorded by several bands in the 1920s.

From the 1920s, he spent most of his time in Britain, where he became a leading attraction in variety shows in the late 1920s and 1930s. He was notorious in show business circles for over-running his allotted time slot; he was often put last on the bill so that if necessary theatre managers could end the show by closing the curtains on him. In the mid 1920s he also made successful tours of New Zealand and Australia, where he recorded player piano rolls of several of his vaudeville specialties for the Mastertouch roll company in Sydney. One of these rolls, a ragtime parody of classical tunes named 'Mocking the Classics', became Mastertouch's best selling roll for over a decade.

One review of a 1934 theatre performance stated:

All Henlere's fooling at his own handsome grand piano cannot disguise his complete mastery of the instrument, whether he be giving what is generally recognised as 'good' music, or 'jizz' as this magnetic French-Canadian calls modern popular numbers in his peculiar manner of talk. One minute he has the audience in fits of laughter with his comic asides, the next they sit entranced as he deftly fingers a delicate piece by Liszt or Chopin. Syncopated music comes just as easily to him in a way which makes every foot tap the floor in rhythm. Perhaps the highlight was a brilliantly-arranged medley in which he led the audience through a mass of popular numbers, one chorus being merged into another before they knew it had happened.

It was claimed of him: "A Salvador Dalí look-alike, he drew on Surrealist and Dada aesthetics and on the ragtime, jazz, big band, and dance hall phenomena that were then sweeping Britain. Experimenting with percussive sound, he anticipated the prepared piano of John Cage." He also appeared in films, including the 1912 D. W. Griffith shorts The School Teacher and the Waif and A Temporary Truce under the name "Bert Hendler", and Soldiers of the King (1933) and Crazy People (1934). He continued to perform in Britain, and made broadcasts on BBC radio, until the 1950s, and appeared in the 1957 Royal Variety Performance.

He died in London in 1968, aged 77.
