= A Temporary Truce =

1912 film

- Directed by: D. W. Griffith
- Written by: George Hennessy
- Starring: Blanche Sweet; Charles Hill Mailes
- Cinematography: G. W. Bitzer
- Distributed by: Biograph Company
- Release date: June 10, 1912
- Running time: 17 minutes
- Country: United States
- Language: Silent (English intertitles)

A Temporary Truce is a 1912 American short silent Western film directed by D. W. Griffith and starring Blanche Sweet. A print of the film survives in the film archive of the Library of Congress.

== Plot ==
Mexican Jim, the villain, kidnaps Alice, wife of Jack the prospector. Jack declares a temporary truce with Jim so they can both battle the Indians as a common enemy.

== Cast ==
- Charles Hill Mailes as Mexican Jim
- Claire McDowell as Mexican Jim's Wife
- Charles Gorman as Jack, the Prospector
- Blanche Sweet as Alice, the Prospector's Wife
- W. Chrystie Miller as The Murdered Indian / Indian on Street
- W. Christy Cabanne as An Indian
- William A. Carroll as In Bar / Among Rescuers
- Frank Evans as In Bar / Among Rescuers
- Robert Harron as The Murdered Indian's Son
- Bert Hendler as In Bar
- Harry Hyde as Among Rescuers / Outside Pony Express Office
- J. Jiquel Lanoe as An Indian / Among Rescuers
- Wilfred Lucas as An Indian
- Mae Marsh as A Murdered Settler
- Frank Opperman as A Drunken Cutthroat / The Indian Chief / The Bartender
- Alfred Paget as A Drunken Cutthroat / An Indian / Among Rescuers
- Jack Pickford as An Indian
- W. C. Robinson as An Indian / In Bar / Among Rescuers
- Charles West

== Themes ==
D. W. Griffith did not always portray Mexican characters in a negative light; however, in this film they are portrayed as a threat to white families and women. The film is more complex in this regard that previous Griffith work.

== Production ==
The cast was considered to be quite large for a short film under two reels. This is one of three D. W. Griffith films that Bert Hendler appeared in. The cast also included Mae Marsh, who worked with Griffith on many films, including The Birth of a Nation. She was one of his favorites and in a 1923 interview, Griffith noted that "Mae Marsh was born a film star."

== See also ==
- List of American films of 1912
- D. W. Griffith filmography
- Blanche Sweet filmography
