= What Every Girl Should Know (film) =

1927 film

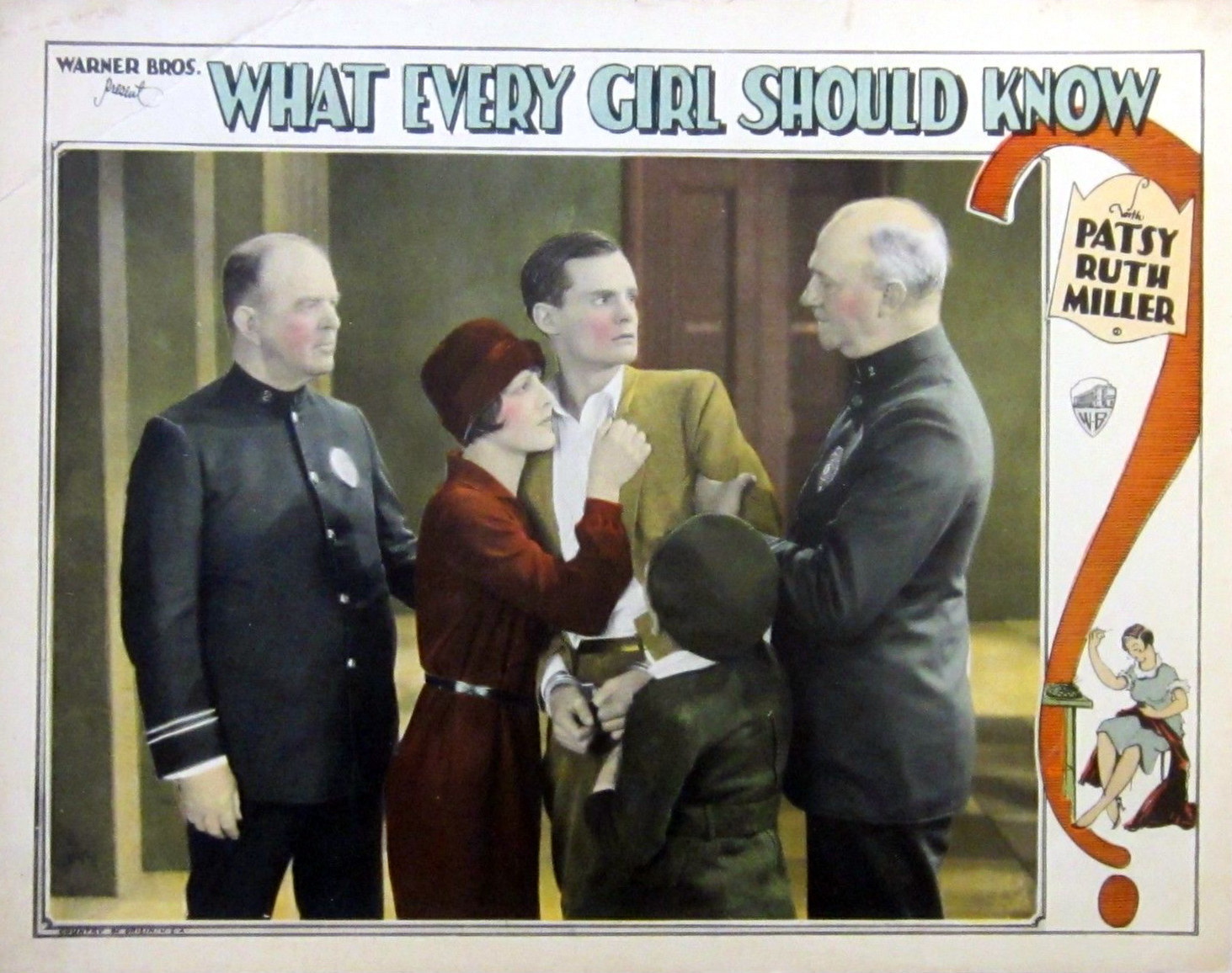
- Lobby card
- Directed by: Charles Reisner
- Screenplay by: Lois Jackson
- Story by: Jack Wagner
- Starring: Patsy Ruth Miller; Ian Keith; Carroll Nye; Mickey McBan; Lillian Langdon; Hazel Howell
- Cinematography: David Abel
- Production company: Warner Bros.
- Distributed by: Warner Bros.
- Release date: March 20, 1927
- Running time: 70 minutes
- Country: United States
- Language: Silent (English intertitles)

What Every Girl Should Know is a 1927 American silent romance film directed by Charles Reisner and starring Patsy Ruth Miller, Ian Keith, Carroll Nye, Mickey McBan, Lillian Langdon, and Hazel Howell. Written by Lois Jackson, the film was released by Warner Bros. on March 20, 1927.

== Cast ==
- Patsy Ruth Miller as Mary Sullivan
- Ian Keith as Arthur Graham
- Carroll Nye as Dave Sullivan
- Mickey McBan as Bobby Sullivan
- Lillian Langdon as Mrs. Randolph
- Hazel Howell as Estelle Randolph
- Carmelita Geraghty as Madame Le Fleur

== Preservation ==
With no copies listed in any film archives, What Every Girl Should Know is a lost film.
