= List of Fox Film films =

This is a list of feature films produced by the Fox Film Corporation, including those 11 films produced by the Box Office Attractions Company, its corporate predecessor. Some of the later films in this list were produced by Fox Film, but were distributed by 20th Century Fox after their 1935 merger with Twentieth Century Pictures. Unfortunately a devastating 1937 vault fire in New Jersey destroyed 75% of the studios 1914-1929 film catalogue leaving only a few titles known to survive in some form. The # syndicates a film considered to be lost.

== Key ==
#	Considered to be lost.

Note: None of the Fox Film Corporation Films from 1919 are known to exist in full.

== 1910s ==
=== 1914 ===
Release date	Title	Notes
8 February	Gertie the Dinosaur	First film distributed. Inducted into the National Film Registry in 1991.
25 February	Shadows of the Moulin Rouge^{#}	
10 April	Fighting Death^{#}	
August	St. Elmo^{#}	
19 November	Life's Shop Window^{#}	First film produced.
23 November	The Walls of Jericho^{#}	
7 December	The Thief^{#}	
21 December	The Idler^{#}	

=== 1915 ===
Release date	Title	Notes
4 January	Samson	
14 January	A Fool There Was	Inducted into the National Film Registry in 2015.
25 January	The Girl I Left Behind Me^{#}	
1 February	Now d.b.a. Fox Films	
1 February	A Gilded Fool^{#}	
8 February	Children of the Ghetto^{#}	
11 February	The Celebrated Scandal^{#}	
1 March	The Kreutzer Sonata^{#}	
22 March	The Nigger^{#}	
1 April	From the Valley of the Missing^{#}	
5 April	Anna Karenina^{#}	
19 April	The Clemenceau Case^{#}	
10 May	Princess Romanoff^{#}	
16 May	A Woman's Resurrection^{#}	
31 May	The Plunderer^{#}	
7 June	Wormwood^{#}	
21 June	The Devil's Daughter^{#}	
5 July	Should a Mother Tell?^{#}	
15 July	Dr. Rameau^{#}	
4 August	Lady Audley's Secret^{#}	
6 September	The Two Orphans^{#}	
13 September	The Song of Hate^{#}	
20 September	Regeneration	Inducted into the National Film Registry in 2000.
27 September	The Wonderful Adventure^{#}	
4 October	Sin^{#}	
11 October	The Little Gypsy^{#}	
18 October	The Soul of Broadway^{#}	
25 October	The Family Stain^{#}	
2 November	Carmen^{#}	
19 November	The Blindness of Devotion^{#}	
15 November	A Woman's Past^{#}	
22 November	The Broken Law^{#}	
28 November	The Galley Slave^{#}	
6 December	The Unfaithful Wife^{#}	
13 December	Her Mother's Secret^{#}	
20 December	A Soldier's Oath^{#}	
27 December	Destruction^{#}	

=== 1916 ===
Release date	Title	Notes
3 January	The Green-Eyed Monster ^{#}	
10 January	A Parisian Romance^{#}	
17 January	The Fourth Estate^{#}	
23 January	The Serpent^{#}	
31 January	The Ruling Passion^{#}	
14 February	The Fool's Revenge^{#}	
17 February	Merely Mary Ann^{#}	
21 February	Fighting Blood^{#}	
28 February	The Witch^{#}	
6 March	The Marble Heart^{#}	
13 March	Gold and the Woman^{#}	
20 March	The Bondman^{#}	
27 March	A Wife's Sacrifice^{#}	
3 April	Blue Blood and Red^{#}	
10 April	Slander^{#}	
17 April	A Modern Thelma^{#}	
23 April	A Man of Sorrow^{#}	
1 May	Blazing Love^{#}	
8 May	The Eternal Sapho^{#}	
15 May	Sins of Men^{#}	
22 May	The Battle of Hearts^{#}	Fragments exist.
29 May	The Spider and the Fly^{#}	
5 June	Hypocrisy^{#}	
12 June	A Woman's Honor^{#}	
19 June	East Lynne	
25 June	Ambition^{#}	
3 July	The Man from Bitter Roots^{#}	
10 July	Caprice of the Mountains^{#}	
17 July	A Tortured Heart ^{#}	
24 July	The Beast^{#}	
31 July	Under Two Flags^{#}	
7 August	The End of the Trail^{#}	
14 August	Sporting Blood^{#}	
21 August	Daredevil Kate^{#}	
28 August	Little Miss Happiness^{#}	
11 September	Her Double Life^{#}	
14 September	The Unwelcome Mother^{#}	
18 September	Where Love Leads^{#}	
26 September	The Fires of Conscience^{#}	
2 October	The Straight Way^{#}	
9 October	The War Bride's Secret^{#}	
16 October	The Ragged Princess^{#}	
17 October	A Daughter of the Gods^{#}	
13 October	Romeo and Juliet^{#}	
30 October	Love and Hate^{#}	
6 November	Sins of Her Parent^{#}	
13 November	The Mediator^{#}	
20 November	Jealousy^{#}	
27 November	The Mischief Maker^{#}	
4 December	The Vixen^{#}	
11 December	The Battle of Life^{#}	
19 December	The Love Thief^{#}	
25 December	The Victim^{#}	

=== 1917 ===
Release date	Title	Notes
1 January	The Island of Desire^{#}	
8 January	A Modern Cinderella^{#}	
8 January	The Price of Silence^{#}	
15 January	The Bitter Truth^{#}	
22 January	The Darling of Paris^{#}	
22 January	The Primitive Call^{#}	
29 January	One Touch of Sin^{#}	
5 February	The New York Peacock^{#}	
12 February	The Scarlet Letter^{#}	
19 February	Melting Millions^{#}	
26 February	The Tiger Woman^{#}	
26 February	A Child of the Wild^{#}	
5 March	Sister Against Sister^{#}	
12 March	Love's Law^{#}	
12 March	A Tale of Two Cities	
19 March	The Blue Streak^{#}	
26 March	High Finance^{#}	
2 April	Her Greatest Love^{#}	
2 April	Tangled Lives^{#}	
9 April	Her Temptation^{#}	
16 April	The Derelict^{#}	
23 April	She^{#}	
30 April	Royal Romance^{#}	
30 April	American Methods^{#}	
7 May	The Small Town Girl^{#}	
14 May	The Book Agent^{#}	
20 May	Heart and Soul^{#}	
21 May	The Final Payment^{#}	
28 May	The Silent Lie^{#}	
3 June	The Slave^{#}	
10 June	The Broadway Sport^{#}	
17 June	Some Boy!^{#}	
24 June	The Siren^{#}	
1 July	Patsy^{#}	
9 July	Two Little Imps^{#}	
15 July	To Honor and Obey ^{#}	
23 July	The Innocent Sinner^{#}	
30 July	Wife Number Two^{#}	
6 August	Wrath of Love^{#}	
13 August	Durand of the Bad Lands^{#}	Tom Mix's first feature film with Fox.
19 August	The Spy^{#}	
20 August	The Soul of Satan^{#}	
26 August	The Honor System^{#}	
26 August	Every Girl's Dream^{#}	
2 September	Betrayed^{#}	
2 September	Jack and the Beanstalk	
9 September	When False Tongues Speak	
16 September	The Yankee Way^{#}	
16 September	The Conqueror^{#}	
23 September	North of 53^{#}	
30 September	Camille^{#}	
30 September	A Rich Man's Plaything^{#}	
7 October	Conscience^{#}	
7 October	When a Man Sees Red^{#}	
14 October	Thou Shalt Not Steal^{#}	
14 October	Cleopatra^{#}	1 minute exists.
14 October	Aladdin and the Wonderful Lamp	
21 October	This Is the Life ^{#}	
4 November	The Rose of Blood^{#}	
4 November	Miss U.S.A.^{#}	
11 November	The Painted Madonna^{#}	
18 November	All for a Husband^{#}	
25 November	A Branded Soul^{#}	
28 November	The Scarlet Pimpernel^{#}	
2 December	The Babes in the Woods	
3 December	Les Misérables	
9 December	Unknown 274^{#}	
9 December	Trouble Makers^{#}	
16 December	The Heart of a Lion^{#}	
16 December	The Pride of New York^{#}	
23 December	The Kingdom of Love^{#}	
30 December	For Liberty^{#}	
30 December	Madame du Barry^{#}	

=== 1918 ===
Release date	Title	Notes
6 January	Stolen Honor^{#}	
13 January	Cupid's Round Up^{#}	
19 January	A Heart's Revenge^{#}	
20 January	Cheating the Public^{#}	
27 January	Treasure Island^{#}	
3 February	The Heart of Romance^{#}	
3 February	The Forbidden Path^{#}	
10 February	Jack Spurlock, Prodigal^{#}	
17 February	The Moral Law^{#}	
24 February	Six Shooter Andy^{#}	
3 March	The Girl with the Champagne Eyes^{#}	
10 March	The Debt of Honor^{#}	
17 March	The Devil's Wheel^{#}	
17 March	Woman and the Law^{#}	
24 March	Rough and Ready^{#}	
24 March	A Daughter of France^{#}	
31 March	A Camouflage Kiss^{#}	
7 April	The Bride of Fear^{#}	
7 April	The Blindness of Divorce^{#}	
14 April	Western Blood^{#}	
21 April	The Soul of Buddha^{#}	23 seconds exist from the documentary Theda Bara et William Fox (2001)
21 April	American Buds^{#}	
28 April	Her One Mistake^{#}	
5 May	Brave and Bold^{#}	
5 May	True Blue^{#}	
12 May	Peg of the Pirates ^{#}	
19 May	Confession^{#}	
26 May	The Firebrand^{#}	
2 June	Blue-Eyed Mary^{#}	
9 June	Under the Yoke^{#}	
9 June	Ace High	
16 June	We Should Worry^{#}	
23 June	The Scarlet Road^{#}	
30 June	The Kid is Clever^{#}	
7 July	Other Men's Daughters^{#}	
14 July	Her Price	
21 July	Miss Innocence^{#}	
28 July	The Fallen Angel ^{#}	
4 August	Doing Their Bit^{#}	
11 August	The Bird of Prey^{#}	
18 August	The Liar^{#}	
25 August	Lawless Love^{#}	
1 September	Bonnie Annie Laurie^{#}	
1 September	The Prussian Cur^{#}	
1 September	Queen of the Sea^{#}	
1 September	Riders of the Purple Sage^{#}	
8 September	Mr. Logan, U.S.A.^{#}	
8 September	Land of the Free#	
15 September	The Caillaux Case^{#}	
15 September	The Queen of Hearts^{#}	
22 September	Kultur^{#}	
29 September	Swat the Spy	
29 September	When a Woman Sins^{#}	23 seconds exist.
6 October	On the Jump ^{#}	
6 October	Salomé^{#}	2 minutes exist.
13 October	The Rainbow Trail^{#}	
13 October	Marriages Are Made^{#}	
10 November	The She-Devil^{#}	
13 November	Why I Would Not Marry?^{#}	
17 November	Fan Fan^{#}	
17 November	Tell It to the Marines^{#}	
17 November	The Woman Who Gave^{#}	
24 November	Fame and Fortune^{#}	
25 November	Ali Baba and the Forty Thieves#	
1 December	Buchanan's Wife^{#}	
1 December	Every Mother's Son^{#}	
8 December	The Strange Woman^{#}	
15 December	Caught in the Act^{#}	
15 December	I Want to Forget^{#}	
22 December	I'll Say So^{#}	
29 December	The Danger Zone^{#}	
29 December	For Freedom^{#}	

=== 1919 ===
Release date	Title	Notes
5 January	Treat 'Em Rough^{#}	2 reels exist
12 January	The Light ^{#}	
19 January	The Call of the Soul^{#}	
26 January	Woman, Woman!^{#}	
26 January	The Girl With No Regrets^{#}	
2 February	Luck and Pluck ^{#}	
9 February	The Love Auction^{#}	
16 February	Hell-Roarin' Reform^{#}	
23 February	Smiles^{#}	
23 February	The Man Hunter^{#}	
2 March	The Forbidden Room^{#}	
9 March	When Men Desire^{#}	
9 March	Gambling in Souls^{#}	
16 March	Never Say Quit^{#}	
23 March	Thou Shalt Not^{#}	
23 March	The Rebellious Bride^{#}	
30 March	Fighting for Gold^{#}	fragment in private collection
6 April	Married in Haste^{#}	
13 April	Pitfalls of a Big City^{#}	
20 April	The Jungle Trail^{#}	
20 April	The Love That Dares^{#}	
27 April	Help! Help! Police!^{#}	
4 May	Miss Adventure^{#}	
4 May	The Siren's Song^{#}	
11 May	The Coming of the Law^{#}	1 reel exists
18 May	A Fallen Idol^{#}	
18 May	Words and Music By—^{#}	
25 May	The Divorce Trap^{#}	
1 June	A Woman There Was^{#}	
1 June	When Fate Decides^{#}	
15 June	My Little Sister^{#}	
15 June	Cowardice Court^{#}	
22 June	Putting One Over^{#}	
29 June	The Lone Star Ranger^{#}	
29 June	Be a Little Sport^{#}	
13 July	The Wilderness Trail^{#}	
20 July	Rose of the West^{#}	
27 July	The Sneak^{#}	
3 August	Cheating Herself^{#}	
10 August	Wolves of the Night^{#}	
17 August	Love Is Love ^{#}	
24 August	Rough Riding Romance^{#}	fragment exists
31 August	Checkers^{#}	
7 September	The Splendid Sin^{#}	
14 September	Broken Commandments^{#}	
21 September	Evangeline^{#}	
21 September	La Belle Russe^{#}	
21 September	The Merry-Go-Round ^{#}	
28 September	The Winning Stroke^{#}	
5 October	The Lost Princess^{#}	
12 October	Sacred Silence^{#}	
12 October	Last of the Duanes^{#}	
12 October	Kathleen Mavourneen^{#}	
19 October	The Speed Maniac^{#}	
19 October	Snares of Paris^{#}	
26 October	Chasing Rainbows^{#}	
2 November	A Girl in Bohemia^{#}	
9 November	Should a Husband Forgive?^{#}	
16 November	Vagabond Luck^{#}	
16 November	Lure of Ambition^{#}	43 seconds exist.
16 November	Eastward Ho!^{#}	
23 November	Thieves^{#}	
30 November	Lost Money ^{#}	
30 November	Wings of the Morning^{#}	
7 December	The Feud^{#}	
14 December	The Web of Chance^{#}	
21 December	The Lincoln Highwayman^{#}	
28 December	Tin Pan Alley^{#}	

== 1920s ==
=== 1920 ===
Release date	Title	Notes
4 January	Flames of the Flesh^{#}	
11 January	What Would You Do?^{#}	
18 January	The Shark^{#}	
25 January	The Cyclone^{#}	
25 January	Faith^{#}	
25 January	Heart Strings^{#}	
1 February	Her Elephant Man^{#}	
8 February	The Last Straw^{#}	
15 February	The Strongest^{#}	
15 February	Shod with Fire^{#}	
22 February	The Hell Ship^{#}	
29 February	The Devil's Riddle^{#}	
7 March	The Daredevil^{#}	
7 March	Black Shadows^{#}	
14 March	The Adventurer^{#}	
14 March	A Manhattan Knight^{#}	
28 March	Molly and I^{#}	
4 April	The Tattlers^{#}	
11 April	The Mother of His Children^{#}	
1 April	Desert Love^{#}	
18 April	Would You Forgive?^{#}	
18 April	The Orphan^{#}	
25 April	Leave It to Me!^{#}	
9 May	The Dead Line^{#}	
16 May	Forbidden Trails^{#}	
16 May	The Terror^{#}	
23 May	Love's Harvest ^{#}	
30 May	The Iron Heart^{#}	
6 June	White Lies^{#}	
13 June	A World of Folly^{#}	
20 June	Twins of Suffering Creek^{#}	
27 June	The Joyous Trouble-Makers^{#}	
4 July	3 Gold Coins^{#}	
4 July	A Sister to Salome^{#}	
25 July	The Spirit of Good^{#}	
1 August	The Rose of Nome^{#}	
8 August	The White Moll^{#}	
8 August	The Square Shooter^{#}	
15 August	The Little Wanderer^{#}	
22 August	Her Honor the Mayor	
22 August	If I Were King	
29 August	The Man Who Dared ^{#}	
5 September	The Untamed	
5 September	Firebrand Trevison^{#}	
5 September	The Skywayman^{#}	
12 September	While New York Sleeps	
12 September	Merely Mary Ann^{#}	
19 September	The Husband Hunter'^{#}	
26 September	From Now On^{#}	
3 October	Sunset Sprague^{#}	
10 October	The Tiger's Cub^{#}	
10 October	The Challenge of the Law	
17 October	Beware of the Bride^{#}	
24 October	The Girl of My Heart^{#}	
24 October	Drag Harlan	
31 October	The Little Grey Mouse^{#}	
31 October	The Texan	
31 October	The Face at Your Window^{#}	
7 November	The Plunger^{#}	
15 November	Just Pals	
21 November	The Iron Rider^{#}	
28 November	The Thief^{#}	
28 November	The Land of Jazz^{#}	
5 December	Flame of Youth^{#}	
12 December	The Scuttlers^{#}	
12 December	Number 17#	
19 December	Two Moons^{#}	
19 December	Blind Wives	
26 December	Prairie Trails^{#}	

=== 1921 ===
Release date	Title	Notes
2 January	Partners of Fate^{#}	
9 January	The Cheater Reformed^{#}	
16 January	Why Trust Your Husband?^{#}	
23 January	The Mountain Woman^{#}	
30 January	The Big Punch^{#}	
30 January	Wing Toy^{#}	
13 February	While the Devil Laughs^{#}	
20 February	The Road Demon^{#}	Fragments extant.
20 February	Dynamite Allen^{#}	
27 February	The Blushing Bride^{#}	
13 March	Oliver Twist, Jr.	
20 March	Know Your Men^{#}	
20 March	Bare Knuckles^{#}	
27 March	The One-Man Trail^{#}	
3 April	Hands Off!^{#}	
10 April	The Lamplighter^{#}	
10 April	Skirts^{#}	
10 April	The Tomboy^{#}	
17 April	His Greatest Sacrifice #	
1 May	Colorado Pluck^{#}	
8 May	Hearts of Youth^{#}	
8 May	Beyond Price ^{#}	
22 May	Get Your Man^{#}	
22 May	A Ridin' Romeo^{#}	
29 May	The Mother Heart^{#}	
5 June	Big Town Ideas^{#}	
9 June	Straight from the Shoulder^{#}	
26 June	Children of the Night^{#}	
3 July	Live Wires^{#}	
3 July	The Big Town Round-Up	
17 July	Maid of the West^{#}	
24 July	Lovetime^{#}	
7 August	After Your Own Heart^{#}	
14 August	Play Square ^{#}	
14 August	Over the Hill to the Poorhouse	
21 August	Singing River^{#}	
21 August	To a Finish^{#}	
21 August	Ever Since Eve^{#}	
28 August	Hickville to Broadway^{#}	
4 September	A Virgin Paradise^{#}	
11 September	The Primal Law^{#}	
11 September	What Love Will Do^{#}	
11 September	A Connecticut Yankee in King Arthur's Court^{#}	Reels 2, 4 and 7 extant.
18 September	The Night Horsemen	
25 September	Little Miss Hawkshaw^{#}	
2 October	Thunderclap ^{#}	
2 October	Bar Nothin'^{#}	
2 October	The Lady from Longacre^{#}	
9 October	Queenie^{#}	
13 October	Cinderella of the Hills^{#}	
16 October	Shame^{#}	
30 October	The Rough Diamond^{#}	
30 October	Perjury^{#}	
6 November	Buckling the Line^{#}	
13 November	Riding with Death^{#}	
13 November	Desert Blossoms^{#}	
13 November	Footfalls^{#}	
20 November	The Devil Within^{#}	
20 November	The Jolt ^{#}	
27 November	The Last Trail^{#}	
27 November	Jackie^{#}	
11 December	The Queen of Sheba^{#}	17 seconds exist
11 December	Trailin'	
11 December	Whatever She Wants^{#}	
11 December	The Roof Tree^{#}	

=== 1922 ===
Release date	Title	Notes
1 January	Any Wife^{#}	
8 January	Winning with Wits^{#}	
15 January	Little Miss Smiles^{#}	
15 January	Sky High	Inducted into the National Film Registry in 1998.
22 January	Gleam o'Dawn^{#}	
5 February	The Strength of the Pines^{#}	
5 February	Smiles Are Trumps^{#}	
19 February	The Broadway Peacock^{#}	
26 February	Chasing the Moon^{#}	
5 March	Pardon My Nerve!^{#}	
5 March	A Stage Romance ^{#}	
5 March	Extra! Extra!^{#}	
19 March	Iron to Gold^{#}	
19 March	The Ragged Heiress^{#}	
4 April	Up and Going^{#}	
4 April	Elope If You Must^{#}	
9 April	Arabian Love^{#}	
16 April	Without Fear^{#}	
22 April	Money to Burn^{#}	
23 April	Western Speed^{#}	
30 April	Very Truly Yours^{#}	
7 May	Shackles of Gold^{#}	
14 May	The Fighting Streak	
21 May	The Men of Zanzibar	
21 May	The Yellow Stain^{#}	
28 May	Strange Idols^{#}	
4 June	Roughshod^{#}	
11 June	Lights of the Desert^{#}	
18 June	For Big Stakes	
25 June	A Self-Made Man^{#}	
16 July	Trooper O'Neill^{#}	
13 August	Oath-Bound^{#}	
20 August	The New Teacher#	
20 August	The Fast Mail^{#}	
27 August	Moonshine Valley^{#}	
27 August	Honor First^{#}	
27 August	Silver Wings^{#}	
30 August	Just Tony	
3 September	Monte Cristo	
3 September	West of Chicago^{#}	
7 September	Nero^{#}	
10 September	A Fool There Was^{#}	
10 September	The Crusader#	
24 September	The Yosemite Trail^{#}	
1 October	Youth Must Have Love^{#}	
1 October	Do and Dare^{#}	
8 October	Calvert's Valley^{#}	
15 October	Bells of San Juan^{#}	
22 October	Mixed Faces^{#}	
29 October	Without Compromise^{#}	
29 October	My Friend the Devil^{#}	
2 November	The Village Blacksmith#	1 reel exists
12 November	The Love Gambler^{#}	
12 November	Shirley of the Circus^{#}	
19 November	Tom Mix in Arabia ^{#}	
19 November	While Justice Waits^{#}	
26 November	The Boss of Camp 4^{#}	
26 November	Who Are My Parents?^{#}	
3 December	The Great Night^{#}	
10 December	The Lights of New York^{#}	
21 December	Monna Vanna	Produced in Germany. US distribution only
24 December	A California Romance^{#}	
31 December	Pawn Ticket 210^{#}	
31 December	Catch My Smoke^{#}	

=== 1923 ===
Release date	Title	Notes
1 January	A Friendly Husband	
1 January	The Custard Cup^{#}	
1 January	The Face on the Bar-Room Floor^{#}	
1 January	The Village Blacksmith^{#}	
7 January	Three Who Paid^{#}	
14 January	The Footlight Ranger^{#}	
21 January	Man's Size^{#}	
28 January	Brass Commandments^{#}	
11 February	The Town That Forgot God^{#}	
11 February	Romance Land	
18 February	Truxton King^{#}	
18 February	The Buster^{#}	
11 March	Good-By Girls!^{#}	
25 March	Three Jumps Ahead^{#}	
1 April	Bucking the Barrier^{#}	
8 April	Madness of Youth^{#}	
15 April	Lovebound^{#}	
22 April	Snowdrift^{#}	
6 May	Boston Blackie^{#}	
13 May	Stepping Fast#	
22 July	Skid Proof	
19 August	Alias the Night Wind^{#}	
19 August	If Winter Comes^{#}	
23 August	The Man Who Won^{#}	
26 August	Soft Boiled	
26 August	Second Hand Love^{#}	
2 September	The Eleventh Hour^{#}	
2 September	The Gunfighter^{#}	
9 September	The Silent Command	Lugosi's first American film
9 September	The Lone Star Ranger^{#}	
16 September	Monna Vanna	Produced in Germany. US distribution only
23 September	Hell's Hole^{#}	
30 September	St. Elmo^{#}	
7 October	Times Have Changed^{#}	
7 October	Does It Pay?^{#}	
14 October	The Exiles^{#}	
14 October	The Grail^{#}	
21 October	Big Dan	
21 October	Cameo Kirby	
28 October	No Mother to Guide Her^{#}	
4 November	Six Cylinder Love^{#}	
11 November	The Temple of Venus^{#}	
18 November	North of Hudson Bay	
18 November	Mile-a-Minute Romeo^{#}	
25 November	The Shepherd King^{#}	
25 November	When Odds Are Even^{#}	
2 December	Kentucky Days^{#}	
2 December	The Net^{#}	
9 December	You Can't Get Away with It^{#}	
16 December	Cupid's Fireman^{#}	
16 December	Hoodman Blind^{#}	
23 December	Gentle Julia^{#}	
30 December	Eyes of the Forest	
30 December	This Freedom#	Produced in the UK. US distribution only
30 December	The Governor's Lady^{#}	

=== 1924 ===
Release date	Title	Notes
20 January	Just Off Broadway^{#}	
27 January	Not a Drum Was Heard^{#}	
3 February	The Blizzard	Incomplete printe extant.
3 February	Ladies to Board^{#}	
10 February	Love Letters^{#}	
17 February	The Wolf Man^{#}	
27 February	The Shadow of the Desert^{#}	
9 March	The Vagabond Trail^{#}	
23 March	The Arizona Express	
23 March	A Man's Mate^{#}	
30 March	The Plunderer^{#}	
4 May	The Trouble Shooter	
11 May	The Circus Cowboy^{#}	
18 May	The Lone Chance^{#}	
22 June	Western Luck#	
29 June	Romance Ranch^{#}	
17 July	The Man Who Came Back	Sound version made in 1931. Incomplete print extant.
20 July	The Heart Buster^{#}	
27 July	Against All Odds^{#}	
17 August	That French Lady^{#}	
24 August	The Desert Outlaw	
24 August	The Last of the Duanes	
28 August	The Iron Horse	Inducted into the National Film Registry in 2011.
31 August	It Is the Law^{#}	
7 September	Dante's Inferno	
14 September	The Cyclone Rider	
21 September	Oh, You Tony!	
28 September	Honor Among Men^{#}	
28 September	The Painted Lady#	
5 October	Hearts of Oak^{#}	
5 October	Great Diamond Mystery^{#}	
12 October	Winner Take All^{#}	
12 October	The Warrens of Virginia^{#}	
19 October	Gerald Cranston's Lady^{#}	
26 October	Darwin Was Right^{#}	
2 November	The Last Man on Earth	
2 November	Teeth	
3 November	Gold Heels	
9 November	Daughters of the Night^{#}	
16 November	My Husband's Wives^{#}	
17 November	The Brass Bowl^{#}	
23 November	The Man Who Played Square^{#}	
30 November	Flames of Desire^{#}	
30 November	The Roughneck^{#}	
7 December	Troubles of a Bride^{#}	
7 December	The Deadwood Coach^{#}	
28 December	Curlytop^{#}	
28 December	In Love with Love	

=== 1925 ===
Release date	Title	Notes
4 January	The Arizona Romeo^{#}	
4 January	Ports of Call^{#}	
11 January	The Dancers	
1 February	Dick Turpin	
8 February	The Folly of Vanity	
8 February	The Star Dust Trail^{#}	
22 February	The Champion of Lost Causes^{#}	
22 February	The Trail Rider^{#}	
15 March	Riders of the Purple Sage	
22 March	The Scarlet Honeymoon^{#}	
22 March	The Hunted Woman^{#}	
29 March	Marriage in Transit^{#}	
5 April	Gold and the Girl^{#}	
12 April	Wings of Youth^{#}	
12 April	She Wolves^{#}	
24 May	The Rainbow Trail	
24 May	Scandal Proof^{#}	
31 May	The Kiss Barrier^{#}	
7 June	Every Man's Wife^{#}	
7 June	Hearts and Spurs^{#}	
26 July	Greater Than a Crown	
23 August	Lightnin'	
30 August	The Lucky Horseshoe	
6 September	Kentucky Pride	
13 September	The Man Without a Country#	
20 September	The Wheel^{#}	
20 September	The Timber Wolf^{#}	
27 September	Havoc	
11 October	Thunder Mountain^{#}	5 minutes exists
11 October	The Everlasting Whisper^{#}	
18 October	The Fighting Heart^{#}	
25 October	The Winding Stair^{#}	
1 November	Durand of the Bad Lands^{#}	
1 November	Thank You^{#}	
8 November	Lazybones	
15 November	The Fool^{#}	
22 November	East Lynne	
29 November	The Best Bad Man	
6 December	When the Door Opened^{#}	
13 December	Wages for Wives^{#}	
13 December	The Desert's Price^{#}	
20 December	The Ancient Mariner^{#}	
27 December	The Golden Strain	

=== 1926 ===
Release date	Title	Notes
3 January	The Gilded Butterfly^{#}	
10 January	The Palace of Pleasure^{#}	
10 January	The Yankee Señor^{#}	Fragments exist
17 January	The Outsider^{#}	
24 January	The First Year	
31 January	The Cowboy and the Countess	
7 February	The Road to Glory^{#}	Howard Hawks's first film.
28 February	My Own Pal^{#}	
28 February	The Johnstown Flood	
7 March	The Dixie Merchant^{#}	
14 March	Hell's 400^{#}	Technicolor Sequences.
28 March	Siberia^{#}	
4 April	The Fighting Buckaroo^{#}	
11 April	Rustling for Cupid^{#}	
11 April	Sandy	
18 April	Tony Runs Wild	
25 April	Yellow Fingers	
25 April	Early to Wed^{#}	
2 May	The Shamrock Handicap	
9 May	A Man Four-Square^{#}	
30 May	Black Paradise	
6 June	Hard Boiled	
6 June	A Trip to Chinatown^{#}	
13 June	More Pay, Less Work	
13 June	The Silver Treasure^{#}	
27 June	The Gentle Cyclone^{#}	
8 August	Honesty – The Best Policy#	
22 August	Fig Leaves	Technicolor Sequences.
28 August	3 Bad Men	
29 August	The Family Upstairs#	
29 August	No Man's Gold	
5 September	The Flying Horseman	
5 September	Marriage License?	
12 September	The Blue Eagle	Incomplete print extant.
19 September	Womanpower^{#}	
3 October	The Lily#	
10 October	The Midnight Kiss^{#}	
17 October	The Great K & A Train Robbery	
17 October	The Country Beyond^{#}	
24 October	Whispering Wires	
31 October	30 Below Zero^{#}	
7 November	The Return of Peter Grimm	
14 November	The City^{#}	
28 November	Wings of the Storm#	
5 December	The Canyon of Light^{#}	
12 December	Going Crooked	
19 December	Bertha, the Sewing Machine Girl^{#}	
26 December	Summer Bachelors	
26 December	Desert Valley	

=== 1927 ===
Release date	Title	Notes
2 January	One Increasing Purpose	
9 January	Stage Madness^{#}	
16 January	The Auctioneer#	
21 January	What Price Glory?	Synchronized Score. First Fox Movietone sound-on-film feature.
23 January	The Music Master^{#}	
23 January	The Last Trail	
30 January	Upstream	
6 February	The War Horse	
13 February	Marriage^{#}	
20 February	The Monkey Talks	
27 February	Ankles Preferred	
3 March	Love Makes 'Em Wild^{#}	
13 March	The Broncho Twister^{#}	
20 March	Whispering Sage#	
3 April	Madame Wants No Children#	
1 May	Hills of Peril^{#}	
8 May	Outlaws of Red River^{#}	
8 May	The Heart of Salome^{#}	
15 May	Is Zat So?^{#}	
22 May	Rich But Honest^{#}	
5 June	Cradle Snatchers	Survives Incomplete (Library of Congress). Reel 3 Incomplete; Reel 4 Lost.
5 June	Slaves of Beauty^{#}	
12 June	Good as Gold#	
19 June	The Secret Studio^{#}	
26 June	The Circus Ace	
3 July	Colleen	
27 July	Married Alive^{#}	
14 August	Chain Lightning#	
14 August	Paid to Love	
21 August	Tumbling River^{#}	
21 August	Singed	
4 September	The Loves of Carmen	Synchronized Score version released in 1928.
10 September	7th Heaven	Synchronized Score. Nominee for the first Academy Award for Best Picture. Inducted into the National Film Registry in 1995.
11 September	Two Girls Wanted^{#}	
18 September	The Joy Girl	Part-Technicolor
25 September	Black Jack^{#}	
25 September	The Gay Retreat	
2 October	Publicity Madness^{#}	
2 October	Silver Valley^{#}	
9 October	East Side, West Side	
16 October	High School Hero^{#}	
23 October	Pajamas^{#}	
4 November	Sunrise: A Song of Two Humans	Synchronized Score. Inducted into the National Film Registry in 1989. Winner of Oscar for Best Artistic Quality of Production
6 November	Very Confidential^{#}	
13 November	Blood Will Tell^{#}	
20 November	Ladies Must Dress^{#}	
20 November	The Arizona Wildcat^{#}	
27 November	Wolf Fangs#	
11 December	The Wizard^{#}	
11 December	Silk Legs^{#}	
25 December	Come to My House^{#}	

=== 1928 ===
Release date	Title	Notes
1928	Vampire a la Mode	
1 January	The Gateway of the Moon^{#}	
8 January	The Branded Sombrero^{#}	
8 January	Woman Wise^{#}	
15 January	Sharp Shooters	
15 January	Daredevil's Reward^{#}	
22 January	Mother Machree^{#}	Synchronized Score. Reels 3, 4 & 6 are lost.
5 February	Soft Living	
13 February	Four Sons	Synchronized Score.
26 February	A Girl in Every Port	
4 March	Square Crooks	
11 March	A Horseman of the Plains^{#}	
18 March	Dressed to Kill	
25 March	Why Sailors Go Wrong	
8 April	Love Hungry	
9 April	Street Angel	Synchronized Score.
22 April	The Play Girl^{#}	
29 April	The Escape	
6 May	Honor Bound	
13 May	Hello Cheyenne^{#}	
13 May	Hangman's House	
20 May	A Thief in the Dark^{#}	
27 May	News Parade#	
3 June	Don't Marry#	
4 June	Fazil	Synchronized Score.
10 June	No Other Woman^{#}	
10 June	Wild West Romance	
17 June	Chicken A La King^{#}	
24 June	Fleetwing^{#}	
25 June	The Red Dance	Synchronized Score.
1 July	Painted Post	
5 July	Road House#	
15 July	The Cowboy Kid#	
5 August	None but the Brave^{#}	Technicolor Sequences.
26 August	The River Pirate	Synchronized Score.
16 September	Win That Girl^{#}	Synchronized Score.
16 September	Mother Knows Best^{#}	Part-talkie First Fox Movietone Part-Talking film.
23 September	Plastered in Paris^{#}	Synchronized music score and sound effects.
30 September	The Air Circus^{#}	Part-Talkie. Silent version extant.
3 October	4 Devils #	Synchronized Score and sound effects
7 October	Dry Martini	Synchronized Score.
14 October	Me, Gangster^{#}	Synchronized Score.
28 October	The Farmer's Daughter#	
11 November	Romance of the Underworld	Synchronized Score.
18 November	Prep and Pep^{#}	Synchronized Score.
18 November	Taking a Chance#	Last mainstream silent film released by Fox
25 November	Riley the Cop	Synchronized Score.
9 December	Blindfold^{#}	Synchronized Score.
16 December	Homesick#	Synchronized Score.
22 December	The River#	Part-Talkie. Fragments survive.
23 December	Red Wine^{#}	Synchronized Score.
25 December	In Old Arizona	All-Talkie. First Fox Movietone All-Talking film. Nominee for the Academy Award for Best Picture.
30 December	The Great White North aka Lost In The Arctic#	Part-Talkie (Talking Prologue). Documentary

=== 1929 ===
Release date	Title	Notes
6 January	Captain Lash	Synchronized Score.
20 January	True Heaven#	Synchronized Score.
27 January	Fugitives#	Synchronized Score.
10 February	The Sin Sister^{#}	Synchronized Score.
17 February	Making the Grade	Part-Talkie.
24 February	New Year's Eve^{#}	Synchronized Score.
24 February	The Ghost Talks^{#}	All-Talkie.
3 March	Strong Boy ^{#}	Synchronized Score. Trailer survives
8 March	Speakeasy^{#}	All-Talkie.
10 March	Hearts in Dixie	All-Talkie.
17 March	Blue Skies#	Synchronized Score.
24 March	Girls Gone Wild^{#}	Synchronized Score.
31 March	Trent's Last Case	Synchronized Score.
7 April	Not Quite Decent^{#}	Part-Talkie.
14 April	Thru Different Eyes	All-Talkie. Silent version extant.
14 April	The Veiled Woman#	Synchronized Score.
21 April	The Woman from Hell ^{#}	Synchronized Score.
28 April	The Far Call^{#}	Synchronized Score.
5 May	Protection^{#}	Synchronized Score.
8 May	The Black Watch	All-Talkie.
12 May	Joy Street^{#}	Synchronized Score.
19 May	The Valiant	All-Talkie.
26 May	Fox Movietone Follies of 1929^{#}	All-Talkie. Multicolor Sequences. First Fox Grandeur 70mm widescreen film. Fragments survive.
2 June	The One Woman Idea^{#}	Synchronized Score.
9 June	The Exalted Flapper^{#}	Synchronized Score.
15 June	4 Devils^{#}	Part-Talkie.
23 June	Masked Emotions^{#}	Synchronized Score.
30 June	Behind That Curtain	All-Talkie.
7 July	Black Magic^{#}	Synchronized Score.
7 July	Pleasure Crazed^{#}	All-Talkie.
14 July	Masquerade^{#}	All-Talkie.
4 August	Chasing Through Europe^{#}	Synchronized Score. Last Synchronized Score film made by Fox.
18 August	Lucky Star	Part-Talkie. Silent version extant.
18 August	Words and Music^{#}	All-Talkie.
25 August	Why Leave Home?^{#}	All-Talkie.
1 September	Salute	All-Talkie.
7 September	Big Time	All-Talkie.
17 September	Happy Days	All-Talkie. Fox Grandeur. Full screen version extant.
18 September	They Had to See Paris	All-Talkie.
22 September	The Girl from Havana^{#}	All-Talkie.
3 October	Sunny Side Up	All-Talkie. Multicolor Sequences. Black and white version extant.
13 October	Frozen Justice^{#}	All-Talkie. Fragments of the silent version survive.
20 October	The Cock-Eyed World	All-Talkie.
27 October	Married in Hollywood^{#}	All-Talkie. Multicolor Sequences. Multicolor sequences extant (UCLA).
3 November	Love, Live and Laugh^{#}	All-Talkie.
10 November	A Song of Kentucky^{#}	All-Talkie.
11 November	Romance of the Rio Grande^{#}	All-Talkie.
24 November	Nix on Dames^{#}	All-Talkie.
1 December	Seven Faces^{#}	All-Talkie.
8 December	South Sea Rose^{#}	All-Talkie.
15 December	Christina^{#}	Part-Talkie.
22 December	Hot for Paris^{#}	All-Talkie.

== 1930s ==
=== 1930 ===
Release date	Title	Notes
5 January	The Lone Star Ranger	All-Talkie. International Sound Version extant.
12 January	Cameo Kirby	All-Talkie.
19 January	Harmony at Home	All-Talkie.
26 January	The Sky Hawk	All-Talkie.
2 February	Let's Go Places^{#}	All-Talkie.
9 February	Men Without Women	All-Talkie. International Sound Version extant.
16 February	City Girl	Part-Talkie. Last Part-Talkie made by Fox; Silent version extant.
23 February	The Big Party #	All-Talkie. All subsequent features were all talking
9 March	Such Men Are Dangerous	
16 March	The Golden Calf#	
23 March	High Society Blues	
30 March	Crazy That Way^{#}	
6 April	The Three Sisters	
13 April	Temple Tower	
20 April	Double Cross Roads	
27 April	The Arizona Kid	
4 May	Fox Movietone Follies of 1930	Multicolor Sequences.
11 May	Born Reckless	
18 May	On the Level	
25 May	Not Damaged	
1 June	Women Everywhere	
8 June	So This Is London	
15 June	Rough Romance	
22 June	Cheer Up and Smile	
29 June	Good Intentions	
6 July	Wild Company	
13 July	One Mad Kiss#	
17 August	Common Clay	
24 August	Man Trouble	
31 August	Last of the Duanes	
7 September	Song o' My Heart	Fox Grandeur.
14 September	On Your Back	
21 September	The Sea Wolf	
28 September	Soup to Nuts	First film appearance of The Three Stooges.
5 October	Liliom	
12 October	Up the River	
19 October	Scotland Yard	
26 October	Renegades	
1 November	The Big Trail	Fox Grandeur. Inducted into the National Film Registry in 2006.
9 November	The Dancers	
16 November	A Devil with Women	
23 November	Just Imagine	
7 December	Lightnin'	
14 December	Oh, For a Man!	
21 December	The Princess and the Plumber	
28 December	Part Time Wife	
30 December	Under Suspicion	

=== 1931 ===
Release date	Title	Notes
11 January	The Man Who Came Back	
18 January	Men on Call	
25 January	Once a Sinner	
1 February	Fair Warning	
8 February	Girls Demand Excitement	
15 February	Don't Bet on Women	
22 February	Body and Soul	
8 March	East Lynne	Nominee for the Academy Award for Best Picture
8 March	Not Exactly Gentlemen	
15 March	Doctors' Wives	
22 March	Mr. Lemon of Orange	
29 March	Seas Beneath	
30 March	The Big Trail	
5 April	A Connecticut Yankee	
12 April	Charlie Chan Carries On	Spanish version extant.
19 April	Three Girls Lost	
26 April	The Spy	
3 May	Are You There?	
3 May	Quick Millions	
10 May	Six Cylinder Love	
17 May	Young Sinners	
24 May	Always Goodbye	
31 May	Women of All Nations	
7 June	Daddy Long Legs	
14 June	Annabelle's Affairs^{#}	1 reel exists
21 June	The Black Camel	
28 June	Goldie	
5 July	Hush Money	
12 July	Their Mad Moment	
19 July	A Holy Terror	
23 August	Young as You Feel	
30 August	Transatlantic	
6 September	Merely Mary Ann	
13 September	Bad Girl	Nominee for the Academy Award for Best Picture
20 September	The Brat	
25 September	Mamá	Spanish-language
27 September	The Spider	
4 October	Wicked	
11 October	Skyline	
18 October	Riders of the Purple Sage	
25 October	Sob Sister	
8 November	Heartbreak	
11 November	The Cisco Kid	
11 November	Ambassador Bill	
15 November	The Yellow Ticket	
29 November	Over the Hill	
6 December	Surrender	
13 December	Good Sport	
27 December	Delicious	

=== 1932 ===
Release date	Title	Notes
3 January	The Rainbow Trail	
10 January	Stepping Sisters	
17 January	Dance Team	
24 January	Charlie Chan's Chance^{#}	
7 February	The Silent Witness	
14 February	Cheaters at Play	
21 February	She Wanted a Millionaire	
28 February	The Gay Caballero	
6 March	Business and Pleasure	
13 March	After Tomorrow	
20 March	Disorderly Conduct	
27 March	Devil's Lottery	
3 April	Careless Lady	
10 April	Amateur Daddy	
17 April	Young America	
1 May	The Trial of Vivienne Ware	
8 May	While Paris Sleeps	
15 May	The Woman in Room 13	
22 May	Man About Town	
29 May	Society Girl	
12 June	Mystery Ranch	
19 June	Week Ends Only	
26 June	Bachelor's Affairs	
3 July	Rebecca of Sunnybrook Farm	
17 July	Almost Married	
24 July	The Cry of the World	Compilation of Movietone News World War I coverage.
31 July	The First Year	
7 August	Congorilla	Documentary
14 August	A Passport to Hell	
21 August	The Painted Woman	
4 September	Down to Earth	
18 September	Chandu the Magician	
8 October	Hat Check Girl	
9 October	Wild Girl	
16 October	Six Hours to Live	
23 October	Rackety Rax	
30 October	The Golden West	
6 November	Sherlock Holmes	
20 November	Tess of the Storm Country	
27 November	Call Her Savage	
2 December	Too Busy to Work	
4 December	Me and My Gal	
25 December	Handle with Care	

=== 1933 ===
Release date	Title	Notes
1 January	Robbers' Roost	
8 January	Second Hand Wife	
15 January	Hot Pepper	
15 January	Face in the Sky	
2 February	Dangerously Yours	
10 February	Infernal Machine	
10 February	State Fair	Nominee for the Academy Award for Best Picture. Inducted into the National Film Registry in 2014.
17 February	Smoke Lightning	
19 February	Primavera en Otoño	Spanish-language
24 February	Broadway Bad	
3 March	Humanity	
10 March	Sailor's Luck	
18 March	After the Ball	
24 March	Pleasure Cruise	
31 March	Bondage	
14 April	Hello, Sister!	
15 April	Cavalcade	Winner of the Academy Award for Best Picture.
21 April	Trick for Trick	
28 April	Zoo in Budapest	
12 May	The Warrior's Husband	
19 May	Adorable	
26 May	El Rey de los Gitanos	Spanish-language
26 May	Hold Me Tight	
27 May	Cuando el Amor Rie	Spanish-language
2 June	It's Great to Be Alive	
16 June	I Loved You Wednesday	
18 June	Una Viude Romántica	Spanish-language
23 June	Best of Enemies	
30 June	Arizona to Broadway	
7 July	Life in the Raw	
14 July	The Man Who Dared	
16 July	La Melodía Prohibida	Spanish-language
21 July	The Devil's in Love	
28 July	F.P.1	
11 August	Shanghai Madness	
18 August	Pilgrimage	
25 August	The Last Trail	
1 September	Paddy, the Next Best Thing	
8 September	The Good Companions	
15 September	Charlie Chan's Greatest Case#	
22 September	Doctor Bull	
29 September	My Weakness	
6 October	The Power and the Glory	Inducted into the National Film Registry in 2014.
20 October	The Worst Woman in Paris?	
21 October	Walls of Gold	
27 October	The Mad Game	
29 October	Yo, Tú y Ella	Spanish-language
3 November	Berkeley Square	
4 November	My Lips Betray	
17 November	Olsen's Big Moment	
24 November	Jimmy and Sally	
30 November	Hoop-La	
8 December	Smoky	
15 December	I Was a Spy	
22 December	Mr. Skitch	
29 December	As Husbands Go	

=== 1934 ===
Release date	Title	Notes
5 January	I Am Suzanne!	
12 January	Orient Express	
19 January	Frontier Marshall	
26 January	Sleepers East	
2 February	Carolina	
9 February	Ever Since Eve	
15 February	La ciudad de cartón	Spanish-language
16 February	Devil Tiger	
16 February	Hold That Girl	
23 February	I Believed in You	
2 March	David Harum	
9 March	Coming Out Party	
16 March	George White's Scandals	
23 March	Three on a Honeymoon	
24 March	On a Volé un Homme#	French-language
30 March	Bottoms Up	
6 April	Murder in Trinidad	
7 April	The Constant Nymph	
20 April	All Men Are Enemies	
27 April	Heart Song	
4 May	Stand Up and Cheer	
4 May	Such Women Are Dangerous	
5 May	La Cruz y la Espada	Spanish-language
11 May	Now I'll Tell	
12 May	Liliom	French-language
18 May	Change of Heart	
25 May	Springtime for Henry	
1 June	Call It Luck	
8 June	Wild Gold	
22 June	Baby Take a Bow	
28 June	The World Moves On	
29 June	She Learned About Sailors	
6 July	Charlie Chan's Courage#	
7 July	Granaderos del Amor	Spanish-language
20 July	Grand Canary	
27 July	Handy Andy	
30 July	The Cat's-Paw	
22 August	She Was a Lady	
24 August	Pursued	
29 August	Un Capitán de Cosacos	Spanish-language
31 August	Peck's Bad Boy	
7 September	Servants' Entrance	
14 September	Charlie Chan in London	
21 September	The Dude Ranger	
21 September	Love Time	
28 September	Judge Priest	
28 September	Caravan	
12 October	365 Nights in Hollywood	
15 October	Dos Más Uno, Dos	Spanish-language
26 October	Marie Galante	
2 November	Elinor Norton	
3 November	Gambling	
9 November	Hell in the Heavens	
16 November	The White Parade	Nominee for the Academy Award for Best Picture.
23 November	The First World War	Compilation of Movietone News World War I coverage.
23 November	Bachelor of Arts	
30 November	Las Fronteras del Amor	Spanish-language
13 December	Music in the Air	
21 December	Helldorado	
28 December	Bright Eyes	
30 December	Señora Casada Necesita Marido	Spanish-language

=== 1935 ===
Release date	Title	Notes
4 January	Lottery Lover	
8 January	Mystery Woman	
11 January	The County Chairman	
25 January	Charlie Chan in Paris	
1 February	Under Pressure	
8 February	Baboona	Documentary
15 February	One More Spring	
15 February	When a Man's a Man	
22 February	The Little Colonel	Part-Technicolor
27 February	The Great Hotel Murder	
1 March	¡Asegure a su Mujer!	Spanish-language
15 March	Julieta Compra un Hijo	Spanish-language
22 March	Life Begins at 40	
29 March	George White's 1935 Scandals	
12 April	It's a Small World	
15 April	Hard Luck Mary	German film
19 April	Spring Tonic	
3 May	Ladies Love Danger	
4 May	$10 Raise	
10 May	The Cowboy Millionaire	
17 May	Our Little Girl	
24 May	The Daring Young Man	
1 June	Under the Pampas Moon	
7 June	Doubting Thomas	
14 June	Black Sheep	
21 June	Charlie Chan in Egypt	
1 July	Hard Rock Harrigan	
5 July	Ginger	
19 July	Silk Hat Kid	
26 July	Curly Top	
2 August	The Farmer Takes a Wife	
9 August	Welcome Home	
10 August	Orchids to You	
16 August	Dressed to Thrill	
23 August	Dante's Inferno	
30 August	Redheads on Parade	
6 September	Angelina o el honor de un brigadier	Spanish-language
6 September	Steamboat Round the Bend	
13 September	The Gay Deception	
20 September	Thunder in the Night	
27 September	Thunder Mountain	
4 October	Here's to Romance	
14 October	Charlie Chan in Shanghai	
15 October	Rosa de Francia	Spanish-language
16 October	Way Down East	
18 October	This Is the Life	
25 October	Bad Boy	
1 November	Te Quiero con Locura	Spanish-language
1 November	Music Is Magic	
22 November	In Old Kentucky	
29 November	Navy Wife	Last film by Fox Film Corporation.

== Bibliography ==
- Solomon, Aubrey (2011). The Fox Film Corporation, 1915–1935: A History and Filmography. McFarland & Company. ISBN 978-0-7864-6286-5.
