= Snares of Paris =

- Directed by: Howard M. Mitchell
- Written by: Denison Clift
- Produced by: William Fox
- Starring: Madlaine Traverse; Charles Arling; Frank Leigh
- Cinematography: Walter Williams
- Production company: Fox Film
- Distributed by: Fox Film
- Release date: October 18, 1919
- Running time: 5 reels
- Country: USA
- Language: Silent (English intertitles)

Snares of Paris is a 1919 silent drama film directed by Howard M. Mitchell, based on an original story by Denison Clift. The film stars Madlaine Traverse, Charles Arling, and Frank Leigh. It was produced and distributed by Fox Film.

== Plot ==
Emile Coullard is a powerful French diplomat who is in the process of writing an important trade document that would heavily affect the political and economic future of France. Belloc, a stockbroker, wants to gain this information so he can make a profit using the stock market.

Emile's wife, Marguerite Coullard, is hostess of a grand social event, when she is called to the bedside of attorney De Brionne. After the party is over, Marguerite sneaks out of the house to meet him. De Brionne tells her that she must meet her illegitimate son that she bore in youth, that De Brionne took care of. Fresh out of a convent, she was betrayed by Belloc and is left with a son.

She leaves finds her son, Fernand, drinking absinthe in the Apache Cafe, which she is able to rescue him from, and he becomes Emile's secretary. In his attempts to gain information, Belloc is recognized by Marguerite as the father of her son, and he forces her to open a safe with the threat that he will reveal her past. Fernand intervenes, and Belloc falls through a window to his death. Emile returns home to his wife, with Fernand in her arms, and she tells her husband about her past.

== Cast ==
- Madlaine Traverse as Marguerite Coullard
- Charles Arling as Emile Coullard
- Frank Leigh as Belloc
- Jack Rollens as Fernand
- Josef Swickard as De Brionne (as Joseph Swickard)

== Reception ==
Wid's Filmdom gave the film a mixed review, calling the story "weak and fails to hold interest," though they praised the atmosphere and Madlaine Traverse's acting.

== Preservation ==
With no holdings located in archives, Snares of Paris is considered a lost film.
