= The Tattlers =

- Directed by: Howard M. Mitchell
- Written by: Denison Clift
- Starring: Madlaine Traverse
- Cinematography: Walter Williams
- Production company: Fox Film
- Distributed by: Fox Film
- Release date: April 1920
- Running time: 5 reels
- Country: USA
- Language: Silent (English intertitles)

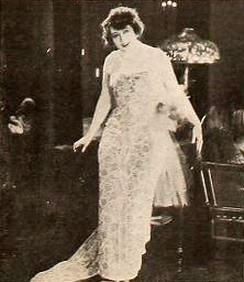
Still frame of Madlaine Traverse

The Tattlers is a lost 1920 American silent drama film directed by Howard M. Mitchell, starring Madlaine Traverse from a story by Denison Clift. The film also stars Ben Deely, Genevieve Blinn, and Elinor Hancock. It was produced and distributed by Fox Film.

== Plot ==
When Bess Rutherford's drunken husband embarrasses himself at a party, she divorces him out of humiliation. She accepts the advances of her longtime admirer James Carpenter and moves to New York with him, but he keeps pushing their wedding date further and further away.

Bess's son Jack discovers his mother's scandalous living conditions when his fiancée's mother, Mrs. Dexter, forces him to stop romancing her daughter Gladys. He confronts Carpenter about his lack of commitment, and it is revealed that he is also hoping to win Gladys' heart, behind his mother's back. They are engaged in a struggle and Carpenter is shot dead. Bess discovers the body, and in her hysteria, drinks poison. She wakes up from the scene and realizes that it was all a dream, and the story ends with her husband promising to not drink again.

== Cast ==
- Madlaine Traverse as Bess Rutherford
- Howard Scott as Charles Rutherford
- Jack Rollens as Jack Rutherford
- Ben Deely as James Carpenter
- Genevieve Blinn as Sally Smythe
- Elinor Hancock as Mrs. Reginald Dexter (as Eleanor Hancock)
- Correan Kirkham as Gladys Dexter
- Frank Whitson as Dr. Ballard
- Edwin Booth Tilton as Samuel Smythe

== Reception ==
Motion Picture News reviewer Matthew Taylor gave the film a negative review, finding it to be "crammed to excess with tears, sighs and screams of anguish." He found the cast to be "not above the average" and described Madlaine Traverse's acting as being "over-studied."

Wid's Filmdom's review was very negative, finding it poorly directed and several actors to be miscast. In the section advising theater owners on advertising, the reviewer stated "If you find yourself with this one all booked better slip it in very quietly and say little about it."

== Censorship ==
Initially, The Tattlers was rejected by the Kansas Board of Review in its entirety, but was passed later that same month with numerous cuts.

== Preservation ==
With no holdings located in archives, The Tattlers is considered a lost film.
