= Frank B. Good =

American cinematographer (1884–1939)

- Born: Frank Buchtel Good; October 3, 1884; Columbus, Ohio, U.S.
- Died: June 1, 1939 (aged 54); Los Angeles, California, U.S.
- Occupation: Cinematographer

Frank B. Good (1884–1939) was an American cinematographer who lensed more than 100 films between 1916 and 1937. He was known for working on Jackie Coogan productions and was an early member of the American Society of Cinematographers.

== Partial filmography ==
- Let Katie Do It (1916)
- Going Straight (1916)
- The Little School Ma'am (1916)
- Gretchen the Greenhorn (1916)
- Jack and the Beanstalk (1917)
- Aladdin and the Wonderful Lamp (1917)
- A Little Sister of Everybody (1918)
- Carolyn of the Corners (1919)
- The Love That Dares (1919)
- When Fate Decides (1919)
- Rose of the West (1919)
- The Web of Chance (1919)
- The Cyclone (1920)
- The Terror (1920)
- The Untamed (1920)
- Bar Nothing (1921)
- Bucking the Line (1921)
- Get Your Man (1921)
- Straight from the Shoulder (1921)
- Lights of the Desert (1922)
- Smiles Are Trumps (1922)
- The Great Alone (1922)
- The New Teacher (1922)
- Daddy (1923)
- Long Live the King (1923)
- A Boy of Flanders (1924)
- Little Robinson Crusoe (1924)
- The Wizard of Oz (1925)
- The Rag Man (1925)
- The Price of Success (1925)
- An Enemy of Men (1925)
- The Gilded Butterfly (1926)
- The Dixie Merchant (1926)
- Johnny Get Your Hair Cut (1927)
- The Wise Wife (1927)
- The Glorious Trail (1928)
- Fleetwing (1928)
- The California Mail (1929)
- Golden Dawn (1930)
- The Life of the Party (1930)
- Ghost Parade (1931)
- The Pharmacist (1933)
- Fighting to Live (1934)
- Peck's Bad Boy (1934)
- The Dude Ranger (1934)
- The Cowboy Millionaire (1935)
- Hard Rock Harrigan (1935)
- The Mine with the Iron Door (1936)
- The Border Patrolman (1936)
- Isle of Fury (1936)
- Daniel Boone (1936)
- Park Avenue Logger (1937)
- Hollywood Cowboy (1937)
- Windjammer (1937)
- The Road to Hollywood (1947)
