= The Danger Zone (1918 film) =

- Directed by: Frank Beal
- Screenplay by: Adrian Johnson; Denison Clift
- Story by: Marshall Bruce Bennington
- Starring: Madlaine Traverse; Thomas Holding; Fritzie Ridgeway; Ed Cecil
- Cinematography: Harry Gerstad; Dev Jennings
- Production company: Fox Film
- Distributed by: Fox Film
- Release date: December 29, 1918
- Running time: 5 reels
- Country: USA
- Language: Silent (English intertitles)

The Danger Zone is a 1918 American silent drama film directed by Frank Beal, starring Madlaine Traverse from a screenplay by Adrian Johnson and Denison Clift and story by Marshall Bruce Bennington. It also stars Thomas Holding, Fritzie Ridgeway, and Ed Cecil. The film was produced and distributed by Fox Film.

== Plot ==
The opera singer, Lola Dupre, marries Senator Fitzmaurice, concealing her unsavory past. Her former lover, Philip Whitney, finds her after a performance and demands money from her, or else will reveal her past to her new husband. Whitney becomes engaged to the senator's daughter, Marie, despite being warned off by Lola. During a reception, Whitney comes to Lola again for funds and attacks her, where she kills him in the struggle. Lola returns to the reception downstairs, not informing Marie of his death.

Marie discovers his body and becomes hysterical, where she is witnessed by a guest holding a knife over the corpse. To free Marie from suspicion, Lola confesses to the murder and his blackmail. She is brought before the jury, who acquit her on the plea "a woman's honor is her life." Lola and Marie return home to Fitzmaurice, where they continue their life without the influence of Whitney.

== Cast ==
- Madlaine Traverse as Lola Dupre
- Thomas Holding as Senator Fitzmaurice
- Fritzie Ridgeway as Marie Fitzmaurice
- Ed Cecil as Philip Whitney (as Edward Cecil)

== Production ==
A set was constructed at the Fox studio that was designed to be an exact replica of a room at The Breakers. Lola Dupre's theater scenes were filmed at the Majestic Theater in Los Angeles, where 600 extras were attired in evening dress. Additional scenes were filmed at the Midwick Country Club.

== Reception ==
The Film Daily gave the film a mixed review, describing the plot as having been "done to death by Theda Bara, Gladys Brockwell, Virginia Pearson," which Fox released before. The reviewer praised the acting of Madlaine Traverse, despite the poor photography.

Moving Picture World reviewer Walter K. Hill also gave the film a mixed review, finding Madlaine Traverse's performance acceptable, but her character is without "the vital note of sympathy."

== Censorship ==
The Kansas Board of Review initially rejected The Danger Zone in its entirety, but reviewed it a second time later in the year, where it passed with cuts. The censors required two intertitles discussing a woman's character to be removed from reel 1, the murder scene in reel 4 eliminated, and the struggle shortened.

== Preservation ==
With no holdings located in archives, The Danger Zone is considered a lost film.
