= The Caillaux Case (1918 film) =

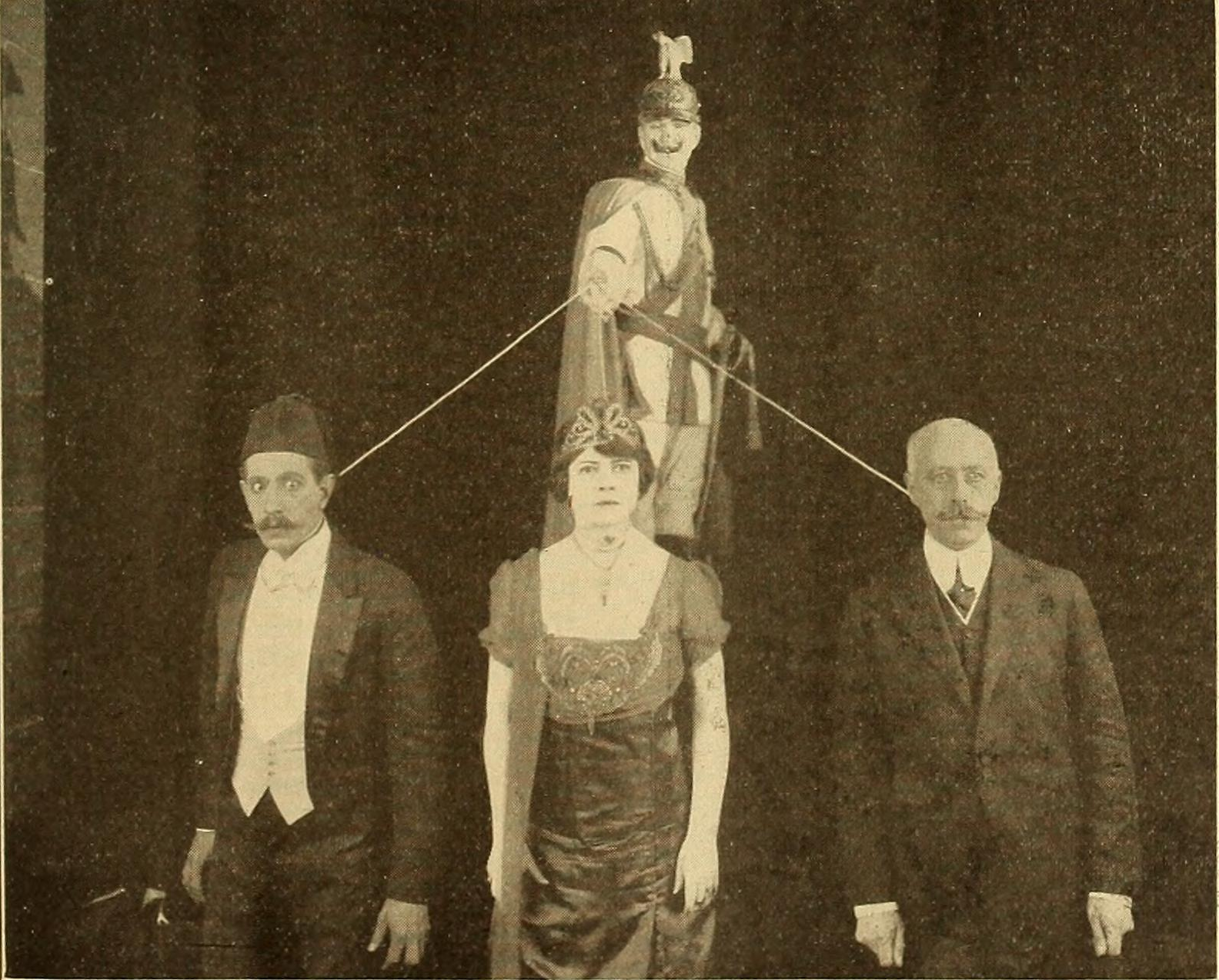
- Frank McGlynn Sr., George Majeroni, Madlaine Traverse, and Henry Warwick
- Directed by: Richard Stanton
- Written by: Adrian Johnson
- Produced by: William Fox
- Starring: Madlaine Traverse; George Majeroni
- Cinematography: Henry Cronjager
- Production company: Fox Film Corp.
- Distributed by: Fox Film Corp.
- Release date: September 15, 1918
- Running time: 7 reels
- Country: USA
- Language: Silent (English intertitles)

The Caillaux Case is a 1918 American silent drama film directed Richard Stanton, and starring Madlaine Traverse from a screenplay by Adrian Johnson. The film was based on the real story of Bolo Pasha, a German agent who was executed only months before the release of the film. It was produced and distributed by Fox Film Corporation.

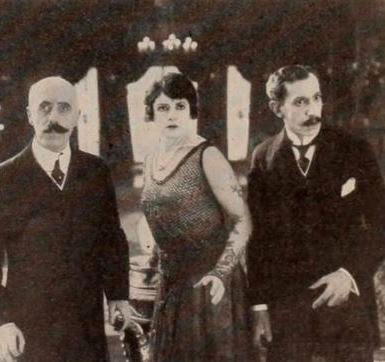
Henry Warwick, Madlaine Traverse, and George Majeroni

== Plot ==
Against her father's wishes, Henriette elopes with Leo Claretie, a journalist for the Parisian newspaper, Le Figaro. Over the course of nineteen years, Claretie continues to fail in his career, and Henriette becomes embittered.

She meets the French Minister of Finance, Joseph Caillaux, through Le Figaro editor, Gaston Calmette, and they form an immediate mutual attraction to on another. Caillaux visits her at home that night and she promises to marry him, whatever it may entail. Shortly afterwards, Caillaux obtains a divorce for both himself and Henriette. Distraught, Leo Claretie commits suicide and soon Caillaux and Henriette are married.

The "Great War" (World War I) begins, and the Kaiser's emissary, Bolo Pasha, offers Caillaux a large sum of money if he brings a separate peace between Imperial Germany and France. Henriette sees a future for herself in this plan, her as queen and her husband as king. However, the plot is leaked to Le Figaro by one of Caillaux's political enemies, and he threatens to publish the information, but is shot five times by Henriette. Through her husband's influence, she is released.

Meanwhile, the German Ambassador to the United States leaves behind incriminating documents, exposing the entire plot between Pasha and Caillaux. The French government immediately arrests Caillaux and Pasha, and Henriette is stoned out of Paris. Caillaux is sent to prison and Pasha is executed.

== Cast ==
- Madlaine Traverse as Henriette Caillaux
- Henry Warwick as Joseph Caillaux
- George Majeroni as Bolo Pasha
- Eugene Ormonde as Gaston Calmette
- Philip Van Loan as Leo Claretie
- Emile La Croix as M. Renouard
- Norma McCloud as Germaine Claretie
- George Humbert as Albert Calmette
- Frank McGlynn Sr. as Emperor William of Germany

== Production ==
The mob scene in the courtroom was reported by Moving Picture World to be wildly out of control, leading to destruction of the set and battering Madlaine Traverse, all while being filmed. In addition to Traverse, a man and a woman were knocked unconscious, and another man had his head gashed. The violence was attributed to French extras, who had "pronounced opinions on the Caillaux affair."

Almost every scene in The Caillaux Case was completed by April of 1918, but release was delayed to allow the "publication of recent disclosures" by Bolo Pasha to the French government. The last scene to be filmed was Bolo Pasha's execution, which was shot at the Fox Studios in Fort Lee, immediately after news of his death.

This was Madlaine Traverse's final film before forming her own film company.

== Reception ==
The Film Daily's review was mostly positive, complementing the entire cast for their performances and commended the director for the "well-handled" court scenes. The reviewer had some criticism for "unnecessary" visions of the president and intertitles designed to draw "patriotic applause," which the reviewer found crude.

Motion Picture News reviewer P. S. Harrison described the film as carrying "an air of realism due to intelligent construction and good directing," and praised it for being "thrilling and entertaining." He criticized the film for depicting all five shots directed at the editor, saying that it was unnecessarily "brutal." Harrison also disliked the opening scene of a skull, believing it "unnecessary."

Moving Picture World reviewer Walter K. Hill gave the film a positive review, praising Madlaine Traverse for her performance and Fox Film Corp. for their timely release.

== Censorship ==
Before The Caillaux Case could be exhibited in Chicago, the Chicago Board of Censors required several scenes to be removed. One was during a love scene in reel 3, where Joseph Caillaux draws his hands slowly over Henriette's breasts and kisses her on the neck. Reel 5, part of an intertitle to be removed said "I will be your slave" and in a scene where the editor is shot, all but the first shot were to be cut.

The Kansas Board of Review required the elimination of Henriette and Caillaux's love scene in reel 3, for the film to be exhibited in Kansas.

== Preservation ==
With no holdings located in archives, The Caillaux Case is considered a lost film.
