= Adrian Johnson (screenwriter) =

American screenwriter

Adrian Owen Johnson (January 13, 1883 – September 14, 1964) was a prolific American screenwriter during the silent film era. Johnson wrote some of Fox Film's highest-grossing films. More than a dozen starred Theda Bara. His screenplay for Cleopatra depicted Antony and Cleopatra's love affair from the perspective of Hamarachi.

He copyrighted and sold an Adrian Johnson Photoplay System that brought "the fascinating profitable profession of screen writing to the very door of the person of average intelligence." The course included 20 lessons and a dictionary of terms. It promised to "make failure impossible."

== Filmography ==
- Romeo and Juliet (1916)
- The Tiger Woman (1917)
- Madame DuBarry (1917)
- Cleopatra (1917)
- Salomé (1918)
- The Soul of Buddha (1918)
- The Danger Zone (1918)
- The Caillaux Case (1918)
- The Forbidden Path (1918)
- Checkers (1919)
- Luck and Pluck (1919)
- When Men Desire (1919), adaptation of a J. Searle Dawley story
