= When Fate Decides =

1919 film by Harry F. Millarde

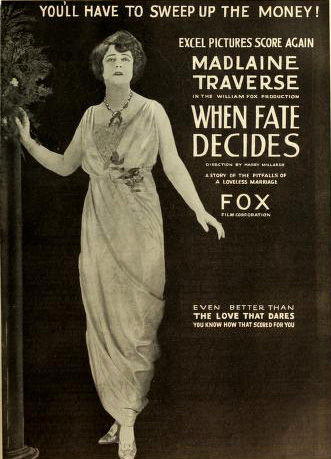
- Advertisement
- Directed by: Harry Millarde
- Written by: Denison Clift
- Based on: Evelyn Campbell's story
- Produced by: William Fox
- Starring: Madlaine Traverse
- Cinematography: Frank B. Good
- Production company: Fox Film Corporation
- Distributed by: Fox Film Corporation
- Release date: June 1, 1919
- Running time: 5 reels
- Country: United States
- Language: Silent (English intertitles)

When Fate Decides is a lost 1919 American silent drama film directed by Harry Millarde and starring Madlaine Traverse. It was produced and distributed by Fox Film Corporation.

== Plot ==
Vera Loudon is married to a violent alcoholic who beats her, but she meets a former lover who is furious with how she is being treated.

== Cast ==
- Madlaine Traverse as Vera Loudon
- William Conklin as Herbert Loudon
- Clyde Fillmore as Donald Cavendish
- Claire Du Brey as Alicia Carteret
- Henry Hebert as Harry Carteret (credited as Henry J. Herbert)
- John Cossar as Egan
- Genevieve Blinn as Mrs. Veriker
- Cordelia Callahan as Mathilde

== Reception ==
Motion Picture News reviewer Laurence Reid was mixed in their review, annoyed with the story, stating that it was only redeemed by its mystery element.

Moving Picture World reviewer Hanford C. Judson gave the film a very positive review, finding the direction to be "excellent" and the night cinematography "wonderful."

Variety's review was mostly positive, praising some of the cinematography, but the reviewer found that the performers overacted their parts.

== See also ==
- 1937 Fox vault fire
