= Lost Money (1919 film) =

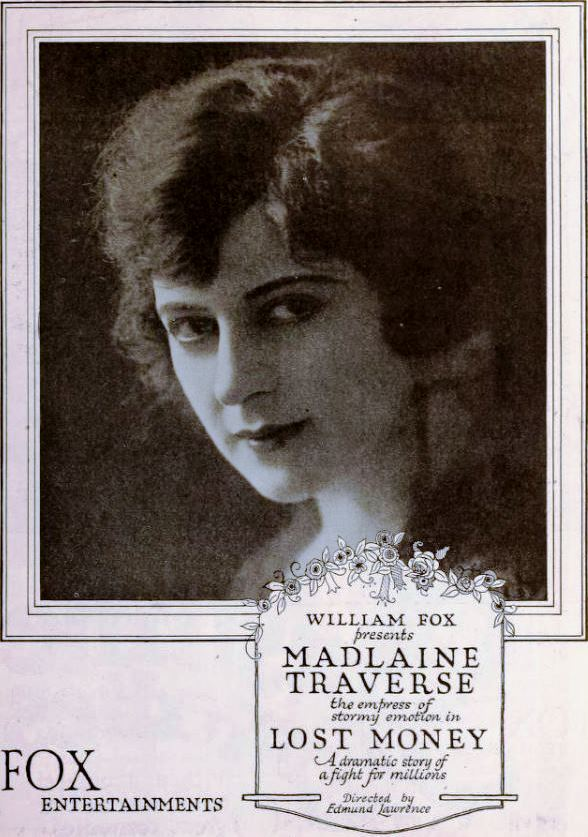
- Directed by: Edmund Lawrence
- Written by: Denison Clift
- Starring: Madlaine Traverse; George McDaniel; Henry Hebert; Edwin B. Tilton
- Cinematography: Walter Williams
- Production company: Fox Film
- Distributed by: Fox Film
- Release date: December 7, 1919
- Running time: 5 reels
- Country: USA
- Language: Silent (English intertitles)

Lost Money is a lost 1919 American silent drama film directed by Edmund Lawrence, starring Madlaine Traverse from a story by Denison Clift. The film also stars George McDaniel, Henry Herbert, and Edwin B. Tilton. It was produced and distributed by Fox Film.

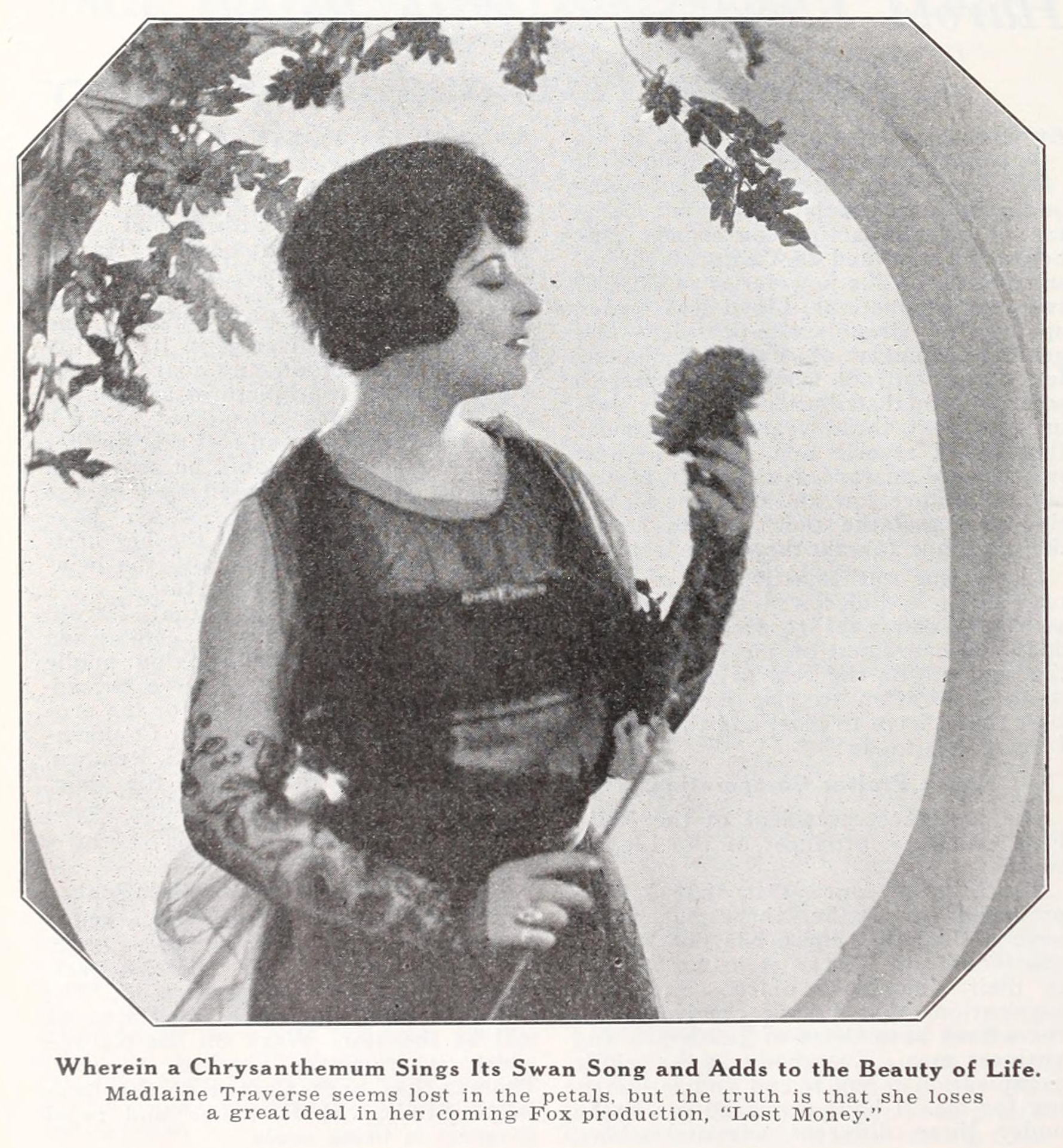
Madlaine Traverse

== Plot ==
Judith Atherstone is the spoiled daughter of Graham Atherstone, a wealthy Londoner who, unbeknownst to her, has lost most of his money on the London stock exchange. She agrees to journey to his South African bungalow, where he hopes to recoup his losses in the diamond fields.

Owner of the diamond mines, Ox Lanyon, receives word that some prospectors are lost in the jungle near the Umgeni River and being menaced by "Zulus." He assembles a rescue party to recover them, but before departing, he deeds his property to the Atherstones, in the case he is killed. He promises to come back for Judith, who accepts this vow as flattery.

After some time, Ox is believed dead, but he returns to find Graham Atherstone has taken Ox's fortune for himself. Furious, Ox forces Judith to come with him and they wander the desert for weeks. They are dying of thirst when Ox finds water and gives it to Judith, going without water himself. She finds him digging in sand, delirious and confessing his love to her. A Dutch family passing by give them water, saving their lives. The water-hole that Ox had discovered, is full of diamonds, and by the time Atherstone finds them, they have a wealth of diamonds in their possession. To save Ox's life, Judith claims to be his wife. She returns to her father, leaving Ox behind, but he is deeply in love with her, and follows after her.

A few days after her return, the abused mine workers revolt and light the Atherstone home on fire, and Graham Atherstone is wounded in the attack. Ox arrives with the cavalry and rescues them. Later, Atherstone returns Ox's property to him and the film fades out as Judith and Ox kiss.

== Cast ==
- Madlaine Traverse as Judith Atherstone
- George McDaniel as Ox Lanyon
- Henry Hebert as Caton Cooper
- Edwin B. Tilton as Graham Atherstone

== Production ==
Produced under the working title "The Heritage of Eden," filming began in September 1919, with exteriors shot on location at Cahuenga Canyon.

== Reception ==
Motion Picture News reviewer Tom Hamlin was positive towards the film, stating that the film is "well directed" and contained an "easy rhythm." He found that some of the performers, excluding Madlaine Traverse, overacted in most of their scenes.

Wid's Filmdom gave the film a mixed review, describing the story as "weak," and the plot "so old it should be given a comfortable home in an institution for the aged." The reviewer also stated that the exterior settings "Hardly looked like African country" and the photography was out of focus.

== Preservation ==
With no holdings located in archives, Lost Money is considered a lost film.
