= Demos (film) =

1921 British film by Denison Clift

- Directed by: Denison Clift
- Written by: George Gissing (novel)
- Starring: Milton Rosmer; Evelyn Brent; Warwick Ward
- Production company: Ideal Film Company
- Distributed by: Ideal Film Company
- Release date: 29 January 1921
- Running time: Five reels
- Country: United Kingdom
- Language: Silent

Demos is a 1921 silent British drama film directed by Denison Clift. The film is considered to be lost.

== Cast ==
- Milton Rosmer as Richard Mortimer
- Evelyn Brent as Emma Vine
- Warwick Ward as Willis Rodman
- Bettina Campbell as Adela Waltham
- Olaf Hytten as Daniel Dabbs
- Gerald McCarthy as Herbert Eldon
- Mary Brough as Mrs.Mortimer
- Haidee Wright as Mrs. Eldon
- Vivian Gibson as Alice Mortimer
- Daisy Campbell as Mrs. Waltham
- James G. Butt as Jim Cullen
- Leonard Robson as Longwood
