= Howard M. Mitchell =

American actor (1883–1958)

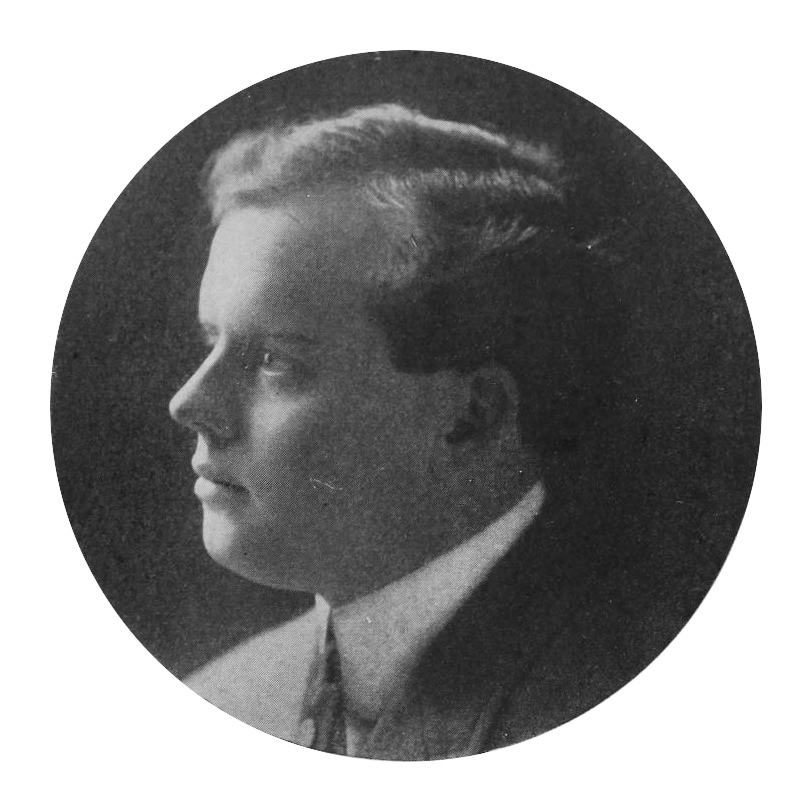
- Born: December 11, 1883; Pittsburgh, Pennsylvania, United States
- Died: October 9, 1958 (aged 74); Hollywood, California, United States
- Occupations: Actor; Film director
- Years active: 1910-1952

Howard M. Mitchell (December 11, 1883 – October 9, 1958) was an American actor and film director. He appeared in 270 films between 1910 and 1952 and directed 38 silent films between 1915 and 1927.

== Selected filmography ==
- The Shadow of Tragedy (1914, Short)
- The Beloved Adventurer (1914)
- The Road o' Strife (1915)
- The Great Ruby (1915)
- The Law That Divides (1918)
- The Splendid Sin (1919)
- Snares of Paris (1919)
- Faith (1920)
- Molly and I (1920)
- The Tattlers (1920)
- The Little Wanderer (1920)
- Flame of Youth (1920)
- Love's Harvest (1920)
- Wing Toy (1921)
- Cinderella of the Hills (1921)
- Queenie (1921)
- The Mother Heart (1921)
- Lovetime (1921)
- Ever Since Eve (1921)
- The Lamplighter (1921)
- The Great Night (1922)
- Man's Size (1923)
- Forgive and Forget (1923)
- Romance Ranch (1924)
- The Lone Chance (1924 - directed)
- The Jazz Girl (1926)
- Hidden Aces (1927)
- Thrill of a Lifetime (1937)
- Wild Money (1937)
- Tom Sawyer, Detective (1938)
- Irish Luck (1939)
- Killer at Large (1947)
