= The Spirit of Good =

1920 film

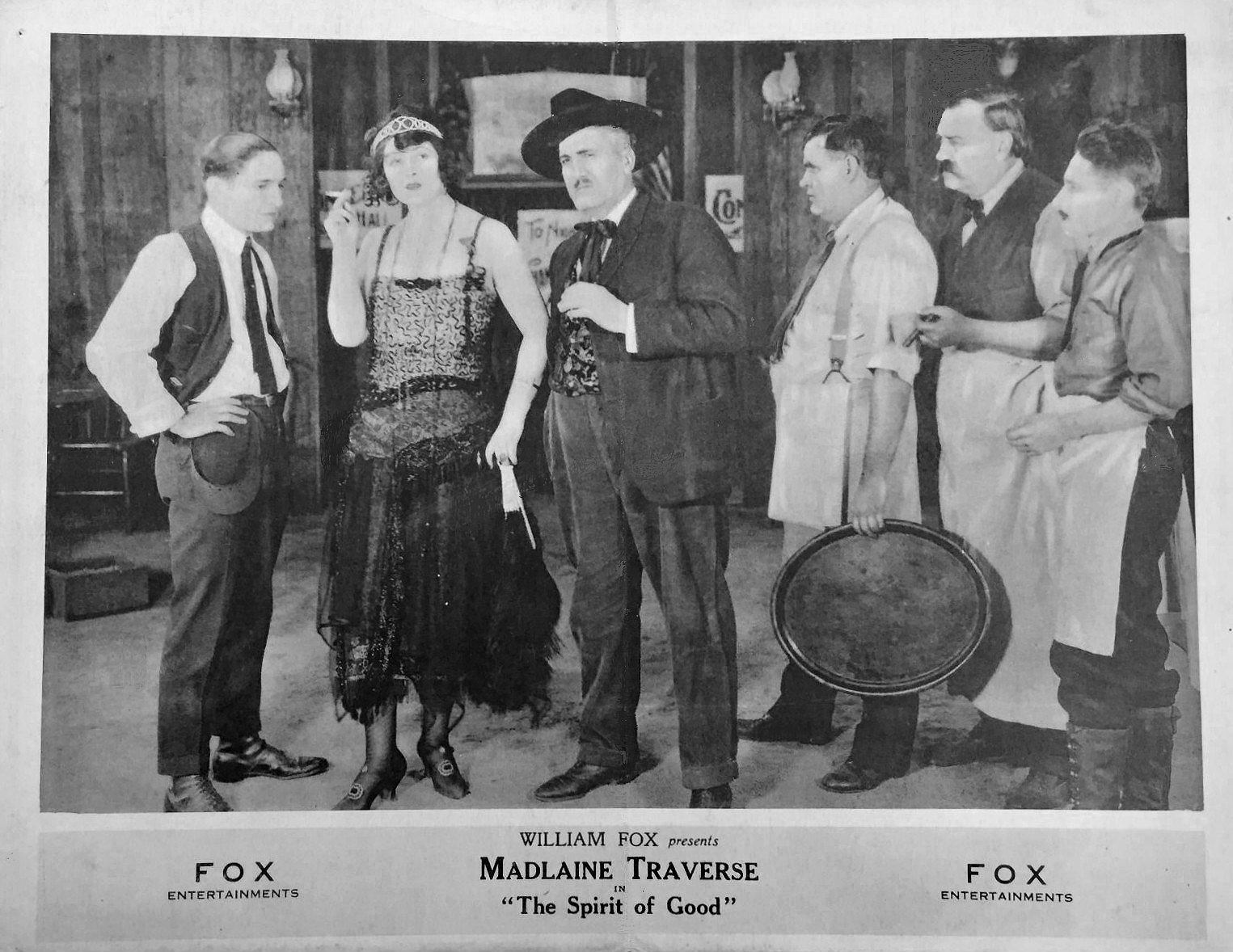
- Lobby card
- Directed by: Paul Cazeneuve
- Written by: Denison Clift
- Based on: a story by Clifford Howard and Burke Jenkins
- Produced by: William Fox
- Starring: Madlaine Traverse
- Cinematography: Walter Williams
- Production company: Fox Film Corporation
- Distributed by: Fox Film Corporation
- Release date: July 1920
- Running time: 5 reels
- Country: United States
- Language: Silent (English intertitles)

The Spirit of Good is a lost 1920 American silent drama film directed by Paul Cazeneuve and starring Madlaine Traverse. It was produced and distributed by Fox Film Corporation.

== Plot ==
Nell Gordon is a New York City chorus girl who finds out her new husband is already married, is horrified, and ventures West to a small desert town. She is working as a cabaret singer in a dingy dance hall, owned by Chuck Lang, under the name "Champagne Nell," when Reverend Josiah Calvin comes to town to spread the word of God.

The reverend holds meetings across the street from the dance hall, which is hampering Chuck Lang's business, and he persuades Nell to infiltrate the meetings under the pretense of converting. The reverend invites her to sing and she breaks into jazz song, much to the shock of the congregation. He asks her to sing "Where Is My Wandering Boy To-night?" and she does so, drawing the attention of Neal Bradford, who falls in love with Nell and converts. She is touched by his faith in her and converts as well. Neal, Nell, and the reverend unite in opposition against Lang. Nell pours out all the dance hall's booze and lights the whole building on fire.

== Cast ==
- Madlaine Traverse as Nell Gordon
- Fred R. Stanton as Neal Bradford (credited as Frederick Stanton)
- Dick La Reno as Chuck Lang
- Charles Smiley as Reverend Josiah Calvin
- Clo King as Jerusha Calvin
- Buck Jones (uncredited) (Buck Gebhart)

== Critical reception ==
Billboard reviewer Rae Victor described the film as "a picture without one feature to recommend it." The reviewer advised against booking it at all, and said to "substitute something else," as the film was unsuitable and had no entertainment value.

The Film Daily review was mostly negative, describing the story as being "Filled with sob-stuff, none of which will register as sincere before intelligent audience." When analyzing possible advertising strategies, the reviewer said "Neither the shaping of the story or the direction show any degree of modern skill" and advised against booking the film.

Motion Picture News reviewer Matthew A. Taylor had nothing positive to say about the film, leading his review by stating that the film had a "Wishy-washy, Trite Story." He described the intertitles as being "hackneyed, out-worn, and as familiar as the 'reform' plot itself" and the action poor. The review was concluded by saying that the film was not suited for a modern audience.

The Moving Picture World reviewer Robert C. McElravy gave the film a positive review, praising the cast and described the film as "melodramatic and emotional in the extreme, but it carries with it an undercurrent of genuine feeling."
