= The Splendid Sin =

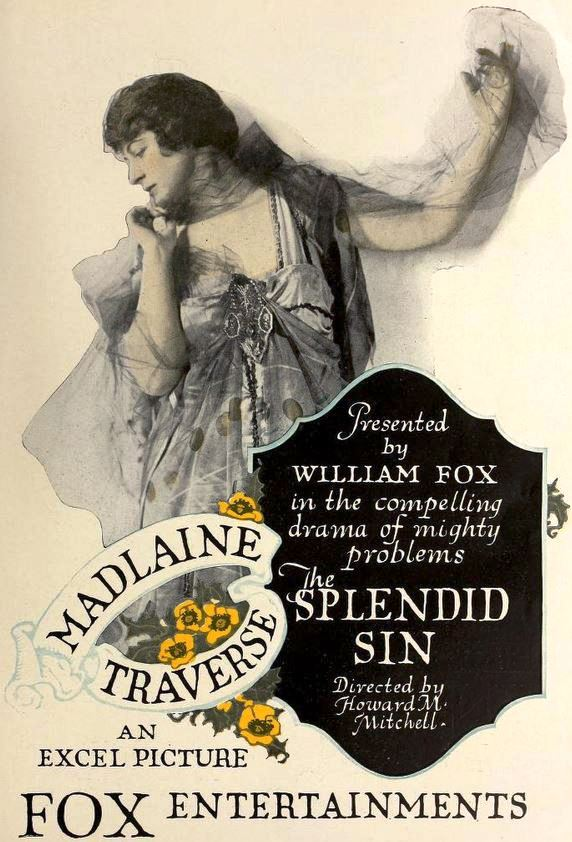
- Advertisement in Motion Picture News
- Directed by: Howard M. Mitchell
- Written by: Denison Clift; Emil Forst
- Starring: Madlaine Traverse; Charles Clary; Wheeler Oakman
- Cinematography: Walter Williams
- Production company: Fox Film Corp.
- Distributed by: Fox Film Corp.
- Release date: September 7, 1919
- Running time: 5 reels
- Country: USA
- Language: Silent (English intertitles)

The Splendid Sin is a lost 1919 American silent drama film directed by Howard M. Mitchell, and starring Madlaine Traverse from a screenplay by Denison Clift and story by Emil Forst. It was produced and distributed by Fox Film Corporation.

A wealthy woman claims her dead sister's child as her own, with the husband believing the child is hers.

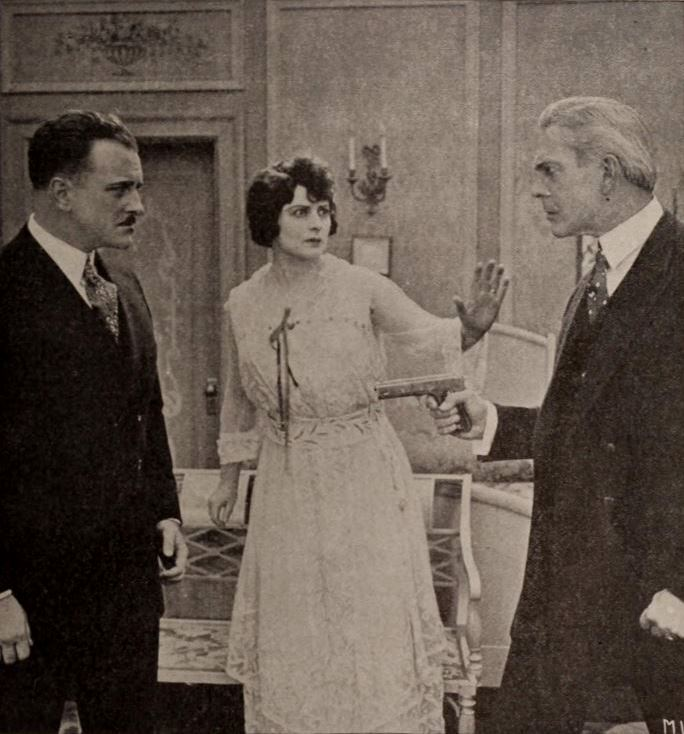
Wheeler Oakman, Madlaine Traverse, and Charles Clary

== Plot ==
Sir Charles Chatham and his wife Lady Marion Chatham are very fond of children, but are unable to have any. His mother, Dowager Lady St. Aubrey prefers this situation, as upon Sir Charles' death, his estate will go to her other son, rather than his wife.

Gertrude, sister of Sir Charles, is forced by a tremendous storm to seek refuge in an abandoned tower, with her fiancee Stephen Hartley. Terrified by the storm, she finds safety in her lover's arms. Shortly afterwards, he is sent on a diplomatic mission to Moscow, before he can marry Gertrude. His return is delayed by Bolshevist unrest, and Gertrude gives birth in his absence.

Gertrude hands the child over to Lady Marion while her husband is on a lengthy exploring trip, and she accepts it as her own. Soon after, Gertrude dies. Upon Sir Charles' return, he is elated to find that he has become a father in his absence, as Lady Marion does not disclose that the child is his sister's. Dowager Lady St. Aubrey reveals to Sir Charles that he is not the father, and that the baby is Hartley's, who had just returned from Moscow. He holds Hartley at gunpoint, and Marion confesses that the baby is her dead sister's, whereupon Sir Charles adopts the baby as his own.

== Cast ==
- Madlaine Traverse as Lady Marion Chatham
- Charles Clary as Sir Charles Chatham
- Jeanne Calhoun as Gertrude
- Wheeler Oakman as Stephen Hartley
- Elinor Hancock as The Dowager Lady St. Aubrey
- George Hackathorn as The Hon. George Granville
- Edwin Booth Tilton as Doctor Kent

== Production ==
Production was started in early July, 1919, and The Los Angeles Times claimed that she wore $15,000 worth of gowns for the picture.

== Reception ==
Motion Picture News reviewer Tom Hamlin gave the film a negative review, calling it "Not a very entertaining picture." The reviewer did not see Madlaine Traverse as "appealing" and found the film to lack suspense.

Wid's Daily gave the film a mixed review, finding the film's settings average and the "suspense often is killed because of the fact that forthcoming action is anticipated in many of the subtitles."

== Censorship ==
The Kansas Board of Review, one of six state film censorship boards, initially rejected the film in its entirety. Upon a second review, it was decided to remove several intertitles, add a few of their own intertitles, and shorten some scenes. Reel 1 intertitle "Dawn" was removed, and the scene of Gertrude and Stephen in the town was shortened. In reel 2, an intertitle was inserted saying "Promise me Marion you will keep our marriage a secret." Gertrude's confession to Marion in reel 3 was shortened. In reel 4, the intertitle of Marion asking Stephen to give up his son was removed, and an intertitle was added saying "Tomorrow I am going back to my wife - I'd like to see the doctor stop me."

== Preservation ==
With no holdings located in archives, The Splendid Sin is considered a lost film.

== External sites ==
- The Splendid Sin at IMDb
- The Splendid Sin at the AFI Catalog of Feature Films
