= Madlaine Traverse =

American actress (1875–1964)

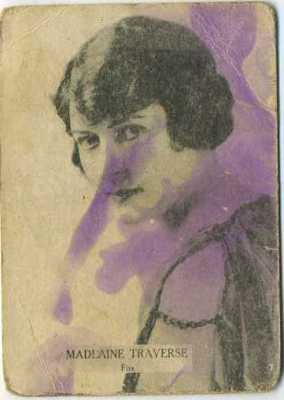
- lobby card, Madlaine Traverse
- Born: Mary Businsky; August 1, 1875; Cleveland, Ohio, US
- Died: January 7, 1964 (aged 88); Cleveland, Ohio, US
- Other names: Madeline Traverse; Madeline Travers; Madaline Traverse
- Occupation: actress
- Years active: 1913–1920
- Spouse: Max Traverse (died 1906)

Madlaine Traverse (born Mary Businsky; August 1, 1875 – January 7, 1964) was an American stage and screen actress. During the course of her career, she was alternately billed as "Madaline Traverse", "Madeline Traverse" and "Madeline Travers".

== Career ==
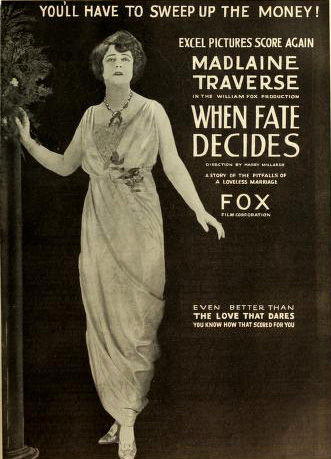
In When Fate Decides (1919)

Traverse was a leading lady of the Fox Film Corporation in the second decade of the twentieth century. In 1917 she played the mother of Mary Pickford in The Poor Little Rich Girl (1917). In What Would You Do? (1920) director Edmund Lawrence required Traverse to wear the clothes of a Boer woman of South Africa. Lawrence stressed realism to the point of insisting that Traverse not wash her face for several days before her scenes were shot.

Her most successful films are The Caillaux Case (1918) and Three Weeks (1914). In 1920 she made her first movie for Madlaine Traverse Productions, Snares of Paris (1919), in New York City. Her wardrobe for the motion picture was purchased in Paris and she stayed in Fort Lee, New Jersey while on location.

Traverse was rescued from drowning while she was bathing at high tide in the Pacific Ocean in October 1918. A man who was swimming nearby noticed Traverse did not come to the surface after struggling with strong waves. He pulled her by her skirt and took her to safety from the water off the coast of Ocean Park, California.

She became an avid duck hunter in southern California after settling there to make motion pictures.

Madlaine Traverse died in Cleveland in 1964.

== Early and personal life ==
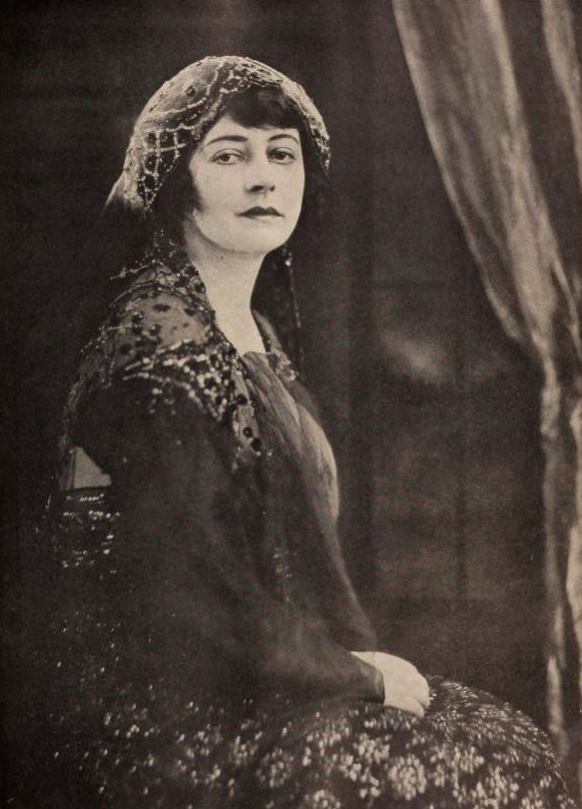
Madlaine Traverse in 1920

Madlaine Traverse's birth name was Mary Businsky. She was born August 1, 1875. Madlaine began her acting career on the stage in England. She married Max Traverse, who died in 1906. The lights from filming permanently damaged her eyes, forcing her into retirement. Mary Pickford, who starred with her in Poor Little Rich Girl, visited her in 1962, which was the highlight of her retirement years. She was 88 when she died January 7, 1964.

== Filmography ==
| Year | Title | Role | Notes |
|---|---|---|---|
| 1913 | The Other Woman | Lasca Duran | Short |
| 1913 | Leah Kleschna | Claire Berton | |
| 1914 | Three Weeks | Sonia - Queen of Veseria | |
| 1915 | The Closing Net | Leontine Petrovsky | |
| 1916 | Fruits of Desire | Kazia | |
| 1916 | The Shielding Shadow | Barbara | |
| 1917 | The Poor Little Rich Girl | Gwendolyn's Mother | Extant |
| 1917 | Sins of Ambition | Violet | Extant |
| 1918 | The Caillaux Case | Henriette Caillaux | |
| 1918 | The Danger Zone | Lola Dupre | |
| 1919 | Gambling in Souls | Marcia Dunning | |
| 1919 | The Love That Dares | Olive Risdon | |
| 1919 | When Fate Decides | Vera Loudon | |
| 1919 | Rose of the West | Rose Labelle | |
| 1919 | The Splendid Sin | Lady Marion Chatham | |
| 1919 | Snares of Paris | Marguerite Coullard | |
| 1919 | Lost Money | Judith Atherstone | |
| 1920 | What Would You Do? | Claudia Chilson | |
| 1920 | The Hell Ship | Paula Humphrey | |
| 1920 | The Tattlers | Bess Rutherford | |
| 1920 | The Iron Heart | Esther Regan | |
| 1920 | The Penalty | Woman | Uncredited |
| 1920 | The Spirit of Good | Nell Gordon | |
