= The Love That Dares =

1919 film by Harry F. Millarde

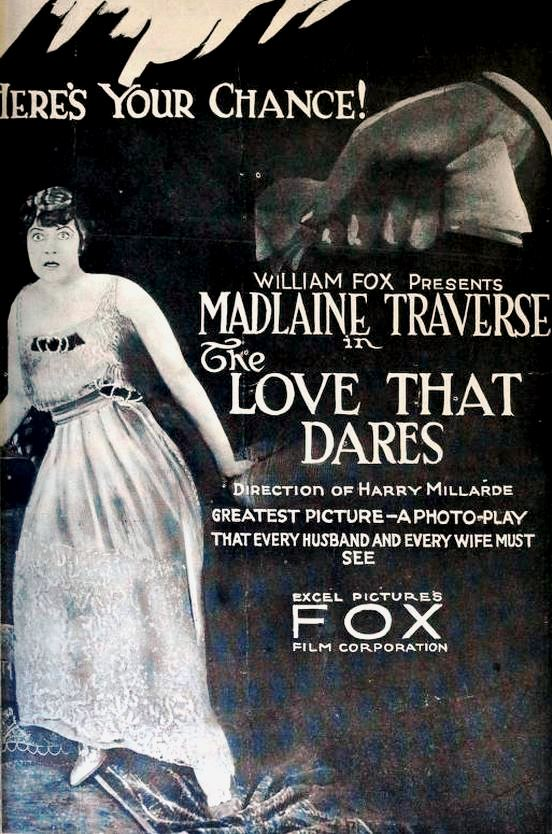
- Directed by: Harry Millarde
- Written by: Denison Clift
- Produced by: William Fox
- Starring: Madlaine Traverse
- Cinematography: Frank B. Good
- Distributed by: Fox Film Corporation
- Release date: April 20, 1919
- Running time: 60 minutes
- Country: USA
- Language: Silent.. English titles

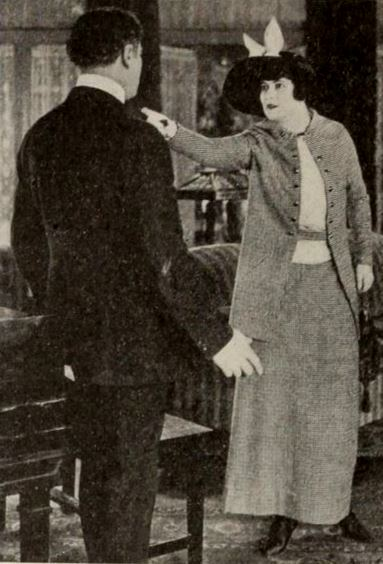
a scene from the film.

The Love That Dares is a lost 1919 silent film drama directed by Harry Millarde and starring Madlaine Traverse. It was produced and distributed by Fox Film Corporation.

== Plot ==
The plot according to Exhibitor's Trade Review, is Olive Risdon, wife of a prominent manufacturer, is still loved by a man who loved her before her marriage. The woman feels that her husband neglects her for his business and he is afraid to tell her ho is in financial difficulties because he can't bear to cause her worry. The other man uses the situation to further his own ends and offers to give the husband a large amount of money if he will divorce his wife. The husband strikes the man in the face. At a summer resort the husband learns that he must raise a large amount of money within twenty-four hours to save his fortune. The wife, desiring to help her husband, appeals to her former sweetheart and is told she can have the money for a certain price. In despair the wife promises to visit the man at his apartment at night. When she does she realizes that she cannot carry out the bargain but finds herself trapped. The villain's former mistress, torn by jealousy informs the husband. Misunderstandings are cleared away between husband and wife and the villain is shot by the mistress who then throws herself in the ocean.

== Cast ==
- Madlaine Traverse - Olive Risdon
- Thomas Santschi - Perry Risdon
- Frank Elliott - Ned Beckwith
- Mae Gaston - Marta Holmes
- Thomas Guise - Rutherford
- George B. Williams - Haynes

== Reception ==
Exhibitor's Trade Review writer Helen Rockwell gave the film a generally positive review. She expressed frustration with the Olive Risdon's decisions, saying "Every school-girl in the audience knows what it means, and yet the heroine possesses less intuition and common sense than most ordinary persons of feminine persuasion."

Motion Picture News reviewer Laurence Reid was also positive, praising Madlaine Traverse and Thomas Santschi in particular, saying "The two players mentioned above act with such authority, and with such a grasp upon the import of the subject that it seems like a page from life and not a leaf from a theatrical scrapbook."

== Censorship ==
The Kansas Board of Review initially rejected The Love That Dares in its entirety, but later re-evaluated. In order for the film to be exhibited in Kansas, several scenes and intertitles had to be removed. The parts eliminated were: five intertitles discussing a man seducing and deserting a girl, an intertitle between Olive and her former lover talking about his proposition, and the struggle between Olive and her former lover.

== See also ==
- 1937 Fox vault fire
