= The Cyclone (1920 film) =

1920 film

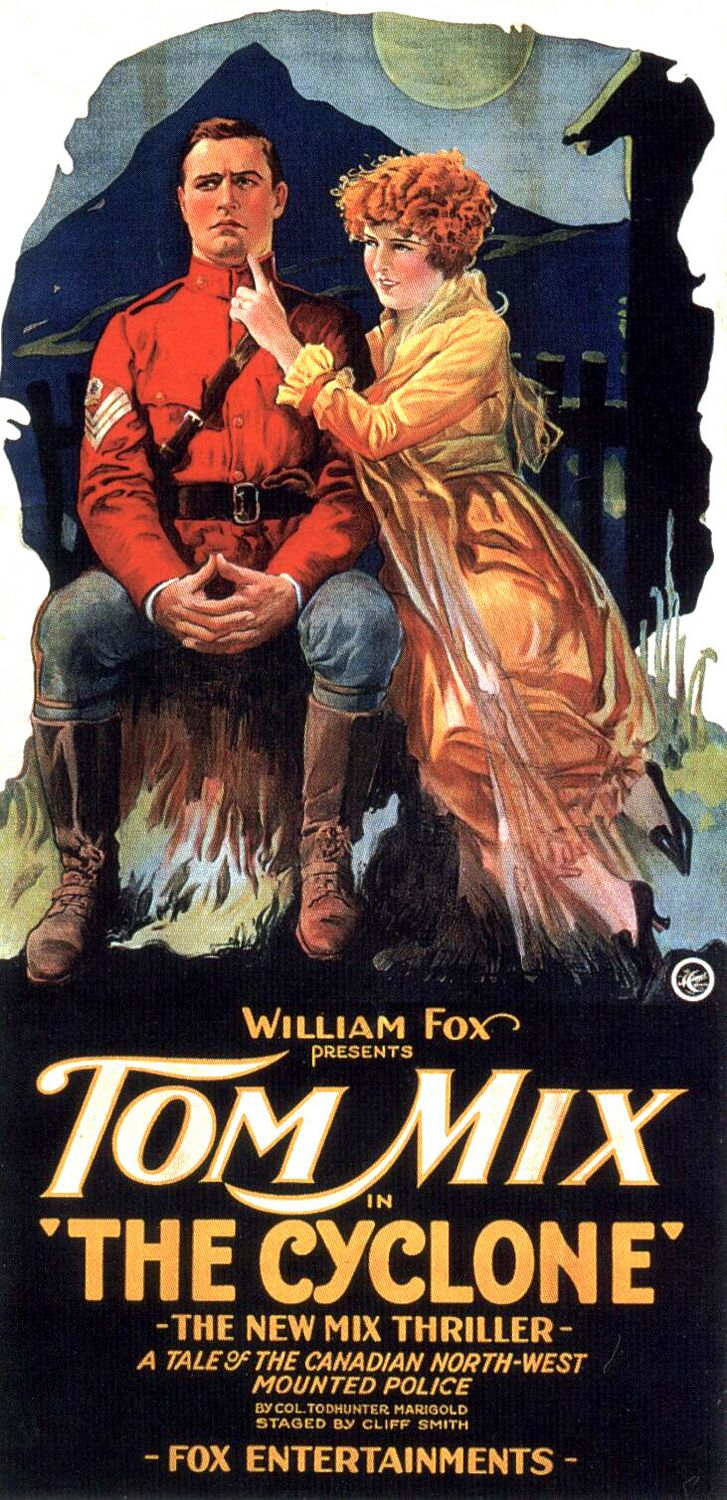
- Theatrical release poster
- Directed by: Clifford Smith
- Written by: Joseph Anthony Roach
- Story by: Todhunter Marigold
- Starring: Tom Mix; Colleen Moore; Henry Herbert; William Ellingford; Buck Jones
- Cinematography: Frank B. Good
- Production company: Fox Film Corporation
- Distributed by: Fox Film Corporation
- Release date: January 25, 1920
- Running time: 50 minutes
- Country: United States
- Language: Silent (English intertitles)

The Cyclone is a 1920 American silent action-adventure film directed by Clifford Smith and starring Tom Mix, Colleen Moore, Henry Herbert, William Ellingford, and Buck Jones. The film was released by Fox Film Corporation on January 25, 1920.

== Cast ==
- Tom Mix as Sergeant Tim Ryerson
- Colleen Moore as Sylvia Sturgis
- Henry Herbert as Ferdinand Baird
- William Ellingford as Silas Sturgis
- Buck Jones as Minor Role

== Preservation ==
With no listings in any film archives, The Cyclone is considered to be a lost film.
