= Rose of the West =

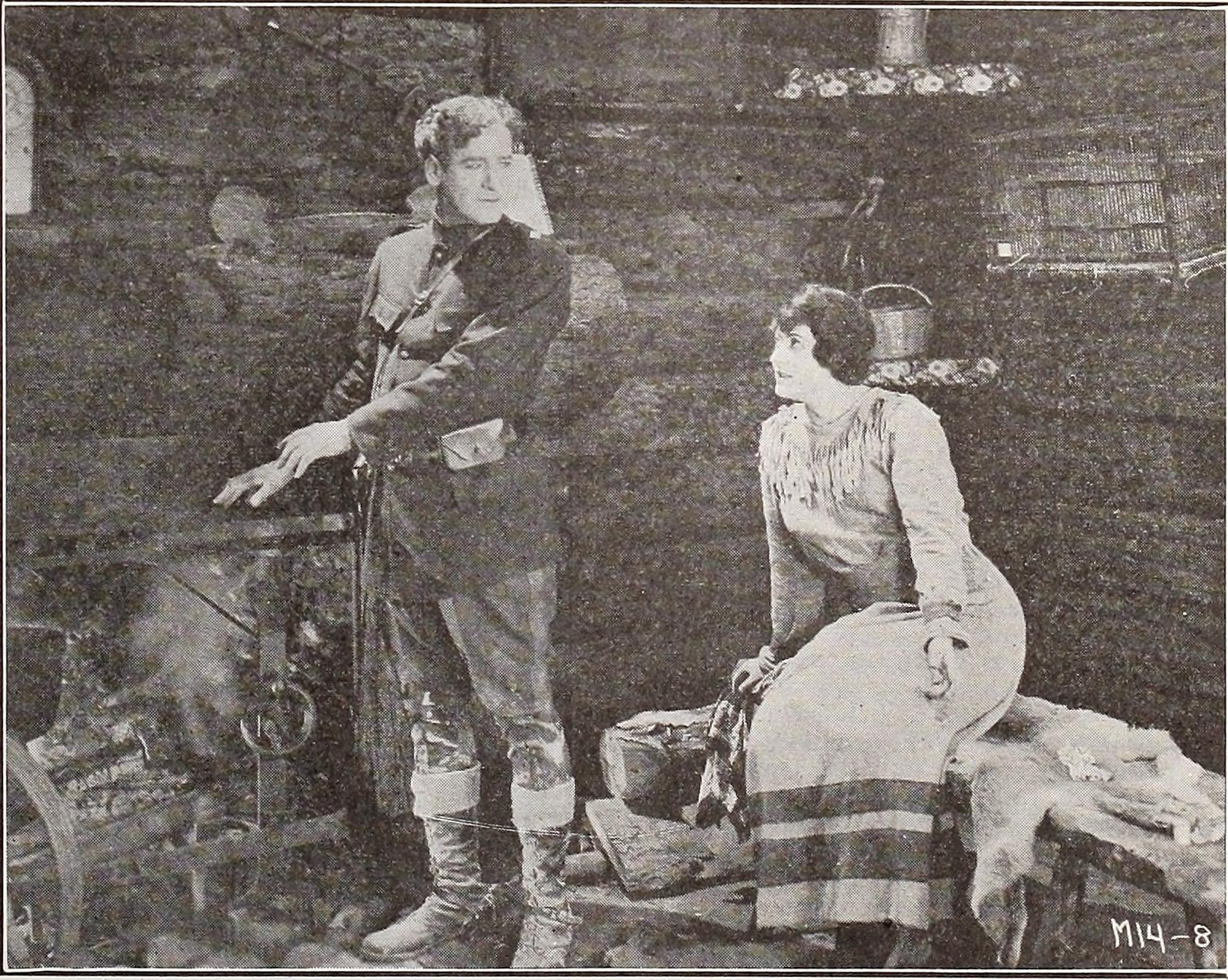
- Tom Santschi and Madlaine Traverse
- Directed by: Harry Millarde
- Written by: Denison Clift
- Starring: Madlaine Traverse; Frank Leigh; Thomas Santschi
- Cinematography: Frank B. Good
- Production company: Fox Film Corp.
- Distributed by: Fox Film Corp.
- Release date: July 20, 1919
- Running time: 5 reels
- Country: USA
- Language: Silent (English intertitles)

Rose of the West is a lost 1919 American silent drama film directed by Harry Millarde, and starring Madlaine Traverse from a screenplay and story by Denison Clift. The film also stars Frank Leigh, Tom Santschi, and Jack Nelson. It was produced and distributed by Fox Film Corp.

The plot revolves around a woman's long-thought dead husband returning to sell their daughter to a millionaire for gold.

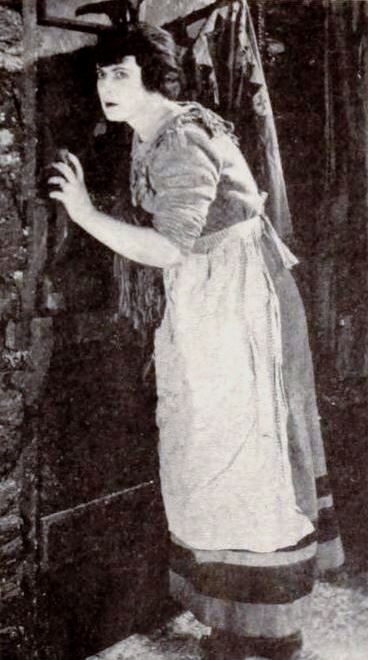
Madlaine Traverse

== Plot ==
Rose Labelle has been living in an isolated cabin with her daughter, Angela, her servant Natoosh, and her son Jules for two years after her cruel husband, Pierre, goes missing. Believing that he is dead, she becomes engaged to Lieut. Col. Bruce Knight of the Royal Canadian Mounted Police, but as they embrace, Pierre bursts into the cabin. He throws Knight from the home, and states that he wants to sell Angela to a nearby landowner for his land. The landowner, Beaudry, refuses to sell the gold-rich land for money, but would agree if Pierre sold him Angela. Beaudry and Pierre return to the cabin to steal Angela away, but are thwarted by Rose. They lure Angela to an abandoned cabin, where Rose and Jules follow them, and Rose shoots Beaudry dead. When she is charged with murder, Jules kills Pierre and is mortally wounded in return. With his dying breath, he takes the blame for the murder, leaving Rose to marry Knight and live happily.

== Cast ==
- Madlaine Traverse as Rose Labelle
- Frank Leigh as Pierre Labelle
- Beatrice La Plante as Angela
- Thomas Santschi as Lieut. Col. Bruce Knight
- Henry Hebert as Major Hilton
- Minnie Devereaux as Natoosh (credited as Minna Prevost)
- Jack Nelson as Jules

== Production ==
Production began under the working title "Until Eternity" in late May, and continued until mid-June, and was partially shot on location at Huntington Lake. During production of Rose of the West, Madlaine Traverse fell from her horse and sustained minor injuries; filming was paused for several days while she recovered.

== Reception ==
The Film Daily review was very positive, saying that while the story was "nothing startlingly fresh," the plot was a "Skillful construction has merged the two threads of the plot into a story possessing unity, directness and some sympathetic appeal."

Moving Picture World reviewer Robert C. McElravy was positive, stating that the film's cinematography was "particularly attractive" and "It has many strong moments and the continuity is unusually good."

The New York Clipper also gave the film a positive review, describing the film as "A story filled with suspense, presented with good photography and enacted by a very good cast."

== Preservation ==
With no prints located in archives, Rose of the West is considered a lost film.
