= The Mother Heart =

1921 silent film

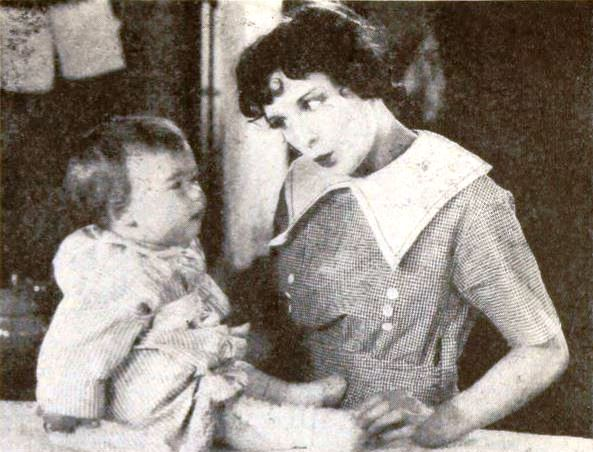
- Directed by: Howard M. Mitchell
- Written by: Frank Howard Clark; Howard M. Mitchell
- Produced by: William Fox
- Starring: Shirley Mason; Raymond McKee; Edwin B. Tilton
- Cinematography: Glen MacWilliams
- Production company: Fox Film
- Distributed by: Fox Film
- Release date: May 29, 1921
- Running time: 50 minutes
- Country: United States
- Languages: Silent; English intertitles

The Mother Heart is a 1921 American silent drama film directed by Howard M. Mitchell and starring Shirley Mason, Raymond McKee and Edwin B. Tilton.

== Cast ==
- Shirley Mason as May Howard
- Raymond McKee as Billy Bender
- Edwin B. Tilton as George Stuart
- Cecil Van Auker as John Howard
- William Buckley as Clifford Hamilton
- Peggy Elinor as Ella Howard
- Frances Hatton as Mrs. Howard
- Lillian Langdon as Mrs. Lincoln

== Bibliography ==
- Solomon, Aubrey. The Fox Film Corporation, 1915-1935: A History and Filmography. McFarland, 2011.
