= The Broadway Sport =

- Directed by: Carl Harbaugh
- Written by: Carl Harbaugh
- Starring: Stuart Holmes; Wanda Hawley; Dan Mason; Mabel Rutter; William B. Green
- Cinematography: Georges Benoît
- Production company: Fox Film Corporation
- Distributed by: Fox Film Corporation
- Release date: June 10, 1917
- Running time: 5 reels
- Country: United States
- Languages: Silent film (English intertitles)

The Broadway Sport is a 1917 American silent comedy film directed by Carl Harbaugh and starring Stuart Holmes, Wanda Hawley, Dan Mason, Mabel Rutter, and William B. Green. The film was released by Fox Film Corporation on June 10, 1917.

== Cast ==
- Stuart Holmes as Hezekiah Dill
- Wanda Hawley as Sadie Sweet (as Wanda Petit)
- Dan Mason as Hector Sweet
- Mabel Rutter as Violet Gaffney
- William B. Green as John D. Boulder (as W.B. Green)
- J. Sullivan as His Counselor
- Mario Majeroni as The Hypnotist
- Jay Wilson as Plain Clothesman

== Preservation ==
The film is now considered lost.

== See also ==
- List of lost films
- 1937 Fox vault fire
