= Bar Nothin' =

1921 film directed by Edward Sedgwick

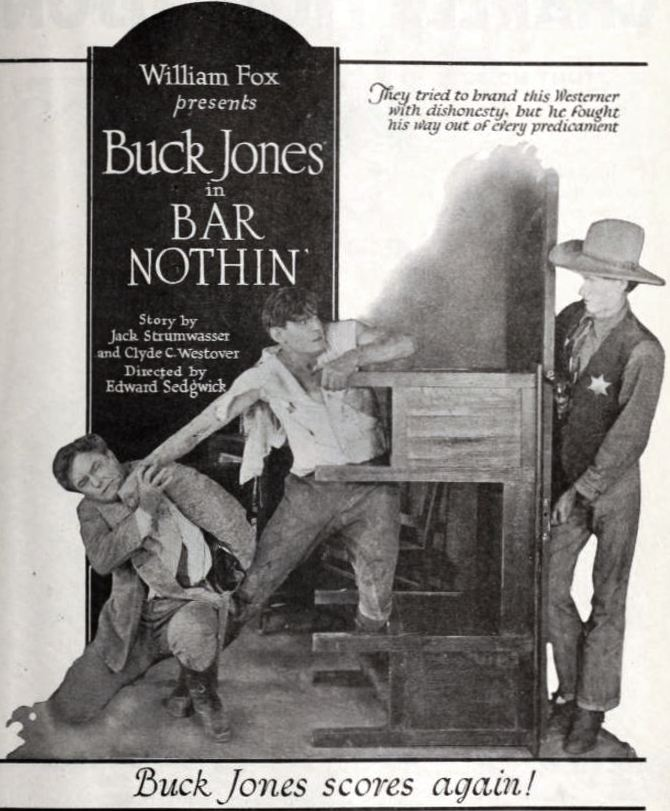
- Theatrical release poster
- Directed by: Edward Sedgwick
- Written by: John Stone; Clyde Westover
- Produced by: William Fox
- Starring: Buck Jones; Ruth Renick; Arthur Edmund Carewe
- Cinematography: Frank B. Good
- Production company: Fox Film Corporation
- Distributed by: Fox Film Corporation
- Release date: October 2, 1921
- Running time: 50 minutes
- Country: United States
- Languages: Silent; English intertitles

Bar Nothin' (sometimes written as Bar Nothing) is a 1921 American silent Western film directed by Edward Sedgwick and starring Buck Jones, Ruth Renick and Arthur Edmund Carewe.

== Cast ==
- Buck Jones as Duke Smith
- Ruth Renick as Bess Lynne
- Arthur Edmund Carewe as Stinson
- Jim Farley as Bill Harliss
- William Buckley as Harold Lynne

== Preservation ==
With no holdings located in archives, Bar Nothin' is considered a lost film.

== Bibliography ==
- Connelly, Robert B. The Silents: Silent Feature Films, 1910-36, Volume 40, Issue 2. December Press, 1998.
- Munden, Kenneth White. The American Film Institute Catalog of Motion Pictures Produced in the United States, Part 1. University of California Press, 1997.
- Solomon, Aubrey. The Fox Film Corporation, 1915-1935: A History and Filmography. McFarland, 2011.
