= The Lamplighter (film) =

1921 silent film

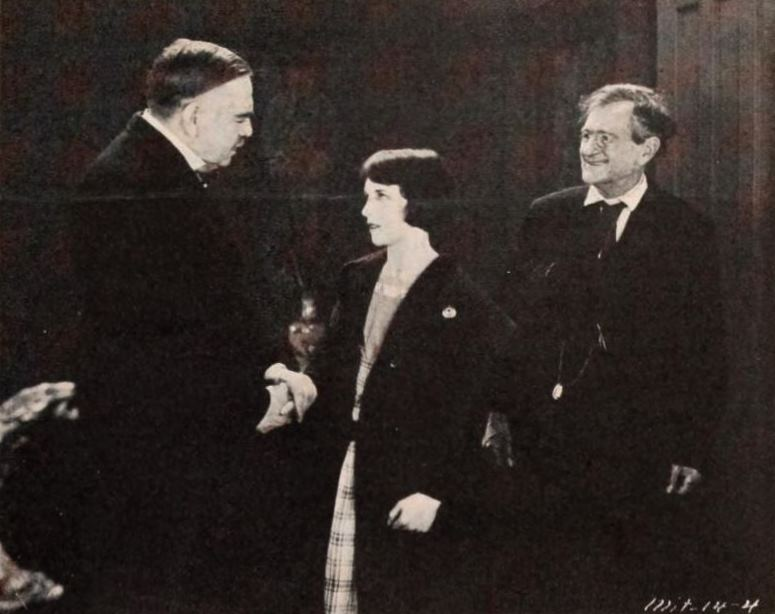
- Directed by: Howard M. Mitchell
- Written by: Robert A. Dillon
- Produced by: William Fox
- Starring: Shirley Mason; Raymond McKee; Philo McCullough
- Cinematography: Glen MacWilliams
- Production company: Fox Film
- Distributed by: Fox Film
- Release date: April 10, 1921
- Running time: 60 minutes
- Country: United States
- Languages: Silent; English intertitles

The Lamplighter is a 1921 American silent drama film directed by Howard M. Mitchell and starring Shirley Mason, Raymond McKee and Philo McCullough.

== Cast ==
- Shirley Mason as Gertie
- Raymond McKee as Willie Sullivan
- Ethelbert Knott as The Lamplighter
- Edwin B. Tilton as Malcolm Graham
- Iris Ashton as Emily Graham
- Philo McCullough as Philip Amory
- Madge Hunt as The Housekeeper

== Bibliography ==
- Robert B. Connelly. The Silents: Silent Feature Films, 1910-36, Volume 40, Issue 2. December Press, 1998.
