= Frank Leigh =

British film actor

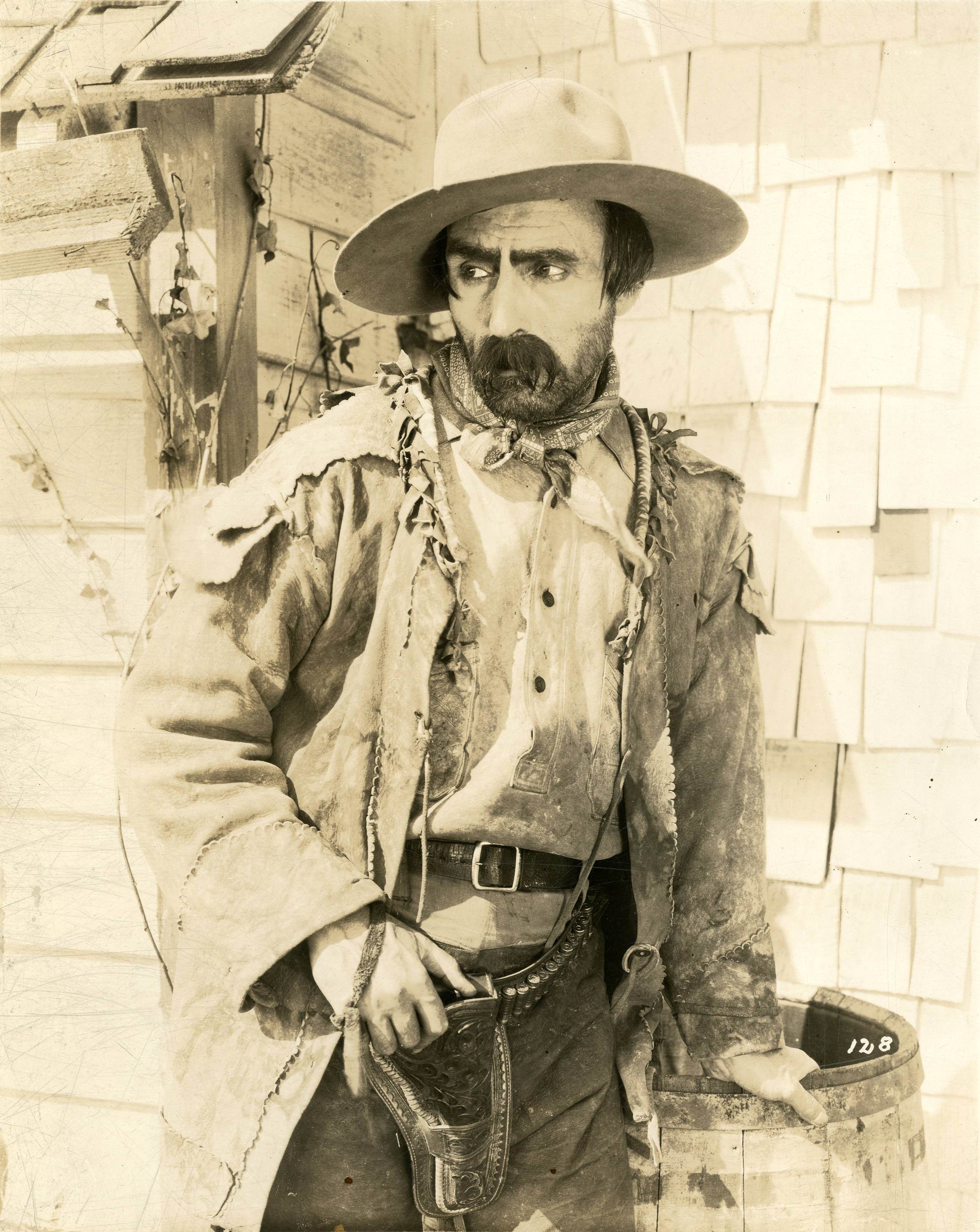
- Leigh in Bob Hampton of Placer (1921)
- Born: 18 April 1876; London, England, UK
- Died: 9 May 1948 (aged 72); Los Angeles, California, U.S.
- Occupation: Actor
- Years active: 1917–1947 (film)

Frank Leigh (18 April 1876 – 9 May 1948) was a British stage and film actor.

== Biography ==
Born Frank Leigh Valles in London in 1876, Leigh settled in Hollywood and became a leading man during the silent era. Following the introduction of sound, his roles were much less significant and all his roles after 1937 were uncredited. He died in Los Angeles in 1948 and according to his obituary in "Billboard", was buried under his birth name of Frank Leigh Valles at Forest Lawn Memorial Park in Los Angeles.

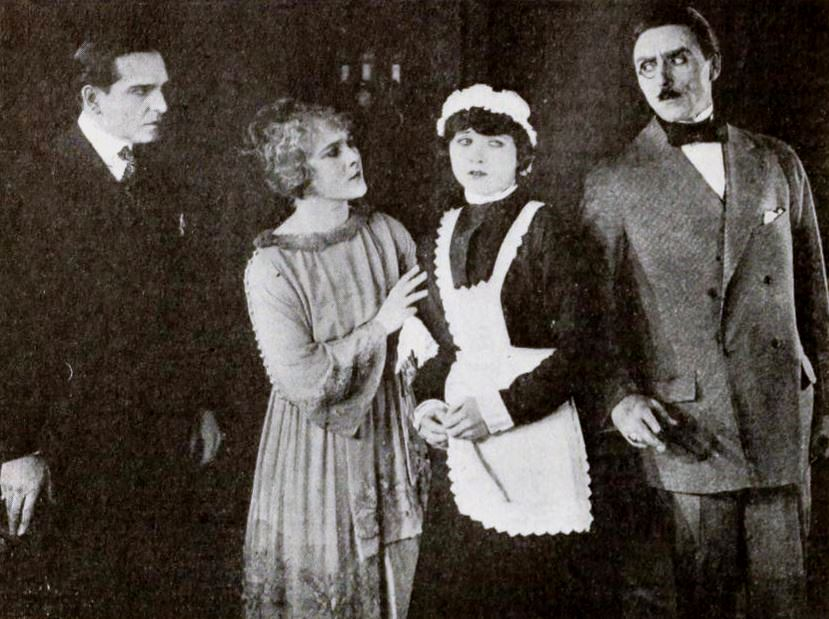
Still with Leigh (right) in The Usurper (1919)

== Selected filmography ==
- On Dangerous Ground (1917)
- Life's Whirlpool (1917)
- Stolen Orders (1918)
- Crown Jewels (1918)
- All of a Sudden Norma (1919)
- The Homebreaker (1919)
- Common Property (1919)
- Her Buckskin Knight (1919)
- Rose of the West (1919)
- Lord and Lady Algy (1919)
- A Regular Fellow (1919)
- Dangerous Days (1920)
- The Cup of Fury (1920)
- The Mother of His Children (1920)
- Nurse Marjorie (1920)
- Help Wanted - Male (1920)
- Pilgrims of the Night (1921)
- The Light in the Clearing (1921)
- Out of the Silent North (1922)
- Truxton King (1923)
- The Gentleman from America (1923)
- Ashes of Vengeance (1923)
- Rosita (1923)
- The Reckless Age (1924)
- The Breath of Scandal (1924)
- As Man Desires (1925)
- His Majesty, Bunker Bean (1925)
- The Winding Stair (1925)
- The Adorable Deceiver (1926)
- Flame of the Argentine (1926)
- Secret Orders (1926)
- The Impostor (1926)
- The Lady of the Harem (1926)
- The Flaming Forest (1926)
- The Tigress (1927)
- Somewhere in Sonora (1927)
- Mockery (1927)
- A Night of Mystery (1928)
- Love in the Desert (1929)
- Montmartre Rose (1929)
- The Thirteenth Chair (1929)
- Lotus Lady (1930)
- Ten Nights in a Barroom (1931)
- The Woman from Monte Carlo (1932)
- Kiss of Araby (1933)
- The Spanish Cape Mystery (1935)
- The Amazing Exploits of the Clutching Hand (1936)
- The Legion of Missing Men (1937)
- The Black Swan (1942)

== Bibliography ==
- Goble, Alan. The Complete Index to Literary Sources in Film. Walter de Gruyter, 1999.
