= Smiles Are Trumps =

1922 film

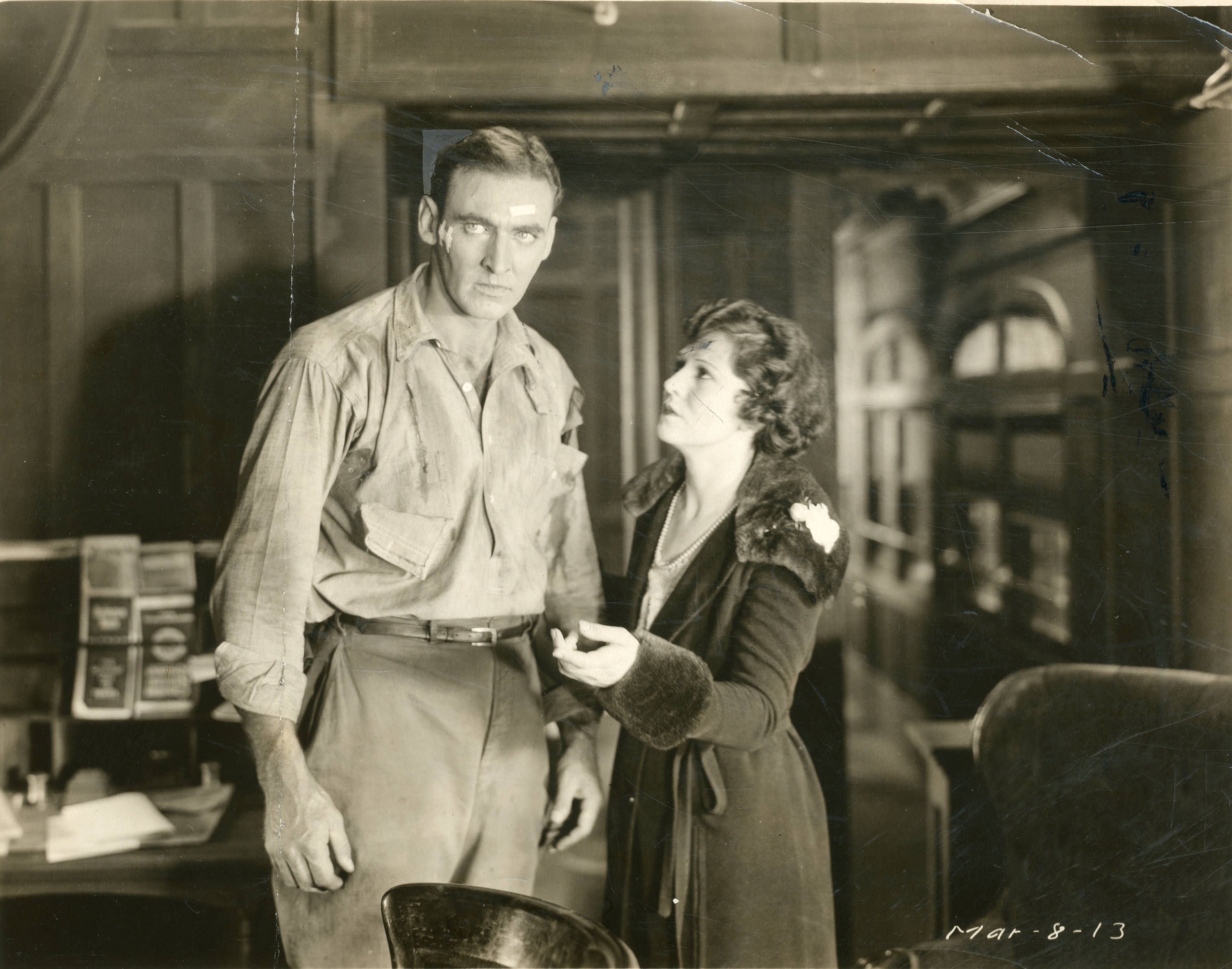
- Directed by: George Marshall
- Written by: Frank L. Packard (story); Delbert E. Davenport
- Produced by: William Fox
- Starring: Maurice 'Lefty' Flynn; Ora Carew; Herschel Mayall
- Cinematography: Frank B. Good
- Production company: Fox Film Corporation
- Distributed by: Fox Film Corporation
- Release date: February 5, 1922
- Running time: 50 minutes
- Country: United States
- Languages: Silent; English intertitles

Smiles Are Trumps is a 1922 American silent action film directed by George Marshall and starring Maurice 'Lefty' Flynn, Ora Carew and Herschel Mayall.

== Cast ==
- Maurice 'Lefty' Flynn as Jimmy Carson
- Ora Carew as Marjorie Manning
- Miles McCarthy as John Slevin
- Herschel Mayall as James Manning
- Kirke Lucas as Enrico
- C. Norman Hammond as Martino

== Bibliography ==
- Connelly, Robert B. The Silents: Silent Feature Films, 1910-36, Volume 40, Issue 2. December Press, 1998.
- Munden, Kenneth White. The American Film Institute Catalog of Motion Pictures Produced in the United States, Part 1. University of California Press, 1997.
- Solomon, Aubrey. The Fox Film Corporation, 1915-1935: A History and Filmography. McFarland, 2011.
