= Romance Ranch =

1924 film by Howard M. Mitchell

- Directed by: Howard M. Mitchell
- Written by: Jessie Maude Wybro; Dorothy Yost
- Produced by: William Fox
- Starring: John Gilbert; Virginia Brown Faire; John Miljan
- Cinematography: Bert Baldridge
- Production company: Fox Film
- Distributed by: Fox Film
- Release date: June 24, 1924
- Running time: 50 minutes
- Country: United States
- Languages: Silent; English intertitles

Romance Ranch is a 1924 American silent drama film directed by Howard M. Mitchell and starring John Gilbert, Virginia Brown Faire and John Miljan.

== Cast ==
- John Gilbert as Carlos Brent
- Virginia Brown Faire as Carmen Hendley
- John Miljan as Clifton Venable
- Bernard Siegel as Felipe Varillo
- Evelyn Selbie as Tessa

== Preservation ==
With no prints of Romance Ranch located in any film archives, it is considered a lost film.

== Bibliography ==
- Munden, Kenneth White. The American Film Institute Catalog of Motion Pictures Produced in the United States, Part 1. University of California Press, 1997.
