= The Little Wanderer =

1920 silent film

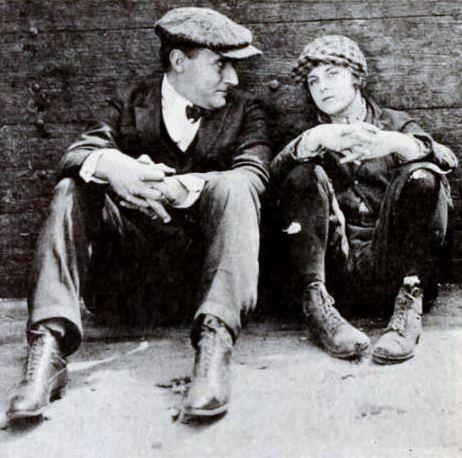
- Directed by: Howard M. Mitchell
- Written by: Denison Clift
- Produced by: William Fox
- Starring: Shirley Mason; Raymond McKee; Cecil Van Auker
- Cinematography: George Schneiderman
- Production company: Fox Film
- Distributed by: Fox Film
- Release date: August 15, 1920
- Running time: 50 minutes
- Country: United States
- Languages: Silent; English intertitles

The Little Wanderer is a 1920 American silent drama film directed by Howard M. Mitchell and starring Shirley Mason, Raymond McKee and Cecil Van Auker.

== Cast ==
- Shirley Mason as Jenny
- Raymond McKee as Larry Hard
- Cecil Van Auker as Joe Farley
- Alice Wilson as Kit
- Jack Pratt as Tully

== Bibliography ==
- Solomon, Aubrey. The Fox Film Corporation, 1915-1935: A History and Filmography. McFarland, 2011.
