= The Gilded Butterfly =

1926 film

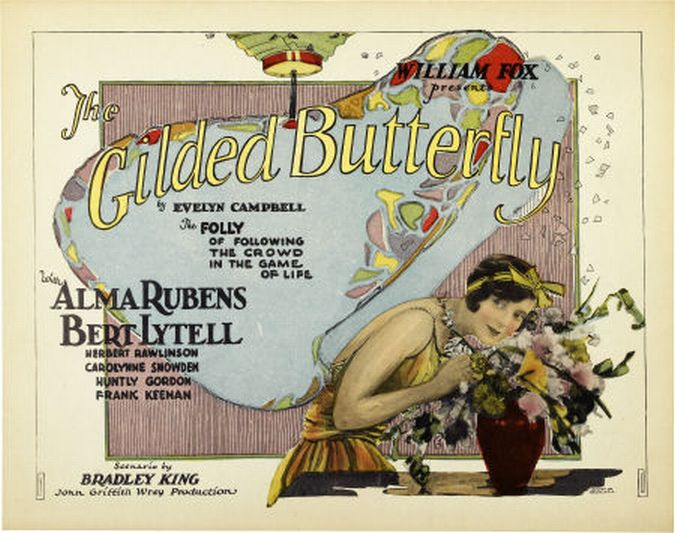
- Lobby card
- Directed by: John Griffith Wray
- Written by: Evelyn Campbell; Bradley King
- Produced by: William Fox
- Starring: Alma Rubens; Bert Lytell; Huntley Gordon
- Cinematography: Frank B. Good
- Production company: Fox Film Corp.
- Distributed by: Fox Film Corp.
- Release date: January 3, 1926
- Running time: 6 reels
- Country: United States
- Language: Silent (English intertitles)

The Gilded Butterfly is a lost 1926 American silent drama film directed by John Griffith Wray and starring Alma Rubens, Bert Lytell, and Huntley Gordon.

== Plot ==
As described in a film magazine review, Linda Haverhill is left penniless after the death of her father, who was esteemed but lived by his wits and was a sponger par excellence. She is advanced money by John Converse, who desires her despite her social butterfly tendencies. Attempting to maintain her place in society, she travels abroad but soon goes broke. On the way, Linda falls in love with Captain Brian Anestry of the United States Army, who arouses John's suspicions. In an attempt to obtain the insurance money, Linda burns her gowns and is arrested. Enroute to prison and while accompanied by a detective, their taxi is wrecked when it collides with a patrol wagon. The detective, fatally injured, identifies a different dead woman as his prisoner, allowing Linda to escape. John turns out not to be so villainous after all and relents, allowing Brian and Linda to be united.

== Cast ==
- Alma Rubens as Linda Haverhill
- Bert Lytell as Brian Anestry
- Huntley Gordon as John Converse
- Frank Keenan as Jim Haverhill
- Herbert Rawlinson as Courtney Roth
- Vera Lewis as Mrs. Ralston
- Arthur Hoyt as Mr. Ralston
- Carolynne Snowden as Maid

== Censorship ==
Before the film could be exhibited in Kansas, the Kansas Board of Review required the removal of a scene in reel 5 where two black servants are kissing in the back of a taxi cab, and the following intertitle; "Kisses like a vacuum cleaner."

== Preservation ==
With no prints of The Gilded Butterfly located in any film archives, it is a lost film.

== Bibliography ==
- Solomon, Aubrey. The Fox Film Corporation, 1915-1935: A History and Filmography. McFarland, 2011.
