= Denison Clift =

American film director, writer (1885–1961)

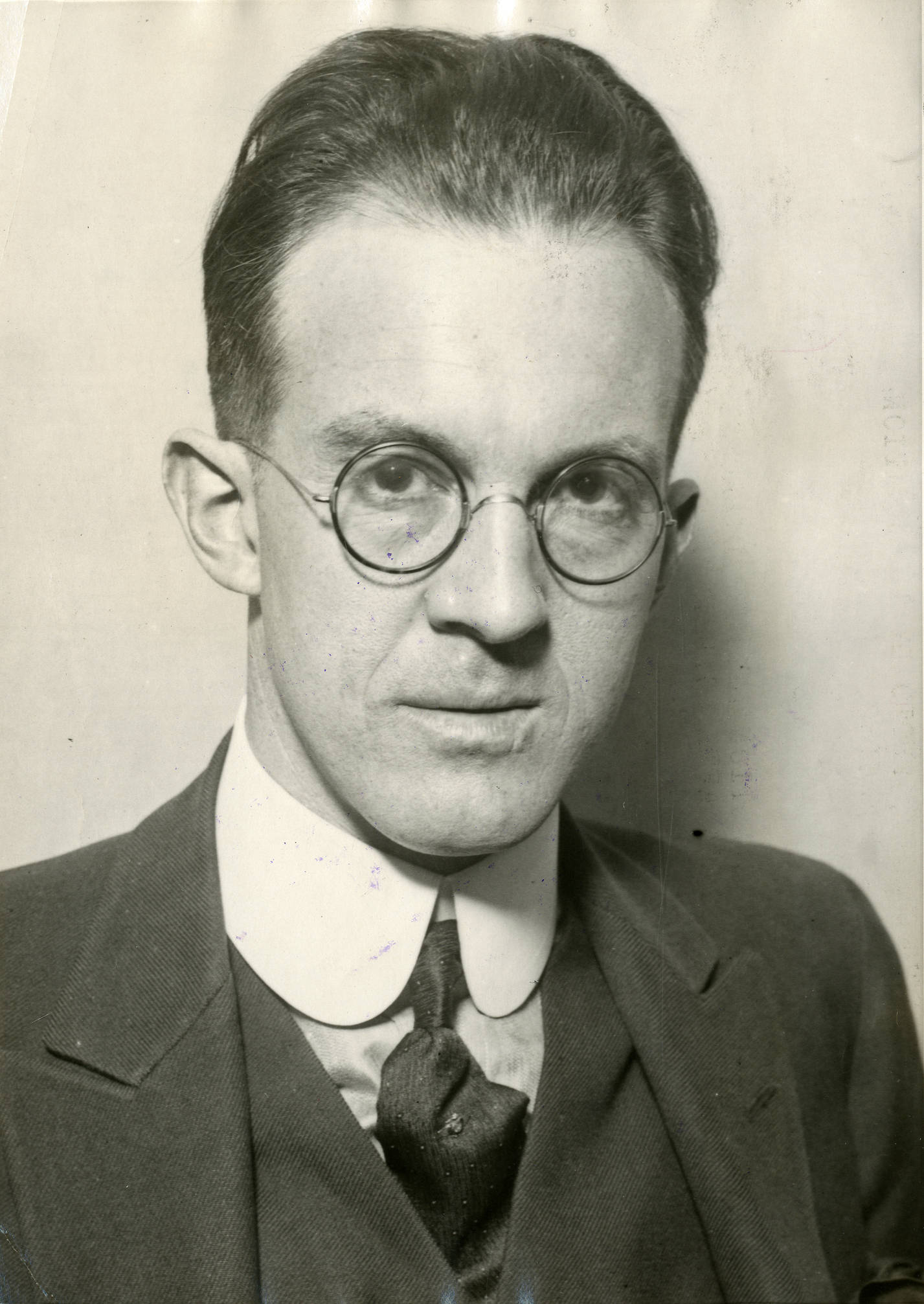
- Clift in 1924
- Born: May 2, 1885; San Francisco, California, U.S.
- Died: December 17, 1961 (aged 76); Hollywood, California, U.S.
- Occupation(s): Director, screenwriter, novelist

Denison Clift (1885–1961) was an American playwright, novelist, screenwriter and film director. He directed in both America and Great Britain, mainly during the Silent Era.

== Biography ==
Clift was educated at Stanford University. He began his career as a short story writer, novelist, and playwright. After he started writing, Cecil B. DeMille entrusted him with writing Lasky scenarios. Clift entered the film industry in 1918, penning the screenplay for William S. Hart's Wolves of the Rail. He began a contract writer with Fox, and was promoted director in 1920. Less than a year later, Clift was imported by a British firm in a larger movement to liven their domestic silent films by employing Hollywood directors. He directed a number of British films during the silent era, such as Demos (1921) featuring fellow American expatriate Evelyn Brent and The Love of Mary, Queen of Scots (1923), with Fay Compton in the title role. Clift remained in Great Britain after the transition to sound films, occasionally directing small-budget melodramas- including The Mystery of the Mary Celeste, which he also wrote- but was predominantly a freelance screenwriter.

His 1929 play Scotland Yard was adapted into films twice.

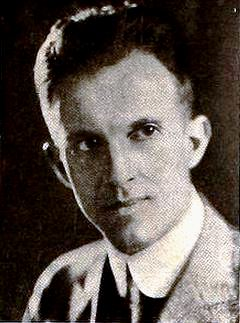
Photograph of Clift from the June 19, 1920 publication of Motion Picture News

== Selected filmography ==
=== Director ===
- The Iron Heart (1920)
- A Woman of No Importance (1921)
- The Diamond Necklace (1921)
- Demos (1921)
- Sonia (1921)
- A Bill of Divorcement (1922)
- This Freedom (1923)
- Ports of Call (1925)
- Paradise (1928)
- Taxi for Two (1929)
- High Seas (1929)
- City of Play (1929)
- The Mystery of the Mary Celeste (1935)

=== Screenwriter ===
- Gambling in Souls (1919)
- Rose of the West (1919)
- The Coming of the Law (1919)
- The Hell Ship (1920)
- The Little Wanderer (1920)
- Power Over Men (1929)
- All That Glitters (1936)
- Secrets of Scotland Yard (1944)
