= The Abysmal Brute =

1913 novel by Jack London

- First edition cover
- Author: Jack London
- Original title: The Abysmal Brute
- Language: English
- Genre: Adventure novel
- Publisher: The Century Company
- Publication date: 1913
- Publication place: United States
- Media type: Print
- OCLC: 288558

The Abysmal Brute is a novel by American writer Jack London, published in book form in 1913. It is a short novel, and could be regarded as a novelette. It first appeared in September 1911 in Popular Magazine.

In the story, a man who was brought up in a log cabin, and who is a newcomer to society, finds success as a boxer and recognizes corrupt practices in professional boxing.

== Background ==
In 1910, when the story was written, London had become a famous writer, but he was worried that he had exhausted his ideas. The Abysmal Brute was based on one of several plot outlines he bought from Sinclair Lewis, an admirer of London who was at the beginning of his career.

Other stories by Jack London about boxing are his novel The Game, published in 1905, his short story "A Piece of Steak" of 1909, and his short story "The Mexican" of 1911.

== Summary ==
Sam Stubener, a boxing manager in San Francisco, travels to a remote log cabin in northern California on getting a letter from retired boxer Pat Glendon, who lives there with his son, Pat Glendon Jr, a promising young boxer. Pat Jr fights well; otherwise, he knows little of city life; he hunts and fishes in the forest, he reads poetry and avoids women.

Sam brings Pat Jr back to San Francisco. Although Sam and Pat both know he could win a fight with a top boxer, the conventions of boxing require that Pat has to start with a boxer of lower rank. In his first three fights, he knocks out his opponent immediately with one punch. Sam tells Pat to make his fights last longer, to attract public; since Pat says that he is master of his opponent "at any inch or second of the fight", they agree in advance on which round the knockout will happen.

Pat's career takes off, winning fights worldwide. The newspapers, who interpret his detachment from the real world as unsociability, call him "The Abysmal Brute." Sam protects him from the corruption in boxing. Pat is not aware that Sam is using his knowledge of the timing of the knockout in a betting syndicate.

Pat is interviewed by Maud Sangster, a journalist from a family of millionaires, at the Cliff House, San Francisco. They immediately fall in love. Maud tells him she has heard in which round he will knock out his opponent in his next fight, and Pat wonders how his agreement with Sam became known. He orders Sam out of the room, then he tells her the knockout will be in a later round; this is to be a secret. When his opponent is knocked out in the round originally agreed with Sam, Maud is angry with Pat. He tells her his opponent faked the knockout; he is beginning to realize the corruption in the game, and says he is quitting boxing, although Sam has arranged a fight against top boxer Tom Cannam.

Pat and Maud get married; their honeymoon is spent in the forest and mountains. He decides to return for the fight with Cannam and pretends (to Sam) that he has sunk to the level of corruption around him. The event, promoted as an important occasion, starts with speeches from boxing legends to which, unexpectedly, he adds his own, describing the corruption in boxing, the fixings, and the planned next match against the world champion, which is already pre-set. This has a sensational effect; he then knocks out Cannam in the first round, knocks out the angry world champion also, and the event ends in uproar and severe beatings of all other boxers.

== Film adaptations ==
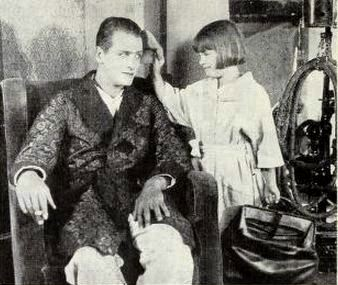
The actor Reginald Denny has makeup applied by his daughter, on the set of The Abysmal Brute

The Abysmal Brute, based on the novel, was made in 1923; it featured Reginald Denny as Pat Glendon Jr, Mabel Julienne Scott as Maud Sangster and Hayden Stevenson as Sam Stubener.

Conflict, is a 1936 film based on the novel and starring John Wayne as Pat Glendon Jr, Jean Rogers as Maud Sangster and Frank Sheridan as Sam Stubener.
