= Behold My Wife =

Behold My Wife may refer to:

- Behold My Wife! (1920 film), American silent film based on Gilbert Parker's novel The Translation of a Savage; directed by George Melford
- Behold My Wife! (1934 film), American film treatment of Parker's novel; directed by Mitchell Leisen
