= The Jucklins =

1896 novel by Opie Read

- Title page for The Jucklins (1896)
- Author: Opie Read
- Language: English
- Publisher: Laird & Lee (Chicago)
- Publication date: January 28, 1896
- Media type: Print (paperback)
- Pages: 291

For the 1921 film adaptation see The Jucklins (film)

The Jucklins is an 1896 novel by Opie Read. It was a bestselling book in the United States (Read asserted that over one million copies were sold), though it never appeared on the best-sellers list in The Bookman since its early and primary sales were of cheap paperback copies sold on trains and at newsstands.

The story is set in the backwoods of North Carolina. Teacher Bill Hawes lives with the Jucklins, a local farming family, including father Lim Jucklin, daughter Guinea, and son Alf.

Read reported that he sold the book for $700 to publisher Laird & Lee. He needed the cash to pay off a poker debt. A sequel of sorts, Old Lim Jucklin was released in 1905, and consists of a "collection of random observations and humors in the cracker-box philosopher manner."

== Adaptations ==
The novel was also adapted for the stage, and a version adapted by Daniel Hart debuted in Louisville, Kentucky in January 1897, produced by actor Stuart Robson. This version did not get rave reviews, and a wholly rewritten play by playwright Augustus Thomas (also produced by Robson) appeared in December of the same year.

A silent film version of the novel directed by George Melford, and starring Winter Hall, Mabel Julienne Scott, and Monte Blue was released in 1921.
