= Opie Read =

American journalist and humorist (1852–1939)

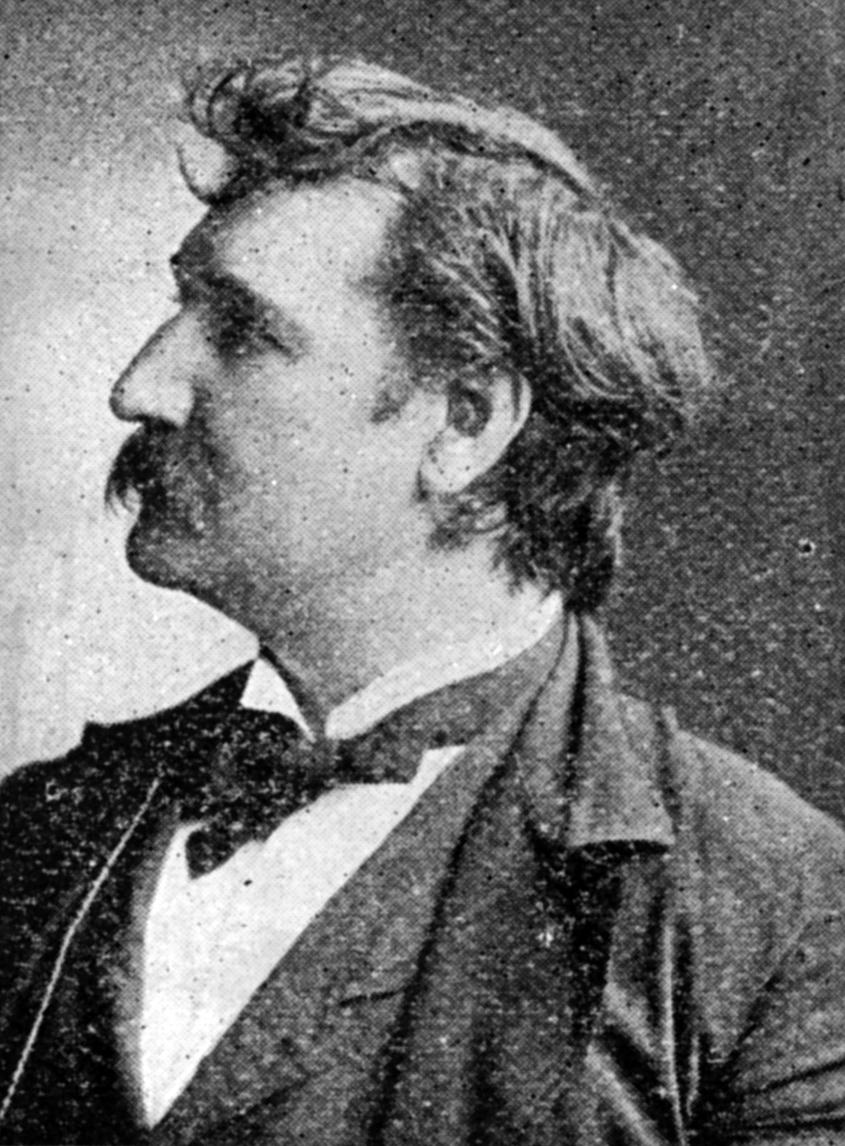
Opie Read from Who-When-What Book, 1900

Opie Percival Read (born December 22, 1852, Nashville Tennessee; d. November 2, 1939, Chicago Illinois) was an American journalist and humorist. His bibliography lists 60 published books.

== As a journalist ==
Prior to 1887, Opie Read edited five separate newspapers, all in the U.S. South: the Statesville Argus, the Bowling Green Pantograph, and the Louisville Courier-Journal, all in Kentucky, as well as the Evening Post, and Gazette in Little Rock, Arkansas. The Gazette was a predecessor of the Arkansas Democrat-Gazette. In 1882, Read founded his own humor magazine, the Arkansas Traveler, which he carried on after leaving newspaper journalism in 1887.

== As a novelist ==
Read brought the Arkansas Traveler, a flowing pen, and a command of Southern dialect to Chicago in 1887. He spent the remainder of his life in the ”Windy City” (Chicago).

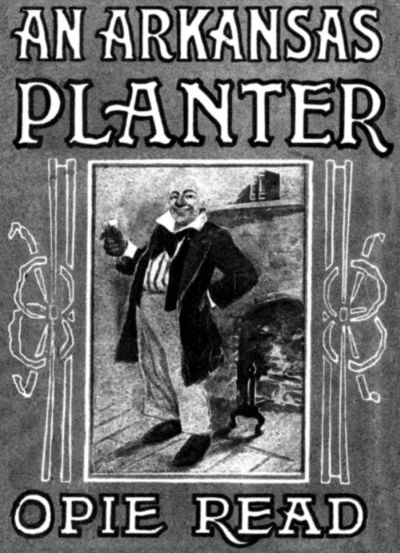
Frontispiece of An Arkansas Planter by Opie Read

Read's bibliography shows that in his first 20 full years in Chicago (1888–1908) he published 54 separate books, of which 31 were novels, 18 were book-length compilations of short fiction such as that published in the Arkansas Traveler, and five were works of non-fiction.

As a novelist, Read is credited with bringing the phrase "There's a sucker born every minute" into print in his 1898 novel A Yankee from the West, although the phrase seems to have been in verbal use before this and is often credited to P.T. Barnum.

After 1908, Read appears to have gone into semi-retirement. His authorial productivity noticeably slackened during the thirty remaining years of his life, although he did publish six additional books (two of them juveniles).

== His reputation ==
Read's works included A Kentucky Colonel (Laird & Lee, 1890), The Jucklins (1896), and Opie Read in the Ozarks: Including Many of the Rich, Rare, Quaint, Eccentric, Ignorant and Superstitious Sayings of the Natives of Missouri and Arkansaw (1905).

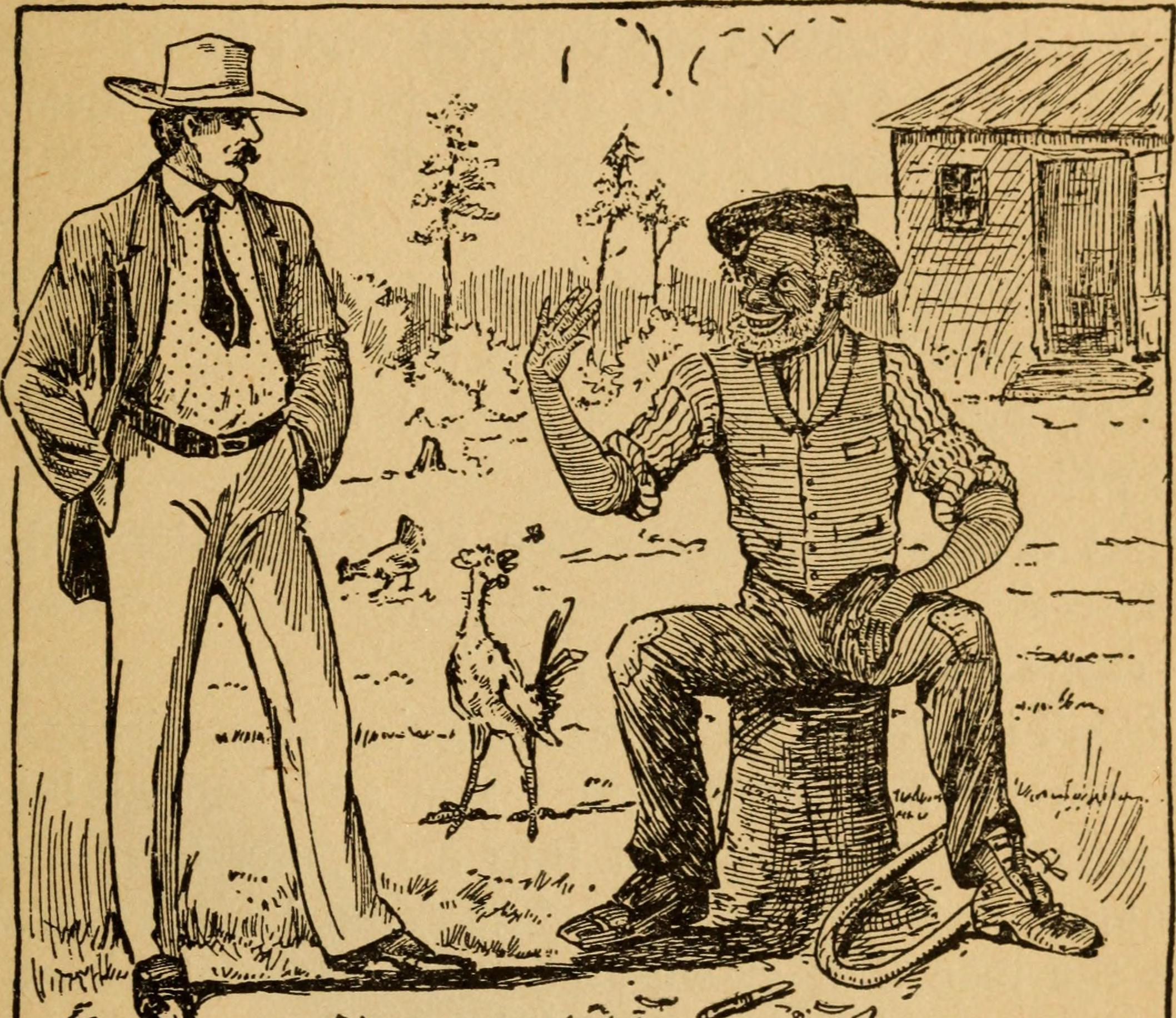
Illustration for Opie Read in the Ozarks

Read's standing was affected by the fact that many of his works, such as The Jucklins, were published as dime novels. Many later critics have dismissed Read as a presenter of lower-class white Southern stereotypes for middle-class Northerners.

The definitive biography of Read, written by his friend Maurice Elfer, is Opie Read: Novelist, Journalist and Lecturer (Detroit, Boyton Miller Press, 1940).

== Works ==
- Up Terrapin River (1888)
- Len Gamsett (1888) F.J. Schulte, Chicago
- A Kentucky Colonel (1890)
- Emmett Bonlore (1891)
- Toothpick Tales (1892)
- The Colossus (1893)
- Tennessee Judge (1893)
- The Wives of the Prophet (1894)
- On the Suwanee River (1895)
- The Jucklins (1896)
- My Young Master (1896)
- An Arkansas Planter (1896)
- The Tear in the Cup and Other Stories (1896) Laird & Lee
- Bolanyo (1897)
- Odd Folks (1897)
- Old Ebenezer (1897)
- A Yankee from the West (1898) adapted to film in 1915.
- The Waters of Caney Fork (1898)
- Judge Elbridge (1899)
- The Carpetbagger (1899) with Frank S. Pixley, it was adapted to the stage in 1900
- In the Alamo (1900)
- The Starbucks (1902)
- The Harkriders (1903)
- The American Cavalier (1904)
- Turk (1904) Laird & Lee, later republished as "Turkey Egg" Griffin
- Opie Read in the Ozarks; Including Many of the Rich, Rare, Quaint, Eccentric, Ignorant and Superstitious Sayings of the Natives of Missouri and Arkansaw (1905)
- The Son of the Swordmaker (1905)
- Old Lim Jucklin: The Opinions Of An Open-Air Philosopher (1905)
- An American in New York: A Novel of To-day (1905) Thompson & Thomas
- The Mystery of Margaret (1907)
- Confessions of a Negro Preacher (1928), published anonymously it is sometimes credited to Read

== Filmography ==
- The Starbucks (1912)

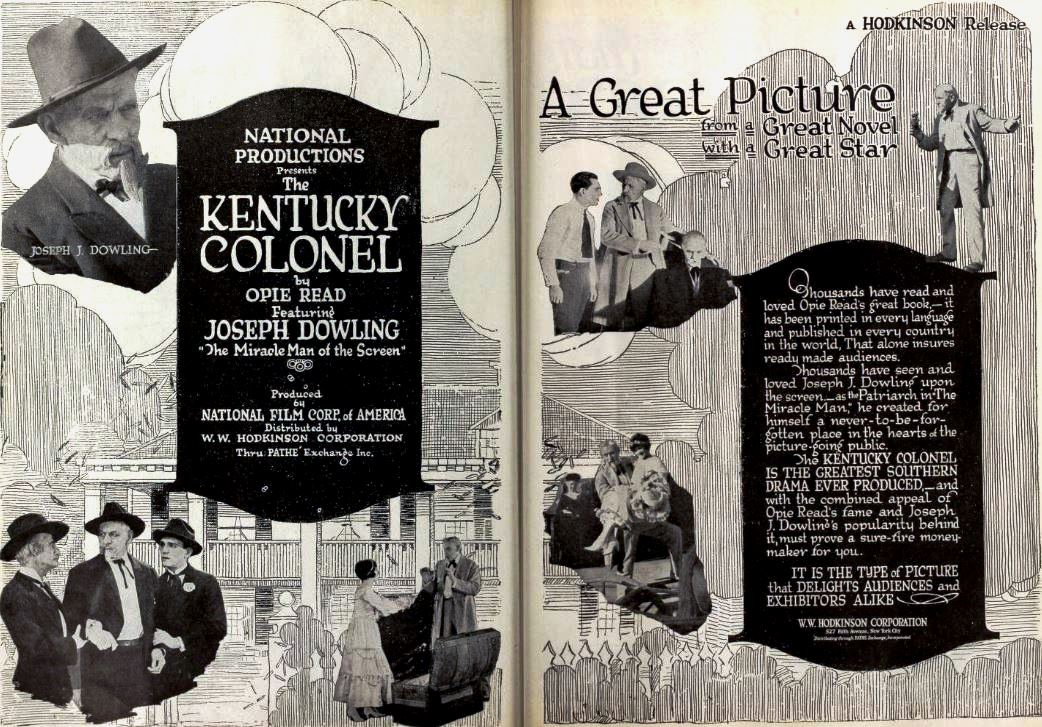

- A Yankee from the West (1915)
- Almost a Husband (1919)
- The Kentucky Colonel (1920)
- The Jucklins (1920), produced and directed by George Medford with Mabel Julienne Scott, Monte Blue, Ruth Renock, Charles Ogle, and Fanny Midgel.
- The Wives of the Prophet (1926)
