= The Game (London novel) =

Novel by Jack London

- First edition cover
- Author: Jack London
- Language: English
- Genre: Sporting/Boxing novel
- Publisher: Macmillan
- Publication date: June 1905
- Publication place: United States
- Media type: Print (Hardback & Paperback)
- Pages: 182
- OCLC: 49293889

The Game is a 1905 novel by Jack London about a twenty-year-old boxer, Joe, who meets his death in the ring. London was a sports reporter for the Oakland Herald and based the novel on his personal observations.

== Overview ==
Joe Fleming earns his livelihood as a sailmaker and supports his mother and sisters. He adds to his income by taking part in prize-fights at sporting clubs, and talks enthusiastically about what he feels in the ring. He is due to be married to Genevieve, who works in the Silversteins' candy shop. Joe agrees to give up "the Game" but asks that Genevieve watch his last fight, on the eve of their wedding, and she reluctantly agrees. The story is told from Genevieve's point of view.

== Background ==
This is one of at least four stories London wrote about boxing, the others being "A Piece of Steak" (1909), "The Mexican" (1911), and The Abysmal Brute (1911). This writing, and especially The Game, helped to make boxing a respectable literary topic.

When London was accused of inaccuracy in The Game he answered his critic with "I have had these experiences and it was out of these experiences, plus a fairly intimate knowledge of prize-fighting in general, that I wrote The Game."

The book is alleged to have persuaded Gene Tunney to retire from boxing after he read the book in the late 1920s.
