= Long Live the King (1923 film) =

1923 film by Victor Schertzinger

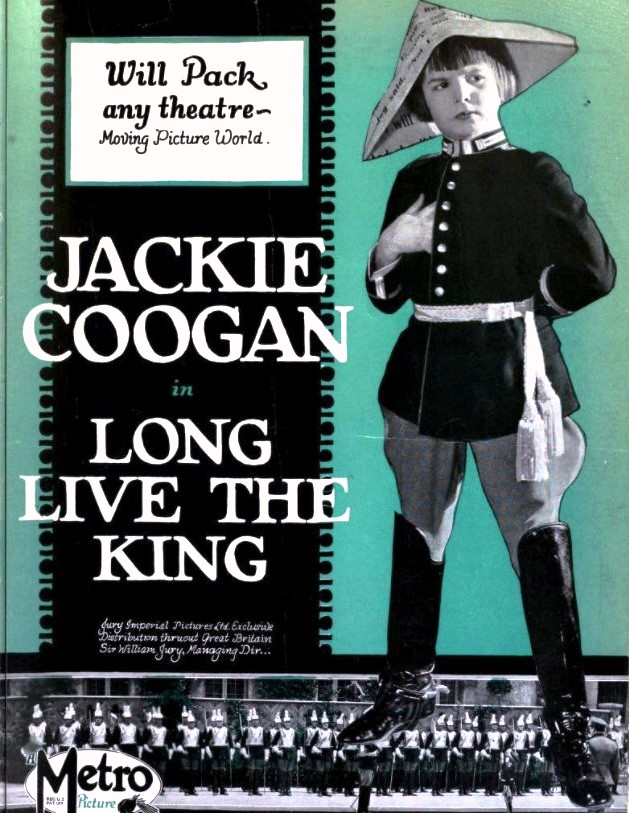
- Directed by: Victor Schertzinger
- Written by: C. Gardner Sullivan; Eve Unsell
- Based on: Long Live the King by Mary Roberts Rinehart
- Starring: Jackie Coogan; Rosemary Theby
- Cinematography: Frank B. Good
- Production company: Metro Pictures
- Distributed by: Metro Pictures
- Release date: November 26, 1923
- Running time: 1 hour, 44 minutes
- Country: United States
- Language: Silent (English intertitles)

Long Live the King is a 1923 American silent drama film directed by Victor Schertzinger and starring Jackie Coogan. The film is based on the 1917 novel of the same name by Mary Roberts Rinehart. It was produced and released by Metro Pictures and was Coogan's first film for Metro Pictures.

== Cast ==
- Jackie Coogan as Crown Prince Otto
- Rosemary Theby as Countess Olga
- Ruth Renick as Princess Hedwig
- Vera Lewis as Archduchess Annuncita
- Alan Hale as King Karl
- Allan Forrest as Nikky
- Walt Whitman as The Chancellor
- Robert Brower as The King
- Raymond Lee as Bobby, The American Boy
- Monte Collins as Adelbert
- Sam Appel as Black Humbert
- Allan Sears as Bobby's Father
- Ruth Handforth as Mrs. Braithwaite, The Governess
- Larry Fisher as Herman Spier
- Eddie Boland as Chief Guard
- Loretta McDermott as Countess Olga's Maid
- Henry A. Barrows as The Bishop

== Survival status ==
A print of Long Live the King survives in Gosfilmofond.
