= The Witching Hour (1921 film) =

1921 film

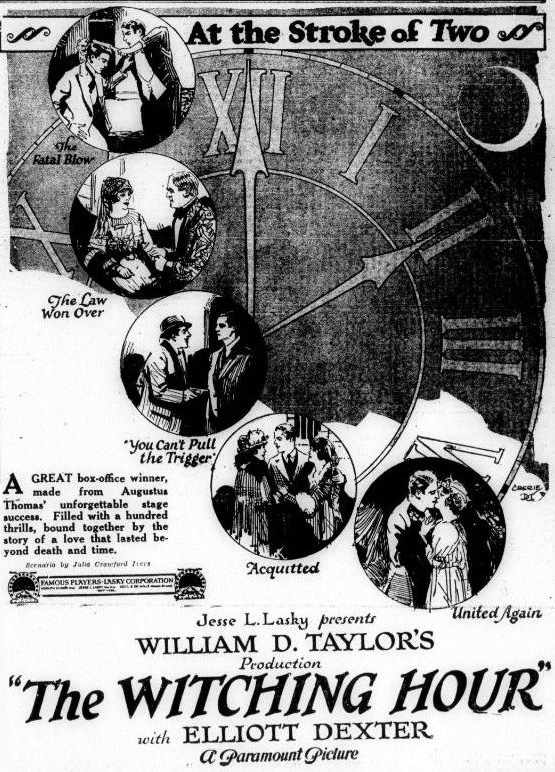
- Advertisement
- Directed by: William Desmond Taylor
- Screenplay by: Julia Crawford Ivers(screenplay); Augustus E. Thomas(stage play)
- Produced by: Jesse L. Lasky
- Starring: Elliott Dexter; Winter Hall; Ruth Renick; Robert Cain; A. Edward Sutherland; Mary Alden; F. A. Turner
- Cinematography: James Van Trees
- Production company: Famous Players–Lasky Corporation
- Distributed by: Paramount Pictures
- Release date: April 10, 1921
- Running time: 82 minutes
- Country: United States
- Language: Silent (English intertitles)

The Witching Hour is a 1921 American silent drama film directed by William Desmond Taylor and written by Julia Crawford Ivers, adapting the 1907 stage play by Augustus E. Thomas. The film stars Elliott Dexter, Winter Hall, Ruth Renick, Robert Cain, A. Edward Sutherland, Mary Alden, and F. A. Turner. The film was released on April 10, 1921, by Paramount Pictures.

This was one of three times that the 1907 stage play was adapted to film (including once in 1916), and according to critic Christopher Workman, was "the least interesting of the three film adaptations". A print of this film currently exists in the Library of Congress.

British-born actor A. Edward Sutherland starred in a number of silent films before moving to the United States where he became a director, working on such Hollywood films as Murders in the Zoo (1932), Beyond Tomorrow (1940) and The Invisible Woman (1940).

== Plot ==
Clay Whipple is convicted of murdering the governor following an incident involving a cat's eye pin. Whipple is sentenced to death, but a mentalist named Psychic Jack believes he is innocent since Whipple had been hypnotized at the time of the murder. The psychic persuades the judge to grant the condemned man a retrial, and he sets out to uncover the identity of the real killer, during which time he manages to prevent a second murder from occurring.

== Cast ==
- Elliott Dexter as Psychic Jack Brookfield
- Winter Hall as Judge Prentice
- Ruth Renick as Viola Campbell
- Robert Cain as Frank Hardmuth
- A. Edward Sutherland as Clay Whipple
- Mary Alden as Helen Whipple
- F. A. Turner as Lew Ellinger
- Genevieve Blinn as Mrs. Campbell
- Charles West as Tom Denning
- L. M. Wells as Judge Henderson
- Clarence Geldart as Colonel Bailey
- Jim Blackwell as Harvey

== Preservation status ==
The film still exists and is preserved at the Gosfilmofond Russian state and the Library of Congress.
