= Don't Neglect Your Wife =

1921 film

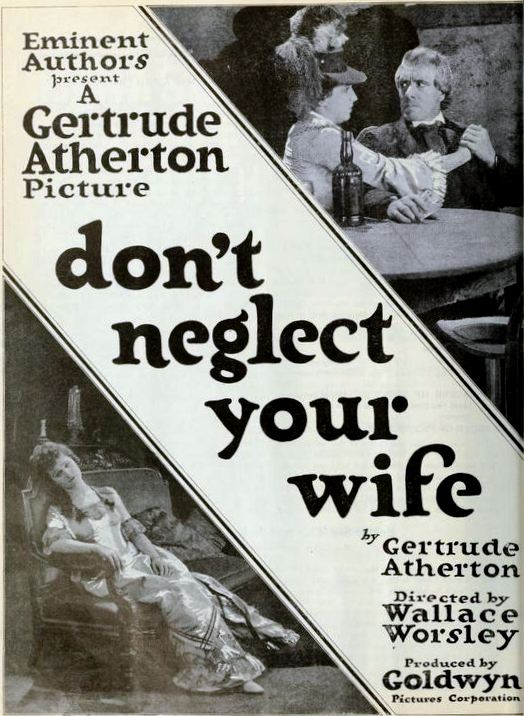
- Directed by: Wallace Worsley
- Written by: Gertrude Atherton; Louis Sherwin
- Produced by: Samuel Goldwyn
- Starring: Mabel Julienne Scott; Lewis Stone; Charles Clary
- Cinematography: Don Short
- Production company: Goldwyn Pictures
- Distributed by: Goldwyn Pictures
- Release date: July 31, 1921
- Running time: 60 minutes
- Country: United States
- Languages: Silent; English intertitles

Don't Neglect Your Wife is a 1921 American silent drama film directed by Wallace Worsley and starring Mabel Julienne Scott, Lewis Stone and Charles Clary.

This film was Gertrude Atherton's first story written specifically for the screen. It was produced under the working title Noblesse Oblige.'

== Cast ==
- Mabel Julienne Scott as Madeline
- Lewis Stone as Langdon Masters
- Charles Clary as Dr. Howard Talbot
- Kate Lester as Mrs. Hunt McLane
- Arthur Hoyt as Ben Travers
- Josephine Crowell as Mrs. Abott
- Darrell Foss as Holt
- Norma Gordon as Sybyl Geary
- Richard Tucker as George Geary
- R.D. MacLean as Mr. Hunt McLane

== Preservation ==
With no prints of Don't Neglect Your Wife located in any film archives, it is considered a lost film.

== Bibliography ==
- Connelly, Robert B. The Silents: Silent Feature Films, 1910-36, Volume 40, Issue 2. December Press, 1998.
- Munden, Kenneth White. The American Film Institute Catalog of Motion Pictures Produced in the United States, Part 1. University of California Press, 1997.
