= The Men of Zanzibar =

1922 film directed by Rowland V. Lee

- Directed by: Rowland V. Lee
- Written by: Richard Harding Davis; Edward LeSaint
- Produced by: William Fox
- Starring: William Russell; Ruth Renick; Claude Payton
- Cinematography: David Abel
- Production company: Fox Film Corporation
- Distributed by: Fox Film Corporation
- Release date: May 21, 1922
- Running time: 50 minutes
- Country: United States
- Languages: Silent; English intertitles

The Men of Zanzibar is a 1922 American silent mystery film directed by Rowland V. Lee and starring William Russell, Ruth Renick and Claude Payton. The American consul in Zanzibar is informed that a fugitive American has just reached the African coast, and becomes suspicious of a newly arrived man from Boston, Massachusetts.

== Cast ==
- William Russell as Hugh Hemingway
- Ruth Renick as Polly Adair
- Claude Payton as George Sheyer
- Harvey Clark as Wilbur Harris
- Arthur Morrison as Arthur Fearing
- Michael Dark as Sir George Firth
- Lila Leslie as Lady Firth

== Bibliography ==
- Solomon, Aubrey. The Fox Film Corporation, 1915-1935: A History and Filmography. McFarland, 2011.
