= Roughshod (1922 film) =

1922 film

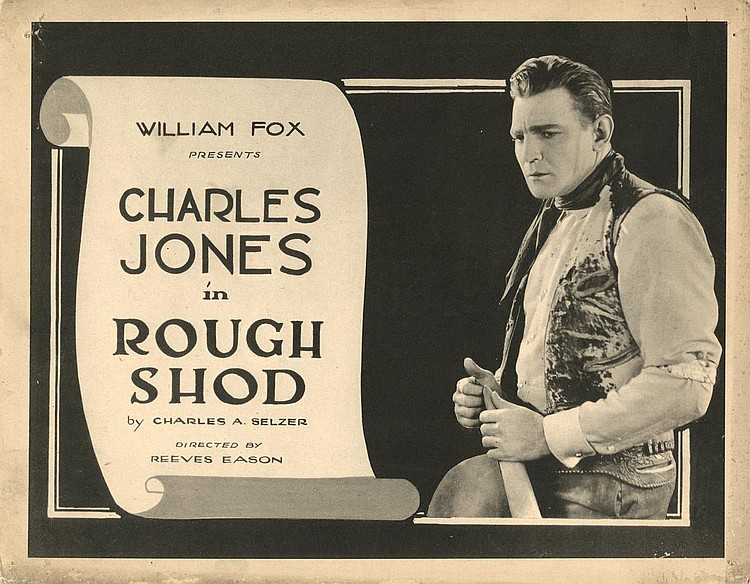
- Lobby card
- Directed by: B. Reeves Eason
- Written by: John Stone
- Based on: "West!"; 1922 novel by Charles Alden Seltzer
- Produced by: William Fox
- Starring: Buck Jones; Helen Ferguson; Ruth Renick
- Cinematography: Lucien N. Andriot
- Production company: Fox Film
- Distributed by: Fox Film
- Release date: June 4, 1922
- Running time: 50 minutes
- Country: United States
- Languages: Silent; English intertitles

Roughshod is a 1922 American silent Western film directed by B. Reeves Eason and starring Buck Jones, Helen Ferguson, and Ruth Renick.

== Plot ==
As described in a film magazine, Betty Lawson, just in Arizona from New York City, takes pity on Les Artwell, suspected of horse stealing, and upbraids 'Steel' Brannon, foreman of the Triangle L ranch, for dragging the fugitive from his saddle. Later, however, she learns that Artwell is a member of a gang of cattle thieves that is led by 'Satan' Latimer. A raid is made on the cattle stock of the Triangle L and Steel is badly wounded in the clash between the ranch men and the outlaws. Betty assists Steel to Les's cabin but there is detained by Satan Latimer, who takes her to a cave in the mountains. Steel follows them to a canyon and, after a terrific fight, whips Latimer and saves Betty.

== Cast ==
- Buck Jones as 'Steel' Brannon (credited as Charles Jones)
- Helen Ferguson as Betty Lawson
- Ruth Renick as Josephine Hamilton
- Maurice 'Lefty' Flynn as 'Satan' Latimer (credited as Maurice B. Flynn)
- Jack Rollens as Les Artwell
- Charles Le Moyne as Denver

== Bibliography ==
- Solomon, Aubrey. The Fox Film Corporation, 1915-1935: A History and Filmography. McFarland, 2011.
