= The Barrier (1917 film) =

1917 film by Edgar Lewis

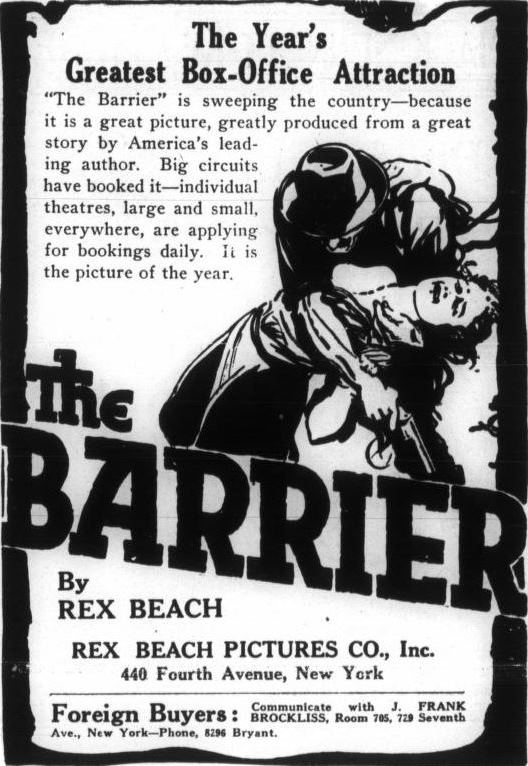
- Advertisement
- Directed by: Edgar Lewis
- Written by: Adrian Gil-Spear
- Based on: The Barrier by Rex Beach
- Produced by: Rex Beach; Benjamin P. Hampton
- Starring: Mabel Julienne Scott
- Cinematography: Edward Earle (not the actor Edward Earle)
- Edited by: Paul F. Maschke
- Music by: Frederick O. Hanks; Sol Levy
- Distributed by: State Rights
- Release date: February 1917
- Running time: 1 hr. 40 mins.; 10 reels
- Country: United States
- Language: Silent (English intertitles)

The Barrier is a lost 1917 American silent northwoods drama film directed by Edgar Lewis and starring Mabel Julienne Scott. It is based on the 1908 Rex Beach novel The Barrier.

The Beach novel was filmed again by MGM in 1926 as The Barrier starring Lionel Barrymore.

== Plot summary ==
A barrier stands between Lt. Meade Burrell and Necia, the woman he loves. That barrier is the fact that she's a "half-breed" — half-Indian and half-white, with an Indian mother and John Gale, a white trader, for a father. Although he has proposed marriage to Necia, she releases him from it when she realizes the damage that marrying a half-breed would do to him personally and professionally. One day, a man arrives in town with information that could solve everyone's problems.

== Cast ==
- Mabel Julienne Scott as Necia / Merridy
- Russell Simpson as John Gaylord / John Gale
- Howard Hall as Dan Bennett / Ben Stark
- Victor Sutherland as Lt. Meade Burrell
- Mitchell Lewis as Poleon Doret
- Edward Roseman as Runnion
- W. J. Gross as "No Creek" Lee
- Mary Carr as Alluna (credited as Mary Kennevan Carr)
