= Claude Payton =

American actor

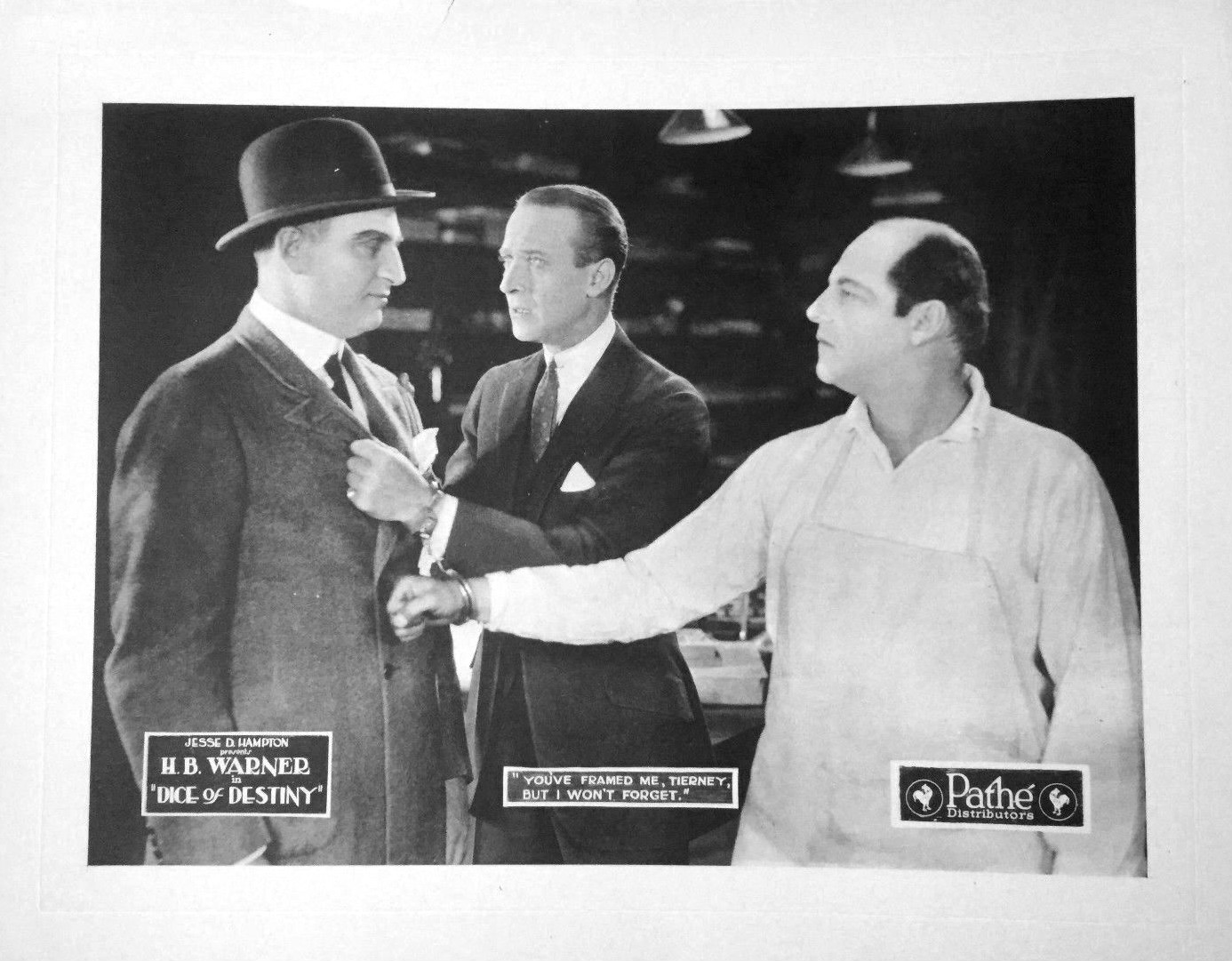
- Payton (left) on lobby card for Dice of Destiny, 1921
- Born: Claude Duval Payton; March 30, 1882; Centerville, Iowa, U.S.
- Died: March 1, 1955 (aged 72); Los Angeles, California, U.S.
- Occupation: Actor

Claude Duval Payton (March 30, 1882 in Centerville, Iowa – March 1, 1955 in Los Angeles, California) was an American actor in many silent films and other films.

On stage, Claude Payton toured with the Spooner Stock Company, which was headed by his brother, Corse Payton, and his sister, Cecil Spooner. By 1914, Claude was working at the Thanhouser film producing company in New Rochelle, New York, where he mainly played the roles of villains or lawmen in Western films. Although Claude Payton survived the transition from silent movies to films with sound, in 1935 he was mainly in minor supporting roles in films. Claude retired from the filmmaking business in the mid-1940s.

== Filmography ==
- Jean of the Wilderness (1914, Short) as Haskins (film debut)
- The Master Hand (1914, Short) as Chief of Detectives
- A Woman There Was (1919) as High Priest
- The Man Who Lost Himself (1920) as Prince Maniloff
- If I Were King (1920) as Montigney
- The Soul of Youth (1920) as Pete Moran
- Dice of Destiny (1920) as James Tierney
- When We Were 21 (1921) as Dave
- A Knight of the West (1921) as Ralph Barton
- The Grim Comedian (1921) as (uncredited)
- The Song of Life (1922) as Central Office Man
- Two-Fisted Jefferson (1922)
- The Masked Avenger (1922) as Bruno Douglas
- Desert's Crucible (1922) as Tex Fuller
- The Men of Zanzibar (1922) as George Sheyer
- The Desert Bridegroom (1922)
- Trooper O'Neil (1922) as Black Flood
- Do and Dare (1922) as Córdoba
- Bells of San Juan (1922) as Jim Garson
- Catch My Smoke (1922) as Tex Lynch
- The Devil's Dooryard (1923) as Fred Bradley
- The Law Rustlers (1923) as Doc Jordan
- Desert Rider (1923) as Rufe Kinkaid
- Skid Proof (1923) as Masters
- The Man from Wyoming (1924) as Jack Halloway
- The Back Trail (1924) as Gentleman Harry King
- The Desert Outlaw (1924) as Black Loomis
- Daring Chances (1924) as Sampson Burke
- The Riddle Rider (1924) as Victor Raymond
- Gold and the Girl (1925) as Rankin
- Dangerous Odds (1925)
- The Ridin' Streak (1925) as Sheriff
- The Texas Trail (1925) as Dan Merrill
- Ben-Hur (1925) as Jesus (uncredited)
- The Cohens and Kellys (1926) as Bit Role (uncredited)
- The Yellow Back (1926) as Bruce Condon
- The Western Whirlwind (1927) as Jeff Taylor
- Set Free (1927) as Burke Tanner
- The Crowd (1928) as Minor Role (uncredited)
- The Gate Crasher (1928) as Zanfield
- Dodging Danger (1929, Short)
- Say It with Songs (1929) as Judge
- The Great Divide (1929) as Minor Role (uncredited)
- Up the River (1930) as Guard (uncredited)
- Arsène Lupin (1932) as Gendarme (uncredited)
- The Last Frontier (1932, Serial) as Colonel Halliday
- Tex Takes a Holiday (1932) as Saunders
- Zoo in Budapest (1933) as Captain of Police (uncredited)
- Fargo Express (1933) as Goss Partner #1
- The Son of Kong (1933) as Sailor/Suspenders Peddler (uncredited)
- Thunder Over Texas (1934) as Bruce Laird
- Jealousy (1934) as Bit Role (uncredited)
- The Mighty Barnum (1934) as Spieler (uncredited)
- Les Misérables (1935) as Gendarme at Bishop's Home (uncredited)
- After the Dance (1935) as Guard (uncredited)
- The Public Menace (1935) as Detective (uncredited)
- Barbary Coast (1935) as Passenger (uncredited)
- A Night at the Opera (1935) as Police Captain (uncredited)
- One-Way Ticket (1935) as Detective (uncredited)
- Miss Pacific Fleet (1935) as Caretaker (uncredited)
- Anthony Adverse (1936) as Announcer of Guests at Ball (uncredited)
- San Quentin (1937) as Cop (uncredited)
- All American Sweetheart (1937) as Attendant (uncredited)
- Penrod and His Twin Brother (1938) as Deputy (uncredited)
- Broadway Musketeers (1938) as Policeman at Murder Scene (uncredited)
- The Spider's Web (1938, Serial) as Henchman Radarez (uncredited)
- Eternally Yours (1939) as Scotland Yard Man (uncredited)
- Tower of London (1939) as Councilman (final film) (uncredited)
