= No Woman Knows =

1921 film

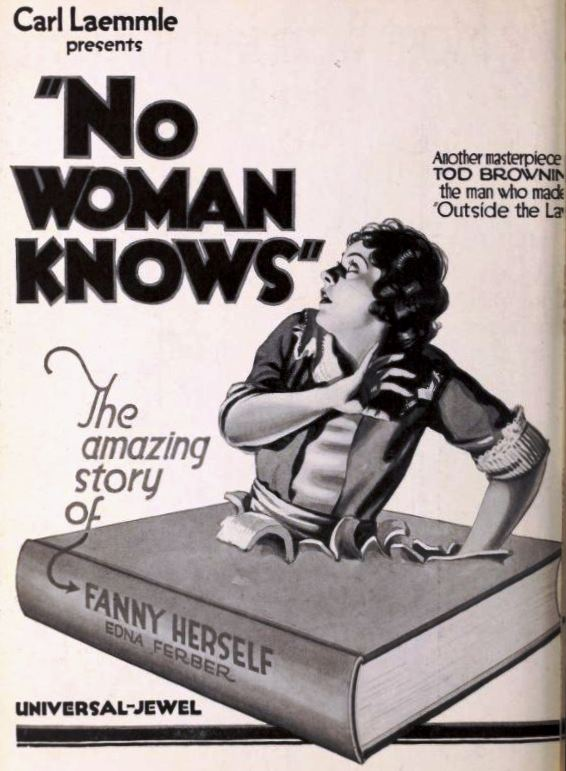
- Advertisement
- Directed by: Tod Browning
- Written by: Tod Browning; Edna Ferber; George Yohalem
- Starring: Max Davidson; Snitz Edwards
- Cinematography: William Fildew
- Distributed by: Universal Film Manufacturing Company
- Release date: September 19, 1921
- Running time: 70 minutes
- Country: United States
- Language: Silent (English intertitles)

No Woman Knows is a 1921 American silent drama film directed by Tod Browning. It was adopted from the Edna Ferber story Fanny Herself (1917). A complete print of the film survives at the Filmoteca Española in Madrid.

== Plot ==
As described in a film magazine, the Brandeis operate a little dry goods store in Winnebago, Wisconsin. Ferdinand and Molly are the parents and Fanny and Theodore are the daughter and son, with Aloysius an adopted Irish youth. Theodore shows talent for the violin and under Herr Bauer he practices several hours each day. Schabelitz, a famous violinist, during a concert tour hears Theodore play and suggests to the Brandeis that he be sent to Europe to study.

Times are poor, but Molly with the assistance of Rabbi Thalman persuades "Papa" Brandeis that it should be done, and the Boy is sent. Molly works the store, does the housework, and looks after the children, happy in the thought that some day her boy will become famous and rescue her from drudgery. By and by Papa dies, and Fanny, grown to womanhood, denies herself all pleasures such as a new dress in order to maintain Theodore at Dresden. What they do not know is that her brother's frequent requests for money are to keep him and his wife, whom he married the first year he was abroad, from starvation.

One day when Fanny is returning home from skating, the only pleasure she allows herself, she encounters tragedy in discovering her mother dead. Fanny breaks down, and unburdens her pent-up feelings. Left to her own resources she goes to Chicago and gains employment in a mail order house. Theodore, having been deserted by his wife, returns home with his baby. They take up their abode with Fanny, and she becomes attached to the youngster. Through her influence with her employer Michael Fenger to have Theodore give a concert and looks forward to the event as a personal triumph. However, on the evening of the event Theodore receives message from his wife asking him to return to her. He leaves a note to Fanny pinned to the telegram stating what he has done.

== Cast ==
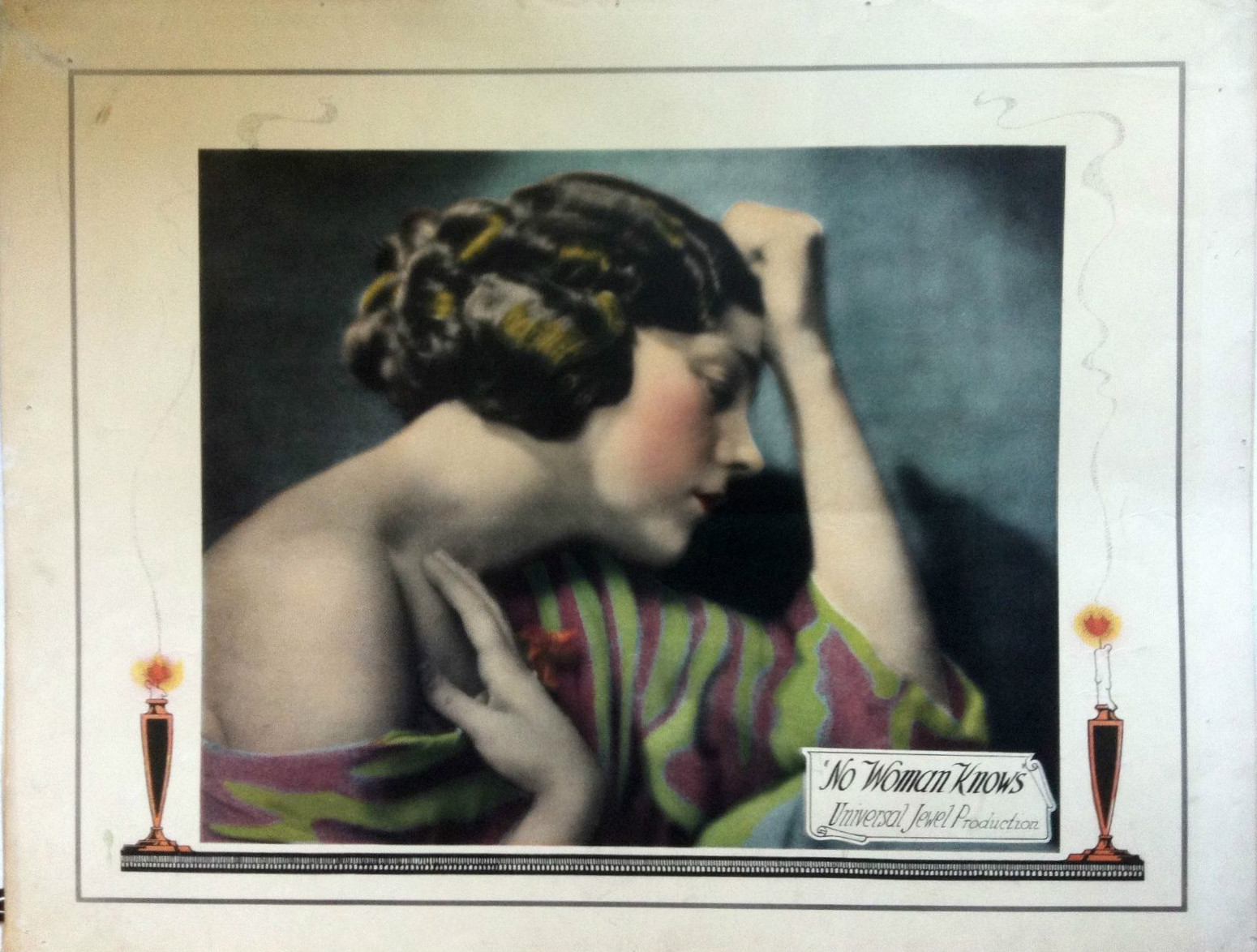
Lobby card

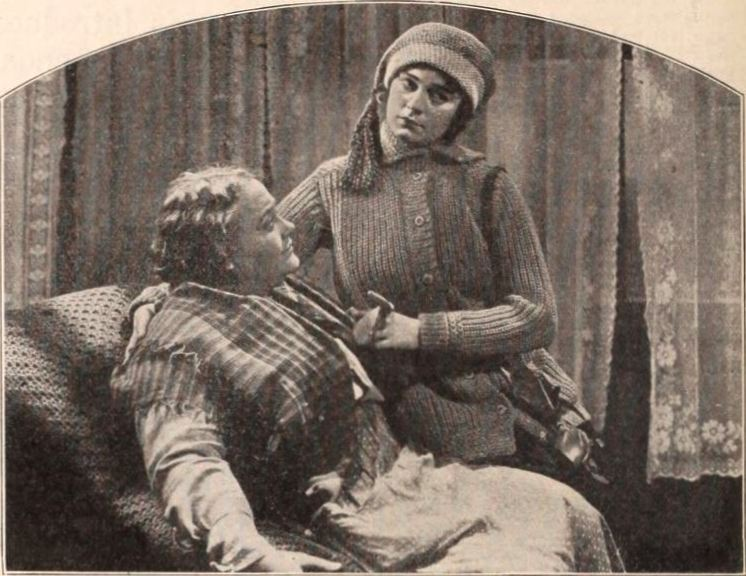
Grace Marvin and Mabel Julienne Scott

- Max Davidson as Ferdinand Brandeis
- Snitz Edwards as Herr Bauer
- Grace Marvin as Molly Brandeis
- Bernice Radom as Little Fanny Brandeis
- Danny Hoy as Aloysius
- E. Alyn Warren as Rabbi Thalman (credited as E.A. Warren)
- Raymond Lee as Little Theodore Brandeis
- Josef Swickard as The Great Schabelitz
- Richard Cummings as Father Ritzpatrick
- Joseph Sterns as Little Clarence Hyle
- Mabel Julienne Scott as Fanny Brandeis
- John Davidson as Theodore Brandeis
- Earl Schenck as Clarence Hyle
- Stuart Holmes as Michael Fenger
