= Bread (1924 film) =

1924 film by Victor Schertzinger

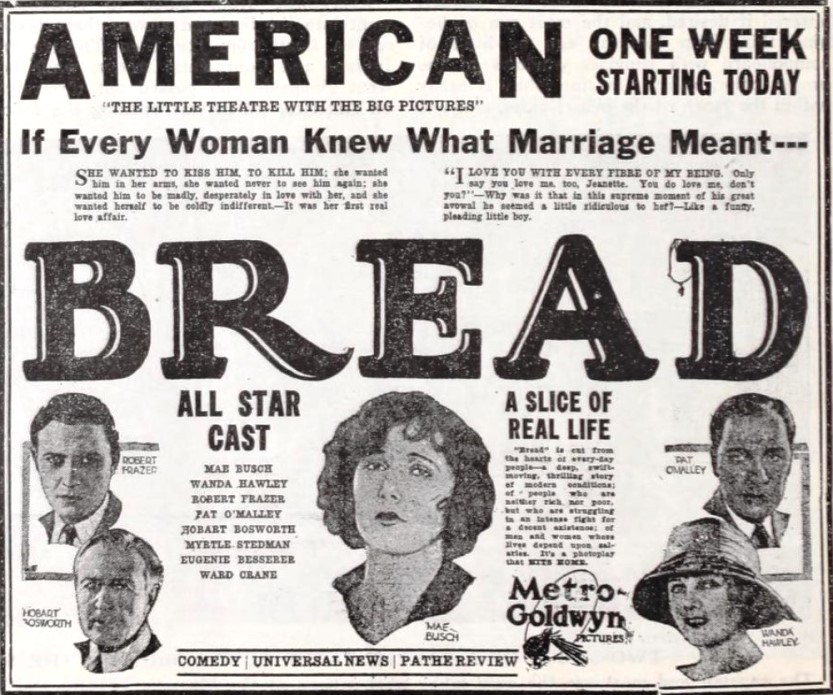
- Newspaper advertisement
- Directed by: Victor Schertzinger
- Written by: Lenore J. Coffee and Albert Lewin
- Based on: Bread by Charles G. Norris
- Produced by: Louis B. Mayer; Metro-Goldwyn-Mayer (as Metro-Goldwyn)
- Starring: Mae Busch; Pat O'Malley; Robert Frazer; Wanda Hawley
- Distributed by: Metro Goldwyn (later MGM)
- Release date: August 4, 1924
- Running time: 70 minutes
- Country: United States
- Language: Silent (English intertitles)

Bread is a 1924 American drama film directed by Victor Schertzinger. Based on the best-selling novel of the same name by Charles G. Norris, the film stars Mae Busch.

== Cast ==
- Mae Busch as Jeanette Sturgis
- Robert Frazer as Martin Devlin
- Pat O'Malley as Roy Beardsley
- Wanda Hawley as Alice Sturgis
- Eugenie Besserer as Mrs. Sturgis
- Hobart Bosworth as Mr. Corey
- Myrtle Stedman as Mrs. Corey
- Ward Crane as Gerald Kenyon
- Raymond Lee as Ralph Beardsley
- Valentine Black as Child (uncredited)

== Preservation ==
With no prints of Bread located in any film archives, it is a lost film.
