= Raymond Lee (film historian) =

American actor and film historian

- Born: January 3, 1910
- Died: June 26, 1974 (aged 64)
- Years active: 1915-1927 (as actor)

Raymond Lee (January 3, 1910 – June 26, 1974) was an American child actor in films who became a film historian and author. His film career lasted from 1915 until 1927.

He was one of the children cast in Sidney Franklin's series Fox Sunshine Kiddies. Lee's film roles included a part in The Kid, a Charlie Chaplin film

He wrote about animal actors in 1970.

== Selected filmography ==
- The Babes in the Woods (1917)
- The Kid (1921)
- No Woman Knows (1921)
- Long Live the King (1923)
- Bread (1924)
- The Dramatic Life of Abraham Lincoln (1924)

== Bibliography ==
- Fit for the Chase; Cars and the Movies by Raymond Lee, 1969
- The faces of Hollywood by Clarence Sinclair Bull and Raymond Lee, A. S. Barnes, 1969
- Pearl White: the peerless fearless girl by Manuel Weltmann and Raymond Lee, A. S. Barnes, 1969
- Gloria Swanson by Richard M. Hudson and Raymond Lee, A. S. Barnes, 1970
- DeMille: the man and his pictures y Gabe Essoe and Raymond Lee, A. S. Barnes, 1970
- Not So Dumb; The Life and Times of Animal Actors by Raymond Lee, 1970
- The Films of Mary Pickford (1971)
- Gangsters and Hoodlums; The Underworld in Cinema by Raymond Lee and B. C. Van Hecke, 1971
