= Ask Dad =

1929 film

- Directed by: Hugh Faulcon
- Written by: Joseph Jackson
- Starring: Edward Everett Horton; Winston Miller; Ruth Renick
- Cinematography: William Hyer
- Distributed by: Educational Pictures / Educational Film Exchanges
- Release date: February 17, 1929
- Running time: 20 minutes
- Country: United States
- Language: English

Ask Dad is a 1929 American Pre-Code film directed by Hugh Faulcon and starring Edward Everett Horton and Winston Miller.

== Cast ==
- Edward Everett Horton as Dad
- Winston Miller as Tommy
- Ruth Renick as Miss Grace Wilson
