= 45 Calibre Echo =

1932 film

- Directed by: Bruce M. Mitchell
- Written by: Carl Krusada
- Produced by: Robert J. Horner
- Starring: Jack Perrin; Ben Corbett; Elinor Fair
- Cinematography: Edward A. Kull
- Edited by: William Austin
- Production company: Robert J. Horner Productions
- Distributed by: Economy Film Service
- Release date: February 5, 1932
- Running time: 60 minutes
- Country: United States
- Language: English

45 Calibre Echo is a 1932 American Western film directed by Bruce M. Mitchell. It starred Jack Perrin, Ben Corbett and Elinor Fair. The supporting cast features Ruth Renick in her final theatrical film role.

== Cast ==
- Jack Perrin as Jack
- Ben Corbett as Bennie
- Elinor Fair as Betty
- Olin Francis as Burly Henchman
- Richard Cramer as Saloon Owner
- George Chesebro as Henchman
- Jimmy Aubrey as Jim - the Sidekick
- C.V. Bussey as Sheriff
- Ruth Renick as Jack's Sister
- Murdock MacQuarrie as Old Man in Saloon

== Bibliography ==
- Michael R. Pitts. Poverty Row Studios, 1929–1940: An Illustrated History of 55 Independent Film Companies, with a Filmography for Each. McFarland & Company, 2005.
