= Bells of San Juan =

1922 film

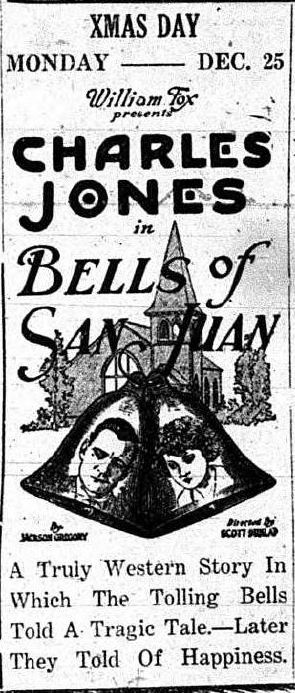
- Newspaper advertisement
- Directed by: Scott R. Dunlap
- Written by: Rex Taylor
- Based on: The Bells of San Juan by Jackson Gregory
- Produced by: William Fox
- Starring: Buck Jones
- Cinematography: Dev Jennings
- Distributed by: Fox Film Corporation
- Release date: October 15, 1922
- Running time: 35 minutes
- Country: United States
- Languages: Silent; English intertitles

Bells of San Juan is a 1922 American silent Western film directed by Scott Dunlap and starring Buck Jones. It was based on the Jackson Gregory novel The Bells of San Juan. It was the first of five films where Claude Payton was cast alongside Jones.

== Plot ==
Roderick Norton is a sheriff on a crusade to find and apprehend the man who murdered his father. Unable to restore order in the mining town where he is appointed, he loses favor with the townspeople. The villain, revealed to be Jim Garson, and his gang make life miserable for Norton, culminating with the abduction of his girlfriend, frontier doctor Dorothy Page, by Garson's henchmen the Rickard brothers, in order to entrap the hero. Roderick is successful in rescuing Dorothy, but in the process he suffers a head injury which changes his personality, turning him into a thief whom his friends are unable to trust. He is brought back to his old self through the medical ministrations of Dorothy, and is able to obtain a confession regarding the murder of his father from the Rickards, allowing the capture and arrest of Garson.

== Cast ==
- Charles "Buck" Jones as Roderick Norton
- Fritzi Brunette as Dorothy Page
- Claude Payton as Jim Garson
- Harry Todd as Dr. Caleb Patton
- Hardy Kirkland as John Engel
- Katherine Key as Florrie Engel
- William Steele as Kid Rickland
- Otto Matieson as Antone
- Sid Jordan as Tom Cutter

== Reception ==
Motion Picture News reviewed the film on October 28, 1922. It found the plot entirely predictable, and thought that it was one of Jones' weaker films.
