= The Jucklins (film) =

1921 film by George Melford

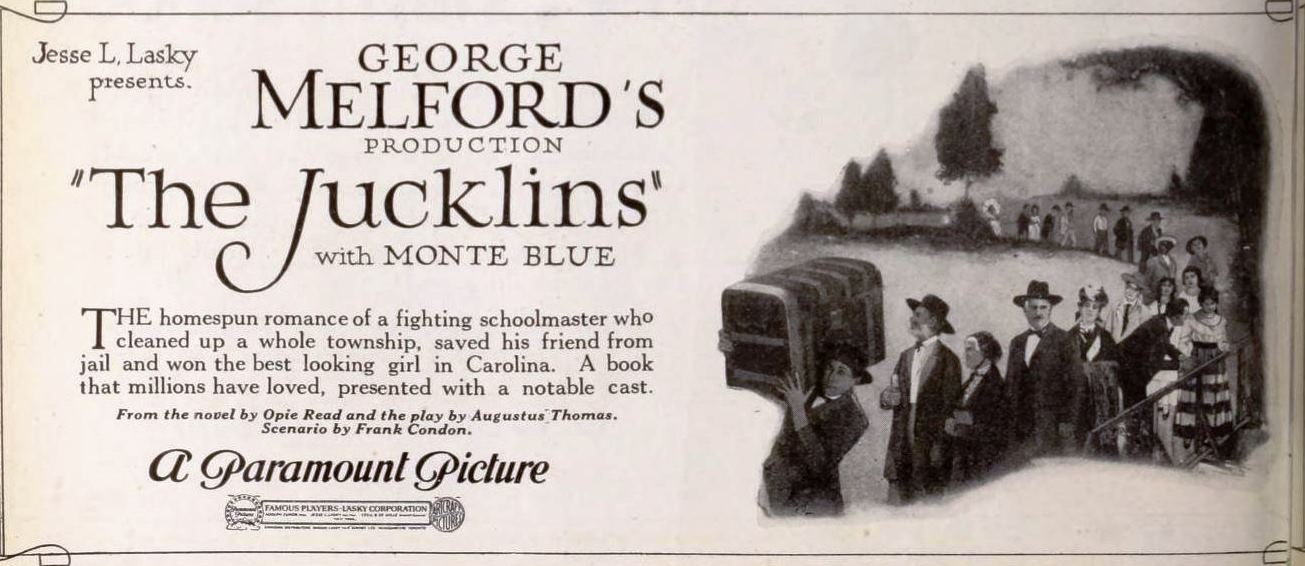
- Advertisement
- Directed by: George Melford
- Screenplay by: Frank Condon
- Based on: The Jucklins by Opie Read
- Produced by: Jesse L. Lasky
- Starring: Winter Hall; Mabel Julienne Scott; Monte Blue; Ruth Renick; Fanny Midgley; Z. Wall Covington; J.M. Dumont
- Cinematography: Paul P. Perry
- Production company: Famous Players–Lasky Corporation
- Distributed by: Paramount Pictures
- Release date: January 9, 1921
- Running time: 50 minutes
- Country: United States
- Language: Silent (English intertitles)

The Jucklins is a lost 1921 American silent drama film directed by George Melford and written by Frank Condon, based on the novel The Jucklins by Opie Read. The film stars Winter Hall, Mabel Julienne Scott, Monte Blue, Ruth Renick, Fanny Midgley, Z. Wall Covington, and J.M. Dumont. The film was released on January 9, 1921, by Paramount Pictures.

== Cast ==
- Winter Hall as General Lundsford
- Mabel Julienne Scott as Guinea Jucklin
- Monte Blue as Bill Hawes
- Ruth Renick as Millie Lundsford
- Fanny Midgley as Susan Jucklin
- Z. Wall Covington as Alf Jucklin
- J.M. Dumont as Chyd Lundsford
- Clarence Burton as Dr. Etheridge
- Guy Oliver as Sheriff Parker
- Robert Brower as Attorney Conkwright
- Jack Herbert as Scott Aimes
- Jack Hull as Bill Aimes
- Walter F. Scott as Jim Aimes
- Frank Weatherwax as Johnny Aimes
- William Boyd as Dan Stuart
- Charles Stanton Ogle as Lim Judklin
- Jack Byron
