= The Fire Bride =

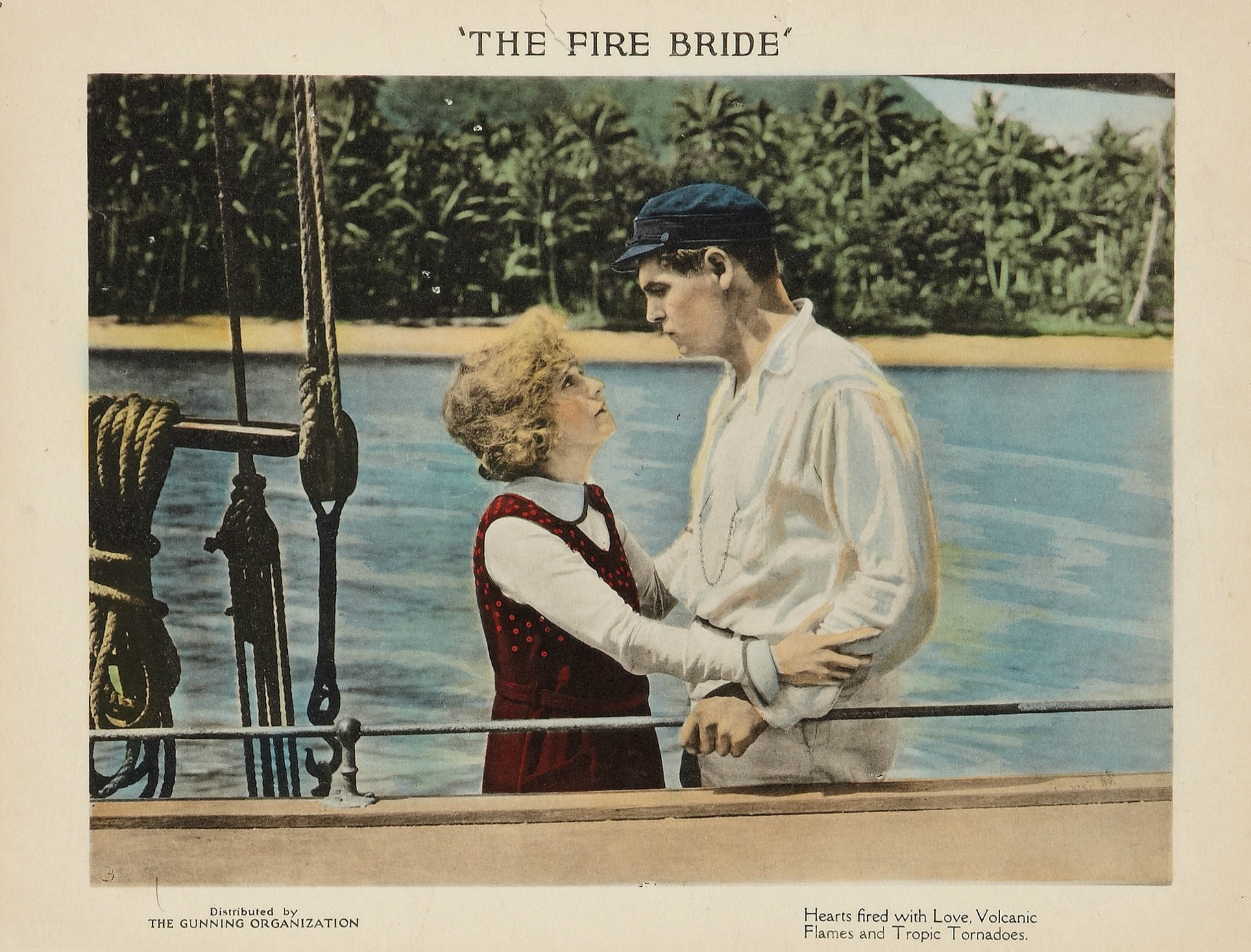
- Directed by: Arthur Rosson
- Written by: William F. Alder
- Produced by: William F. Alder; S.M. Unander
- Starring: Ruth Renick; Edward Hearn; Walt Whitman
- Cinematography: Arthur Ross
- Production company: Wid Gunning
- Distributed by: Robertson-Cole Distributing Corporation
- Release date: March 18, 1922
- Running time: 50 minutes
- Country: United States
- Languages: Silent; English intertitles

The Fire Bride is a 1922 American silent adventure film directed by Arthur Rosson and starring Ruth Renick, Edward Hearn and Walt Whitman. The film's working title was The Lagoon of Desire. It was based on the 1921 novel The Lagoon of Desire by William Fisher Alder. Alder formed the Far East Productions Company with his producing partner, S. M. Unander, in order to make films in far-flung locations.

The Fire Bride was filmed over several months in Tahiti and Mo'orea in French Polynesia and featured many scenes "in which real natives are seen in war-like dances and other ceremonial expositions". The film was reportedly the first movie to be shot in the Pacific Islands. Lead actress Ruth Renick later wrote an account of her time in Tahiti which was published in the March 1922 edition of Photoplay magazine.

== Plot ==
The story opens with the suicide of a young woman who has been lured onto a ship by a South Seas skipper, Captain Blackton. The ship is later chartered by an elderly man, Captain Markham, who aims to retrieve treasure that he hid on a Pacific Island many years ago. Markham is accompanied by his daughter Lois. First mate on the ship is Steve Maitland, a young man who has shipped with Blackton to find out the circumstances of his sister's death.

Arriving at the island where the treasue is buried, the group witnesses a ceremony where the islanders choose a Fire Bride for sacrifice to the gods. Blackton goes with Markham to dig up the gold. Blackton kills Markham after they find the gold but tells Lois and Steve that the pair were attacked by natives. Blackton goes to bury Markham but makes the natives angry when he dishonors Atel, the Fire Bride. Steve warns Blackton that the natives are angry, but then discovers that it was Blackton who caused the death of his sister. He helps the natives subdue Blackton, and Blackton is killed for mistreating the Fire Bride.

== Cast ==
- Ruth Renick as Lois Markham
- Edward Hearn as Steve Maitland
- Walt Whitman as Captain Markham
- Fred R. Stanton as Captain Blackton
- Princess Teri'inui o Tahiti, daughter of Queen Marau, the last queen of Tahiti.

== Preservation ==
With no holdings located in archives, The Fire Bride is considered a lost film.

== Bibliography ==
- Robert B. Connelly. The Silents: Silent Feature Films, 1910-36, Volume 40, Issue 2. December Press, 1998.
