= A Yankee from the West =

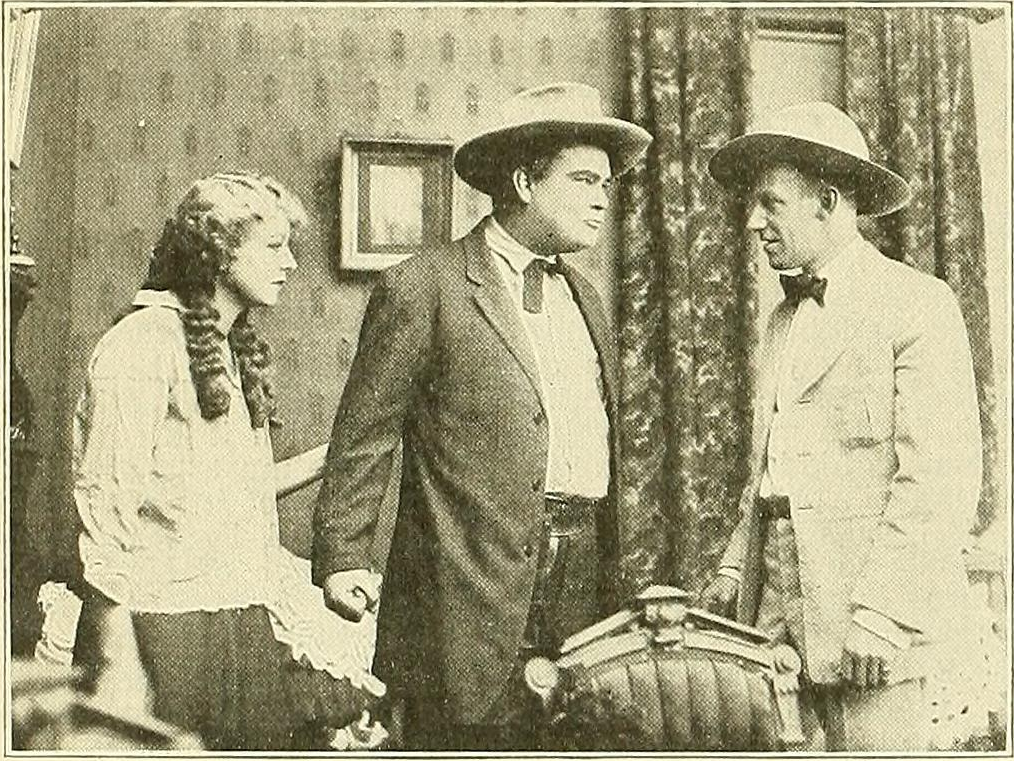
- Directed by: George Siegmann
- Written by: Mary H. O'Connor (scenario)
- Based on: A Yankee from the West by Opie Read
- Starring: Wallace Reid; Seena Owen
- Cinematography: Duke Hayward
- Production company: Majestic Film Company
- Distributed by: Mutual Film
- Release date: August 19, 1915
- Running time: 4 reels
- Country: United States
- Language: Silent (English intertitles)

A Yankee from the West is a 1915 American silent romantic drama film directed by George Siegmann and starring Wallace Reid and Seena Owen. Based on the novel of the same name by Opie Read.

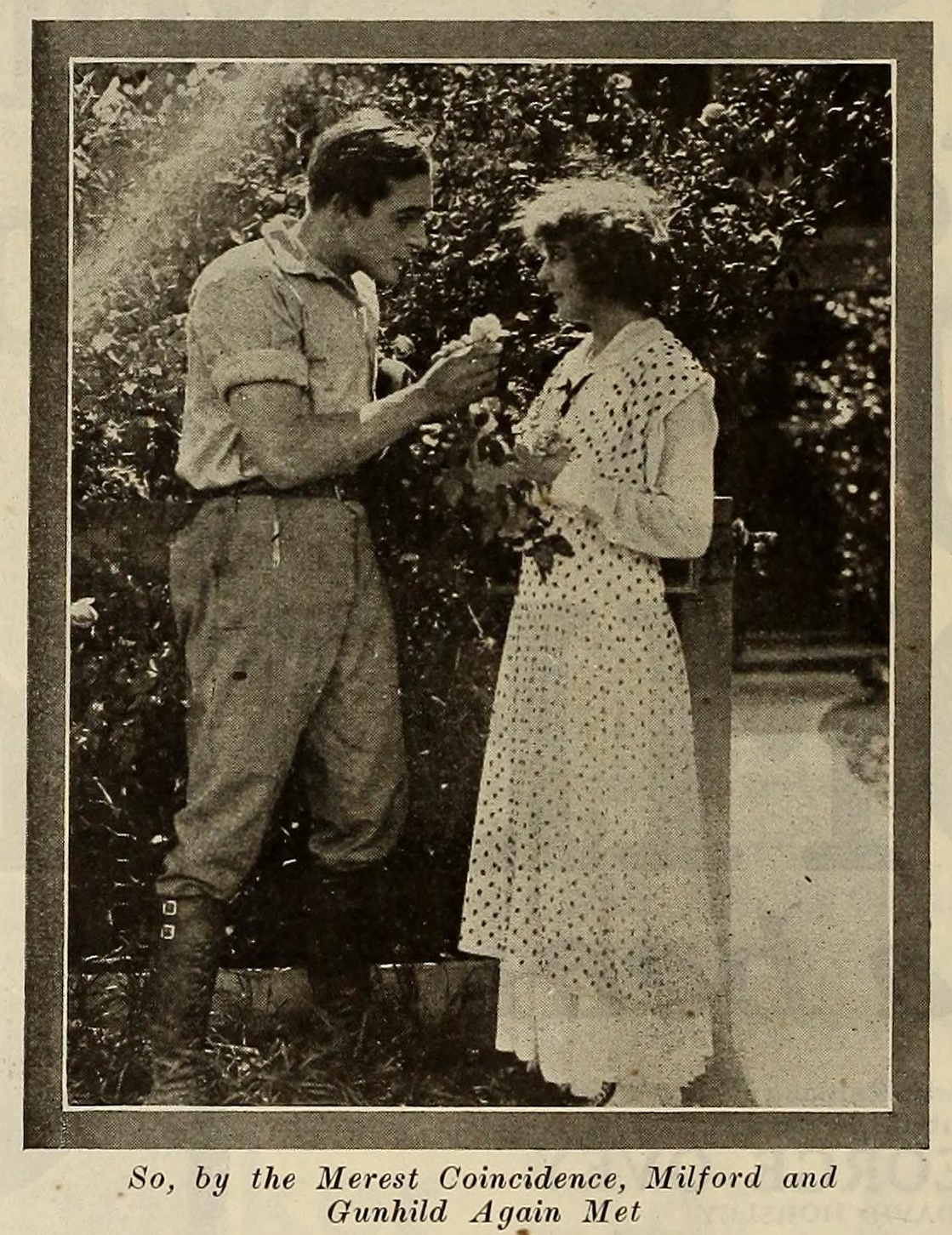
A scene with Seena Owen and Wallace Reid

== Plot ==
Billy "Hell-in-the-Mud" Milford is a Harvard graduate who has "gone bad," and is sent to a small western town as a station agent. Shortly after starting his job, he loses it due to his heavy drinking. His friend Jim Dorsey asks him to assist in holding up the railroad superintendent and paymaster who are on their way to pay mine workers. After the robbery, Billy's residence is raided by the police but they fail to turn up the stolen money. Gunhild, niece of the boarding house proprietor, has fallen in love with Billy and insists on his innocence. Her faith in him makes him want to go straight, he rents a farm and she gains a position as a traveling companion for a professor's wife and educates herself. The professor's health fails and he settles down in the house next to Billy, where Gunhild and Billy meet again and rejoice. Jim Dorsey, who has become an actor, is back in town. He threatens Gunhild that he will expose Billy's secret, when Billy enters the scene and is decked by Jim. After such an embarrassing incident, Billy takes boxing lessons from the local blacksmith and soon is ready to meet Jim again for a rematch. He confesses to Gunhild that he did rob the paymaster, and they get engaged to be married. The earnings from the farm are enough that he can pay back the paymaster, and takes the large sum of money to the superintendent, who is so struck by his honesty, he hands the money to Gunhild as a wedding present. The two of them then leave to start their lives with a clean slate.

== Cast ==
- Wallace Reid as Billy Milford, Hell-in-the Mud
- Seena Owen as Gunhild, a Norwegian Girl (as Signe Auen)
- Tom Wilson as Jim Dorsey, Milford's Pal
- Josephine Crowell as Mrs. Stuvic, an Illinois Matron
- Chris Lynton as Professor Emerton
- William H. Brown as Jan Hagnerg, Gunhild's Uncle
- Al W. Filson as Whitney Mills, R.R. Superintendent
- George Siegmann as Sheriff Dick
- Fred Gamble as The Railroad Superintendent

== Production ==
Henry B. Walthall was originally cast as Billy Milford, but early in production, the role was recast for Wallace Reid.

== Reception ==
Motion Picture News reviewer Harvey F. Thew gave the film a positive review despite its "hackneyed story," and described the film as "acceptable."

Louis Reeves Harrison for Moving Picture World gave the film a mostly positive review, as the reviewer found the story "drags" at moments, but praised the acting, saying "Wallace Reid, Signe Auen and Tom Wilson give vitality to their roles every moment they are in evidence on the screen."

Motography reviewer John C. Garrett gave the film a positive review, despite the reviewer's opinion that Seena Owen "does not have a great opportunity to display her dramatic ability in this picture."

Variety's review was mixed, as the reviewer found the story's ending to be improbable but acting to be "excellent." The writer ended the review with "Other than the fight scene there is little to lift it out of the ranks of the ordinary features which filmize western life."
