= Times Have Changed =

1923 film by James Flood

- Directed by: James Flood
- Written by: Elmer Davis (novel); John Stone
- Produced by: William Fox
- Starring: William Russell; Mabel Julienne Scott; Charles West
- Cinematography: Joseph Brotherton
- Production company: Fox Film
- Distributed by: Fox Film
- Release date: October 7, 1923
- Country: United States
- Languages: Silent; English intertitles

Times Have Changed is a lost 1923 American silent comedy-drama film directed by James Flood and starring William Russell, Mabel Julienne Scott and Charles West.

== Cast ==
- William Russell as Mark O'Rell
- Mabel Julienne Scott as Marjorie
- Charles West as Al Keeley
- Martha Mattox as Aunt Cordelia
- Edwin B. Tilton as Uncle Hinton
- George Atkinson as Cousin Felix
- Allene Ray as Irene Laird
- Dick La Reno as Jim Feener
- Gus Leonard as Gabe Gooch
- Jack Curtis as Dirty Dan

== Production ==
Production began in late May, 1923 and finished by late June.

== Preservation ==
With no holdings located in archives, Times Have Changed is considered a lost film.

== Bibliography ==
- Solomon, Aubrey. The Fox Film Corporation, 1915-1935: A History and Filmography. McFarland, 2011.
