= Behold My Wife! (1934 film) =

1934 film by Mitchell Leisen

- Theatrical poster
- Directed by: Mitchell Leisen
- Written by: Sir Gilbert Parker (novel); Grover Jones (screenplay); Vincent Lawrence (screenplay)
- Produced by: B. P. Schulberg; Adolph Zukor
- Starring: Sylvia Sidney; Gene Raymond
- Cinematography: Leon Shamroy
- Music by: John Leipold
- Distributed by: Paramount Pictures
- Release date: December 7, 1934
- Running time: 79 minutes
- Country: United States
- Language: English

Behold My Wife! is a 1934 drama film directed by Mitchell Leisen. It stars Sylvia Sidney and Gene Raymond. Based on a novel by Sir Gilbert Parker, The Translation of a Savage, the story had been filmed before in the silent era in 1920 as Behold My Wife! starring Mabel Julienne Scott and Milton Sills. One of the plot's themes is a white man's romance and eventual marriage to an Apache woman.

== Plot ==
Michael Carter, a young New York socialite, returns home drunk, telling the butler that he intends to marry Mary White the next day. The butler talks to Michael's parents, and the next morning, Michael's sister Diana pays a visit to Mary's apartment and ends the relationship because Michael's family finds the girl disgraceful. Diana tells Mary that Michael has left for France, and that he often falls in love with women and promises to wed them but then leaves them "at the church." Mary can't believe it, but Diana's lies are confirmed over the phone by Michael's butler. Diana presents the sobbing Mary with a check and a ticket to California, then exits. But just as Diana is about to drive in triumph, she hears a scream and sees the lifeless body of Mary on the street below her apartment. Diana tries to make excuses to Michael, who only vows vengeance.

In his despair about the loss of Mary, Michael drives out West stopping at many bars. At one bar he meets an intoxicated Apache man named Pete and invites him to share a drink from his bottle. Pete's girlfriend is the Apache Indian Tonita. Pete pulls out his pistol and in a fight he shoots Michael in the shoulder. Tonita tries to save her Indian friend, and Michael asks her to marry him as a way to get even with his prejudiced, status-seeking family.

At the station the family is awaiting Michael and everyone knows about Michael and Tonita. Michael's sister Diana proposes a big reception for the newlyweds and invites important people. The evening of the reception she sneaks into Tonita's room and convinces her to wear a beautiful night dress, whereas Michael wanted to dress her in her traditional Apache clothes to embarrass his parents. Tonita is beautiful and answers cleverly to impertinent people, but Michael is furious because he feels his family has triumphed over him. He tells Tonita about his rage against his family, and she angrily leaves with Bob Prentice. Diana follows them to Prentice's apartment and tells Prentice (who is her lover) that she left her husband for him. But Prentice doesn't want her back, so Diana finds a revolver and shoots him. Tonita proposes to take the blame as she feels she hasn't any reason to live and gives herself up to the police. Michael comes to Prentice's apartment and finds the body of Prentice. Michael makes up a confession and tells the police that he killed Prentice. But at the police station, his wife Tonita said that she killed Prentice in order to save Michael. When Michael is alone with Tonita, she confesses that his sister Diana killed Prentice. The police have been secretly listening to Tonita's confession so the married couple can now pursue their own life together.

== Cast ==
- Sylvia Sidney as Tonita Storm Cloud
- Gene Raymond as Michael Carter
- Laura Hope Crews as Mrs. Hubert Carter
- H. B. Warner as Hubert Carter
- Juliette Compton as Diana Carter Curson
- Monroe Owsley as Bob Prentice
- Ann Sheridan as Mary White
- Charlotte Granville as Mrs. Sykes
- Kenneth Thomson as Jim Curson
- Dean Jagger as Pete
- Eric Blore as Benson (butler)
- Charles Middleton as Juan Storm Cloud
- Rina De Liguoro as Countess Slavotski

Rest of cast listed alphabetically:

- Eddie 'Rochester' Anderson as Chauffeur (uncredited)
- Cosmo Kyrle Bellew as Mr. Lawson (uncredited)
- Neal Burns as Reporter at Train (uncredited)
- Edward Gargan as Det. Connolly (uncredited)
- Gwenllian Gill as Ms. Copperthwaite (uncredited)
- Otto Hoffman as Minister (uncredited)
