= The Abysmal Brute (film) =

1923 film

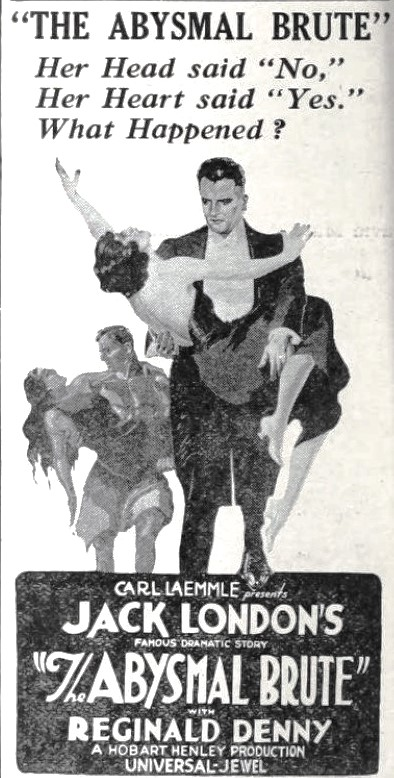
- Advertisement
- Directed by: Hobart Henley
- Written by: Andrew Percival Younger
- Based on: The Abysmal Brute by Jack London
- Starring: Reginald Denny; Mabel Julienne Scott; Charles K. French
- Cinematography: Charles J. Stumar
- Production company: Universal Pictures
- Distributed by: Universal Pictures
- Release date: April 15, 1923
- Running time: 80 minutes
- Country: United States
- Language: Silent (English intertitles)

The Abysmal Brute is a lost 1923 American silent sports drama film directed by Hobart Henley and starring Reginald Denny, Mabel Julienne Scott, and Charles K. French. It is an adaptation of the 1911 novel The Abysmal Brute by Jack London. The film received mixed reception, with one reviewer stating that the film was not a perfect adaptation of the novel. Comedic scenes, that were not in the novel, were added to the film by leading actor Reginald Denny.

== Plot ==
A boxer raised in the mountains by his father comes to San Francisco and enjoys great success, but his lack of social skills means he struggles to romance the socialite with whom he has fallen in love.

== Cast ==
- Reginald Denny as Pat Glendon, Jr
- Mabel Julienne Scott as Maude Sangster
- Charles K. French as Pat Glendon, Sr
- Hayden Stevenson as Sam Stubener
- David Torrence as Mortimer Sangster
- George Stewart as Wilfred Sangster
- Buddy Messinger as Buddy Sangster
- Crauford Kent as Deane Warner
- Dorothea Wolbert as Mrs. MacTavish
- Julia Brown as Violet MacTavish
- Harry Mann as Abe Levinsky
- Kid Wagner as Battling Levinsky
- Jack Herrick as Rough House Ratigan
- Irene Haisman as Gwendolyn
- Nell Craig as Daisy Emerson
- Will Walling as Farrell

== Production ==
The Minneapolis Star wrote that the film is not like the book, with only the name of the book and characters being used. The reviewer mentioned that romance is only a small part of the novel and that there is "painfully dragged-in comedy relief" in the film. The actor Reginald Denny added comedic scenes to the film which he said was "'the hokum' of an adaptation of Jack London's boxing story". Carl Laemmle "dedicated the film to The American Legion because of the wonderful spirit of clean athletics engendered in young American manhood by the war and the subsequent veteran activities".

AllMovie said, "Since his British accent remained conveniently unheard during the silent era, Reginald Denny made a wonderful all-American hero". Virginia Valli was originally meant to have the role of Mabel Julienne Scott. Shannon Day and Mae Busch were reported to be in the cast at first, but neither actress appeared in the film. Multiple boxers, who were known prizefighters, appeared in the film. The film was originally scheduled to premiere in the fall of 1922, but the release was delayed to film The Shock.

== Reception ==
The Pennsylvania School Journal recommended the film for Children's Book Week from November 11 to November 17, 1923.

The Educational Screen said, "A slow-moving, but sincere and well-acted filming of one of Jack London's tales". The Yonkers Herald wrote that women will enjoy Denny's "pleasing personality" and that men will enjoy "the masculinity of the story" and its "series of thrilling prize-ring sequences".

== Preservation ==
With no holdings located in archives, The Abysmal Brute is considered a lost film.

== Bibliography ==
- Munden, Kenneth White. The American Film Institute Catalog of Motion Pictures Produced in the United States, Part 1. University of California Press, 1997.
