= The Mollycoddle =

1920 film by Victor Fleming, Joseph Henabery

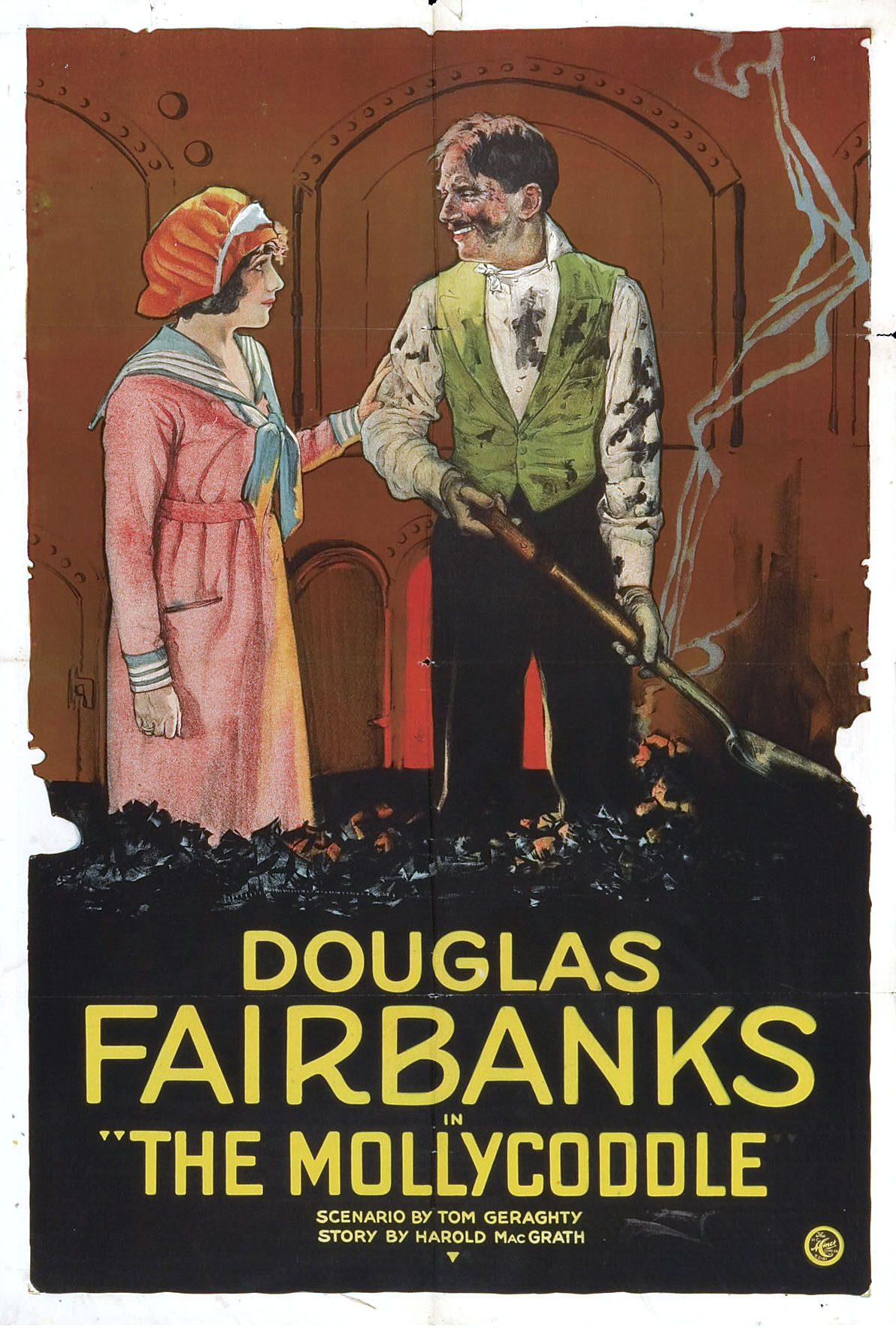
- Theatrical release poster
- Directed by: Victor Fleming
- Written by: Thomas J. Geraghty; Harold MacGrath
- Starring: Douglas Fairbanks; Wallace Beery
- Cinematography: William McGann; Harris Thorpe
- Distributed by: United Artists
- Release date: June 13, 1920
- Running time: 86 minutes
- Country: United States
- Language: Silent (English intertitles)

The Mollycoddle (1920)

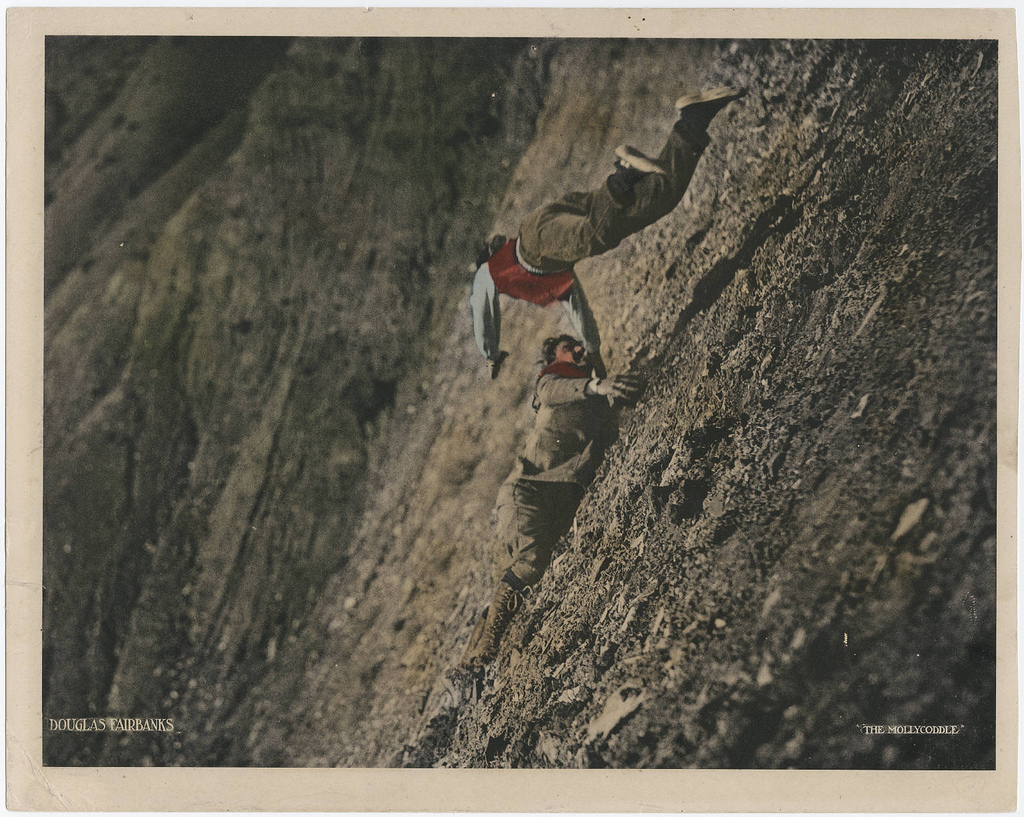
Lobby card showing Fairbanks and Beery brawling.

The Mollycoddle is a 1920 American silent adventure film starring Douglas Fairbanks and Wallace Beery, and directed by Victor Fleming. Beery plays an ice-cold villain brawling with Fairbanks' character all the way down the side of a steep mountain in one sequence. A copy of the film is in the Museum of Modern Art and in other film collections.

== Plot ==
As described in a film magazine, Richard Marshall, nicknamed The Mollycoddle by his friends, is the descendant of hard-hitting, fearless western stock, and although born in Arizona he has been raised since a child in England and acquired English ways.

Upon meeting some Americans who are about to go home in a private yacht, he joins them. Fearing that Richard is a secret service operative, the owner of the yacht, who is smuggling diamonds into the United States, withdraws the invitation. Friends, however, smuggle him aboard and, when the owner discovers him, he is put to work shoveling coal in the boiler room. Off the coast of Texas he jumps ship and swims ashore, is picked up by a fishing net and eventually makes his way to Arizona, where the party is exploring the diamond mines.

Richard discovers the plot to blow up a mountain and hem the party in a little valley. The scheme nearly succeeds, but Richard captures the smuggler in a tall tree, falls through the tree limbs and brawls with him down an extremely steep embankment into a river and over a falls, then drags the half-drowned man to shore. In addition, he of course wins the girl, who turns out to be a detective in service to Uncle Sam.

== Cast (in credits order) ==
- Douglas Fairbanks as Richard Marshall III, IV and V
- Ruth Renick as Virginia Hale
- Wallace Beery as Henry von Holkar
- Paul Burns as Samuel Levinski
- Morris Hughes as Patrick O'Flannigan
- George Stewart as Ole Olsen
- Charles Stevens as Yellow Horse
- Lewis Hippe as First Mate
- Betty Bouton as Mollie Warren
- Adele Farrington as Mrs. Warren
- Albert MacQuarrie as Driver of the Desert Yacht
- Freddie Hawk as Girl Hobo

=== Uncredited cast ===
- Bob Burns as Barfly (uncredited)
- Frank Campeau as Man at Trading Post (uncredited)
- Eagle Eye as Chief (uncredited)
- Bull Montana as Cannery Worker (uncredited)

== Production crew ==
- Cinematography by William C. McGann and Harris Thorpe
- Art Direction by Edward M. Langley
- Second Unit Director Theodore Reed
- Technical effects by Robert Fairbanks
- Supervisor - Douglas Fairbanks

== Production ==
Three weeks were spent north of Winslow, Arizona for filming exteriors.
