= What's a Wife Worth? =

1921 film directed by Christy Cabanne

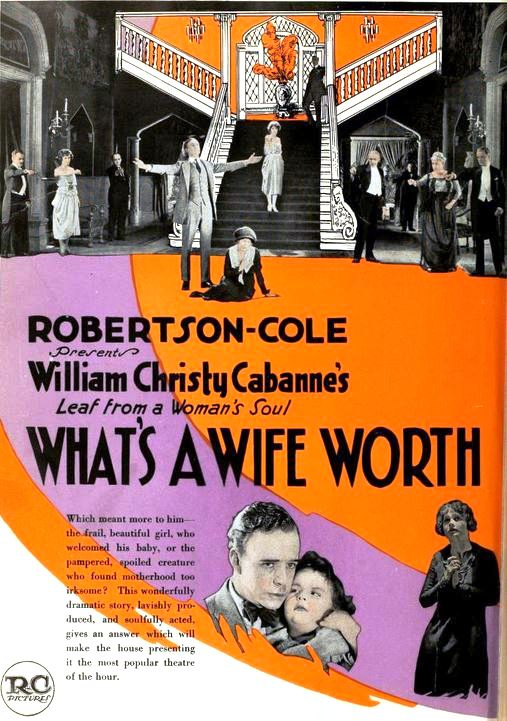
- Advertisement
- Directed by: Christy Cabanne
- Written by: Christy Cabanne
- Starring: Casson Ferguson; Ruth Renick; Cora Drew
- Cinematography: Georges Benoit
- Production company: Robertson-Cole Co.
- Distributed by: R-C Pictures
- Release date: March 27, 1921 (US)
- Running time: 6 reels
- Country: United States
- Language: Silent (English intertitles)

What's a Wife Worth? is a 1921 silent American melodrama film directed by Christy Cabanne and starring Casson Ferguson, Ruth Renick, and Cora Drew. It was released on March 27, 1921.

== Cast ==
- Casson Ferguson as Bruce Morrison
- Ruth Renick as Rose Kendall
- Cora Drew as Her aunt
- Virginia Caldwell as Jane Penfield
- Alec B. Francis as James Morrison
- Howard Gaye as Henry Burton
- Lillian Langdon as Mrs. Penfield
- Maxfield Stanley as Murray Penfield
- Charles Wyngate as Dr. Durant
- Helen Lynch as Girl in the Retrospect
