= The Frontier Trail =

1926 film

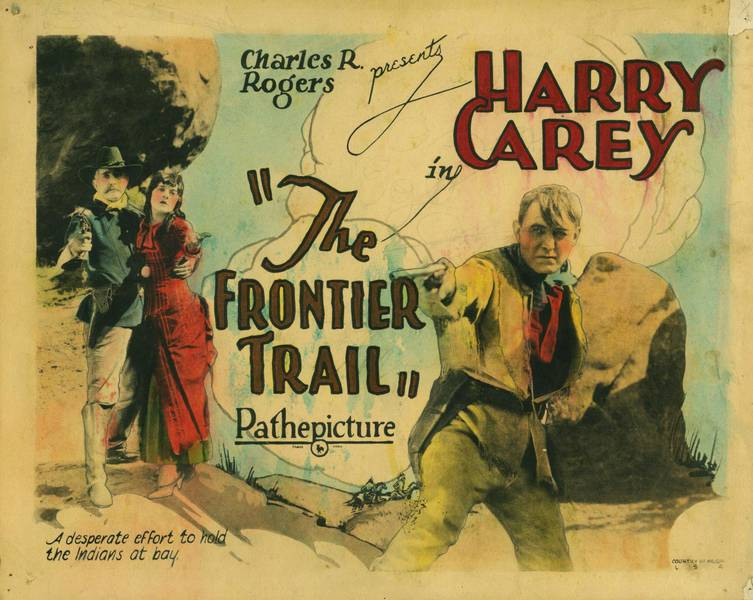
- Directed by: Scott R. Dunlap
- Written by: Basil Dickey; Richard Schayer
- Starring: Harry Carey
- Cinematography: Sol Polito
- Production company: Charles R. Rogers Productions
- Distributed by: Pathé Exchange
- Release date: June 20, 1926
- Running time: 6 reels
- Country: United States
- Language: Silent (English intertitles)

The Frontier Trail is a 1926 American silent Western film directed by Scott R. Dunlap and starring Harry Carey.

== Cast ==
- Harry Carey as Jim Cardigan
- Mabel Julienne Scott as Dolly Mainard
- Ernest Hilliard as Captain Blackwell
- Frank Campeau as Shad Donlin
- Nelson McDowell as Pawnee Jake
- Charles Hill Mailes as Major Mainard (credited as Charles Mailes)
- Harvey Clark as Sergeant O'Shea
- Aggie Herring as Mrs. O'Shea
- Chief John Big Tree as Chief Gray Wolf

== Preservation ==
With no prints of The Frontier Trail located in any film archives, it is a lost film.

== See also ==
- Harry Carey filmography
