= Behold My Wife! (1920 film) =

1920 film by George Melford

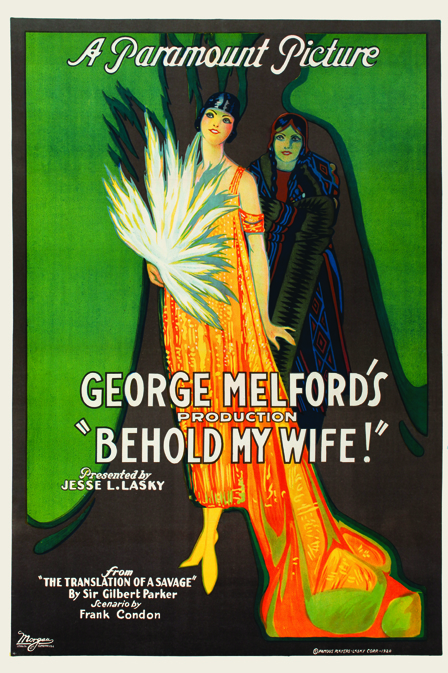
- Lobby poster
- Directed by: George Melford
- Written by: Frank Condon (scenario)
- Based on: The Translation of a Savage by Sir Gilbert Parker
- Produced by: Adolph Zukor; Jesse Lasky
- Starring: Mabel Julienne Scott; Milton Sills
- Cinematography: Paul P. Perry
- Production company: Famous Players–Lasky Corporation
- Distributed by: Paramount Pictures
- Release date: October 10, 1920
- Running time: 70 minutes
- Country: United States
- Language: Silent (English intertitles)

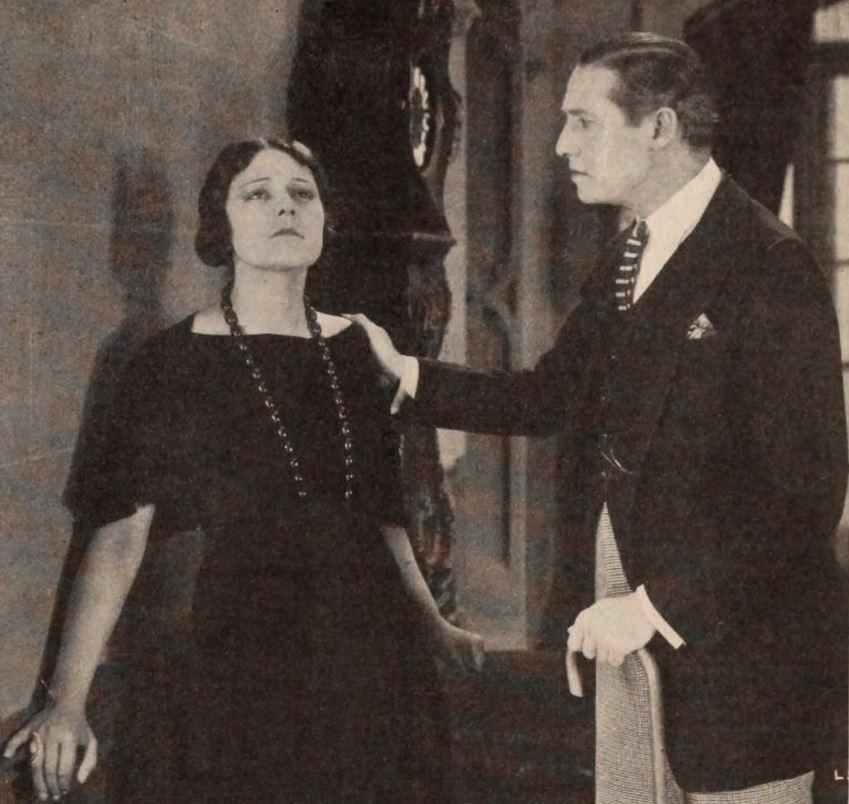
Mabel Julienne Scott and Elliott Dexter

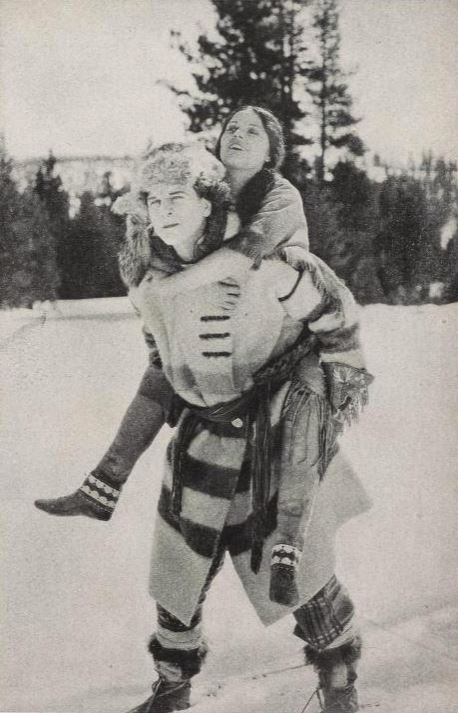
Milton Sills and Mabel Julienne Scott

Behold My Wife! is a lost 1920 American silent drama film directed by George Melford and starring Mabel Julienne Scott and Milton Sills in a filmization of Sir Gilbert Parker's novel, The Translation of a Savage. Famous Players–Lasky produced the film and Paramount Pictures distributed.

In 1934, the story was filmed again by Paramount as Behold My Wife, directed by Mitchell Leisen and starring Sylvia Sidney and Gene Raymond.

== Plot ==
As described in a film magazine, Frank Armour, scion of British aristocracy and of the Hudson's Bay Company, hears from his former sweetheart of her marriage to a rival. In revenge and to ridicule his family, he marries an Indian princess Lali. Sending her to his family home in England, he then plunges into the Canadian wilderness and into a life of dissolution. Through the kindness of the Armour family and especially through the patience and perseverance of Frank's brother Richard, Lili is transformed into a beautiful and charming society woman. Lali's happiness receives a blow when Frank's former sweetheart tells her the reason that he had married her. Lali's loyalty and love for Frank remain steadfast through the years until his redemption and return to the family home to find their boy.

== Cast ==
- Mabel Julienne Scott as Lali, Indian girl
- Milton Sills as Frank Armour
- Winter Hall as General Armour
- Elliott Dexter as Richard Armour
- Helen Dunbar as Mrs. Armour
- Ann Forrest as Marion Armour
- Maude Wayne as Julia Haldwell
- Fred Huntley as Chief Eye-of-the-Moon (credited as Fred Huntly)
- Frank Butler as Captain Vidal (credited as F.R. Butler)
- Templar Powell as Lord Haldwell (credited as F. Templer-Powell)
- Mark Fenton as Gordon
- Jane Wolfe as Mrs. McKenzie
