= Ruth Renick =

American actress (1893–1984)

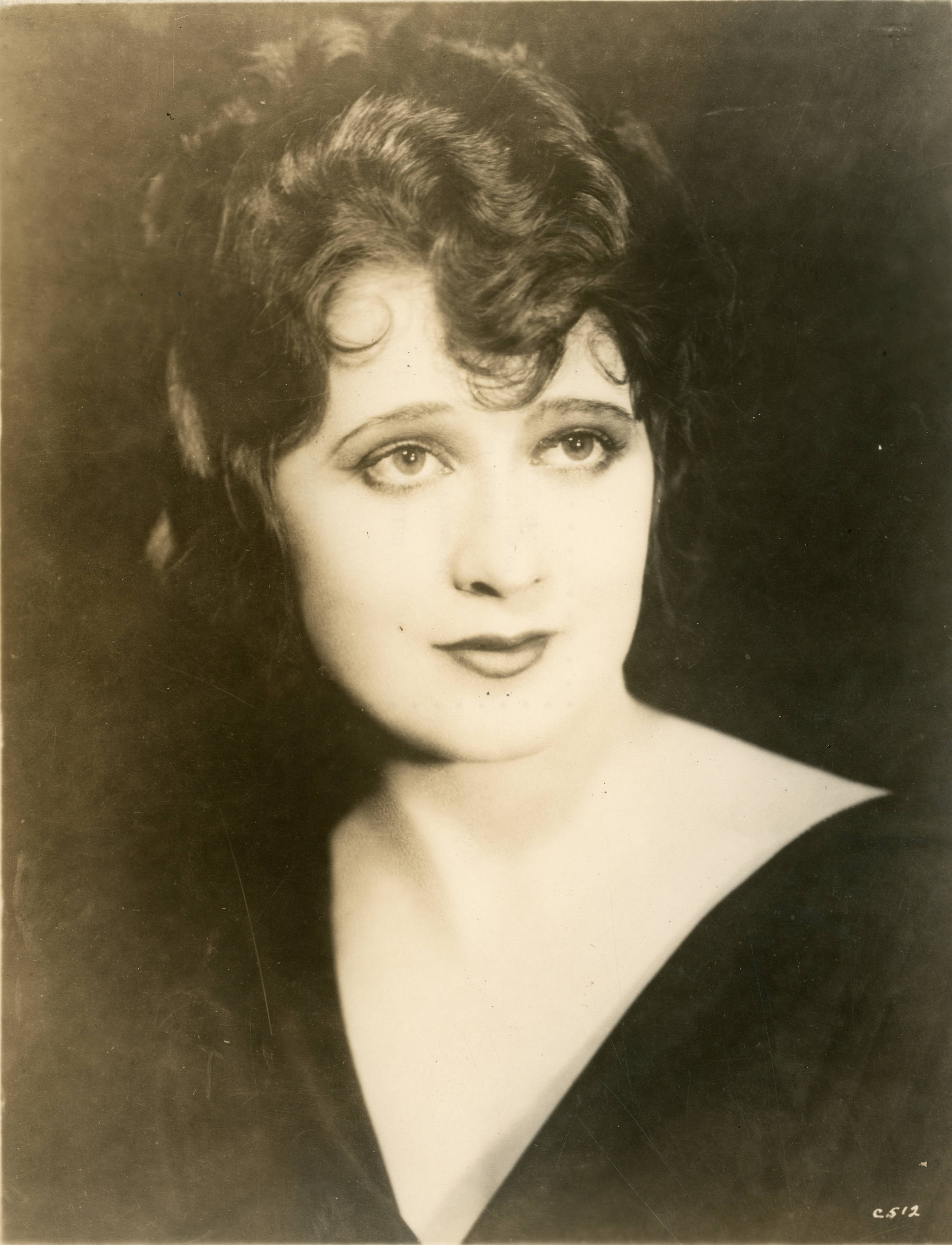
- Renick in 1923
- Born: Ruth Griffin; September 13, 1893; Colorado, Texas, U.S.
- Died: May 7, 1984 (aged 90); Hollywood, California, U.S.
- Occupation: Actress
- Years active: 1919–1931

Ruth Renick (born Ruth Griffin; September 23, 1893 - May 7, 1984) was an American actress on stage and in films. She made her debut in film in 1919, in a silent film. Her career spanned the shift to "talkies", and Renick had her last role in a Western film in 1932. She had started acting in theatre in high school in Phoenix, Arizona. Later she moved to California where she had more stage roles, and ultimately expanded her career in film.

== Early years ==
Born Ruth Griffin in 1893 in Colorado, Texas, she was the daughter of R. H. Griffin and his wife. Her family moved to Phoenix, Arizona when she was young. While Griffin was a high school student there, she joined the Maitland Davis stock theater company, working with the troupe for four months.

== Career ==
In 1916, Renick joined the Redmond stock company, debuting on June 1 in San Jose, California in When Knighthood Was in Flower. She later acted with the Wilkes stock company in Seattle, Washington, where she was featured in ingenue roles. After some time working in films, she went to the Fulton Theater in Oakland, California to be the leading lady in its productions.

In 1919 Renick signed with the Jesse D. Hampton company to work in films. She made her film debut in Hawthorne of the U.S.A. (1919). Soon after that, she was signed by Douglas Fairbanks, who had a production company, and appeared with him in The Mollycoddle (1920).

== Controversy over speaking engagement at a church ==
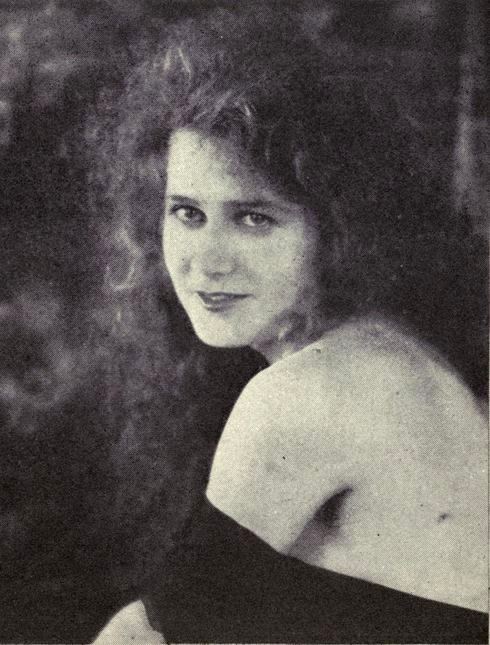
Ruth Renick in 1921

As a well-known star, Renick was invited to public speaking engagements. In 1928 she was scheduled to speak to the Men's Club of First Presbyterian Church in Berkeley, California about the film The King of Kings (1928). Also invited to that meeting was the dean of San Francisco Theological Seminary, who was to talk about laymen and the church. Because the elders raised objections, both speakers were told the morning of the meeting that it had been cancelled. The church's pastor said that its governing body decided "not to have any member of the organized theatrical profession" speak to the church's members. Given Renick's status as a popular starring actress, the cancellation received front-page coverage in The San Francisco Examiner and the Oakland Tribune, with additional reporting inside. The First Unitarian Church of Oakland quickly invited Renick to speak to their congregation the following week, but she declined after receiving a letter with a death threat. About six weeks later, Renick did speak to a class at the First Congregational Church of San Francisco, discussing relationships between the church and the theatre.

== Personal life ==
In her mid-20s, Renick married Wellington N. Bellford, who was arrested shortly afterward in January 1924 in Oakland for impersonating an Army officer. At the time, Bellford denied that he and Renick were married, while she said, "But we were married". Asked for details about the wedding, Renick replied, "I cannot say when or where, as my husband appears to have denied it." While out on bail, Bellford also acknowledged that he had claimed to have been a writer of short stories and screenplays in Los Angeles. The publicity was embarrassing for Renick, but she proceeded with her performances at the theatre in Oakland.

After receiving a telegram from her about the marriage, her sister and brother-in-law had investigated the so-called major. They reported Bellford's impersonation to the police after finding no marriage license had been issued for the couple in Santa Clara County or in San Jose, where Renick had said they had wed. The impersonation charge against Bellford was finally dismissed in 1928, when he was described as a 'love pirate'. Authorities decided that he had used a mock wedding ceremony to trick Renick. Although he disappeared at the time, he was later prosecuted for embezzlement in Detroit, Michigan.

== Death ==
On May 7, 1984, Renick died in Hollywood, California, at age 90.

== Partial filmography ==
- Hawthorne of the U.S.A. (1919)
- The White Dove (1920)
- The Mollycoddle (1920)
- Conrad in Quest of His Youth (1920)
- The Parish Priest (1920)
- She Couldn't Help It (1920)
- The Jucklins (1921)
- What's a Wife Worth? (1921)
- The Witching Hour (1921)
- Children of the Night (1921)
- The Golden Snare (1921)
- Bar Nothin' (1921)
- The Men of Zanzibar (1922)
- Rags to Riches (1922)
- Roughshod (1922)
- The Fire Bride (1922)
- Conductor 1492 (1924)
- Ask Dad (1929)
- Possessed (1931)
- 45 Calibre Echo (1932)
- Cannonball Express (1932)
