= Laird & Lee =

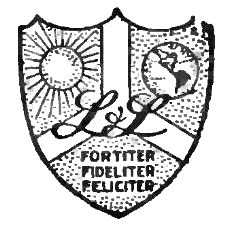
Laird and Lee Inc. Publishers Logo

Laird & Lee was a Chicago-based book publisher known for its dime novel fiction and dictionaries. Its paperbacks were primarily distributed at railroads and newsstands instead of bookstores. The firm was founded in 1883 by Frederick C. Laird (born c. 1863) and William Henry Lee (c. 1863–1913). Lee bought out Laird in 1894. Their publications included the Pinkerton Detective Series (1887–1901).

After Lee died in 1913 without heirs to his $200,000 fortune, the firm eventually became a division of Laidlaw Brothers, which was a division of Albert Whitman & Company.

Some mystery surrounded Lee's background, and upon his death it was reported that he was a light-skinned black, which if true would have made him one of the first black publishers in the United States.

Authors published by Laird & Lee include Opie Read and Ignatius L. Donnelly.
