= Mabel Julienne Scott =

American actress

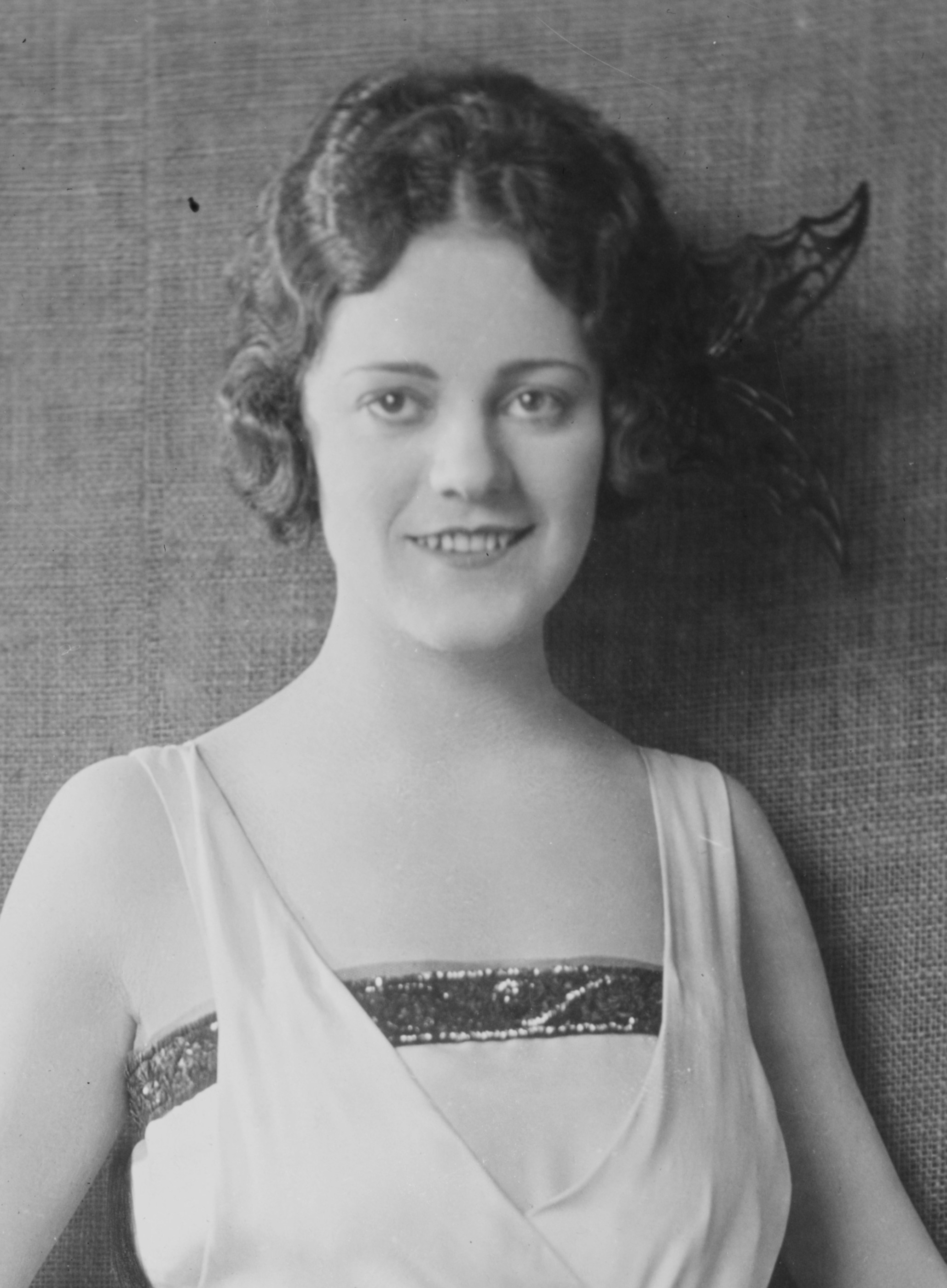
- Born: November 2, 1892; Minneapolis, Minnesota, U.S.
- Died: October 1, 1976 (aged 83); Los Angeles, California, U.S.
- Occupation: Actress

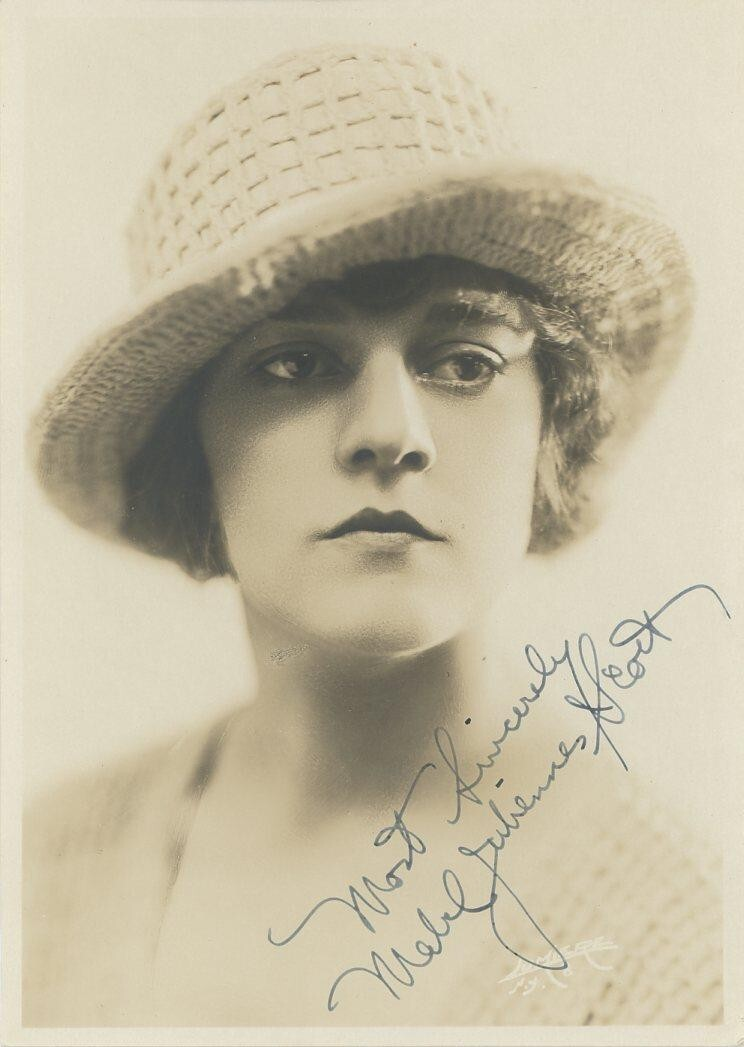
Scott (1921)

Mabel Julienne Scott (November 2, 1892 – October 1, 1976) was an American stage and silent movie actress.

== Biography ==
Scott was born in Minneapolis, Minnesota, to Joseph and Martie Scott, of French and Norwegian heritage. A graduate of Northwestern Conservatory in Minneapolis, she also attended Stanley Girls' College. She came to New York City at the age of 17. When she failed to land the job she wanted, Scott played for a time with a stock company in Omaha, Nebraska. Scott made her Broadway (Manhattan) stage debut in The Barrier by Rex Beach.

Scott's feature film debut came in The Lash of Destiny (1916).

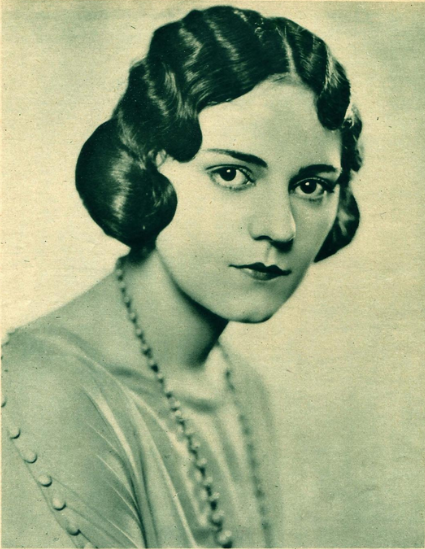
Mabel Julienne Scott (1923)

In 1926, she played the role of the mother in The Lullaby, performed at the Pasadena Playhouse. One critic commented that Scott was uniquely suited to play the part for which she was cast. Other theatrical appearances of note are roles in Painted Faces, with comedian Joe E. Brown and The Copperhead, playing opposite Lionel Barrymore. In Behold My Wife (1920) she played the leading feminine role as Lali, an American Indian maiden. The film was produced by Famous Players. She shared an apartment in Hollywood for a time with her brother, William Scott, who was also an actor. Scott was paired with Roscoe Arbuckle in the Paramount Pictures release, The Round Up (1920). She was contracted to George Medford Productions but made motion pictures for both Famous Players and Goldwyn Pictures.

Scott preferred acting in motion pictures to her work on the stage. She believed youth was a necessity to succeed in films. As the camera is more stringent than the eye, youth is not as essential in theater. Scott told an interviewer that the majority of successful stage actresses are middle-age and have a number of years of experience. An outdoor enthusiast, Scott was a frequent visitor to the Los Angeles, California Gun Club. She purchased a Thoroughbred sport model of the Lexington (automobile) in 1920. She married a prominent New York City physician. Mabel Julienne Scott died in Los Angeles in 1976.

== Partial filmography ==
- The Barrier (1917)
- Ashes of Love (1918)
- Sacred Silence (1919)
- The Sea Wolf (1920)
- The Round-Up (1920)
- Behold My Wife! (1920)
- The Concert (1921)
- The Jucklins (1921)
- No Woman Knows (1921)
- Don't Neglect Your Wife (1921)
- The Power of a Lie (1922)
- The Abysmal Brute (1923)
- Times Have Changed (1923)
- So This Is Marriage (1924)
- Steele of the Royal Mounted (1925)
- Seven Days (1925)
- His Jazz Bride (1926)
- The Frontier Trail (1926)
- Stranded in Paris (1926)
- A Woman's Heart (1926)
- Wallflowers (1928)
- The Dream Melody (1929)
- Painted Faces (1929)
