= A Million Bid =

A Million Bid may refer to:

- A Million Bid (1914 film)
- A Million Bid (1927 film)
