= Three Faces East =

Three Faces East may refer to:

- Three Faces East (1926 film), a silent film directed by Rupert Julian
- Three Faces East (1930 film), a talking picture directed by Roy Del Ruth
