= The Taming of the West =

The Taming of the West may refer to:

- The Taming of the West (1925 film), 1925 silent film western directed by Arthur Rosson
- The Taming of the West (1939 film), 1939 American western film directed by Norman Deming
