= Two Kinds of Women =

Two Kinds of Women may refer to:

- Two Kinds of Women (1922 film), a lost American silent western film
- Two Kinds of Women (1932 film), an American pre-Code drama film
