= Her Choice =

Her Choice may refer to:

- Her Choice (1912 film), an American silent film
- Her Choice (1915 film), an American silent comedy film
