= Lovetime =

1921 silent film

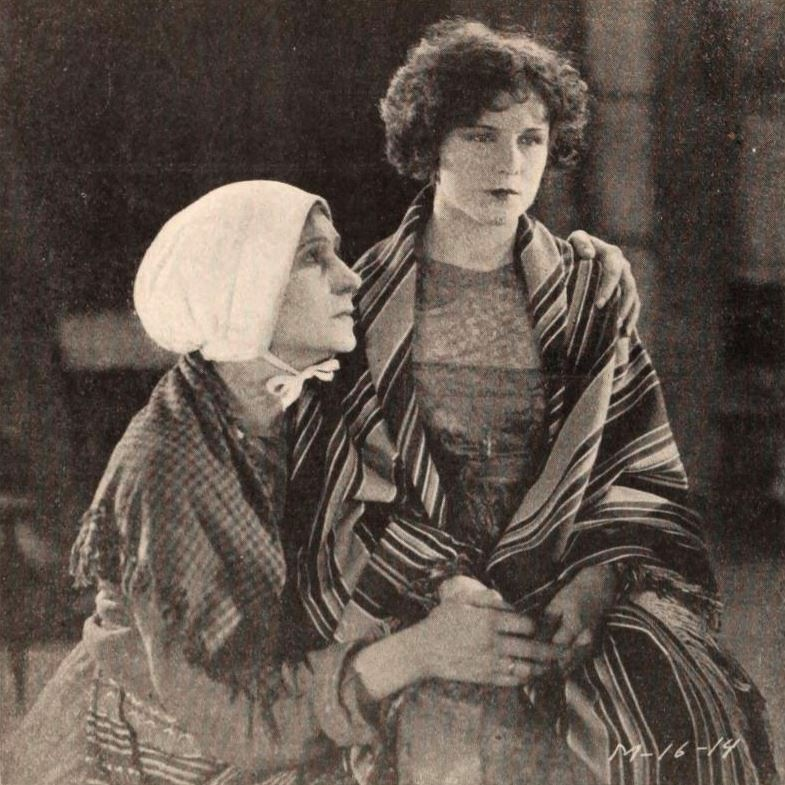
- Directed by: Howard M. Mitchell
- Written by: Hubert La Due; Dorothy Yost
- Produced by: William Fox
- Starring: Shirley Mason; Raymond McKee; Edwin B. Tilton
- Cinematography: Glen MacWilliams
- Production company: Fox Film
- Distributed by: Fox Film
- Release date: July 24, 1921
- Running time: 50 minutes
- Country: United States
- Languages: Silent; English intertitles

Lovetime is a 1921 American silent drama film directed by Howard M. Mitchell and starring Shirley Mason, Raymond McKee and Edwin B. Tilton.

== Cast ==
- Shirley Mason as Marie Gautier
- Raymond McKee as Arthur de Sivry, Marquis of Savoy/ André Broque
- Frances Hatton as Margaret, Marie's mother
- Edwin B. Tilton as Lanstalot, Marie's father
- Mathilde Brundage as Marchioness de Sivry
- Clarence Wilson as Count de Baudine
- Harold Goodwin as Pierre Lavone
- Charles Smiley as Father Lesurges
- Correan Kirkham as Yvonne de Fourgères

== Bibliography ==
- Solomon, Aubrey. The Fox Film Corporation, 1915-1935: A History and Filmography. McFarland, 2011.
