= Romance of a Rogue =

1928 film

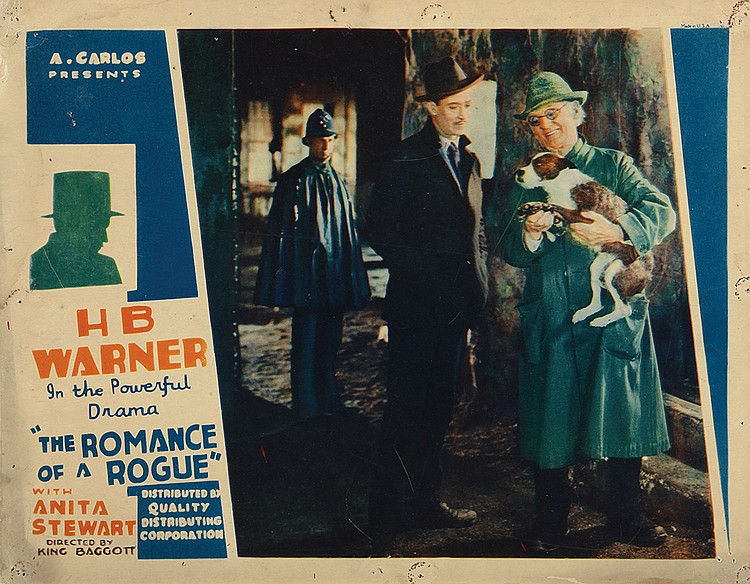
- Lobby card
- Directed by: King Baggot
- Written by: Adrian Johnson; Tom Miranda
- Based on: The Romance of a Rogue by Ruby M. Ayres
- Starring: H.B. Warner; Anita Stewart; Charles K. Gerrard
- Cinematography: Faxon M. Dean; Chandler House
- Edited by: William Holmes
- Production company: Carlos Productions
- Distributed by: Quality Distributing Corporation
- Release date: October 1, 1928
- Running time: 6 reels
- Country: United States
- Language: Silent (English intertitles)

Romance of a Rogue is a 1928 American silent drama film directed by King Baggot and starring H.B. Warner, Anita Stewart, and Charles K. Gerrard. It is based on the 1923 novel by the British writer Ruby M. Ayres.

== Cast ==
- H.B. Warner as Bruce Lowry
- Anita Stewart as Charmain
- Alfred Fisher as John Cristopher
- Charles K. Gerrard as Leonard Hardingham
- Fred Esmelton
- Billy Franey

== Bibliography ==
- Donald W. McCaffrey & Christopher P. Jacobs. Guide to the Silent Years of American Cinema. Greenwood Publishing, 1999. ISBN 0-313-30345-2
