= In Old Kentucky (1919 film) =

1919 film by Marshall Neilan

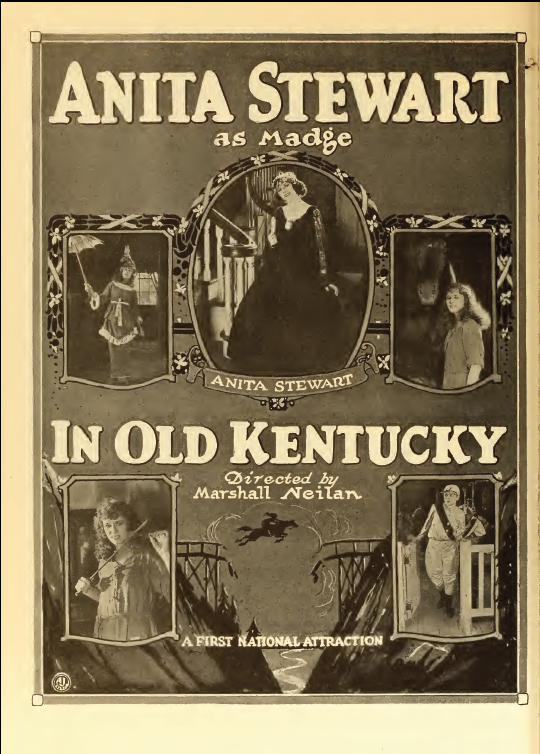
- Advertisement
- Directed by: Marshall Neilan
- Written by: Thomas J. Geraghty (scenario)
- Based on: In Old Kentucky by Charles T. Dazey
- Produced by: Louis B. Mayer; Anita Stewart
- Starring: Anita Stewart
- Cinematography: Tony Gaudio
- Distributed by: First National
- Release date: December 15, 1919
- Running time: 70 minutes; 7 reels
- Country: United States
- Language: Silent (English intertitles)

In Old Kentucky is a 1919 American silent drama film produced by Louis B. Mayer and distributed through First National Attractions, later First National Pictures. The picture was directed by Marshall Neilan and starred Anita Stewart. It was based on the play In Old Kentucky by Charles T. Dazey.

Neilan and Mayer worked often together at this time, but after Mayer became head of MGM in 1924, the two had a falling-out which revealed each man disliking the other fiercely. Neilan was vocal about his dislike of Mayer, which damaged his Hollywood career. Later, not finding work at the major studios, Neilan ended his career directing B movies.

Later, as head of MGM, Mayer had the film remade in 1927. In 1935, Will Rogers made a sound version at Fox.

MGM has preserved the film.

== Cast ==
- Anita Stewart as Madge Brierly
- Mahlon Hamilton as Frank Layson
- Edward Coxen as Joe Lorey
- Charles Arling as Horace Holten
- Edward Connelly as Col. Sandusky Doolittle
- Adele Farrington as Aunt Aleathea
- Marcia Manon as Barbara Holten
- Frank Duffy as Eddie Lennhardt
- John Currie as Uncle Neb
