= The Winning Girl =

1919 film

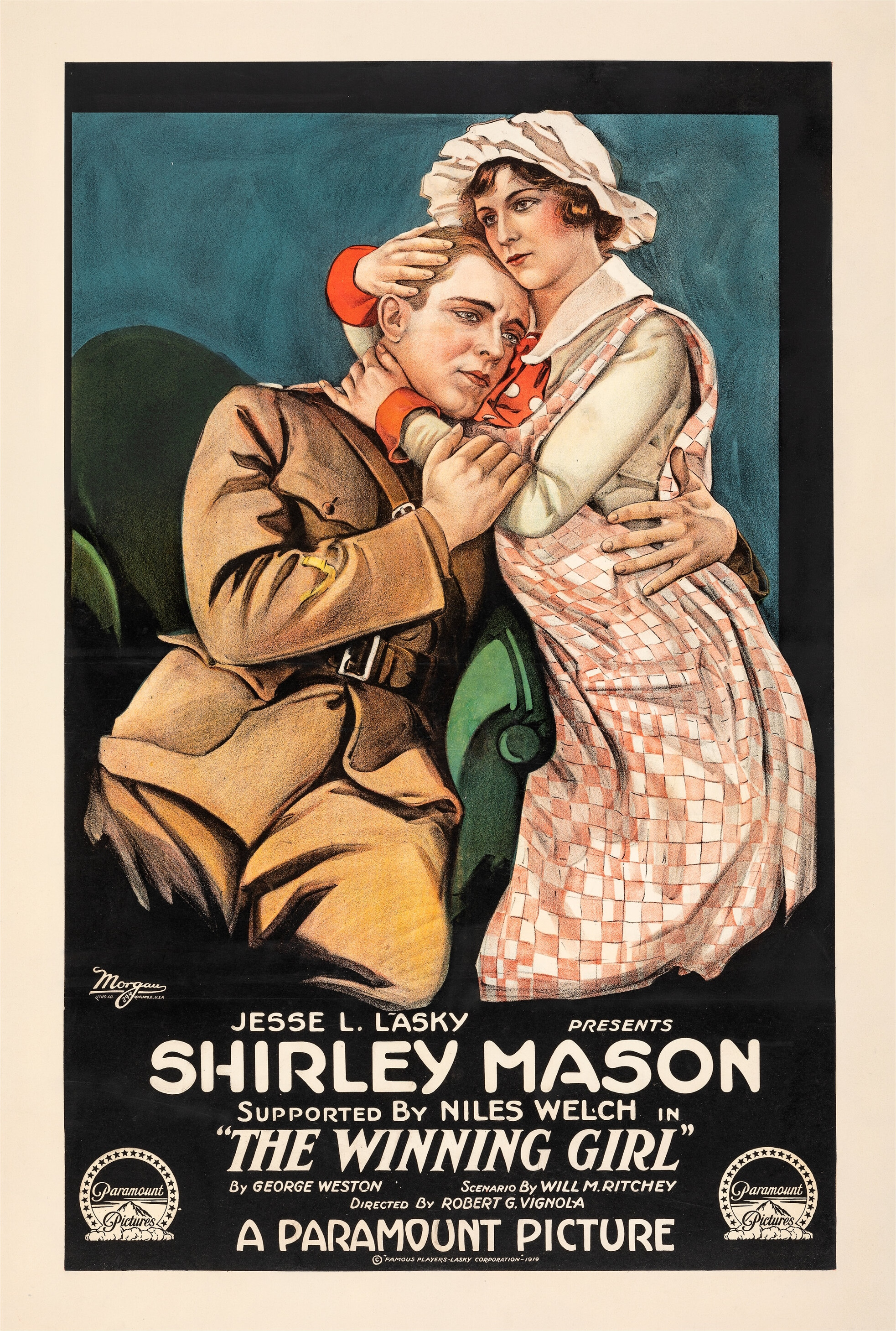
- Theatrical release poster
- Directed by: Robert G. Vignola
- Written by: Will M. Ritchey
- Based on: Jem of the Old Rock by George Weston from The Saturday Evening Post, Oct. 1918
- Produced by: Adolph Zukor; Jesse Lasky
- Cinematography: Charles Schoenbaum
- Distributed by: Famous Players–Lasky; Paramount Pictures
- Release date: February 23, 1919
- Running time: 5 reels
- Country: USA
- Language: Silent (English intertitles)

The Winning Girl is a lost 1919 silent film comedy drama directed by Robert G. Vignola and starring Shirley Mason.

== Cast ==
- Shirley Mason - Jemmy Milligan
- Theodore Roberts - Major Milligan
- Harold Goodwin - Jack Milligan
- Lincoln Stedman - Percy Milligan (*billed Lincoln Steadman)
- Clara Horton - Vivian Milligan
- Jean Calhoun - Gwendolyn Milligan
- Edythe Chapman - 2nd Mrs. Milligan
- Niles Welch - Stanley Templeton
- Helen Dunbar - Mrs. Templeton
- Jose Melville - Fanny Milligan
