= British Intelligence (film) =

1940 film by Terry O. Morse

- Theatrical poster
- Directed by: Terry O. Morse
- Screenplay by: Lee Katz
- Based on: Three Faces East; 1918 play by Anthony Paul Kelly
- Produced by: Bryan Foy (uncredited)
- Starring: Boris Karloff; Margaret Lindsay
- Cinematography: Sid Hickox
- Edited by: Thomas Pratt
- Music by: H. Roemheld
- Production company: Warner Bros. Pictures
- Distributed by: Warner Bros. Pictures
- Release date: January 29, 1940
- Running time: 60 minutes
- Country: United States
- Language: English

British Intelligence is a 1940 American spy film set in World War I. It was directed by Terry O. Morse and stars Boris Karloff and Margaret Lindsay. The film, also known as Enemy Agent, was released in the United States in January 1940. (Note: The working title of this film was "Secret Enemy".) The Warner Bros. B picture was based on a 1918 play Three Faces East written by Anthony Paul Kelly and produced on the stage by George M. Cohan. Two film adaptations of Three Faces East in 1926 and 1930 preceded British Intelligence.

== Plot ==
During World War I, Franz Strendler, a master German spy has cost the British dearly. In desperation, they send for their best agent, currently undercover in Germany. Pilot Frank Bennett is sent to pick him up, but the Germans are forewarned and Bennett is shot down. Luckily, he survives and is rescued by friendly soldiers. While recovering in a hospital, Bennett is tended by a pretty nurse, Helene Von Lorbeer. He tells her he loves her, but she informs him she is leaving, and they will not see each other again. However, after Bennett falls asleep, she kisses him on the cheek.

Von Lorbeer turns out to be a spy herself. She is recalled to Germany to receive a high honor sent personally by the Kaiser and to undertake a new mission. Posing as a refugee named Frances Hawtrey, she infiltrates the London household of Arthur Bennett, a cabinet minister, and, coincidentally, Frank's father. She takes her orders from Valdar, the butler. Valdar later secretly reports to Colonel Yeats, the head of British Intelligence.

When Bennett's secretary, also a German spy, taps out a secret message in code on her typewriter, Yeats is present and recognizes it. Since only Hawtrey is also in the office at the time, he sets a trap for her. A captured spy named Kurz seemingly escapes from the British and flees to Hawtrey's bedroom. She hides him in her closet, but then betrays him when Yeats and his men show up. Afterwards, she tells Valdar that she knew "Kurz" was an imposter.

Frank Bennett unexpectedly shows up, his squadron and others having been recalled to London for some reason. He is surprised to find his former nurse there and under a different name. Hawtrey is forced to reveal that she is loyal to the British. However, Valdar overhears their conversation.

That night, the British cabinet meets in Bennett's home. It is the moment Valdar has been waiting for. He forces Hawtrey at gunpoint down in the cellar, where he has set a bomb to blow the house up under cover of a Zeppelin bombing raid. Hawtrey tells Valdar that she had no choice but to make up a story to allay Frank's suspicions. Convinced when she shows him the award she was given, Valdar finally reveals that he is Strendler.

Fortunately, Valdar has been under surveillance. Yeats and his men rush to the cellar door. When Valdar escapes through the coal chute, Hawtrey unlocks the door and informs Yeats about the bomb, revealing that she is a double agent. Valdar rushes to his hideout to transmit the stolen British plans for the spring offensive, pursued by the British, but, ironically, a Zeppelin bombs the location and kills him and his confederates before he can send his information.

== Cast ==
- Boris Karloff as Valdar
- Margaret Lindsay as Helene Von Lorbeer
- Bruce Lester as Frank Bennett
- Leonard Mudie as James Yeats
- Holmes Herbert as Arthur Bennett
- Austin Fairman as George Bennett
- William Bailey as British Intelligence agent (uncredited)
- Glen Cavender as Under Officer Pfalz (uncredited)
- Carlos De Valdez as Von Ritter (uncredited)
- Clarence Derwent as Milkman (uncredited)
- Arno Frey as German junior officer (uncredited)
- Lawrence Grant as Brigadier General (uncredited)
- Carl Harbaugh as German soldier (uncredited)
- Winifred Harris as Mrs. Maude Bennett (uncredited)
- Leyland Hodgson as Lord Sudbury (uncredited)
- Stuart Holmes as Luchow, German soldier (uncredited)
- Morton Lowry as Lt. Borden (uncredited)
- Lester Matthews as Henry Thompson (uncredited)
- Frank Mayo as Brixton, intelligence agent (uncredited)
- Paul Panzer as Peasant (uncredited)
- Ferdinand Schumann-Heink as German officer (uncredited)
- Hans Schumm as German senior officer (uncredited)
- Evan Thomas as Maj. Andrews (uncredited)
- Maris Wrixon as Dorothy Bennett (uncredited)

== Production ==
Warner Bros. Pictures began principal photography on British Intelligence in mid-March 1939. Morse's remake of Three Faces East "... is clearly one of those cheap and fast quickies the studios - in this instance, Warner - ground out at the onset of war, as the sheerest propaganda." Aerial sequences from the 1930 film The Dawn Patrol were used in the film.

== Reception ==
British Intelligence was typical of prewar American propaganda films, similar to other Warner Bros. productions. Some later reviewers saw it as a clumsy attempt to portray German aggression in Europe at the start of World War II. "As a balm to 1940 audiences, the film includes an early comedy scene in which German military protocol is upset by a clumsy corporal (Willy Kaufman) who bears a startling resemblance to a certain Nazi dictator." Other reviewers have been more positive. The Radio Times notes that "this is an intriguing thriller... the wilful obscurity of the storyline is part of its appeal, along with Karloff's sinister geniality."

== See also ==
- List of American films of 1940
- Boris Karloff filmography
