= Jean Calhoun =

American actress (1891–1958)

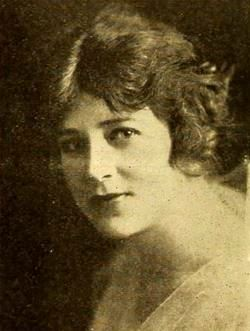
- Calhoun in 1919
- Born: Mary Alice Crawford; January 4, 1891; Georgia, U.S.
- Died: August 25, 1958 (aged 67); Los Angeles, California, U.S.
- Occupation: Actress
- Years active: 1918–1950

Jean Calhoun (April 1, 1891 – August 25, 1958) was an American film actress whose career was most prolific during the silent film era. She was a descendant of Martin Jenkins Crawford (March 17, 1820 – July 23, 1883), an antebellum U.S. Representative and a representative to the Provisional Confederate Congress during the American Civil War from the state of Georgia.

== Filmography ==
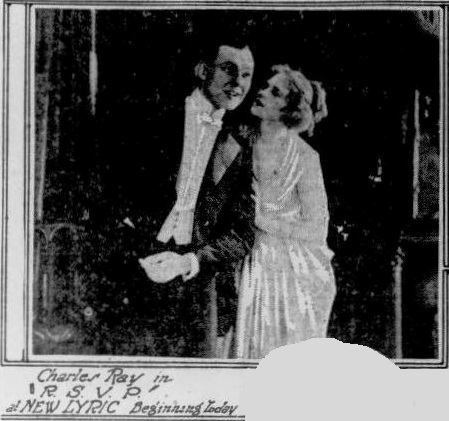
With Charles Ray in R.S.V.P.

- The Man Who Woke Up (1918)
- High Tide (1918)
- The Winning Girl (1919)
- The Feud (1919)
- Thieves (1919)
- When a Man Loves (1919)
- The False Code (1919)
- The Splendid Sin (1919)
- The Exquisite Thief (1919)
- Alias Mike Moran (1919)
- Officer 666 (1920)
- His Own Law (1920)
- The Phantom Melody (1920)
- R.S.V.P. (1921)
- Three Sevens (1921)
- The Cub Reporter (1922)
- The Glory of Clementina (1922)
- Two Kinds of Women (1922)
- The Gangster (1947) Minor Role (uncredited)
- Caged (1950) Inmate (uncredited)
