= Edwin B. Tilton =

American actor

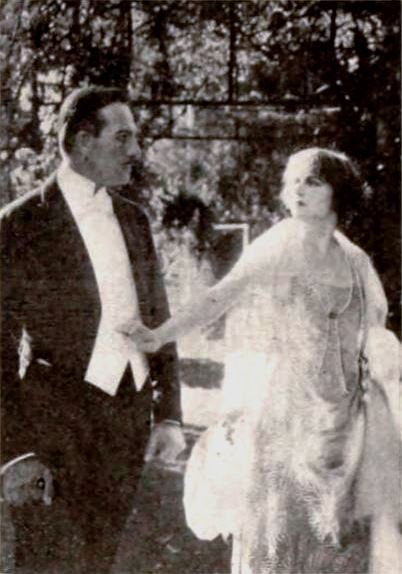
- Still with Tilton and Peggy Hyland in Black Shadows (1920)
- Born: September 15, 1859; Chicago, Illinois, U.S.
- Died: January 16, 1926 (aged 66); Los Angeles, California, U.S.
- Occupation: Actor
- Years active: 1912-1925
- Spouse: Irene Gaunt

Edwin B. Tilton (September 15, 1859 – January 16, 1926) was an American male actor of the silent era.

Tilton was born in Chicago, Illinois

He appeared in more than 60 films between 1912 and 1925.

Tilton was married to Irene Gaunt. He died on January 16, 1926, at his home in Los Angeles.

== Selected filmography ==
- Cupid's Round Up (1918)
- Under the Yoke (1918)
- Riddle Gawne (1918)
- The Shuttle (1918)
- A Midnight Romance (1919)
- The Lincoln Highwayman (1919)
- Her Kingdom of Dreams (1919)
- The Web of Chance (1919)
- Faith (1920)
- Just Pals (1920)
- Curtain (1920)
- The Iron Heart (1920)
- Two Moons (1920)
- Love's Harvest (1920)
- The Mother Heart (1921)
- What Love Will Do (1921)
- Bucking the Line (1921)
- Bare Knuckles (1921)
- Lovetime (1921)
- The Lamplighter (1921)
- Man Under Cover (1922)
- The Cub Reporter (1922)
- Thundergate (1923)
- The Midnight Express (1924)
- The Lone Chance (1924)
- Why Get Married? (1924)
- Racing for Life (1924)
- The House of Youth (1924)
- The Taming of the West (1925)
