= Rustling for Cupid =

1926 film

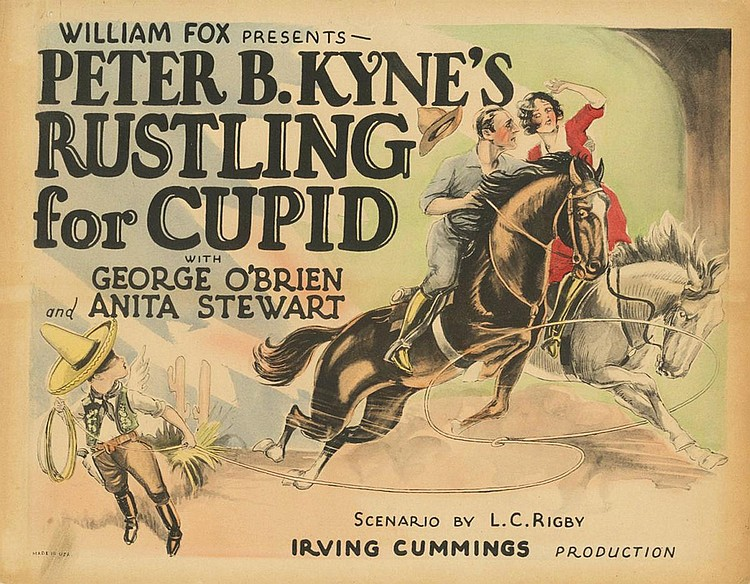
- Directed by: Irving Cummings
- Written by: Peter B. Kyne (story); Gordon Rigby
- Produced by: William Fox
- Starring: George O'Brien; Anita Stewart; Russell Simpson
- Cinematography: Conrad Wells
- Production company: Fox Film
- Distributed by: Fox Film
- Release date: April 11, 1926 (U.S.)
- Running time: 50 min.
- Country: United States
- Language: Silent (English intertitles)

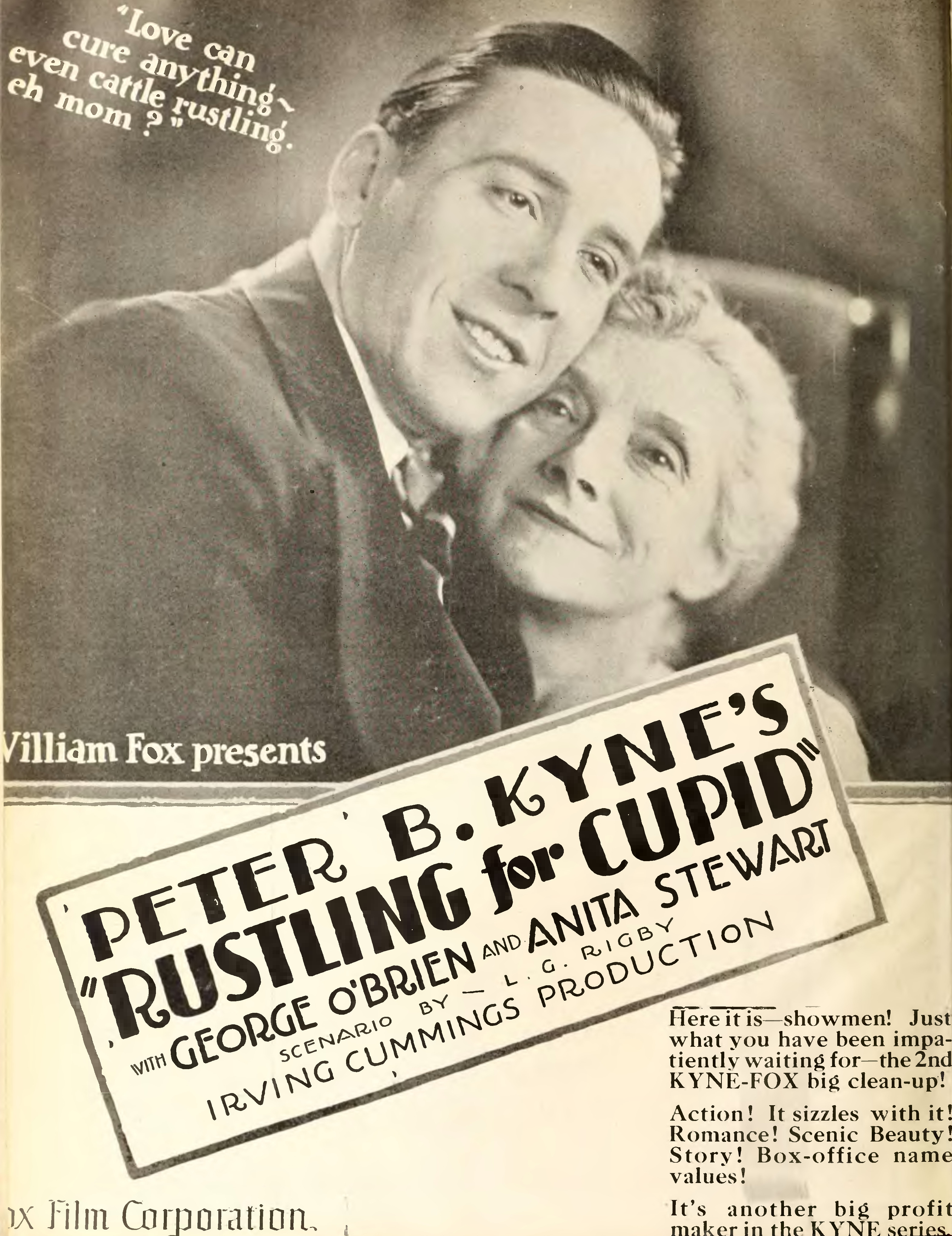
Rustling for Cupid ad in Motion Picture News, 1926

Rustling for Cupid is a 1926 American silent Western film directed by Irving Cummings and starring George O'Brien, Anita Stewart, and Russell Simpson.

== Plot ==
Upon returning to his father's ranch from college, Bradley Blatchford encounters Sybil Hamilton, who is arriving in the ranch town to work as a schoolteacher. Soon after, Bradley's father becomes suspected of cattle rustling, but he vehemently denies the accusation. As Bradley and Sybil's relationship blossoms, Bradley catches a rustler in the act, only to discover that it is his own father. His father explains that he is grappling with an uncontrollable hereditary predisposition. Witnessing the scene, some acquaintances rustle cattle from Blatchford's ranch, branding it with Sybil's mark, and falsely accusing her of rustling and harboring a concealed past. Sybil reveals that her brother brought shame to the family, but upon learning the truth, George is forgiven and reconciled with her.

== Cast ==
- George O'Brien as Bradley Blatchford
- Anita Stewart as Sybil Hamilton
- Russell Simpson as Hank Blatchford
- Edith Yorke as Mrs. Blatchford
- Herbert Prior as Tom Martin
- Frank McGlynn Jr. as Dave Martin
- Sid Jordan as Jack Mason

== Bibliography ==
- Langman, Larry. A Guide to Silent Westerns. Greenwood Publishing Group, 1992.
