= Her Kingdom of Dreams =

1919 film by Marshall Neilan

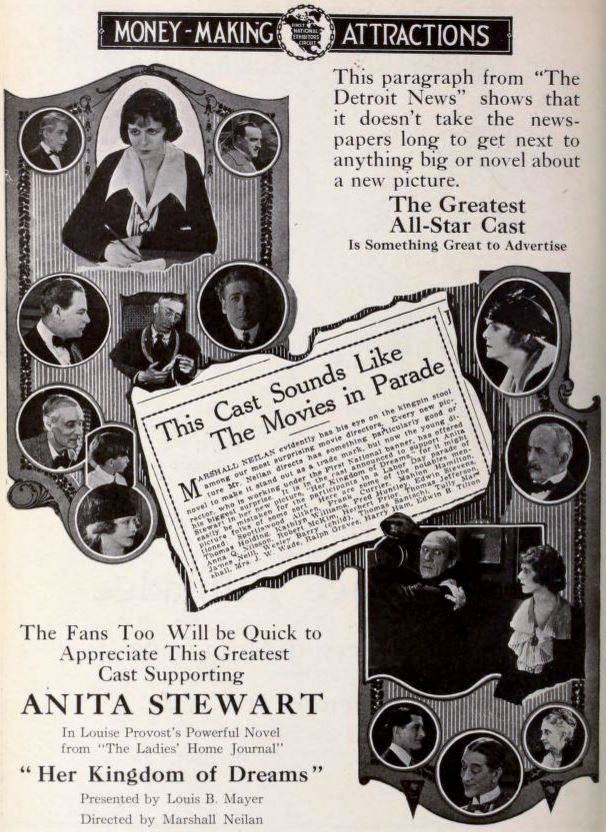
- Directed by: Marshall Neilan
- Written by: Agnes Louise Provost
- Produced by: Louis B. Mayer; Anita Stewart
- Starring: Anita Stewart; Spottiswoode Aitken; Frank Currier
- Cinematography: Dal Clawson
- Edited by: William Shea
- Production companies: Anita Stewart Productions; Louis B. Mayer Productions
- Distributed by: First National Pictures
- Release date: September 21, 1919
- Running time: 70 minutes
- Country: United States
- Language: Silent (English intertitles)

Her Kingdom of Dreams is a 1919 American silent drama film directed by Marshall Neilan and starring Anita Stewart, Spottiswoode Aitken, and Frank Currier.

== Cast ==
- Anita Stewart as Judith Rutledge
- Spottiswoode Aitken as David Rutledge
- Frank Currier as James Warren
- Mahlon Hamilton as Fred Warren
- Thomas Holding as Jim Warren
- Kathlyn Williams as Penelope Warren
- Fred Huntley as Parker
- Edwin Stevens as J. Wellington Yarnell
- Anna Q. Nilsson as Carlotta Stanmore
- Robert McKim as Charlie Stanmore
- Herbert Prior as John Hastings
- Thomas Jefferson as Bassett
- James Neill as Purdon
- Wesley Barry as Office Boy
- Tom Santschi as Tom Langley
- Tully Marshall as Langley
- Mrs. J.W. Wade as Mrs. Langley
- Ralph Graves as Billy Dayne
- Harry Ham as John Brown
- Edwin B. Tilton as The Minister

== Bibliography ==
- Donald W. McCaffrey & Christopher P. Jacobs. Guide to the Silent Years of American Cinema. Greenwood Publishing, 1999. ISBN 0-313-30345-2
