= Thundergate =

1923 film directed by Joseph De Grasse

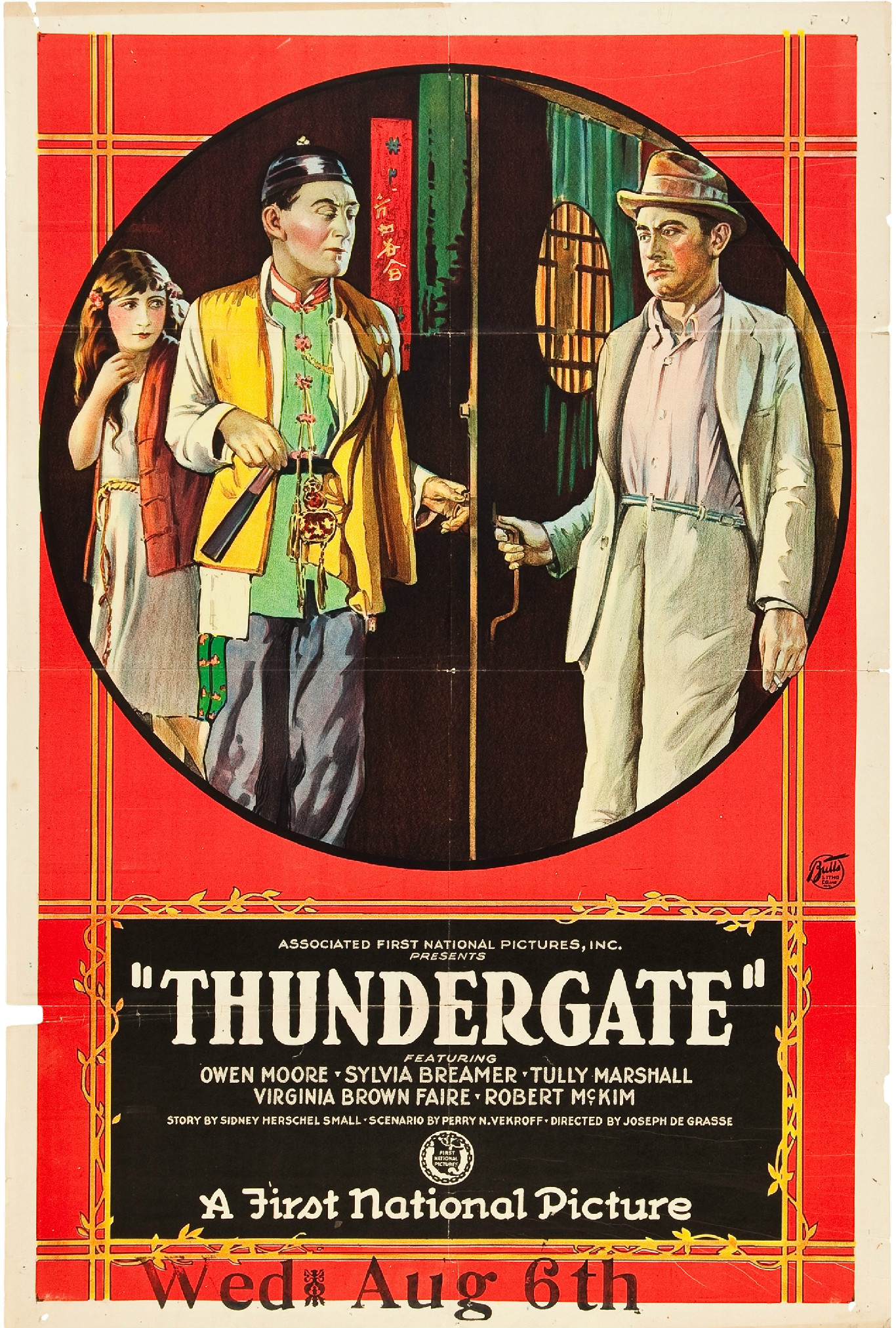
- Theatrical release poster
- Directed by: Joseph De Grasse
- Screenplay by: Perry N. Vekroff
- Story by: Sydney Herschel Small
- Starring: Owen Moore; Virginia Brown Faire; Edwin B. Tilton; Sylvia Breamer; Robert McKim; Richard Cummings
- Cinematography: Robert De Grasse; Sam Landers
- Production company: Associated First National Pictures
- Distributed by: Associated First National Pictures
- Release date: October 15, 1923
- Running time: 70 minutes
- Country: United States
- Language: Silent (English intertitles)

Thundergate is a 1923 American drama film directed by Joseph De Grasse and written by Perry N. Vekroff. The film stars Owen Moore, Virginia Brown Faire, Edwin B. Tilton, Sylvia Breamer, Robert McKim, and Richard Cummings. The film was released on October 15, 1923, by Associated First National Pictures.

== Cast ==
- Owen Moore as Robert Wells / Kong Sue
- Virginia Brown Faire as Ellen Ainsmith / Jen Jue
- Edwin B. Tilton as James Sanderson
- Sylvia Breamer as Alberta Hayward
- Robert McKim as Ray Williams
- Richard Cummings as Jim Davis
- W.E. Dyer as Mike
- Tully Marshall as Suen Tung
- Tote Du Crow as Yuen Kai
- Ynez Seabury as Mey Wang

== Preservation ==
A print of Thundergate is held by the Archives Du Film Du CNC in Bois d'Arcy.
