= Virtuous Wives =

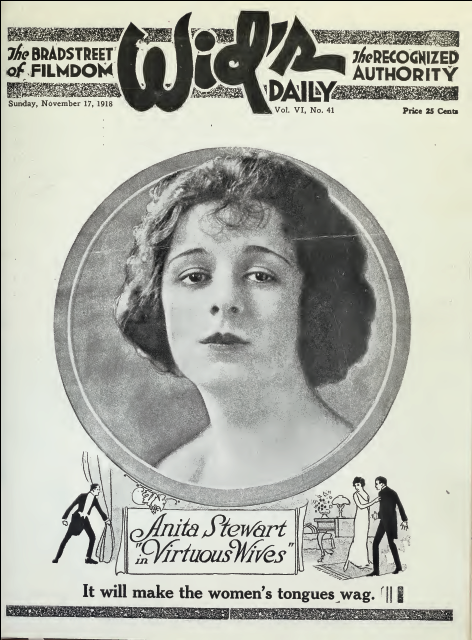
- Ad for film with Anita Stewart
- Directed by: George Loane Tucker
- Written by: George Loane Tucker (scenario)
- Based on: Virtuous Wives by Owen Johnson
- Produced by: Louis B. Mayer; Anita Stewart
- Starring: Anita Stewart
- Cinematography: Ernest Palmer
- Music by: Phil Spitalny
- Distributed by: First National Pictures
- Release date: December 28, 1918
- Running time: 60 minutes
- Country: United States
- Language: Silent (English intertitles)

Virtuous Wives is a lost 1918 American silent drama film directed by George Loane Tucker, and stars Anita Stewart. Future gossip columnist Hedda Hopper (billed as Mrs. DeWolf Hopper) co-starred. Based on the novel of the same name by Owen Johnson, the film was produced Anita Stewart's, production company. It was also the first film produced by Louis B. Mayer.

== Plot ==
Based upon a review in a film magazine, Amy and Andrew Forrester are happy in the first few weeks of their married life with the comforts that his $25,000 income brings. Andrew turns down a business opportunity with steel magnate Maurice Delabarre, but Delabarre decides he needs Andrew's business abilities, and invites the couple to his house. Amy finds her living standard wanting, and demands that Andrew accept the offer even though it will cause them to be separated. After he accepts, Amy throws herself into the gaieties of the social set and even challenges the position of Delabarre's wife Irma. Irma, finding her social throne tottering, sends for Andrew. On his return, he judges Amy's new lifestyle by old standards and wonders whether she is a virtuous wife.

== Cast ==
- Anita Stewart - Amy Forrester
- Conway Tearle - Andrew Forrester
- Mrs. DeWolf Hopper - Irma Delabarre
- Edwin Arden - Maurice Delabarre
- William "Stage" Boyd - Monte Bracken
- Virginia Norden - Mrs. Teake, Sr
- Katherine Lewis - Mrs. Teake Jr.
- Captain Mortimer - 'Jap; Laracy
- Harold Gwynn - Tubby Vandergrift
- Gwen Williams - Kitty Lightbody
- Lucille Clayton - Miss Rushin
- Thomas Carr - Bobby Delabarre
- Philip Leigh - Teddy Dawson
- George Stewart
