= Anthony Paul Kelly =

American screenwriter (1897–1932)

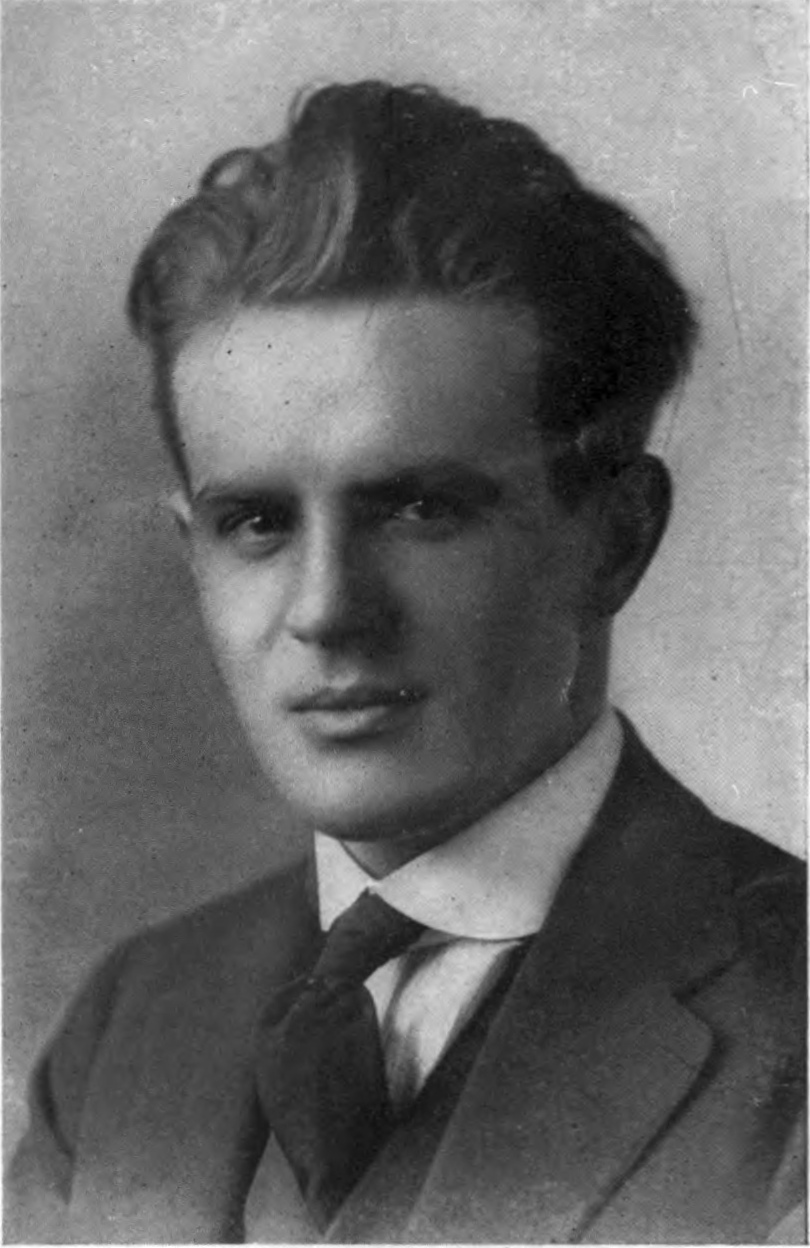
- Born: 1897; Chicago
- Died: September 26, 1932; Manhattan, New York City
- Occupation: Screenwriter
- Years active: 1914-1930

Anthony Paul Kelly (1897 – September 26, 1932) was an American playwright and screenwriter.

== Biography ==
Born in 1897 in New York City, Kelly wrote for 60 films between 1914 and 1930, and also wrote the play Three Faces East, which was the basis for two films of the same name. In 1926, Kelly gained notice for suing Al Jolson for breach of contract. The jury was discharged after failing to reach an agreement on a verdict.

He died in Manhattan in 1932 after committing suicide by inhaling gas. Kelly was battling an incurable case of tuberculosis at the time of his suicide.

== Selected filmography ==
- The Tear That Burned (1914)
- The Walls of Jericho (1914)
- Destiny (1915)
- The City of Failing Light (1916)
- The Light at Dusk (1916)
- The Conquest of Canaan (1916)
- The Voice in the Night (1916)
- The Accomplice (1917)
- Mayblossom (1917)
- The Bar Sinister (1917)
- God's Man (1917)
- The Recoil (1917)
- Outcast (1917)
- Raffles, the Amateur Cracksman (1917)
- My Own United States (1918)
- The Woman the Germans Shot (1918)
- Life's Greatest Problem (1918)
- The Common Cause (1919)
- Playthings of Destiny (1921)
- Love's Redemption (1921)
- My Old Kentucky Home (1922)
- The Silent Command (1923)
- The Governor's Lady (1923)
- The Scarlet West (1925)
- Three Faces East (1926) (based on his play)
- Three Faces East (1930) (based on his play)
- British Intelligence (1940) (also based on Three Faces East, starring Boris Karloff)
