= Virginia Norden =

American actress (1879–1948)

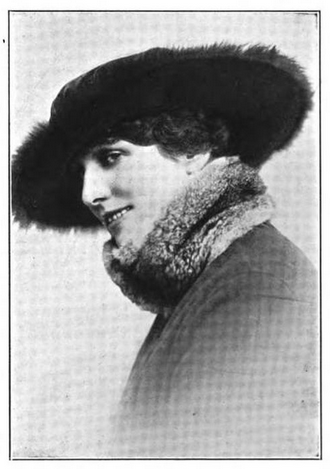
- Virginia Norden, from a 1916 publication
- Born: Violet Alice Dalton; May 4, 1879; Washington, D.C.
- Died: January 17, 1948 (aged 68); Los Angeles, California
- Other names: Violet A. Potts, Violet A. Nickel, Violet A. Bubeck (married names)
- Occupations: Actress, costume designer, modiste

Virginia Norden (May 4, 1879 – January 17, 1948), born Violet Alice Dalton, was an American actress on stage and in silent films.

== Early life ==
Violet Alice Dalton was from Washington, D.C., the daughter of William Newton Dalton and Olivia Alice Williams Dalton. Her father was a major in the United States Army. She studied acting at the American Academy of Dramatic Arts in New York.

== Career ==
=== Acting ===
Norden made her Broadway debut in 1913, in Poor Little Rich Girl by Eleanor Gates. She also wrote a play, Making the Movies (1916). In 1916, she contributed a recipe for "Virginia Chow Chow" to a charity cookbook, assembled by Mabel Rowland.

Norden's silent film credits included roles in Baby Hands (1912), For the Mikado (1912), Freddy the Fixer (1916), The Destroyers (1916, also known as Peter God), The Ancient Blood (1916), The Dupe (1916), The Deluded Wife (1916), The Combat (1916), The Dawn of a New Day (1916), Virtuous Wives (1918), and The Mind the Paint Girl (1919).

=== Clubwork during World War I ===
Norden formed and led a garden club in Brightwaters, Long Island in 1917, to encourage women to grow vegetables and market their produce locally. The "Patriotic Gardeners", as they were known, also gave benefit shows and raised funds for sending comfort kits, candy, cigarettes, and other supplies to Long Island men serving in World War I.

=== Fashion design ===
In 1913, Norden gave an interview on the subject of beauty, predicting that "Soon a rational era will come," when women "will revert to simple clothes, stop daubing their faces with cosmetics ... and use the time thus saved to cultivate heart and mind qualities." While working with director Ralph Ince in 1916, she also designed costumes and headed the wardrobe department at Ince Productions. After she left acting, she began a dress and millinery business with her cousin Martha Schorbach and her sister Olivia Dalton in New York, and was described as a "modiste" in 1928.

== Personal life ==
Violet Dalton married three times. Her first husband was Howard A. Potts; they married in 1898. She married Henry Nickel, in 1906; they divorced in 1928. She married a businessman, Otto Christopher Bubeck, in 1928. She was widowed by 1940, and she died in Los Angeles, California, in 1948, aged 68 years.
