= Anita Stewart =

American silent film actress and producer (1895–1961)

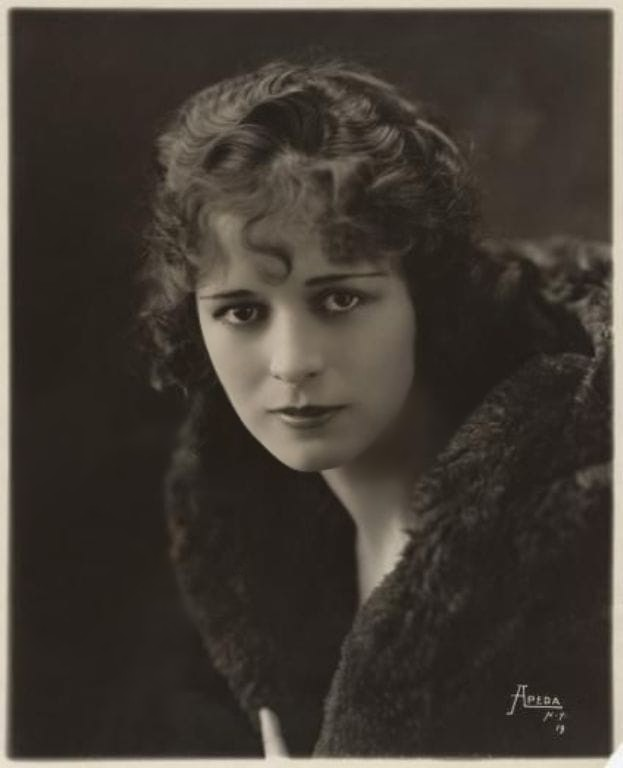
- Stewart c. 1920
- Born: Anna Marie Stewart; February 7, 1895; Brooklyn, New York, U.S.
- Died: May 4, 1961 (aged 66); Los Angeles, California, U.S.
- Resting place: Forest Lawn Memorial Park, Glendale
- Occupations: Actress, film producer
- Years active: 1911–1932
- Spouses: Rudolph Cameron (m. 1917; div. 1928) George Peabody Converse (m. 1929; div. 1946)
- Relatives: Lucille Lee (sister)

Anita Stewart (born Anna Marie Stewart; February 7, 1895 – May 4, 1961) was an American actress and film producer of the early silent film era.

== Early years ==
Anita Stewart was born in Brooklyn, New York, as Anna Marie Stewart on February 7, 1895, the middle child of three to parents William and Martha Stewart. Her elder sister Lucille Lee, and younger brother George also acted in films.

== Vitagraph Studios ==
Stewart began her acting career in 1911 at the age of 16 while still attending Erasmus Hall High School Stewart's brother-in-law, director Ralph Ince at Vitagraph film studios, married to Lucille Lee, arranged for the teen-aged Stuart to appear as a juvenile extra at their New York City studio location.

Stewart was one of the earliest film actresses to achieve public recognition in the nascent medium of motion pictures and achieved a great deal of acclaim early in her acting career. Within a year of joining Vitagraph, Stewart was playing lead roles, notably as the child-like Olympia in The Wood Violet (1912).

When Vitagraph publicity personnel accidentally published Stewart's name as "Anita Stewart" rather the hitherto "Anna M. Stewart", she adopted it as her professional name. By 1914, with the release of the melodramatic romance A Million Bid (1914), in which she played the long-suffering Agnes Belgradin, Stewart was elevated to a veritable screen icon. Film historian Hugh Neely describes the phenomenon:

Soon, Stewart was being promoted as "America's daintiest actress," and her image was featured on sheet music, souvenir plates, silver spoons, and a collection of paper dolls published in Ladies' World Magazine. In 1915, Munsey's Magazine noted that, though she had appeared in but two features and a serial and had never appeared on the theatrical stage, "her face is perhaps familiar to as wide a circle as Maude Adams's".

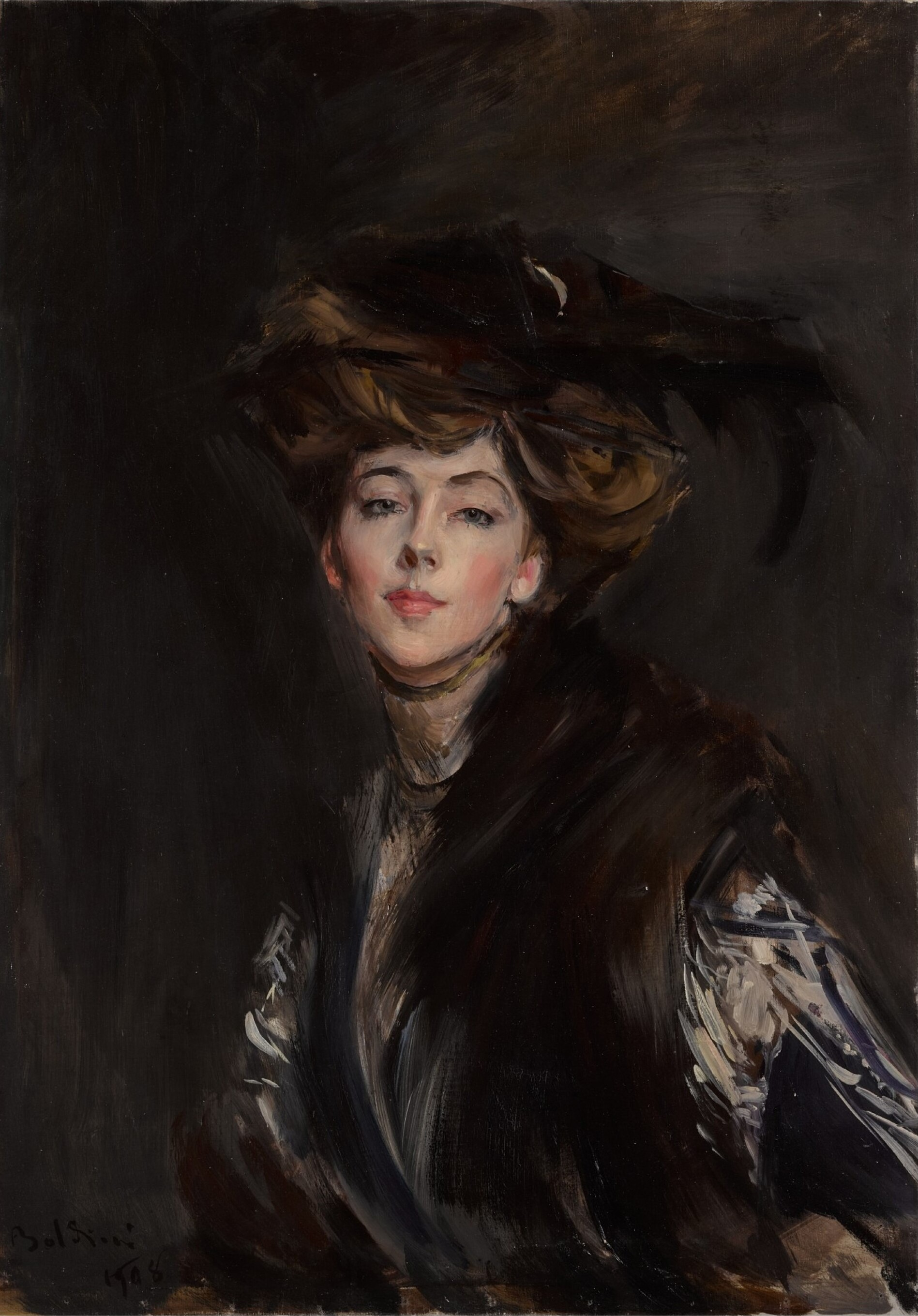
Portrait of Miss Anita Stewart (1908), by Giovanni Boldini

Stewart's success at Vitagraph proceeded unabated through 1915, where she was working with director and brother-in-law Ralph Ince. Vitagraph began assigning Stewart vehicles to directors other than Ince in 1916. The screen star objected, questioning the professionalism of one director, Wilfred North. Stewart walked off the set, reporting that she needed to convalesce after suffering injuries in an automobile accident—effectively canceling the production. This legal contretemps signaled the end of Stewart's six-year tenure at Vitagraph and her recruitment as a business associate and co-producer with aspiring movie mogul Louis B. Mayer in 1917.

== Anita Stewart Productions: 1918–1922 ==
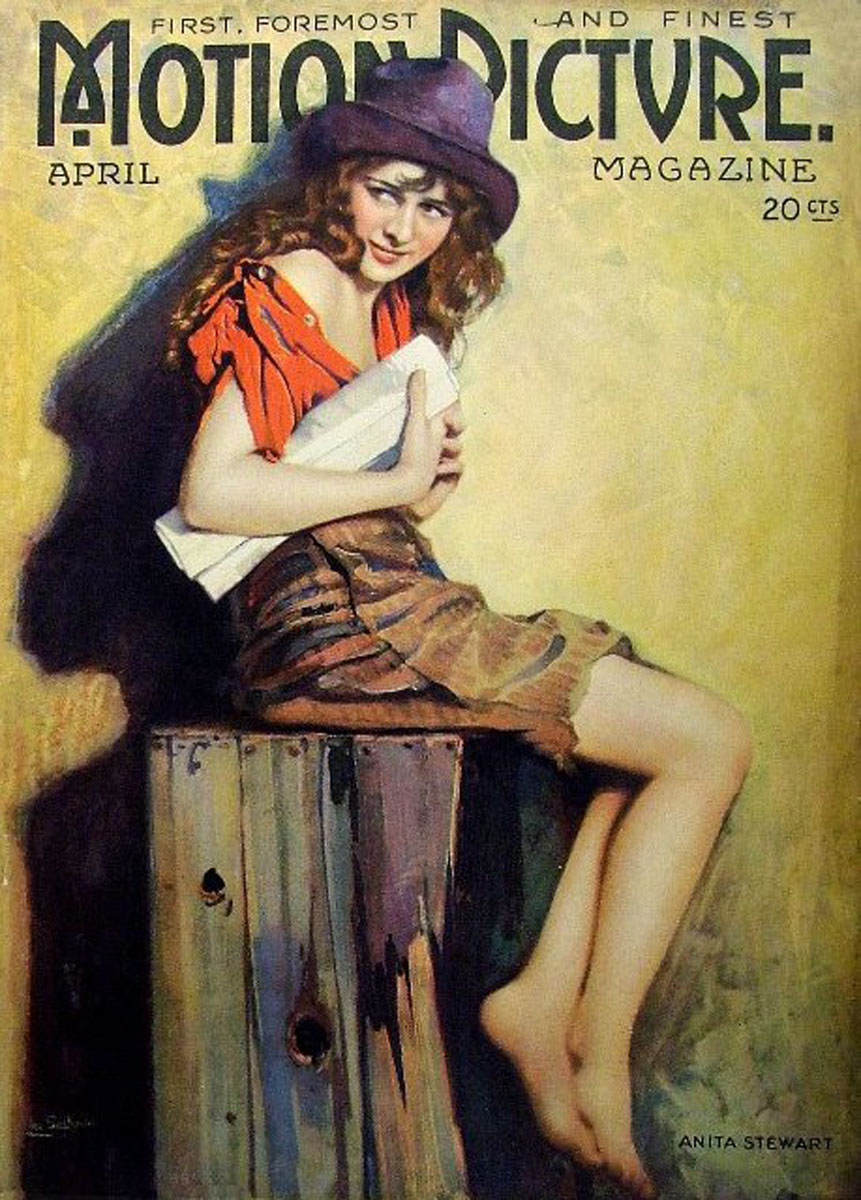
Motion Picture Magazine, April 1919. Anita Stewart: "America's daintiest actress" and "a slender screen fairy." Publicity portrait.

In 1917, Louis B. Mayer, then a successful New England movie exhibitor, wished to engage in producing independent films under the aegis of First National Exhibitors Circuit. As a prerequisite, he needed to bring a high-profile screen personality into the enterprise to attract investors. Mayer approached Stewart, who was still under contract to Vitagraph, and proposed they establish "Anita Stewart Productions."

Anxious to move to Hollywood, and promised opportunities to acquire quality directors and film roles, she contractually formed Anita Stewart Productions with Mayer in 1917. Stewart's husband and former co-star Rudolph Cameron, who she had married secretly in 1917, was enlisted as her business manager.

Vitagraph moved quickly to open litigation against Stewart for breach of contract, claiming that she was under obligation to the studio until 31 January 1918. Stewart's claims of illness or disability were rejected by the court, and she was made liable for all the days absent from the set. The settlement included $70,000 compensation to Vitagraph and a loss of revenue from her films. The decision is still cited today in actor–studio legal disputes.

Despite this initial setback, Anita Stewart Productions proceeded to make Virtuous Wives (1918). This was the first of the seventeen feature films that her production outfit completed between 1918 and 1922. After this successful production, Stewart and Mayer moved to Hollywood in 1919, operating at the facilities of the Selig Polyscope Company.

As actress-producer, Stewart enlisted filmmaker Lois Weber as a writer-director. At the time, Weber enjoyed her own studio provided by Universal Pictures, where she "controlled every aspect of production" creating films that advanced her "conservative moral universe." The Stewart-Weber collaboration produced the "unapologetically commercial" A Midnight Romance (1919), an adaption of a Marion Orth mystery-romance and Mary Regan (1919), another romance. An accomplished pianist and composer, Stewart wrote the music and lyrics for both films.

Stewart and Mayer obtained the services of some of Hollywood's most talented directors of that era. Marshall Neilan, who had directed and starred opposite Mary Pickford in several productions, made two pictures with Stewart: In Old Kentucky and Her Kingdom of Dreams (1919). Neilan's own recent attempt at independent filmmaking had failed. Among her other directors at Anita Stewart Productions were Edward José (The Fighting Shepherdess) (1920), Edwin Carewe (Playthings of Destiny) (1921) and John Stahl (Sowing the Wind) (1921).

Although the extent of Stewart's oversight as co-producer at Anita Stewart Productions is not clearly documented, historian Hugh Neely surmises that, as she was "consistently present on the set of her films, it seems logical to conclude that Stewart was in position to make the daily production decisions that might be required of her, as well as other creative decisions."

Stewart's increasing disaffection in her role as co-producer arose over Mayer's veto power over subject matter and the treatment of scenarios. Stewart championed adapting films that presented socially significant topics, including realistic literary treatments of prostitution (e.g. Theodore Dreiser's sexually provocative Sister Carrie). Mayer's "moralistic" outlook allowed only for features that would be suitable for family entertainment: "The sort of mature stories that appealed to Anita Stewart were out of the question." Stewart declined to renew her contract with Mayer in 1922 to resume a career in acting.

Shortly after closing Anita Stewart Productions, Stewart received news that her younger brother, actor George Stewart, suffered brain damage in a physical assault by their brother-in-law, director Ralph Ince. Ince was indicted for the assault. Invalided, Stewart would ultimately assume responsibility for George's care.

== Final years in Hollywood: 1923–1928 ==
Stewart returned to acting at William Randolph Hearst's Cosmopolitan Productions in 1923, where she starred in Frank J. Marion's The Love Pilot (1923). She completed two more Cosmopolitan pictures: The Great White Way (1924), directed by E. Mason Hopper, and Never the Twain Shall Meet (1925), directed by Maurice Tourneur. Stewart regarded the latter, in which she plays Tamea, her personal favorite, now a lost film. After leaving Cosmopolitan, Stewart began accepting roles offered by Poverty Row studios in order to stay employed.

The final film of her career was Romance of a Rogue (1928), in which she played opposite H. B. Warner and directed by King Baggot.

== Retirement and death ==
Stewart divorced Rudolph Cameron shortly after retiring from film, and married George Converse, an heir of a United States Steel president and they settled in Beverly Hills, California. Stewart made a number of appearances on film and radio and in 1932 made a brief appearance in The Hollywood Handicap. Stewart and Converse divorced in 1946.

On May 4, 1961, Stewart died of a heart attack in Beverly Hills, California.

=== Writing ===
Stewart authored the murder mystery novel The Devil's Toy, published in New York in 1935 by E.P. Dutton. Though the book's dust jacket traded on the author's Hollywood connection, the plot concerned the killing of a stage actor and was set in San Francisco.

== Recognition ==
For her contribution to motion picture industry as an actress, Stewart was given a star on the Hollywood Walk of Fame at 6724 Hollywood Boulevard.

== Selected filmography ==
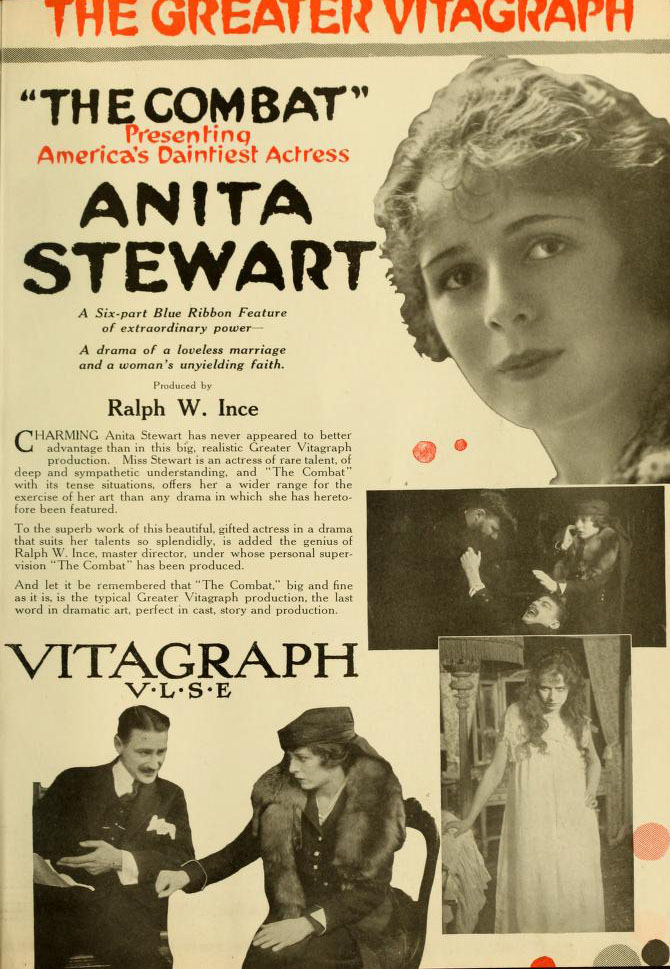
The Combat (1916)

| Year | Title | Role | Notes |
|---|---|---|---|
| 1911 | Prejudice of Pierre Marie | | Credited as Anna Stewart; Lost film |
| 1912 | Her Choice | May – The Vain Niece | |
| 1912 | Billy's Pipe Dream | Pert Dawson | Lost film |
| 1913 | The Swan Girl | The Swan Girl | Lost film |
| 1913 | A Regiment of Two | Mrs. Harry Bennett | Lost film Credited as Anna Stewart |
| 1913 | The Wreck | Rita Carlyle | Lost film |
| 1914 | The Girl from Prosperity | Bessie Williams | Lost film |
| 1914 | A Million Bid | Agnes Belgradin | Lost film |
| 1914 | The Painted World | Yvette Murree | Lost film |
| 1914 | The Sins of the Mothers | Trixie Graham Raymond | Lost film |
| 1915 | The Awakening | Jo | Lost film |
| 1915 | The Juggernaut | Viola Rushin/Louise Hardin | Incomplete film Two of five reels survive |
| 1915 | The Goddess | Celestia – The Goddess | Lost film |
| 1916 | My Lady's Slipper | Countess Gabrielle de Villars | Lost film |
| 1916 | The Suspect | Sophie Karrenina | Lost film |
| 1916 | The Daring of Diana | Diana | Lost film |
| 1916 | The Combat | Muriel Fleming | Lost film |
| 1917 | The Glory of Yolanda | Yolanda | Lost film |
| 1917 | The Girl Philippa | Philippa | Lost film |
| 1917 | The More Excellent Way | Chrissy Desselden | Lost film |
| 1917 | The Message of the Mouse | Wynn Winthrop | |
| 1917 | Clover's Rebellion | Clover Dean | Lost film |
| 1918 | Virtuous Wives | Amy Forrester | Lost film Also producer |
| 1919 | The Painted World | Yvette Murree | Lost film |
| 1919 | Two Women | Enid Arden | Lost film |
| 1919 | Mary Regan | Mary Regan | Lost film Also producer |
| 1919 | Shadows of the Past | Antoinette | Lost film |
| 1919 | Her Kingdom of Dreams | Judith Rutledge | Lost film Also producer |
| 1919 | Human Desire | Bernice | Also producer |
| 1919 | The Mind the Paint Girl | Lily Upjohn/Lily Parradell | Lost film Also producer |
| 1919 | In Old Kentucky | Madge Brierly | Also producer |
| 1919 | A Midnight Romance | Marie | Incomplete film Also producer |
| 1920 | The Fighting Shepherdess | Kate Prentice | Alternative title: Vindication; Also producer |
| 1920 | The Yellow Typhoon | Hilda / Berta Nordstrom | Lost film Also producer |
| 1920 | Harriet and the Piper | Harriet Field | Lost film Also producer |
| 1921 | Playthings of Destiny | Julie Arnold | Also producer |
| 1921 | Sowing the Wind | Rosaamund Athelstane | Also producer |
| 1921 | The Invisible Fear | Sylvia Langdon | Lost film Also producer |
| 1921 | Her Mad Bargain | Alice Lambert | Lost film Also producer |
| 1922 | Rose o' the Sea | Rose Elton | Lost film Also producer |
| 1922 | A Question of Honor | Anne Wilmot | Lost film Also producer |
| 1922 | The Woman He Married | Natalie Lane | Lost film Also producer |
| 1923 | Souls for Sale | Herself | |
| 1923 | The Love Piker | Hope Warner | Lost film |
| 1923 | Mary of the Movies | Herself | Incomplete film |
| 1923 | Hollywood | Herself | Lost film |
| 1924 | The Great White Way | Mabel Vandegrift | Lost film |
| 1925 | Never the Twain Shall Meet | Tamea | Lost film |
| 1925 | The Boomerang | Virginia Zelva | |
| 1925 | Go Straight | Self | Lost film |
| 1925 | Baree, Son of Kazan | Nepeese | Lost film |
| 1926 | Rustling for Cupid | Sybil Hamilton | Lost film |
| 1926 | The Prince of Pilsen | Nellie Wagner | Lost film |
| 1926 | Morganson's Finish | Barbara Wesley | Lost film |
| 1926 | The Lodge in the Wilderness | Virginia Coulson | |
| 1926 | Whispering Wires | Doris Stockbridge | |
| 1927 | The Isle of Sunken Gold | Princess Kala of Tafofu | Incomplete film |
| 1927 | Wild Geese | Lind Archer | Lost film |
| 1928 | Sisters of Eve | Beatrice Franklin | Lost film |
| 1928 | Romance of a Rogue | Charmain | |
| 1928 | Name the Woman | Florence | |

== Sources ==
- Bodeen, DeWitt (1976). From Hollywood: The Careers of 15 Great American Stars. A. S. Barnes & Company. ISBN 978-0-498-01346-1.
- Higham, Charles. 1973. The Art of the American Film: 1900-1971. Doubleday & Company, Inc. New York. ISBN 0-385-06935-9
- Neely, Hugh. 2013. Anita Stewart. In Jane Gaines, Radha Vatsal, and Monica Dall'Asta, eds. Women Film Pioneers Project. New York, NY: Columbia University Libraries, 2013. https://doi.org/10.7916/d8-4bse-4g29 Retrieved 19 June 2021.
- Koszarski, Richard. 1976. Hollywood Directors: 1914-1940. Oxford University Press. Library of Congress Catalog Number: 76-9262.
- Robinson, David. 1968. Hollywood in the Twenties. Paperback Library, New York. Library of Congress Catalog Card Number 68-24002
- Slide, Anthony. 1970. Early American Cinema. The International Film Guide Series. A. S. Barnes & Co. New York. ISBN 0-498-07717-9
