= The Combat (1916 film) =

1916 film by Ralph Ince

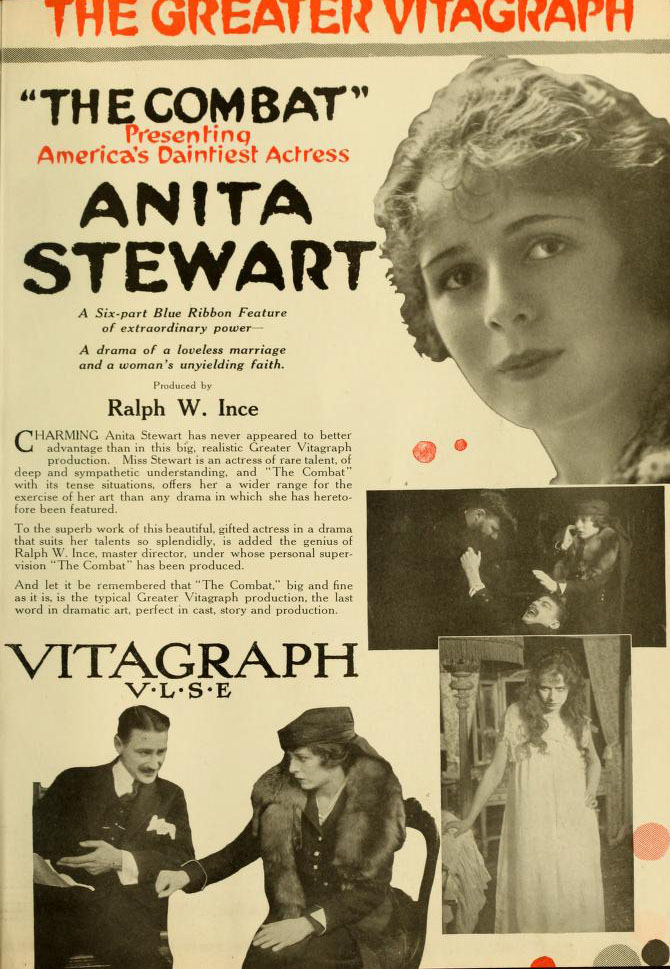
- lobby poster
- Directed by: Ralph Ince
- Cinematography: Jules Cronjager
- Distributed by: Vitagraph Company of America
- Release date: September 18, 1916
- Running time: 6 reels
- Country: USA
- Language: Silent...English titles

The Combat is a lost silent film drama directed by Ralph Ince and starring Anita Stewart. It was produced by the Vitagraph Company of America.

== Cast ==
- Anita Stewart - Muriel Fleming
- John S. Robertson - Philip Lewis
- Richard Turner - Graydon Burton
- Virginia Norden - Mrs. Fleming
- Winthrop Mendell - Herman Slade
- Wilfred Lytell - (*uncredited)
