= Three Sevens =

1921 silent film

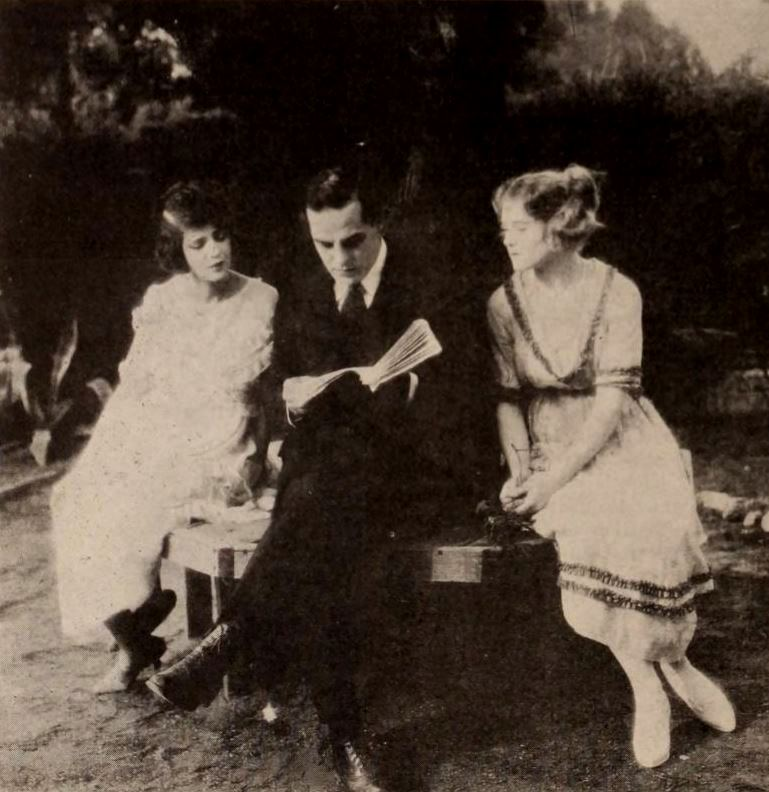
- Directed by: Chester Bennett
- Written by: Perley Poore Sheehan (novel); Calder Johnstone
- Produced by: Albert E. Smith
- Starring: Antonio Moreno; Jean Calhoun; Emmett King
- Cinematography: Jack MacKenzie
- Production company: Vitagraph Company of America
- Distributed by: Vitagraph Company of America
- Release date: January 10, 1921
- Running time: 50 minutes
- Country: United States
- Languages: Silent; English intertitles

Three Sevens is a 1921 American silent drama film directed by Chester Bennett and starring Antonio Moreno, Jean Calhoun and Emmett King.

== Cast ==
- Antonio Moreno as Daniel Craig
- Jean Calhoun as Joan Gracie
- Emmett King as Major Jerome Gracie
- Geoffrey Webb as Gary Lee
- DeWitt Jennings as Samuel Green
- Starke Patteson as Brewster Green
- Beatrice Burnham as Amy Green

== Bibliography ==
- Munden, Kenneth White. The American Film Institute Catalog of Motion Pictures Produced in the United States, Part 1. University of California Press, 1997.
