= Never the Twain Shall Meet (1925 film) =

1925 film directed by Maurice Tourneur

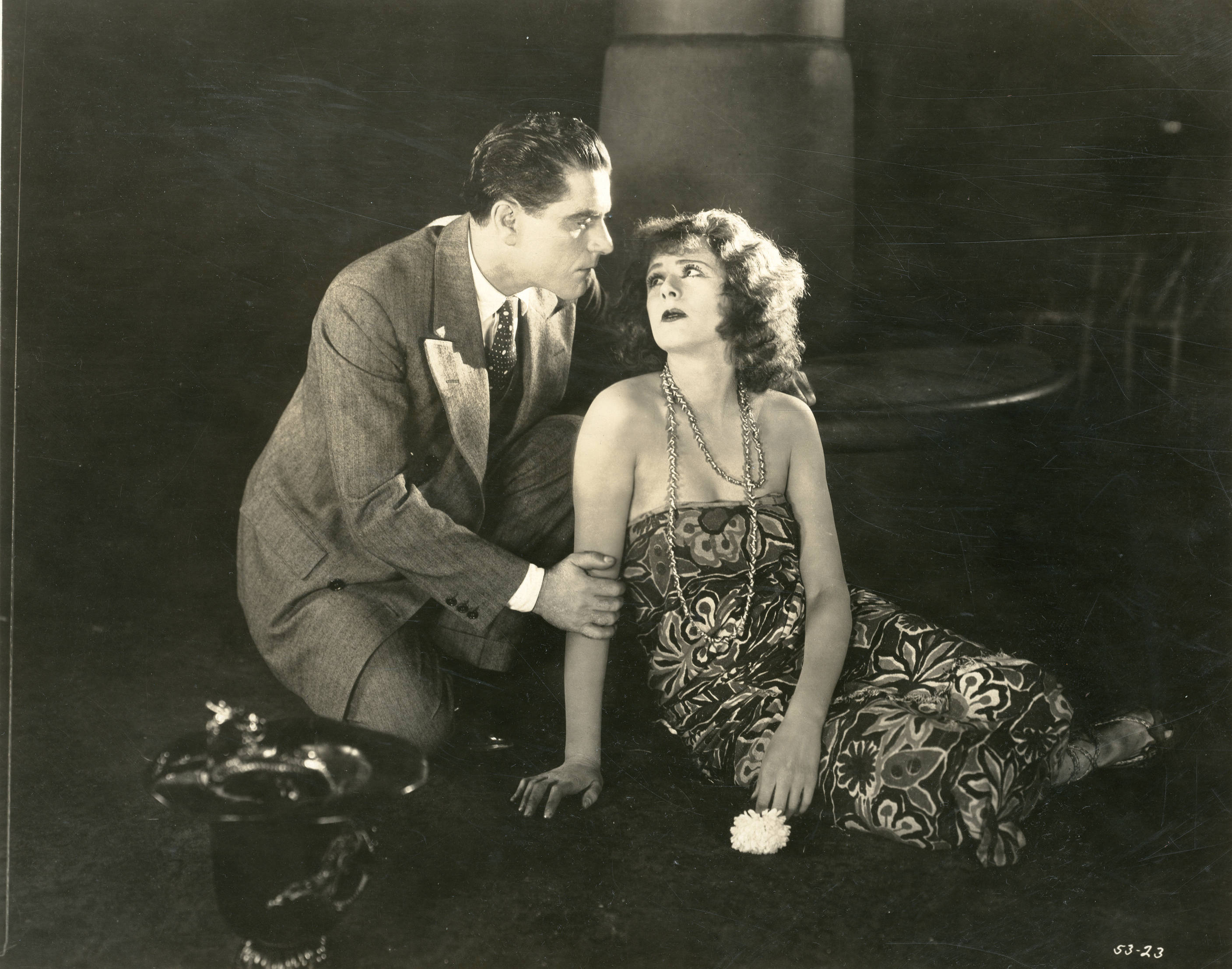
- Film still
- Directed by: Maurice Tourneur
- Written by: Peter B. Kyne; Eugene Mullin
- Based on: Never the Twain Shall Meet; 1923 novel by Peter B. Kyne
- Produced by: Louis B. Mayer; Irving Thalberg
- Starring: Anita Stewart; Bert Lytell
- Cinematography: Ira H. Morgan; J.B. Shackelford
- Edited by: W. Donn Hayes
- Production company: Cosmopolitan Productions
- Distributed by: Metro-Goldwyn-Mayer
- Release date: September 13, 1925
- Running time: 80 minutes
- Country: United States
- Language: Silent (English intertitles)

Never the Twain Shall Meet is a 1925 American silent South Seas drama film based on the book by Peter B. Kyne, produced by MGM and directed by Maurice Tourneur, starring Anita Stewart and featuring Boris Karloff in an uncredited bit part. It was remade as talking picture in 1931 at MGM by director W. S. Van Dyke. This is one of Tourneur's many lost and sought after films.

== Plot ==
As described in a film magazine review, Tamea, whose mother was Polynesian and her father French, leaves the island where her father governs and goes with him on a trade trip to San Francisco. When they arrive in port, the health officers find that the father is a leper, and he jumps into the water and is drowned. Tamea is taken to the home of Dan Pritchard, the junior partner of the firm that her father traded through. With his friend Mark Mellenger, Dan tries to show the visiter a good time around town. Although Dan is engaged to Maisie Morrison, a young society woman, his affections are drawn to Tamea. When she hastily leaves for home, Dan follows her. She falls violently in love with him and they are married according to the native custom of the island. The South Seas gets into his blood and Dan falls into moral dissolution. Mark arrives on the island to visit him with Maisie in tow. Dan returns to San Francisco and marries Maisie while Mark on the island to comfort Tamea.

== Cast ==
- Anita Stewart as Tamea
- Bert Lytell as Dan Pritchard
- Huntley Gordon as Mark Mellenger
- Justine Johnstone as Maisie Morrison
- George Siegmann as James Muggridge
- Lionel Belmore as Gaston Larrieau
- William Norris as Squibbs
- Emily Fitzroy as Mrs. Pippy
- Princess Marie De Bourbon as Miss Smith
- Florence Turner as Julia
- James Wang as Sooey Wan
- Ben Deeley as Doctor (*posthumous release)
- Tom Ricketts as Andrew J. Casson (credited as Thomas Ricketts)
- Ernest Butterworth as Captain Hackett
- Roy Coulson as Assistant Doctor
- Boris Karloff in a bit part (uncredited)

== Preservation ==
In February of 2021, Never the Twain Shall Meet was cited by the National Film Preservation Board on their Lost U.S. Silent Feature Films list and is therefore presumed lost.
