= The Web of Chance =

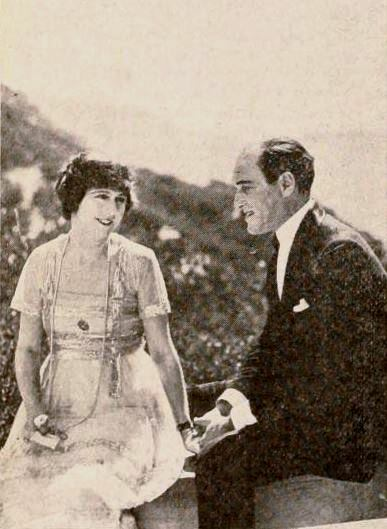
- Still from the film
- Directed by: Alfred E. Greene
- Written by: Douglas Bronston
- Based on: Right After Brown by Edgar Franklin
- Starring: Peggy Hyland; Harry Hamm; Edwin B. Tilton
- Cinematography: Frank Good
- Production company: Fox Film Corporation
- Distributed by: Fox Film Corporation
- Release date: December 21, 1919
- Running time: 50 minutes (5 reels)
- Country: United States
- Language: Silent (English intertitles)

The Web of Chance is a 1919 silent comedy film directed by Alfred E. Greene. It was produced by the Fox Film Corporation.

== Plot ==
Dorothy Hale is the niece and secretary of John Harrison, head of a detective bureau. Dorothy has aspirations of becoming a girl detective and a youth named Henry, also employed in the office, has similar hopes. Henry is already making a study of the art of detecting and wears disguises when opportunity offers. While Dorothy and her uncle are enjoying a quiet vacation, they meet a young man named Arthur Brown. The latter falls In love with Dorothy, but is forced to leave the hotel for business reasons before he has made known his affections. On their return to the city, Harrison Is called upon to Investigate the theft of a million-dollar estimate, stolen from the private files of the Sarsfleld Company. Arthur Brown, supposed employee, is suspected, and he turns out to be the young fellow Harrison and his niece had met on their vacation. Dorothy becomes interested In the cast and undertakes to shadow Brown. She visits his room at a big hotel, where she has taken employment as a maid, and later trails him into the country. In the denouement it develops that Brown is really Arthur Brown Sarsfield, head of the contracting company, and that the crime was committed by an employee. Arthur and Dorothy are married by a country justice.

== Cast ==
- Peggy Hyland as Dorothy Hale
- Harry Hamm as Arthur Brown Sarsfield
- Edwin B. Tilton as John Harrison
- William Machin as Thorne Potter
- George Dromgold as Henry
- Sam Appel as Detective

== Reception ==
A contemporary review in the Salt Lake Herald praised Peggy Hyland's performance.

A contemporary review in the Press of Atlantic City also praised her performance.
