= The Cub Reporter =

1922 silent film

- Directed by: John Francis Dillon
- Written by: George Elwood Jenks
- Produced by: Phil Goldstone
- Starring: Richard Talmadge; Jean Calhoun; Edwin B. Tilton
- Cinematography: Harry M. Fowler
- Production company: Phil Goldstone Productions
- Distributed by: Truart Film Corporation
- Release date: August 1922
- Running time: 50 minutes
- Country: United States
- Languages: Silent; English intertitles

The Cub Reporter is a 1922 American silent action film directed by John Francis Dillon and starring Richard Talmadge, Jean Calhoun and Edwin B. Tilton.

== Cast ==
- Richard Talmadge as Dick Harvey
- Jean Calhoun as Marion Rhodes
- Edwin B. Tilton as Harrison Rhodes
- Clarence Wilson as Mandarin
- Lewis Mason as Crook
- Ethel Hallor as Crook

== Censorship ==
Before The Cub Reporter could be exhibited in Kansas, the Kansas Board of Review required the removal of scenes where a woman and a Chinese man are smoking.

== Bibliography ==
- Munden, Kenneth White. The American Film Institute Catalog of Motion Pictures Produced in the United States, Part 1. University of California Press, 1997. ISBN 978-0-520-20969-5.
