= Playthings of Destiny =

1921 American romance film

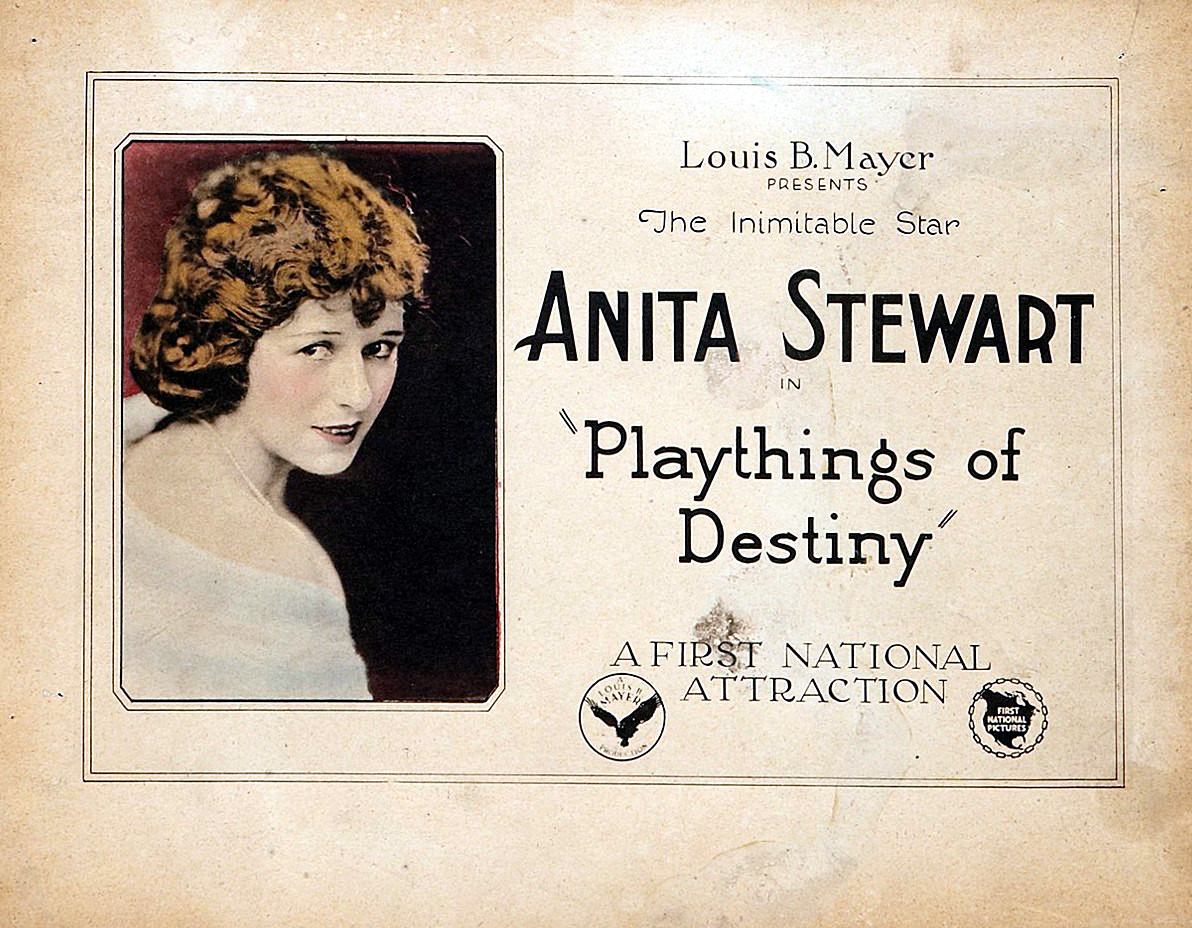
- Lobby card
- Directed by: Edwin Carewe
- Screenplay by: Anthony Paul Kelly
- Based on: Playthings of Destiny by Jane Murfin
- Starring: Anita Stewart; Herbert Rawlinson; Walter McGrail; Grace Morse; William V. Mong; Richard Headrick
- Cinematography: Robert Kurrle
- Production companies: Anita Stewart Productions; Louis B. Mayer Productions
- Distributed by: Associated First National Pictures
- Release date: May 1921
- Running time: 70 minutes
- Country: United States
- Language: Silent (English intertitles)

Playthings of Destiny is a 1921 American romance film directed by Edwin Carewe and written by Anthony Paul Kelly. The film stars Anita Stewart, Herbert Rawlinson, Walter McGrail, Grace Morse, William V. Mong, and Richard Headrick. The film was released in May 1921, by Associated First National Pictures.

== Cast ==
- Anita Stewart as Julie Arnold
- Herbert Rawlinson as Geoffrey Arnold
- Walter McGrail as Hubert Randolph
- Grace Morse as Claire
- William V. Mong as Conklin
- Richard Headrick as Julie's child

== Preservation ==
With no prints of Playthings of Destiny located in any film archives, it is considered a lost film.
