= A Midnight Romance =

1919 film directed by Lois Weber

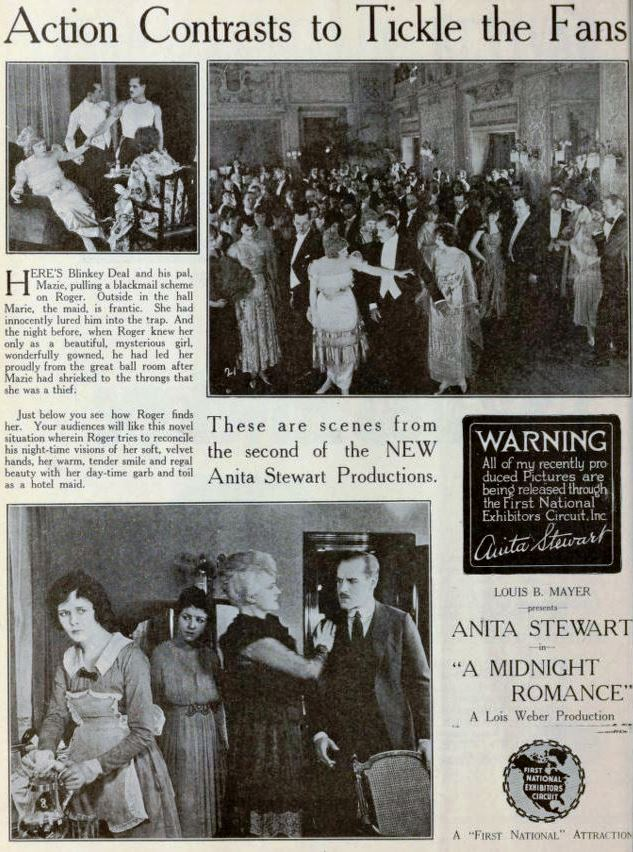
- Directed by: Lois Weber
- Written by: Lois Weber
- Based on: a story by Marion Orth
- Produced by: Anita Stewart; Louis B. Mayer
- Starring: Anita Stewart
- Cinematography: Dal Clawson
- Production companies: Anita Stewart Productions; Louis B. Mayer Productions
- Distributed by: First National Exhibitors' Circuit
- Release date: March 10, 1919
- Running time: 60 minutes
- Country: United States
- Languages: Silent film (English intertitles)

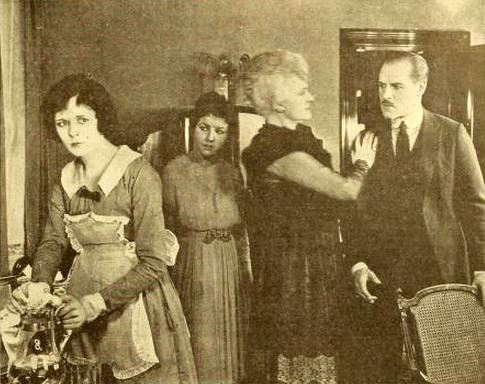
A scene from the film.

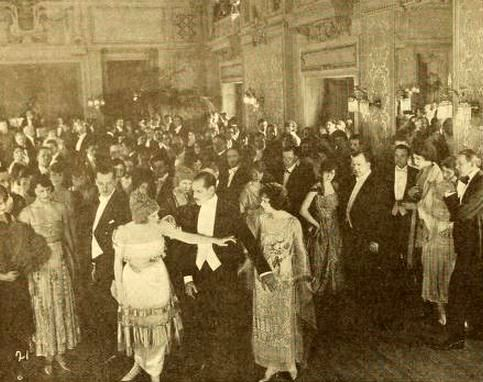
A scene in the film.

A Midnight Romance is a 1919 American silent romantic drama film directed by Lois Weber and starring Anita Stewart. It was produced by Stewart and Louis B. Mayer. It was only feature film between First National and Metro Pictures' producer Louis Mayer.

== Cast ==
- Anita Stewart as Marie
- Jack Holt as Roger Sloan
- Edwin B. Tilton as Roger's Father
- Elinor Hancock as Roger's Mother
- Helen Yoder as Roger's Sister
- Juanita Hansen as Blondie Maze
- Montague Dumond as Blinkey Deal

== Preservation status ==
The film is preserved incomplete in the Library of Congress collection.
