= The Phantom Melody =

1920 film by Douglas Gerrard

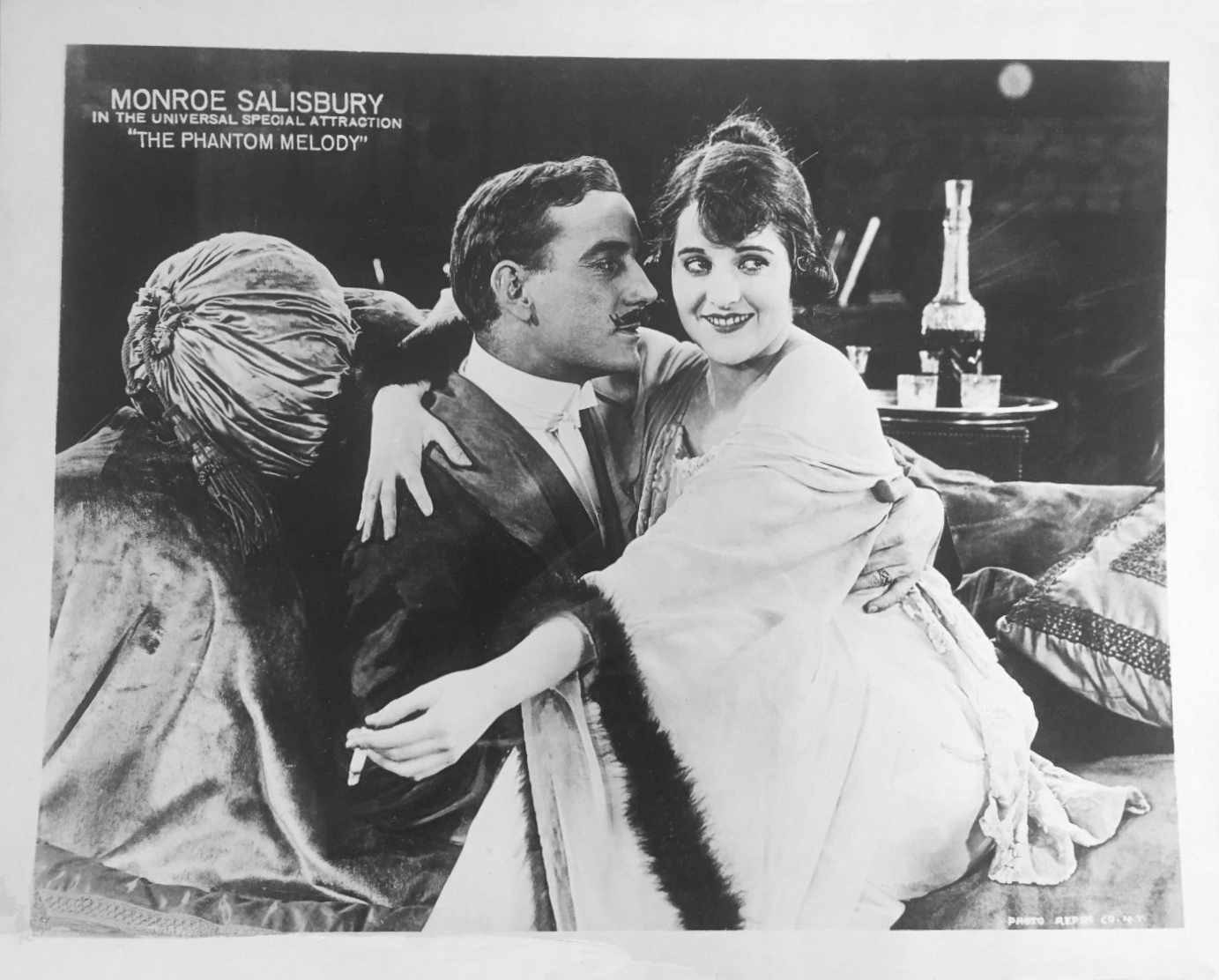
- Lobby card
- Directed by: Douglas Gerrard
- Screenplay by: F. McGrew Willis
- Starring: Monroe Salisbury; Henry A. Barrows; Ray Gallagher; Charles West; Jean Calhoun
- Cinematography: Roy H. Klaffki
- Distributed by: Universal Film Manufacturing Company
- Release date: January 27, 1920
- Running time: 66 minutes
- Country: United States
- Language: Silent (English intertitles)

The Phantom Melody is a 1920 American silent drama film directed by Douglas Gerrard, and starring Monroe Salisbury, Henry A. Barrows, Ray Gallagher, Charles West and Jean Calhoun. The film was released by Universal Film Manufacturing Company on January 27, 1920. The film's "premature burial" plotline tilts it in the direction of being a horror film as well as a melodrama. Director Gerrard emigrated to Hollywood from Ireland in 1913 to become an actor, but quickly gravitated to film directing in 1916 with his The Price of Victory, but gave up directing soon after filming The Phantom Melody.

== Plot ==
A wealthy count named Camello is in love with Mary Drake, but his cousin Gregory Baldi is also pursuing her. World War 2 breaks out, and Gregory is thought to have been killed in action. The Count succeeds in getting Mary to marry him, but on the eve of their wedding, Gregory returns home alive. Seeking to rid himself of his rival, Gregory buries Camello alive in an underground vault. Camello manages to get free and engages Gregory in a deadly duel.

== Cast ==
- Monroe Salisbury as Count Camello
- Jean Calhoun as Mary Drake
- Charles West as Gregory Baldi
- Henry A. Barrows as Sir James Drake
- Ray Gallagher as His Son Oliver
- Joe Ray as Gustave Tornelli
- Milton Markwell as Baron Ferrera
- Lois Lee as Paulette

== Preservation ==
The film is now considered lost.
