= The Taming of the West (1925 film) =

1925 film

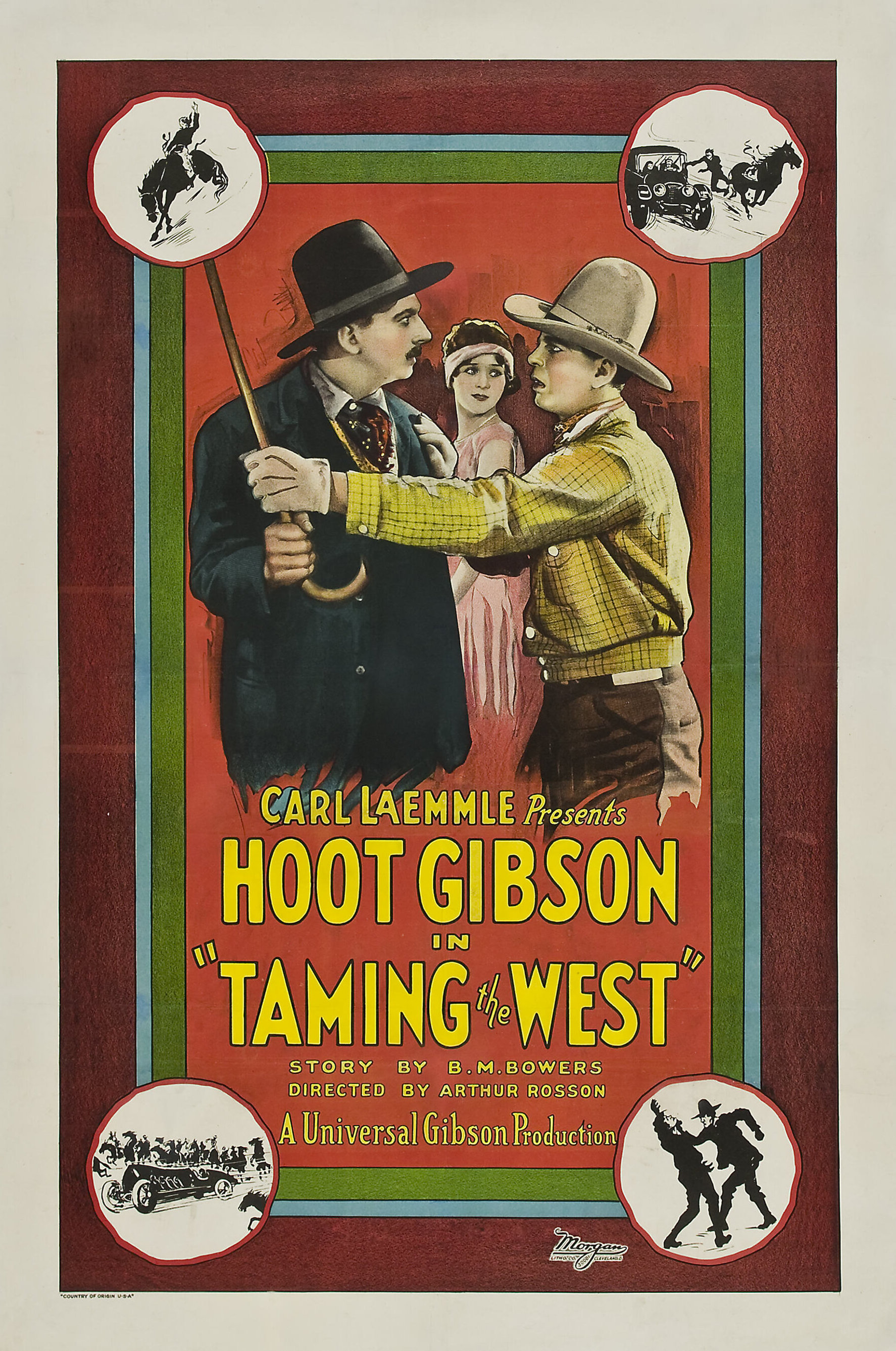
- Poster for the film
- Directed by: Arthur Rosson
- Written by: Raymond L. Schrock
- Based on: novel, The Range Dwellers, by Bertha Muzzy Sinclair c.1906
- Produced by: Carl Laemmle
- Starring: Hoot Gibson
- Cinematography: Harry Neumann
- Distributed by: Universal Pictures
- Release date: March 1, 1925
- Running time: 60 minutes
- Country: United States
- Languages: Silent; English intertitles

The Taming of the West is a lost 1925 American silent Western film directed by Arthur Rosson and starring top cowboy star Hoot Gibson.

== Cast ==
- Hoot Gibson - John Carleton
- Marceline Day - Beryl
- Morgan Brown - Terrence Weaver
- Edwin Booth Tilton - John P. Carleton
- Herbert Prior - Old Man King
- Louise Hippe - Perry Potter
- Albert J. Smith - Lafe Conners
- Francis Ford - Frosty Miller
- Frona Hale - Aunt Lodenna

== See also ==
- Hoot Gibson filmography
