= Three Faces East (1930 film) =

1930 film

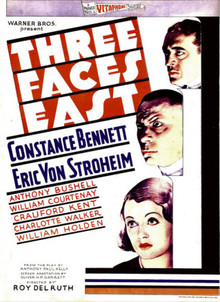
- Theatrical release poster
- Directed by: Roy Del Ruth
- Written by: Oliver H. P. Garrett; Arthur Caesar
- Based on: Three Faces East (play) by Anthony Paul Kelly
- Produced by: Daryl Zanuck
- Starring: Constance Bennett
- Cinematography: Barney McGill
- Edited by: William Holmes
- Music by: Paul Lamkoff
- Distributed by: Warner Bros. Pictures
- Release date: July 26, 1930 (US premiere)
- Running time: 71 minutes
- Country: United States
- Language: English

Full film

Three Faces East is a 1930 American pre-Code spy drama film directed by Roy Del Ruth and starring Constance Bennett and Erich von Stroheim. Produced by Daryl Zanuck and released by Warner Bros. Pictures it is based on a 1918 Broadway play about World War I spies, Three Faces East, by Anthony Paul Kelly. It was filmed as a silent in 1926. A later remake in 1940 starred Boris Karloff and Margaret Lindsay was titled British Intelligence.

== Plot ==
During World War I, a soldier named Valdar receives a medal for bravery from the King of Belgium. Elsewhere, behind German lines, a captured British nurse is revealed to be a German spy. She is given an assignment to infiltrate the household of Sir Winston Chamberlain, the British First Lord of the Admiralty, and steal secrets for her superior, a German spy named Blecher. Under the name Frances Hawtree, the agent, using the code term "three faces east," discovers that Valdar, who has used his award to place himself as Chamberlain's head butler, is actually her contact, a German spy named Schiller. Both Hawtree and Valdar come under suspicion from Chamberlain's associates, and both Valdar and Chamberlain's son fall in love with her. Eventually, it is revealed that Hawtree is actually a British double-agent working to find and expose the master spy Blecher, the true identity of Schiller/Valdar. When Blecher attempts to send secret information to his superiors, Hawtree shoots him and she is sent to Sweden on a new intelligence mission.

== Cast ==
- Constance Bennett as Frances Hawtree/Z-1
- Erich von Stroheim as Valdar/Schiller/Blecher
- Anthony Bushell as Captain Arthur Chamberlain
- William Holden as Sir Winston Chamberlain
- William Courtenay as Mr. Yates
- Crauford Kent as General Hewlett
- Charlotte Walker as Catherine, Lady Chamberlain
- Ullrich Haupt as Colonel
- Paul Panzer as "Kirsch" the Decoy
- Wilhelm von Brincken as Captain Kugler

== Preservation ==
The film survived complete. It was transferred into a 16mm film by Associated Artists Productions in 1956–1958 and shown on television. A 16mm copy is housed at the Wisconsin Center for Film & Theater Research. Another print exists at the Library of Congress.
