= A Million Bid (1927 film) =

1927 film

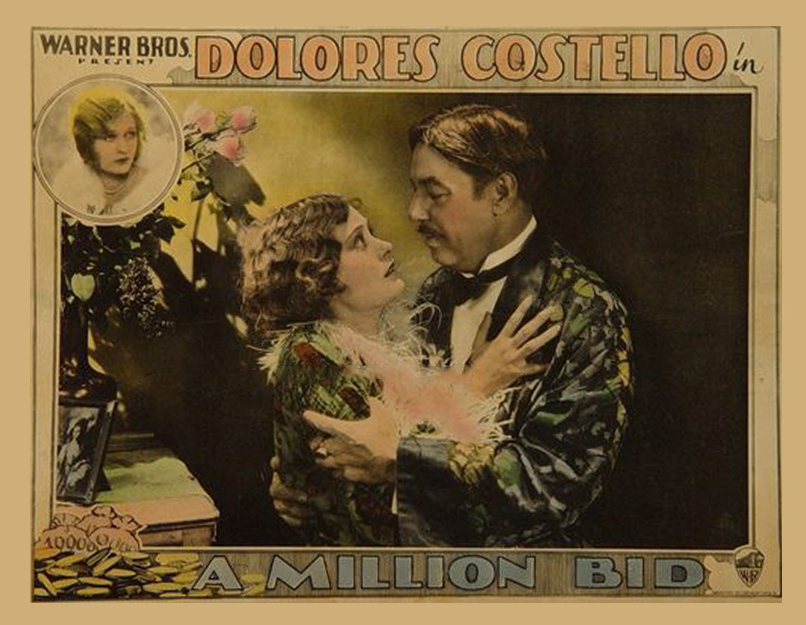
- Directed by: Michael Curtiz
- Written by: Robert Dillon (scenario)
- Based on: Agnes (1908 play) by "George Cameron" (Gladys Rankin Drew)
- Starring: Dolores Costello; Warner Oland
- Cinematography: Hal Mohr
- Production company: Warner Bros.
- Distributed by: Warner Bros.
- Release date: May 28, 1927
- Running time: 70 minutes
- Country: United States
- Language: English

A Million Bid is a 1927 silent drama film directed by Michael Curtiz and starring Dolores Costello. It is based on the 1908 play, Agnes, by Gladys Rankin Drew writing under the pseudonym "George Cameron".

The story was previously filmed in 1914 under the same name.

== Cast ==
- Dolores Costello as Dorothy Gordon
- Warner Oland as Geoffrey Marsh
- Malcolm McGregor as Dr. Robert Brent
- Betty Blythe as Mrs. Gordon
- William Demarest as George Lamont
- Douglas Gerrard as Lord Bobby Vane
- Grace Gordon as Maid to the Gordons

== Preservation status ==
An incomplete print of this film, with Italian intertitles, is housed at the Library of Congress.
