= A Million Bid (1914 film) =

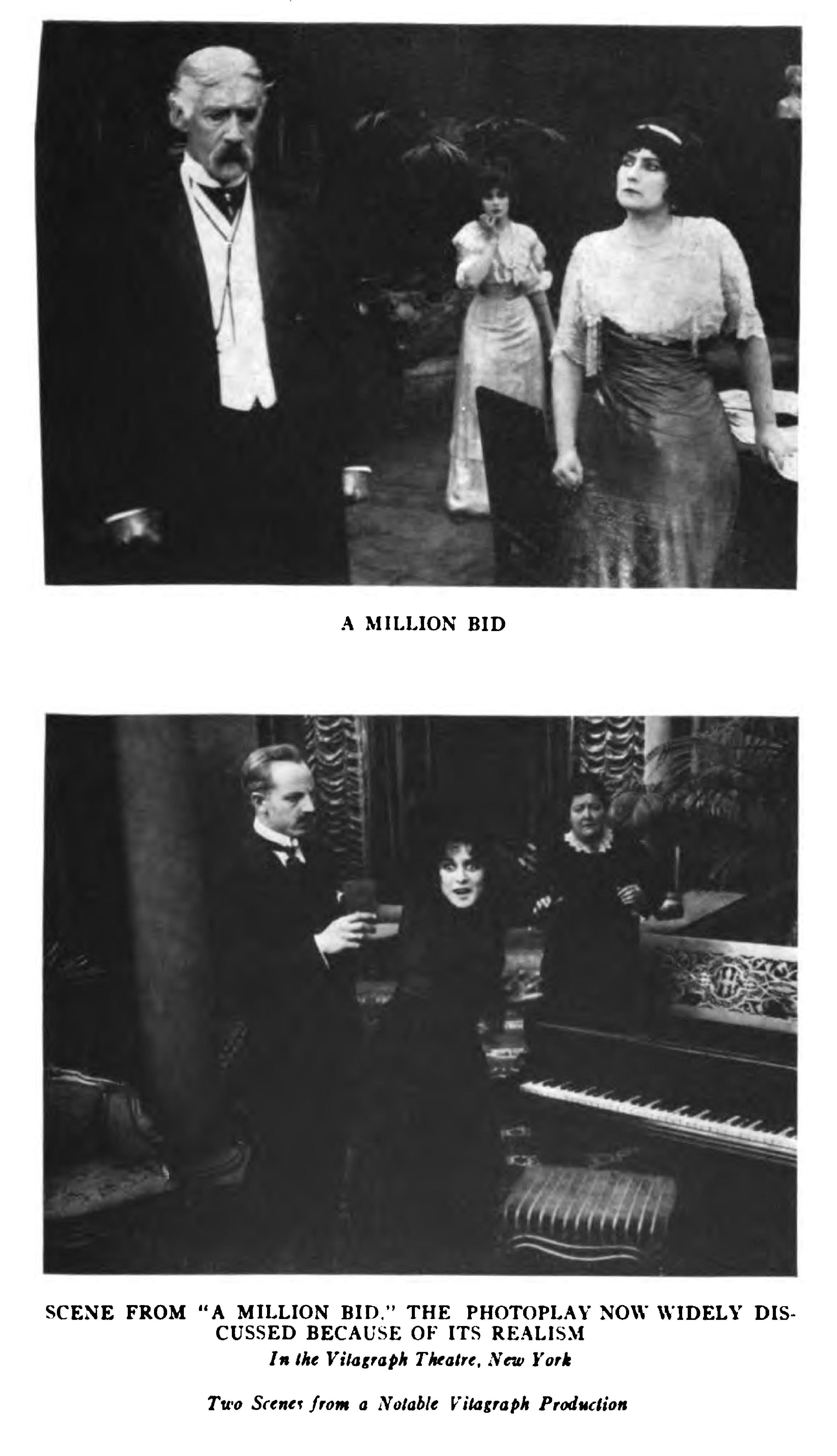
- Directed by: Ralph Ince
- Written by: Gladys Rankin Drew (play: Agnes); Marguerite Bertsch (scenario)
- Starring: Anita Stewart
- Cinematography: William T. Stewart
- Production company: Vitagraph Company of America
- Distributed by: General Film Company
- Release date: April 1914
- Running time: 4 - 5 reels
- Language: Silent (English intertitles)

A Million Bid is a lost 1914 American silent drama film produced by Vitagraph Company of America, directed by Ralph Ince and starred Anita Stewart. It is based on a stage play Agnes by Gladys Rankin (1874–1914). Later filmed by Vitagraph's successor, Warner Brothers, in 1927 starring Dolores Costello.

== Plot ==
According to a film magazine, "The story concerns a mercenary and managing mother and her daughter, Agnes. The young lady loves a youthful doctor, but a match is frustrated by the mother, who seeks to marry the daughter to the highest bidder. The mother's extravagance ruins the father, who, being in ill health, succumbs to heart failure. With poverty staring them in the face, the mother takes Agnes abroad, finally forcing her into a marriage with an Australian millionaire. To do so, the mother intercepts all letters between Agnes and the young doctor, with the result that each feels that the other has ceased to care.The millionaire and his young wife, while on their honeymoon on his yacht, are shipwrecked. He is dealt a terrible blow on the head, and it completely destroys his memory.

The young wife is saved and returns to America, while her husband is picked up by a French fisherman. His memory gone, he does not recall his previous existence in America, Agnes and the doctor renew their love affair and finally marry, excellent proof having been furnished that her former husband had drowned in the shipwreck. There is no opposition to the marriage now, as the mother also had perished in the catastrophe. Five years later, the young doctor has become a famous brain specialist. To him, Agnes' former husband comes for an operation in the hope of restoring his lost memory. The two men, never having met, fail to learn they are both married to the same woman. She discovers it, however, and with her happiness at stake, does not tell her surgeon-husband the truth, but attempts to dissuade him from operating on her first husband, fearful that the operation will prove successful and her first husband regain his lost memory and recognize her as his wife. The humanity in the surgeon surmounts his wife's pleas, but the patient fails to withstand the operation and Agnes' happiness is assured, despite the terrible situations which confronted her."

== Cast ==
- Anita Stewart as Agnes Belgradin
- E.K. Lincoln as Loring Brent
- Julia Swayne Gordon as Mrs. Belgradin
- Charles Kent as Sidney Belgradin
- Gladden James as Harry Furniss

uncredited

- Donald Hall as French Artist
- Harry T. Morey as Geoffrey Marshe
- Kate Price as Squires
- George Stevens as Sharp
