= Her Choice (1912 film) =

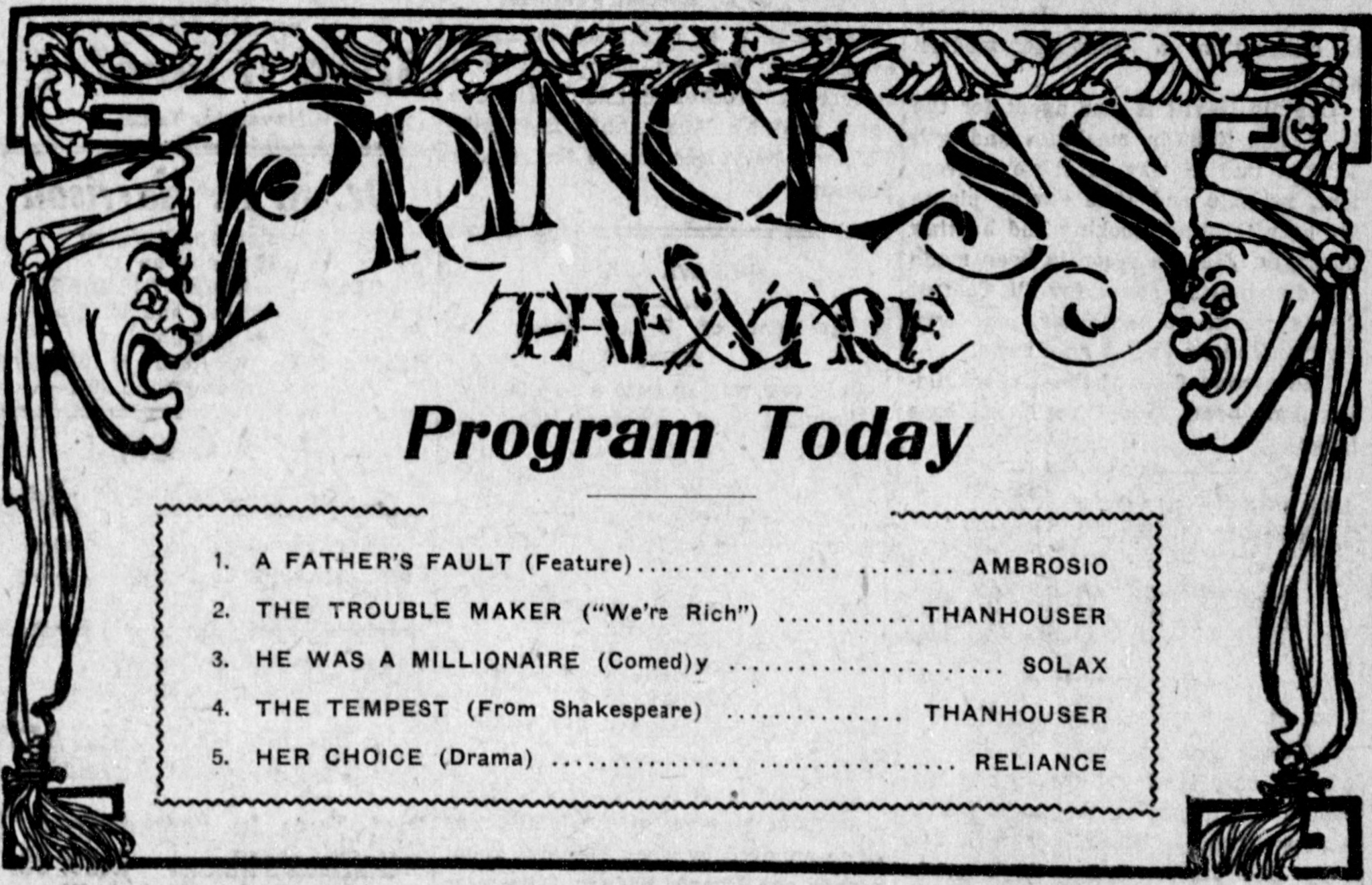
- A newspaper advertisement for several films, including Her Choice
- Directed by: Ralph Ince
- Written by: Beta Breuil
- Starring: Anita Stewart
- Distributed by: Vitagraph
- Release date: September 30, 1912
- Country: United States
- Languages: Silent; English intertitles

Her Choice is an American silent film. It has been cited as the first film of actress Anita Stewart.

== Cast ==
- Zena Keefe as Edith, the Poor Niece
- Anna M. Stewart as May, the Vain Niece
- Julia Swayne Gordon as Mrs. Leticia Summers, the Aunt
- Mary Maurice as May's Mother
- Rose Tapley as Edith's Mother

== Production ==
At the time she appeared in this film, Anita Stewart was making $25.00 a week as an extra at Vitagraph.

== Release ==
Her Choice was released in the United States on September 30, 1912, and was still in circulation on both coasts in early November.

== Preservation ==
A 16mm print of Her Choice has been preserved by the Museum of Modern Art.
