= Three Faces East (1926 film) =

1926 film by Rupert Julian

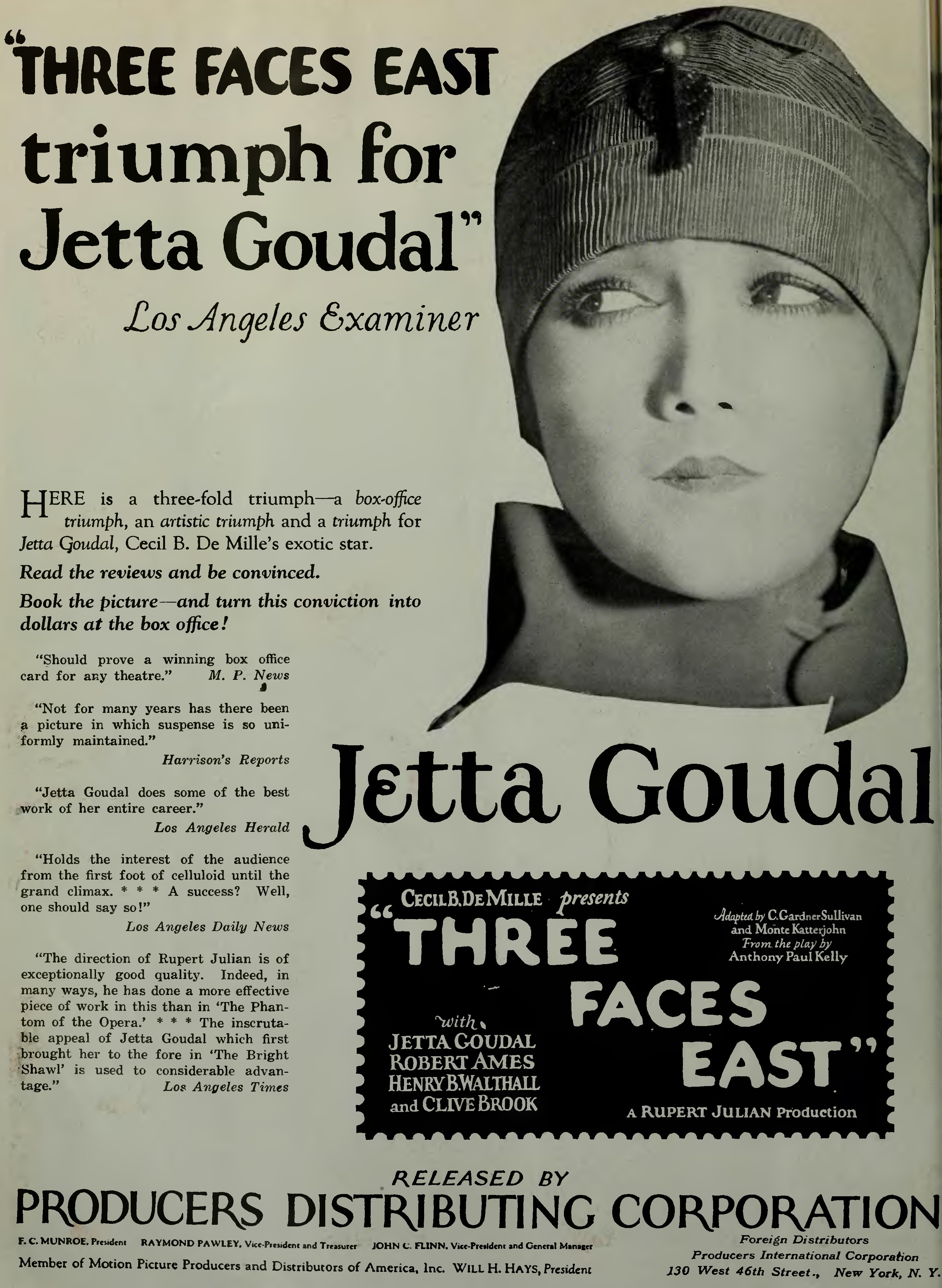
- Directed by: Rupert Julian
- Written by: C. Gardner Sullivan (scenario); Monte Katterjohn (scenario)
- Based on: Three Faces East by Anthony Paul Kelly
- Produced by: Cecil B. DeMille
- Starring: Jetta Goudal; Robert Ames; Clive Brook
- Cinematography: J. Peverell Marley
- Edited by: Claude Berkeley
- Music by: Hugo Riesenfeld
- Production company: Cinema Corporation of America
- Distributed by: Producers Distributing Corporation
- Release date: February 3, 1926
- Running time: Seven reels (7,419 feet)
- Country: United States
- Language: Silent (English intertitles)

Three Faces East is a 1926 American silent drama film directed by Rupert Julian and starring Jetta Goudal and Clive Brook. It is based on a popular 1918 Broadway play by Anthony Paul Kelly about spies during World War I. It was remade under the same title as a sound film in 1930, and in 1940 under the title British Intelligence starring Boris Karloff. The story's action takes place in France and Great Britain.

== Plot ==
As described in a film magazine review, while a German prisoner, British aviator Frank Bennett is nursed back to health by Fraulein Marks, who is really Helen Hawtree of the British Intelligence Service. She reaches England and is sent to the Bennett house to watch for Bolke, a German spy, who turns up as the servant Valdar. Helen falls in love with him but remains true to her country. They go to a cellar that is equipped with a radio, Frank arrives and during a fight Boelke is shot. After the war, Frank looks forward to a happy future with Helen. A highlight of the film is an attack on London by German Zeppelin airships and the British defensive anti-aircraft fire.

== Cast ==
- Jetta Goudal as Miss Hawtree / Fraulein Marks
- Robert Ames as Frank Bennett
- Henry B. Walthall as George Bennett
- Clive Brook as Valdar (Boelke)
- Edythe Chapman as Mrs. Bennett
- Clarence Burton as John Ames
- Ed Brady as Firking
- Rupert Julian as The Kaiser (uncredited)

== Preservation ==
This film is listed as surviving at the Centre national du cinéma et de l'image animée archives in Bois d'Arcy, France.

== See also ==
- Three Faces East (1930)
- British Intelligence (1940)
