= Two Kinds of Women (1922 film) =

1922 film

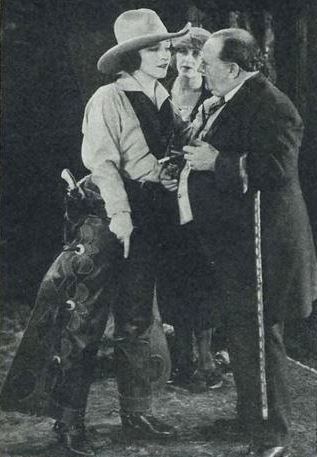
- Still with Pauline Frederick, on page 125 of the April 1922 Dramatic Mirror.
- Directed by: Colin Campbell
- Written by: Winifred Dunn
- Based on: Judith of Blue Lake Ranch by Jackson Gregory
- Produced by: Robertson-Cole
- Starring: Pauline Frederick
- Cinematography: Devereaux Jennings
- Distributed by: Film Booking Offices of America
- Release date: January 22, 1922
- Running time: 6 reels
- Country: United States
- Languages: Silent; English intertitles

Two Kinds of Women is a 1922 American silent Western film directed by Colin Campbell and starring Pauline Frederick. It is based on the novel Judith of Blue Lake Ranch by Jackson Gregory. Robertson-Cole produced the film and distribution was through Film Booking Offices of America.

== Plot ==
As described in a film magazine, Judith Sanford is the proprietress of the large Blue Lake Ranch that is the subject of a business feud between two rival factions. Judy maintains possession through the loyalty of Old Carson and Bud Lee, her foreman, and they thwart the efforts of Bayne Trevor and his gang to demoralize the ranch hands to require the selling of the property. Judy holds a dance at the ranch where everyone is expected to be in full dress, and the cowboys use mail order to ensure they are fully equipped for the event. Trevor's gang holds up and robs the paymaster of Judy's ranch, but Bud Lee obtains other money in time so that the men can be paid. He then proceeds to hunt the thief and eventually finds that it is one of Trevor's men. This results in several realistic fistfights.

== Cast ==
- Pauline Frederick as Judith Sanford
- Tom Santschi as Bud Lee
- Charles Clary as Bayne Trevor
- Dave Winter as Pollock Hampton
- Eugene Pallette as Old Carson
- Billy Elmer as Poker face
- Jack Curtis as Chris Quinnion
- Jim Barley as Benny
- Sam Appel as Crowdy
- Clarissa Selwynne as Mrs. Grimley
- Otis Harlan as Major Langworthy
- Jean Calhoun as Marcia Langworthy
- Tom Bates as Jose
- Lydia Yeamans Titus as Mrs Simpson
- Frank Clark as Dr. Tripp
- Bud Sterling as Tommy Burkitt
- Elise Collins as Maid

== Preservation ==
In February of 2021, Two Kinds of Women was cited by the National Film Preservation Board on their Lost U.S. Silent Feature Films list and is therefore presumed lost.
