= Straight from the Shoulder =

Straight from the Shoulder may refer to:

- Straight from the Shoulder (TV program), a Philippine television program
- Straight from the Shoulder (1936 film), a 1936 American film
- Straight from the Shoulder (1921 film), a lost 1921 silent film western
