= Oath-Bound =

1922 film by Bernard Durning

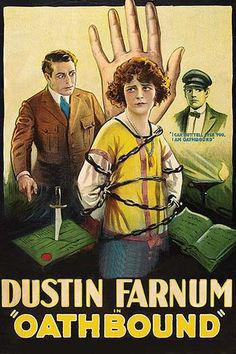
- Directed by: Bernard J. Durning
- Written by: Edward LeSaint; John Stone
- Starring: Dustin Farnum; Ethel Grey Terry; Fred Thomson
- Cinematography: Don Short
- Production company: Fox Film
- Distributed by: Fox Film
- Release date: August 13, 1922
- Running time: 50 minutes
- Country: United States
- Language: Silent (English intertitles)

Oath-Bound is a lost 1922 American silent drama film directed by Bernard J. Durning and starring Dustin Farnum, Ethel Grey Terry, and Fred Thomson.

== Cast ==
- Dustin Farnum as Lawrence Bradbury
- Ethel Grey Terry as Constance Hastings
- Fred Thomson as Jim Bradbury
- Maurice 'Lefty' Flynn as Ned Hastings
- Norman Selby as Hicks
- Aileen Pringle as Alice
- Bob Perry as Gang Leader
- Herschel Mayall as Captain Steele

== Bibliography ==
- Solomon, Aubrey. The Fox Film Corporation, 1915-1935: A History and Filmography. McFarland, 2011.
