= Bernard Durning =

American silent film actor (1893–1923)

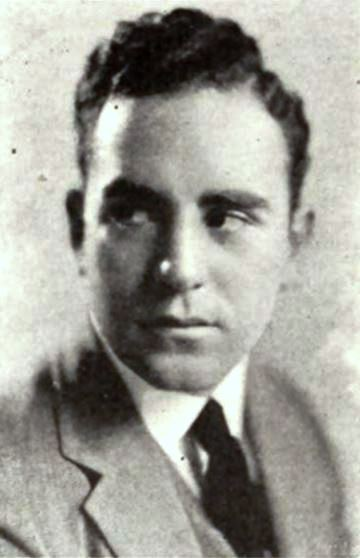
- Durning in 1920
- Born: Bernard Joseph Durning; August 24, 1893; New York City, US
- Died: August 29, 1923 (aged 30); New York City, US
- Occupation: Silent film director
- Years active: Shirley Mason (m.1917-1923; his death)

Bernard Joseph Durning (August 24, 1893 – August 29, 1923) was an American silent film director and actor who worked primarily with Lon Chaney, Dustin Farnum, and Buck Jones.

William A. Wellman was his assistant director and protégé. His older brother, Harry M. Durning, was the Collector of Customs for the Port of New York from 1933 to 1953.

== Personal life ==
Bernard J. Durning was born on August 24, 1892, in New York City, US. He was married to Shirley Mason. He died on August 29, 1923, in New York City.

== Film career ==
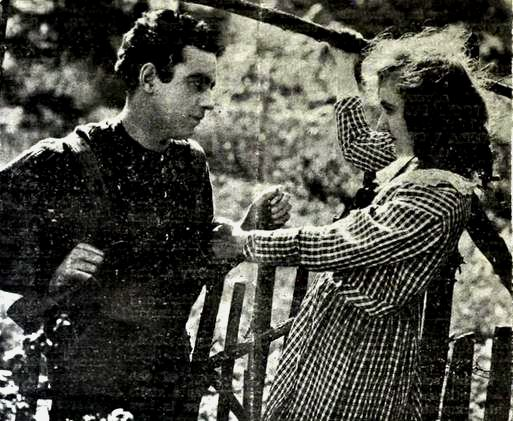
Bernard Durning and Vangie Valentine in When Bearcat Went Dry (1919)

Bernard Durning began at Edison Studios in the Bronx, in 1912, after attending Fordham University. He rose through the ranks of the studio as assistant to Charles Brabin and John H. Collins. He was Production Manager at Edison for three years. He stood six foot six and is recognizable in a film still of a Stock Market scene of a 1912 Edison film which appears on page 33 in HOLLYWOOD The Pioneers by Kevin Brownlow as the face directly below the podium. William A. Wellman said that "Bernie Durning ...was the handsomest guy I've ever seen in my life."

The years of studio training made Bernard Durning a master of technique, acquainted with every angle of filmmaking. Even in his directorial debut at Edison Studios he "invented and carried into execution an entirely new idea in the lighting of night scenes in 'Aliens'. Some very fine silhouette effects were the result..." Aliens was written by Durning and starred his wife, Shirley Mason, as Kiku San, a Japanese girl. It was released as The Unwritten Code in 1919 and was the last film ever made by Edison Studios. "I guess we broke 'em!" Durning quipped.

Durning first met Shirley Mason when he rescued her from a train wreck scene at Edison. Shirley was only five feet tall and had passed out from the smoke pots. "My heart began to pound like everything when I saw who had rescued me!" Shirley said. Both Shirley and her sister, Viola Dana, had been child stars on Broadway in The Poor Little Rich Girl. Their real last name was Flugrath and a third sister, Edna Flugrath, also starred in films at Edison and each married their director. Edna accompanied Harold Shaw, who had directed her in Edison's The Land Beyond the Sunset (1912), to the UK as one of the two principal directors at the London Film Company with George Loane Tucker, and they finally wed when he was brought to South Africa in 1917, where the couple made three films, including The Rose of Rhodesia (1918), the first film to star actual Africans of color. Viola married John Collins, who directed her in The Cossack Whip (1917) and the still extant Blue Jeans (1917).

Durning and Mason both worked for Fox Studios on the corner of Sunset and Western in Hollywood, California, starting in 1920. They were called "The Most-Devoted Couple in Hollywood." Viola Dana worked for Metro Studios where she met Buster Keaton who became one of the family. "Buster was the original man who came to dinner. He came home one night with Shirley and Bernie and stayed for three years," Viola told Kevin Brownlow.

Durning was a top director of action-packed melodramas starring Dustin Farnum and Buck Jones when William Wellman became his assistant director in 1921. Wellman called his two years with Durning "the greatest school a director ever had." "Wild Bill" Wellman and "Big Bernie" Durning had wild adventures making movies, such as their film company's fight with lumberjacks up in Eureka, California, which William A. Wellman, Jr. describes in The Man and His Wings. In Wild Bill: Hollywood Maverick by Todd Robinson, Wellman biographer Frank T. Thompson theorizes that Wellman may have based his 1937 classic A Star Is Born on his own relationship with Durning. Wild Bill: Hollywood Maverick "Quite frankly, he was my God." Wellman declared of Durning.

Durning also taught Wellman a valuable lesson about true love in Hollywood. "Keep your chasing out of the business entirely," Durning told Wellman of "this fakey love nest". It was his second Cardinal rule after Loyalty. When Big Bernie caught Wild Bill in the arms of the starlette of their picture in Buck Jones' dressing room, he proceeded to beat the heck out of him. Wellman then adds how Jack Dempsey, the boxing Heavyweight Champion, and Durning were great friends who used to "knock the heck out of each other in Tom Mix's handball court...Durning stood up to Dempsey." Wellman put what he had learned from Durning to practical use when he finally found his true love in the form of a Busby Berkeley dancer named Dorothy Coonan whom he married and had six children. "I was still a champion of the Bernie Durning system. I had learned that long-ago lesson well." Robert Mitchum mirrored this advice in an interview with People in 1983 while filming Winds of War: "I always took the advice of [director] William Wellman: 'keep your ---- out of the business.'" Robert Mitchum, People, 1983

Bernard Durning also starred as the leading man in four films directed by Oliver L. Sellers--When Bearcat Went Dry (1919), The Gift Supreme (1920), both with Lon Chaney as his nemesis, and Diane of Star Hollow (1921). Dick Grace the stuntman describes working on two of Durning's films in his book Squadron Of Death, The Eleventh Hour (1923) and The Fast Mail (1922). In the latter, Buck Jones was severely burned when someone tried dousing him with a pail of gasoline, thinking that it was water. Adolphe Menjou called it "the action picture to end all action pictures" which nearly ended the entire cast. Menjou put the blame on "Wild Willie Wellman." "Let's just say, 'we played rough.'" Wellman wrote in his autobiography, A Short Time For Insanity. It was during the filming of The Eleventh Hour that Durning went on a drinking binge and told Wellman to direct it for him. "It's all yours, Willie." When Sol Wurtzel and Winfield Sheehan, the Fox Studio heads, saw the finished film, Durning confessed and told them to make Wellman a director. "Dusty (Dustin Farnum) is nuts about him and so am I!"

== Marriage ==
Durning married silent film actress Shirley Mason on June 19, 1917. The union was happy and they stayed married for six years until his premature death on August 29, 1923.

== Death and aftermath ==
Durning was directing a big special for Fox, called Around The Town, starring Gallagher and Shean in the summer of 1923 when he drank some bad water in Brooklyn and got typhoid fever. He died in St. Vincent's Hospital in Manhattan, with Shirley Mason by his side. "The Heart of Hollywood is Broken" declared the Los Angeles Times.

When Bearcat Went Dry (1919) was found in 1995 and is in the Nederlands Filmmuseum. The Gift Supreme (1920) the first reel exists on film.

== Filmography ==
- The Stock Market Edison Film (1912) (actor)
- The Unwritten Code (1919) (writer, director)
- Blackie's Redemption (1919) (actor) Directed by John Ince
- When Bearcat Went Dry (1919) (leading man) Directed by Oliver L. Sellers
- The Gift Supreme (1920) (leading man) Directed by Oliver L. Sellers
- The Scoffer (1920) (actor) Directed by Alan Dwan
- Seeds of Vengeance (1920) (actor) Directed by Oliver L. Sellers.
- Diane of Star Hollow (1921) (leading man) Directed by Oliver L. Sellers
- The Devil Within (1921) (actor, director)
- The Primal Law (1921) (director)
- Partners of Fate (1921) (director)
- The One Man Trail (1921) (director)
- Straight from the Shoulder (1921) (director)
- To a Finish (1921) (director)
- While Justice Waits (1922) (director)
- The Yosemite Trail (1922) (director)
- Iron to Gold (1922) (director)
- Oath-Bound (1922) (director)
- Strange Idols (1922) (director)
- The Fast Mail (1922) (director)
- The Eleventh Hour (1923) (director) Directed by William A. Wellman
- Around The Town (1923) (unfinished direction)
- The Arizona Express (1924) (A Bernard J. Durning Production)
- Wild Bill: Hollywood Maverick (documentary, photo of Wellman and Durning)
