= Ollie Sellers =

American film director

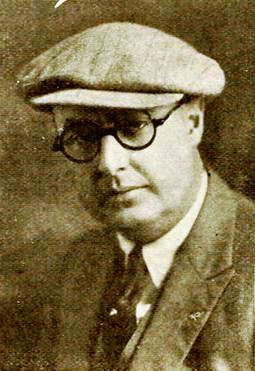
- Sellers in 1919
- Born: Oliver Sellers; 1885
- Occupation: Film director

Ollie L. Sellers (born Oliver Sellers in 1885) was an American film director. Before becoming a director he was a production manager at Triangle Film Corporation. He worked with Gloria Swanson. He wrote the screenplay adapted from a novel and directed the 1920 film The Gift Supreme.

== Pro-union films ==
Sellers directed the pro-union film The New Disciple in 1921 produced by labor organization the Federal Film Corporation in Seattle. It was the most widely viewed labor film of the period, with an audience of more than one million people the year of its release. The film featured Alfred Allen, Norris Johnson, and Pell Trenton. The silent film included titles from Woodrow Wilson's 1913 New Freedom and told the story of a war veteran and a corrupt capitalist war profiteer. It was an anti-open shop film and an indictment of the American plan. Promotions for the film called for union members to "wait" on their film exchanges to show the film. Film production was supervised by John Arthur Nelson who wrote the story which was published at the same time as the film release.

== Personal life ==
Sellers married Camille Compton in 1907 and had one daughter Dorothy. His wife Camille died in 1916 at the age of 31.

Sellers married a "Mrs. Dunnington" in San Francisco in July 1919.

== Filmography ==
- The Abandoned Well (1913)
- When Bearcat Went Dry (1919)
- Whom the Gods Destroy (1919), as producer, a League of Nations themed film
- Seeds of Vengeance (1920)
- The Gift Supreme (1920)
- The New Disciple (1921)
- Diane of Star Hollow (1921)
- The Ableminded Lady (1922)
- The Hoosier Schoolmaster (1924)
