= Sea God =

Sea God may refer to:

- Any of various water deities
- The Sea God, a 1930 American film
- Emperor of the Sea (Korean: 해신; lit. 'Sea God'), a South Korean television drama series
