= Margaret Prescott Montague =

American novelist (1878–1955)

- Born: November 29, 1878; White Sulphur Springs, West Virginia
- Died: September 26, 1955 (aged 76); Richmond, Virginia
- Occupation: Writer (novelist)
- Writing career
- Period: 20th century
- Genre: Fiction

Margaret Prescott (or Preston) Montague (29 November 1878 – 26 September 1955) was an American short story writer, and novelist. Her middle name is sometimes attributed as Preston before changing to Prescott.

Her work appeared in Harper's among other places.

Her novels were adapted into the films Linda (1929), Calvert's Valley (1922), Uncle Sam of Freedom Ridge (1920) and Seeds of Vengeance (1920) from The Sowing of Alderson Cree.

== Awards ==
- 1919 O. Henry Award

== Works ==
- Deep channel. Atlantic Monthly Press. 1923.
- Twenty Minutes of Reality. Atlantic Monthly Press. 1916.
- The Sowing of Alderson Cree. The Baker & Taylor company. 1907. "Margaret Prescott Montague."
- In Calvert's Valley. The Baker & Taylor Company. 1908. (reprint. Kessinger Publishing, LLC. 2007. ISBN 978-0-548-25964-1.)
- Closed doors: studies of deaf and blind children. Houghton Mifflin Company. 1915. "Margaret Prescott Montague."
- Of water and the Spirit. E.P. Dutton & Company. 1916.
- "On Authors". Atlantic classics. Atlantic Monthly Press. 1918. p. 124. "Margaret Prescott Montague."
- Uncle Sam of Freedom Ridge. Doubleday, Page & Company. 1920. "Margaret Prescott Montague."
- England to America. Doubleday, Page & Company. 1920.
- Up Eel River. The Macmillan company. 1928.

=== Stories ===
- "The Will to Go". The Atlantic monthly. Vol. 127. Atlantic Monthly Co. 1921.
- "Why It Was W-On-The-Eyes". The Atlantic monthly. Vol. 111. Atlantic Monthly Co. 1913.
- Charles Swain Thomas, ed. (1918). "Of Water and the Spirit". Atlantic narratives: modern short stories. The Atlantic Monthly Press. p. 310. "Margaret Prescott Montague."
- "England to America" . O. Henry Memorial Award Prize Stories, 1919. Doubleday, Page & Company. 1920.
