= Partners of Fate =

1921 film by Bernard Dunning

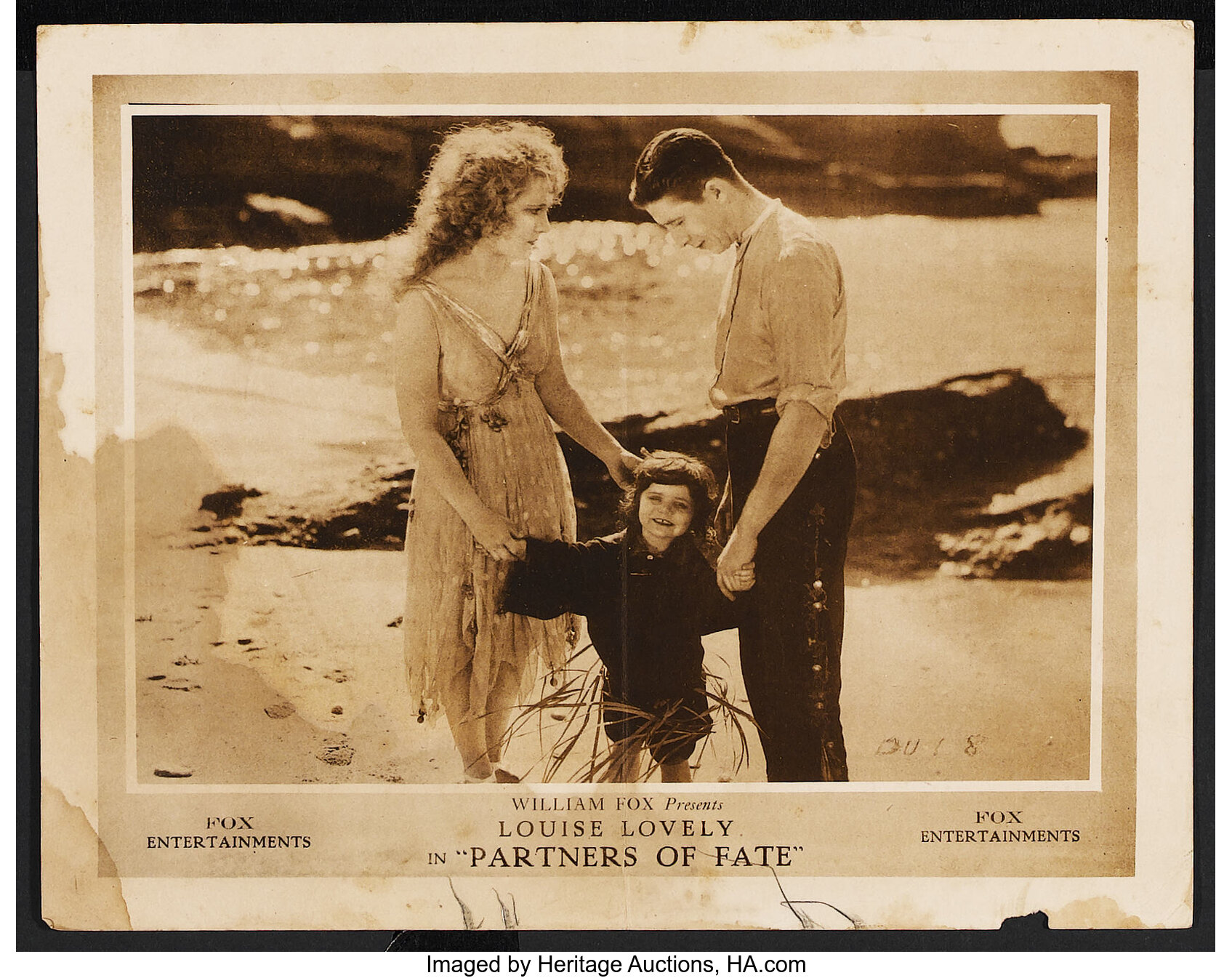
- Lobby card
- Directed by: Bernard Durning
- Screenplay by: Robert A. Dillon
- Story by: Stephen Chalmers
- Starring: Louise Lovely; William Scott; Rosemary Theby; Philo McCollough
- Cinematography: Otto Brautigan; Glenn Macwilliams
- Production company: Fox Film Corporation
- Distributed by: Fox Film Corporation
- Release date: January 1921
- Running time: 5 reels
- Country: United States
- Language: Silent (English intertitles)

Partners of Fate is a lost 1921 American silent drama film directed by Bernard Durning. It is not known whether the film currently survives.

== Plot ==
Helen Meriless is married to Byron Millard, while Frances Lloyd is married to John Fraser. Both couples are dysfunctional with Helen and John being the better partners. They all end up on the same ship for their honeymoon. The ship sinks with both couples ending up with each other's spouses on two separate islands. Frances and Byron end up cheating on their spouses with each other, while Helen and John do not break their vows. Byron and Frances are rescued, and leave their spouses. Helen and John reach civilization much later. When they do, Helen arrives at her house to find Byron and Frances living with each other, causing a panicked Frances to shoot both Byron and herself. The film ends with the now spouseless Helen and John deciding to marry each other.

== Cast ==
- Louise Lovely as Helen Meriless
- William Scott as John Fraser
- Rosemary Theby as Frances Lloyd
- Philo McCullough as Byron Millard
- George Siegmann as Purser
- Richard Cummings as Bill Ricketts

== Preservation ==
The film is currently lost.
