= Alice in Blunderland: An Iridescent Dream =

1907 novel by John Kendrick Bangs

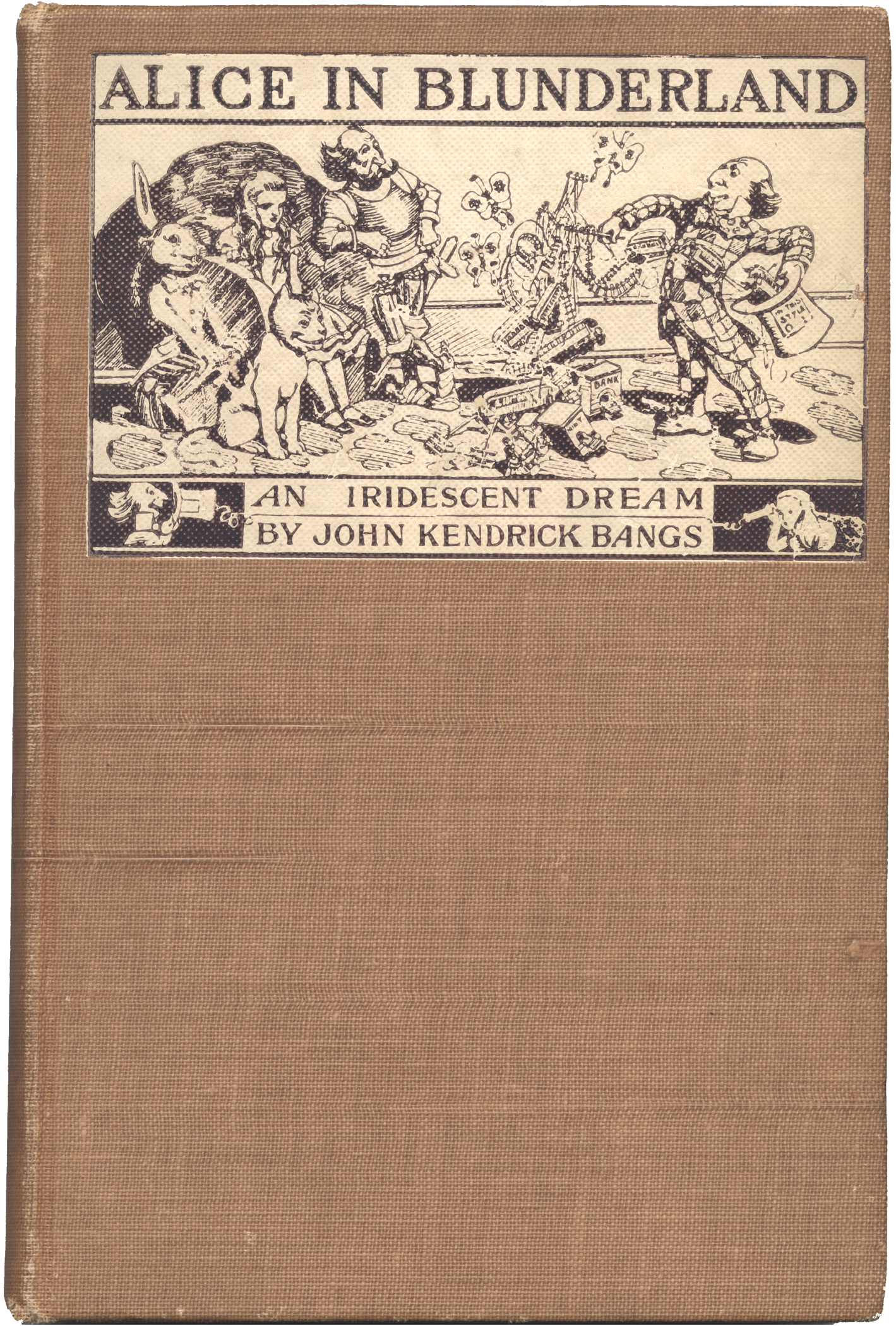
- Front cover of the first edition
- Author: John Kendrick Bangs
- Illustrator: Albert Levering
- Cover artist: Levering
- Genre: Fantasy novel, parody
- Publisher: Doubleday, Page & Co.
- Publication date: 1907
- Publication place: United States
- Pages: viii, 124
- OCLC: 191114417
- LC Class: PS1064.B3 A7 1907

Alice in Blunderland: An Iridescent Dream is a novel by John Kendrick Bangs. It was first published in 1907 by Doubleday, Page & Co. of New York, with illustrations by Albert Levering. It is a political parody of the two Alice books by Lewis Carroll, Alice's Adventures in Wonderland (1865) and Through the Looking-Glass (1871).

It is critical of collectivism and economic issues such as taxation, corporate greed, and corruption. Instead of entering Wonderland, Alice finds herself in "Blunderland", which is also described as "Municipal Ownership Country".

== Plot ==
Alice travels to Blunderland where nothing is supposed to be, children live in the Municipal House of the Children and the Duchess and the City are their parents. Familiar characters made famous by Alice in Wonderland make appearances in the book, including the dormouse, the Mad Hatter, the Cheshire Cat and others.

== Publication history ==
Alice in Blunderland: An Iridescent Dream was published in book form in 1907. Part of Alice in Blunderland was previously published as "Alice in Municipaland" in Concerning Municipal Ownership, vol. 1 no. 10 (December 1906), pp. 182–87. The book features line drawings by Albert Levering (1869–1929), after the original Alice illustrations by John Tenniel.

In 1902, Bangs had written a book inspired by Alice's Adventures in Wonderland, called Rollo in Emblemland.
