= The Eleventh Hour (1923 film) =

1923 film

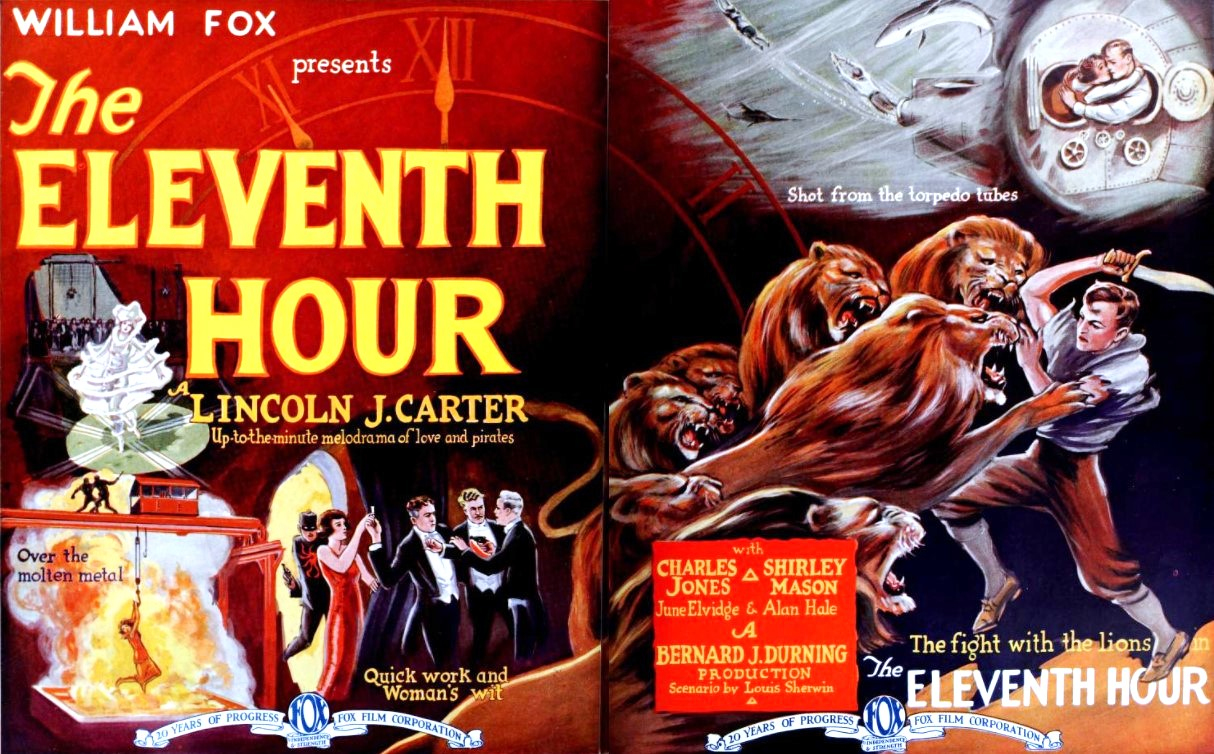
- Advertisement for The Eleventh Hour from Film Daily, July 8, 1923.
- Directed by: Bernard Durning
- Screenplay by: Louis Sherwin
- Based on: The Eleventh Hour by Lincoln J. Carter
- Starring: Shirley Mason; Buck Jones; Richard Tucker; Alan Hale Sr. Walter McGrail; June Elvidge
- Cinematography: Don Short
- Production company: Fox Film Corporation
- Distributed by: Fox Film Corporation
- Release date: July 20, 1923
- Running time: 70 minutes
- Country: United States
- Languages: Silent; English intertitles

The Eleventh Hour is a lost 1923 American melodrama action film directed by Bernard Durning and written by Louis Sherwin. The film stars Shirley Mason, Buck Jones, Richard Tucker, Alan Hale Sr., Walter McGrail and June Elvidge. The film was released on July 20, 1923, by Fox Film Corporation.

== Plot ==
Wanting to take over the world, the mad and evil Prince Stefan de Bernie plots to acquire a new explosive developed at a plant owned by Barbara Hackett. Prince Stefan uses blackmail to get Barbara's uncle and the dishonest business executive Herbert Glenville — a man who would like to marry Barbara — to cooperate with him. Meanwhile, Brick McDonald, an employee of Prince Stefan's, wins Barbara's confidence. After a number of adventures involving wild chases in motorboats, airplanes, and submarines, fights with lions, and rescuing Barbara from being lowered into a pit of molten steel, McDonald foils Prince Stefan's plans. McDonald then reveals that he is actually the chief of the United States Secret Service.

== Cast ==
- Shirley Mason as Barbara Hackett
- Buck Jones as Brick McDonald
- Richard Tucker as Herbert Glenville
- Alan Hale Sr. as Prince Stefan de Bernie
- Walter McGrail as Dick Manley
- June Elvidge as Estelle Hackett
- Fred Kelsey as The Submarine Commander
- Nigel De Brulier as Mordecai Newman
- Fred Kohler as Barbara's Uncle

== Production ==
The film was based on the unpublished and uncopyrighted play The Eleventh Hour by Lincoln J. Carter.

Between February 26 and March 2, 1923, Twentieth Century Fox used the United States Navy submarine USS R-6 in filming The Eleventh Hour.
