= The New Disciple =

1921 American silent film

- Directed by: Ollie Sellers
- Written by: William Pigott (scenario); John Arthur Nelson (story)
- Produced by: Federation Film Corp.
- Starring: Pell Trenton
- Release date: April 1922
- Running time: 6-7 reels
- Country: United States
- Language: Silent (English intertitles)

The New Disciple is a 1921 American silent film directed by Ollie Sellers and produced by labor organization the Federal Film Corporation in Seattle, Washington. The film held its New York premiere on December 18, 1921 and was released the following spring.

It was the most widely viewed labor film of this period, with over one million viewers in the year of its release. The film featured Alfred Allen, Norris Johnson, and Pell Trenton. The film included titles from Woodrow Wilson's 1913 New Freedom and told the story of a war veteran and a corrupt capitalist war profiteer. Ollie Sellers directed the anti-open shop film which was an indictment of the American plan. Promotions for the film called for union members to "wait" on their film exchanges to show the film. Film production was supervised by John Arthur Nelson who wrote the story which was published at the same time. William Piggott wrote the screenplay. The film was made in Los Angeles.

== Cast ==
- Pell Trenton as John McPherson
- Margaret Mann as Marion Fanning
- Alfred Allen as Peter Fanning
- Norris Johnson as Mary Fanning
- Walt Whitman as Sandy McPherson
- Arthur Stuart Hull as Frederick Wharton
- Alice H. Smith as Mother McPherson
- Walter E. Perkins as Daddy Whipple
- Charles Prindley as Jennings

== Preservation ==
The New Disciple is currently presumed lost. In February of 2021, the film was cited by the National Film Preservation Board on their Lost U.S. Silent Feature Films list.
