= Calvert's Valley =

1922 silent film

- Directed by: John Francis Dillon
- Written by: Margaret Prescott Montague (novel); Jules Furthman
- Produced by: William Fox
- Starring: John Gilbert; Sylvia Breamer; Philo McCullough
- Cinematography: Don Short
- Production company: Fox Film
- Distributed by: Fox Film
- Release date: October 8, 1922
- Running time: 50 minutes
- Country: United States
- Languages: Silent; English intertitles

Calvert's Valley is a 1922 American silent drama film directed by John Francis Dillon and starring John Gilbert, Sylvia Breamer and Philo McCullough.

== Cast ==
- John Gilbert as Page Emlyn
- Sylvia Breamer as Hester Rymal
- Philo McCullough as James Calvert / Eugene Calvert
- Herschel Mayall as Judge Rymal
- Lule Warrenton as The Widow Crowcroft

== Preservation ==
With no prints of Calvert's Valley located in any film archives, it is considered a lost film.

== Bibliography ==
- Solomon, Aubrey. The Fox Film Corporation, 1915-1935: A History and Filmography. McFarland, 2011.
