= Iron to Gold =

1922 film

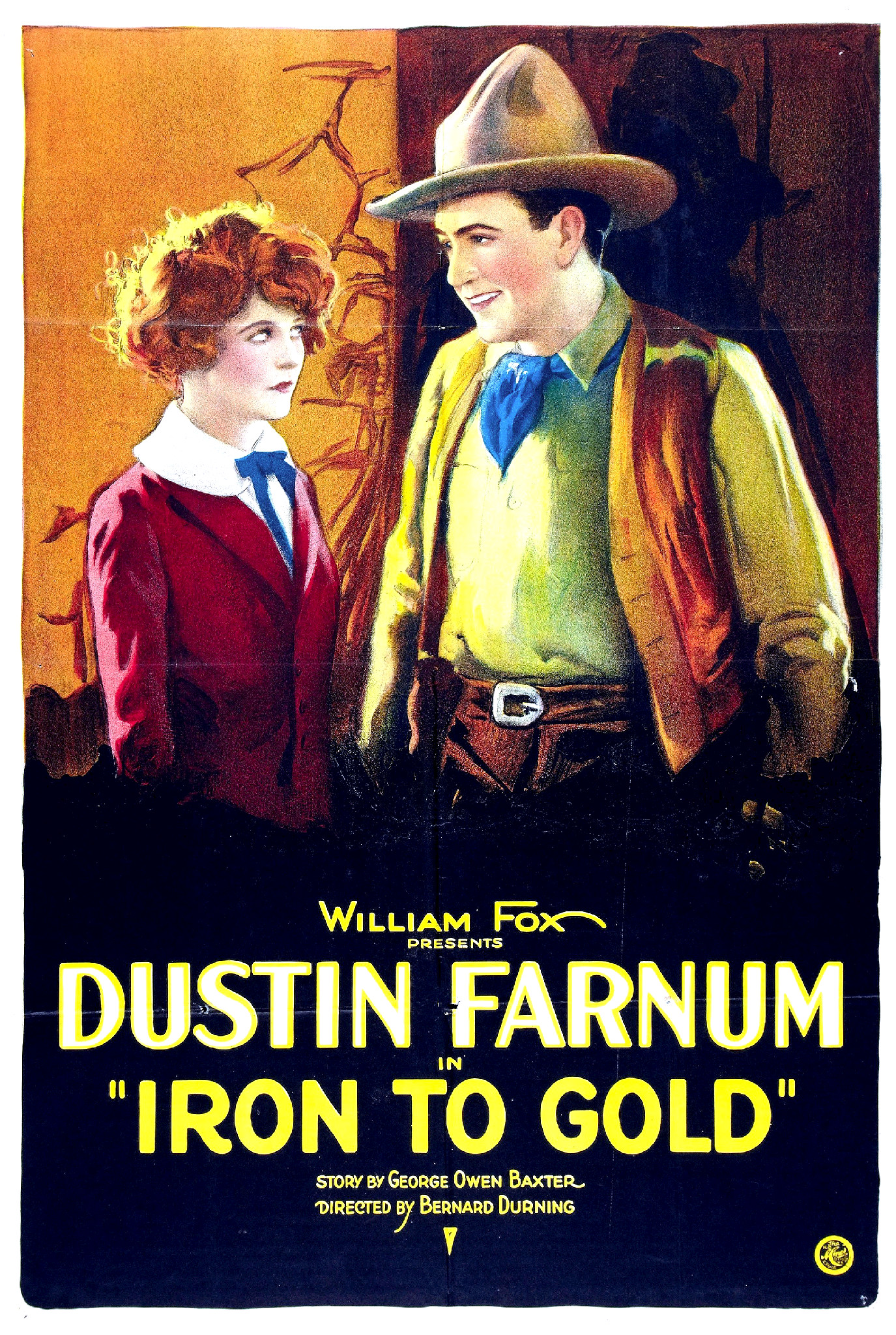
- Film poster
- Directed by: Bernard J. Durning
- Written by: Max Brand (story); John Stone
- Produced by: William Fox
- Starring: Dustin Farnum; Marguerite Marsh
- Cinematography: Don Short (aka Donovan Short)
- Distributed by: Fox Film Corporation
- Release date: March 12, 1922
- Running time: 50 minutes; 5 reels,
- Country: United States
- Languages: Silent; English intertitles

Iron to Gold is a lost 1922 American silent Western film produced and distributed by Fox Film Corporation. Based on a short story by Max Brand, writing as George Owen Baxter, the film starred Dustin Farnum and was directed by Bernard J. Durning.

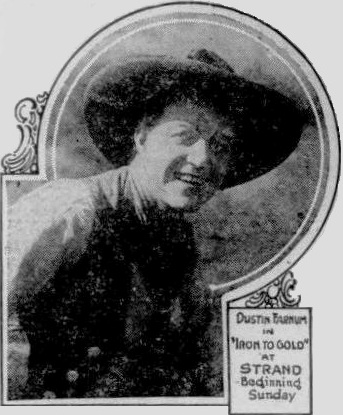
Newspaper ad.

== Plot ==
As described in a film magazine, rough, big-hearted miner Tom Curtis (Farnum) discovers that his partner George Kirby (Conklin) has been robbing him and shoots him in a fight. Tom then escapes to the mountains and becomes an outlaw to avoid any unmerited prison sentence. Later Anne Kirby (Marsh) and her husband Tom go west to look over the mine. Two outlaws attack them during the ride, and Anne is carried off to a cabin in the mountains. While the two outlaws fight over the possession of Anne, Tom arrives on the scene and drives them both away. He is about to accompany her back to safety when he learns that she is married to his former partner George Kirby, who had robbed him of his share in a valuable claim. One of the bandits waylays them and, after knocking out Tom, rides off with Anne. Tom shoots him but is himself severely injured. Anne nurses him in the cabin for a week where her husband George and the Sheriff (Belmore) find her, but Tom escapes. Tom then decides to give himself up. Anne, having learned the truth about her husband, leaves him. George hires a New York City gunman to kill Tom, but when George attempts to kill the gunman, the gunman kills him instead. Anne returns to her home in the east after making Tom her partner in the mining interests, and there is every reason to believe that he will soon be her partner in life, too.

== Cast ==
- Dustin Farnum as Tom Curtis
- Marguerite Marsh as Anne Kirby
- William Conklin as George Kirby
- William Elmer as Bat Piper
- Lionel Belmore as Sheriff
- Glen Cavender as Sloan
- Bob Perry as Creel (credited as Robert Perry)
- Dan Mason as Lem Baldwin, the hotel keeper
