= When Bearcat Went Dry =

1919 film

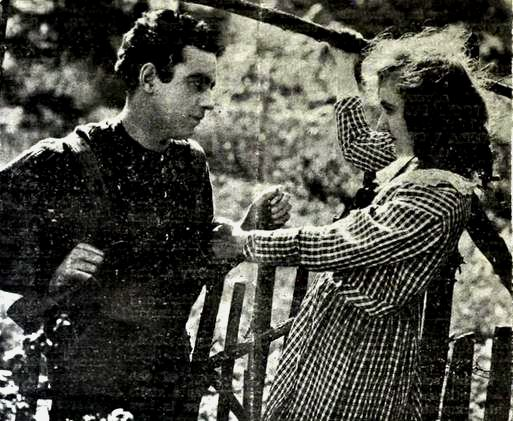
- Still with Bernard J. Durning and Vangie Valentine
- Directed by: Oliver L. Sellers
- Based on: When Bearcat Went Dry by Charles Neville Buck
- Starring: Ed Brady; Lon Chaney; Bernard J. Durning
- Cinematography: Jack MacKenzie
- Production company: Charles R. McCauley Photoplays
- Distributed by: World Film
- Release date: November 2, 1919
- Running time: 6 reels (one hour)
- Country: United States
- Language: Silent (English intertitles)

When Bearcat Went Dry is a 1919 American silent drama film directed by Oliver L. Sellers from the novel by Charles Neville Buck, and starring Lon Chaney as Kindard Powers. The title refers to a character nicknamed "Bearcat" (Bernard J. Durning) who promises his girlfriend that he will quit drinking liquor. The plot involving a promise to give up drinking was timely given the passage of the Wartime Prohibition Act, which took effect on June 30, 1919, and banned the sale of alcoholic beverages, and ratification of the Eighteenth Amendment to the United States Constitution in January of the same year.

Portions of the film were shot on location in Marlin, Kentucky.

The film was re-issued on April 20, 1928.

== Plot ==
Turner Stacy is a wild young moonshiner known as "Bearcat" living in the Cumberland Mountains of Kentucky. Bearcat falls head over heels for Blossom Fulkerson, a minister's daughter, whom he promises he will give up drinking. Bearcat's father gets arrested by revenue agents for running an illegal still and is sent to jail. Bearcat flees to Virginia for awhile to avoid having to testify against his father. When Bearcat returns home, he finds Blossom is engaged to Jerry Henderson, a young man who works for the railroad, and Bearcat develops an instant hatred for him.

A group of mountain men led by the brutish Kindard Powers attacks Jerry Henderson, mistaking him for a revenue officer. Henderson escapes them by hiding overnight in Blossom's house, which compromises the young lady's reputation in the town. Henderson is rescued by Bearcat after Powers and his men attack him a second time, but this time Henderson is fatally injured.

Bearcat forces Henderson to marry Blossom from his death bed in order to preserve her honor, but Henderson dies soon after the ceremony. Now Bearcat wants to get rid of Kindard Powers once and for all. After Bearcat's father is released from prison, Bearcat attacks and kills Powers in a fight, burns down the saloon, and the Ku Klux Klan disbands. Blossom talks of leaving town to become a schoolteacher, but she changes her mind and marries Bearcat in the end.

== Cast ==
- Bernard J. Durning as Turner "Bearcat" Stacy
- Lon Chaney as Kindard Powers
- Vangie Valentine as Blossom Fulkerson
- Millard K. Wilson as Jerry Henderson (credited as M. K. Wilson)
- Winter Hall as Lone Stacy (Bearcat's father)
- Walt Whitman as Joel Fulkerson (Blossom's father)
- Ed Brady as Rattler Webb

== Reception ==
"The picture cost $71,642.17 to make, and even the 17 cents shows on the screen." ---Wid's Daily

"Apart from the smashing exploitation possibilities on the title of this picture the production affords most excellent entertainment...This is a well directed picture interpreted by a cast of very good types. Suspense and fast action with love and pathos are combined and it will undoubtedly register heavily with the majority and completely satisfy the minority also." --- Motion Picture News.

"The production is replete with the atmosphere of the southern mountains, and presents interesting types of men...impersonated by a competent cast. ---Moving Picture World

"Besides being remarkably well directed, produced and acted, this is a picture with a big red-blooded theme...Walt Whitman, Ed Brady and Lon Chaney portray difficult character parts with remarkable art. ---Exhibitors Trade Review

== Preservation ==
It was considered to be a lost film until a print was donated to the American Film Institute from the private collection of projectionist Bill Buffum in 1996. (Another print with Dutch intertitles is said to be stored at the Netherlands Film Museum in Amsterdam minus a few titles in the first reel.)

Oddly enough, legendary silent film collector John Hampton also claimed to once own a nitrate print that was destroyed when his basement flooded.

It was believed that existing prints are that of 1928 re-issue.
