= The Yosemite Trail =

1922 film

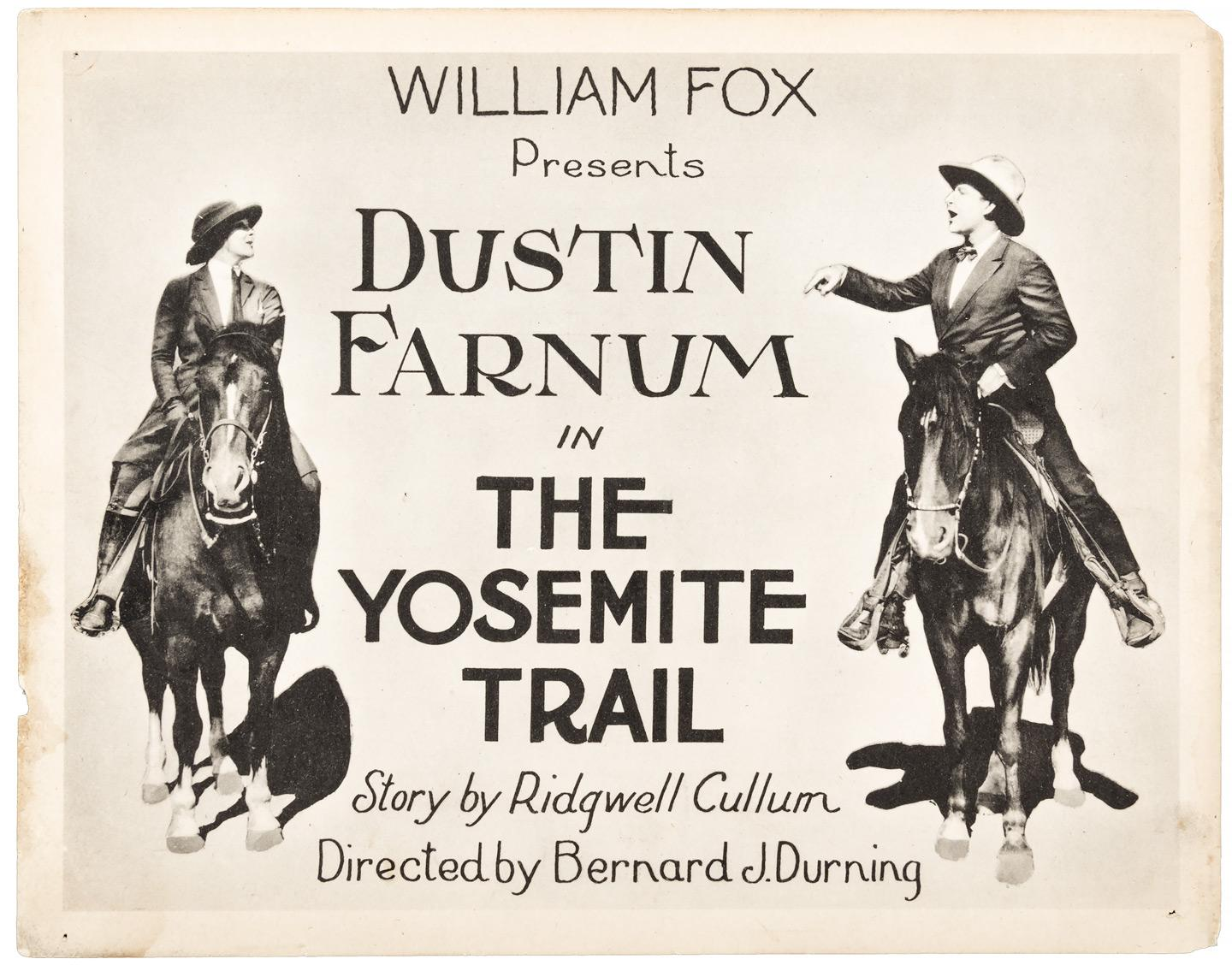
- Directed by: Bernard J. Durning
- Written by: Ridgwell Cullum (story); John Stone
- Produced by: William Fox
- Starring: Dustin Farnum; Irene Rich; Walter McGrail
- Cinematography: Don Short
- Production company: Fox Film
- Distributed by: Fox Film
- Release date: September 24, 1922
- Running time: 50 minutes
- Country: United States
- Languages: Silent; English intertitles

The Yosemite Trail is a lost 1922 American silent Western film directed by Bernard J. Durning and starring Dustin Farnum, Irene Rich and Walter McGrail.

== Cast ==
- Dustin Farnum as Jim Thorpe
- Irene Rich as Eve Marsham
- Walter McGrail as Ned Thorpe
- Frank Campeau as Jerry Smallbones
- William J. Ferguson as Peter Blunt
- Charles K. French as The Sheriff

== Bibliography ==
- Solomon, Aubrey. The Fox Film Corporation, 1915-1935: A History and Filmography. McFarland, 2011.
