= Rollo in Emblemland =

1902 novel by John Kendrick Bangs

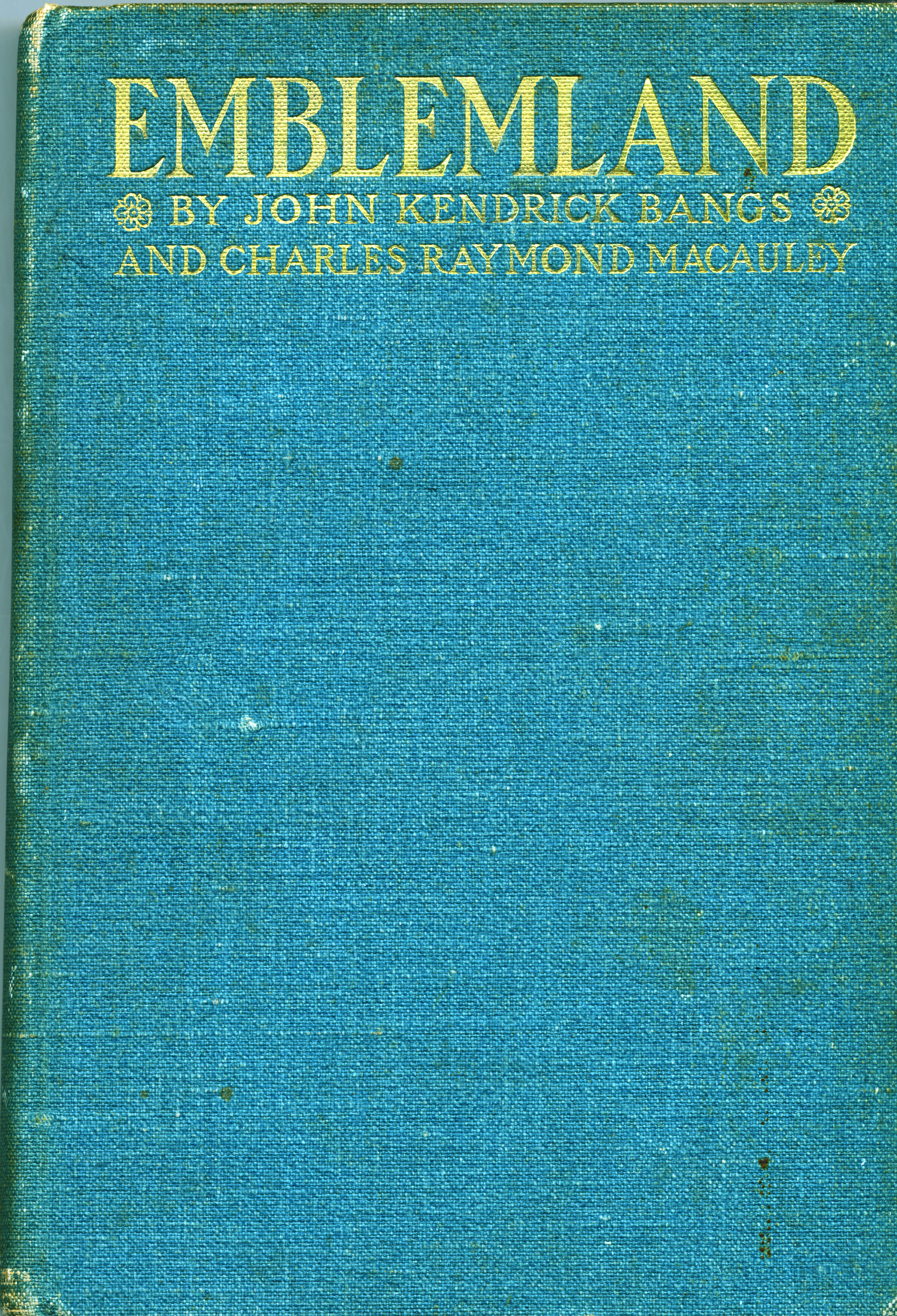
- First edition cover of Rollo in Emblemland
- Author: John Kendrick Bangs and Charles Raymond Macauley
- Language: English
- Genre: Fantasy novel, Parody
- Publisher: Doubleday, Page, & Co.
- Publication date: 1902
- Publication place: United States
- Media type: Print (hardback)
- Pages: xvi, 150

Rollo in Emblemland or Emblemland is a novel by John Kendrick Bangs, written in 1902 and published by R. H. Russell of New York. It is a tale inspired by the style of Lewis Carroll's 1865 book, Alice's Adventures in Wonderland.

In it, a young boy named Rollo falls asleep and finds himself not in Wonderland, but in "Emblemland", a place described by Cupid as "the home of all Emblems.... Emblems are signs and symbols. I'm an Emblem, because I am the symbol of love; Uncle Sam is the symbol of the United States, and John Bull is the symbol of England, and the Owl is the symbol of wisdom...."

The book features line drawings by Bang's co-author Charles Raymond Macauley

In 1907, Bangs wrote a parody of Alice's Adventures in Wonderland called Alice in Blunderland: An Iridescent Dream

2010 edition cover of Rollo in Emblemland

== Bibliography ==
- Bangs, John Kendrick (2010) Rollo in Emblemland. Evertype. ISBN 978-1-904808-58-9
