= Jaws of Steel =

1927 film by Ray Enright

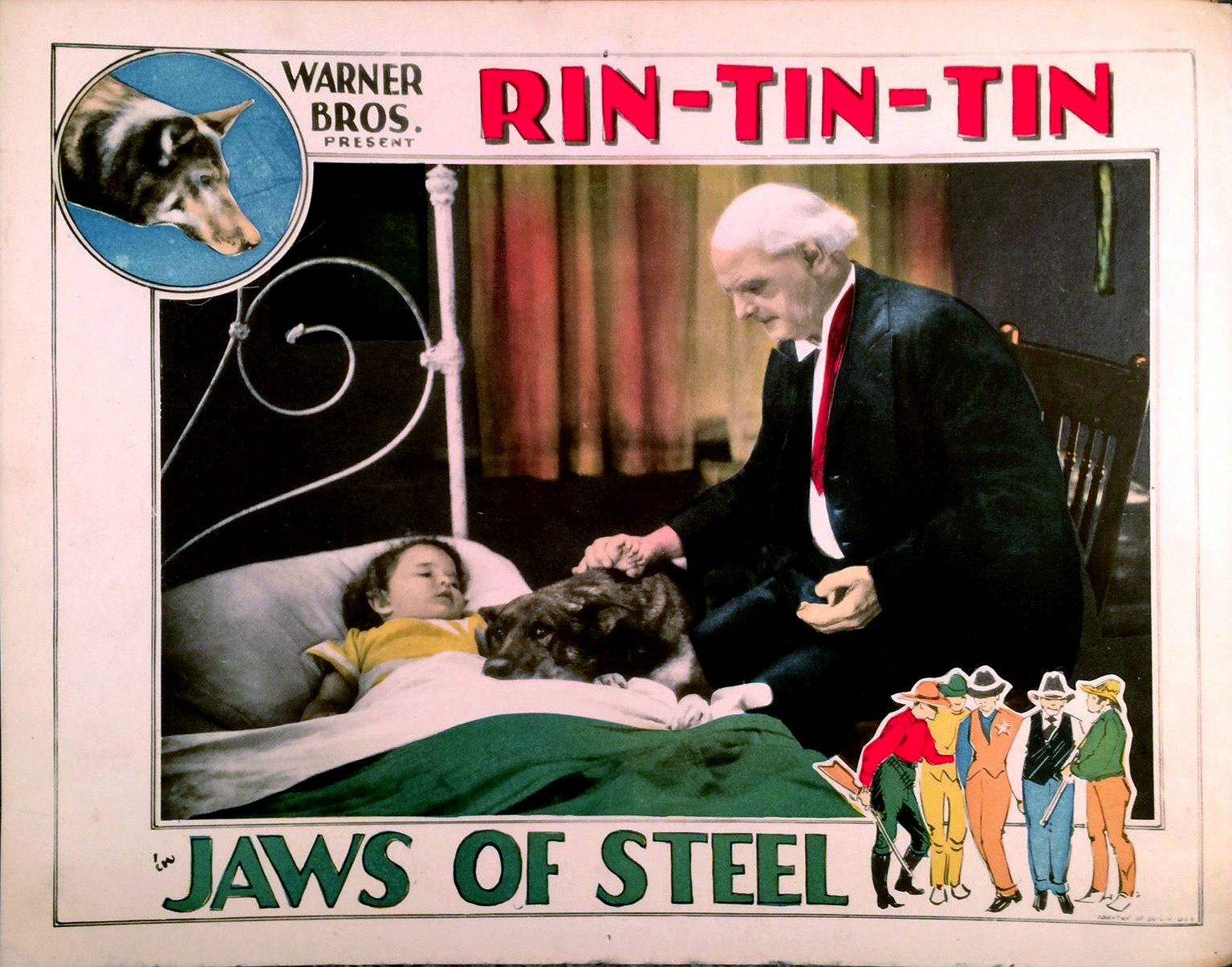
- Lobby card
- Directed by: Ray Enright
- Written by: Darryl F. Zanuck; Charles R. Condon
- Starring: Rin Tin Tin; Jason Robards; Helen Ferguson
- Cinematography: Barney McGill
- Production company: Warner Bros.
- Distributed by: Warner Bros.
- Release date: September 10, 1927
- Running time: 6 reels
- Country: United States
- Languages: Sound (Synchronized) (English Intertitles)
- Budget: $46,000
- Box office: $272,000

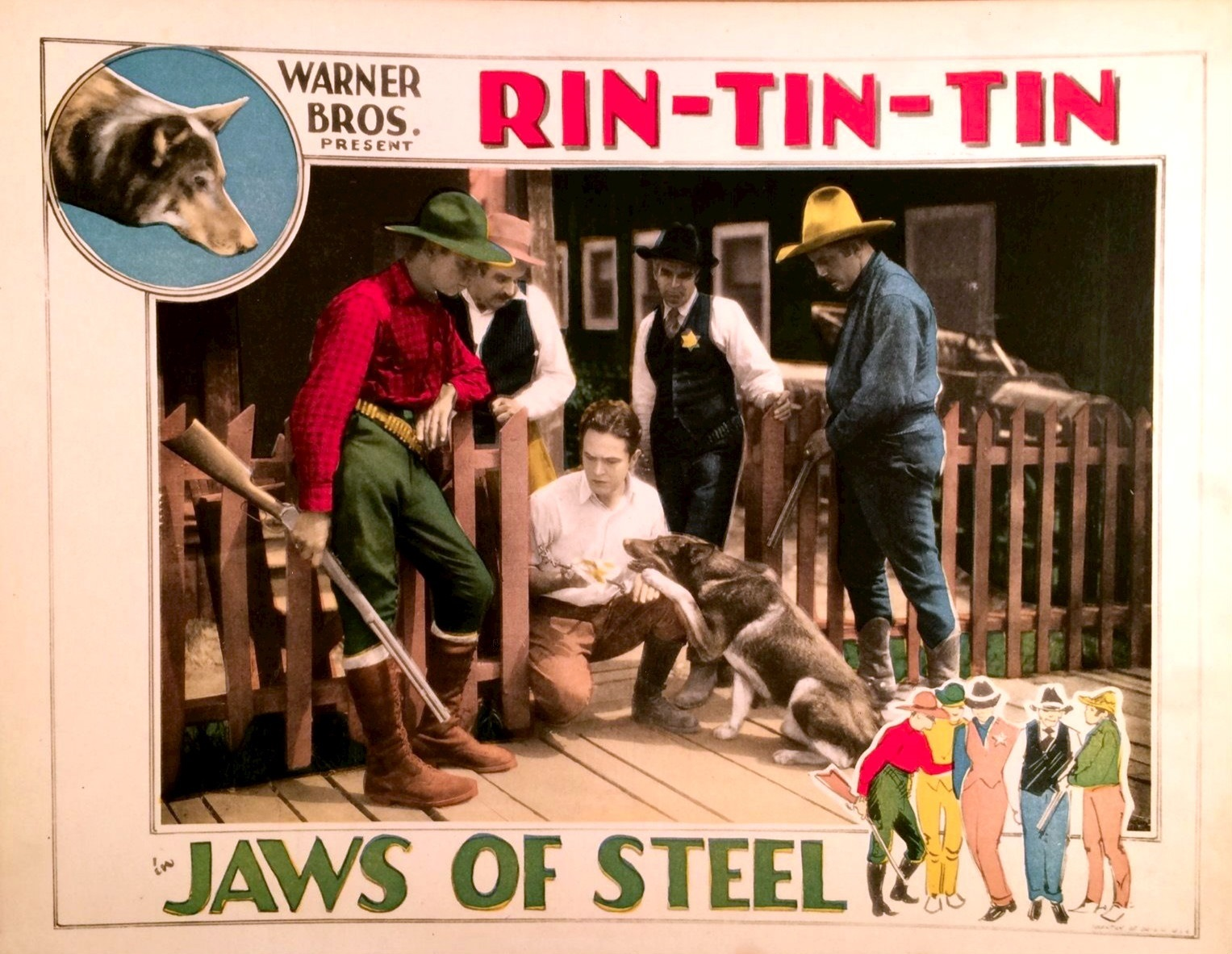
Lobby card

Jaws of Steel is a 1927 American synchronized sound family adventure film directed by Ray Enright and featuring dog star Rin Tin Tin and Jason Robards Sr. While the film has no audible dialog, it was released with a synchronized musical score with sound effects using the Vitaphone sound-on-disc process. Warner Bros. produced and distributed the film. Darryl F. Zanuck, under the alias Gregory Rogers, wrote the story. The film is in the public domain in the United States.

== Plot ==
Newlyweds John and Mary Warren, with their infant daughter, leave behind city life and invest their savings in a modest home and a gold claim in a remote California desert settlement. Accompanying them is their spirited puppy, Rinty. But the dream sours quickly—what was promised as a booming town turns out to be a barren ghost town, with nothing but dust and abandoned promises.

During the family's move, Rinty becomes lost in the desert. Time passes, and while the Warrens attempt to rebuild their lives, Rinty survives alone—growing into a wild and powerful creature, feared by the townspeople as a killer. Though hunted by the local sheriff, Rinty avoids capture, a lone figure haunting the desert wastes.

When John leaves on a brief trip, the sinister Thomas Grant Taylor, a crooked promoter with designs on the Warrens’ claim, tries to force himself upon Mary. She resists him, and John returns in time to defend his wife. But Taylor is far from done—learning that John and old prospector Alkali Joe may have struck gold, he follows them into the hills. There, Taylor murders Joe in cold blood. As he flees, he is ambushed by Rinty, who wounds him—but not fatally.

Meanwhile, back at the Warren home, Baby Warren falls dangerously ill. In her delirium, she calls for her lost dog. Miraculously, Rinty reappears, drawn to the child who once loved him. Though still hunted by the sheriff and townsfolk, Rinty risks his life to comfort her, even racing across the desert to fetch a doctor. His return to the Warren home coincides with a surge in the child's health—her recovery tied to the presence of her loyal, long-lost companion.

When the sheriff and posse corner the injured dog, Mary recognizes Rinty and pleads for his life. Their daughter's sudden improvement, along with Rinty's continued devotion, sways public opinion. And when evidence emerges—thanks to Rinty—that Taylor was the true killer of Alkali Joe, Rinty is no longer the hunted beast but the hero.

== Cast ==
- Rin Tin Tin as Rinty
- Jason Robards Sr. as John Warren
- Helen Ferguson as Mary Warren
- Mary Louise Miller as Baby Warren
- Jack Curtis as Thoms Grant Taylor
- Bob Perry as The Sheriff
- Buck Connors as Alkali Joe

== Box office ==
According to Warner Bros records the film earned $189,000 domestically and $83,000 foreign against a budget of $46,000.

== See also ==
- List of early sound feature films (1926–1929)
- List of early Warner Bros. sound and talking features

== Preservation status ==
A nitrate print of the film is archived by Filmmuseum Nederlands. The Library of Congress has a copy shown to the public in the 1990s but is incomplete, missing a reel.
