= The Devil Within (1921 film) =

1921 film

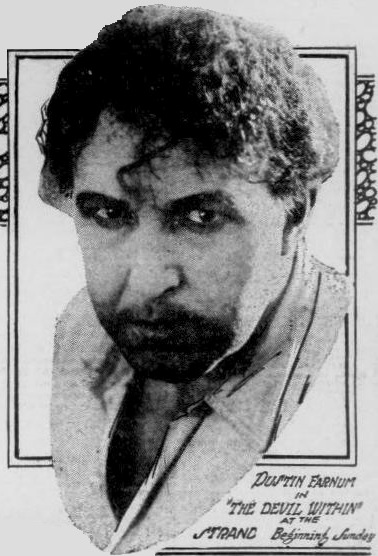
- Directed by: Bernard J. Durning
- Written by: Arthur J. Zellner
- Based on: Cursed by George Allan England
- Produced by: William Fox
- Starring: Dustin Farnum; Virginia Valli; Nigel De Brulier
- Cinematography: Don Short
- Production company: Fox Film
- Distributed by: Fox Film
- Release date: November 20, 1921
- Running time: 60 minutes
- Country: United States
- Languages: Silent; English intertitles

The Devil Within is a 1921 American silent adventure film directed by Bernard J. Durning and starring Dustin Farnum, Virginia Valli and Nigel De Brulier.

== Plot ==
Captain Briggs, an alcoholic, violent sea captain creates trouble for his crew and the native people of the South Sea Islands. As an old man, he has reformed, but his grandson, Hal, enters into the same wild lifestyle.

== Cast ==
- Dustin Farnum as Captain Briggs
- Virginia Valli as Laura
- Nigel De Brulier as Dr. Philiol
- Bernard J. Durning as Hal
- Jim Farley as Scurlock
- Tom O'Brien as Wansley
- Bob Perry as Crevay
- Charles Gorman as Bevins
- Otto Hoffman as Ezra
- Kirk Incas as Cabin Boy
- Evelyn Selbie as Witch
- Hazel Deane as Juvenile Witch

== Reception ==
Jessie Robb of The Moving Picture World gave the film a negative review, criticizing the "poor" story and "uneven action," as well as the feeling that the film's runtime was padded with a large amount of unnecessary close-ups. Robb concluded "It does not seem equal to Dustin Farnum's previous release."

Other trade magazines were similarly disappointed with the film. The Exhibitors' Trade Review called it, "Just another good Fox picture." Wid's Daily wrote, "Farnum gets terrible story for his second," and Motion Picture News felt it was "Not up to 'Primal Law'".

== Bibliography ==
- Connelly, Robert B. The Silents: Silent Feature Films, 1910-36, Volume 40, Issue 2. December Press, 1998.
- Munden, Kenneth White. The American Film Institute Catalog of Motion Pictures Produced in the United States, Part 1. University of California Press, 1997.
