= Dusk to Dawn =

1922 film directed by King Vidor

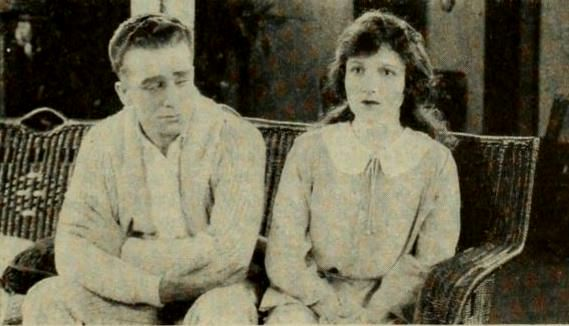
- Film still with Florence Vidor and Jack Mulhall
- Directed by: King Vidor
- Written by: Frank Howard Clark
- Based on: "The Shuttle Soul" by Katherine Hill
- Produced by: King Vidor
- Starring: Florence Vidor
- Cinematography: George Barnes
- Distributed by: Associated Exhibitors
- Release date: September 2, 1922
- Running time: 60 minutes
- Country: United States
- Language: Silent (English intertitles)

Dusk to Dawn is a 1922 American silent drama film directed by King Vidor and starring Florence Vidor. A premiere was held on September 2, 1922, at the Capitol Theatre in New York City.

== Plot ==
An Indian maid and American girl (both played by Florence Vidor) share a single soul which shifts between them each day when they are awake.

== Cast ==
- Florence Vidor as Marjorie Latham / Aziza
- Jack Mulhall as Philip Randall
- Truman Van Dyke as Ralph Latham
- James Neill as John Latham
- Lydia Knott as Mrs. Latham
- Herbert Fortier as Mark Randall
- Norris Johnson as Babette
- Nellie Anderson as Marua
- Sidney Franklin as Nadar Gungi
- Peter Burke as Itjah Nyhal Singh

== Production ==
Dusk to Dawn would mark the final professional collaboration between King Vidor and Florence Vidor. By the early 1920s, Florence Vidor had emerged as a major film star in her own right and wished to pursue her career independently of her spouse. The couple divorced in 1926, and shortly thereafter Florence married violinist Jascha Heifetz

== Theme ==
Based on a novel The Shuttle Soul by Katherine Hill, the story dramatizes the far Eastern concepts of “migrating souls” advanced by Theopism popular in the United States during the 1920s. Vidor may have identified with Theophist methods of faith healing that were compatible with his Christian Science principles, encouraging positive thinking over medical interventions.

== Preservation ==
Dawn to Dusk is currently considered a lost film. In February 2021, the film was cited by the National Film Preservation Board on their Lost U.S. Silent Feature Films list.
