= Nigel De Brulier =

English actor (1877–1948)

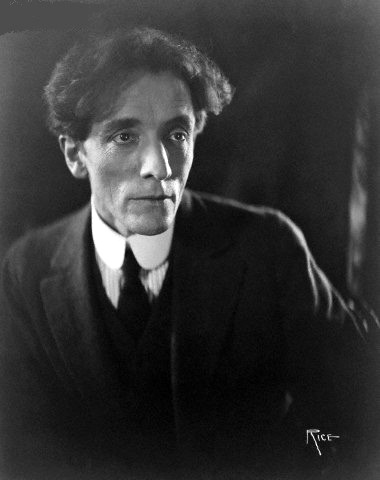
- De Brulier c. 1920
- Born: Francis George Packer; 8 August 1877; Frenchay, Bristol, England, UK
- Died: 30 January 1948 (aged 70); Los Angeles, California, USA
- Years active: 1914–1943
- Spouse: Natale Octavia de Brulier
- Children: 1

Nigel De Brulier (born Francis George Packer; 8 August 1877 – 30 January 1948) was an English stage and film actor who began his career in the United Kingdom before relocating to the United States.

== Biography ==
Nigel De Brulier was born in Frenchay, a suburb of Bristol on August 8, 1877 as Francis George Packer, the son of James Packer, a Gloucestershire coachman, and his wife Louisa Packer (née Field).

De Brulier launched his career as an actor and singer on the stage in his native country and transferred to the American stage after moving to Canada and then to the United States in 1898. In the 1900 U.S. census, he was recorded as Francis G. Packer, butler, in a private household in Denver, Colorado. His first film role was a poet in The Pursuit of the Phantom in 1914. In 1915, he acted in the film Ghosts based on a play by Henrik Ibsen.

He portrayed Cardinal Richelieu in the following four films, The Three Musketeers (1921), The Iron Mask (1929), The Three Musketeers (1935) and The Man in the Iron Mask (1939).

He appeared with Douglas Fairbanks in The Gaucho (1927) and was also one of the few actors of the silent era who reached reasonable success in talkies, although his roles in them were quite minor. He played the wizard Shazam in the 1941 Republic serial Adventures of Captain Marvel and also acted in Charlie Chan in Egypt in 1935.

He played Jokaanan, the Prophet in a silent film version of Oscar Wilde's Salome (1923). A clip of De Brulier in Salomé was used in Before Stonewall, a film documenting the gay rights movement. His French-born wife, Natale Octavia de Brulier (1879-1969), was a Christian Science practitioner, and their daughter, Josephine de Brulier (b. Los Angeles, 1911), was an assistant librarian.

== Death ==
De Brulier died in Los Angeles on January 30, 1948. He was interred at Grand View Memorial Park Cemetery in Glendale, California.

== Filmography ==
- The Pursuit of the Phantom (1914) - The poet (film debut)
- The Hypocrites (1915) - Man in Church (uncredited)
- The Spanish Jade (1915) - Don Luis
- Ghosts (1915) - Pastor Manders (uncredited)
- The Dumb Girl of Portici (1916) - Father Francisco
- Ramona (1916) - Felipe Moreno
- Pasquale (1916) - Banker
- Purity (1916) - Thorton Darcy
- Intolerance (1916) - Extra (uncredited)
- Joan the Woman (1916) - Man at trial (uncredited)
- The Voice on the Wire (1917, Serial) - Professor Duval
- The Bond Between (1917) - Feole Zelnar
- The Gray Ghost (1917, Serial) - Jacques
- Triumph (1917) - Townsman (uncredited)
- The Mystery Ship (1917) - James Lee - Betty's Father
- The Kaiser, the Beast of Berlin (1918) - Capt. von Neigle
- Me und Gott (1918) - The Pacifist
- Kultur (1918) - Danilo
- The Romance of Tarzan (1918) - Priest
- The Testing of Mildred Vane (1918) - Matthew Vane
- The Girl o' Dreams (1918) - Phillip Fletcher
- The Boomerang (1919) - Antonio Giannone
- Sahara (1919) - Mustapha
- The Right to Happiness (1919) - Russian Court Member (uncredited)
- The Mystery of 13 (1919, Serial) - Raoul Ferrar
- The Hawk's Trail (1919)
- Flames of the Flesh (1920) - Henri Leland
- The Virgin of Stamboul (1920) - Capt. Kassan
- The Mother of His Children (1920) - Hadji
- That Something (1920)
- His Pajama Girl (1920) - Manuel Lopez
- The Dwelling Place of Light (1920)- James Rolfe
- The Four Horsemen of the Apocalypse (1921) - Tchernoff
- Cold Steel (1921) - Martinez
- Without Benefit of Clergy (1921) - Pir Khan
- The Three Musketeers (1921) - Cardinal Richelieu
- The Devil Within (1921) - Dr. Philiol
- Foolish Wives (1922) - Monk (uncredited)
- A Doll's House (1922) - Dr. Rank
- Salome (1923) - Jokaanan, the Prophet
- Omar the Tentmaker (1922) - Nizam ul Mulk
- Rupert of Hentzau (1923) - Herbert
- The Eleventh Hour (1923) - Mordecai Newman
- The Hunchback of Notre Dame (1923) - Dom Claude
- St. Elmo (1923) - Rev. Alan Hammond
- Wild Oranges (1924) - Litchfield Stope
- Three Weeks (1924) - Dimitri
- A Boy of Flanders (1924) - Jehan Daas
- Mademoiselle Midnight (1924) - Dr. Sanchez
- A Regular Fellow (1925) - Revolutionary
- Ben-Hur (1925) - Simonides
- The Ancient Mariner (1925) - Skipper
- Yellow Fingers (1926) - Rajah Jagore
- The Greater Glory (1926) - Dr. Hermann von Berg
- Don Juan (1926) - Marchese Rinaldo
- The Beloved Rogue (1927) - Astrologer
- Wings (1927) - Peasant (uncredited)
- The Patent Leather Kid (1927) - The French Doctor
- Soft Cushions (1927) - The Notary
- Surrender (1927) - Rabbi Mendel Lyon
- My Best Girl (1927) - Crippled Pencil Peddler (uncredited)
- The Gaucho (1927) - The Padre
- Two Lovers (1928) - The Prince of Orange
- The Red Dance (1928) - Bishop (uncredited)
- The Divine Sinner (1928) - Minister of Police
- Loves of an Actress (1928) - Samson
- Me, Gangster (1928) - Danish Louie
- Noah's Ark (1928) - Soldier/High Priest
- The Iron Mask (1929) - Cardinal Richelieu
- Thru Different Eyes (1929) - Maynard
- The Wheel of Life (1929) - Tsering Lama
- The Green Goddess (1930) - Temple Priest
- Redemption (1930) - Petushkov
- Golden Dawn (1930) - Hasmali - the Witch Doctor (uncredited)
- Moby Dick (1930) - Elijah
- Son of India (1931) - Rao Rama
- Alias the Doctor (1932) - Autopsy Surgeon (uncredited)
- Devil's Lottery (1932) - Bettor (uncredited)
- Miss Pinkerton (1932) - Coroner James A. Clemp
- Chandu the Magician (1932) - Yogi Teacher (uncredited)
- Rasputin and the Empress (1932) - Priest (uncredited)
- The Monkey's Paw (1933) - Hindu Fakir in Prologue (uncredited)
- Life in the Raw (1933) - McTavish
- I'm No Angel (1933) - Rajah the Fortune Teller (uncredited)
- The House of Rothschild (1934) - Official Giving Instructions to Soldier (uncredited)
- Viva Villa! (1934) - Political Judge (uncredited)
- Charlie Chan in Egypt (1935) - Edfu Ahmad
- The Three Musketeers (1935) - Richelieu
- A Tale of Two Cities (1935) - Aristocrat (uncredited)
- Robin Hood of El Dorado (1936) - Padre at Wedding (uncredited)
- Half Angel (1936) - Dr. Hall
- Down to the Sea (1936) - Demetrius
- San Francisco (1936) - Old Man - Earthquake Survivor (uncredited)
- Mary of Scotland (1936) - Judge
- The Garden of Allah (1936) - Lector at Monastery (uncredited)
- White Legion (1936) - Father Gonzales
- The Last Train from Madrid (1937) - Philosopher (uncredited)
- The Californian (1937) - Don Francisco Escobar
- Zorro Rides Again (1937, Serial) - Don Manuel Vega [Ch. 1]
- Marie Antoinette (1938) - Archbishop (uncredited)
- The Hound of the Baskervilles (1939) - Convict
- Zenobia (1939) - Townsman at Zeke's Recitation (uncredited)
- The Man in the Iron Mask (1939) - Cardinal Richelieu
- Mutiny in the Big House (1939) - Convict Mike Faleri
- Heaven with a Barbed Wire Fence (1939) - Russian Priest (uncredited)
- Tower of London (1939) - Archbishop at St. John's Chapel (uncredited)
- The Mad Empress (1939) - Father Fisher
- Viva Cisco Kid (1940) - Old Mose
- One Million B.C. (1940) - Peytow
- Adventures of Captain Marvel (1941, Serial) - Shazam [Ch. 1]
- For Beauty's Sake (1941) - Brother
- Wrecking Crew (1942) - Father Zachary
- The Adventures of Smilin' Jack (1943, Serial) - Lo San
- Tonight We Raid Calais (1943) - Danton (final film)
