= Charles R. Macauley =

American cartoonist and illustrator

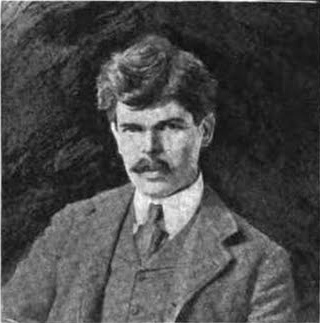

Charles Raymond Macauley (March 19, 1871 – November 24, 1934) was an American cartoonist and illustrator. He was also involved in the film business.

Born in Canton, Ohio, he worked as a freelance illustrator and as staff cartoonist for newspapers including the Cleveland World, New York World, New York Daily Mirror, New York Evening Graphic, and Brooklyn Daily Eagle. He received the 1930 Pulitzer Prize for Editorial Cartooning for his 1929 cartoon "Paying for a Dead Horse".

He got into filmmaking in support of Woodrow Wilson's campaigns in 1912 and 1916. He also made a film in support of his League of Nations plan. After leaving the New York World towards the end of World War I he again got into filmmaking launching his owm film company. In 1919, an advice column in United States Investor warned the company and filmmaking businesses in general were risky and highly speculative.

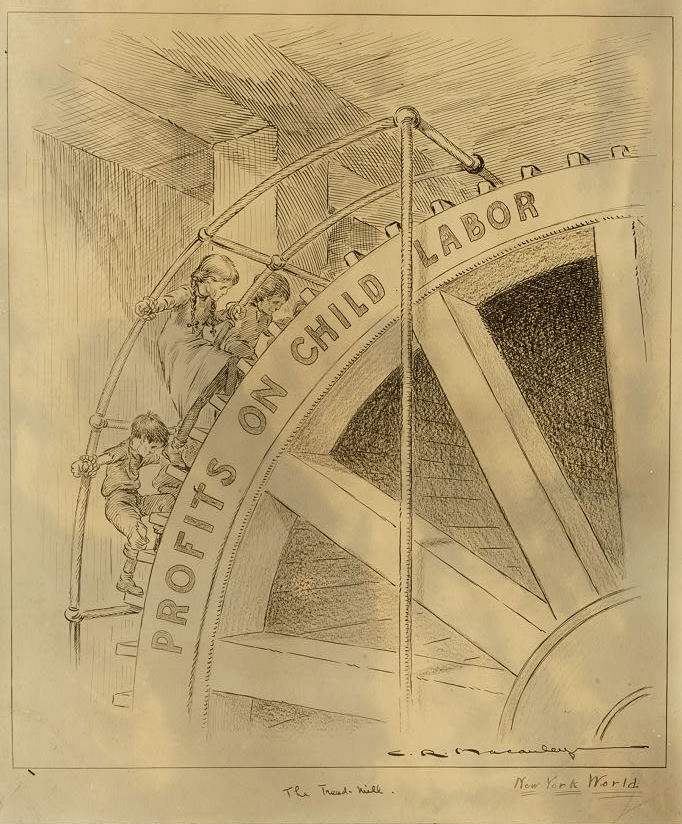
Cartoon depicting the profits of child labor, c. 1913

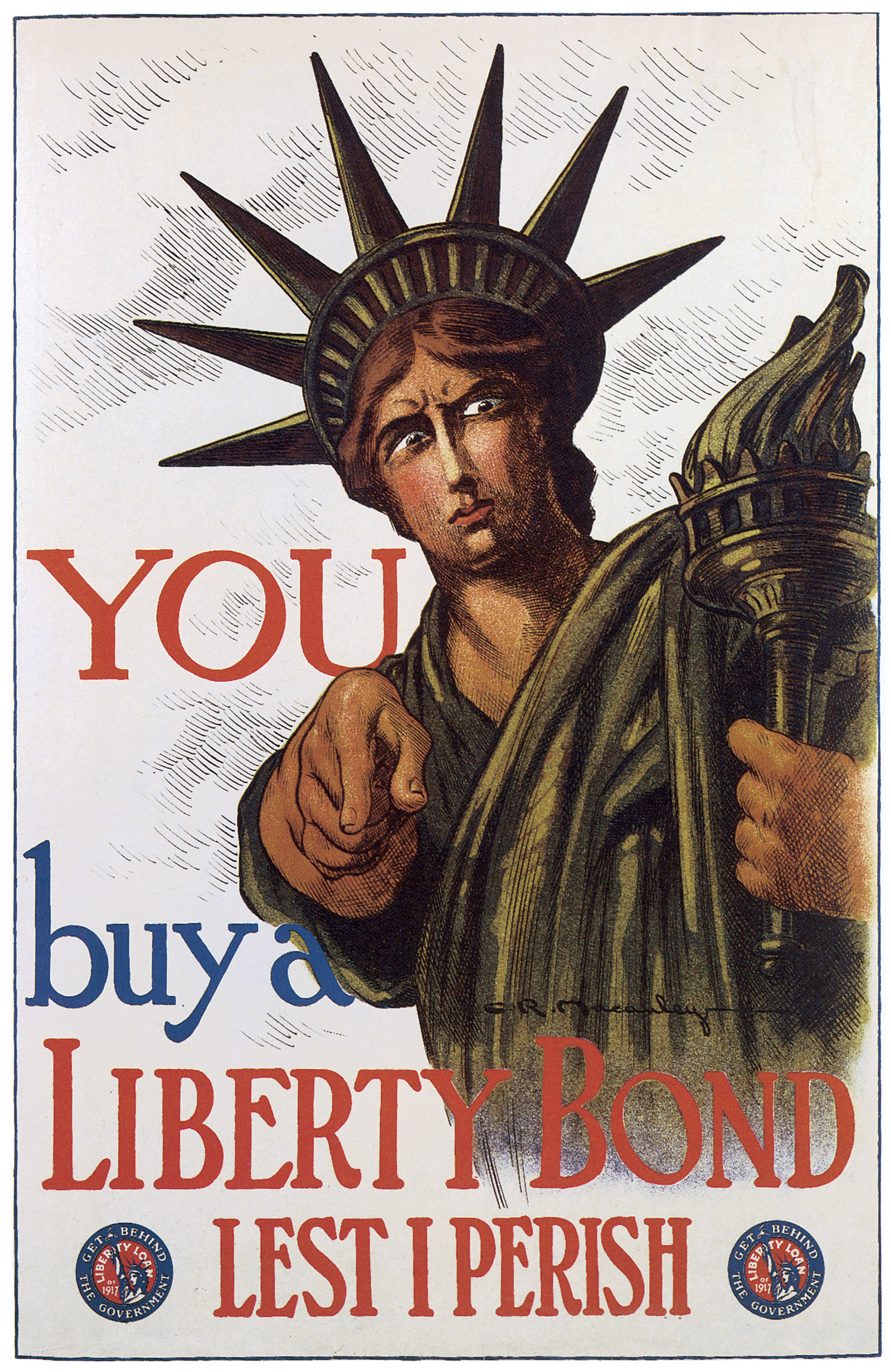
1917 Liberty bond poster

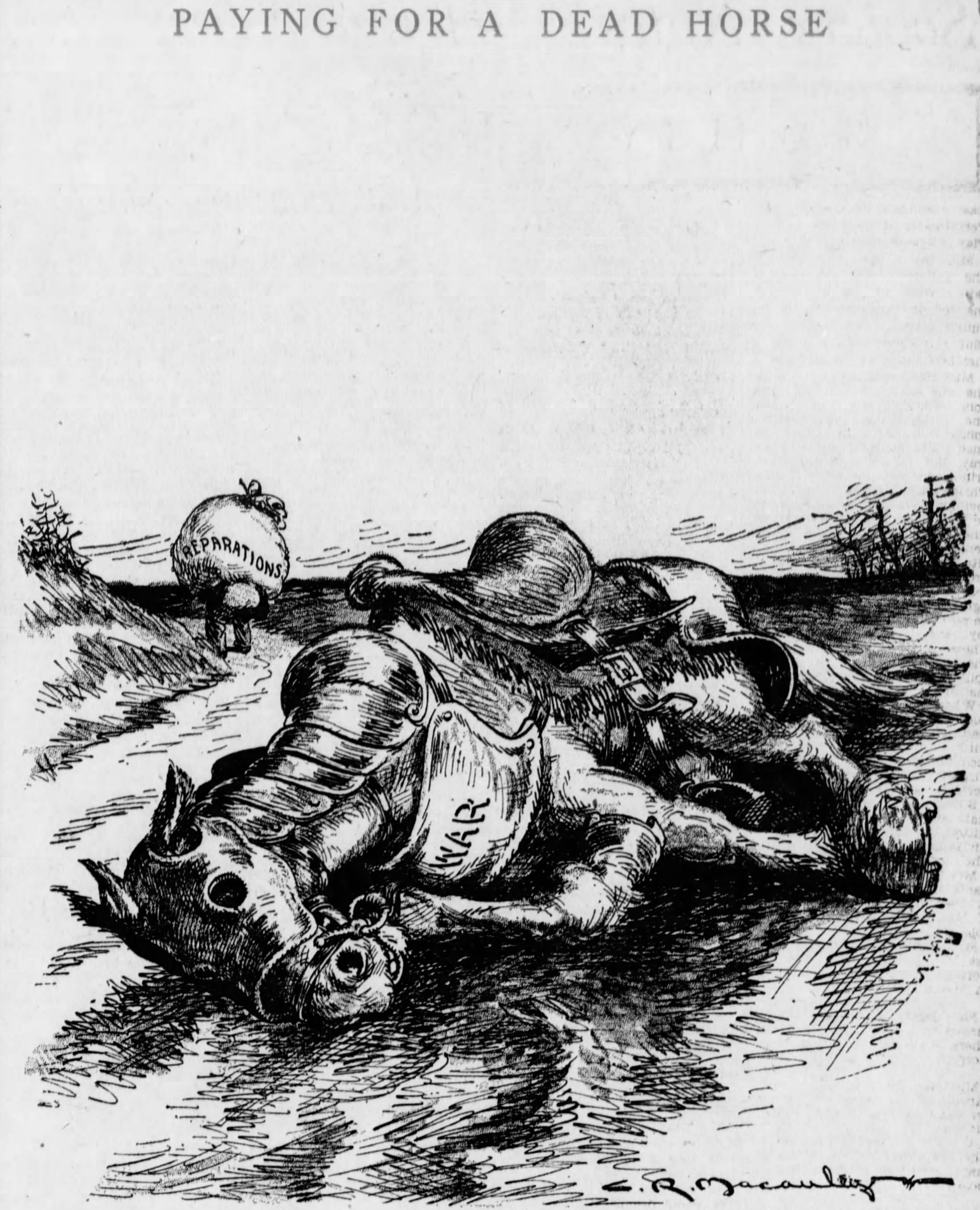
"Paying for a Dead Horse", 1929

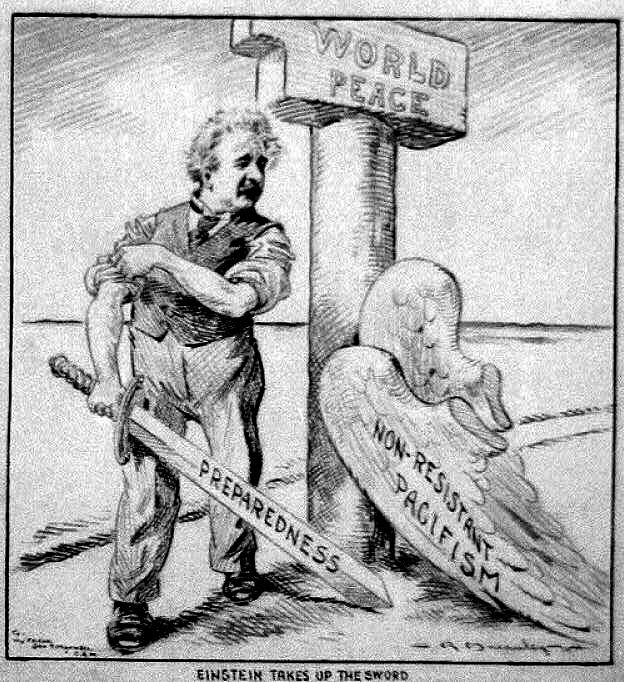
"Einstein takes up the sword", 1933

== Books ==
As writer and illustrator

- Emblemland, by John Kendrick Bangs and Macauley (Doubleday, 1902)
- Fantasma Land (Bobbs-Merrill, 1904)
- The Red Tavern (D. Appleton, 1914)
- Rollo in Emblemland: A Tale Inspired by Lewis Carroll's Wonderland (Evertype, 2010) – recent new edition of Emblemland

== Filmography ==
- The Old Way and the New (1912), screenplay and appeared in it as an illustrator. The film was made in support of Woodrow Wilson's presidential campaign
- Motion Picture Portrait Studies of the President of the United States and the Cabinet (1916), a film about U.S. President Woodrow Wilson up close and his cabinet, it was part of his re-election efforts

C. R. Macauley Photoplays produced:

- Whom the Gods Would Destroy (1919 film) (1919), also known as The United States Government in Action
- When Bearcat Went Dry (1919)
- Seeds of Vengeance (1920)
- The Gift Supreme (1920)
