= The Gift Supreme =

1920 film

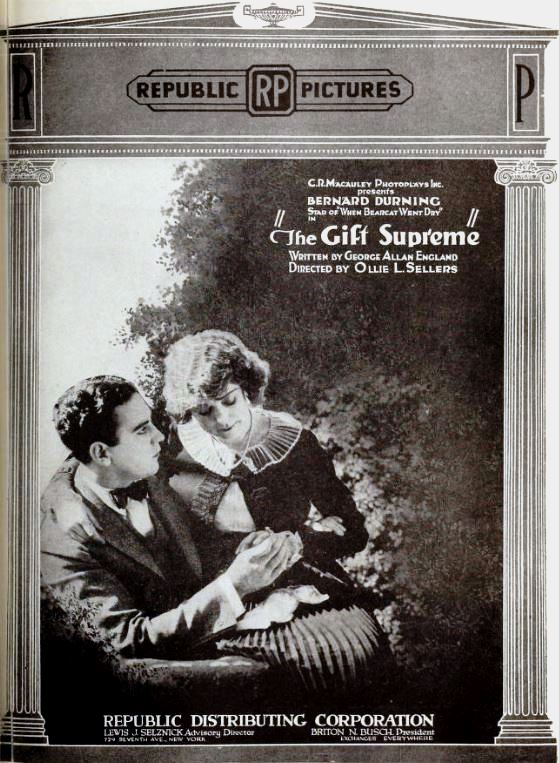
- Advertisement in May 1, 1920 issue of Exhibitors Herald
- Directed by: Ollie L. Sellers
- Written by: undetermined
- Based on: The Gift Supreme by George Allan England
- Starring: Bernard Durning; Seena Owen; Lon Chaney; Tully Marshall
- Cinematography: Jack MacKenzie
- Production company: Charles R. McCauley Photoplays
- Distributed by: Republic Pictures (Cinema Center Films); Inter-Ocean Film Corp.
- Release date: May 9, 1920
- Running time: 6 reels (1 hour)
- Country: United States
- Language: Silent (English intertitles)

The Gift Supreme is a 1920 American silent drama film starring Bernard Durning, Seena Owen, Lon Chaney (in a villainous bit role) and Tully Marshall. The film was directed by Ollie Sellers and based on the 1916 novel of the same name by George Allan England. Most sources do not state who wrote the screenplay, although it was probably written by Ollie Sellers. The assistant director was Justin McKlosky. The supporting cast includes Melbourne MacDowell, Eugenie Besserer, Jack Curtis, Anna Dodge and Claire McDowell. Some sources state the film was released on April 12, 1920, but the majority say May 9.

== Plot ==
Bradford Vinton is disinherited by his wealthy father, Eliot Vinton, for refusing to end his friendship with Sylvia Alden, a beautiful young missionary and singer from Boggs Court, a London slum. Eliot even tries to have the young girl arrested on a false charge of prostitution, for which Bradford angrily excoriates the old man. When Bradford goes to tell Sylvia he has been disinherited, he finds that she has already left town.

Bradford opens a cheap restaurant in the area to feed the homeless and one night, a gangster named Merney Stagg stabs him in a drunken rage. He later learns it was Merney Stagg who helped his father to frame Sylvia.

Bradford is rushed to a hospital, where the doctors say only an immediate blood transfusion can save his life. Sylvia, who is working as a nurse there, immediately volunteers to donate her blood, giving him "the Gift Supreme". When Eliot sees how much she loves his son, he grants them permission to marry.

== Cast ==
- Bernard Durning as Bradford Chandler Vinton
- Seena Owen as Sylvia Alden
- Melbourne MacDowell as Eliot Vinton
- Tully Marshall as Irving Stagg
- Eugenie Besserer as Martha Vinton
- Lon Chaney as Merney Stagg, gangster
- Jack Curtis as Muggs Rafferty
- Anna Dodge as Mrs. Wesson
- Claire McDowell as Lalia Graun
- Scott McKee
- Richard (Dick) Morris as Dopey Dan

== Reception ==
"The story...is interpreted by a cast of well-known andcapable players... Lon Chaney and Tully Marshall play up to the standard of former triumphs." ---Moving Picture World

"As an underworld melodrama, (the film) passes average muster. It would have been possible, with the material in this story, to make a much stronger picture had the director hung his sequences together more compactly and dramatically.... Telly Marshall, Lon Chaney and Jack Curtis are the principal figures in the corps of assisting players and the work that each does stands out through sheer skill." ---Wid's Film Daily

"While 'old stuff' in the main, without any distinguishing high lights either in production, handling or cast, it is interesting...Of the character actors, Lon Chaney takes all the honors with Tully Marshall, of course, doing a small role in excellent fashion. The balance of the cast is acceptable.....The production is in six reels and runs a trifle too long." ---Variety

"The scenario writers have been eating raw meat again. If you are a little tired of slick, nice-mannered and well-dressed society plays, go to see THE GIFT SUPREME and learn that life still runs wild in some places." ---Photoplay

== Current status ==
An incomplete print (reel one of six) survives and is preserved in a private collection. Since the film was released to the 16mm rental market in the 1920s, it is possible that a complete print may survive in the hands of a private collector somewhere, but so far only reel one has surfaced.

A brief clip from the film was used in the Kino produced 1995 documentary Lon Chaney: Behind the Mask.
