= Volcano! (1926 film) =

1926 film by William K. Howard

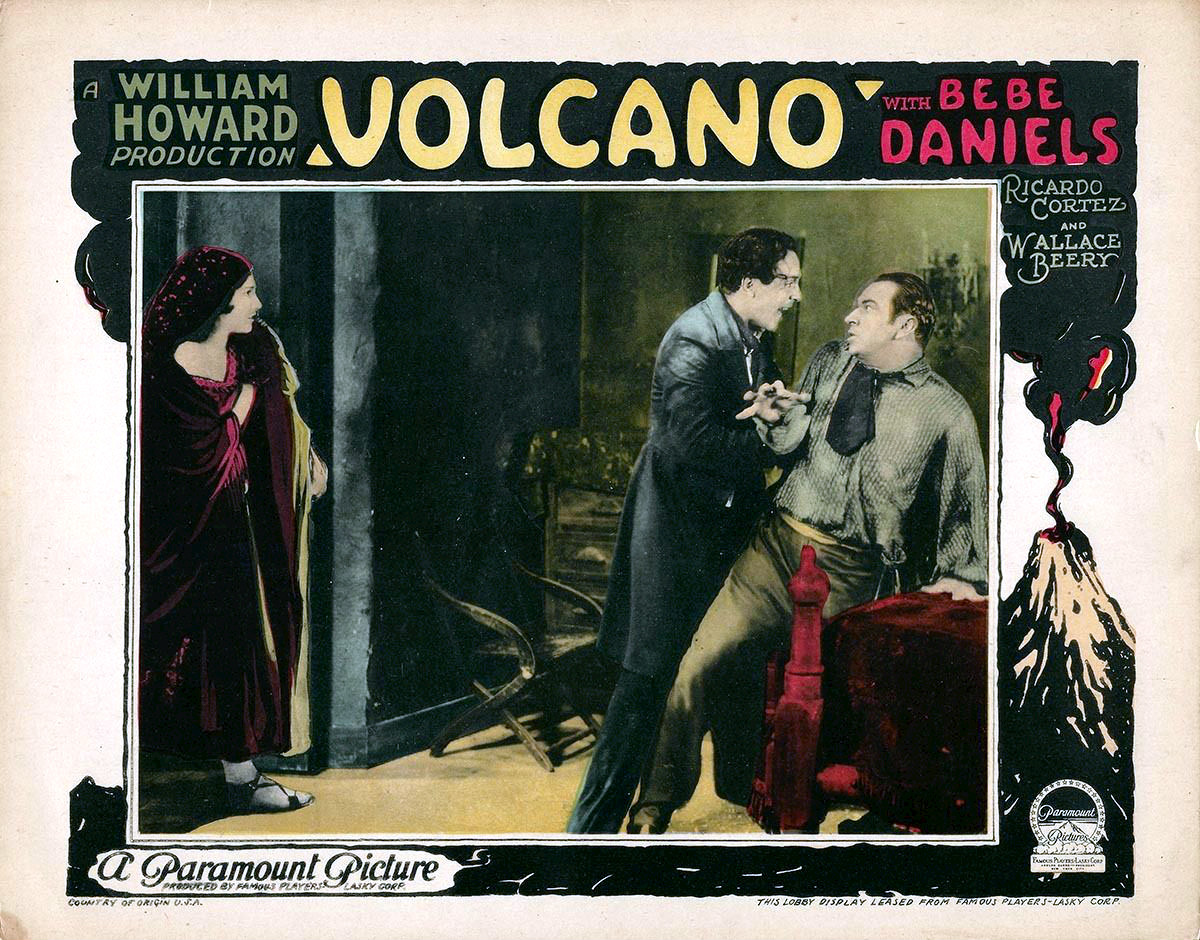
- Lobby card
- Directed by: William K. Howard
- Written by: Bernard McConville (scenario)
- Based on: Martinique; 1920 play by Laurence Eyre
- Produced by: Adolph Zukor; Jesse L. Lasky
- Starring: Bebe Daniels; Ricardo Cortez; Wallace Beery
- Cinematography: Lucien N. Andriot
- Distributed by: Paramount Pictures
- Release date: June 1926
- Running time: 60 minutes; 6 reels
- Country: United States
- Language: Silent (English intertitles)

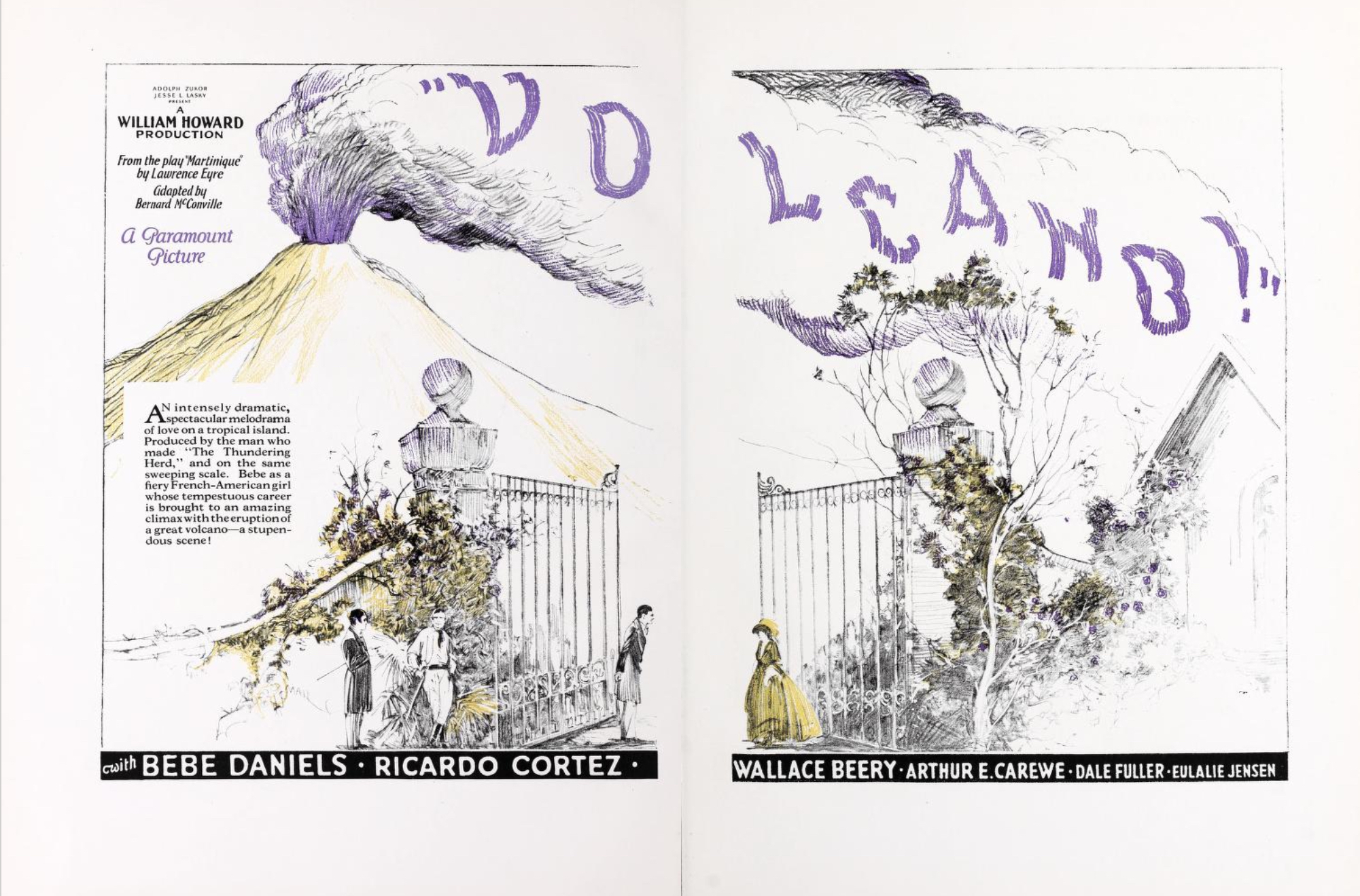
1925 advertisement

Volcano! is a 1926 American silent drama film directed by William K. Howard and starring Bebe Daniels, Ricardo Cortez, and Wallace Beery. The picture was produced by Famous Players–Lasky and distributed by Paramount Pictures.

== Plot ==
Zabette de Chauvalons is a young French woman living in a convent in Brussels, Belgium, during the 1850s. Her father resides in the French colony of Martinique in the Caribbean. At the start of the film, Zabette leaves the convent for Martinique, escorted by Père Bénédict. When she arrives there, she learns that her father is dead. His widow, Madame de Chauvalons, is Zabette's step mother. She believes Zabette to be the illegitimate child of a quadroon woman from Martinique who accompanied her husband to France. Telling Zabette that she is mulatto, Madame throws her out of the house, forcing Zabette to move to the mulatto quarter in town.

Zabette immediately catches the interest of Stéphane Séquineau, a French white man. Destitute, she is forced to auction off her Paris fashions to survive. Quembo, a cunning quadroon, seems to be the highest bidder, but Stéphane outbids him at the last minute. He professes his love for her, which she accepts. However, Stéphane's older brother Maurice persuades Zabette than an interracial marriage would ruin Stéphane. At that point, to save Stéphane, Zabette rejects his love.

Stéphane then becomes engaged to another girl. On the night of their wedding, Mont Pelée erupts, sending lava into town. Stéphane rescues Zabette. When she learns that she is white, Zabette and Stéphane are happily reunited.

== Cast ==
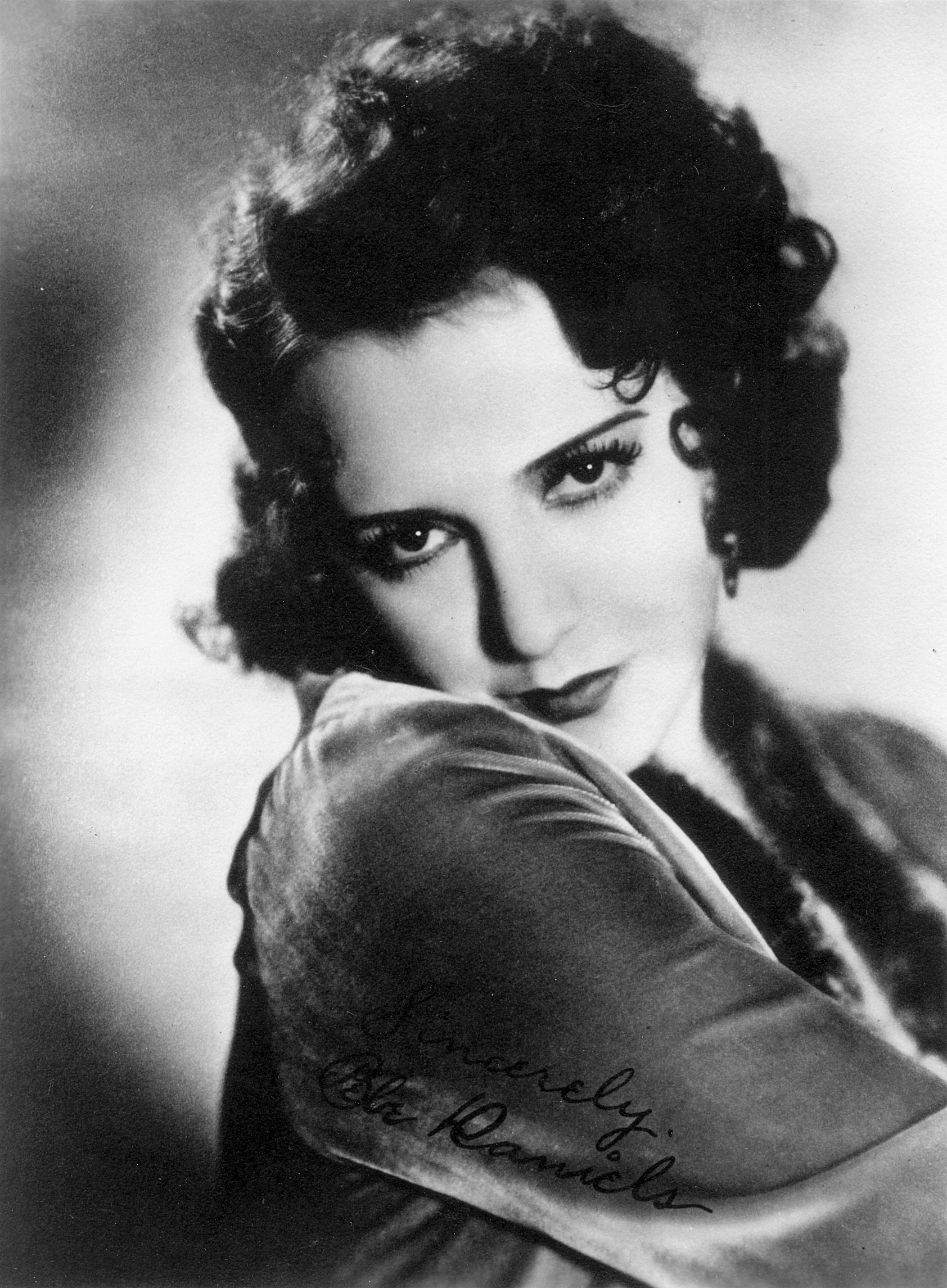
Bebe Daniels as Zabette de Chauvalons

- Bebe Daniels as Zabette de Chavalons
- Ricardo Cortez as Stephane Sequineau
- Wallace Beery as Quembo
- Arthur Edmund Carewe as Marice Sequineau
- Dale Fuller as Cedrien
- Eulalie Jensen as Madame de Chauvalons
- Brandon Hurst as Andre de Chauvalons
- Marjorie Gay as Marie de Chauvalons
- Bob Perry as Pere Benedict (credited as Robert Perry)
- Snitz Edwards as Auctioneer
- Emily Barrye as Azaline
- Bowditch M. Turner as Cafe Manager (credited as Bowditch Turner)
- Edith Yorke as Mother Superior
- Mathilde Comont as Madame Timbuctoo

== Production ==
Volcano! is based on a 1920 Broadway play Martinique by Laurence Eyre. Copies of the film are preserved in the Library of Congress, the UCLA Film & Television Archive in Los Angeles, and the Museum of Modern Art in New York City.

== See also ==
- List of early color feature films
