= Seeds of Vengeance =

1920 film by Ollie Sellers

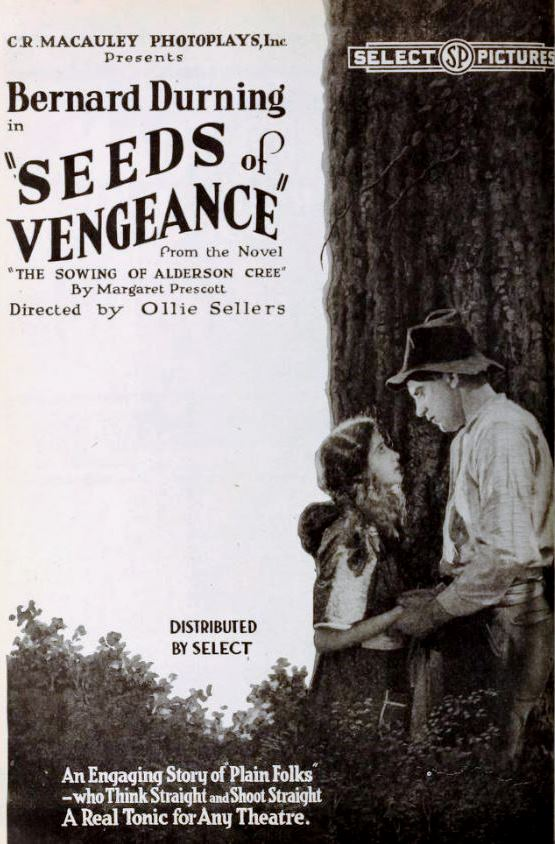

Seeds of Vengeance is an American film released in 1920. It was directed by Ollie Sellers. It was an adaptation of Margaret Prescott's The Sowing of Alderson Cree. The film starred Bernard Durning. It was a C. R. Macauley Photoplay.

It was a 5-reel film was produced by Select Pictures.

Sada Cowan wrote the scenario.

The film is one of at least three Sellers directed with Durning as an actor.

== Cast ==
- Bernard Durning
- Pauline Starke as Ellen Dawe
- Gloria Hope
- Eugenie Besserer
- Charles Elder (actor)
- Jack Curtis
- Evelyn Selbie
- George Hernandez
- Jack Levering
- Burwell Hamrick
- George Stone

== Reception ==
Marion Russell in The Billboard wrote, "Amazingly beautiful photography marks the high lights of this picture, seconded by realistic acting in which character types predominate. Eugenie Besserer gives a stunning performance of a distraught mother. Two charmingly wistful impersonations are contributed by Pauline Starke and Gloria Hope as the youthful heroines. Mr. Macauley is to be congratulated upon a tense, dramatic picture, which grips despite the basic idea is one of hate and vengeance".

The Picturegoer called it "fair entertainment".
