= The Sea God =

1930 film

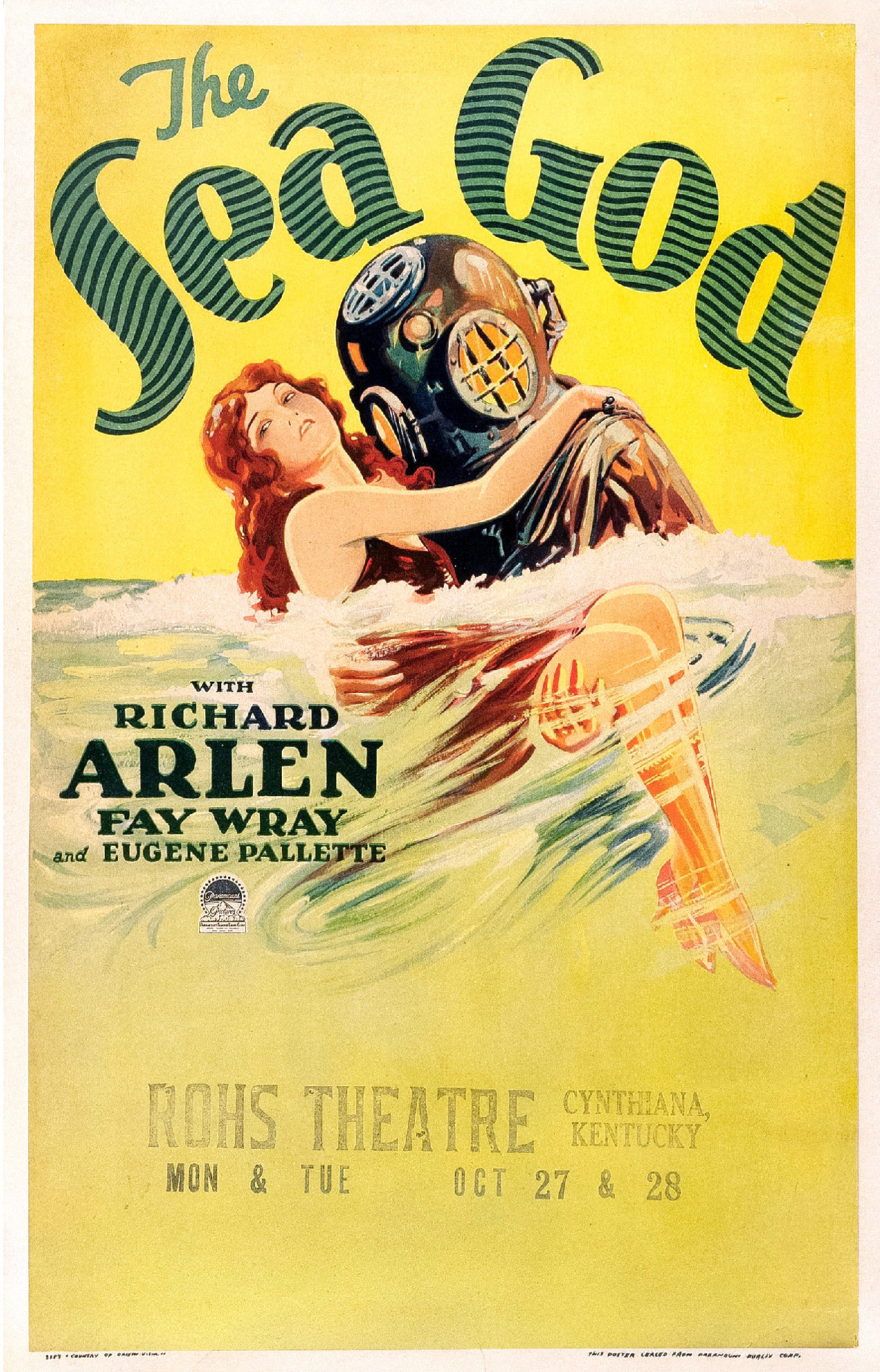
- Film poster
- Directed by: George Abbott
- Screenplay by: George Abbott
- Based on: The Lost God by John Russell
- Starring: Richard Arlen; Fay Wray; Eugene Pallette; Ivan Simpson; Maurice Black; Bob Perry
- Cinematography: Archie Stout
- Music by: Karl Hajos; Stephan Pasternacki
- Production company: Paramount Pictures
- Distributed by: Paramount Pictures
- Release date: September 13, 1930
- Running time: 75 minutes
- Country: United States
- Language: English

The Sea God is a 1930 American pre-Code adventure film written and directed by George Abbott. The film stars Richard Arlen, Fay Wray, Eugene Pallette, Ivan Simpson, Maurice Black, and Bob Perry. The film was released on September 13, 1930, by Paramount Pictures.

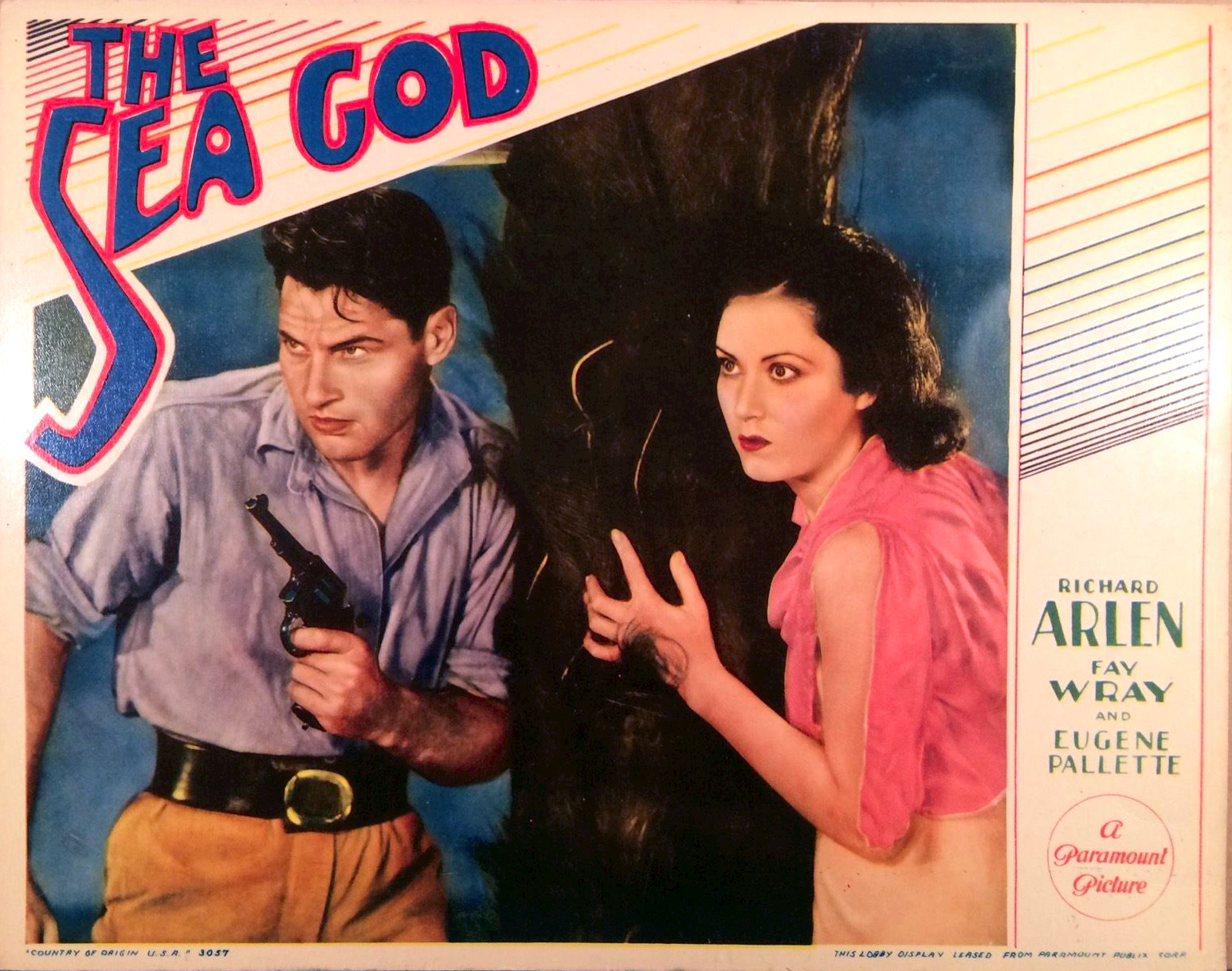
Lobby card

== Plot ==
Pink Barker loses his boat and his girl Daisy to his bitter rival Schultz, but his fortunes change when an old, dying sailor he rescues at sea tells him about a fortune to be had in pearls. Unfortunately, the pearl beds lie off an island inhabited by cannibals. Barker sails in search of the island with his friend Square Deal. Still in love with Pink, Daisy stows away but is soon discovered and forced by her unforgiving ex to work her passage. The cannibals attack Pink's boat while he is underwater collecting the pearl oysters, forcing him to cut his air line and make for the shore. Unable to remove his cumbersome diving suit he later stumbles into the native village where Square Deal and Daisy are being held, and the islanders mistake him for a god. Schultz and his men, having followed Pink's boat to the island, capture Pink, Square Deal and Daisy. Square Deal and Daisy are sent as prisoners to his boat, but just as Schultz is about to do away with Pink, his party are attacked by the natives. Pink escapes but Schultz and his men are all killed. Still trapped on the island, Pink puts on his god-like diving suit again and is able to subdue the natives long enough to swim out to the boat where he is reunited with his friends.

== Cast ==
- Richard Arlen as Phillip Barker
- Fay Wray as Daisy
- Robert Gleckler as Schultz
- Eugene Pallette as Square Deal McCarthy
- Ivan Simpson as Pearly Nick
- Maurice Black as Rudy
- Bob Perry as Abe (credited as Robert Perry)
- Willie Fung as Sin Lee
- Sol K. Gregory as Duke
- Mary De Bow as Mary
- James P. Spencer as Sanaka Joe (credited as James Spencer)

== Production ==
The Sea God was one of at least six films Wray and Arlen made together while both under contract at Paramount Pictures. It was loosely based on a short story by John Russell, a well-known writer of pulp fiction. Russell had also penned The Pagan, another South Seas yarn which was made into a film in 1929. The Sea God was filmed on location at Catalina Island, California, with several scenes being shot at sea.
