= John Arthur Nelson =

John Arthur Nelson was a director, actor, and writer. Nelson wrote, acted in, and directed more than a dozen short films in 1913 and 1914, including a series of Slim Hoover films in which he portrayed the title character. He wrote pro-labor union and anti-America Plan / open shop book The New Disciple and supervised production of the film of the same name that was based on it in 1921.

He was U.S. Film Corporation's Vice-President and headed the Nelson Film Company. In 1915, he was arrested for misappropriating stockholder funds. In 1916 he was sued for non-delivery of the film Slim and the Mummy. In 1917, he tried to establish Dominion Film Company in Victoria, Canada but officials refused to give him land for the business.

In 1920, he got funding for a labor backed film company he headed. It was to produce pro-labor union films.

He corresponded with Samuel Gompers.

== Filmography ==
- Slim Becomes a Detective (1913)
- Slim's Last Trick (1914)
- Slim Becomes a Cook (1914)
- The New Disciple (1921), writer and film production supervisor
