= Norris Johnson =

American actress

Norris Johnson (1898–1971) was an actress in silent films in the U.S. She had supporting roles in various films and also had lead roles in Thomas H. Ince and Samuel Goldwyn productions.

== Filmography ==
- What's Your Husband Doing? (1920)
- Paris Green (1920)
- An Amateur Devil (1920)
- Let's Be Fashionable (1920), as Betty Turner
- What's Your Husband Doing? (1920), as Helen Widgast
- The Speed Girl (1921)
- The New Disciple (1921)
- Lorna Doone (1922) as Ruth
- Dusk to Dawn (1922) as Babette
- The Scarlet Car (1923) as Violet Gaynor
- The White Sin (1924) as Grace's Aunt
