= Robert Perry (actor) =

American actor

Bob Perry
- Born: December 26, 1878; New York City, U.S.
- Died: January 8, 1962 (aged 83); Los Angeles, California, U.S.
- Occupation: Actor
- Years active: 1912–1965

Bob Perry (December 26, 1878 – January 8, 1962) was an American film actor. He appeared in more than 190 films between 1912 and 1965.

== Selected filmography ==
- The Devil Within (1921)
- Iron to Gold (1922)
- Volcano! (1926)
- Jaws of Steel (1927)
- The Fortune Hunter (1927)
- The Singing Fool (1928)
- Shadows of the Night (1928)
- The Spieler (1928)
- Sin Town (1929)
- Noisy Neighbors (1929)
- The Sea God (1930)
- The Finger Points (1931)
- The Lawyer's Secret (1931)
- The Fighting Marshal (1931)
- Hideaway (1937)
- Manhattan Merry-Go-Round (1937)
- The Long Voyage Home (1940)
