= Straight from the Shoulder (1921 film) =

1921 film

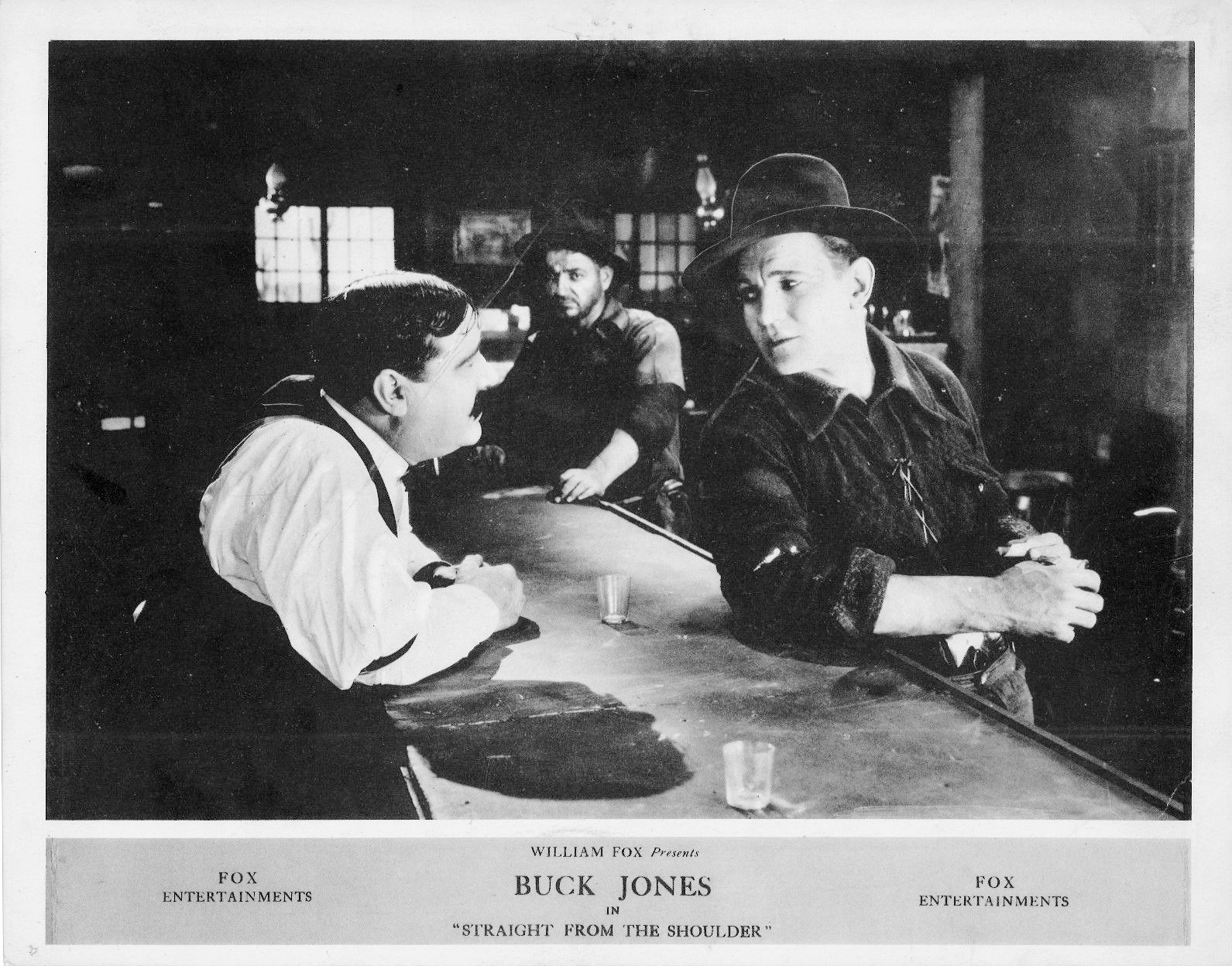
- scene still
- Directed by: Bernard J. Durning
- Written by: Roy Norton(story); John Montague
- Produced by: William Fox
- Starring: Buck Jones
- Cinematography: Frank B. Good
- Distributed by: Fox Film Corporation
- Release date: June 19, 1921
- Running time: 1hr
- Country: United States
- Languages: Silent; English intertitles

Straight from the Shoulder is a lost 1921 American silent Western film directed by Bernard J. Durning and starring Buck Jones. It was produced and distributed by Fox Film Corporation.

== Cast ==
- Buck Jones as Buck
- Helen Ferguson as Maggie
- Norman Selby as Bill Higgins
- Frances Hatton as Mrs Bill Higgins
- Herschell Mayall as Joseph Martin
- Yvette Mitchell as Gladys Martin
- G. Raymond Nye as Big Ben Williams
- Glen Cavender as Pete
- Dan Crimmins as Hotel Owner
- Ethelbert Knott as The Parson (as Albert Knot)
- Louis King as Rogers (as Lewis King)

== See also ==
- 1937 Fox vault fire
