= Deaths in December 1985 =

The following is a list of notable deaths in December 1985.

Entries for each day are listed alphabetically by surname. A typical entry lists information in the following sequence:

- Name, age, country of citizenship at birth, subsequent country of citizenship (if applicable), reason for notability, cause of death (if known), and reference.

== December 1985 ==
=== 1 ===
- Kenshiro Abbe, 69, Japanese judoka.
- Héctor Cassina, 42, Argentine Olympic cyclist (1968).
- Agustí Centelles, 75–76, Spanish photographer.
- Hector Chotteau, 87, Belgian ice hockey player.
- Dada Dharmadhikari, 86, Indian social activist.
- Tania Fédor, 80, French actress.
- Oliver H. Fritz, 80, American politician.
- Tito Goya, 34, Puerto Rican actor, cirrhosis.
- Surya Bikram Gyawali, 87, Nepali historian.
- M'hamed Issiakhem, 57, Algerian painter.
- Mohanrao Kallianpurkar, 72, Indian dancer and choreographer.
- Barney Lepper, 87, American NFL football player.
- Harry Morris, 88, English footballer.
- Yvonne Rozille, 85, French actress.
- Agnes Sandström, 98, Swedish survivor of the sinking of the Titanic.
- Don Stoker, 62, English footballer.
- L. P. Vidyarthi, 54, Indian anthropologist.
- Christy Walsh, 64–65, Irish basketball player and Olympian.

=== 2 ===
- Aniello Dellacroce, 71, American mobster (Gambino crime family), cancer.
- Alexandru Frim, 77, Romanian Olympic bobsledder (1936).
- Heinz Hoffmann, 75, East German politician.
- Philip Larkin, 63, English poet (The Whitsun Weddings, The Less Deceived, High Windows), esophageal cancer.
- Stanley Newnham, 75, English cricketer.
- Calixte Savoie, 90, Canadian politician.
- Curly Thirlwell, 80, American sound engineer.

=== 3 ===
- Sir Conolly Abel Smith, 86, British naval admiral.
- Philip Sidney Bernstein, 84, American rabbi and humanitarian, heart failure.
- Satya Bhakta, 88, Indian politician.
- Bill Cox, 75, English golfer.
- Don Crosby, 61, Australian actor, heart attack.
- Sam Gilman, 70, American actor.
- Miloslav Kodl, 57, Czechoslovak Olympic basketball player (1952).
- Dock Mathieson, 71, Scottish musician and music director.

=== 4 ===
- Hatsu Ando, 73, Japanese politician.
- Frederick Boland, 81, Irish diplomat.
- J. Gregory Bruce, 88, American judge.
- Pearl Corkhill, 98, Australian nurse.
- Dina De Santis, 53, Italian actress.
- Ben Douglas, 76, American NFL football player.
- Ernest Fooks, 79, Austrian-Australian architect.
- Henry Freulich, 79, American cinematographer.
- Elmer E. Johnston, 87, American politician, member of the Washington House of Representatives (1947–1966).
- Roger Leenhardt, 82, French writer and filmmaker.
- Ethel Robertson, 83, Scottish businesswoman and philanthropist.
- Forest Sale, 74, American basketball player, heart attack.
- Bijoy Sarkar, 82, Indian poet and musician.

=== 5 ===
- Holmes Alexander, 79, American historian, journalist and politician, member of the Maryland House of Delegates (1931–1935), heart disease.
- Karl Ammitzböll, 70, Danish Olympic equestrian (1956).
- Mihail Celarianu, 92, Romanian poet.
- Oreste Capuzzo, 76, Italian Olympic gymnast (1932, 1936).
- Miguel Cuéllar, 69, Colombian chess player.
- Loris Fortuna, 61, Italian politician.
- Fernando Gómez Martínez, 88, Colombian politician.
- Alexia González-Barros González, 14, Spanish child and canonization candidate, spinal cancer.
- Jay W. MacKelvie, 95, American general.
- Sir Philip Margetson, 91, British police officer.
- James Auburn Pepper, 70, Canadian politician.
- Alec Roxburgh, 75, English footballer.
- V. Sivasubramaniam, 77, Sri Lankan judge.

=== 6 ===
- Slobodan Anđelković, 72, Yugoslav footballer.
- Carroll Cole, 47, American convicted serial killer, execution by lethal injection.
- Denis de Rougemont, 79, Swiss cultural theorist.
- Walter B. Gibson, 88, American writer and magician.
- Burleigh Grimes, 92, American Major League baseball player, cancer.
- Burr Tillstrom, 68, American puppeteer (Kukla, Fran and Ollie).
- John Vassos, 87, Romanian-born American industrial designer.
- Walter K. Wilson Jr., 79, American general.
- Bud Winter, 76, American track and field coach, heart attack.

=== 7 ===
- Dmitri Borgmann, 58, German-American linguist.
- Gabrièle Buffet-Picabia, 104, French art critic.
- Wilder W. Crane Jr., 57, American politician.
- Malcolm Dixon, 86, British biochemist.
- J. R. Eyerman, 79, American photojournalist.
- John Fallon, 72, Scottish golfer.
- Robert Graves, 90, English poet and novelist (I, Claudius), heart failure.
- Des Martin, 72, Australian rules footballer.
- John C. McQueen, 86, American general.
- Tom Mercer, 75, Australian rules footballer.
- Melvyn Millington, 74, English footballer.
- Shlomo Rosen, 80, Austrian-born Israeli politician.
- Aron Steuer, 87, American judge.
- Potter Stewart, 70, American judge, associate justice of the U.S. Supreme Court (1958–1981), stroke.

=== 8 ===
- Andrey Aldan-Semenov, 77, Soviet writer.
- Lewis H.M. Ayre, 71, Canadian businessman.
- Clifford W. Beck, 77–78, American politician, member of the Washington House of Representatives (1961–1979).
- Rex Boggan, 55, American NFL football player, heart attack.
- Ermenegildo Florit, 84, Italian Roman Catholic cardinal.
- Paul Kelpe, 83, German-born American painter.
- Clara Lynch, 103, American biologist.
- Ma Jir Bo, 58, Chinese painter.
- Dave Madison, 64, American Major League baseball player.
- Bradley Page, 84, American actor.
- Jack Pye, 82, English professional wrestler.
- Jimmy Rudd, 66, Irish footballer.
- Jack H. Skirball, 89, American film producer.
- Ray Thomas, 67, Canadian politician.
- Sir Harry Trusted, 97, British judge.
- Bill Wambsganss, 91, American Major League baseball player, heart failure.
- Chester A. Weidenburner, 72, American judge.

=== 9 ===
- Reginald Bedford, 75, Canadian pianist.
- Micheál de Búrca, 72, Irish artist.
- Donald John Dean, 88, English soldier.
- Anton Dunckern, 80, German Nazi militant.
- Hugo Gellert, 93, Hungarian-born American artist.
- Tirso Hernández, 93, Mexican Olympic sports shooter (1924).
- Calvin Jackson, 66, American jazz musician.
- Ernest Johnson, 64, American football coach.
- Kolle Lejserowitz, 62, Danish Olympic wrestler (1948).
- Jean-Claude Meunier, 35, French Olympic cyclist (1972).
- François Morren, 86, Belgian Olympic sprinter (1920).
- Charlie Munro, 68, New Zealand-born Australian jazz musician.
- Haruyoshi Ōkawa, 75–76, Japanese bear hunter.
- Federico Riu, 60, Spanish-born Venezuelan philosopher.
- Reinhard Schwarz-Schilling, 81, German composer.
- Wilhelm Unger, 81, German writer and journalist.
- Victor Vicas, 67, French filmmaker.
- Bror With, 85, Norwegian mechanical engineer.

=== 10 ===
- Wallace "Mad Bear" Anderson, 58, American Tuscarora activist.
- Leslie Bonnet, 83, British duck breeder and writer.
- Albert Bruckner, 81, Swiss historian.
- Jadwiga Dzido, 67, Polish resistance worker.
- Floyd C. Miller, 83, American politician.
- Pierre Nord, 85, French writer.

=== 11 ===
- Charles Armstrong, 88, British soldier.
- Rupert Kettle, 70, English cricketer.
- Jean Martineau, 90, Canadian judge.
- Francis H. McAdams, 69, American transportation official.
- Bill McConnell, 58, Canadian Olympic rower (1948).
- Kathleen Ryan, 63, Irish actress, lung disease.
- Henry C. Schadeberg, 72, American politician, member of the U.S. House of Representatives (1961–1965, 1967–1971).
- Maksym Skorupsky, 73, Ukrainian soldier.

=== 12 ===
- Anne Baxter, 62, American actress (All About Eve, The Razor's Edge, The Ten Commandments), stroke.
- Priscilla Capps Hill, 85, American philanthropist.
- Bob England, 50, American racing driver.
- Josef Hornauer, 77, German footballer.
- Barry MacKay, 79, English actor.
- Margaret Pitt Morison, 85, Australian architect.
- Charles Singleton, 72, American songwriter.
- Ian Stewart, 47, British keyboardist (The Rolling Stones), heart attack.

=== 13 ===
- Eduard Burdzhalov, 78–79, Soviet historian.
- Paul Caraway, 79, American general.
- Hugh Forbes, 68, British judge.
- Oscar Krokstedt, 77, Swedish naval admiral.
- Donald J. Russell, 85, American railroad executive.
- William Swinnerton, 86, New Zealand Olympic sailor (1956).
- Valerian Tevzadze, 91, Georgian-Polish resistance fighter.
- Ahrne Thorne, 80, Polish-born American newspaper editor.
- Antonio Tovar, 74, Spanish linguist.
- Ann Williams, 50, American actress, cancer.

=== 14 ===
- Charlie Bachman, 93, American football player and coach, heart attack.
- Catherine Doherty, 89, Russian-born Canadian social activist and spiritual writer.
- Sardon Jubir, 68, Malaysian politician.
- Robin Lovejoy, 60, Australian theatre director, liver cancer.
- Roger Maris, 51, American Major League baseball player, non-Hodgkin lymphoma.
- Curley Moore, 41–42, American singer, homicide.
- Thomas Urwin, 73, British politician, MP (1964–1983).
- Bruce Weintraub, 33, American set decorator, AIDS.
- Ruth Wilkinson, 84, New Zealand community leader and historian.

=== 15 ===
- Drew Bowers, 99, American politician.
- Alessandro Passerin d'Entrèves, 83, Italian historian and philosopher.
- Austin Edwin Dewar, 73, Canadian politician.
- István Oláh, 58, Hungarian politician.
- Francesco Pernigo, 67, Italian footballer.
- Sir Seewoosagur Ramgoolam, 85, Mauritian politician, prime minister (1968–1982).
- Carlos P. Romulo, 86, Filipino politician, heart failure.
- Forrest C. Shaklee, 91, American businessman, heart attack.
- Frank H. Sobey, 83, Canadian businessman.
- Jim Stuart, 66, American NFL football player.
- John Thompson, 82, Australian rules footballer.
- Jean van den Bosch, 75, Belgian diplomat.

=== 16 ===
- Bhima Bhattar, 81, Indian businessman.
- Thomas Bilotti, 45, American mobster (Gambino crime family), shot.
- Jan Bull, 58, Norwegian author and theatre director.
- Paul Castellano, 70, American crime boss, leader of the Gambino crime family (since 1976), shot.
- Don Coleman, 93, American actor.
- Red Hamill, 68, Canadian NHL ice hockey player.
- Tadashi Negishi, 73, Japanese Olympic rower (1936).
- William H. Pettit, 100, New Zealand evangelist and missionary.
- Jack Plunkett, 74, Australian rules footballer.
- Dick Pollard, 73, English cricketer.
- Dolores Rousse, 84, American actress.
- Walter Siepmann, 83, German industrialist.
- Mervyn Waite, 74, Australian cricketer.
- Claude Wardlaw, 84, British botanist.

=== 17 ===
- Elmer Bowman, 88, American Major League baseball player.
- Albert Cavens, 79, Belgian-born American actor.
- Victor Cornelins, 87, Danish musician.
- Otto Gotsche, 81, German political activist.
- Svend Iversen, 72, Danish Olympic sailor (1948).
- Alan H. Kempner, 88, American publishing executive and philanthropist.
- Harry M. Leonard, 85, American sound mixer.
- Leo Maguire, 81–82, Irish singer.
- Dorothy McKibbin, 88, American security guard (Los Alamos Laboratory).
- Ken O'Dea, 72, American Major League baseball player, lung cancer.
- Gwyn Richards, 79, Welsh rugby union and rugby league player.
- Stephan Riess, 86, German-American mineralologist.
- Hans Weiss, 75, German racing cyclist.

=== 18 ===
- Michael Ani, 68, Nigerian civil servant.
- Paul Baender, 79, German-Bolivian chess player.
- Kashyap Bandhu, 86, Indian politician.
- Miroslav Bartůšek, 64, Czechoslovak Olympic swimmer (1948).
- Wilf Cooke, 70, English footballer.
- Theresa Goell, 84, American archaeologist.
- Helen Goodwin, 58, English-born Canadian choreographer, drowned.
- Herbert Hyman, 67, American sociologist, heart attack.
- Jolyon Jackson, 37, Irish musician, Hodgkin's lymphoma.
- Joseph Janse, 76, Dutch-born American academics administrator.
- Josef Klapuch, 79, Czechoslovak Olympic wrestler (1936).
- Jef Lowagie, 82, Belgian Olympic cyclist (1928, 1936).
- Leonhard Mahlein, 64, German trade unionist.
- Pavel Mahrer, 85, Czechoslovak footballer.
- Xuân Diệu, 69, Vietnamese poet.

=== 19 ===
- Rik Clerckx, 49, Belgian Olympic runner (1964).
- Jan Dam, 80, Dutch Olympic boxer (1924).
- Wiktor Grotowicz, 66, Polish actor.
- Luis Korda, 73, Cuban photographer.
- Timo Mäki, 71, Finnish politician.
- Homer P. Rainey, 89, American academics administrator.
- Roger Robb, 78, American judge.
- Ivan Brude Stone, 78, American politician.

=== 20 ===
- Coral Buttsworth, 85, Australian tennis player.
- Ishaya Shamasha Dawid Bet-Zia, 78–79, Iranian writer.
- Richard R. Larson, 78, American politician.
- Emil Wecksten, 90, Finnish Olympic wrestler (1924).

=== 21 ===
- Merrill P. Barber, 75, American politician, member of the Florida Senate (1954–1958, 1963–1968).
- Kamatari Fujiwara, 80, Japanese actor (Seven Samurai).
- Joe Genewich, 88, American Major League baseball player.
- Américo Ghioldi, 86, Argentine politician.
- Frances E. Henne, 79, American librarian.
- Carlos Mérida, 94, Guatemalan artist.
- Gordon Allen Newkirk Jr., 57, American astrophysicist.
- Elliott Organick, 60, American computer scientist, leukemia.
- Georg Trump, 89, German typographer.
- Francis John Turner, 81, New Zealand geologist.

=== 22 ===
- Benjamin Bellamy, 94, English cricketer.
- D. Boon, 27, American musician (Minutemen), traffic collision.
- Richard P. Condie, 87, American conductor (Tabernacle Choir).
- Osvaldo Farrés, 82, Cuban musician.
- Ignace Gelb, 78, Polish-American grammatologist, leukemia.
- Lawrence Hauben, 54, American screenwriter (One Flew Over the Cuckoo's Nest), cancer.
- Gus Jenkins, 54, American musician.
- Narcyz Maciaszczyk, 56, Polish Olympic field hockey player (1952, 1960).
- Neil Marten, 69, British politician, MP (1959–1983).
- Vyloppilli Sreedhara Menon, 74, Indian poet.
- Eleoncio Mercedes, 28, Dominican professional boxer, World Boxing Council world flyweight champion (1982–83), shot.
- James Stamp, 81, American musician.
- Clarence Underwood, 73, American football coach.
- Michael Henry Wilson, 84, British scientist and writer.

=== 23 ===
- Martin Beale, 57, British mathematician.
- Birabongse Bhanudej, 71, Thai royal and racing driver, heart attack.
- Alfred Brauer, 91, German-American mathematician.
- Charles Courtin, 83, French Olympic long jumper (1920).
- Margie Hines, 76, American voice actress (Popeye the Sailor, Dizzy Dishes).
- Imants Lešinskis, 54, Soviet Latvian double agent.
- Gina Kaus, 93, Austrian-American novelist and screenwriter.
- James Mackay, 80, New Zealand rugby player.
- Philip Mackie, 67, British screenwriter.
- Dante Magnani, 68, American NFL football player.
- Giovanna Scotto, 90, Italian actress.

=== 24 ===
- Ferhat Abbas, 86, Algerian politician, prime minister (1958–1961).
- Robert Todd Lincoln Beckwith, 81, American farmer, great-grandson of Abraham Lincoln.
- Tommy Blake, 54, American singer and songwriter, homicide.
- William B. Brown, 73, American judge.
- John F. Carrington, 71, English missionary and translator.
- Giulio Lamberti, 90, Italian Olympic rower (1928).
- Pierre Lefebvre, 30, Canadian professional wrestler, traffic collision.
- Biagio Marin, 94, Italian poet.
- Frank Purdue, 86, Australian politician.
- Habibur Rahman, 69–70, Bangladeshi politician.
- Kōzō Sasaki, 85, Japanese politician, heart failure.
- Erich Schaedler, 36, Scottish footballer, suicide.
- Tarzan Tyler, 58, Canadian professional wrestler and wrestling manager, traffic collision.
- Demetrio Vallejo, 75, Mexican union activist.
- Douglas Watt, 71, Canadian politician.

=== 25 ===
- Willard Ray Custer, 86, American aircraft engineer.
- Daniel Daney, 80, French Olympic boxer (1924).
- Madge Elder, 92, Scottish gardener and historian.
- Mick Howell, 39, Australian rules footballer.
- Rattan Jaidka, 85, Indian cricketer.
- George H. Kondolf, 85, American theatre producer, stroke.
- Samuel Mbappé Léppé, 49, Cameroonian footballer.
- Sir James Marshall-Cornwall, 98, British general.
- Raymond Clyne McNichols, 71, American judge, heart attack.
- Jacques Monod, 67, French actor.
- Joe Oriolo, 72, American animator and cartoonist (Felix the Cat), co-creator of Casper the Friendly Ghost.
- George Paterson, 71, Scottish footballer.
- George Rhodes, 67, American music director, heart attack.
- Eddie Taylor, 62, American blues musician.
- Patrick Teehan, 81, Irish politician, TD (1960–1961).
- Dave Zinkoff, 75, American sports announcer.

=== 26 ===
- J. Paul Austin, 70, American business executive (The Coca-Cola Company).
- Les Bell, 84, American Major League baseball player.
- Jim Bilbrey, 61, American Major League baseball player.
- François Châtelet, 60, French political philosopher.
- James Corry, 85–86, Canadian academics administrator and political scientist.
- Raif Denktaş, 34, North Cypriot musician and politician, traffic collision.
- Dinkar Desai, 69, Indian cricket umpire.
- Dian Fossey, 53, American primatologist, bludgeoned.
- Santosh Ganguli, 74, Indian cricket umpire.
- Špiro Grubišić, 81, Yugoslav Olympic rower (1936).
- James Jamieson, 64, Canadian NHL ice hockey player.
- Charles Ogle, 44, American racing driver, complications from a racing collision.
- Jackie Ormes, 74, American cartoonist, stroke.
- Luka Palamarchuk, 79, Soviet politician.
- Antoine Rivard, 87, Canadian politician.
- Margarete Schön, 90, German actress.
- Maxwell Staniforth, 92, British scholar and radio presenter.
- Udaykumar, 52, Indian actor and filmmaker.
- Lionel White, 80, American novelist.
- Cornelia Wood, 93, Canadian politician.

=== 27 ===
- Karl Beurlen, 84, German paleontologist.
- William B. Goggins, 87, American naval admiral.
- Harry Hopman, 79, Australian tennis player and coach, heart attack.
- Bill Isaacs, 71, Canadian lacrosse player.
- Anatoly Nikolayevich Levchenko, 38, Soviet fighter pilot, shootdown.
- Daniel Mangrané, 75, Spanish filmmaker.
- Jean Rondeau, 39, French racing driver, traffic collision.
- Herb Steinohrt, 88, Australian rugby league player.
- Ole Wanscher, 82, Danish furniture designer.
- Harold Whitlock, 82, British Olympic long-distance walker (1936).
- Audrey Wood, 80, American literary and theatrical agent.

=== 28 ===
- E. W. Adikaram, 80, Sri Lankan educationalist.
- Molly Blackburn, 55, South African civil rights activist, traffic collision.
- Renato Castellani, 72, Italian filmmaker.
- Gordon S. Haight, 84, American writer.
- Josef Lense, 95, Austrian physicist.
- Benny Morton, 78, American jazz musician.
- Bob Peden, 79, Scottish footballer.
- Eric Peters, 82, British tennis player.
- Ernie Thompson, 76, English footballer.
- Henry Winneke, 77, Australian politician.

=== 29 ===
- Nola Barber, 84, Australian politician and community worker.
- Ruggero Berti, 76, American Olympic cyclist (1932).
- José Armando Caro, 75, Argentine politician.
- Chu Song-woong, 44, South Korean actor.
- Harold S. Osborne, 98, American electrical engineer.
- Douglas Ryley, 80, British RAF officer.
- Léon Schumacher, 67, Luxembourgish footballer.

=== 30 ===
- Ansco Dokkum, 81, Dutch Olympic sailor (1936).
- Jake Forbes, 88, Canadian ice hockey player.
- Georges Haddad, 61, Lebanese Greek Catholic prelate.
- Alfred Heurtaux, 92, French flying ace.
- László Márkus, 58, Hungarian actor.
- Norm Matthews, 70, Australian rules footballer.
- Elsie McWilliams, 89, American songwriter.
- Bob Pearson, 78, English singer.
- Alexander J. Rohan, 74, American trade unionist.
- Alfred Rushforth, 87, Australian cricketer.
- Howard Taylor, 77, English cricketer.

=== 31 ===
- Lucia Catullo, 58, Italian actress.
- Andy Chapin, 33, American keyboardist, plane crash.
- István Csák, 70, Hungarian Olympic field hockey and ice hockey player (1936 Summer/Winter Olympics).
- Harold Horn, 61, American politician, member of the Pennsylvania House of Representatives (1971–1972).
- Mihalj Kečkeš, 72, Yugoslav footballer.
- Ruth Kemper, 83, American violinist and music teacher.
- Nicolae Kirculescu, 82, Romanian composer.
- Sllave Llambi, 66, Albanian footballer.
- Léon Lortie, 83, Canadian chemist.
- Mal Matheson, 79, New Zealand cricketer.
- Gabit Musirepov, 83, Soviet Kazakh playwright.
- Ricky Nelson, 45, American singer ("Poor Little Fool") and actor (The Adventures of Ozzie and Harriet, Rio Bravo), plane crash.
- Sam Spiegel, 84, Polish-born American film producer.
- Tachikawa Sumito, 56, Japanese singer.
- Jocelyn Toynbee, 88, British art historian.
