= Ishaya =

Ishaya is a given name and a surname. Notable people with the name include:

- Ishaya Mark Aku (died 2002), Nigerian Minister of Sports
- Ishaya Audu (1927–2005), Nigerian doctor, professor, and politician
- Matthew Ishaya Audu (born 1959), Nigerian prelate of the Catholic Church
- Ishaya Bako (born 1986), Nigerian film director and screenwriter
- Ishaya Bakut (1947–2015), Military Governor of Benue State in Nigeria
- Ishaya Bamaiyi, GCON (born 1949), retired Nigerian Army Lieutenant General and former Chief of Army Staff
- Ishaya Shamasha Dawid Bet-Zia (1906–1985), Assyrian author, writer, and poet
- Ishaya Ibrahim (1952–2022), the 18th Chief of the Nigerian Naval Staff
- Tanko Ishaya, Nigerian professor of computer science, vice chancellor of the University of Jos
- William Ishaya, Iraqi diplomat
- Ishaya Shekari, the military Governor of Kano State
