= Hatsune =

Hatsune may refer to:

- Eriko Hatsune, Japanese actress
- Mai Hatsune (born 1978), as known as "Dragon Lady", Japanese Mahjong player
- Hatsune Matsushima (born 1987), Japanese gravure model, talent and actress
- Hatsune Okumura (born 1990), Japanese singer-songwriter signed to Avex Trax

== See also ==
- Hatsune Miku, a Vocaloid software voicebank
- Hatsu
- Hatsue
