= José Caro =

José Caro may refer to:

- José María Caro Martínez (1830–1916), mayor of Pichilemu, Chile
- José María Caro Rodríguez (1866–1958), his son, Chilean cardinal
- José Armando Caro (1910–1985), Argentine politician
- José Antonio Caro (footballer, born 1993), Spanish football defender
- José Antonio Caro (footballer, born 1994), Spanish football goalkeeper
