= Hans Weiss =

Hans Weiss may refer to:

- Hans Weiss (aviator) (1892–1918), World War I flying ace
- Hans Weiss (author) (born 1950), Austrian writer, journalist and photographer
- Hans Weiss (cyclist) (1910-1985), German cyclist
- Hans Weiss (Waffen-SS officer), recipient of the Knight's Cross of the Iron Cross
- Michael Weiß (football manager) (Hans Michael Weiß, born 1965), German football manager
