= Punjabi tamba and kurta =

Type of sarong and shirt, traditional costume in Punjab

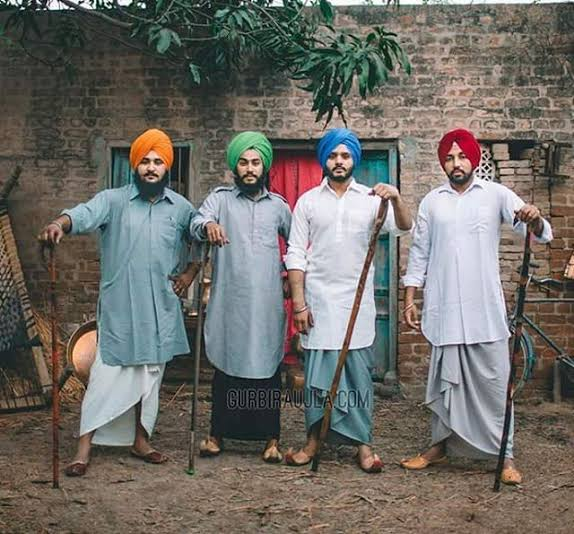
Punjabi Kurta and chaadra

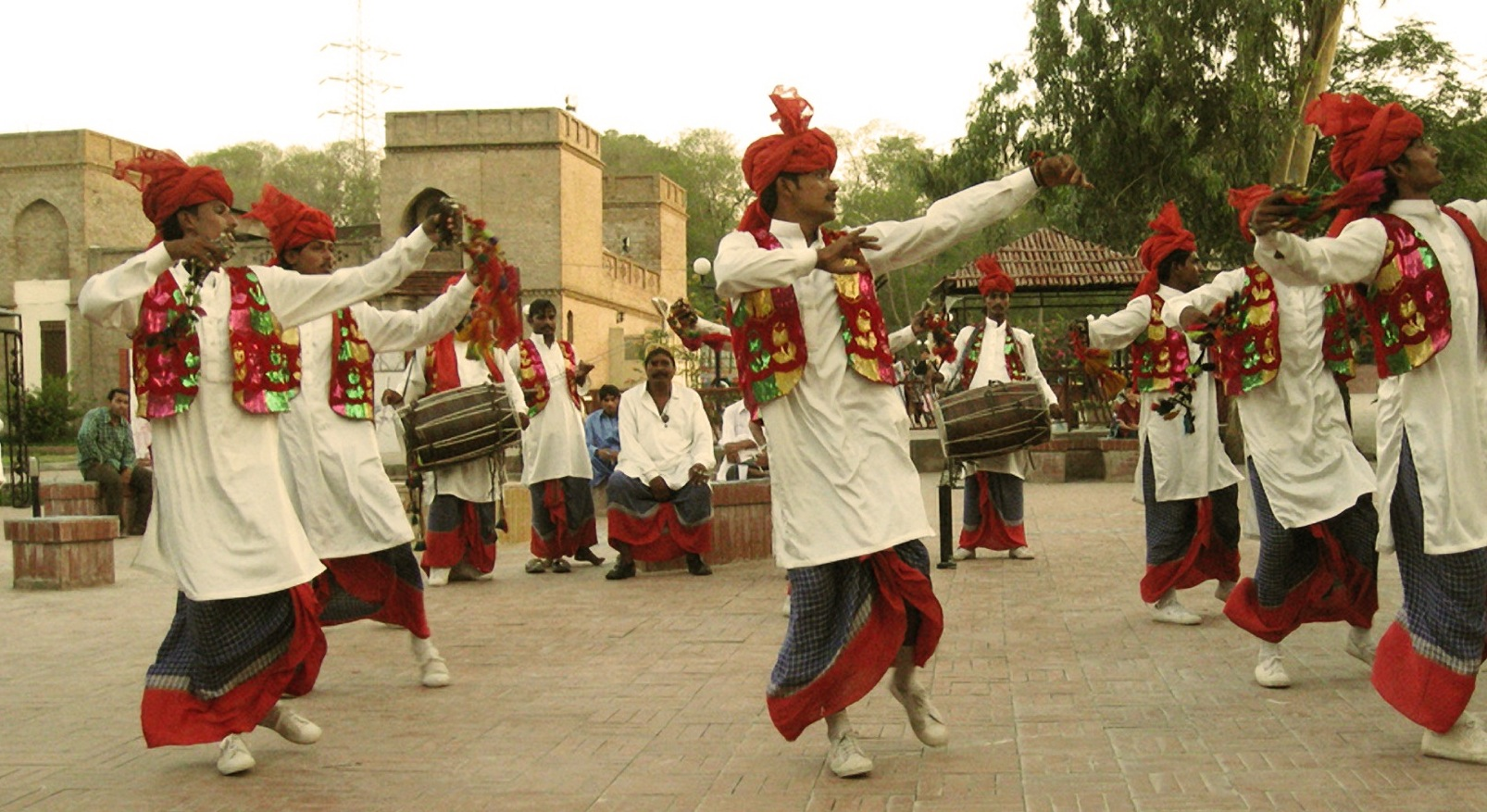
Bhangra Dance performers in Punjab wearing Kurta and Tehmed.

Punjabi Kurta and Tamba are traditional costume for men of Punjab.

== Punjabi Tamba ==
=== Tamba/Tehmed/Lungi ===
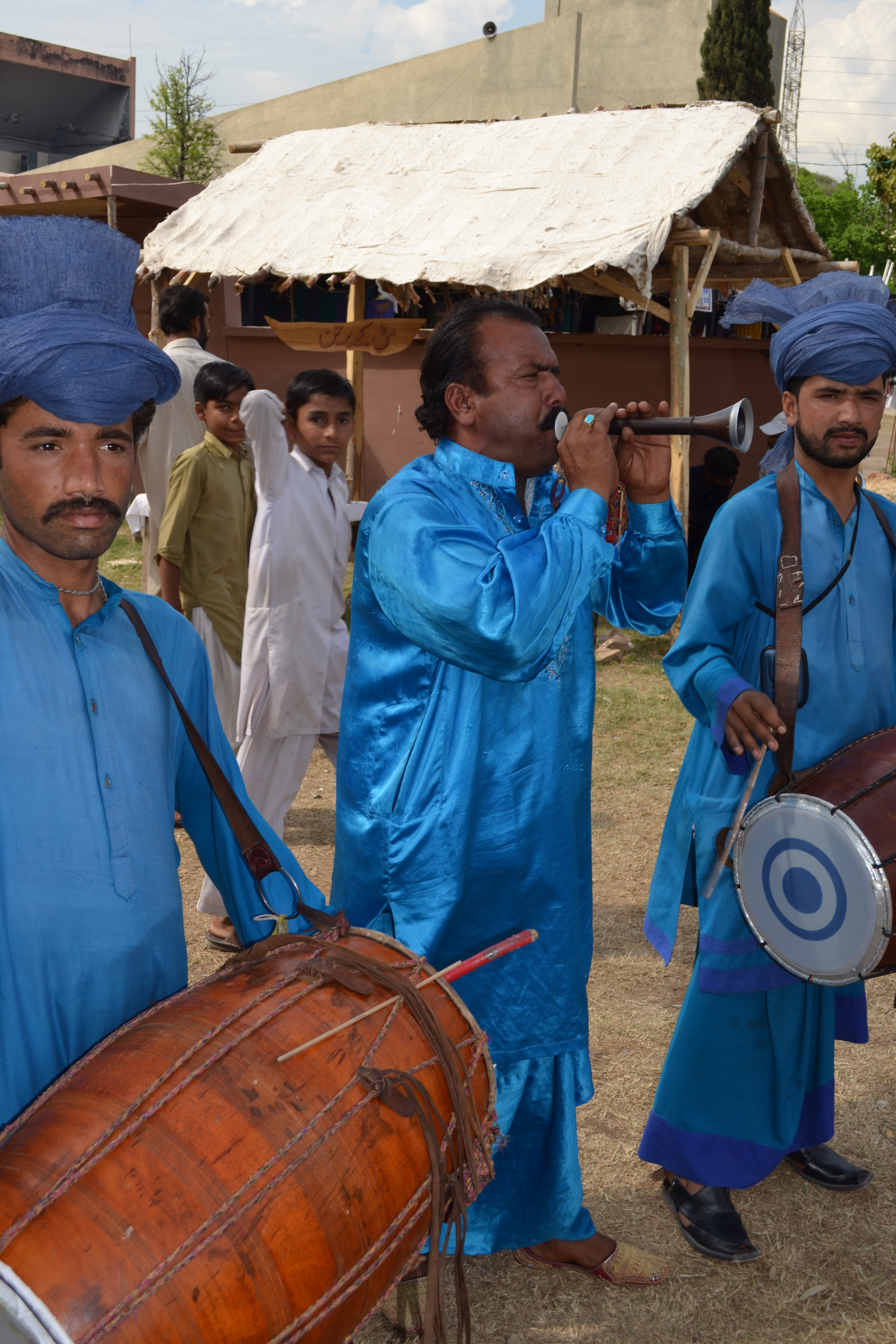
Punjabi kurta and tehmed

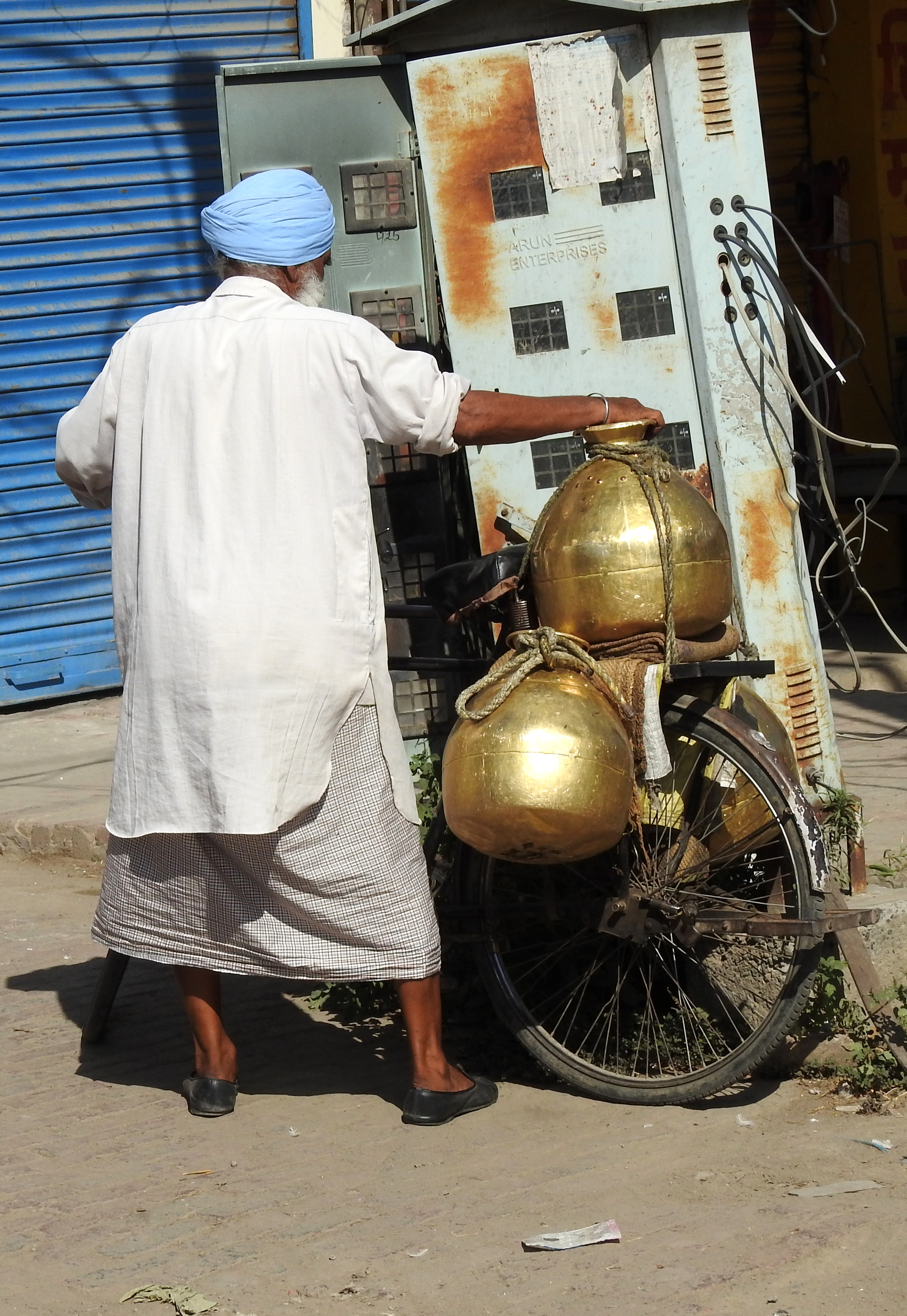
Milk vendor with typical traditional brass containers, Gagar, used in Majha Region of Punjab wearing traditional clothes

The tamba, which is also called tehmed is the Punjabi version of the lungi which has folds at the front and is the traditional dress for Punjabi men. The tamba is worn by Bhangra dancers. Although the use of the Punjabi tehmed in East Punjab has declined in recent years, being replaced by the pyjama, men can be seen wearing the tehmed and its use has not completely stopped. The tamba or the lungi can also be seen on Punjabi men in Punjab province and adjoining Hazara region of Pakistan. A tehmed is of one colour and has no border. The tehmed or laacha can be long reaching to the heels. It can also be short to just below the knees.

=== Laacha ===
A laacha differs from the tehmed in that it has a border and is variegated so that it has more than one colour. The laacha is popular in West Punjab. The laacha is worn in a similar manner to the tehmed except it has more folds. Women in some parts of Punjab wear the tehmed and the laacha, especially the districts of Gujarat, Gujranwala, Shahpur and Muzzafargarh.

== Punjabi Kurta ==
The Punjabi kurta is made of two rectangular pieces with side slits, and a front opening below the neck. In the past, it was traditional for men to wear a gold or silver chain (zanjiri) woven around the buttons.

This form of kurta gradually began to replace the older angarkha worn in the Punjab region which fell to the knees, opened to either the left or the right, and was sometimes known as the anga, the older form of the angarkha and is similar to a gown or a loose coat and wadded with cotton. By the 1960s the Punjabi kurta had almost replaced the angarkha but it was still popular in present-day Haryana.

The Punjabi form of kurta is popular throughout the sub-continent. It is for this reason that, in Bhojpur, Mithila, West Bengal and Bangladesh the kurta is known as 'Panjabi' as the kurta is associated with the Punjab and considered an article of Punjabi dress. The Punjabi kurta was introduced to Assam by King Garib Niwaj of Manipur during his reign sometime between 1709 A.D. and 1749 A.D. where it is also known as Panjabi. It is also worn in Uttar Pradesh and since the 1960s has been replacing the traditional saluka (short shirt) worn in Madhya Pradesh.

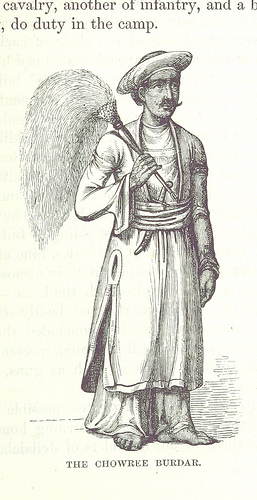
Punjabi straight cut kurta Ferozepur 1845

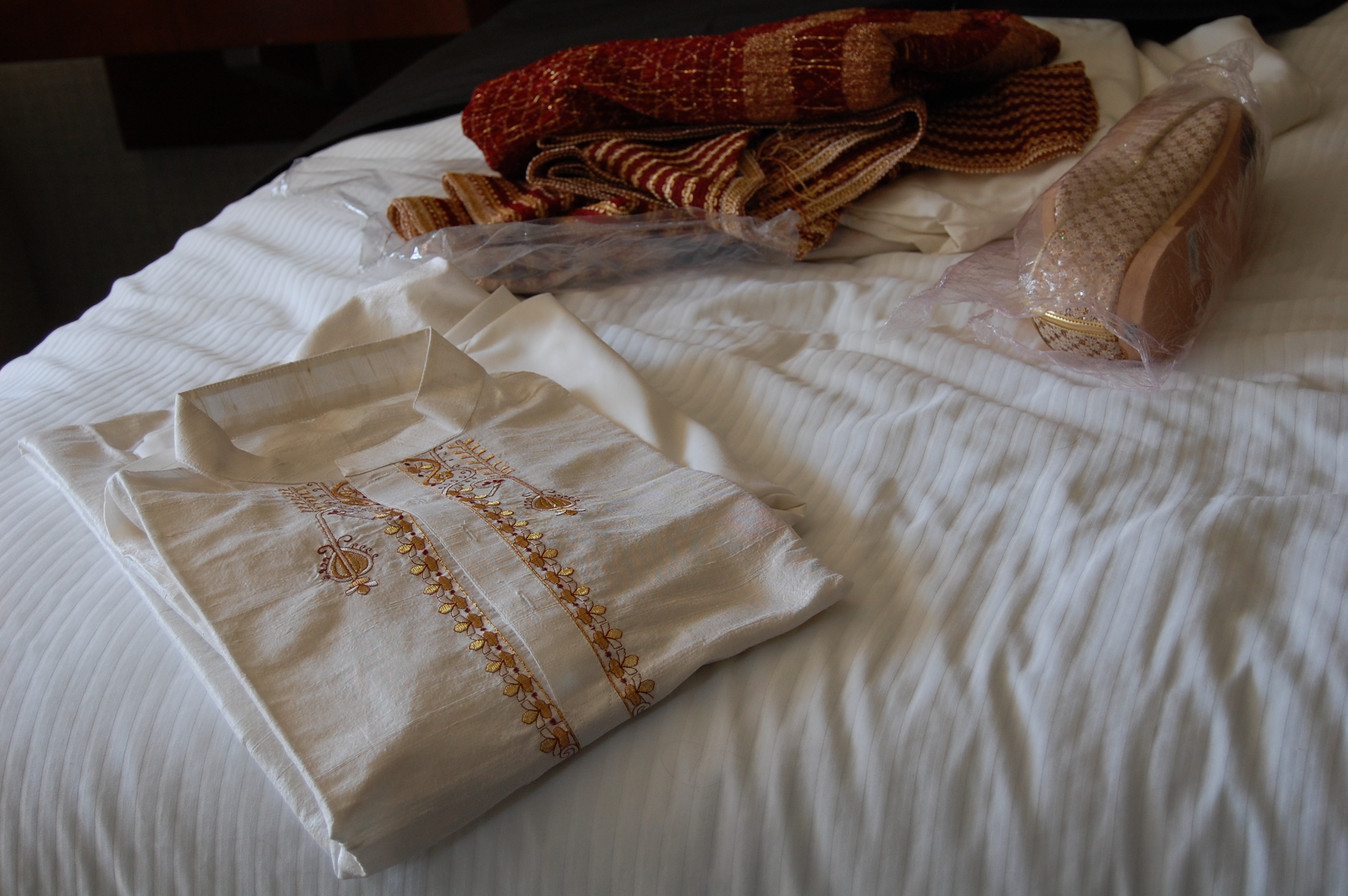
kurta pajama for wedding

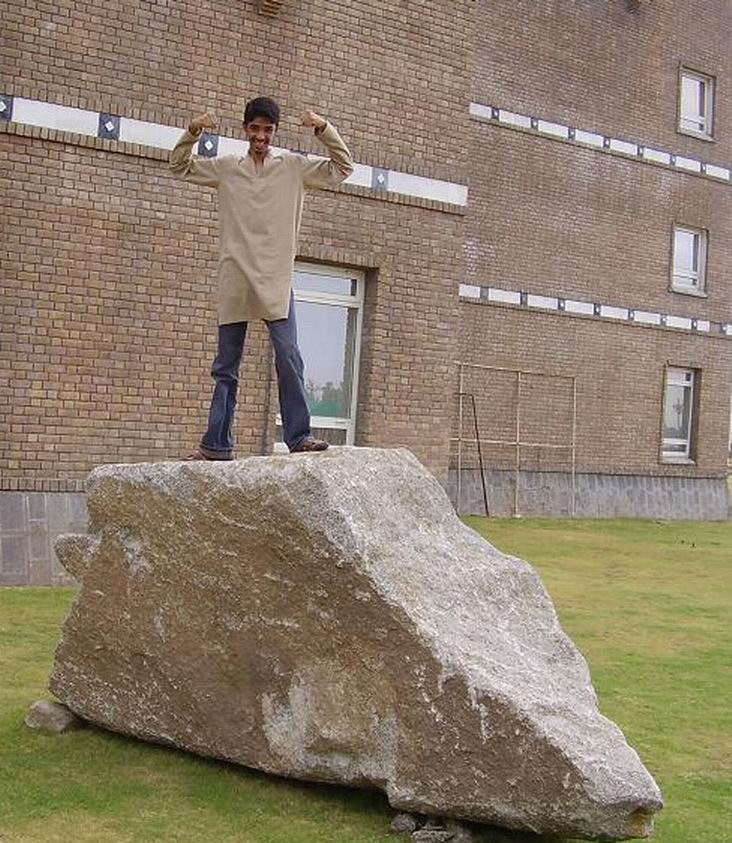
Kurta Jeans

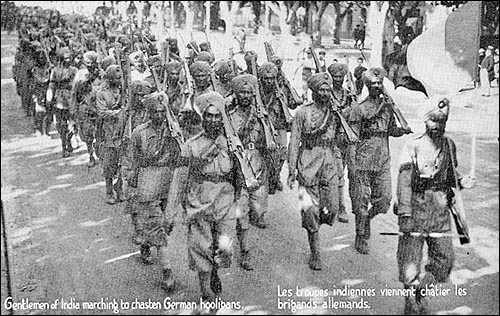
Indian Army 15th Sikh Regiment, wearing kurtas, arrives in Marseille, France on their way to fight the Germans during the First World War

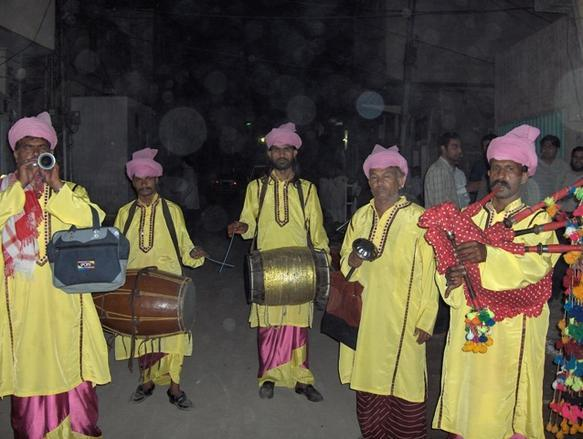
Folk singers in Multan

=== History ===
The term kurta is a generic term to cover different types of upper garments worn by men. Kurta refers to the upper garments worn in South Asia inspired from garments worn by Central Asian Turks who spread their use beyond their region, reaching the Indian sub-continent.

The traditional male attire for men in India consisted of the dhoti and an unstitched cloth draped around the shoulders extended to cover the upper body.

However, men in North India especially Rajasthan and the Punjab region wore the jama of the Rajput type, the chola (robe) (which in the Punjab region remained popular in some parts as recent as the 1980s), the Mughal jama and the angarkha as upper garments, which eventually led to different versions of the kurta being developed, such as the Punjabi angarkha, Punjabi kurta, the Gujarati angarkha and the Rajasthani angarkha, also termed ‘kurta’. A non region specific angarkha is also worn in various areas such as in Himachal Pradesh, Uttrakhand and Uttar Pradesh.

The Punjabi kurta also draws inspiration from the Mughal kurta, which was in common use in the region. However, The Mughal kurta was much looser than the Punjabi kurta, had no side slits and the upper part of the Mughal kurta was also very loose.

The other inspiration for the Punjabi kurta is the Punjabi angarkha which was called the old kurta in the early 20th century A.D. and is a loose tunic which falls to below the knees.

During the 11th century C.E., AL Biruni noted women in north India wore the kurtaka which was a short shirt, with sleeves extending to the shoulders, to the middle of the body, and had slashes on the left and the right sides. Thiis similar to the modern Punjabi kurta worn by women and men which has side slits rather than slashes. The use of shirts and trousers was earlier observed in the Punjab region in the 7th century by Hsuan Tsang and I-Tsing.

In modern usage, a short kurta is referred to as the kurti. However, traditionally, the kurti is a short cotton coat (without side slits) and is believed to have descended from the tunic of the Shunga period (2nd century B.C.). The kurti is front opening and is buttoned. Traditionally, a chain of gold or silver called zanjiri is woven into the buttons. The use of the kurti by women has been noted during the 1600s to the present day. The kurti can be front opening from below the neck to the waist, or cover the back but leave the stomach exposed. Some styles fasten at the back or are worn as pullovers with no side slits and font opening.

The kurti also forms part of male dress as a waist coat worn over the kurta.

Before the use of the kurta, people in Jammu traditionally wore the peshwaj which flowed to the ankles. However, the traditional attire now is the kurta and Dogri pajamma. The use of the kurta was very rare in Kashmir until Kashyap Bandhu encouraged its use in the 1930s cultural revolution.

== Muktsari Kurta Pajama ==
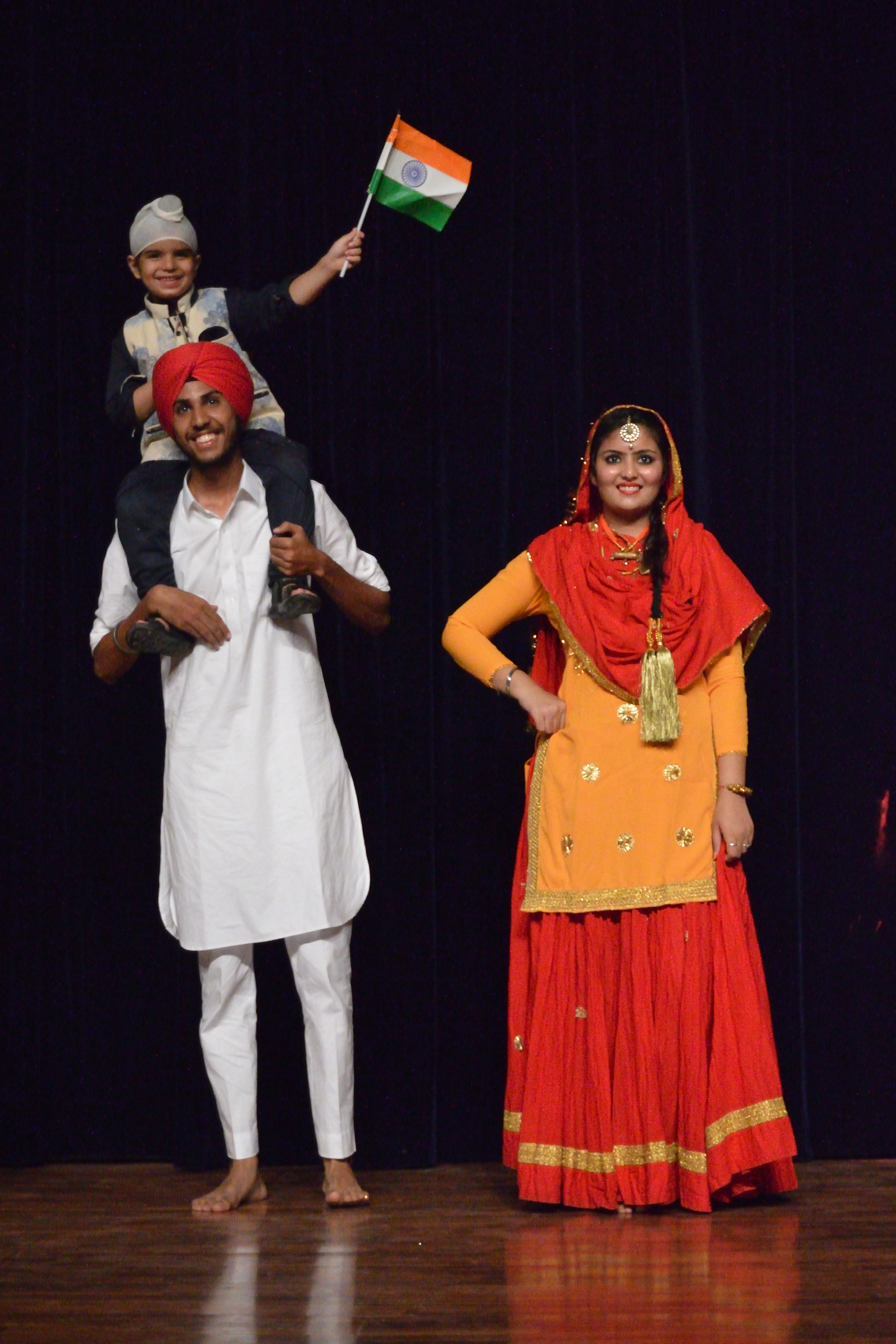
Muktsari kurta pajama

The Muktsari kurta pajama is the modern Punjabi version of the traditional kurta pajama outfit which is very popular on the sub-continent.

Muktsari kurta pajamas were initially worn by youngsters in the Muktsar area. However, they are now popular all over Punjab. The Muktsari kurtas are snug with lapels on either side and the pyjamas are similar to well-fitted slim pants. The kurta length is short and there's no pleating anywhere.

== See also ==
- Kurta
