= Howard Taylor =

Howard Taylor may refer to:

- Howard Taylor (tennis) (1865–1920), American tennis player
- Howard Taylor (cricketer) (1908–1985), English cricketer
- Frederick Howard Taylor (1862–1946), often F. Howard Taylor, British author, speaker, and missionary
- Howard Taylor (1929–2020), older brother of actress Elizabeth Taylor
- Howard Taylor (painter) (1918–2001), Western Australian artist and art teacher
- Howard Taylor (sailor), British sailor at the 1900 Olympics
- Howard D. Taylor (1878–1944), American politician in the state of Washington
- Howard F. Taylor (born 1939), American sociologist
- Howard Taylor (engineer) (1940–2016), British structural engineer

== See also ==
- Howard Tayler (born 1968), creator of the webcomic Schlock Mercenary
- Taylor Howard (1932–2002), American scientist and radio engineer
- Geraldine Taylor (1865–1949), often known as Mrs. Howard Taylor, British Protestant Christian missionary to China
- Howard Taylor Ricketts (1871–1910), American pathologist
