= Stephan Riess =

American geochemist and hydrologist (1898–1985)

Stephan Ernst Riess
- Born: 26 December 1898; Dillingen, Kingdom of Bavaria, German Empire
- Died: 17 December 1985 (aged 86); Escondido, California, U.S.
- Known for: Primary water
- Spouse: Thelma Josephine McKinney
- Scientific career
- Fields: Geochemistry, metallurgy, geo-hydrology, geology
- Workplaces: The Riess Institute (now the Primary Water Institute)

Stephan Ernst Riess (26 December 1898 – 17 December 1985) was a German geochemist, mineralogist, geo-hydrologist and dowser who immigrated to the US after World War I. He worked for over five decades, located over 800 water wells, and studied the concept of earth-generated water, also known as "new water" or "primary water".

Riess ultimately formulated the Theory of Primary Water and through the applied science of geo-hydrology, the study of surface waters of deep Earth origin, worked to end water scarcity globally.

Riess's theory of primary water was criticized in mainstream geological and hydrological publications. A number of wells cited by Reiss as examples of high-yield primary water were found on analysis to be of meteoric origin. In addition, several wells drilled by Reiss did not perform as he had promised. Although the existence of large reserves of water deep underground are not disputed, the potability of such water is.

== Biography ==
Born in 1898 to the Prussian Army officer Herman Franz Wolf Riess von Scheurnschloss and his wife (née Koch) in Dillingen on the Danube, Kingdom of Bavaria (by that date part of the German Empire), he joined a "school ship" at the age of 14 to train to become a sailor. A few years later he served aboard a German Navy ship that was sunk during the 1916 Battle of Jutland in the North Sea. He was saved from the frigid sea by the British and became a prisoner of war. While a POW in England he began to learn English. After World War I he returned to Germany, where he studied chemistry and metallurgy. Affected by the crisis of the post-war years of the Weimar Republic, Riess would travel to Australia and South America and ultimately the United States where he ended up in California working industrial mine concerns.

During the late 1920s and early 1930s while working at mines throughout the American Southwest he experienced frequent flooding of mining operations by what seemed to him as inexplicable and sometimes immense flows of subterranean water. Riess began to study these phenomena as a new area of research. While working for Hoover Family interests in El Dorado Canyon south of Las Vegas, Nevada, where all water was piped great distance and elevation from the Colorado River, Riess worked with a crew to hand dig his first primary water well. When the source was struck, laborers scrambled from the pit to avoid drowning; eventually the free-flowing water created a lagoon until it was brought under control.

== Theory of primary water ==
Steve Riess - Simi Valley

Riess's theories and exploits were chronicled in what is considered to be the primary water textbook, "New Water for a Thirsty World" by University of Southern California economics professor Michael Salzman published in 1960, with a foreword by Aldous Huxley. Salzman learned of Riess as a result of numerous news articles chronicling Riess's exploits during the 1950s. Riess introduced the term "primary water" into English, for what in mainstream geology is known as juvenile water. He called "the new water he finds "primary" because of its close association with primary minerals." In 1957, Encyclopædia Britannica's Book of the Year wrote the following on The "New Water" Theory of Stephan Riess: "Stephan Riess of California formulated a theory that 'new water' which never existed before, is constantly being formed within the earth by the combination of elemental hydrogen and oxygen and that this water finds its way to the surface, and can be located and tapped, to constitute a steady and unfailing new supply."

As a mining engineer in the 1940s Riess had access to government and mining company assay laboratories. In order to investigate the problem of subterranean water which caused certain mines to have to be abandoned, he began taking soil and rock samples from the failed mines and submitted them to chemical analysis. Riess thereby developed a body of test data leading to a previously undetected pattern. These waters, he noted:

- Emanated from below and surged upward, often to elevations far above the water table even in zones of no known aquifer with little precipitation, usually in hard rock
- Was chemically associated with Plutonic rock (which solidifies deep in the Earth where the cooling is slow and the various minerals have had time to crystallize) and not with any of the aggregate usually associated with meteoric water
- Traveled in a vertical or semi-vertical direction from the interior of the Earth toward the surface in hard rock faults or fissures

By 1954, often together with drilling manager Jim Scott, Riess had sited and drilled 70 of these hard rock wells, usually located in distressed areas of little rainfall. In the midst of an extended drought in California, his work would come to the attention of news reporters, water resource bureaucrats, politicians, businessmen, farmers and industry leading to the publication of Salzman's book in 1960. By the late 1970s, he had drilled more than 800 wells that were supplied by what he regarded as primary water, and attracted a group of professionals who would launch The Riess Foundation and, in the 1980s, The Riess Institute to train the next generation of primary water specialists. Christopher Bird nominated Riess in 1982 for the Right Livelihood Award, considered the alternative Nobel Prize. The committee asked that his name be resubmitted in 1983. His legacy continues in the vision of the Primary Water Institute established by his protege and friend Pal Pauer.

As a result of a series of field and laboratory experiments dating back 15 years—conducted primarily by seismologists, geochemists, mineralogists and geophysicists—the theory that water is produced deep within the planet and is an addition to the hydrologic cycle has now been proven (2017):

“This is one way water can form on Earth,” says team member John Tse at the University of Saskatchewan in Canada. “We show it's possible to have water forming in Earth's natural environment, rather than being of extraterrestrial origin.”

=== Criticism ===
Riess's theory of primary water was criticized in mainstream geological and hydrological publications, including those of the US Geological Survey;” the California Division of Mines and Geology, the National Water Well Association, and the American Water Works Association.

His theory received much publicity in the popular press during his life, and has become popular with dowsers. It received very little support from John Mann Jr - a groundwater scientist in the 1950s. Riess' assertion that there are large volumes of potable primary water (what geologists now recognise as juvenile water) had been examined in the 1960s and rejected by hydrologists of the California Department of Water Resources and the US Geological Survey. Scientists from both organizations found no evidence that water pumped from Riess-located wells was anything but normal groundwater derived from downward-infiltrating precipitation. The California Department of Water Resources compiled information on wells located by Riess, and of the 11 wells for which they had reliable information, yields varied from 0 to 90 gallons per minute, with an average of 19 gallons per minute artesian flow, with no data on the range of 500 to 3,000 gallons per minute pumping rate claimed by Riess for his wells.

As of 2015 the United States Department of the Interior recognised Riess's Primary Water theories under the name juvenile water, but they note that while the research indicates that a vast volume of water is present within the mantle and that water is recycled, the residence time for the water exceeds ten million years rendering mantle water an impractical water resource.

The existence of juvenile water has been commonly accepted by mainstream groundwater scientists, such as those of the US Geological Survey, since the 1920s. The disagreement has been that juvenile water – what Reiss called primary water, is considered by most groundwater scientists to be too highly mineralized to be potable. In a 1963 criticism of the Riess theory published by the US Geological Survey, C. L. McGuinness wrote:

There is no doubt that new water reaches the earth's surface from the interior. Geologists call it "juvenile water." … It is invariably high in mineral content, however;”

Geologists from the California Department of Water Resources investigated a number of wells cited by Reiss as examples of high-yield primary water wells. They reported that the actual flow rates were in most cases much lower than claimed by Riess. In addition, oxygen isotope analysis of the water identified it as of meteoric origin.

In an editorial "New nonsense for a thirsty world," the Water Well Journal called attention to Reiss' failures at Alpine, Texas and Camp Desert Rock, Nevada. The editorial noted that the Riess-located well at Avalon, California, favorably mentioned by Salzman on page 51 of New Water for a Thirsty World, produced only 20 gallons per minute. It also noted that in discussing the supposed sale of Riess' Simi Valley wells to Clint Murchison for $1 million, Salzman failed to inform readers that Murchison paid Riess only $108,000 as a down payment, but after testing the wells and finding that they did not perform as Riess had promised, Murchison cancelled the deal. Reiss subsequently sued Murchison for breach of contract.
