= Global meteoric water line =

Chemical ratio in meteoric waters

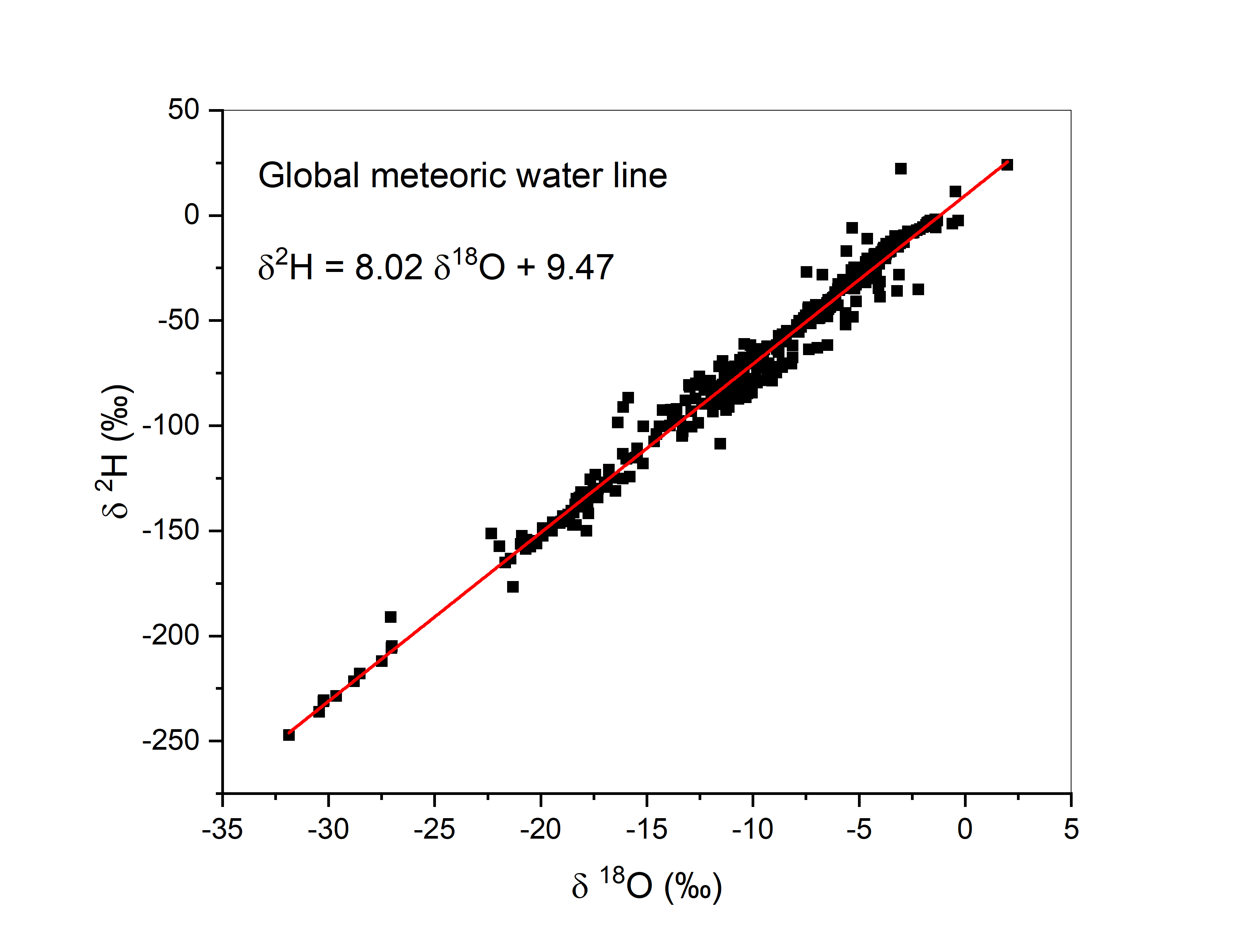
Global meteoric water line. Data are global annual average ^{18}O and ^{2}H values from precipitation monitored at IAEA network stations distributed globally (n = 420).

The Global Meteoric Water Line (GMWL) describes the global annual average relationship between hydrogen and oxygen isotope (oxygen-18 [^{18}O] and deuterium [^{2}H]) ratios in natural meteoric waters. The GMWL was first developed in 1961 by the American geochemist Harmon Craig and has subsequently been widely used to track water masses in environmental geochemistry and hydrogeology.

== Development and definition of GMWL ==
When working on the global annual average isotopic composition of ^{18}O and ^{2}H (D, for deuterium) in meteoric water, for waters having not undergone excessive evaporation, geochemist Harmon Craig observed a linear correlation relative to ocean water over the entire range between these two isotopes. He subsequently developed and defined the equation for GMWL:

$$\delta\ce D = \delta^{2}\ce H = 8.0\cdot\delta^{18}\ce O + 10\ {}^{0\!}\!/\!_{00}$$

Where δ^{18}O and δ^{2}H (aka δD) reflect the enrichment (or the depletion) of the heavy isotopes (e.g. ^{18}O versus ^{16}O, or ^{2}H versus ^{1}H). Note that the factor 8 (slope of the straight line) also corresponds to the atomic mass ratio between ^{2}H and ^{16}O.

The relationship of δ^{18}O and δ^{2}H in meteoric water is caused by mass-dependent fractionation of oxygen and hydrogen isotopes between evaporation from ocean seawater and condensation from vapor. As oxygen isotopes (^{18, 16}O) and hydrogen isotopes (^{2, 1}H) have different masses, they behave differently in the evaporation and condensation processes, and thus result in the fractionation between ^{18}O and ^{16}O as well as ^{2}H and ^{1}H. Equilibrium fractionation causes the isotope ratios of δ^{18}O and δ^{2}H to vary between localities within the area. The fractionation processes can be influenced by a number of factors including: temperature, latitude, continentality, and most importantly, humidity.

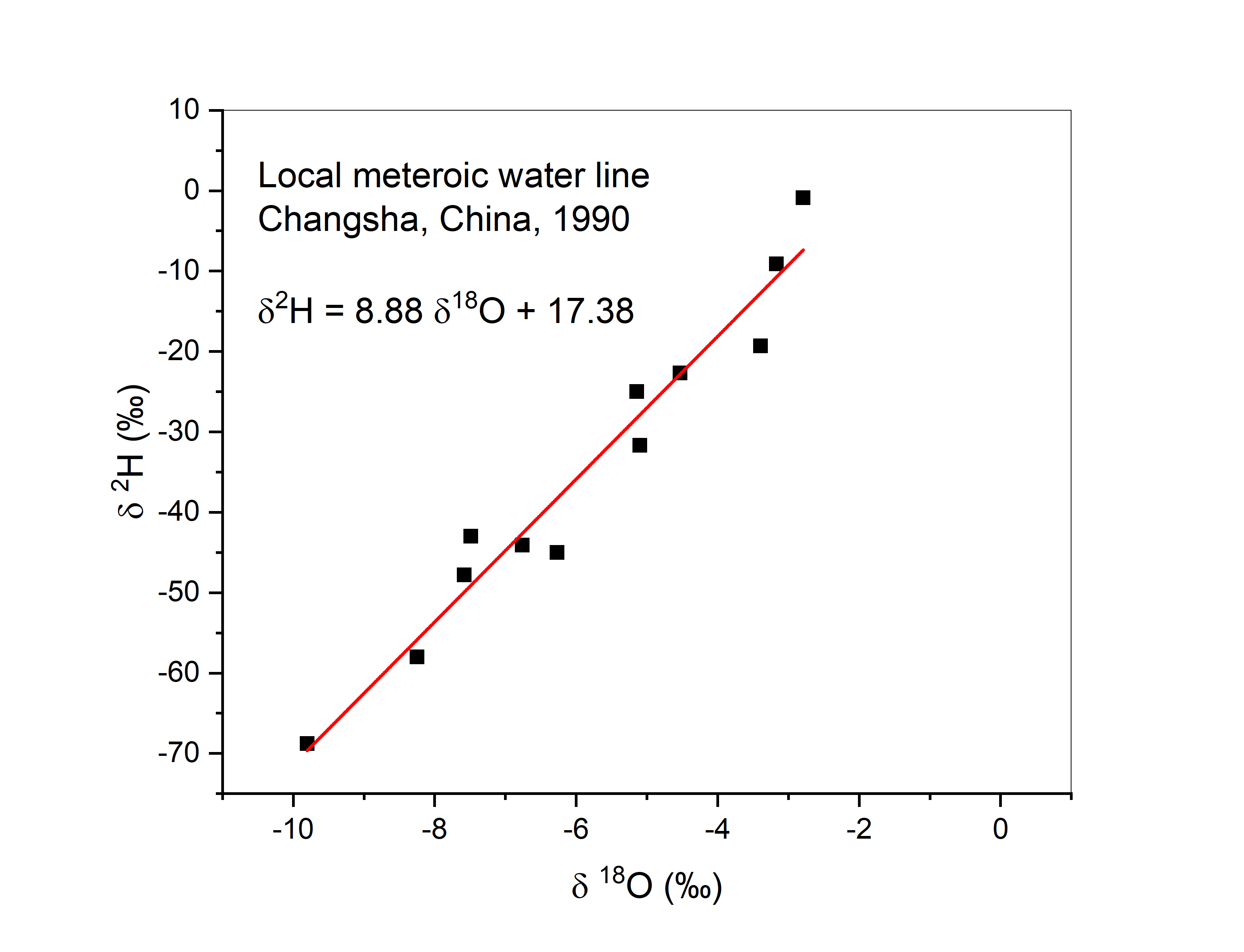
Local meteoric water line of Changsha, Hunan, Central China, 1990. Data are monthly ^{18}O and ^{2}H values from precipitation monitored at the local station (n = 12).

== Applications ==
Craig observed that δ^{18}O and δ^{2}H isotopic composition of cold meteoric water from sea ice in the Arctic and Antarctica are much more negative than that in warm meteoric water from the tropics. A correlation between temperature (T) and δ^{18}O was proposed later in the 1970s. This correlation is then applied to study changes in surface temperature over time. The δ^{18}O of ancient meteoric water, preserved in ice cores, can also be collected and applied to reconstruct paleoclimate.

A meteoric water line can be calculated for a given area, named as the local meteoric water line (LMWL), and used as a baseline within that area. The local meteoric water line can differ from the global meteoric water line in its slope and intercept. Such a deviated slope and intercept are largely a result of relative humidity.

In 1964, the concept of deuterium excess $d$ was proposed.

$$d = \delta^{2}\ce H - 8\cdot\delta^{18}\ce O$$

Later, a parameter of deuterium excess as a function of humidity has been established; as such, the isotopic composition in local meteoric water can be applied to trace local relative humidity, study local climate and used as a tracer of climate change.

In hydrogeology, the δ^{18}O and δ^{2}H of groundwater are often used to study the origin of groundwater and groundwater recharge.

It has been shown that, even taking into account the standard deviation related to instrumental errors and the natural variability of the amount-weighted precipitations, the LMWL calculated with the EIV (error in variable regression) method has no differences on the slope compared to classic OLSR (ordinary least square regression) or other regression methods. However, for certain purposes such as the evaluation of the shifts from the line of the geothermal waters, it would be more appropriate to calculate the so-called "prediction interval" or "error wings" related to LMWL.

== See also ==
- Isotope fractionation
- Meteoric water
- Vienna Standard Mean Ocean Water (VSMOW water stable isotopes standard)
- Water cycle
