= Vienna Standard Mean Ocean Water =

Standard defining the isotopic composition of ocean water

Vienna Standard Mean Ocean Water (VSMOW) is an isotopic standard for water, that is, a particular sample of water whose proportions of different isotopes of hydrogen and oxygen are accurately known. VSMOW is distilled from ocean water and does not contain salt or other impurities. Published and distributed by the Vienna-based International Atomic Energy Agency in 1968, the standard and its essentially identical successor, VSMOW2, continue to be used as a reference material.

Water samples made up of different isotopes of hydrogen and oxygen have slightly different physical properties. As an extreme example, heavy water, which contains two deuterium (^{2}H) atoms instead of the usual, lighter hydrogen-1 (^{1}H), has a melting point of 3.82 °C (38.88 °F) and boiling point of 101.4 °C (214.5 °F). Different rates of evaporation cause water samples from different places in the water cycle to contain slightly different ratios of isotopes. Ocean water (richer in heavy isotopes) and rain water (poorer in heavy isotopes) roughly represent the two extremes found on Earth. With VSMOW, the IAEA simultaneously published an analogous standard for rain water, Standard Light Antarctic Precipitation (SLAP), and eventually its successor SLAP2. SLAP contains about 5 % less oxygen-18 and 42.8 % less deuterium than VSMOW.

A scale based on VSMOW and SLAP is used to report oxygen-18 and deuterium concentrations. From 2005 until its redefinition in 2019, the kelvin was specified to be 1/273.16 of the temperature of specifically VSMOW at its triple point.

== History and background ==
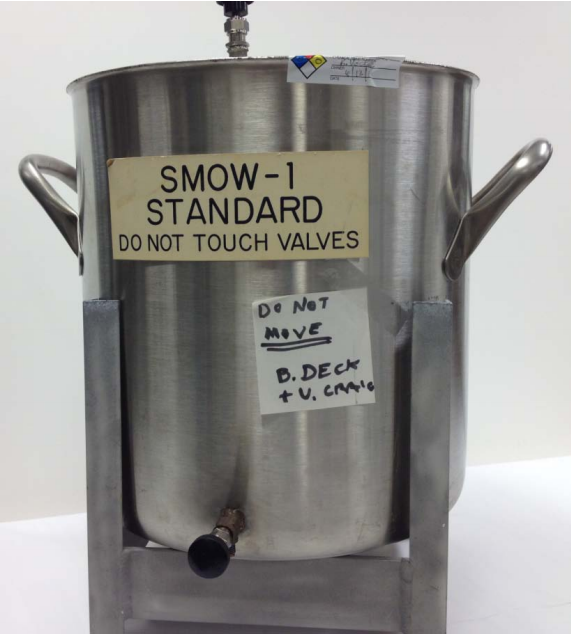
The original container of VSMOW (then called SMOW-1) collected by Harmon Craig

Abundances of a particular isotope in a substance are usually given relative to some reference material, as a delta in parts per thousand (‰) from the reference. For example, the ratio of deuterium (^{2}H) to hydrogen-1 in a substance x may be given as

$$\delta\,^2\mathrm{H}_{x/\text{reference}} = \left(\frac{(^2\mathrm{H} / ^1\mathrm{H})_x}{(^2\mathrm{H} / ^1\mathrm{H})_\text{reference}}-1\right)\times 1000 \text{ ‰}$$,

where $(^2\mathrm{H} / ^1\mathrm{H})_x$ denotes the absolute concentration in x.

In 1961, pursuing a standard for measuring and reporting deuterium and oxygen-18 concentrations, Harmon Craig of the Scripps Institution of Oceanography in San Diego, California, proposed an abstract water standard. He based the proportions on his measurements of samples taken by Epstein & Mayeda (1953) of ocean waters around the world. Approximating an average of their measurements, Craig defined his "standard mean ocean water" (SMOW) relative to a water sample held in the United States' National Bureau of Standards called NBS-1 (sampled from the Potomac River). In particular, SMOW had the following parameters relative to NBS-1:

- δ ^{2}H _{SMOW/NBS-1} = 50 ‰, i.e., an enrichment of 5 %;
- δ ^{18}O _{SMOW/NBS-1} = 8 ‰, i.e., an enrichment of 0.8 %.

Later, researchers at the California Institute of Technology defined another abstract reference, also called "SMOW", for oxygen-18 concentrations, such that a sample of Potsdam Sandstone in their possession satisfied δ^{18}O _{sandstone/SMOW} = 15.5 ‰.

To resolve the confusion, November 1966 meeting of the Vienna-based International Atomic Energy Agency (IAEA) recommended the preparation of two water isotopic standards: Vienna SMOW (VSMOW; initially just "SMOW" but later disambiguated) and Standard Light Antarctic Precipitation (SLAP). Craig prepared VSMOW by mixing distilled Pacific Ocean water with small amounts of other waters. VSMOW was intended to match the SMOW standard as closely as possible. Craig's measurements found an identical ^{18}O concentration and a 0.2 ‰ lower ^{2}H concentration. The SLAP standard was created from a melted firn sample from Plateau Station in Antarctica. A standard with oxygen-18 and deuterium concentrations between that of VSMOW and SLAP, called Greenland Ice Sheet Precipitation (GISP), was also prepared. The IAEA began distributing samples in 1968, and Gonfiantini (1978) compiled analyses of VSMOW and SLAP from 45 laboratories around the world. The VSMOW sample was stored in a stainless-steel container under nitrogen and was transferred to glass ampoules in 1977.

The deuterium and oxygen-18 concentrations in VSMOW are close to the upper end of naturally occurring materials, and the concentrations in SLAP are close to the lower end. Due to confusion over multiple water standards, the Commission on Isotopic Abundances and Atomic Weights recommended in 1994 that all future isotopic measurements of oxygen-18 (^{18}O) and deuterium (^{2}H) be reported relative to VSMOW, on a scale such that the δ^{18}O of SLAP is −55.5 ‰ and the δ^{2}H of SLAP is −428 ‰, relative to VSMOW. Therefore, SLAP is defined to contain 94.45 % the oxygen-18 concentration and 57.2 % the deuterium concentration of VSMOW. Using a scale with two defined samples improves comparison of results between laboratories.

In December 1996, because of a dwindling supply of VSMOW, the IAEA decided to create a replacement standard, VSMOW2. Published in 1999, it contains a nearly identical isotopic mixture. About 300 liters was prepared from a mixture of distilled waters, from Lake Bracciano in Italy, the Sea of Galilee in Israel, and a well in Egypt, in proportions chosen to reach VSMOW isotopic ratios. The IAEA also published a successor to SLAP, called SLAP2, derived from melted water from four Antarctic drilling sites. Deviations of ^{17}O, and ^{18}O in the new standards from the old standards are zero within the error of measurement. There is a small but measurable deviation of ^{2}H concentration in SLAP2 from SLAP—δ^{2}H_{SLAP2/VSMOW} is defined to be −427.5 ‰ instead of −428 ‰—but not in VSMOW2 from VSMOW. The IAEA recommends that measurements still be reported on the VSMOW–SLAP scale.

SLAP is kept at the IAEA, and VSMOW is sold by the U.S. Geological Survey.

== Measurements ==
All measurements are reported with their standard uncertainty. Measurements of particular combinations of oxygen and hydrogen isotopes are unnecessary because water molecules constantly exchange atoms with each other.

=== VSMOW ===
Except for tritium, which was determined by the helium gas emitted by radioactive decay, these measurements were taken using mass spectroscopy.

- Deuterium (^{2}H / ^{1}H) – 155.76±0.05 ppm, about 1 in 6420 hydrogen atoms
- Tritium (^{3}H / ^{1}H) – 18.5±3.6 TU (Note: TU is tritium units, or tritium atoms per 10^{18} hydrogen atoms.) = (1.85±0.36)×10^{−11} ppm, measured on 16 September 1976, about 1 in 5.40×10^{16} hydrogen atoms
- Oxygen-18 (^{18}O / ^{16}O) – 2005.20±0.45 ppm, about 1 in 499 oxygen atoms
- Oxygen-17 (^{17}O / ^{16}O) – 379.9±0.8 ppm, about 1 in 2640 oxygen atoms

VSMOW has a molar mass of 18.015268(2) g/mol.

=== SLAP ===
Based on the results of Gonfiantini (1978), the IAEA defined the delta scale with SLAP at −55.5 ‰ for ^{18}O and −428 ‰ for ^{2}H. That is, SLAP was measured to contain approximately 5.55 % less oxygen-18 and 42.8 % less deuterium than does VSMOW, and these figures were used to anchor the scale at two points. Experimental figures are given below.

- ^{2}H / ^{1}H – 89.02±0.05 ppm, δ := −428.5 ± 0.4 ‰, about 1 in 11230 atoms
- ^{3}H / ^{1}H – 374±9 TU = (3.74±0.09)×10^{−10} ppm, measured on 16 September 1976, about 1 in 2.67 × 10^{15} atoms
- ^{18}O / ^{16}O – 1893.91±0.45 ppm, δ := −55.5 ‰, about 1 in 528 atoms
- ^{17}O / ^{16}O – δ = −28.86 ± 0.1 ‰, about 1 in 3700 atoms

=== VSMOW2 and SLAP2 ===
The concentrations of ^{17}O, and ^{18}O are indistinguishable between VSMOW and VSMOW2, and between SLAP and SLAP2. The specification sheet gives the standard errors in these measurements. The concentration of ^{2}H is unchanged in VSMOW2 as well, but is slightly increased in SLAP2. The IAEA reports:

- δ^{2}H_{SLAP2/VSMOW} = −427.5 ± 0.3 ‰, (Compare −428 ‰ for SLAP.)

On 6 July 2007, the tritium concentration was 3.5±1.0 TU in VSMOW2, and 27.6±1.6 TU in SLAP2.

=== GISP ===
- δ ^{2}H _{GISP} = −189.5 ± 1.2 ‰
- δ ^{18}O _{GISP} = −24.66 ± 0.09 ‰
- δ ^{17}O _{GISP} = −12.71 ± 0.1 ‰

== Applications ==
=== Reporting isotopic ratios ===
The VSMOW–SLAP scale is recommended by the USGS, IUPAC, and IAEA for measurement of deuterium and ^{18}O concentrations in any substance. For ^{18}O, a scale based on Vienna Pee Dee Belemnite can also be used. The physical samples, which are distributed by the IAEA and U.S. National Institute of Standards and Technology, are used to calibrate isotope-measuring equipment.

Variations in isotopic content are useful in hydrology, meteorology, and oceanography. Different parts of the ocean do have slightly different isotopic concentrations: δ ^{18}O values range from –11.35 ‰ in water off the coast of Greenland to +1.3 ‰ in the north Atlantic, and δ ^{2}H concentrations in deep ocean water range from roughly –1.7 ‰ near Antarctica to +2.2 ‰ in the Arctic. Variations are much larger in surface water than in deep water.

=== Temperature measurements ===
In 1954, the International Committee for Weights and Measures (CIPM) established the definition of the Kelvin as 1/273.16 of the absolute temperature of the triple point of water. Waters with different isotopic compositions had slightly different triple points. Thus, the International Committee for Weights and Measures specified in 2005 that the definition of the kelvin temperature scale would refer to water with a composition of the nominal specification of VSMOW. The decision was welcomed in 2007 by Resolution 10 of the 23rd CGPM. The triple point is measured in triple-point cells, where the water is held at its triple point and allowed to reach equilibrium with its surroundings. Using ordinary waters, the range of inter-laboratory measurements of the triple point can be about 250 μK. With VSMOW, the inter-laboratory range of measurements of the triple point is about 50 μK.

After the 2019 revision of the SI, the kelvin is defined in terms of the Boltzmann constant, which makes its definition completely independent of the properties of water. The defined value for the Boltzmann constant was selected so that the measured value of the VSMOW triple point is identical to the prior defined value, within measurable accuracy. Triple-point cells remain a practical method of calibrating thermometers.

== See also ==
- Global meteoric water line
- International Temperature Scale of 1990
- Properties of water

== Sources ==
- Baertschi, P. (August 1976). "Absolute ^{18}O content of standard mean ocean water". Earth and Planetary Science Letters. 31 (3): 341–344. doi:10.1016/0012-821X(76)90115-1.
- Coplen, Tyler B. (1994). "Reporting of stable hydrogen, carbon, and oxygen isotopic abundances (Technical Report)" (PDF). Pure and Applied Chemistry. 66 (2): 273–276. doi:10.1351/pac199466020273.
- Coplen, Tyler B. (May 1995). "Discontinuance of SMOW and PDB". Nature. 375 (6529): 285. doi:10.1038/375285a0.
- Craig, Harmon (9 June 1961). "Standard for Reporting Concentrations of Deuterium and Oxygen-18 in Natural Waters". Science. 133 (3467): 1833–1834. doi:10.1126/science.133.3467.1833.
- Epstein, S.; Mayeda, T. (1 November 1953). "Variation of ^{18}O content of waters from natural sources". Geochimica et Cosmochimica Acta. 4 (5): 213–224. doi:10.1016/0016-7037(53)90051-9.
- Gonfiantini, R. (February 1978). "Standards for stable isotope measurements in natural compounds". Nature. 271 (5645): 534–536. doi:10.1038/271534a0.
- Li, Wenjun; Ni, Baoling; Jin, Deqiu; Zhang, Qinglian (1988). "Measurement of the absolute abundance of oxygen-17 in V-SMOW". 科学通报 (英文版) [Science Bulletin (English Edition)] (19): 1610–1613.
- Hagemann, R.; Nief, G.; Roth, E. (1970). "Absolute isotopic scale for deuterium analysis of natural waters. Absolute D/H ratio for SMOW". Tellus A. 22 (6): 712. doi:10.3402/tellusa.v22i6.10278.
- "Advisory Meeting on Stable Isotope Reference Samples for Geochemical and Hydrological Investigations" (PDF). International Atomic Energy Agency. March 1984.
- "Reference Sheet for International Measurement Standards" (PDF). International Atomic Energy Agency. December 2006. Archived from the original (PDF) on 2020-07-29.
- "Reference Sheet for International Measurement Standards" (PDF). International Atomic Energy Agency. July 2017.
- "Reference Sheet for Reference Material GISP" (PDF). International Atomic Energy Agency. August 2007.
- "Atomic Weights of the Elements: Review 1993" (PDF). Pure and Applied Chemistry. 66 (22). Commission on Isotopic Abundances and Atomic Weights: 2423–2444. 1994.
- "Atomic Weights of the Elements: Review 2000" (PDF). Pure and Applied Chemistry. 75 (6). Commission on Isotopic Abundances and Atomic Weights: 683–800. 2000.
- Lin, Y.; Clayton, R. N. (2010). "Calibration of δ^{17}O and δ^{18}O of international measurement standards – VSMOW, VSMOW2, SLAP, and SLAP2". Rapid Communications in Mass Spectrometry. 24 (6): 773–776. doi:10.1002/rcm.4449.
- "Kelvin: Present Realization". National Institute of Science and Technology. 8 July 2021.
- "Report of Stable Isotopic Composition Reference Material SLAP2 – 0.25 μL" (PDF). United States Geological Service. 9 July 2020.
- Ferronsky, V. I.; Polyakov, V. A. (6 March 2012). Isotopes of the Earth's Hydrosphere. Springer Science & Business Media.
