= Magmatic water =

Aqueous phase of minerals that have been dissolved by magma

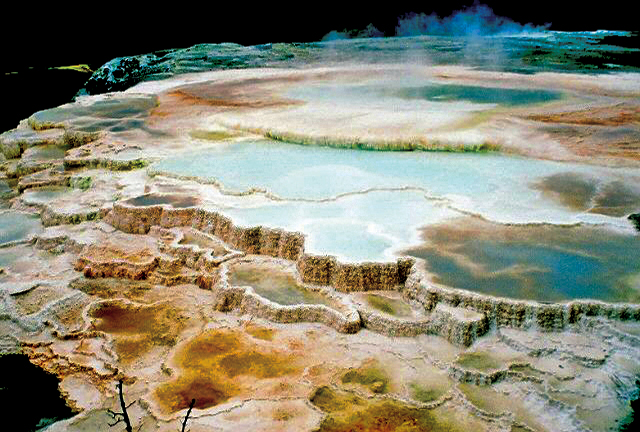
Mammoth Hot Springs in Yellowstone National Park (Wyoming)

Magmatic water, also known as juvenile water, is an aqueous phase in equilibrium with minerals that have been dissolved by magma deep within the Earth's crust and is released to the atmosphere during a volcanic eruption. It plays a key role in assessing the crystallization of igneous rocks, particularly silicates, as well as the rheology and evolution of magma chambers. Magma is composed of minerals, crystals and volatiles in varying relative natural abundance. Magmatic differentiation varies significantly based on various factors, most notably the presence of water. An abundance of volatiles within magma chambers decreases viscosity and leads to the formation of minerals bearing halogens, including chloride and hydroxide groups. In addition, the relative abundance of volatiles varies within basaltic, andesitic, and rhyolitic magma chambers, leading to some volcanoes being exceedingly more explosive than others. Magmatic water is practically insoluble in silicate melts but exhibits the highest solubility in rhyolitic melts. An abundance of magmatic water has been shown to lead to high-grade deformation, as a result of altering the composition of hydrogen isotope geochemistry (δ^{2}H) and stable oxygen isotope ratios (δ^{18}O) within host rocks.

== Composition ==
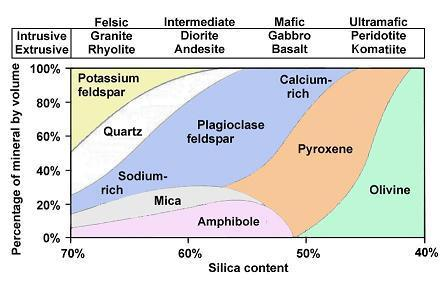
Mineralogic composition of rhyolitic, andesitic, and basaltic magmas

Magma exists in three main forms that vary in composition. When magma crystallizes within the crust, it forms an extrusive igneous rock. Dependent on the composition of the magma, it may form either rhyolite, andesite, or basalt. Volatiles, particularly water and carbon dioxide, significantly impact the behavior of each form of magma differently.^{,} Magma with a high concentration of volatiles has a significant reduction in temperature of up to hundreds of degrees, which reduces its inherent viscosity. The behavior of magma is also altered by varying mineralogic compositions, which is noted in the figure. For instance, magmatic water leads to the crystallization of several minerals abundant in hydroxyl- or halogenated groups, including garnets. Analyses of these minerals can be used to analyze the conditions of formation in the interior of rocky planets.^{,}

=== Volatiles ===
Volatiles are present in nearly all magma in different concentrations. Examples of volatiles within magma include water, carbon dioxide, and halogen gases. High pressures allow these volatiles to stay relatively stable within solution. However, over time, as the magmatic pressure decreases, volatiles will rise out of solution in the gaseous phase, further decreasing the magmatic pressure. These pressure differences cause drastic differences in the volume of a magma. Pressure difference causes some forms of volcanoes to be highly explosive and others to be effusive.

=== Mineralogy ===
An example of a mineral containing hydroxyl groups is garnet. Garnet is an anhydrous mineral commonly analyzed within geological subdisciplines because of its general stability. One study analyzed the presence of garnets within the upper mantle through infrared spectroscopy and showed absorption at approximately 3500 cm^{−1}, which is consistent with the presence of hydroxyl groups. These garnets have been shown to vary in composition dependent on its geographic origin. One particular study in Southern Africa determined concentrations ranging from 1 to 135 ppm. However, this is significantly lower than the hydroxyl content in regions such as the Colorado Plateau. It was also demonstrated that there is an inverse correlation regarding the concentration of OH and Mg + Fe.

=== Basaltic magma ===
Basaltic magma is the most abundant in iron, magnesium, and calcium but the lowest in silica, potassium, and sodium.^{,} The composition of silica within basaltic magma ranges from 45 to 55 % mass fraction (wt.%), or mass fraction of a species. It forms in temperatures ranging from approximately 1830 °F to 2200 °F.^{,} Basaltic magma has the lowest viscosity and volatiles content, yet still may be up to 100,000 times more viscous than water. Because of its low viscosity, this is the least explosive form of magma. Basaltic magma may found in regions such as Hawaii, known for its shield volcanoes.^{,}

Basaltic magma forms minerals such as calcium-rich plagioclase feldspar and pyroxene. The water composition of basaltic magma varies dependent on the evolution of the magma chamber. Arc magmas, such as Izarú in Costa Rica, range from 3.2 to 3.5 wt.%.

=== Andesitic magma ===
Andesitic magma is an intermediate magma and is approximately evenly dispersed regarding iron, magnesium, calcium, sodium, and potassium. The silica composition of andesitic magma ranges from 55 to 65 wt.%. It forms in temperatures ranging from approximately 1470 °F to 1830 °F.^{,} Andesitic magma has an intermediate viscosity and volatiles content. It forms minerals such as plagioclase feldspar, mica, and amphibole.

=== Rhyolitic magma ===
Rhyolitic magma is felsic and the most abundant in silica, potassium, and sodium but the lowest in iron, magnesium, and calcium. The silica composition of rhyolitic magma ranges from 65 to 75 wt.%. It forms in the lowest temperature range, from about 1200 °F to 1470 °F.^{,} Rhyolitic magma has the highest viscosity and gas content. It produces the most explosive volcanic eruptions, including the catastrophic eruption of Mount Vesuvius. It forms minerals such as orthoclase feldspar, sodium-rich plagioclase feldspar, quartz, mica, and amphibole.

== Water in silicate melts ==
Precipitation of minerals is affected by water solubility within silicate melts, which typically exists as hydroxyl groups bound to Si^{4+} or Group 1 and Group 2 cations in concentrations ranging approximately from 6 to 7 wt.%.^{,} Specifically, the equilibrium of water and dissolved oxygen yields hydroxides, where the K_{eq} has been approximated between 0.1 and 0.3.

This inherent solubility is low yet varies greatly depending on the pressure of the system. Rhyolitic magmas have the highest solubility, ranging from approximately 0% at the surface to nearly 10% at 1100 °C and 5 kbar. Degassing occurs when hydrous magma is uplifted, gradually converting the dissolved water to aqueous phase. This aqueous phase is typically abundant in volatiles, metals (copper, lead, zinc, silver and gold), and group-1 and group-2 cations. Dependent on which cation the hydroxyl is bound to, it significantly impacts the properties of a volcanic eruption, particularly its explosiveness. During unusually high temperature and pressure conditions exceeding 374 °C and 218 bar, water enters a supercritical fluid state and becomes no longer a liquid or a gas.

== Stable isotope data ==
Isotopic data from various locations within the Mid-Atlantic Ridge indicates the presence of mafic-to-felsic intrusive igneous rocks, including gabbro, diorite, and plagiogranite. These rocks showed high-grade metamorphism because of the presence of magmatic water, exceeding 600 °C. This deformation depleted host rocks of ^{18}O, leading to further analysis of the ratio of ^{18}O to ^{16}O (δ^{18}O).

Water in equilibrium with igneous melts should bear the same isotopic signature for ^{18}O and δ^{2}H. However, isotopic studies of magmatic water have demonstrated similarities to meteoric water, indicating circulation of magmatic and meteoric groundwater systems.

Isotopic analyses of fluid inclusions indicate a wide range of δ^{18}O and δ^{2}H content. Studies within these environments have shown an abundance of ^{18}O and depletion in ^{2}H relative to SMOW and meteoric waters. Within ore deposits, fluid inclusion data showed that δ^{18}O vs δ^{2}H values are within the expected range.

== See also ==
- Connate fluids
