= Hatsu =

Hatsu is both a Japanese surname and a unisex Japanese given name, meaning "beginning". Notable people with the name include:

- Akiko Hatsu (波津 彬子, born 1959), Japanese manga artist
- Hatsu Hioki (日沖 発, born 1983), Japanese wrestler
- Hatsu Ando (安藤 はつ, 1912 – 1985), Japanese politician
- Hatsu Imai (今井 はつ, 1901 – 1971), Japanese teacher, journalist and politician
- Hatsune Miku (Vocaloid by Crypton Future Media)

== See also ==
- Hatsu Marine Ltd. (U.K.), AKA Hatsu Shipping, a former subsidiary of Evergreen Marine
