= John Thompson (Australian footballer, born 1903) =

Australian rules footballer, born 1903

Personal information
- Full name: John Thompson
- Born: 3 April 1903
- Died: 15 December 1985 (aged 82)
- Original team: South Ballarat
- Height: 182 cm (6 ft 0 in)
- Weight: 74 kg (163 lb)

Playing career^{1}
Years	Club	Games (Goals)
1929–30	North Melbourne	14 (1)
- ^{1} Playing statistics correct to the end of 1930.

John Thompson (3 April 1903 – 15 December 1985) was an Australian rules footballer who played with North Melbourne in the Victorian Football League (VFL).

Thompson received a VFL permit in July 1929 after previously playing with South Ballarat.
