= Mick Howell (Australian footballer) =

Australian rules footballer

Personal information
- Full name: Michael Leo Howell
- Born: 6 July 1946
- Died: 25 December 1985 (aged 39)
- Height: 191 cm (6 ft 3 in)
- Weight: 86 kg (190 lb)
- Position: Ruck

Playing career^{1}
Years	Club	Games (Goals)
1967–70	North Melbourne	53 (15)
- ^{1} Playing statistics correct to the end of 1970.

Michael Leo Howell (6 July 1946 – 25 December 1985) was an Australian rules footballer who played with North Melbourne in the Victorian Football League (VFL).
