= Clara Lynch =

American biologist and cancer researcher

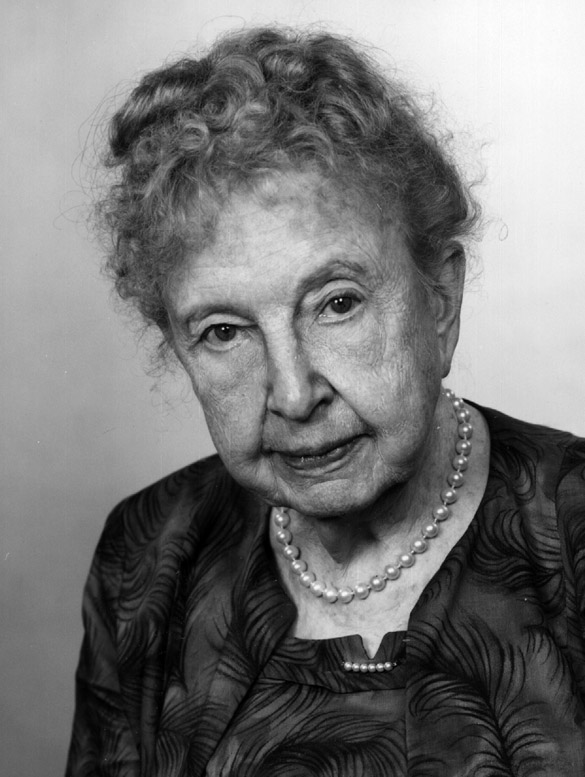
- Born: March 6, 1882; Canton, Ohio
- Died: December 8, 1985 (aged 103); Arlington County, Virginia
- Education: Smith College; Columbia University
- Scientific career
- Fields: Biology, cancer research
- Institutions: Rockefeller Institute for Medical Research

Clara J. Lynch (March 6, 1882 – December 8, 1985) was an American biologist and cancer researcher, who notably pioneered the use of the Swiss laboratory mouse in cancer research.

== Background ==
Clara Lynch was born on March 6, 1882, in Canton, Ohio, and died on December 8, 1985, in Arlington, Virginia, at the age of 103. She never married but did have two nieces named Marcia and Eliza Miller. Lynch was born to her parents William A. Lynch and Eliza R. Underhill. Her father was a prominent attorney during his time. Lynch had two other siblings named Alice Allen Lynch and Frances H. Lynch, both of whom also lived to adulthood.

== Education ==
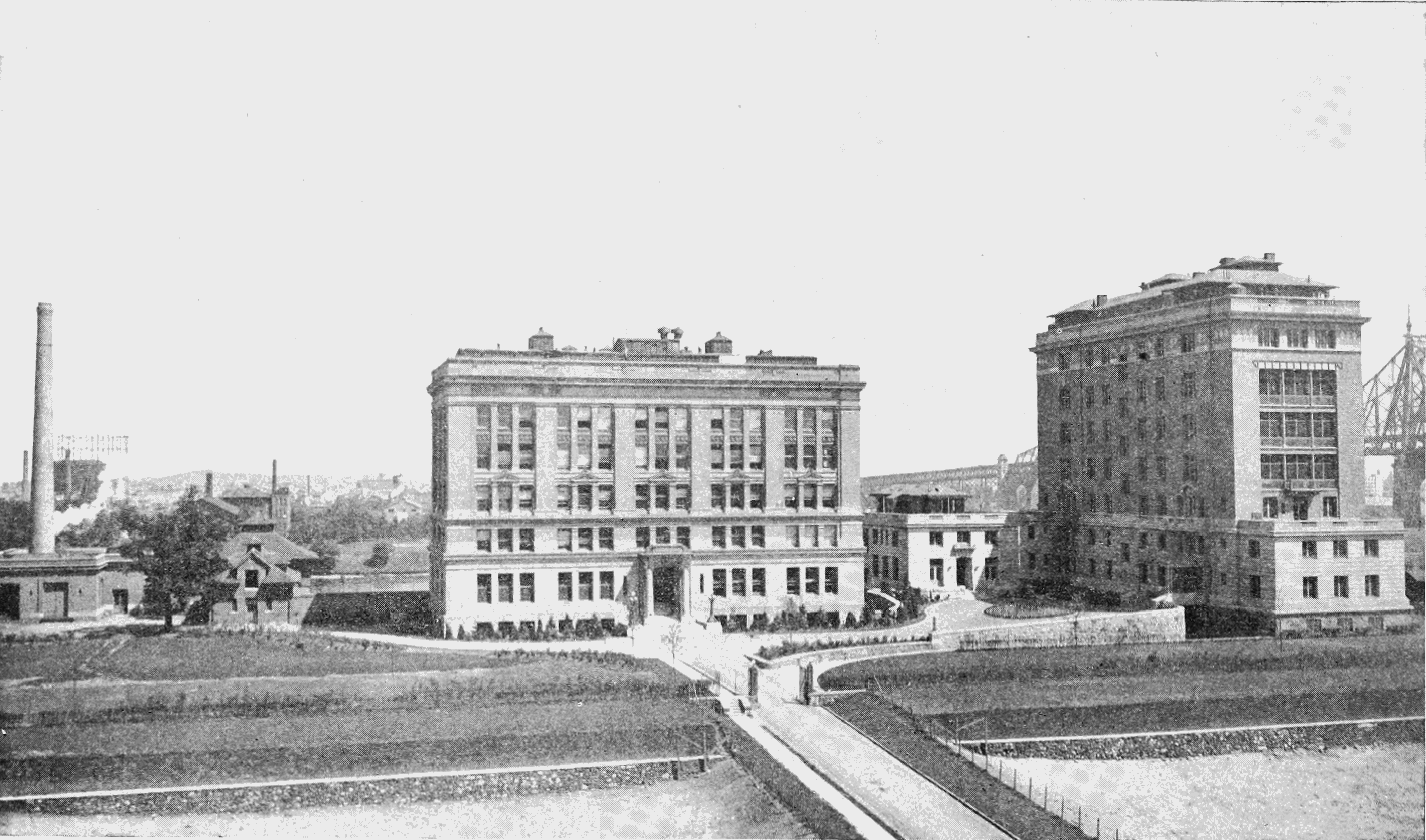
Rockefeller Institute for Medical Research in 1912

Lynch received a Bachelor of Arts degree from Smith College in 1902 and continued on to receive her doctorate degree from Columbia University in 1919. In 1918, she became a part of the Rockefeller Institute for Medical Research as a member of the faculty, which she served for 53 years. This institute is now known as Rockefeller University. Lynch taught anatomy and physiology of mammalian species while at Smith College. While at Columbia University, Lynch worked under the notable Thomas Hunt Morgan.

== Contributions ==
During the early parts of Lynch’s career, the field of cancer research was growing rapidly, and may scientists were making huge advancements in the understanding of this disease. She joined this field when she began her work as a faculty member at the Rockefeller Institute for Medical Research under James B. Murphy. Lynch was one of the first female scientists to study cancer. In the beginning, she studied mammary tumors in mice noting that some mice formed tumors more rapidly and spontaneously than others. She came to conclude that developing tumors was an inherited trait. To prove that the trait was inherited, Lynch used the descendants of the original mice she bred. Lynch also looked at tumors in the lungs of these mice, also coming to the conclusion that the tendency to accumulate tumors in both the mammary and lung tissue resulted from dominant inherited traits, with no difference in the conclusions between tumors that occurred naturally and those that were experimentally produced. Lynch's work was often doubted by other scientific experts during this time.

Lynch is also given credit for pioneering her so-called albino Swiss mouse, which she used as test subjects for experiments. She actually brought back this albino Swiss mouse in 1926 from Lausanne, Switzerland, because it was easily bred in the laboratory. Dr André de Coulon (1890–1935), then a founding scientific director of the Centre Anti-Cancereux Romand (CACR), gave her nine (7 females and 2 males) mice from his colony raised there since 1924 (date of the CACR – Swiss Institute for Experimental Cancer Research, ISREC inception). Lynch famously brought the mice in a shoebox aboard the ship Orduña (a crossing from Cherbourg in France to New York lasting 13 days, September 1–13, 1926). The mice were not proceeded through customs with any permit from the Department of Agriculture. Lynch often bred the mice and distributed them to other laboratories for research. The descendants of this type of mouse are widely used in research today.

== Scientific advancements ==
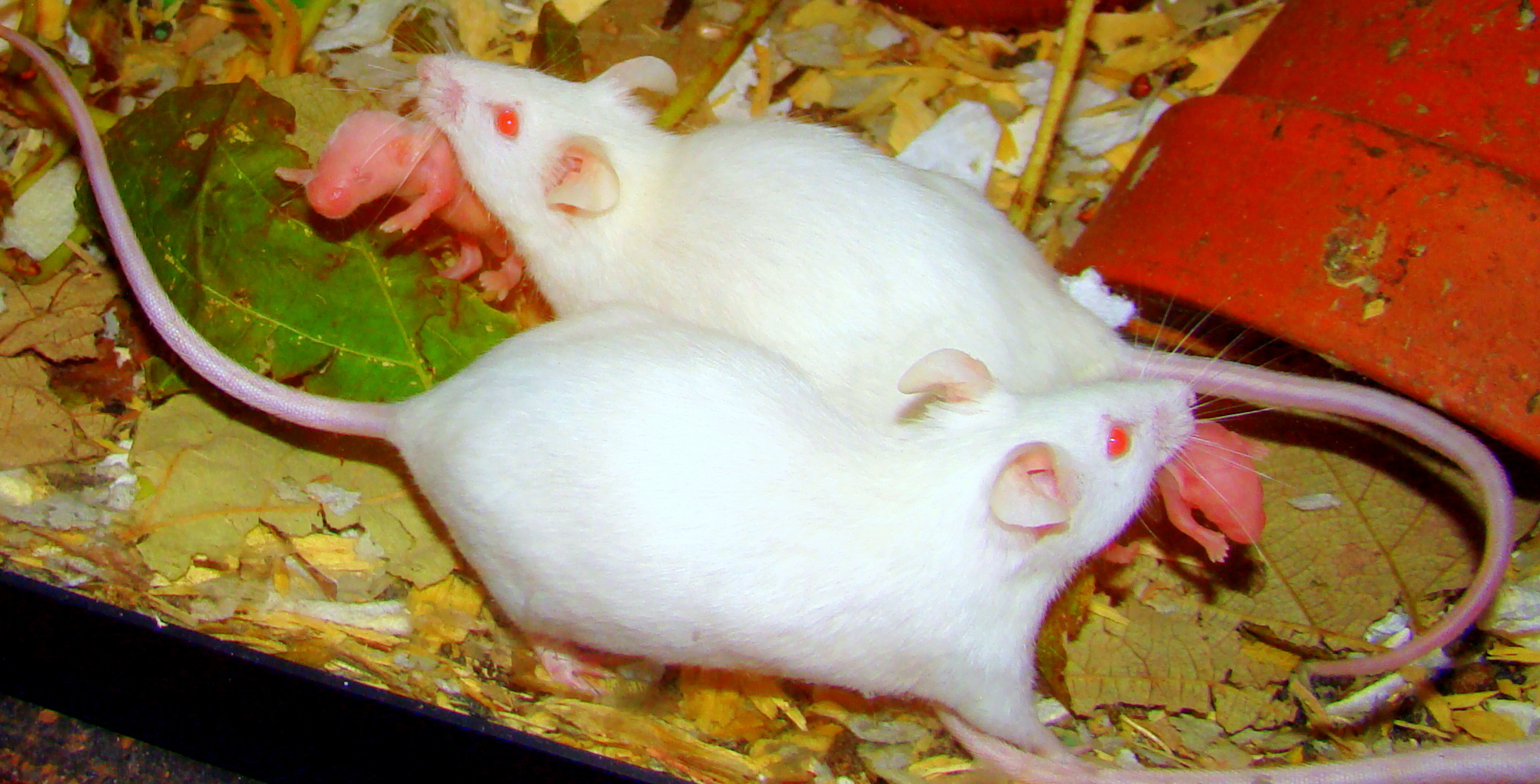
Example of the mice used by Clara Lynch during her tests of susceptibility on inheriting cancer or other diseases.

One well-known research article written by Lynch is entitled "The Inheritance of Susceptibility to Yellow Fever Encephalitis in Mice", which was received on October 2, 1935. She performed this research on her Swiss mice that she had brought from Lausanne, Switzerland, in 1926 to the Rockefeller Institute of Medical Technology. In this study she looked at the importance of resistance for individuals related to the likelihood of attaining certain infectious diseases, and in this case specifically yellow fever. Some mice were more susceptible to diseases than others, and Lynch wanted to see how genetic factors influenced susceptibility to yellow fever encephalitis. Lynch worked with Thomas P. Hughes, a fellow scientist in the field, and together they discovered that the sex of the mice did not determine susceptibility to yellow fever, offspring from two susceptible parents were more likely to be susceptible to yellow fever than offspring who only had resistant parent, and that overall there are hereditary factors present in mice that attribute to susceptibility to yellow fever.
