= Wilf Cooke =

English footballer

Personal information
- Full name: Wilfred Hudson Cooke
- Date of birth: 5 October 1915
- Place of birth: Crewe, England
- Date of death: 18 December 1985 (aged 70)
- Place of death: Whitby, England
- Height: 5 ft 7 in (1.70 m)
- Position: Inside forward

Youth career
- Leeds United

Senior career*
Years	Team	Apps	(Gls)
1935–1938	Bradford City	21	(2)
1938–1939	Leeds United	0	(0)
1939–1946	Fulham	0	(0)
1946	Crewe Alexandra	12	(2)
- Nantwich Town
Total		33	(4)
- * Club domestic league appearances and goals

Wilfred Hudson Cooke (5 October 1915 – 18 December 1985) was an English professional footballer who played as an inside forward.

== Career ==
Born in Crewe, Cooke played for Leeds United and Bradford City. For Bradford City he made 21 appearances in the Football League, scoring 2 goals; he also scored 1 goal in 2 FA Cup appearances. He later played for Fulham. Known as Jimmy, he was on the books of Crewe Alexandra after the war, joining Nantwich Town as player-coach ahead of the inaugural season of the Mid-Cheshire League in 1948.

== Sources ==
- Frost, Terry (1988). Bradford City A Complete Record 1903-1988. Breedon Books Sport. ISBN 0-907969-38-0.
