= Tom Mercer (footballer) =

Australian rules footballer, born 1910

Personal information
- Full name: Thomas James Mercer
- Born: 20 August 1910; Long Gully, Victoria
- Died: 7 December 1985 (aged 75); Fitzroy, Victoria

Playing career^{1}
Years	Club	Games (Goals)
1933	Hawthorn	2 (0)
- ^{1} Playing statistics correct to the end of 1933.

Thomas James Mercer (20 August 1910 – 7 December 1985) was an Australian rules footballer who played with Hawthorn in the Victorian Football League (VFL).

Mercer later served in the Australian Army for four years during World War II.
