= Herbert Hyman =

American sociologist

- Born: Herbert Hiram Hyman; March 3, 1918; New York City, New York, United States
- Died: December 18, 1985 (aged 67); Canton, China
- Education: Columbia University (A.B., 1939; M.A., 1940; Ph.D., 1942)
- Known for: Research on opinion polling
- Spouse: Helen Kandel (m. 1945–1985)
- Children: Alex, David, and Lisa
- Scientific career
- Fields: Sociology
- Institutions: Columbia University; Wesleyan University
- Thesis: The psychology of status (1942)

Herbert Hiram Hyman (March 3, 1918 – December 18, 1985) was an American sociologist and expert on opinion polling. He taught at Columbia University from 1951 to 1969 and at Wesleyan University from 1969 to 1985. He died in Canton, China on December 18, 1985, four days after suffering a heart attack. He had been in China to deliver a series of lectures at Zhongshan University on sociology in developing countries.
