= Hatsue =

- Gender: Female

Origin
- Origin: Japanese
- Meaning: Different meanings depending on the kanji used

Hatsue (written: 初枝) is a feminine Japanese given name. Notable people with the name include:

- Hatsue Nagakubo-Takamizawa (長久保 初枝; born 1935), Japanese speed skater
- Hatsue Ono (1898–2012), Japanese supercentenarian
- Hatsue Yuasa (湯浅 初枝; born 1902), Japanese operatic soprano

== Fictional characters ==
- A young girl in The Sound of Waves by Yukio Mishima
- A young woman in Snow Falling on Cedars by David Guterson
