= Norm Matthews =

Australian rules footballer, born 1915

Personal information
- Full name: Norm Matthews
- Born: 30 August 1915
- Died: 30 December 1985 (aged 70)

Playing career^{1}
Years	Club	Games (Goals)
1935, 1942–44	Melbourne	15 (1)
1938–40	South Melbourne	28 (6)
Total		43 (7)
- ^{1} Playing statistics correct to the end of 1940.

Norm Matthews (30 August 1915 – 30 December 1985) was an Australian rules footballer who played with Melbourne and South Melbourne in the Victorian Football League (VFL).
