= Stanley Newnham =

English cricketer

Stanley William Newnham (7 April 1910 – 2 December 1985) was an English first-class cricketer active 1932 who played for Surrey. He was born in New Cross, London, and died in Rhuddlan, Flintshire.
