= Anatoly Nikolayevich Levchenko =

Hero of the Soviet Union

- Анатолий Николаевич Левченко
- Born: Anatoly Nikolayevich Levchenko; 6 February 1947
- Died: 27 December 1985 (aged 38); Salang Pass, Afghanistan
- Cause of death: killed by anti-aircraft fire from the Mujahideen
- Known for: Afghan war pilot to become Hero of the Soviet Union
- Awards: Hero of the Soviet Union
- Aviation career
- Air force: Soviet Air Force
- Battles: Soviet–Afghan War
- Rank: Lieutenant-Colonel

Anatoly Nikolayevich Levchenko (Russian: Анатолий Николаевич Левченко; 6 February 1947 – 27 December 1985) was a Soviet fighter pilot in the 655th Fighter Aviation Regiment of the 40th Army of the Turkestan Military District during the Soviet–Afghan War. He was posthumously made a Hero of the Soviet Union after his death in combat.

== Early life ==
Levchenko was born in Novonikolayevsky District in 1947 to working class parents, joining the Communist Party of the Soviet Union in 1969.

== Military service ==
Joining the Soviet Air Force in August 1964, Levchenko served in the 655th Fighter Aviation Regiment (IAP) flying the Mikoyan-Gurevich MiG-23MLD, based at Pärnu in Estonia. This unit was transferred to Kandahar airbase in Afghanistan in 1985, taking over from the 905th IAP, which returned to its home base at Taldy-Kurgan (now known as Taldıqorğan) in July 1985. The 905th IAP had suffered relatively light losses, losing only one aircraft in combat on the 23rd July 1985.

== Death ==
On the 27th December 1985, while flying a mission over the Salang Pass, Levchenko's aircraft was shot down by anti-aircraft fire from a DShK heavy machine gun, killing him. The aircraft, which carried the number 07, impacted the ground approximately 27 km North of Bagram.

This was the first combat loss for the 655th IAP, which would go on to lose four more aircraft in that year. The death of Levchenko and three other pilots in similar incidents led the 40th Army's air contingent to re-evaluate their tactics, leading to a new method of landing being employed which required a steep spiral descent made within the airfield's perimeters and the firing of flares on take off and landing.
