= Jadwiga Dzido =

Polish resistance worker

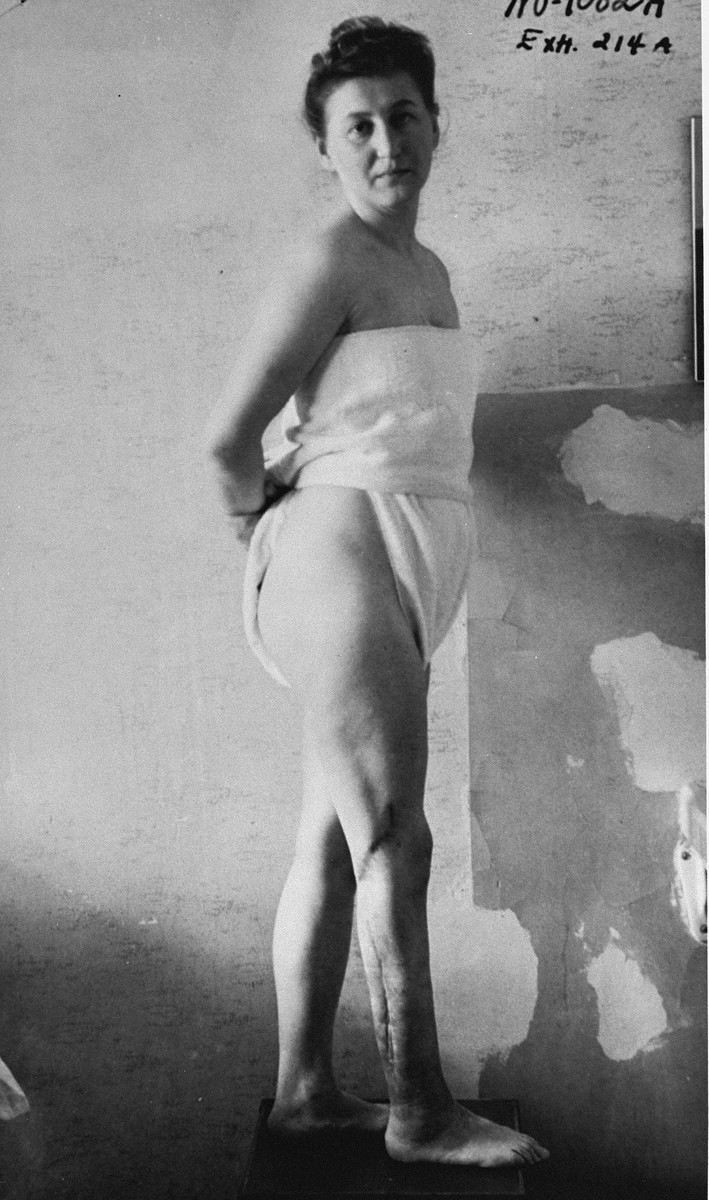
Photograph of Jadwiga Dzido revealing the scars on her leg caused by Nazi experiments entered as evidence in Doctors' Trial ca. 9 December 1946 - 20 August 1947

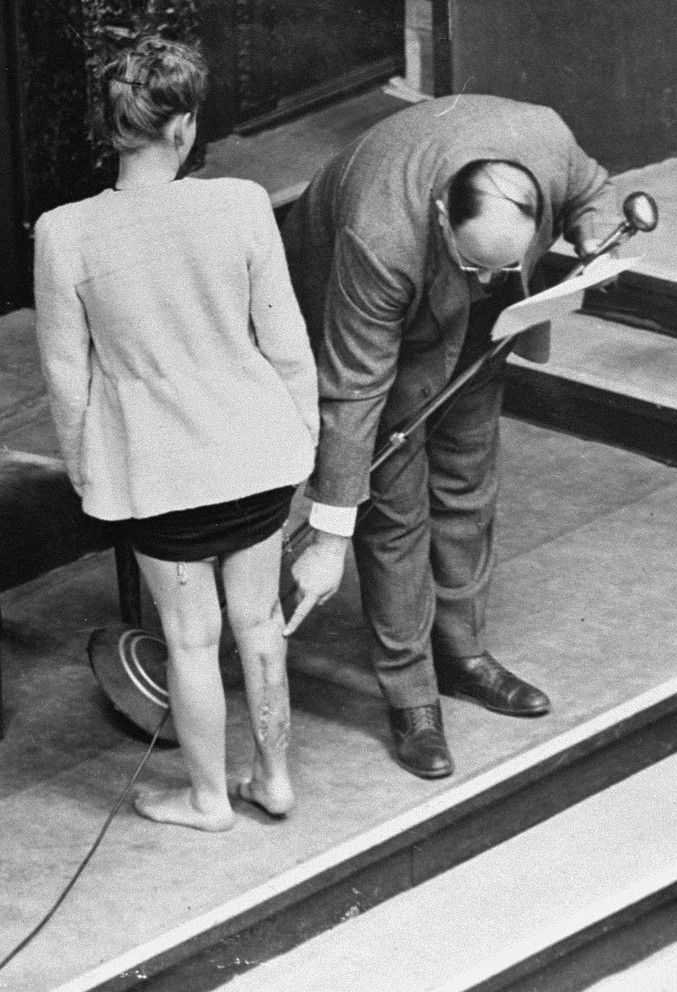
Jadwiga Dzido shows scars on her leg from medical experiments to the Doctors' Trial on 20 December 1946

Jadwiga Dzido (26 January 1918 – 10 December 1985) was a Polish resistance worker and pharmacy student who was arrested by the Gestapo in 1941 and deported to the Ravensbrück concentration camp where she was subjected to forced operations. She was infected with bacteria, dirt and slivers of glass to test the effects of sulphonamide on healing infected wounds. She subsequently became a witness at the 1946 Nuremberg trials.

== Biography ==
Born on 26 January 1918 in Suchowola, Jadwiga Dzido was the daughter of Katarzyna and Józef Dzido. She was brought up in Łuków in eastern Poland. After her father died in World War I, her mother worked in a pharmacy run by Teodozjusz Nowiński. Encouraged by Nowinski, she began studying at the University of Warsaw in 1938, hoping to earn a degree in pharmacy. After completing the first year, she was back in Łuków when war broke out. She joined the Union of Armed Struggle resistance movement, helping to distribute anti-fascist news articles.

The Gestapo arrested her on 28 March 1941 and sent her to Lublin Castle where she was tortured in the hope she would reveal names. On 21 September 1941, she was deported to Ravensbrück where in November 1942, together with nine other women, she was subjected to medical experiments designed to investigate the effects of sulphonamide drugs on wounds. Incisions were made on her leg which was infected with bacteria, dirt and glass splinters. She not only suffered a high fever and great pain, but an incision in her leg caused muscle atrophy and unconsciousness for an extended period. She escaped death as she was hidden by other prisoners under the floorboards until the remaining prisoners were released by the allies.

At the end of the war, Dzido returned home on crutches to find that her mother had been killed by bombing. The owner of the pharmacy, Nowinski, was murdered in the Auschwitz concentration camp. She returned to Warsaw where she completed her studies.

Dzido was a witness for the prosecution at the Doctors' Trial in Nuremberg which started in November 1946. She graduated as a pharmacist and worked at the University of Warsaw.

After completing her studies, Dzido worked for a pharmaceutical company in Warsaw. In 1951, she married Jósef Hass, a Polish army officer. They had two children. She died in Warsaw on 10 December 1985.
