= William Ishaya =

Member of the Assyrian Democratic Movement

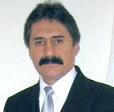

Dr. William Ishaya is an Iraqi diplomat and is currently the Deputy Permanent Representative - Mission of the Republic of Iraq to the United Nations in New York.

Ishaya was born to Assyrian parents Ishaya Odisho and Ester Odisho (daughter of the late Rev. Odisho Bet-Benyamin of St. Matthew Church in Sarsing, northern Iraq). He has 4 siblings: Gewargis, Christina, Marina and Ogen.

He spent his youth living at the K3 station in Haditha, while his father was employed at IPC (Iraq Petroleum Company). Later in his teenage years, he moved to Baghdad where he completed his post-graduate degree as a Veterinarian Surgeon at The University of Baghdad in 1980. While attending school in Baghdad, he married his Wife Victoria Borto in 1979. In 1980, he had his first child Ninos, which was later followed by the birth of Atour in 1982 and the youngest Banipal in 1984.

Because of his affiliation with The Iraqi Peoples Uprising in March 1991, his father was assassinated by Iraqi Intelligence (also known as “Mukhabarat”) under the Ex-Regime of Saddam Hussein. Continuing his activism, Mr. Ishaya became a Member of the Assyrian Democratic Movement as part of its leadership in party's Central Committee and was later put in charge of its Military Bureau Section. In 1993, he established the First Assyrian Battalion in the Assyrian Village of Feshkhabour within Nohadra, northern Iraq. Also, in 2002 he was elected as a Full Member of The Iraqi High Military Council in London, UK.

In 2004, he was employed by the Iraqi Ministry of Foreign Affairs. His first post began in Tokyo, Japan as the diplomat in charge of political affairs in 2005; later during his post, he was promoted to the rank of Charge de’ Affairs in 2009. Continuing his education, he achieved his master's degree in Political Science in 2007. In 2010, he returned to the Ministry of Foreign Affairs in Baghdad and began his assignment as The Director of NGO Section - Department of Human Rights. Currently, he is The Deputy Permanent Representative - Mission of the Republic of Iraq to the United Nations in New York, USA.

== Publications ==
- Translated: League of Nations — The Settlement of the Assyrians, a Work of Humanity and Appeasement - Written in 1935 in Geneva. Question #5.
- Wrote various articles that have been published by: Hujada, Forkono, Azzaman, Al-Muttamar, Al-Iraqi Newspaper, The Assyrian Progressive, etc.
