= Douglas Ryley =

Douglas William Robert Ryley
- Born: 11 November 1905
- Died: 29 December 1985 (aged 80)
- Military career
- Allegiance: United Kingdom
- Branch: Royal Air Force
- Service years: 1924–1962
- Rank: Air Vice Marshal
- Commands: RAF Technical College (1949–52)
- Conflicts: Second World War
- Awards: Companion of the Order of the Bath; Commander of the Order of the British Empire

Air Vice Marshal Douglas William Robert Ryley, CB, CBE (11 November 1905 – 29 December 1985) was a senior Royal Air Force officer.

== Biography ==
Born on 11 November 1905, Douglas Ryley was educated at Bedford School and at the Royal Air Force College Cranwell. He was commissioned in the Royal Air Force in 1925 and served in the Second World War. He was Senior Technical Staff Officer, No. 3 Group RAF from 1948 10 1949, Air Officer Commanding and Commandant, RAF Henlow, from 1949 to 1952, Senior Technical Staff Officer, RAF Coastal Command from 1952 to 1954, Director of Armament Engineering at the Air Ministry from 1954 to 1957, Director of Guided Weapons Engineering at the Air Ministry from 1957 to 1958, and Air Officer-in-charge of Administration, RAF Maintenance Command from 1958 ro 1962.

Ryley retired from the Royal Air Force in 1962. He died on 29 December 1985.
