= Hans Weiss (cyclist) =

German cyclist

Personal information
- Born: 8 October 1910
- Died: 17 December 1985 (aged 75)

Cycling career
- Sport: Cycling
- Discipline: Road
- Role: Rider

Hans Weiss (8 October 1910 – 17 December 1985) was a German racing cyclist. He rode in the 1936 Tour de France.
