= Meteoric water =

Water from precipitation

Meteoric water is the water derived from precipitation (snow and rain). This includes water from lakes, rivers, and glaciers, which all originate from precipitation indirectly. While the bulk of rainwater or meltwater from snow and ice reaches the sea through surface flow, a considerable portion of meteoric water gradually infiltrates into the ground. This infiltrating water continues its downward journey to the zone of saturation to become a part of the groundwater in aquifers.

== Non-meteoric waters ==
Non-meteoric forms of water are connate water and magmatic water (also termed juvenile water). Connate water refers to water trapped between layers of sedimentary deposits during the formation of rock strata. Because rock containing connate water is typically formed from ocean sediments, connate water is normally saline. Magmatic water is water dissolved in magma and rises from great depth accompanying magma intrusions or volcanic eruptions and affects the formation of minerals. Most groundwater is meteoric water, and these other forms normally do not play a significant role in the hydrologic cycle.

== Terminology ==
The term "meteoric" does not refer to meteors or meteorites but instead refers to having a direct atmospheric origin (and is from the same root as meteorology). The term is from a Greek word which originally referred to astronomical discussions. However, after the publication of Aristotle's book Meteorology, which discussed what we today call earth sciences, the term was eventually used to describe any notable changes appearing in the sky (including meteors, originally thought to be weather phenomena).

== See also ==
- Global meteoric water line
- Optimum water content for tillage
