= Kashyap Bandhu =

Indian politician

Pandit Kashyap Bandhu

Kashyap Bandhu (March 1899 – 18 December 1985, born Tara Chand) was a Kashmiri political leader and social reformer.

== Early political life ==
Bandhu was a Kashmiri Pandit. At some point in his early adult life, he left his job and went to Lahore, Punjab. He came under the influence of Arya Samaj and joined the Vrjanand Ashram.

== Social reforms ==
In 1931, Bandhu returned to Kashmir. After returning to Kashmir, he along with Prem Nath Bazaz, Shiv Narain Fotedar and Jia Lal Kilam organised a "Yuvak Sabha".
