= Howard Taylor (cricketer) =

English cricketer

Personal information
- Full name: Howard Taylor
- Born: 5 April 1908; Charlton, Metropolitan Borough of Greenwich
- Died: 30 December 1985 (aged 77); Tunbridge Wells, Kent
- Batting: Right-handed
- Bowling: Right-arm medium

Domestic team information
- Years: Team
- 1937: Kent

Career statistics
Competition	First-class
Matches	3
Runs scored	53
Batting average	8.83
100s/50s	0/0
Top score	29
Balls bowled	216
Wickets	2
Bowling average	60.50
5 wickets in innings	0
10 wickets in match	0
Best bowling	1/34
Catches/stumpings	0/–
- Source: CricInfo, 2 February 2012

Howard Taylor (5 April 1908 – 30 December 1985) was an English cricketer who made three first-class cricket appearances for Kent County Cricket Club in 1937.

Taylor was born at Charlton in the London Borough of Greenwich in 1908 and educated at Mill Hill School. He captained the school cricket XI and played for 'The Rest' against the major Public Schools at Lord's in 1925 and for the Public Schools against the touring Australians in 1926. He was considered one of the best schoolboy cricketers in his age group.

Taylor made his first-class debut for Kent against Yorkshire in June 1937, making a pair on debut but taking the wicket of Herbert Sutcliffe. He made another two first-class appearances for the county later in the month. He played cricket during the Second World War for the Civil Defence, and a final appearance for a minor Kent team in July 1945.

In club cricket Taylor played for Blackheath Cricket Club in the Kent League, as captain in the years after the Second World War. By profession he was a stockbroker and lived in Henley-upon-Thames. He died at Tunbridge Wells in Kent in December 1985 aged 77.

== Bibliography ==
- Carlaw, Derek (2020). Kent County Cricketers, A to Z: Part Two (1919–1939) (PDF). Cardiff: ACS.
