= Ishaya Shamasha Dawid Bet-Zia =

Assyrian author

Ishaya Shamasha David Bet-Zia (also known as Ishaya Shamasha Dawid) (1906 – December 20, 1985) was an Assyrian author, writer, and poet. He wrote a number of books as well as for various Assyrian publications. His most prominent work was a 900-page tome entitled Tasheeta d-Betnahrayn Ashur-Bavel.

== Biography ==
Ishaya Shamasha Dawid Bet-Zia was born in 1906 in the village of Rahimabad to Shamasha Dawid, a deacon in the Chaldean Catholic Church, and Khinneh, both of whom were from the nearby village of Gavilan. While his entire immediate and extended family was massacred in the Assyrian genocide, he and his mother managed to survive after they hid in a barn. After eventually fleeing to the Russian Empire and then Hamadan, he and his mother moved to Baghdad. During his time in Iraq, he became inspired to become a writer after having visited Assyrian ruins on a trip to Nineveh in 1929. He wrote for Ator magazine, among others. He lived in Iraq for over twenty years until he eventually migrated to Tehran, where he published his writing.

== Selected works ==
- Tasheeta d-Betnahrayn Ashur-Bavel (Tehran, 1963)
- Nissan Kadisha (Tehran, 1965)
- Why Disunity (unpublished, 1956)
- Tasheeta d-Betnahrayn Ashur-Bavel, Volume II (unpublished, 1963)
- History of Murassa (unpublished, 1968)
- History of Azu-Marun (unpublished, 1969)
- Leaves of the Vine (unpublished, 1968)
- Marganita Rejected (unpublished, 1968)
- The Trust and Betrayal of a Nation (unpublished, 1983)
- Self-Teacher (unpublished, 1983)
