= Hatsu Ando =

Japanese politician (1912–1985)

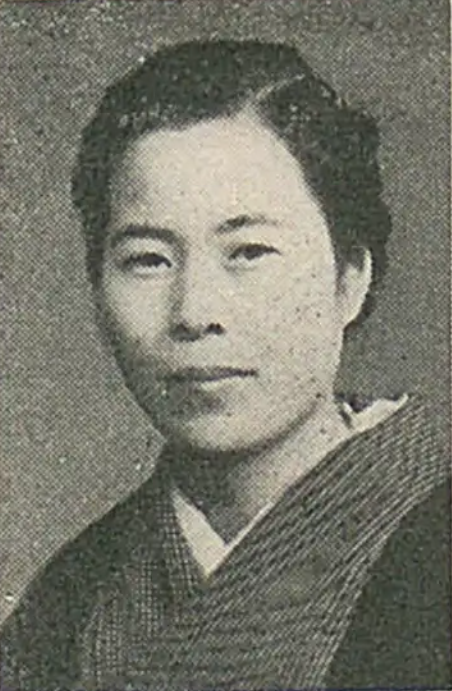
- Ando in 1947

Member of the House of Representatives
- In office 10 April 1946 – 31 March 1947
- Preceded by: Constituency established
- Succeeded by: Multi-member district
- Constituency: Nagano at-large

Personal details
- Born: Hatsu Sen; 20 January 1912 Nirayama, Shizuoka, Japan
- Died: 4 December 1985 (aged 73) Tokyo, Japan
- Party: National Cooperative
- Spouse: Hideo Ando

Hatsu Ando (Japanese: 安藤はつ, 20 January 1912 – 4 December 1985) was a Japanese politician. She was one of the first group of women elected to the House of Representatives in 1946.

== Biography ==
Hatsu Sen was born in Nirayama in 1912. She graduated from a teacher training college in Shizuoka Prefecture and taught at a national school in Omimura until marrying Hideo Ando. She became a member of the New Japan Cultural Association and served as president of the Shin-Etsu Industrial Company. The couple moved to Nagano Prefecture during World War II.

After the war Ando ran a home-based dressmaking business. She contested the Nagano constituency in the 1946 general elections as a candidate of the Peace Party, and was elected to the House of Representatives. After being elected, she joined the National Cooperative Party. She lost her seat in the 1947 elections.

Ando subsequently lived in the suburbs of Tokyo until her death in 1985.
