= José Armando Caro =

Argentine politician (1910–1985)

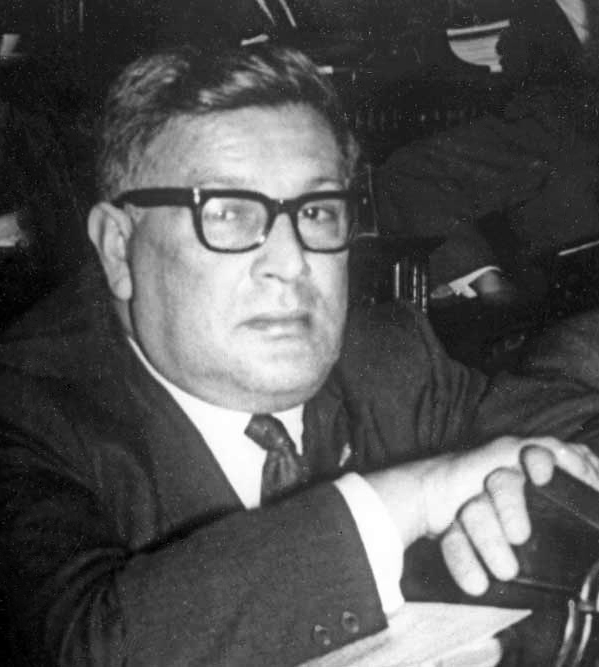
Jose Armando Caro in 1992.

Dr. J. Armando Caro (September 29, 1910 – December 29, 1985) was an Argentine politician, statesman and ham radio born in Cerrillos, a small town in the northern province of Salta.

He studied law in the Argentine universities of Córdoba and La Plata where he obtained his law degree. During his university time he became an active student leader and was elected as president of the Centro de Estudiantes de Derecho and, later, as president of the Federación Universitaria de La Plata. He also represented his fellows as member of the board of the Federación Universitaria Argentina.

In 1943 he worked as advisor to several trade unions in Salta and later (1945) served as a chief of the Salta Police, advisor to national Railroad Company (1946), professor of law in Colegio Nacional "Dr. Manuel Antonio de Castro" and in Escuela Nacional de Comercio "Doctor Hipólito Yrigoyen" (1952–55).

He was appointed Minister of Government of the Province of Salta (1949) when governor Baudilio Emilio Espelta was in office.

Dr. J. Armando Caro had a long run as legislator in his native province. He was elected senator to the Senate of Salta Province in 1948, and later become member of the Constituent Assambly elected to establish the new Constitution of Salta in 1949. He was the spokesman of the redaction committee in this Assambly. He served also as a member of Salta's Chambers of Deputies (1950-1954) and became its president (1951-1952).

His career as a national representative begin in 1955 when he was elected by direct voting for the Argentine Senate. Soon after this, president Perón appointed him as Interventor Federal in the northern province of Santiago del Estero. He was in office until September 16, 1955, when the so-called Revolución Libertadora (a military uprising that ended the second presidential term of Perón) took the power.

In 1962 he was elected as senator for Metán but he declined to be a member of the Argentine Chamber of Deputies. He was re-elected in 1963 and served as a national deputy until June 8, 1966. During this period Dr. Caro became a member of the Latin American Parliament.

In 1973 he was elected for the Argentine Senate again, where he was the head of the Telecommunications and Transport Committee until March 24, 1976.

== Radio and television pioneer ==
Dr. J. Armando Caro began his radio experiences as early as September 1923. He and a group of friend tried to build a small radio receiver to get the transmission of boxing match between Jack Dempsey and Luis Ángel Firpo.

He soon became an amateur radio operator under his metical call sign LU1OA. He was active in creating ham radio clubs and organizations. He was also a founding member of the Radio Club Salta (1950), Secretary of the first convention of FARA (Federación Argentina de Radioaficionados), President of the Federal Council of FARA, member of the Radio Club Argentino and its Center of 'Radioveteranos'. He was technical director (ad honorem) of LV9 Radio Province of Salta (1948-1951), and he installed several radio stations, even to the old national telecom agency Correos y Telecomunicaciones, to connect Salta to the rest of the world. He was an active member of a group that established in Salta the first cable television broadcasting station in Argentina (1963).
