= Oliver Twist (play) =

1905 play by J. Comyns Carr

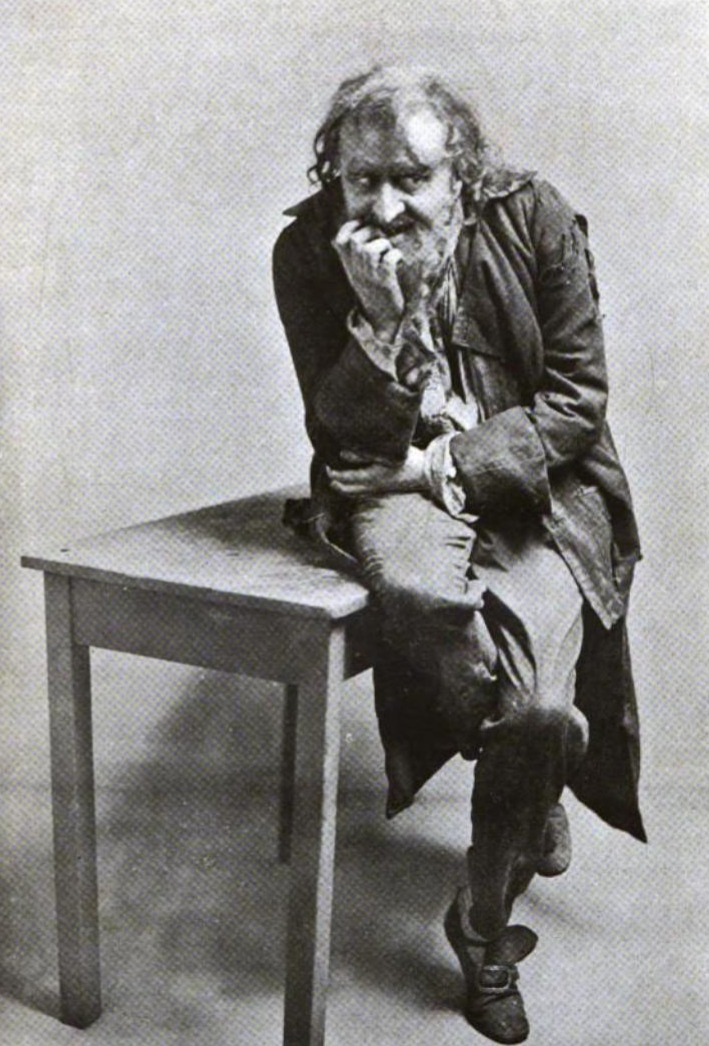
- Herbert Beerbohm Tree as Fagin 1905
- Original language: English
- Written by: J. Comyns Carr
- Based on: Oliver Twist by Charles Dickens
- Subject: An orphan's progress
- Genre: Melodrama
- Setting: London, 1830s

Premiere
- Date: September 4, 1905 (UK); November 13, 1905 (US)
- Place: His Majesty's Theatre (UK); Fifth Avenue Theatre (US)
- Directed by: Herbert Beerbohm Tree

Oliver Twist is a 1905 dramatic adaptation by J. Comyns Carr from part of the 1838 novel by Charles Dickens. The five-act play with ten scenes was commissioned by Herbert Beerbohm Tree who wished to play Fagin, so the playwright built the work around that character.

The play was first tried out in London's West End, for a single performance in July 1905. It had a more formal premiere in September. The production starred Tree, with Constance Collier and Lyn Harding in support. It ran through mid-December 1905.

The London Oliver Twist was still going when F. F. Proctor produced the J. Comyns Carr version in New York, starring J. E. Dodson, with Amelia Bingham, and Hardee Kirkland. It made its Broadway premiere in November 1905 and closed after three weeks.

The J. Comyns Carr version of Oliver Twist had a more successful Broadway revival in February 1912, which starred Nat C. Goodwin, with Constance Collier, Lyn Harding, and Marie Doro, and ran through to May 1912.

== Characters ==
Characters are ordered as shown in the most complete cast list available for the West End productions.

- Fagin
- Bill Sikes
- Artful Dodger
- Charley Bates
- Tom Chitling
- Barney
- Mr Brownlow
- Mr. Grimwig
- Monks
- Harry Maylie
- Dr. Sime
- Mr. Bumble
- Giles
- Brittles
- Jailor
- Warder
- Oliver Twist
- Nancy
- Betsy
- Mrs. Maylie
- Rose Maylie
- Mrs. Bedwin
- Mrs. Bumble
- Maid

== Synopsis of scenes ==
This synopsis was compiled from contemporaneous newspaper accounts.

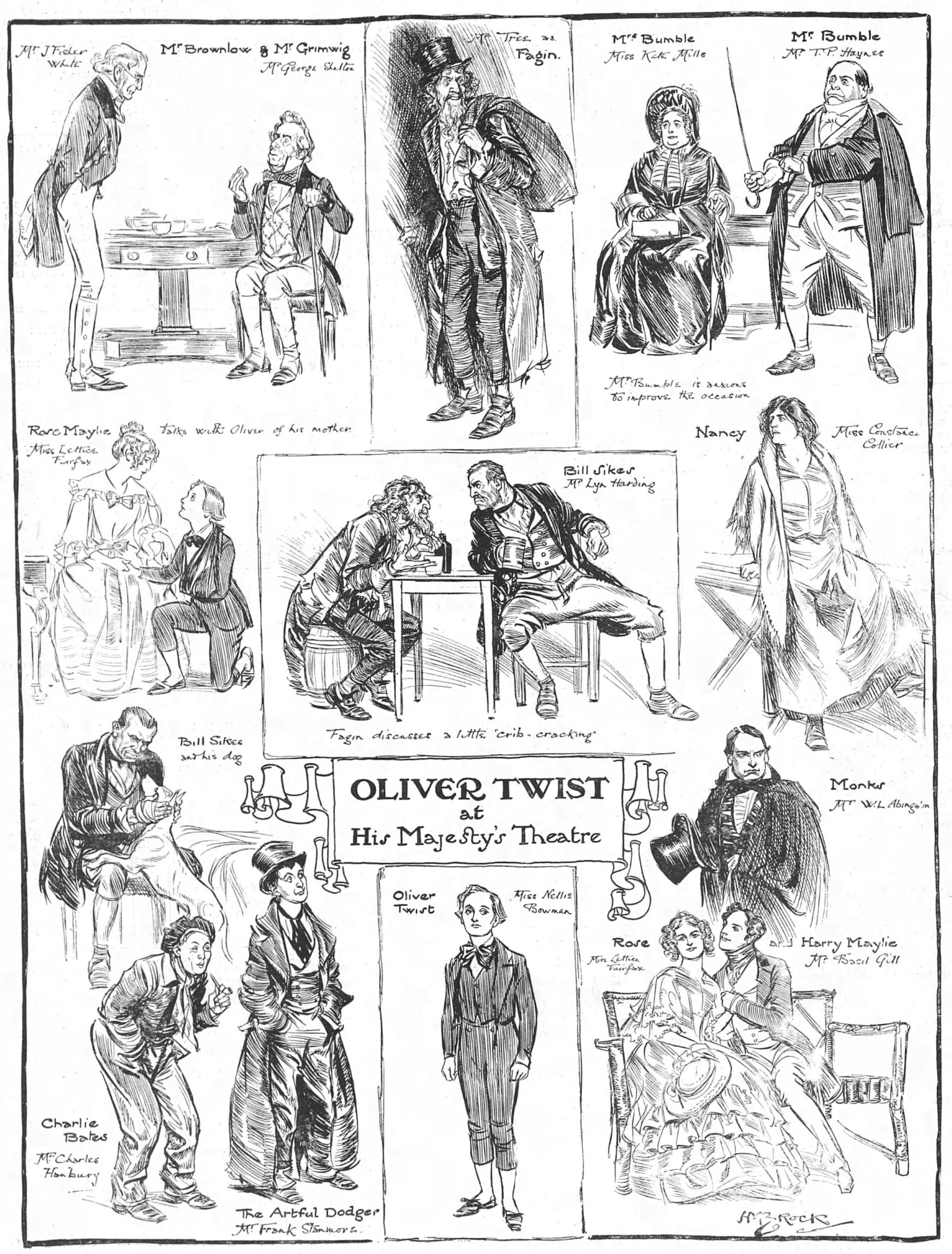
Sketches by H. M. Brock

Act I Scene 1: (Mr. Brownlow's House.) Oliver is introduced, some of his background described through Mr. Brownlow's speaking to a portrait of the dead Agnes Fleming. Scene 2: (Fagin's Den.) Fagin has caused Oliver to be forcibly press ganged into his school for thieves. Oliver becomes acquainted with Charley Bates and the Artful Dodger.

Act II (The Hall of Chertsey.) Bill Sykes forces Oliver to help him rob Chertsey Hall. He breaks an opening into the hall and pushes Oliver through, (Note: The playwright's necessary conceit, as the adult actresses playing Oliver, though petite, would be unlikely to fit through a transom window.) but Giles and Brittles are alerted to the noise as Oliver opens the door for Bill Sikes. In the resulting confusion Bill shoots Oliver in the arm (Note: Another innovation by the playwright.) and leaves him behind. Accused of villainy, Oliver is succored by Rose and Harry.

Act III Scene 1: (Fagin's Den.) Fagin is worried about losing Oliver; he convinces Bill that the boy must be silenced. Nancy overhears them plotting. Scene 2: (Hotel near Hyde Park.) Nancy meets with Rose Maylie, warning her of danger to Oliver.

Act IV Scene 1: (London Bridge.) Nancy and Rose meet with Mr. Brownlow to warn him of the danger to Oliver, but are overheard by Fagin. Scene 2: (Bill Sikes' Room.) Fagin tells Bill of Nancy's treachery. Bill drags her into another room (off-stage); her screams and his blows are heard as he beats her to death, while Fagin stands in the doorway holding a candle. As she grows silent, Fagin blows out the candle.

Act V Scene 1: (The Lawn at Chertsey.) Bill Sikes is killed trying to flee, his pursers alerted by his distinctive bull hound. Fagin is captured. Scene 2: (Fagin's Cell.) Fagin has been condemned and imprisoned. He goes to pieces as his jailor and warder prepare him to face execution.

Final Tableau (Added after tryout): (The Lawn at Chertsey.) Oliver and Mr. Grimwig are shown eating strawberries, while other characters are glimpsed in background.

== Original production ==
=== Background ===
The history of stage adaptations from Oliver Twist begins even before the story was completed by Charles Dickens. Charles Zachary Barnett wrote a three-act burletta of Oliver Twist, produced at the Royal Pavilion Theatre starting May 21, 1838, while it was still being serialized in Bentley's Miscellany. Richard Bentley published a three-volume edition of Oliver Twist on November 7, 1838, and twelve days later an adaptation was launched at the Royal Surrey Theatre. In his work on Dickens and the theater, Alexander Woollcott relates how in November 1838, Dickens and John Forster sought advice from William Macready on dramatizing the story, only to be told it was impossible. That same night, Woollcott continues, they saw Oliver Twist at the Surrey Theatre, an adaptation so painful to the author that according to Forster he lay down on the floor of the stage box until the final curtain.

Since those early stage versions there had been little improvement in adaptations of Oliver Twist for the English stage, as the story was considered too difficult for dramatization. Herbert Beerbohm Tree, however, had a penchant for playing outré characters, as with Svengali in Trilby (1895) and most extraordinarily, Caliban in The Tempest (1904). He commissioned J. Comyns Carr to write a stage treatment of Oliver Twist that put Fagin at the center of attention. Carr accomplished this by truncating most of Oliver's backstory, so that characters such as the Bumbles and Monks were only glimpsed in passing. Fagin, Nancy, and Bill Sikes became the primary focus, with Oliver himself in a supporting role.

=== Cast ===
Cast during the original West End run. The production was on hiatus from July 11 through September 4, 1905.
Role	Actor	Dates	Notes and sources
Fagin	Herbert Beerbohm Tree	Jul 10, 1905 - Dec 16, 1905	
Bill Sikes	Lyn Harding	Jul 10, 1905 - Dec 16, 1905	
Artful Dodger	Frank Stanmore	Jul 10, 1905 - Dec 16, 1905	
Charley Bates	Charles Hanbury	Jul 10, 1905 - Dec 16, 1905	
Tom Chitling	Reginald Owen	Jul 10, 1905 - Dec 16, 1905	
Barney	George Trollope	Jul 10, 1905 - Dec 16, 1905	
Mr. Brownlow	J. Fisher White	Jul 10, 1905 - Dec 16, 1905	
Mr. Grimwig	George Shelton	Jul 10, 1905 - Dec 16, 1905	
Monks	W. L. Abingdon	Jul 10, 1905 - Dec 16, 1905	
Harry Maylie	Basil Gill	Jul 10, 1905 - Dec 16, 1905	
Dr. Sime	Francis Chamier	Jul 10, 1905 - Dec 16, 1905	
Mr. Bumble	T. P. Haynes	Jul 10, 1905 - Dec 16, 1905	
Giles	S. Yates-Southgate	Jul 10, 1905 - Dec 16, 1905	
Brittles	A. E. Benedict	Jul 10, 1905 - Jul 10, 1905	
Brittles	Mr. Smithson	Sep 05, 1905 - Dec 16, 1905	
Jailor	Basil H. Watt	Jul 10, 1905 - Dec 16, 1905	
Warder	Alfred Gray	Jul 10, 1905 - Dec 16, 1905	
Oliver Twist	Hilda Trevelyan	Jul 10, 1905 - Jul 10, 1905	Trevelyan did the premiere night between performances of Alice-Sit-by-the-Fire by J. M. Barrie.
Oliver Twist	Nellie Bowman	Sep 05, 1905 - Dec 16, 1905	
Nancy	Constance Collier	Jul 10, 1905 - Dec 16, 1905	
Betsy	Maude Leslie	Jul 10, 1905 - Dec 16, 1905	
Mrs. Maylie	Adela Measor	Jul 10, 1905 - Jul 10, 1905	
Mrs. Maylie	Alma Murray	Sep 05, 1905 - Dec 16, 1905	
Rose Maylie	Sybil Carlisle	Jul 10, 1905 - Jul 10, 1905	
Rose Maylie	Lettice Fairfax	Sep 05, 1905 - Dec 16, 1905	
Mrs. Bedwin	Mrs. E. H. Brooke	Jul 10, 1905 - Jul 10, 1905	
Mrs. Bedwin	Jennie Lee	Sep 05, 1905 - Dec 16, 1905	Lee was famous for the title trouser role in Jo, a melodrama adapted from Bleak House.
Mrs. Bumble	Kate Mills	Jul 10, 1905 - Dec 16, 1905	
Maid	Muriel Alston	Jul 10, 1905 - Dec 16, 1905	

=== West End tryout ===
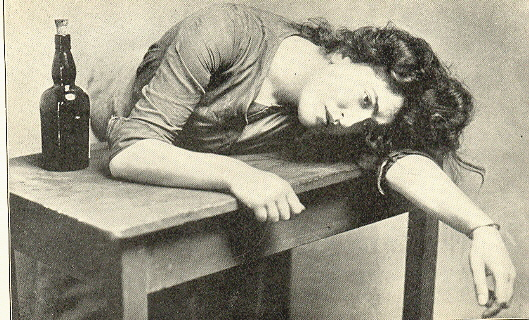
Constance Collier as Nancy

The J. Comyns Carr version of Oliver Twist was first presented on July 10, 1905, for a single night's performance at His Majesty's Theatre, London. This marked the end of Herbert Beerbohm Tree's summer season. One reviewer said the acting honors were held by Tree as Fagin, Lyn Harding as Bill Sikes, and Constance Collier as Nancy, with the audience, among whom were Joseph Chamberlain and his wife, enjoying the melodrama over the "Victorian sentimentality". The critic for The Evening Standard said "It was Fagin, Fagin everywhere last night. Dickens was turned inside out that the play might revolve around Fagin and all his works. Oliver was merely a side show". They also mentioned that Oliver's backstory was heard "before the curtain went up", but did not clarify how this was delivered.

The Times reviewer called it "composite entertainment", "scenes of grim-grotesque alternating with scenes of namby-pamby sentiment". They judiciously ascribed any faults in the story to J. Comyns Carr, having no desire to "excite the choler of the Dickens Fellowship". They admitted to bewilderment, as "Mysterious people-- or rather thumbnail sketches of people-- popped in and out", interwoven with complications to Oliver's story. They remarked of Tree's Fagin: "Give him a monster to play and he is always happy", while sympathizing with Hilda Trevelyan: "It is not her fault that the boy has to talk as no boy, we hope and believe, ever did". Their greatest admiration was for the portrayal of Bill Sikes by Lyn Harding.

=== West End premiere ===
Nellie Bowman as Oliver

Oliver Twist was premiered at His Majesty's Theatre on September 4, 1905, with more elaborate settings. There were some cast changes from the tryout, the most significant being Nellie Bowman as Oliver and Lettice Fairfax as Rose Maylie. Also new was a tableau added after the final scene, a silent display showing Oliver and Mr. Grimwig eating strawberries on the lawn at Chertsey, with a few other characters in the background. One reviewer speculated this was to relieve the final scene tension of Fagin's frenzy in his condemned cell. They summed up the adaptation by saying: "The play is, of course, melodrama, somewhat sordid and decidedly brutal in its most effective passages, but redeemed by the genuinely artistic skill of its treatment alike on the part of its adaptor and of all its leading interpreters on the stage".

=== Change of venue ===
The production was forced to move from His Majesty's Theatre after the Monday evening performance on September 25, 1905, due to the discovery of a crack in the proscenium arch. This was caused by subsidence in the seven-year-old building, and would take weeks to remedy. The stage crew was able to transfer the entire production in one day to the newly built Waldorf Theatre, which the Shuberts had made available. (Note: The Shuberts postponed their own production of Lights Out by Franz Adam Beyerlein, starring H. B. Irving and Eva Moore, until after the His Majesty's Theatre was repaired.) Tuesday evening, September 26, 1905, Oliver Twist was performed at the Waldorf, in what The Evening Standard called "a second 'first night'". Despite the shift, the play continued to attract an audience, including one party with the Princess of Wales, Prince Francis of Teck, and the Earl and Countess de Grey. On Thursday, October 12, 1905, the production of Oliver Twist resumed at the repaired His Majesty's Theatre.

=== Provincial performances and touring ===
By October 16, 1905, Herbert Beerbohm Tree launched a second company, for the first performance of Carr's Oliver Twist outside of London, at the Shakespeare Theatre in Liverpool. This featured William Mackintosh as Fagin, Gertrude Lang as Oliver, with Webb Darleigh as Bill Sikes and Hutin Britton as Nancy. A week later, J. Bannister Howard's company began touring in greater London area theatres with the Carr Oliver Twist, by permission of Howard Beerbohm Tree.

=== Closing ===
Herbert Beerbohm Tree began playing works other than Oliver Twist at matinees starting in November 1905. On December 16, 1905, the last two regular performances of Oliver Twist were played at His Majesty's Theatre, which went dark for the holidays, resuming performances on Boxing Day with a revival of The Tempest, in which Tree played Caliban and his daughter Viola Tree, Ariel.

== Broadway premiere and reception ==
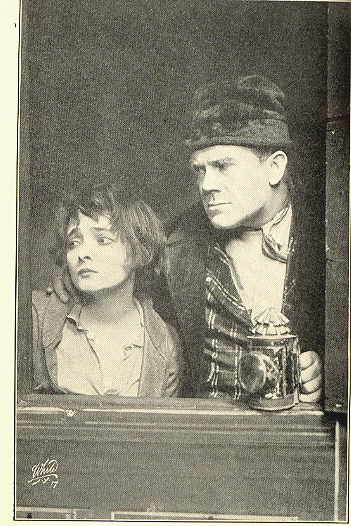
Marie Doro and Lyn Harding

F. F. Proctor bought the North American rights to the J. Comyns Carr version of Oliver Twist, and produced it on Broadway at the Fifth Avenue Theatre, starting November 13, 1905. It starred J. E. Dodson as Fagin, with Amelia Bingham as Nancy, Hardee Kirkland as Bill Sikes, and Agnes Scott as Oliver. The critic for The Sun said "Miss Bingham was an adequate Nancy Sykes, even though her Whitechapel dialect was pure Chicagoese", while Hardee Kirkland gave an excellent performance but "smacked of the Bowery now and then". The New York Times reviewer mentioned that the scene with Bill Sikes beating Nancy offstage was marred by blows that sounded like pillows being struck, causing some laughter in the gallery. With mixed reviews by critics and lacking star power, this production folded on December 2, 1905, after only 24 performances. The North American production rights were then taken up by the management of the Castle Square Theatre in Boston, with John Craig playing Fagin. (Note: This production lasted two weeks, and featured Marion Ballou as Oliver, with Lillian Kemble as Nancy, and Mary Young as Rose Maylie.)

== 1912 Broadway revival ==
The J. Comyns Carr version of Oliver Twist was revived on the centenary of Dickens' birth at the New Amsterdam Theatre on February 26, 1912. It was produced by George C. Tyler of Liebler & Company, restaged by Hugh Ford, aided by Frederick Stanhope, the latter also serving as stage manager.

Nat C. Goodwin starred as Fagin, (Note: The play was revived, according to George C. Tyler, solely because Nat Goodwin sent him begging letters asking for "something to do at any salary that would keep him out of playing one-night stands in the South."), while Constance Collier and Lyn Harding reprised their West End roles of Nancy and Bill Sikes. Marie Doro played Oliver Twist, and Olive Wyndham did Rose Maylie. After a successful month, the production moved over to the Empire Theatre, where it ran to May 4, 1912.

== Bibliography ==
- Dudley Cran. Herbert Beerbohm Tree. John Lane Publishers, 1907.
- Alexander Woollcott. Mr. Dickens Goes to the Play. G. P. Putnam's Sons, 1922.
- George C. Tyler and J. C. Furnas. Whatever Goes Up. Bobbs Merrill, 1934.
