= Dancing Mothers (play) =

1924 play by Edgar Selwyn and Edmund Goulding

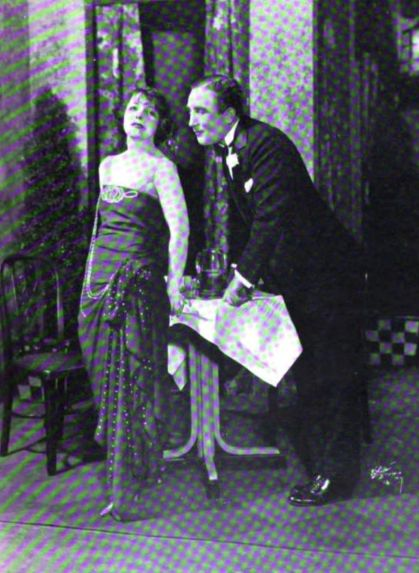
- Mary Young and John Halliday
- Original language: English
- Written by: Edgar Selwyn and Edmund Goulding
- Subject: A family unravelling
- Genre: Satire
- Setting: A home in Westbury, New York, a rooftop nightclub, and a bachelor apartment.

Premiere
- Date: August 11, 1924
- Place: Booth Theatre
- Directed by: Edgar Selwyn

Dancing Mothers is a 1924 play by Edgar Selwyn and Edmund Goulding. It is a four-act satire, with three settings, and a large cast. The action of the play takes place over three weeks time. The story concerns a forty-year-old woman whose philandering husband and wild daughter take her for granted, prompting her to break loose herself. The plot was considered conventional up to the ending, which was surprising for putting individual happiness over familial obligations.

The play was produced and staged by Edgar Selwyn, with sets designed by Clifford Pember. It starred Mary Young, Helen Hayes, John Halliday, and Henry Stephenson. It had two tryouts in the spring of 1924, then premiered in Manhattan during August of that year. It ran the entire season on Broadway, ending in May 1925 after over 300 performances. Critic Burns Mantle included Dancing Mothers in his compendium of the Best Plays for 1924.

Dancing Mothers was adapted for a 1926 silent film of the same name.

== Characters ==
Characters are listed in order of appearance within their scope.

Lead

- Ethel Westcourt, called Buddy, is 40; she gave up her acting career for marriage 20 years ago.
- Catherine Westcourt, called Kittens, is Ethel's 19-year-old flapper daughter.
- Hugh Westcourt is Ethel's slightly older husband, who both inherited wealth and has earned more.
- Gerald Naughton called Jerry, is a local sheik, who bewitches women but so far hasn't lost his heart to one.

Supporting

- Kenneth Cobb is 20, a priggish neighborhood wannabe boyfriend to Kittens.
- Mrs. Zola Massarene is a divorced older friend of Ethel, who tries to be daring but is too timid to really cut loose.
- Irma Raymond is an adventuress who has been having affairs with both Hugh and Jerry.

Featured

- Andrew is the Westcourt's butler.
- Clarence Houston is an unattached male friend of Mrs. Massarene, and much the same sort.
- McGuire
- Blondy
- Charley is a waiter at the rooftop garden.
- Mrs. Barnes is a gossiping socialite.
- Davis is Jerry's valet.

Bit Players

- Marie
- Mr. Williams
- First Young Man
- First Young Woman
- Second Young Man
- Second Young Woman
- Escort
- Second Waiter

== Synopsis ==
The play was colored by the then recent passage of the Volstead Act, which made public sale and consumption of alcohol illegal. This synopsis was compiled from contemporaneous newspaper accounts and from excerpts published in The Best Plays of 1924.

Act I (The Westcourt home in Westbury, New York. A late summer afternoon.) Kenneth Cobb upbraids Kittens Westcourt for her drinking, smoking, and chasing after Jerry Naughton. He threatens to inform her mother if she doesn't mend her ways. She dismisses him for a prude. Mrs. Massarene calls on Ethel Westcourt, to persuade her to come out to a rooftop garden nightclub that evening. When Ethel demurs to be with her family, she is given hints that her husband and daughter are both up to no good. Having heard from Kenneth, Ethel tries to confront Kittens but is dismissed with a lot of sass. She then pleads with her husband Hugh Westcourt to counsel Kittens, for he's the only one to whom she listens. Hugh speaks with Kittens, but is thwarted by a full charm offensive. Hugh then dismays Ethel by saying he will be staying overnight at his club in the city. (Curtain)

Act II (Roof garden dancing venue. That evening.) Mrs. Massarene and her escort Clarence Houston are surprised to see Ethel show up to the rooftop garden after all. Jerry is pointed out to her, sitting with Irma Raymond, who is also well-known to her husband Hugh. When Jerry comes to their table, Ethel affects a French accent and claims to be from Paris. Jerry isn't really fooled, but plays along anyway, though he doesn't know she is Kittens' mother. Hugh comes to take Irma into the dancing area, but doesn't see Ethel, who begs off dancing with Jerry to avoid him. Meanwhile, Jerry is becoming entranced with Ethel in her liberated persona. However, Hugh does finally spot Ethel, and tries to order her home. She won't leave, and further informs him she will stay with Mrs. Massarene in the city while Hugh and Kittens go off to White Springs, Florida for a vacation. (Curtain)

Act III (Gerald Naughton's bachelor apartment. Early evening, two weeks later.) Kittens shows up at Jerry's apartment in the city after returning from a two-week vacation. Jerry is out, but his man Davis unwisely permits her entry, and acquiesces to her demand for cocktails. She grows woozy with liquid solace waiting for Jerry's return, and Davis is forced to pick her up and deposit her on the bed in the guest room. When Jerry comes in, he is confronted with a visit from Irma. He informs her their affair is over, he has fallen for someone else. Ethel comes by after Irma leaves and is wooed by Jerry. But Kittens has recovered somewhat, and a confrontation between mother and daughter over their joint paramour ensues. Jerry is amused rather than alarmed by the revelation Ethel is the mother of Kittens. He sends the latter home, making plain his choice. (Curtain)

Act IV (Same as Act I. An afternoon, a week later.) Hugh and Kittens are at home, discussing Ethel's continued absence. Kittens is again seeing Kenneth Cobb. Mrs. Massarene is brought in by Andrew. She has come with Ethel, who is waiting out in the car to see if Hugh will receive her. She has come, not for reconciliation, but to get personal items for her upcoming trip to Europe. She explains to Hugh and Kittens how their own conduct drove her to esteem happiness over family. She rejects their offers to reform, saying it would be only temporary, and just lead to her being sidelined again. Jerry has followed Ethel to the house; he defends himself well against Hugh's accusations, by counterattacking. Do not blame "scoundrels" for bringing happiness to wives betrayed by their husbands, he retorts. It is clear Jerry plans to follow Ethel to Paris. After they leave, Kittens and Hugh look at each other in astonishment: "She's gone!" they say. (Curtain)

== Original production ==
=== Background ===
The earliest public mention of Dancing Mothers came in February 1924, with word that co-authors Edgar Selwyn and Edmund Goulding had finished writing it. A month later, Selwyn returned from vacation to begin preparing the play for production. Later in March it was reported that Selwyn had hired Mary Young to play the female lead, and at the end of the month had also secured John Craig and John Halliday.

Rehearsals began April 2, 1924; by this time Frances Howard had also been signed. A first tryout was announced for April 29, 1924 in Washington, D.C.

=== Cast ===
Cast from the tryouts through the Broadway run. Production was on hiatus from May 11 through August 7, 1924.
Role	Actor	Dates	Notes and sources
Ethel Westcourt	Mary Young	Apr 29, 1924 - May 9, 1925	Young was continuing to play in Fashion up to a week before the Dancing Mothers tryout.
Kittens Westcourt	Frances Howard	Apr 29, 1924 - May 10, 1924	Howard left during the hiatus for another flapper role in The Best People.
Kittens Westcourt	Helen Hayes	Aug 08, 1924 - Nov 01, 1925	Selwyn signed Hayes after she saw the Atlantic City tryout.
Kittens Westcourt	Dorothy Burgess	Nov 03, 1924 - May 9, 1925	Burgess was promoted from understudy when Hayes left to begin rehearsals for Quarantine.
Hugh Westcourt	John Craig	Apr 29, 1924 - May 10, 1924	Craig was Mary Young's husband.
Hugh Westcourt	Henry Stephenson	Aug 08, 1924 - May 9, 1925	
Gerald Naughton	John Halliday	Apr 29, 1924 - May 9, 1925	
Mrs. Massarene	Eleanor Woodruff	Apr 29, 1924 - May 10, 1924	Woodruff took on another Broadway role in The Locked Door during the hiatus.
Mrs. Massarene	Norma Mitchell	Aug 08, 1924 - May 9, 1925	
Irma Raymond	Elsie Lawson	Apr 29, 1924 - Feb 21, 1925	Lawson was borrowed for the tryouts from Spring Cleaning.
Irma Raymond	Riza Royce	Feb 23, 1925 - Apr 04, 1925	Royce took over when Lawson went on holiday before joining the London production of Dancing Mothers.
Irma Raymond	Anita Booth	Apr 06, 1925 - May 9, 1925	
Kenneth Cobb	Michael Dawn	Apr 29, 1924 - May 9, 1925	
Andrew	Lewis Waller	Apr 29, 1924 - May 9, 1925	
Clarence Houston	Timothy Thomas	Apr 29, 1924 - May 9, 1925	
McGuire	Adin Wilson	Apr 29, 1924 - May 9, 1925	
Blondy	Joan Cochran	Apr 29, 1924 - May 9, 1925	
Charley	Rodolpho Badaloni	Apr 29, 1924 - May 9, 1925	
Mrs. Barnes	Grace Burgess	Apr 29, 1924 - May 9, 1925	Burgess, sister of Fay Bainter, persuaded Edgar Selwyn to give her daughter Dorothy Burgess a bit part in September 1924.
Davis	Arthur Metcalfe	Apr 29, 1924 - May 9, 1925	

=== Tryouts ===
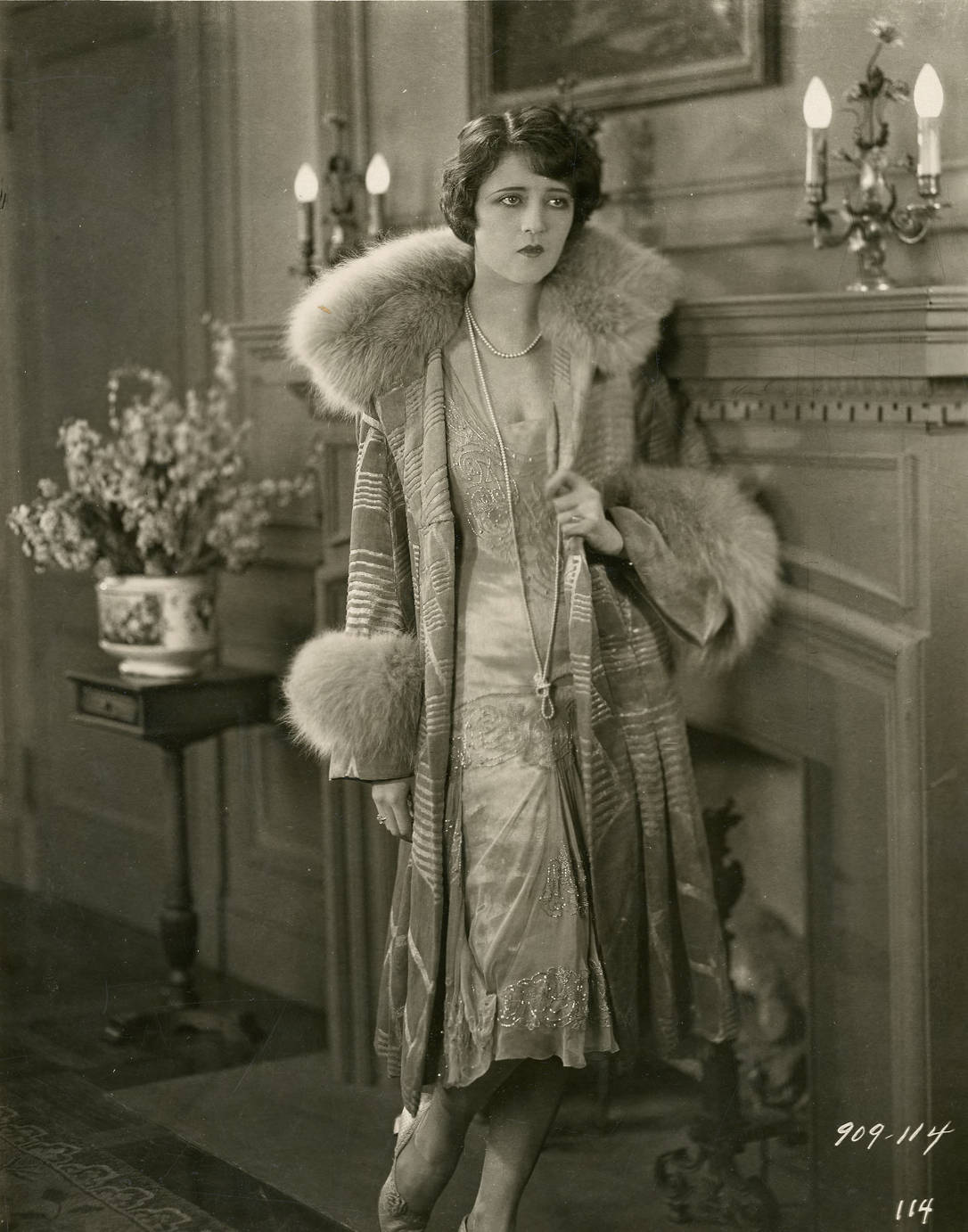
Elsie Lawson 1926

The first performance of Dancing Mothers came at the Shubert Belasco Theatre in Washington, D.C., on April 29, 1924. The reviewer for The Evening Star said of it: "Sharp satire, bites deeply and deliciously", and thought Frances Howard as the cocktail drinking flapper daughter was worth the ticket price alone. They also praised the way Mary Young handled the lead role, and saluted the work of John Halliday, John Craig, and Elsie Lawson.

After one week at the Belasco, the production moved to Nixon's Apollo Theatre in Atlantic City, New Jersey, starting May 5, 1924. This was another week-long engagement, that ended on May 10, 1924. Local reviewer Horace Blitz said that although the story develops conventionally, interest is maintained through the play's construction, comic bits, and the quality of the acting. His praise was mostly for Mary Young and John Halliday, but also included Frances Howard, John Craig, Elsie Lawson, and Eleanor Woodruff in the accolades.

Normally, successful tryouts would be followed by a Broadway opening, but many producers in the spring of 1924 had cleared their production schedule in anticipation of a looming labor issue. Edgar Selwyn was a member of the Producing Managers Association, whose contract with Actors' Equity Association would expire on June 1, 1924. Though reconciled to the prospect of Equity enforcing a closed shop on the producers, Selwyn decided to postpone launching Dancing Mothers until the next season.

Following a summer break, the company reassembled on July 21, 1924 to start rehearsals. Edgar Selwyn had recast three principal roles, two for actresses who had taken other work. (Note: Frances Howard and Eleanor Woodruff had signed with other Broadway plays, while John Craig had gone into summer stock in New Hampshire.) A two-night tryout was held at the Lyceum Theatre in New London, Connecticut, starting August 8, 1924. A local reviewer noted that despite "excessive heat a surprisingly large audience" was present and enjoyed the "speed-filled" action and "crisp dialogue". They did suggest cutting down the running time and the "ending must be changed to conform to modern convention".

=== Broadway premiere and reception ===
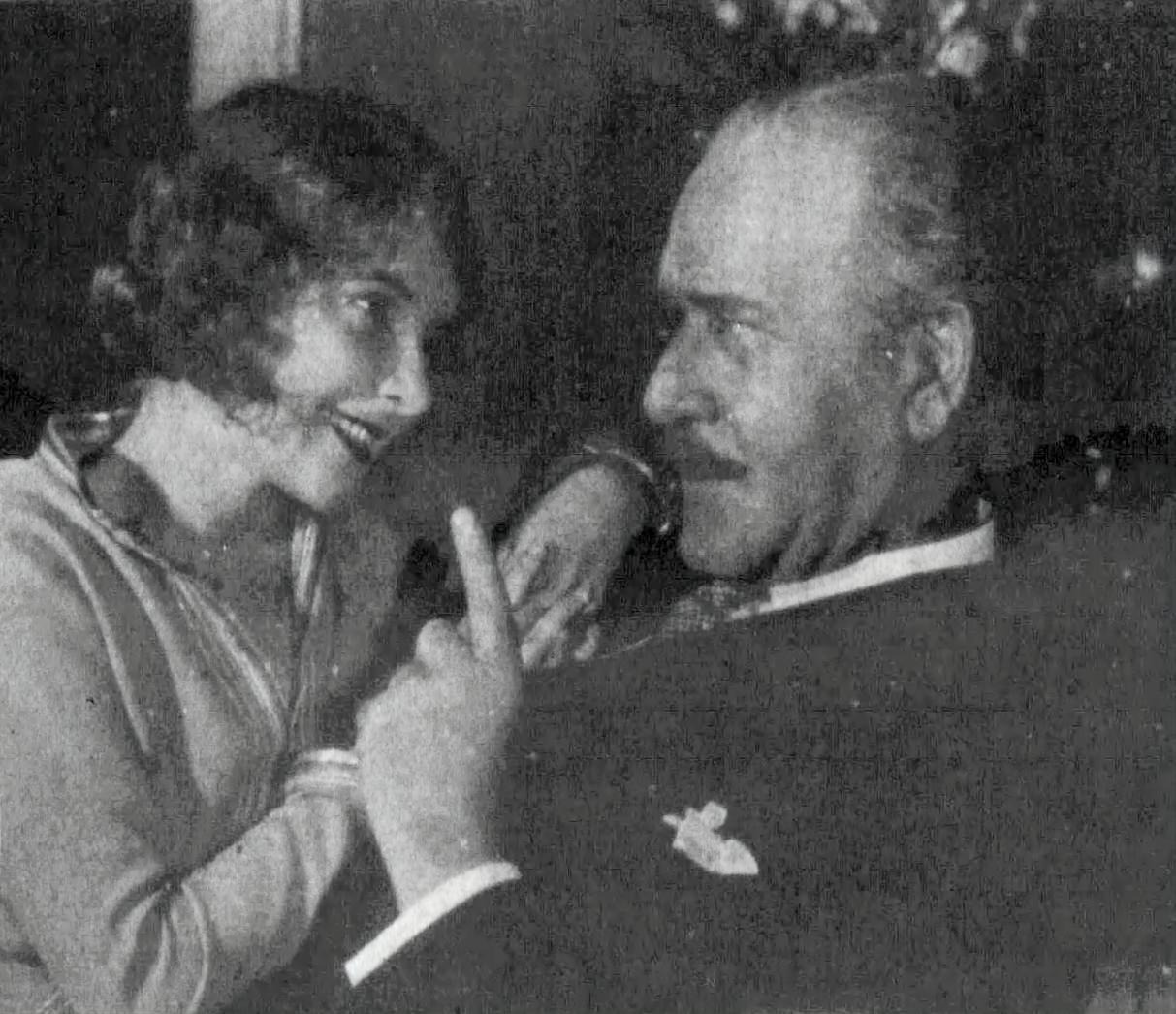
Helen Hayes and Henry Stephenson

Dancing Mothers had its Broadway premiere on August 11, 1924 at the Booth Theatre. It was the first play to open the new season; with no other works to cover, the Daily News sent two different drama critics to review it on separate evenings. Burns Mantle had a positive view of the play's vitality and its "appeal to justice" for the mother, to which the audience responded favorably. He also was pleased the authors allowed the mother to go to Europe with the charming fellow she took away from her daughter. His main concern was with the casting of the daughter and father. Helen Hayes was too young-seeming and Henry Stephenson too old: "He seems 60 and she seems 16" (Note: Stephenson was only 53 but Hayes was actually 23 on opening night.) when they should appear as 40 and 20. His colleague Max Lief, having attended the third night's performance, was less enthused about Dancing Mothers. He considered that as a play it would make "an absorbing six-reeler" film. Obsessed with the Kittens character's wild ways, he called her a "cocktail-lapping flapper" and claimed she "was born with a silver flask in her mouth". He mentioned that the "cute Helen Hayes" (Note: Hayes had already had enough of that adjective from Heywood Broun; in later years she claimed, critics learned not to use it unless they wanted to be sued.) played the role well, and also praised Elsie Lawson for her gold digger performance.

The reviewer for The Brooklyn Citizen recorded the audience's astonishment at the unexpected ending of what till then had seemed a predictable story line. They felt this "raised the play above the happy-ending, reunion ideas" that pervaded American theater. Arthur Pollock gave credit to the playwrights for sincerity of purpose, but said that "an unhappy ending" by itself does not necessarily make for a good play. He said the mother who left her family to be happier was "no Nora, although her exit is from Ibsen". However, The Brooklyn Daily Times critic did call Ethel Westcourt "a modern Norah" [sic], and praised Mary Young for her poise in presenting the character "with a semblance of life".

=== Change of venue and continuing run ===
To make way for a new Edna Ferber and George S. Kaufman play, Minick, Dancing Mothers finished at the Booth Theatre on Saturday, September 20, 1924. Tickets were selling eight weeks in advance when it moved to Maxine Elliott's Theatre on Monday, September 22, 1924. Around the same time, Dorothy Burgess joined her mother Grace Burgess in the cast, for a bit part in the roof garden scene and to serve as understudy to Helen Hayes. The production reached its 100th performance with the Saturday matinee on November 1, 1924, and its 300th with the Monday evening show on April 20, 1925.

=== Broadway closing ===
Dancing Mothers closed at Maxine Elliott's Theatre on May 9, 1925, after 321 performances. (Note: This included the matinee and evening performances for the last day.) Out of 200 plays presented for the 1924-1925 Broadway season, critic Burns Mantle selected Dancing Mothers as one of the ten best, which also included Desire Under the Elms, What Price Glory? and They Knew What They Wanted.

== Adaptations ==
=== Film ===
- Dancing Mothers - 1926 silent film adaptation by Forrest Halsey, directed by Herbert Brenon, and starred Alice Joyce, Conway Tearle, Clara Bow, with Elsie Lawson (as Eleanor Lawson) reprising her role from the play.

== Bibliography ==
- Helen Hayes and Sandford Dody. On Reflection: An Autobiography. M. Evans and Company, 1968.
- Burns Mantle (editor). The Best Plays of 1924-1925. Small, Maynard & Company, Boston, 1925.
