= John Craig (actor) =

American stage actor and director (1866–1932)

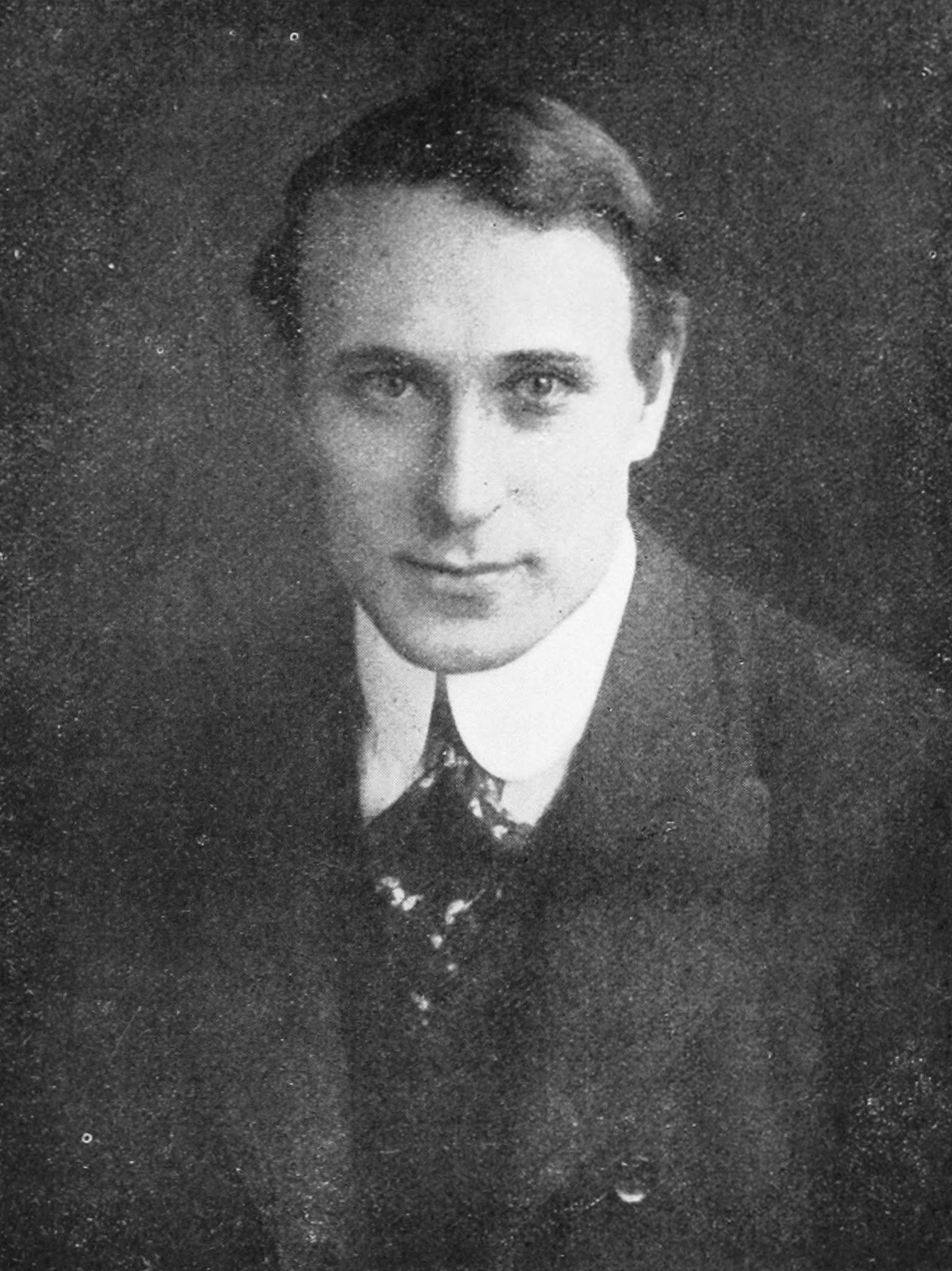
- John Craig 1903
- Born: John Richard Craig; June 1866; Mount Pleasant, Tennessee, U.S.
- Died: August 23, 1932 (age 66); Manhattan, New York, U.S.
- Occupations: Actor, Director, Producer
- Years active: 1888 - 1932
- Known for: Castle Square Theatre
- Spouse: Mary Young (m. 1894; div. 1931)
- Children: 2
- Relatives: Harmon Craig (grandson)

Signature
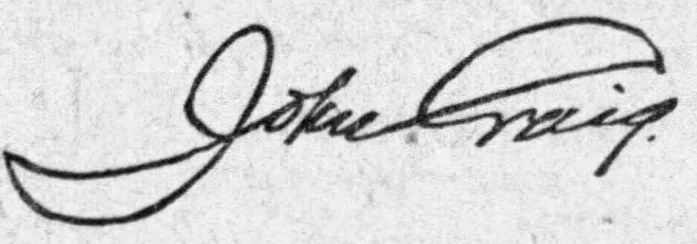

John Craig (June 1866 – August 23, 1932) was an American actor, director, and producer. During his forty-four years on the stage he performed in and directed dozens of Broadway productions. He managed the Castle Square Theatre stock company in Boston for many years, sponsoring an annual prize for the best play written for Professor Baker's drama courses at Harvard University and Radcliffe College. Two of these plays, Believe Me, Xantippe and Common Clay became successes on Broadway after being produced at the Castle Square Theatre. He took many neophyte actors into his company who would later become well-known performers, such as Donald Meek, Mabel Colcord, Peggy Wood, William Powell, and Charles Bickford. Craig also developed new talent, giving Alfred Lunt his first acting job. Shortly before his death he performed onscreen for the first time in an early talkie, Silence.

== Early years ==
John Richard Craig was born during June 1866, (Note: There is an alternate date of January 1868 listed in some online sources, but this earlier date from the 1900 US Census is in accord with the age of 27 he gave on his March 1894 marriage license.) in Mount Pleasant, Tennessee. (Note: Some of his obituaries misidentified his birthplace as "Columbia County, Tennessee", which does not exist and was a mistake for the nearby city of Columbia, Tennessee.) His family moved to Texas when he was young, and he grew up on ranches there. He was a clerk in a Galveston, Texas store when he saw his first play at age 18. He went to New Orleans and tried to join a stock company but found no takers. Around age twenty, with $125 in savings, he left for New York to become an actor. He sustained himself at a variety of jobs until he was taken on as a supernumerary in a stock company.

== Augustin Daly's Company ==
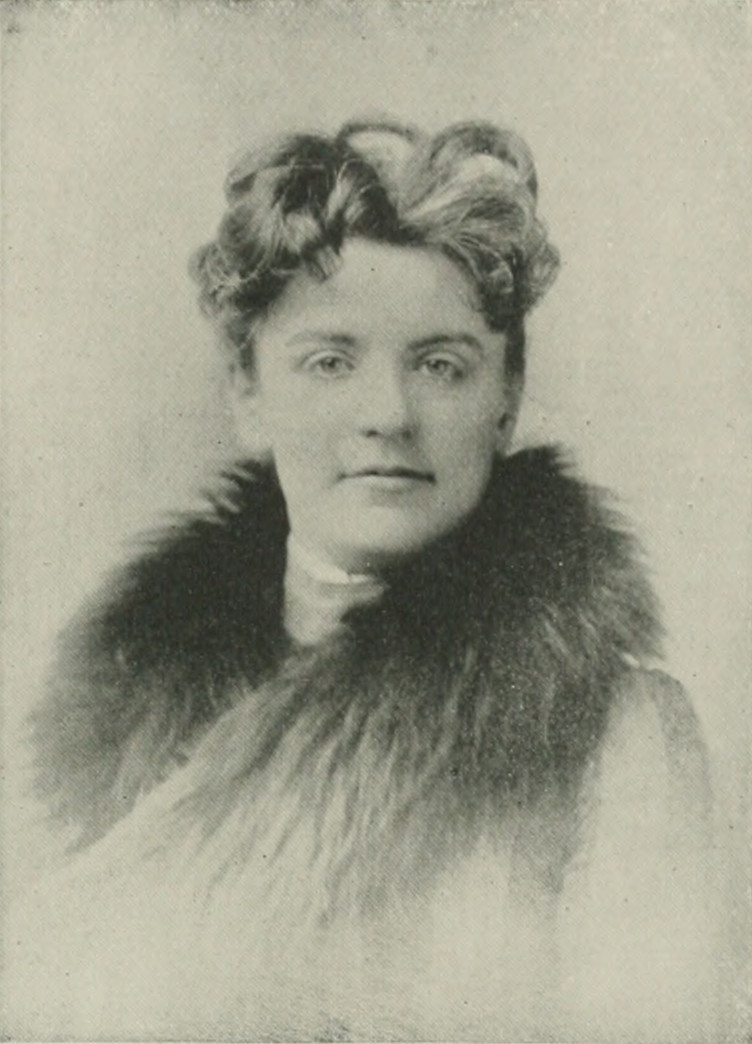
Ada Rehan 1893

Craig's first known credit was with producer Augustin Daly's organization in late 1891. By this time he had spent three years in stock companies. He and Tyrone Power Sr. were new members of Daly's company in The Taming of the Shrew, at Daly's Theatre on November 25, 1891. Ada Rehan, who managed the troupe for Daly, played Katherina Minola, while John Drew portrayed Petruchio. Tyrone Power's Christopher Sly was praised highly by a reviewer, while Craig's Lucentio "was satisfactory". After a month, the company switched to As You Like It, Rehan and Drew taking on Rosalind and Orlando de Boys respectively, while Craig played Oliver de Boys.

The Foresters, in its American and Broadway premiere, was Craig's third play for Daly's Company, starting March 17, 1892. Ada Rehan and John Drew played the leads (Maid Marian and Robin Hood), while Craig had the part of Prince John Lackland. He continued to play supporting roles, such as in The Last Word during May 1892, but had little chance for a lead while John Drew remained with the company.

When The Foresters was performed on tour in Boston, there was a new cast member, credited as May Young, though her birthname was Mary. Primarily a dancer, (Note: Sixty years later she danced with Gene Kelly, as an uncredited flower-seller in the "By Strauss" cafe number of An American in Paris.) she was a twelve-year-old discovery of Augustin Daly. Both Craig and Young accompanied Daly's company as it played Chicago and finished its tour in San Francisco during July 1892. They went to England with the company in June 1893, to open the new Daly's Theatre in London.

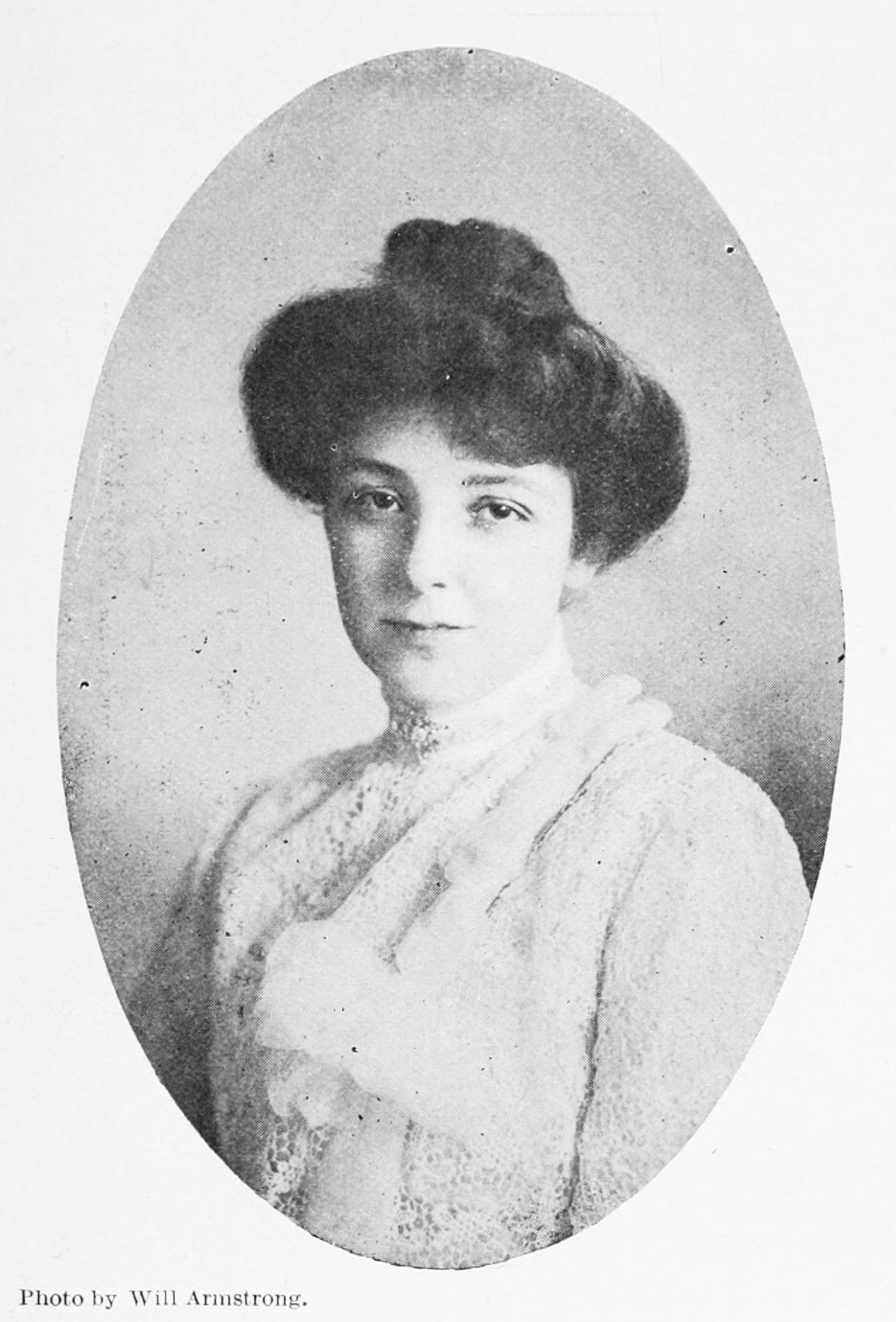
Mary Young 1903

Still in London during January 1894, Craig played Duke Orsino in Twelfth Night opposite Ada Rehan as Viola. This was his first time as her leading man. Craig was said to perform "with polish and dignity", while Ada Rehan was criticized for slowing down her part. The reviewer also expressed surprise at the insertion of an "elaborate Oriental dance"; though uncredited, the dancer was May Young. That Young was there in London is known from when she and Craig secretly married at St Giles in the Fields on March 17, 1894, with her mother and a church warden as witnesses. (Note: Craig listed his age as 27, while May Young, apropos of her birthname, was 14.) The marriage needed to be kept secret for Augustin Daly had a firm rule that husbands and wives could not perform together in his troupe.

The production of Twelfth Night was a marked success, reaching an unprecedented 100th consecutive performance on April 19, 1894, with members of the Royal family in the audience. Craig was saluted by a critic for his excellent elucidation of Shakespeare's words. Daly's Company closed its London engagement in early May 1894 with a week-long revival of As You Like It, Craig playing Orlando to Ada Rehan's Rosalind. The Times reviewer said "A new Orlando of unusual merit appears in John Craig". In a letter from London to the Boston Evening Transcript, correspondent Marie de Mensiaux claimed "Mr. Craig is, without exception, the best Orsino and the best Orlando I have yet seen".

Craig continued as Ada Rehan's leading man at the season opening in Boston during September 1894, but when the company came to New York in December 1894, Craig told Augustin Daly about the marriage. Daly at first replaced Craig in Twelfth Night, but decided he was more valuable, and so dismissed Young. Though unreported by newspapers, the driver behind Craig's admission would become apparent with the birth of Harmon Bushnell Craig six months later. Daly later relented on his policy, allowing May Young to play Titania in A Midsummer Night's Dream alongside her husband as Lysander. The couple's second and last child, John Richard Craig Jr. was born in August 1896. Craig remained with Daly's company until April 1898, when he left for a stock company in Philadelphia. He then spent a year with Mrs. Fiske, before joining the Castle Square Theatre stock company in September 1899.

== Castle Square Theatre ==
The Castle Square Theatre was an 1800-seat venue located in Boston, Massachusetts. Opened on November 12, 1894, it housed a stock theatre company, with comic opera for the summer seasons. The theatre was modern for its time, equipped with an electrical plant, ice-powered cooling system, and an elevator to the balconies. It was well-ventilated, said to be fireproof, with broad aisles and accessways, and possessed perfect acoustics.

=== Leading man ===
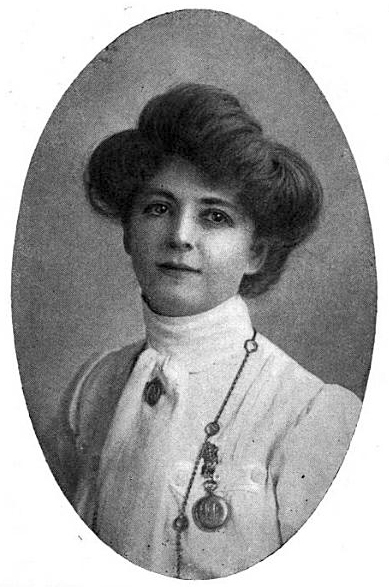
Lillian Lawrence

Craig's first performance at Castle Square Theatre came during September 1899, in The Wife, an 1887 four-act comedy by David Belasco and Henry Churchill de Mille. Craig was the new leading man for the stock company, co-starring with Lillian Lawrence. The following week they starred in Sue, an 1896 comedy by Bret Harte and T. Edgar Pemberton. These two plays, like the others performed during the remainder of 1899, were revivals, standard stock company repertoire. On January 1, 1900, however, the first American production of With Flying Colors was mounted at Castle Square Theatre. This five-act naval melodrama by Seymour Hicks and Fred G. Latham had recently finished its original run in London. The Boston cast included Mary Young (Note: From this point on in her career, she was credited by her birthname rather than "May Young".) making her Castle Square Theatre debut.

The Castle Square Theatre continued presenting plays early July 1900, closing its season with What Happened to Jones, a three-act farce by George Broadhurst, with Craig in the title role. After a summer break, Castle Square Theatre opened its fourth season in September with Divorce, a five-act society drama by Augustin Daly. Craig and Lillian Lawrence were again paired as that season's leads. By April 1901, Craig had convinced the management to produce the first Shakespeare ever presented at Castle Square, in place of the regular melodramas. He played Shylock in The Merchant of Venice, with Lillian Lawrence as Portia. After five seasons as leading lady, Lillian Lawrence left the Castle Square company with A Night Off in May 1901.

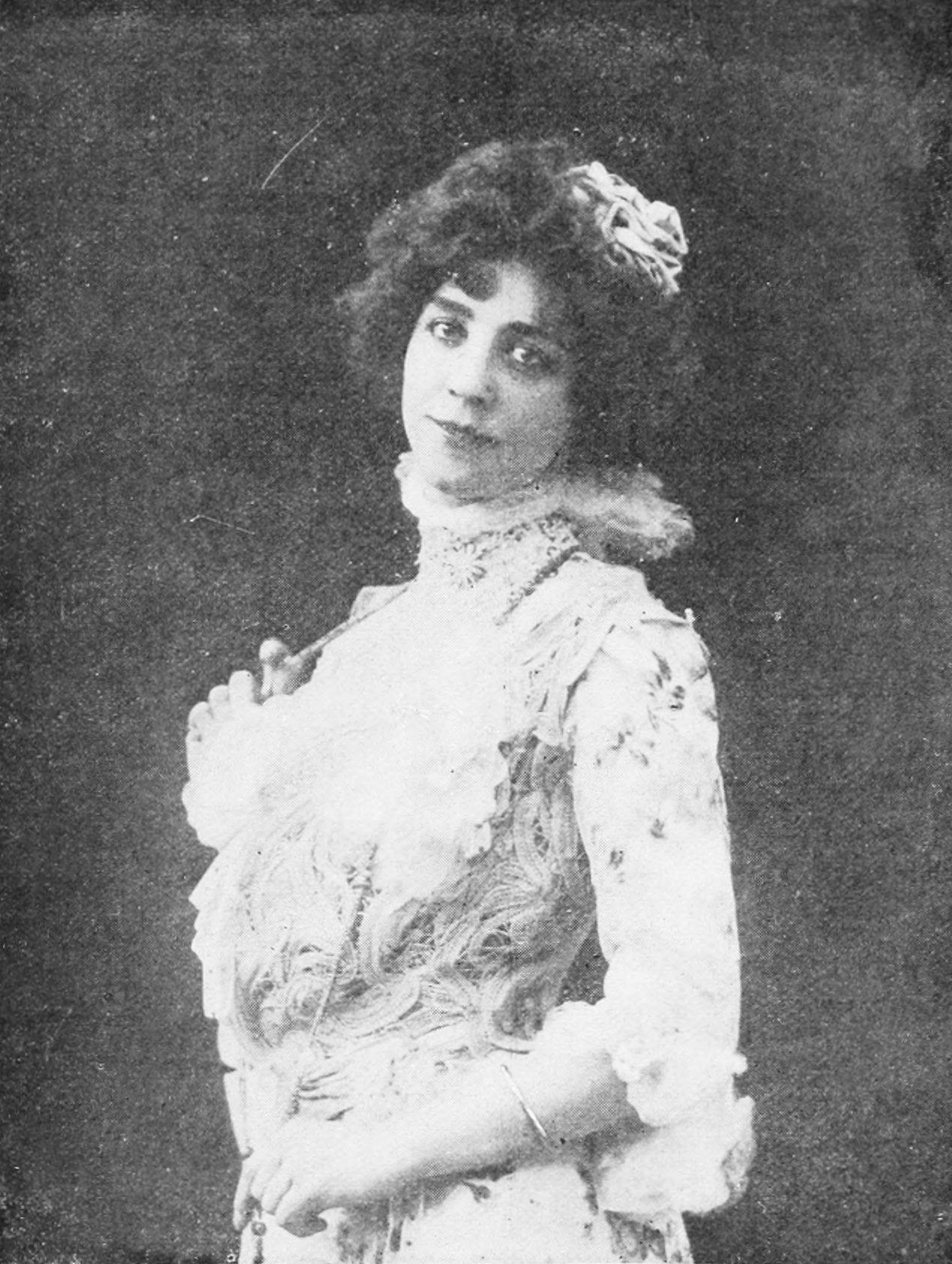
Eva Taylor

Having agreed to stay another season as leading man, Craig went off to Texas to look over "his extensive oil and cattle properties", after which he returned to Winthrop Beach for the 1901 summer break. He joined the new leading lady, Eva Taylor, in presenting The School for Scandal as the opening work for the new season. The Belle of Richmond, the first play by Sidney Toler, had its Boston debut in November 1901, with Craig as a modern-day lawyer who solves a bank embezzlement. As in the previous year, Craig was able to get another Shakespeare play scheduled in April 1902. Hamlet was produced, according to a reviewer, following Edwin Booth's version of the work. Craig played the title role, with Eva Taylor as Ophelia. The Boston Post critic said Craig was "to be commended for a thoroughly intelligent presentation".

=== Bringing Shakespeare to Castle Square ===
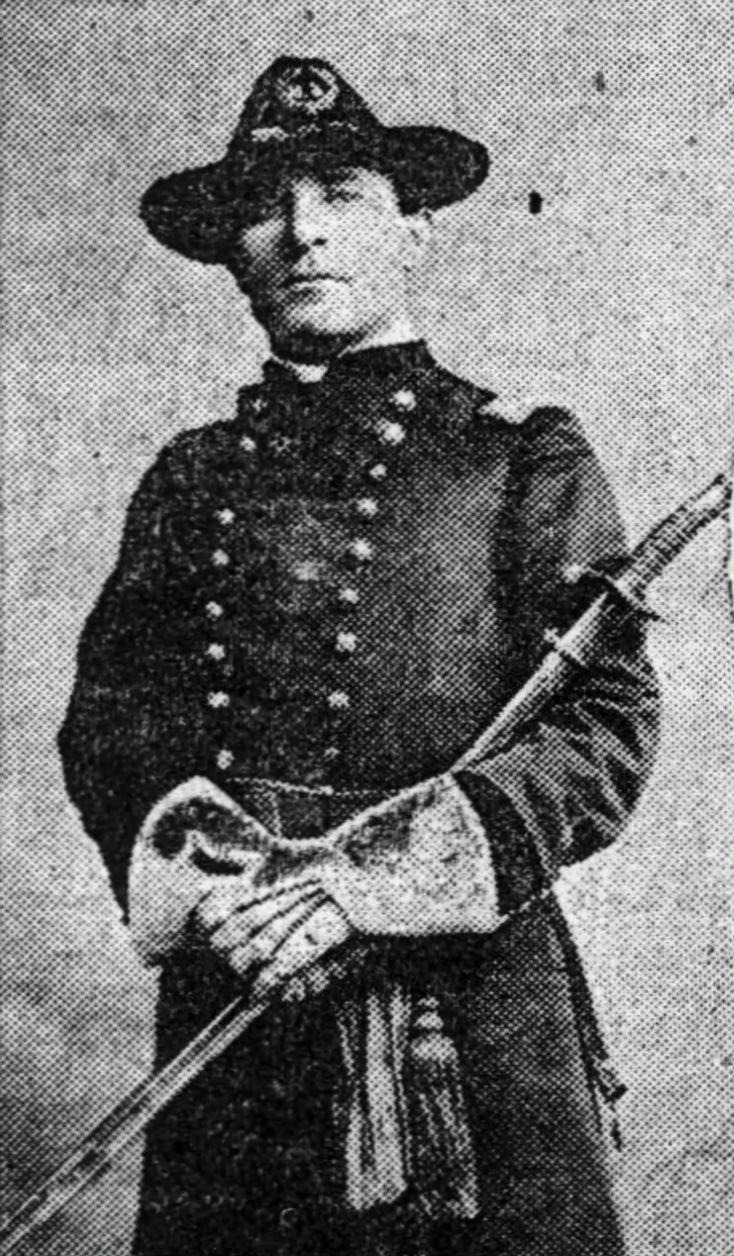
John Craig

At the request of Mrs. Fiske, Craig reprised his role in her revival of Tess of the d'Urbervilles during May 1902. The two-week engagement on Broadway meant yielding his position temporarily with the Castle Square company; Eva Taylor left at the same time. By June 1902, the Boston Post reported Craig had signed to play leading roles at Castle Square for the next season, with Lillian Lawrence returning as leading lady. While sitting out the summer season he took on a one-week engagement for the GAR, playing the lead in The Drummer Boy of Shiloh at their Boston encampment.

The fall and winter season of 1902-1903 was opened with As You Like It, Craig and Lillian Lawrence playing Orlando and Rosalind. This was followed by The Importance of Being Earnest, The Taming of the Shrew, and Richard III. The talent of Craig and Lillian Lawrence, and the recent acquisition of John Sainpolis to the stock company, were driving the production schedule towards more challenging works than the usual melodramas, despite a mishap during a stage sword fight with Sainpolis that took Craig off the boards for a while in January 1903.

Craig played the lead in Othello during February 1903, with John Sainpolis as Iago and Lillian Lawrence as Desdemona. The critic for the Boston Evening Transcript noted the packed audience, as usual when the Castle Square played Shakespeare, but was harsh with the company's weakness at blank verse. Even Craig came in for criticism for interpolating words and not following the metrical rhythm.

In April 1903, Craig started his own company, which began touring when the Castle Square season ended. Mary Young, known in Boston as Craig's wife, returned to the stage after several years absence to play the female lead. (Note: This was a significant advancement for Young, who had started as a specialty dancer and had only played one part (Titania) larger than a featured role.) Craig chose the comedy Prince Karl for the tour, opening at the Bijou Theatre in Boston, starting May 4, 1903. The production was well received, with Craig and Young both praised by reviewers, the latter especially for an original song she performed in the third act, Just a Little Wink, which was encored several times. After a week in Boston, the company toured nearby towns in New England for short runs.

== Vaudeville and San Francisco ==
Craig signed to become leading man for Mary Mannering during the 1903–1904 season in New York. They opened with an original tragedy called Judith, which one reviewer described as "Camille without a 'past'". But by December 1903, Craig was back in Boston, having left the tour with reports his popularity eclipsed the star and the play. He decided to spend time with the Keith vaudeville circuit, performing an excerpt from The Taming of the Shrew with Mary Young at Keith's Theatre. In January 1904, he again played Duke Orsino in Twelfth Night, supporting Viola Allen in her Boston and New York City engagements.

“Mr. Craig is very direct in method, unfalteringly sure of himself and with any amount of vim. He is truly the 'leading' man, dominant, even aggressively so. He possesses a distinctive stage presence and an exceptionally pleasing voice, and one can understand his every word.” — Blanche Partington review in The San Francisco Call

In April 1904 Craig, Mary Young, and Lillian Lawrence joined Frank Losee and William H. Turner in the E. F. Albee stock company at Keith's Theatre in Providence, Rhode Island. They performed together through the summer of 1904, with Lawrence and Craig playing a week-long Boston engagement in September.

Craig and Lawrence then went to San Francisco as the new leads for the Alcazar Theatre stock company. Craig, with Mary Young accompanying him, spent a week visiting Southern California and Catalina Island. While on an excursion boat at the latter, he lost a gold watch overboard, but was able to dive in and retrieve it. Craig and Lawrence opened in Lord and Lady Algy on October 10, 1904, to favorable reviews from Blanche Partington.

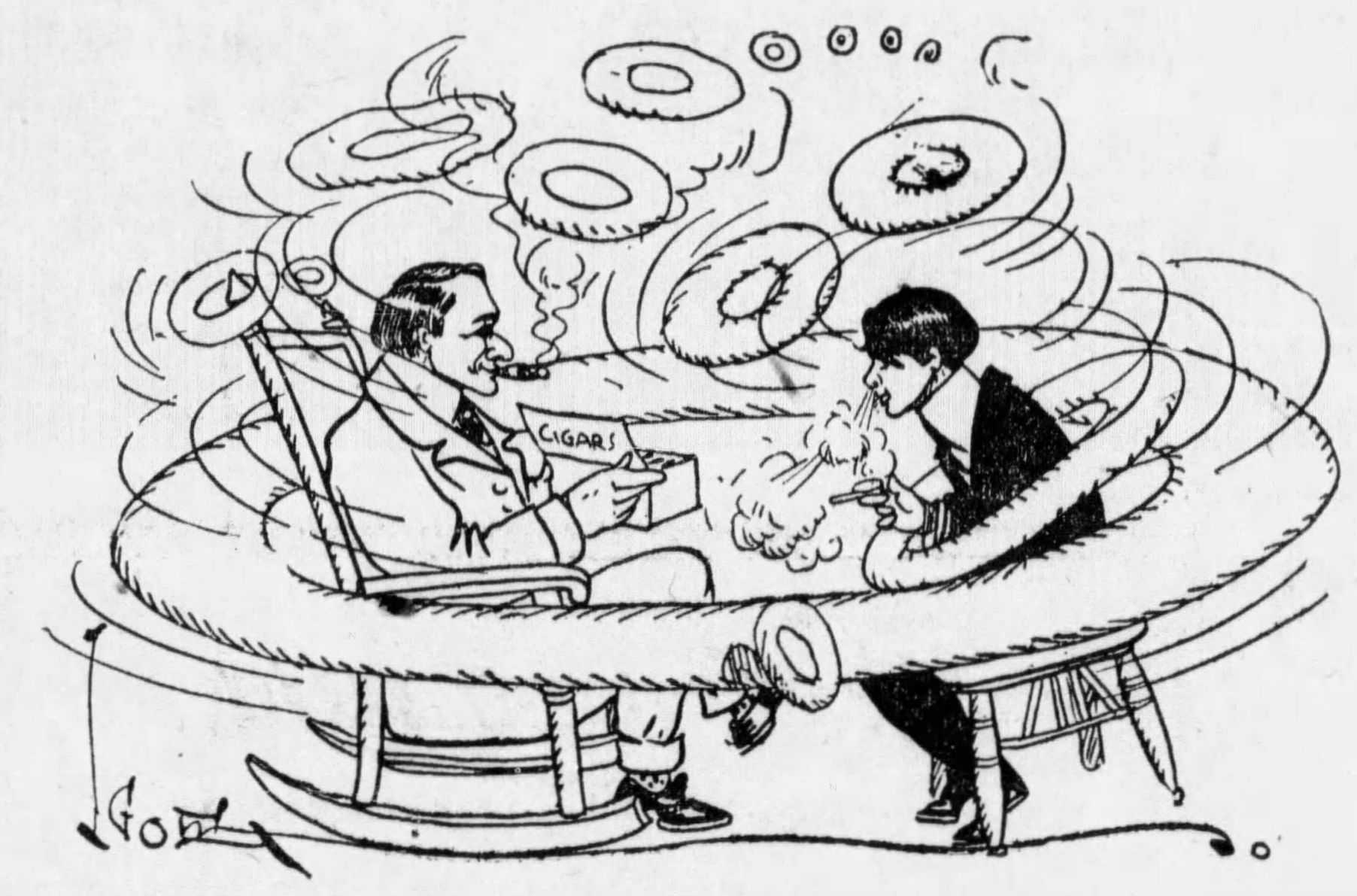
John Craig and Ashton Stevens 1904

Two weeks later, after having seen him in three plays, critic Ashton Stevens wrote an editorial for The San Francisco Examiner proclaiming Craig the best leading man in the eight-year history of the Alcazar Theatre stock company. Four days later, The Examiner published a full page interview of Craig by Ashton Stevens. Stevens described Craig as a big athletic man, a constant cigar smoker, whose inspiration for acting came from seeing William Gillette, and who claimed Mrs. Fiske taught him more about acting than Augustin Daly ever did. Craig mentioned his wife Mary Young was now appearing with the Tivoli Opera House company in town. He showed Stevens a scar on the palm of his right hand, caused by a stage mishap with Maxine Elliott.

Craig continued playing at the Alcazar, bringing Shakespeare to it for the first time in years during February 1905. He and Lillian Lawrence played Shylock and Portia in The Merchant of Venice as in Boston, with Mary Young making her Alcazar debut as Jessica. Craig and Mary Young played husband and wife on stage for the first time in Vivian's Papas by Leo Ditrichstein, during May 1905. However, the next month they resigned from the Alcazar company, following a dispute with management over Mary Young's status. (Note: To keep Craig, the Alcazar management had been forced to sign Young as principal ingenue four months earlier. Their reluctance to use her as agreed stemmed from a belief that audiences did not want to see husband and wife playing together on stage.)

== Return to Boston ==
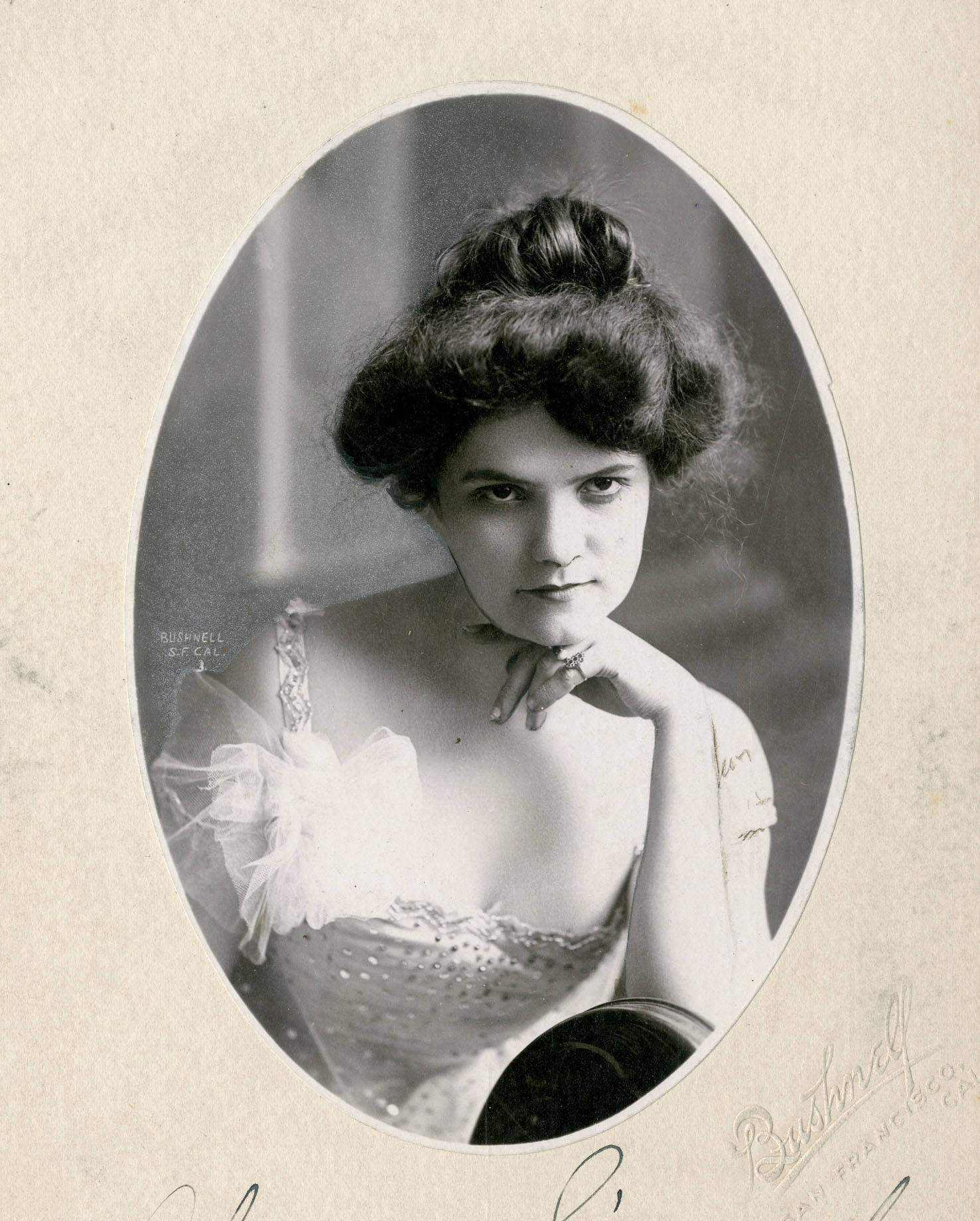
Lillian Kemble

Craig and Young rejoined the Castle Square stock company in September 1905. Craig was again leading man, playing opposite Lillian Kemble. Young, though listed in newspaper advertisements as a member of the company, did not appear in cast lists until the third production of the season. The Boston Stage Society sponsored Much Ado About Nothing in late October 1905, with Craig as Benedick, Lillian Kemble as Beatrice, and Mary Young as Hero. Craig played the seducer Lord Darlington in Lady Windermere's Fan, followed by Young Marlow in She Stoops to Conquer, both during December 1905, and opened January 1906 as Fagin in Oliver Twist. (Note: This was an adaptation of Charles Dickens' novel by J. Comyns Carr for Herbert Beerbohm Tree, the American production for which had just premiered on Broadway two months earlier.) The acting for Julius Caesar in February 1906 was subject to harsh criticism, Craig as Brutus excepted, with Lillian Kemble as Portia and Mary Young in a trouser role as Lucius singled out for censure.

== Actor-Manager ==
In May 1906, Craig took on the lead for the Empire Theatre (Note: This was located at 17 Winter Street, between Washington and Tremont Streets, in Boston.) stock company. Later, in June 1906, he formed his own summer stock company at the Globe Theatre, which included Mary Young. In September 1906 Craig leased the Bijou Theatre and moved his stock company there. As at the Globe, Craig scheduled two a day performances, matinee and evening shows, six days a week, (Note: A normal schedule for an early 20th Century American theatre would have been eight performances weekly: six evening shows and two matinees.) for the Bijou Theatre.

The professional debut of An Enemy of the People in Boston was produced by Craig's company at the Bijou Theatre in February 1907, with Craig as Dr. Thomas Stockman. For this production Mary Young played the daughter Petra, while Mabel Colcord performed as Mrs. Stockman and Verner Clarges as Peter Stockman. The critic for the Boston Evening Transcript said many players groped for their lines, understandable given the pace of the Bijou schedule, but praised the overall vitality of the performances. By April 1907 the John Craig company had returned to the Globe Theatre in Boston for the summer season, playing through July 1907.

Craig signed with E. F. Albee to be leading man for the Harlem Opera House stock company in New York City, starting in September 1907. His leading lady was Beatrice Morgan, the works presented were melodramas and light comedies, and the local drama critics paid little attention beyond listing the titles and stars. Craig kept this up until April 1908, when the Harlem Opera House presented an untitled play written by Beatrice Morgan.

== Castle Square management ==
=== Opening season: The Devil and musicals ===
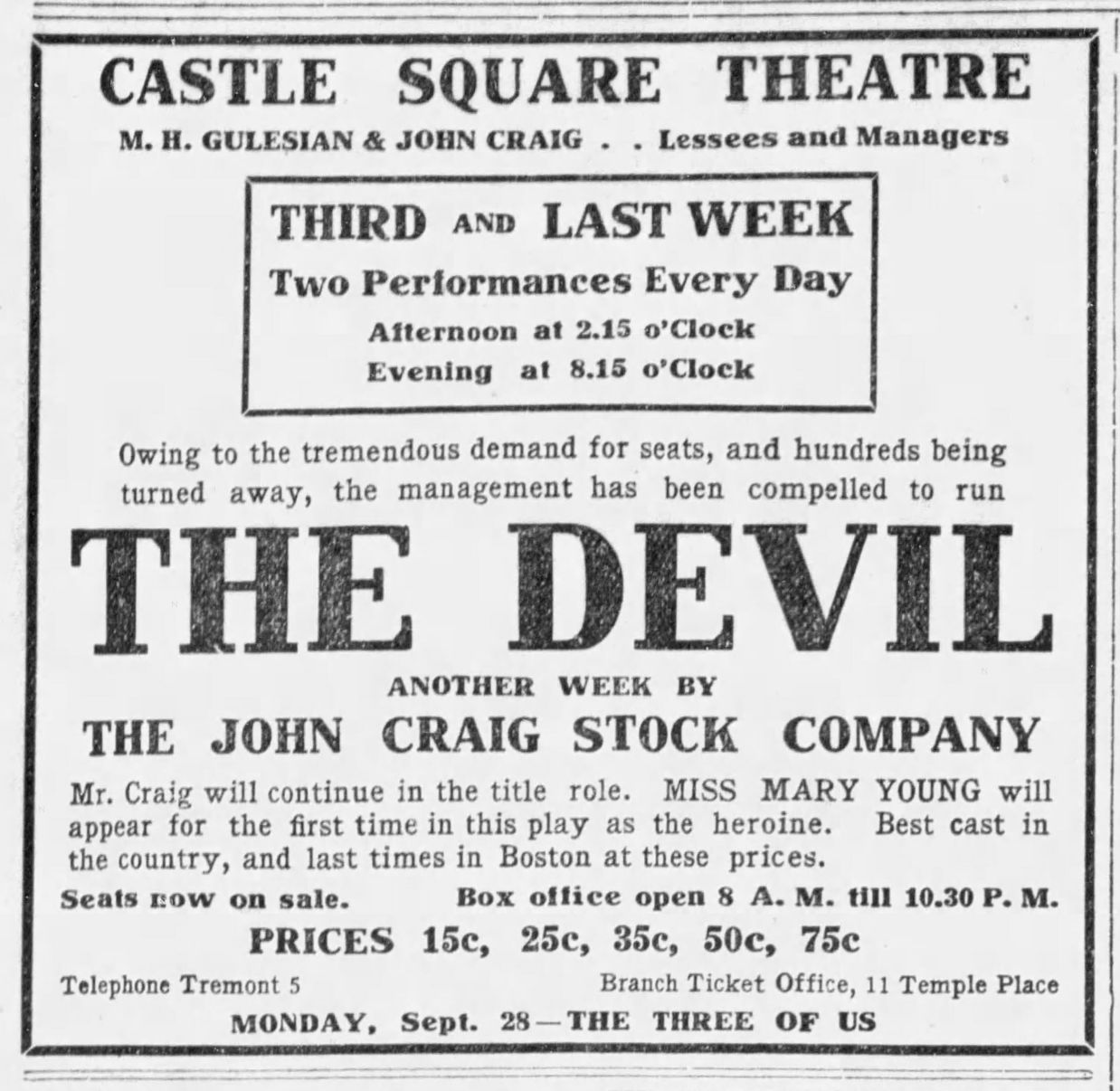

Craig returned to Boston and in May 1908 acquired the lease for the Castle Square Theatre for the fall and winter season of 1908–1909. He and Mary Young would play the leading roles, while associate partner Moses H. Gulesian helped manage the venue. The opening production was a 1906 Broadway hit, The Road to Yesterday by Beulah Marie Dix and Evelyn Greenleaf Sutherland. Managers Craig and Gulesian surprised first-nighters with usherettes and an all-female orchestra led by Josephine Pfau. The cast included Mabel Colcord, Donald Meek, and George Hassell, while the stage manager was William Parke. For the second production of the season, Craig presented The Devil by Ferenc Molnár, which had opened on Broadway a few weeks earlier. (Note: With no copyright agreement between Austria-Hungary and the United States, American producers had no legal impediment to mount alternate English adaptations of the play. Two were being presented on Broadway, one of which starred George Arliss. Craig commissioned a third adaptation from Marie Doran; she worked from the same German text of the play as the Broadway versions.) Lillian Lawrence was signed for two weeks to play the heroine, while Craig took the title role. It proved so popular that Craig held it over for a third week, with Young replacing Lawrence.

The Native-American protagonist of Strongheart was Craig's next challenge. This 1904 play with racism as its central theme had just become available to stock companies. A local critic said Craig "acted with vigor, intelligence and sincerity", but overwork (Note: The John Craig Stock Company was still giving two performances daily, six days a week, with mornings devoted to rehearsing the next week's play.) sapped the energy of Young and the other actors. At the end of October 1908, while the company was performing The Admirable Crichton, Craig and Moses H. Gulesian dissolved their partnership "by mutual consent", Craig assuming sole responsibility for the managerial lease. For Christmas Eve 1908, Craig and his company revived The Devil for the matinee then performed a musical for the first time that evening. The Circus Girl proved so popular, particularly Mary Young as Lucille the slackwire artist, (Note: A bittersweet experience for Mary Young, as her mother Emma Jane Bushnell Young died during the run.) that Craig held it over eight weeks through mid-February 1909, alternating it with a new work in the ninth week.

During the spring of 1909 two of Mary Young's four older brothers, Bert and Wilfred Young, (Note: Their stage names; they were actually Ethelbert and Winfred Young.) were added to the John Craig Stock Company cast. In April, Craig presented a second musical revival, The Runaway Girl, with Mary Young and Donald Meek as the leads. This popular production ran for five weeks, and was followed by another musical, The Geisha. Despite having completed forty weeks of performances, Craig kept his stock company performing into the summer season, he and Mary Young commuting by auto everyday from their summer home in Marblehead, Massachusetts. Craig added two more singers to his company, William P. Carleton and Louise Le Baron, for the fourth musical he presented, Florodora.

=== The first Harvard prizes ===
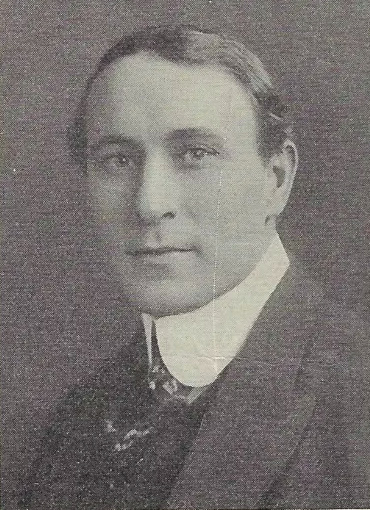
John Craig 1915

The competition for the Harvard Prize, also referred to as the John Craig Prize, was first announced in early 1910. It was to be awarded to the best play of three acts or more, written in conjunction with Professor Baker's English 47 Playwriting Workshop at Harvard University and the courses he taught at Radcliffe. The contest was open to any Harvard or Radcliffe undergraduate or recent graduate. The prize consisted of a $500 award, (Note: Half of the monetary award went to the playwright, the other half to Harvard University library for purchasing books on the theater.) along with the opportunity to have the play produced at the Castle Square Theatre by Craig, with the playwright receiving three per cent of gross profit. The winning play was decided by a committee of three: John Craig, Professor Baker, and Horace B. Stanton of Harvard University.

The first prize was awarded in January 1911 for The End of the Bridge by Florence Lincoln, a drama student at Radcliffe. Her work, a small-cast drama of sacrifice and reconciliation, won over those submitted by sixteen Harvard men and five other women from Radcliffe. The play was first produced on March 6, 1911, with Craig and Mary Young as the leads, for an audience composed overwhelmingly of Radcliffe students and graduates. The play ran for nine weeks, ending on May 6, 1911.

The second Harvard Prize also went to a Radcliffe woman, Elizabeth McFadden, for The Product of the Mill, awarded in October 1911. Her play was a drama concerned with "conditions in a southern cotton manufacturing town". McFadden, from Cincinnati, Ohio, graduated from Smith College in 1898, but did graduate work at Radcliffe the previous two years. Her play was produced for the first time on January 29, 1912. A grim portrayal of child labor in the South that fed profits to a New England-based owner (played by Craig), it ran until the first week of March 1912. It evidently touched a nerve with one Boston drama critic, a "Mr. Tanner", for Elizabeth McFadden penned a vigorous response to his accusations of "inaccuracies and misrepresentations", that was printed by his newspaper.

=== Believe Me, Xantippe ===
For the third annual Harvard Prize, Craig turned to a farce by a Harvard graduate student, John Frederick Ballard, titled Believe Me, Xantippe!. It was an immediate success, running from January thru April 1913, with Craig playing a wealthy New Yorker collared by a female deputy sheriff (Mary Young) in Colorado. William A. Brady and the Shuberts joined Craig in bringing the play to Broadway in August 1913. Craig restaged it, with John Barrymore replacing him as male lead, starring opposite Mary Young.

The selection committee for the Harvard Prize play announced that it would not be awarded for 1913–1914, as none of the plays submitted were of sufficient merit.

=== Alfred Lunt ===
Among the many performers hired by Craig for his stock company, the most successful in future years would be Alfred Lunt. A sometime student at Emerson College in 1912, Lunt saw the Castle Square Theatre was hiring, went in, and applied for a part to John Craig. Lunt was hired by Craig as actor and later assistant stage manager, making his Castle Square acting debut in October 1912 with The Aviator by James Montgomery. Lunt persevered in featured parts, drawing no attention from critics until September 1914, when he attracted favorable notice in Arizona, and again the following month in The Ne'er Do Well.

=== Common Clay ===
The most successful of the Harvard Prize plays was Common Clay by Cleves Kinkead. This story of injustice towards a female servant who becomes pregnant by the heir to a wealthy family was awarded the prize in October 1914. The Castle Square Theatre production starred Alfred Lunt as the young heir, Mary Young as the wronged servant, and Craig as an old judge. It ran from January through May 1915, for over 200 performances. A. H. Woods purchased the play and took it to Broadway in August 1915. It ran through to June 1916 for 330 performances.

=== Final seasons ===
Charlotte Chorpenning, a middle-aged Radcliffe graduate student, won the Harvard Prize for Between the Lines in November 1915. A three-act comedy with prologue and epilogue, it was an episodic tale in which no character appears in more than one scene. The play debuted at Castle Square Theatre in February 1916, with Craig and Young both taking featured parts in this ensemble work.

Craig awarded the Harvard Prize for the 1916–1917 season, to The Year of the Tiger by Kenneth Andrews. It was performed for the first time on April 24, 1917, with Josephine Victor in the lead as a missionary in Japan, where the playwright had lived for some years. Supporting her in the two-week run were William B. Mack and John Craig in a small role.

In late May 1917, Craig wound up his nine-year management of the Castle Square Theater with a final performance in the American premiere of a detective melodrama, Mr. Jubilee Drax, by Horace Annesley Vachell and Walter Hackett. Craig had the title role, with Peggy Wood as his leading lady. Two weeks later, Donald Meek headed the cast in The Blindness of Virtue, the final production at Castle Square under Craig's tenure.

== Overseas volunteers ==
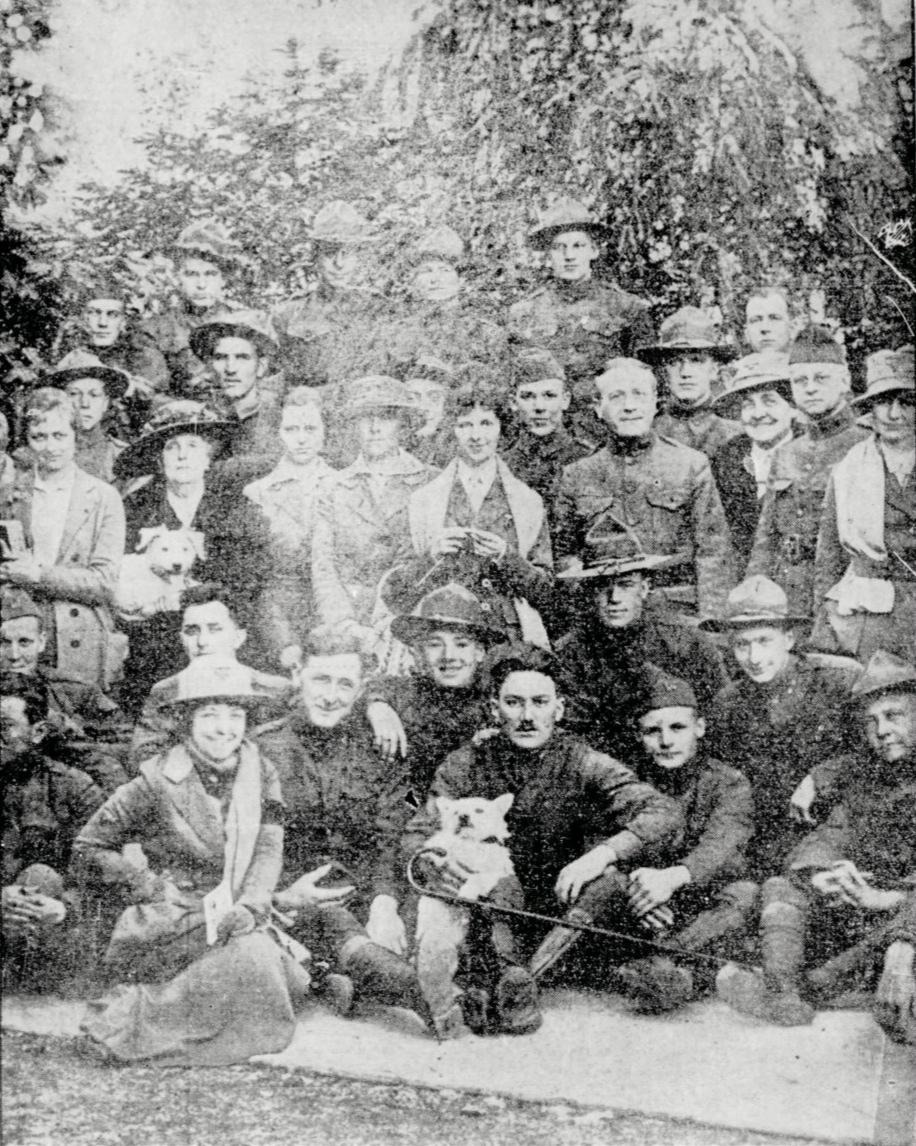

Craig's two sons, Harmon Bushnell Craig and John Richard Craig Jr., were among twenty-seven Harvard volunteers for the American Ambulance Field Service who sailed for France in February 1917. On July 16, 1917, Harmon Craig was mortally wounded by a shell while evacuating French casualties from the front at Dombasle, near Verdun. His brother Jack, who served in the same unit, was with him when he died a day later. The Boston Globe reported he was the "First Harvard undergraduate to be killed in the war". He was the namesake for his posthumous nephew, scientist Harmon Craig.

For the next six months neither Craig nor Mary Young performed on stage, though he attended to production commitments in New York City. In January 1918 they engaged a company of eight unpaid volunteers (Note: Ivy Troutman, Wilfred Young, Teresa Dale, Grace Louise Anderson, Graham Velsey, George Kinnear, and Robert Taber.) to go with them to France to perform for American troops. The company, sponsored by the YMCA, had a stock repertory of five plays. They sailed in February 1918, and by April were reported as playing Baby Mine at an American rest camp in France, while Craig also gave Shakespearean readings. The Boston Post printed a letter from Mary Young, written in late July 1918, in which she described an air raid that interrupted their rehearsal, and how they performed in huts without scenery or props to audiences of doughboys. Craig returned to Boston after the Armistice that ended the fighting.

== Arlington Theatre ==
The city of Boston renamed Castle Square to Arlington Square in February 1919; the theater was also renamed, to the Arlington Theatre. In August 1919, John Craig and Mary Young took the lease for the season. Their first production was Prisoner of the World, a new work which dealt with the fate of the Kaiser after the armistice. Craig played an American newspaper correspondent and Mary Young an Italian singer; among the cast members were William Powell, Charles Dalton, and Rose Coghlan. As a stock company, the John Craig Players were not affected by the month-long Actors' Equity strike then ongoing.

Craig decided to play Mercutio for a revival of Romeo and Juliet at the Arlington in October 1919, allowing William Powell to play Romeo to Mary Young's Juliet. This unusual six-act version also featured Charles Bickford as Tybalt. Craig was less generous with a revival of Hamlet, taking the title role and consigning William Powell to the Ghost, with Mary Young as Ophelia and Charles Bickford as Laertes. The Craig Players closed the first half of their season with the debut performance of The Outrageous Mrs. Palmer by Harry Wagstaff Gribble, which starred Mary Young in a role based on "a famous English actress". (Note: This was Mrs. Patrick Campbell according to a drama critic for the New-York Tribune.) Craig sublet the Arlington to an opera company for the winter, then reopened in February 1920 with a revised company for The Outrageous Mrs. Palmer, which now included Cora Witherspoon. A decided hit, the play continued until April 1920 at the Arlington. The Shuberts bought an interest in the play during March 1920, and took over the Arlington theatre itself the following month.

== Later career ==
Craig and the Shuberts jointly produced The Outrageous Mrs. Palmer on Broadway starting in October 1920. It again starred Young but Henry E. Dixey took Craig's part. This marked the initial divergence of Craig and Young's professional careers; they never again worked together on a major production. (Note: Outside of summer stock, their only collaboration after April 1920 was when he directed her in a limited engagement revival of Julius Caesar for the Player's Club in June 1927.)

In 1921 Craig portrayed Mr. Davis in Augustus Thomas's Nemesis at the Garrick Theatre in Philadelphia and on Broadway at the Hudson Theatre. He had a featured role as a prosecuting attorney, which Alexander Woollcott said was "quite the single best performance of the evening". The following season he was judged "convincing at times" but thought to overact at others in the drama Ambush. A longtime member of the Player's Club, Craig performed in or directed Shakespeare and Sheridan revivals for the benefit of that organization from 1922 through 1927.

During January 1923, Craig had a featured role as an adulterous professor in Jitta's Atonement, for which Burns Mantle said he was "capable" and "effective". In August that same year he appeared in The Woman on the Jury, another courtroom drama in which critic Arthur Pollock said he did "good work". For a revival of Morals, a 1910 German play, in late November 1925, Craig played a "bungling police assessor" with some first night jitters according to Burns Mantle.

His last original Broadway performance was in December 1929, for Diana, a four-act tragedy based on the life of Isadora Duncan. This controversial work by Irving K. Davis failed after one week, prompting the playwright to publicly assail critics for prejudging it on moral grounds. A few months later Craig performed his last Broadway role, as Sir Anthony Absolute for Mrs. Fiske's Mrs. Malaprop in a jinx-plagued opening of The Rivals. (Note: Co-producers Abe Erlanger and George C. Tyler, who should have known better, scheduled the debut for Friday, March 13, 1930, at Erlanger's Theater. When Erlanger died suddenly a week before the first night, it spooked a cast already on edge about the opening date. Andrew Mack, hired a day earlier on his assurance of knowing the lines for the part of Sir Lucius O'Trigger, fumbled them badly, while Mrs. Fiske forgot a cue and left Capt. Jack Absolute (Rollo Peters) and Lydia Languish (Margery Maude) stranded on stage "waiting to be discovered with no one to discover them".)

Craig made his only known film appearance as a fake prison chaplain who gets a condemned prisoner to admit his innocence, in Silence. This was made in June and July 1931, and released in August.

== Death ==
Although they had divorced a year earlier, Craig and Young had reconciled and were once more living together by Summer 1932. They had celebrated a family birthday party for Young, after which she drove him to the nearby train station in Woodmere, New York, on August 23, 1932. He was going into Manhattan to meet with fellow members of the Players Club, when he complained of chest pains. Young drove him back to their home where he died within a short time. The funeral service was conducted at home two days later, with an Episcopal rector officiating. His body is interred in a Brooklyn cemetery.

== Stage credits ==
Selected plays in which John Craig performed on stage.
Year	Play	Role	Venue	Notes/Sources
1891	The Taming of the Shrew	Lucentio	Daly's Theatre	Craig's first known stage credit and Broadway debut.
1891	As You Like It	Oliver de Boys	Daly's Theatre	
1892	The Foresters	Prince John Lackland	Daly's Theatre	
1892	The Last Word	Baron Von Stuyve	Academy of Music	Daly's adaptation of a German-language drama by Franz von Schoenthan.
1893	The Taming of the Shrew	A Lord	Daly's Theatre	The opening production for this venue.
1893	The Hunchback	Master Wilford	Daly's Theatre	
1894	Twelfth Night	Duke Orsino	Daly's Theatre	Craig's first leading man role in Daly's Company.
1894	As You Like It	Orlando de Boys	Daly's Theatre	
1894	The Last Word	Harry Rutherell	Hollis Street Theatre	Craig now had a leading role in these Daly Company standard.
1894	The School for Scandal	Joseph Surface	Hollis Street Theatre	Craig was less appreciated in Sheridan than in Shakespeare.
1894	Love on Crutches	Mr. Bitteredge	Hollis Street Theatre	Another of Daly's adaptations from German comedy.
1895	The Heart of Ruby	Ivasita	Hollis Street Theatre	Adaptation by Justin Huntly McCarthy of Judith Gautier's La Marchande des Sourires, set in Japan.
1896	A Midsummer Night's Dream	Lysander	Star Theater	Both Craig and his wife May Young (Titania) were credited in this production.
1897	The Tempest	Sebastian	Daly's Theatre	
1898	Shenandoah	Col. West	Grand Opera House	Craig had left Daly's Company for this Philadelphia stock company.
1898	The Ensign	Ensign Ben Baird	Grand Opera House	Historical drama based on the Trent Affair from 1861.
1899	The Wife	John Rutherford	Castle Square Theatre	Craig's first performance at the theatre he would eventually lease and manage.
1899	Sue	Ira Beasley	Castle Square Theatre	Three-act comedy based on The Judgment of Bolinas Plain by Bret Harte.
1900	With Flying Colors	Lt. Richard Dare	Castle Square Theatre	An American premiere for this British play and Mary Young's first Castle Square performance.
1900	What Happened to Jones	Jones	Castle Square Theatre	An 1897 farce about a salesman who deals in both prayer books and playing cards.
1900	Divorce	Alfred Adrianse	Castle Square Theatre	
1901	The Merchant of Venice	Shylock	Castle Square Theatre	
1901	The School for Scandal	Charles Surface	Castle Square Theatre	
1901	The Belle of Richmond	Gerald Gordon	Castle Square Theatre	Despite the name, a modern four-act crime melodrama by Sidney Toler.
1902	Hamlet	Prince Hamlet	Castle Square Theatre	
1902	Tess of the d'Urbervilles	Angel Clare	Manhattan Theatre	Revival of the 1897 adaptation by Lorimer Stoddard.
1902	The Drummer Boy of Shiloh	Mart Howard	Boston Theatre	Special one-week engagement for the Grand Army of the Republic annual encampment.
1902	As You Like It	Orlando de Boys	Castle Square Theatre	
1902	The Importance of Being Earnest	John Worthing	Castle Square Theatre	
1902	The Taming of the Shrew	Petruchio	Castle Square Theatre	
1902	Richard III	Richard III	Castle Square Theatre	Craig's first time in this role was also the first Shakespeare history play at Castle Square.
1903	The Ensign	Ensign Ben Baird	Castle Square Theatre	
1903	Othello	Othello	Castle Square Theatre	This production used the adaptation made by William Winter.
1903	Prince Karl	Prince Karl	Bijou Theatre	A four-act tragedy by A. C. Gunter, adapted to comedy by Richard Mansfield.
1903	Judith	Allan Ford	Star Theatre	Written by Ramsay Morris for Mary Mannering.
1904	The Charity Ball	Rev. John Van Buren	Keith's Providence	Domestic drama by David Belasco.
1904	Lord and Lady Algy	Lord Algy	Alcazar Theatre	Three-act 1898 comedy by R. C. Carton was Craig's performing debut in San Francisco.
1905	The Gay Lord Quex	Marquess of Quex	Alcazar Theatre	
1905	The Merchant of Venice	Shylock	Alcazar Theatre	This was the first Shakespeare in years for the Alcazar, and Mary Young's debut performance there.
1905	Vivian's Papas		Alcazar Theatre	1903 farce by Leo Ditrichstein, adapted from Le Premier Mari de France by Valabregne.
1905	Cleopatra	Marc Antony	Castle Square Theatre	Six-act romance adapted from the 1890 Cléopâtre by Victorien Sardou and Émile Moreau.
1905	Much Ado About Nothing	Benedick	Castle Square Theatre	First presentation of this Shakespeare play at the Castle Square theatre.
1905	Lady Windermere's Fan	Lord Darlington	Castle Square Theatre	
1905	She Stoops to Conquer	Young Marlow	Castle Square Theatre	
1906	Oliver Twist	Fagin	Castle Square Theatre	The first performance in Boston for this recent adaptation.
1906	Madame Sans Gene	François Joseph le Febvre	Castle Square Theatre	
1906	Julius Caesar	Brutus	Castle Square Theatre	The acting for the first performance of this work at Castle Square was harshly criticized.
1906	A Scrap of Paper	Prosper Couramont	Globe Theatre	John Palgrave Simpson adaptation of Les Pattes de Mouche by Victorien Sardou.
1907	An Enemy of the People	Dr. Thomas Stockman	Bijou Theatre	The Boston debut for this 1882 play.
1907	The Heart of Maryland	Alan Kendrick	Globe Theatre	
1907	The Soudan	Captain Temple	Harlem Opera House	A military melodrama by Augustus Harris and Henry Pettitt.
1908	The Road to Yesterday	Jack Greatorex/Reformade Jack	Castle Square Theatre	Dream sequence play, with Acts I and IV set in 1903, and the other two in 1603.
1908	The Devil	The Devil	Castle Square Theatre	Ferenc Molnár was reportedly indifferent to his play being pirated in North America.
1908	Strongheart	Strongheart	Castle Square Theatre	
1908	The Admirable Crichton	Crichton	Castle Square Theatre	
1908	The Circus Girl	Dick Capel	Castle Square Theatre	The first musical performed by Craig's company was a hit for Mary Young.
1909	The Runaway Girl	Guy Stanley	Castle Square Theatre	This musical revival starred Mary Young and Donald Meek, and ran for five weeks.
1909	The Geisha	Lt. Reginald Fairfax	Castle Square Theatre	
1910	The Love Route	John Ashby	Castle Square Theatre	Boston debut of this four-act comic drama by Edward Peple about a Texas railroad right-of-way.
1911	The End of the Bridge	John Garret, MD	Castle Square Theatre	The first winner of the Harvard Prize was by Florence Lincoln.
1912	The Product of the Mill	Henry Carmen	Castle Square Theatre	The second winner of the Harvard Prize was by Elizabeth McFadden.
1913	Believe Me, Xantippe	George MacFarland	Castle Square Theatre	The third winner of the Harvard Prize went to Broadway in August 1913.
1915	Common Clay	Judge Filson	Castle Square Theatre	The fourth winner of the Harvard Prize went to Broadway in August 1915.
1916	Between the Lines	Thomas Allen	Castle Square Theatre	The fifth winner of the Harvard Prize was a domestic comedy by Charlotte Chorpenning.
1917	The Year of the Tiger	Man in Leper Colony	Castle Square Theatre	The final Harvard Prize Play was a tale of unrequited love in Japan.
1917	Mr. Jubilee Drax	Jubilee Drax	Castle Square Theatre	Craig and Peggy Wood starred in this 1916 English four-act melodrama.
1918	Baby Mine		Doughboy camps in France	Lent free of charge by Margaret Mayo to Craig's troupe.
1918	Billeted		Doughboy camps in France	Three-act comedy, lent free of charge by H. M. Harwood to Craig's troupe.
1919	Prisoner of the World	Blythe	Arlington Theatre	Comic melodrama by Margaret Mayo and Henry James Forman.
1919	Romeo and Juliet	Mercutio	Arlington Theatre	This was Craig's first time playing Mercutio.
1919	The Outrageous Mrs. Palmer	Brandon Sullivan	Arlington Theatre	
1921	Nemesis	Davis	Hudson Theatre	George M. Cohan produced courtroom melodrama by Augustus Thomas in four acts.
1921	Ambush	Seymour Jennison	Garrick Theatre	Theatre Guild produced drama by Arthur Richman in three acts.
1923	Jitta's Atonement	Prof. Bruno Haldenstedt	Comedy Theatre	Craig's character dies of a heart attack in a bordello during Act I.
1923	The Woman on the Jury	Nellis	Eltinge Theatre	Craig played a juror in this emotional drama by Bernard K. Burns.
1925	Morals	Assessor Strobel	Comedy Theatre	A supporting role for Craig in this talkative farce by Ludwig Thoma.
1929	Diana	Paul Dilworth	Longacre Theatre	Four-act tragedy was blasted by critics on moral rather than dramatic grounds.
1930	The Rivals	Sir Anthony Absolute	Erlanger's Theatre	

== Filmography ==
- Silence (1931)

== Bibliography ==
- A Year of Opera at the Castle Square Theatre. C. E. French, Boston, 1896.
- Six Years of Drama at the Castle Square Theatre. C. E. French, Boston, 1903.
- Donald Knox. The Magic Factory: How MGM Made An American in Paris. Praeger Publishers, 1973.
- Margot Peters. Design for Living: Alfred Lunt and Lynn Fontanne. Knopf Doubleday Publishing Group, 2007. ISBN 9780307425515.
