= Dancing Mothers =

1926 film by Herbert Brenon

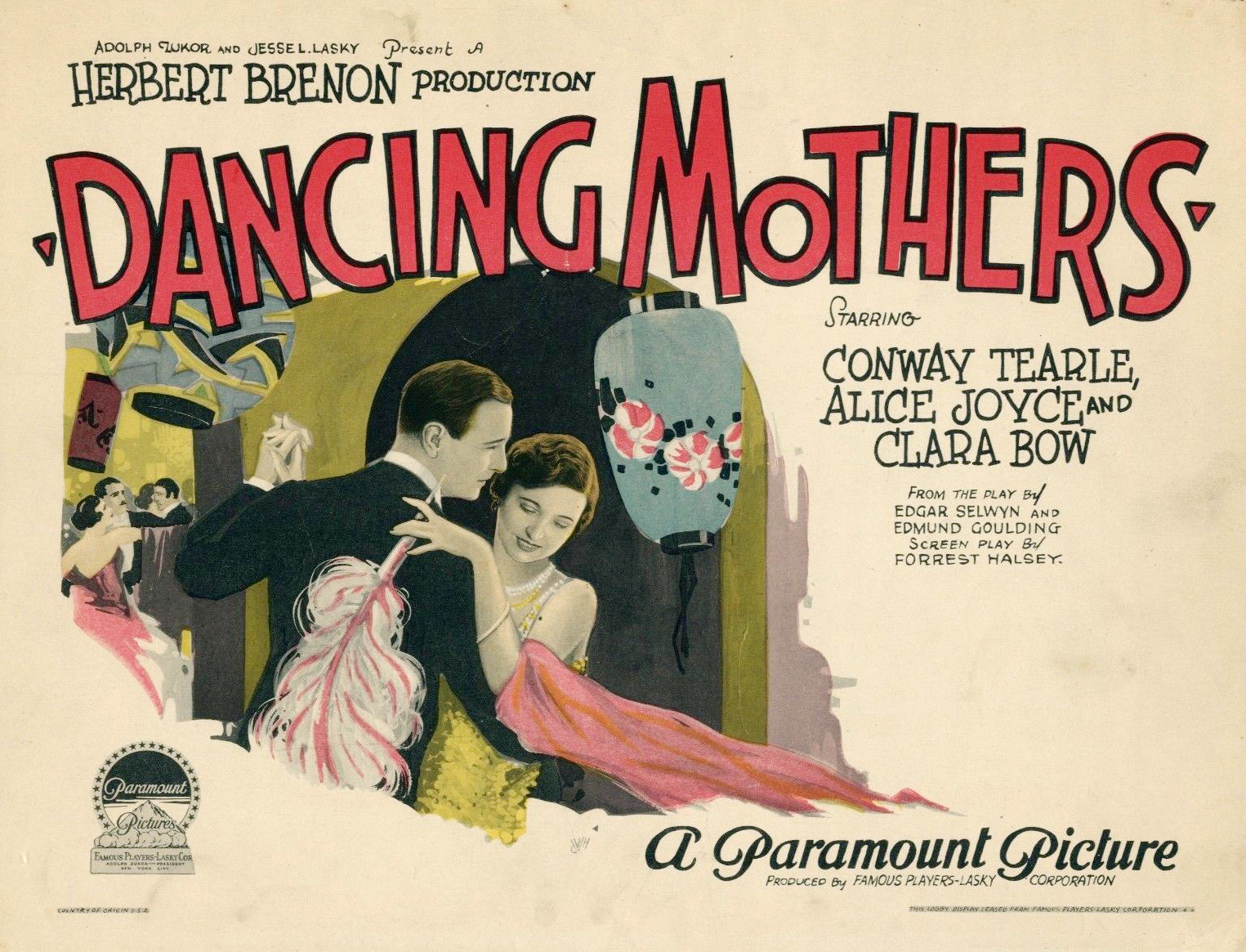
- Lobby card
- Directed by: Herbert Brenon
- Written by: Forrest Halsey (scenario)
- Based on: Dancing Mothers by Edgar Selwyn and Edmund Goulding
- Produced by: Adolph Zukor; Jesse Lasky
- Starring: Alice Joyce; Conway Tearle; Clara Bow
- Cinematography: J. Roy Hunt
- Production company: Paramount Pictures
- Distributed by: Paramount Pictures
- Release date: March 1, 1926
- Running time: 65 minutes (8 reels)
- Country: United States
- Language: Silent (English intertitles)

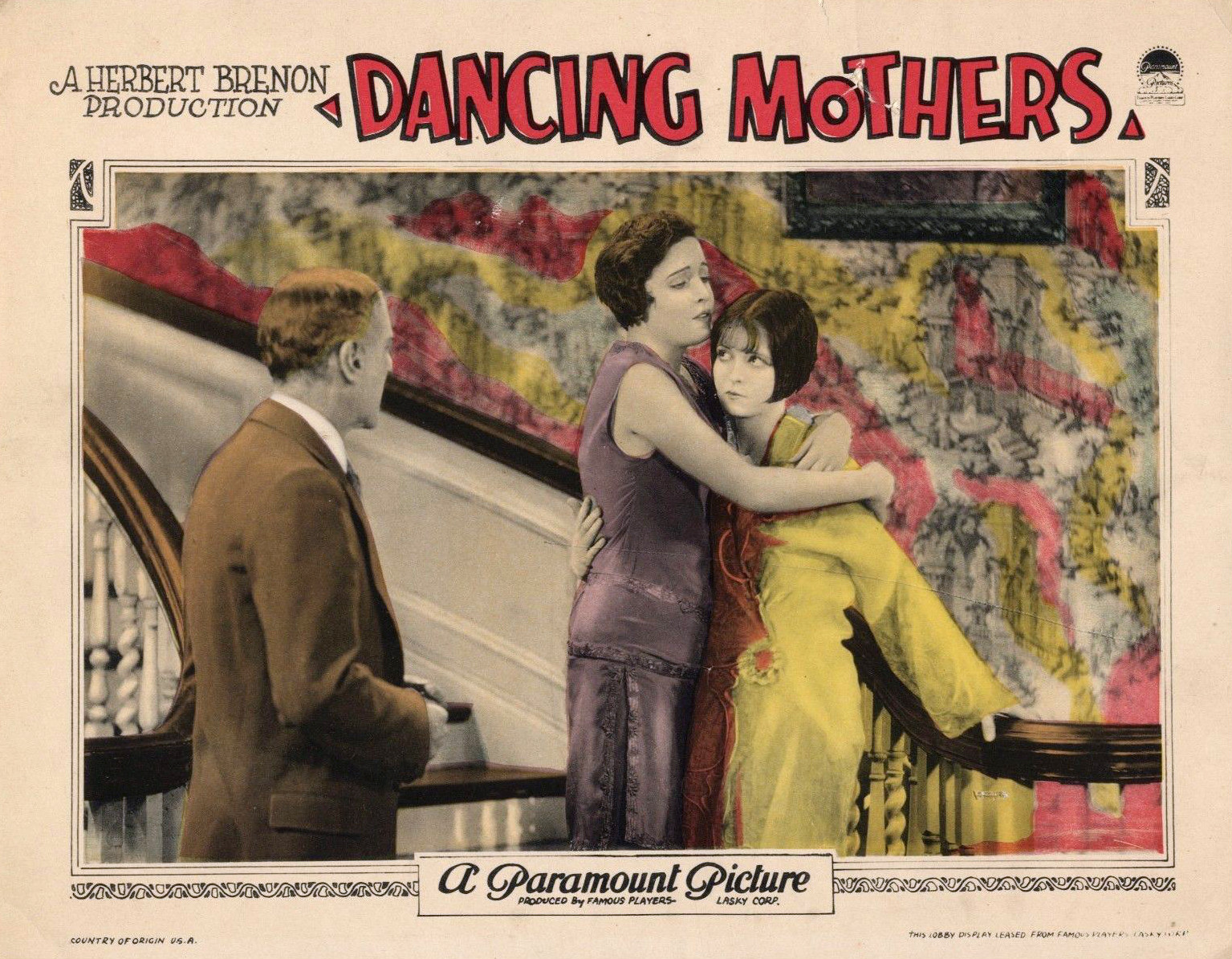
Lobby card

Dancing Mothers is a 1926 American silent drama film directed by Herbert Brenon, and stars Alice Joyce, Conway Tearle, and making her debut appearance for a Paramount film, Clara Bow. The film was released to the general public on March 1, 1926, by Paramount Pictures. The film tells the story of a pretty mother, who was almost cheated out of life by a heartless husband and a thoughtless daughter.

== Plot ==
As described in a film magazine review, a wealthy woman, whose daughter is carrying on a flirtation with a notorious man, steps between them, but finds that she herself is fascinated by the man. There follows a period of stress for both the older woman and her daughter, which ends with the daughter altering her mode of living and the mother deciding to leave her philandering husband and daughter and travel to Europe to forget.

== Cast ==
- Alice Joyce as Ethel "Buddy" Westcourt (played by Mary Young in play)
- Norman Trevor as Hugh Westcourt (played by Henry Stephenson in play)
- Clara Bow as Catherine "Kittens" Westcourt (played by Helen Hayes in play)
- Conway Tearle as Gerald "Jerry" Naughton (played by John Halliday in play)
- Eleanor Lawson as Irma (played also by Lawson in play; under the name Elsie Lawson)
- Dorothy Cumming as Mrs. Mazzarene
- Donald Keith as Kenneth Cobb
- Leila Hyams as Birdey Courtney
- Spencer Charters as Butter and Egg Man

== Production ==
Dancing Mothers was adapted from a successful Broadway stage play by Edgar Selwyn and Edmund Goulding, and Paramount reportedly bought the rights for $45,000. On Broadway the principal parts had been played by Helen Hayes as the daughter, John Halliday as the father, and Mary Young as the mother. Shooting began at Paramount's Astoria Studio in November 1925, after actress Betty Bronson, the star of Peter Pan (1924), was cast for the role of Katherine "Kittens" Westcourt by the studio, but was rejected after director Herbert Brennon reported to studio executives that "when she tried to be sexy, she looked like a little girl who wanted to go to the bathroom." After production ended in December 1925, Brennon reported to Paramount's top officials that Clara was not only very talented as an actress, but that she took direction very well.

== Reception ==
Reviews of the film tended to be positive:

- "A splendid picture containing mother appeal, flapper appeal and well balanced with comedy and a climax that's different, since 'they don't live happy ever after'".
- "...it is an effective drama, well acted and Clara Bow is a real little modern."
- "It is a picture that strikes home to the adult mind and is a tremendous indictment to every age."

== Preservation ==
The film survives in the Niles Essanay Silent Film Museum film vault and in private film collections (all of them are 16mm prints).
