= Silence (1931 film) =

1931 film

- Directed by: Louis J. Gasnier; Max Marcin
- Screenplay by: Max Marcin (play and screenplay)
- Starring: Clive Brook; Marjorie Rambeau; Peggy Shannon; Charles Starrett; Willard Robertson; John Wray; Frank Sheridan
- Cinematography: Charles Rosher
- Production company: Paramount Pictures
- Distributed by: Paramount Pictures
- Release date: August 29, 1931
- Running time: 60 minutes
- Country: United States
- Language: English

Silence is a 1931 American pre-Code crime film directed by Louis J. Gasnier and Max Marcin and written by Max Marcin, adapted from his play. The film stars Clive Brook, Marjorie Rambeau, Peggy Shannon, Charles Starrett, Willard Robertson, John Wray and Frank Sheridan. It was released on August 29, 1931, by Paramount Pictures.

== Plot ==
A gray-haired convict, within the shadows of the gallows, tells his story to the prison chaplain beginning twenty years earlier when he was sent to prison for a crime he did not commit.

== Cast ==
- Clive Brook as Jim Warren
- Marjorie Rambeau as Mollie Burke
- Peggy Shannon as Norma Davis / Norma Powers
- Charles Starrett as Arthur Lawrence
- Willard Robertson as Phil Powers
- John Wray as Harry Silvers
- Frank Sheridan as Joel Clarke
- Paul Nicholson as Walter Pritchard
- John M. Sullivan as Father Ryan
- Ben Taggart as Alderman Conners
- Charles Trowbridge as Mallory
- Wade Boteler as Detective
- Robert Homans as Detective
- John Craig as Fake Chaplain

== See also ==
- The House That Shadows Built (1931 Paramount promotional film with excerpts of Silence)
