= Mary Young (actress) =

American actress

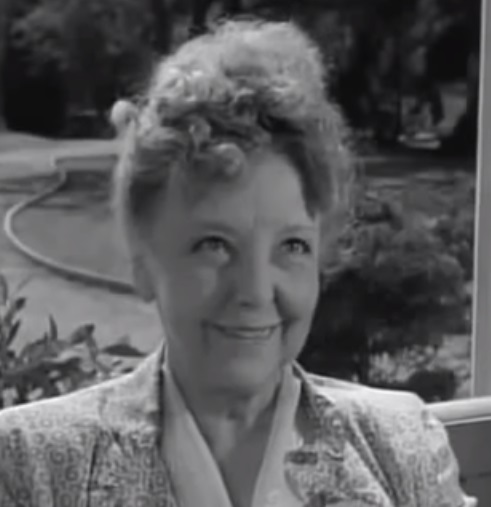
- Mary Young in Shock (1946)
- Born: Mary Marsden Young; June 21, 1879
- Died: June 23, 1971 (aged 92); La Jolla, California, U.S.
- Other names: Mary Marsden Young; Mrs. John Craig; Miss Mary Young
- Occupation: Actress
- Years active: 1899-1968
- Spouse: John Craig
- Children: 2

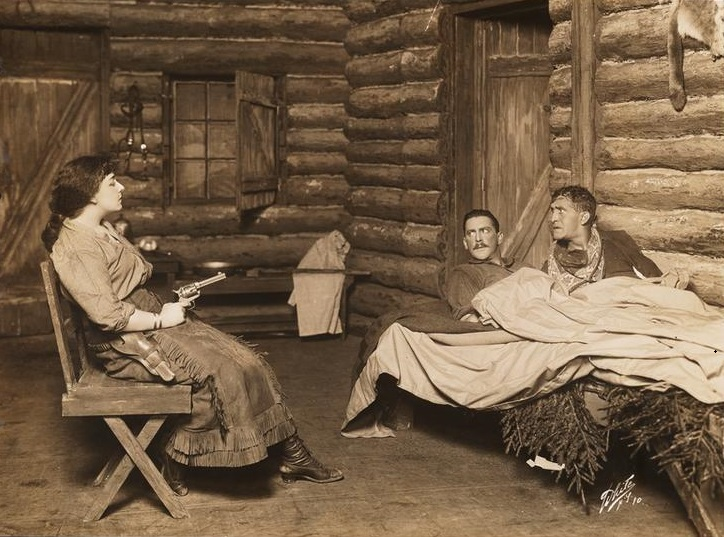
L to R: Mary Young, John Barrymore, Frank Campeau Believe Me, Xantippe a 1913 hit Broadway play

Mary Marsden Young (June 21, 1879 – June 23, 1971) was an American stage, film and television actress whose career spanned the first sixty years of the 20th century. She started her career in the theatre and ended playing elderly ladies in film and lastly on television.

Her first Broadway credit was in 1899. On stage she scored a memorable hit in 1913 playing opposite John Barrymore in the stage version of Believe Me, Xantippe. 1924 saw her on Broadway in Dancing Mothers opposite John Halliday and Helen Hayes, who played the daughter later made famous by Clara Bow in a silent film. Beginning in 1905, Young and her husband, actor John Craig, operated Boston's Castle Square Theatre for 21 years.

She was approaching 60 in 1937 when she made her first Hollywood movie. She made many television appearances in the 1950s and 1960s. Her last television appearance was in a 1968 episode of Gomer Pyle.

She and her husband, actor John Craig, had two children, the eldest of whom, Harmon Bushnell Craig, was killed at 22 while serving in World War I. Their other son, John Craig Jr., died in Los Angeles in 1945.

After several years of illness, Young suffered a fatal heart attack in La Jolla, California, on June 23, 1971, aged 92.

== Selected filmography ==
- The Angel of Crooked Street (1922) - Mrs. Marsh
- After Marriage (1925) - Mrs. James Morgan
- This Is My Affair (1937) - Dowager
- The Hound of the Baskervilles (1939) - Betsy Ann's Mother (uncredited)
- The Women (1939) - Grandma (uncredited)
- Foreign Correspondent (1940) - Auntie Maude (uncredited)
- The Wife Takes a Flyer (1942) - Old Lady (uncredited)
- Blondie for Victory (1942) - Mrs. Webster, Housewife of America (uncredited)
- The Navy Comes Through (1942) - Mrs. Duttson (uncredited)
- Watch on the Rhine (1943) - Mrs. Mellie Sewell
- Address Unknown (1944) - Mrs. Delaney
- Casanova Brown (1944) - Mrs. Dean (uncredited)
- The Lost Weekend (1945) - Mrs. Deveridge
- The Stork Club (1945) - Mrs. Edith Bates
- Shock (1946) - Mrs. Penny (uncredited)
- To Each His Own (1946) - Mrs. Nix
- The Bride Wore Boots (1946) - Janet Doughton
- Temptation (1946) - Mrs. McCormick (uncredited)
- Blondie's Holiday (1947) - Mrs. Breckenbridge
- A Likely Story (1947) - Little Old Lady
- A Double Life (1947) - Actress in 'A Gentleman's Gentleman'
- Song of Surrender (1949) - Miss Rivercomb (uncredited)
- One Too Many (1950) - Mrs. Sullivan
- The Mating Season (1951) - Spinster
- The Fat Man (1951) - Saleswoman (uncredited)
- An American in Paris (1951) - Flower Lady (uncredited)
- Joe Palooka in Triple Cross (1951) - Mrs. Reed, Tourist Stop Manager
- Walk East on Beacon (1952) - Old Lady (uncredited)
- It Should Happen to You (1954) - Elderly Customer at Macy's (uncredited)
- A Star Is Born (1954) - Boardinghouse Woman (uncredited)
- This Is My Love (1954) - Mrs. Timberly
- The Seven Year Itch (1955) - Woman in Train Station (uncredited)
- Around the World in Eighty Days (1956) - Extra (uncredited)
- Official Detective (1958, Episode: "The Silk Stocking Gang") - Mrs. Claudia Montgomery
- Alias Jesse James (1959) - 'Ma' James
- Blue Denim (1959) - Aunt Bidda
- Perry Mason (1961) - Mrs. Murdock
- The Trouble with Angels (1966) - Mrs. Eldridge
- Dead Heat on a Merry-Go-Round (1966) - Mrs. Galbrace (uncredited)
