= Castle Square Theatre =

Theatre in Boston, Massachusetts (1894–1932)

Coordinates: 42.34694°N 71.06893°W

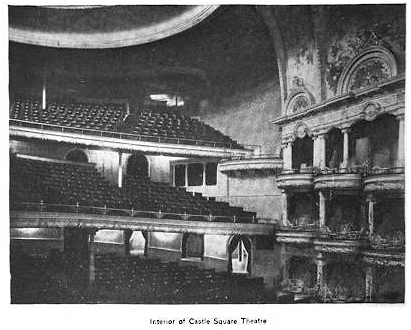
Castle Square Theatre, Boston, ca.1896

The Castle Square Theatre (1894–1932) in Boston, Massachusetts, was located on Tremont Street in the South End. The building existed until its demolition in 1933. The theatre was the Boston home of Henry W. Savage's Castle Square Opera Company, a touring opera company which had theaters in other cities like Chicago and New York City, but took its name from the Boston theatre.

When Castle Square was renamed to Arlington Square in February 1919, the theater's name was also changed to the Arlington Theatre.

Actors who worked in stock theater there included Edmund Breese.

== Notable people ==
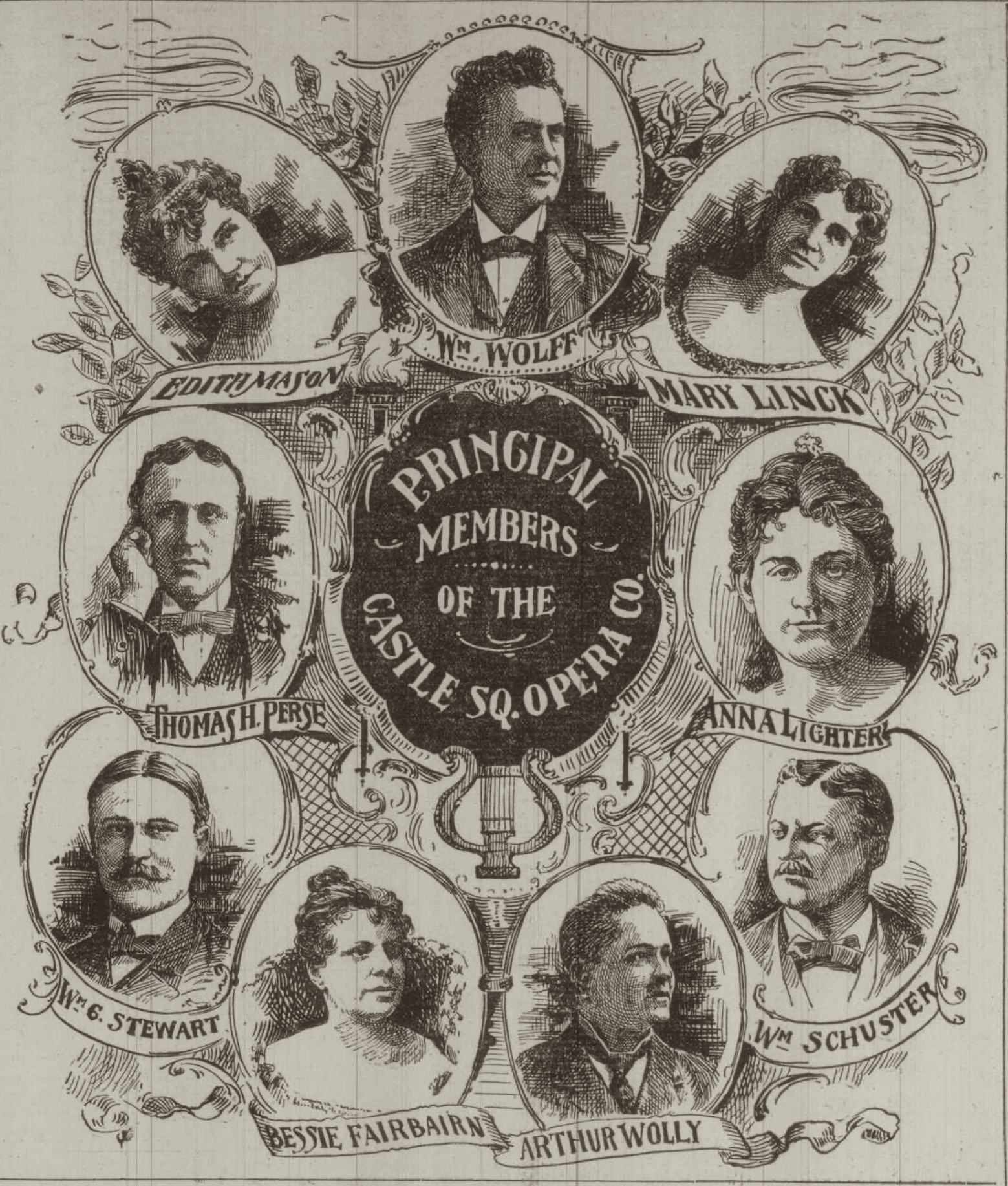
1896 sketch of Castle Square Opera Company

- Mabel Colcord
- John Craig
- Lillian Kemble
- Lillian Lawrence
- William Lavin
- Alfred Lunt
- Donald Meek
- Gertrude Quinlan
- Mary Young
