= Lillian Kemble =

American actress

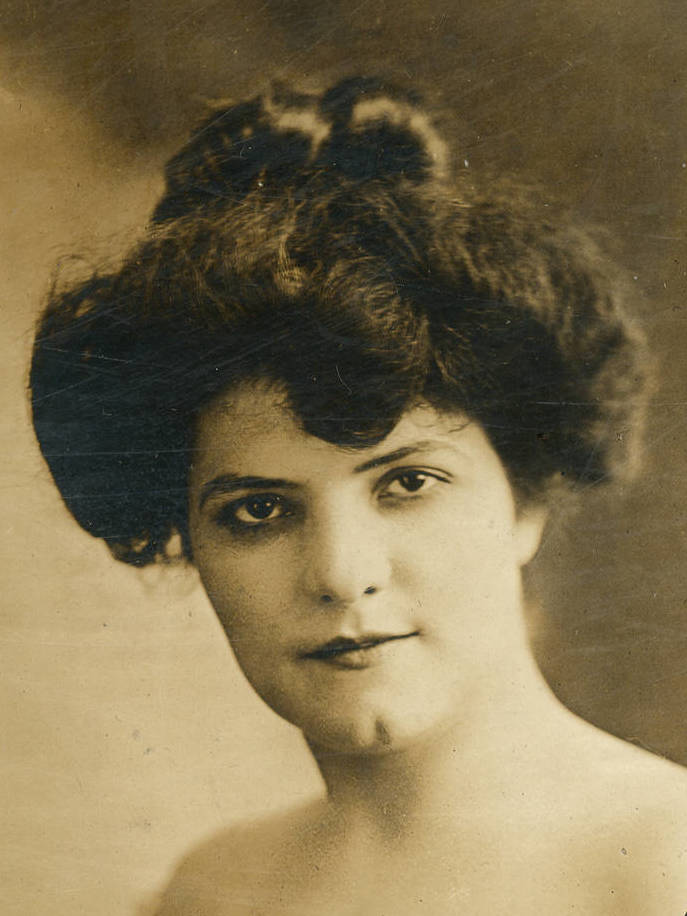
Lillian Kemble

Lillian Kemble (née Schmidt) (fl. 1900–1922) was an American stage and silent film actress. Born in Milwaukee, Wisconsin, (Note: Some sources state Philadelphia.) to Karl (Carl) Schmidt, a German immigrant comedian and theatre manager, she made her first stage appearance at the age of 10, performing in German and English. Lillian made her English-language debut at the Lyceum Theatre in Denver and worked with several stock companies across the country. She gained recognition on Broadway, starring in George Broadhurst's 1906 original production, The Man of the Hour. She was the leading lady with the Castle Square Theatre company in Boston for two seasons before joining the Poli Theatre Company in Washington, D.C. She also appeared in silent films, including a chief supporting role in The House of Mirrors (1916) with Frank Mills.

In 1898, she married the actor-singer Will S. Rising. They divorced in 1905, and a year later, Kemble became the co-respondent in the divorce case of fellow actor Charles D. Mackay and Georgie Elliott Porter, daughter of novelist Linn Boyd Porter. Shortly afterwards, Kemble and Mackay got married.
