= Kibitzer (disambiguation) =

Kibitzer is a Yiddish term for a person who offers (often unwanted) advice or commentary.

The term may also refer to:

- The Kibitzer, a 1930 American comedy film
- Sid Kibbitz, a Doonesbury character
