= Along Came Youth =

1930 film

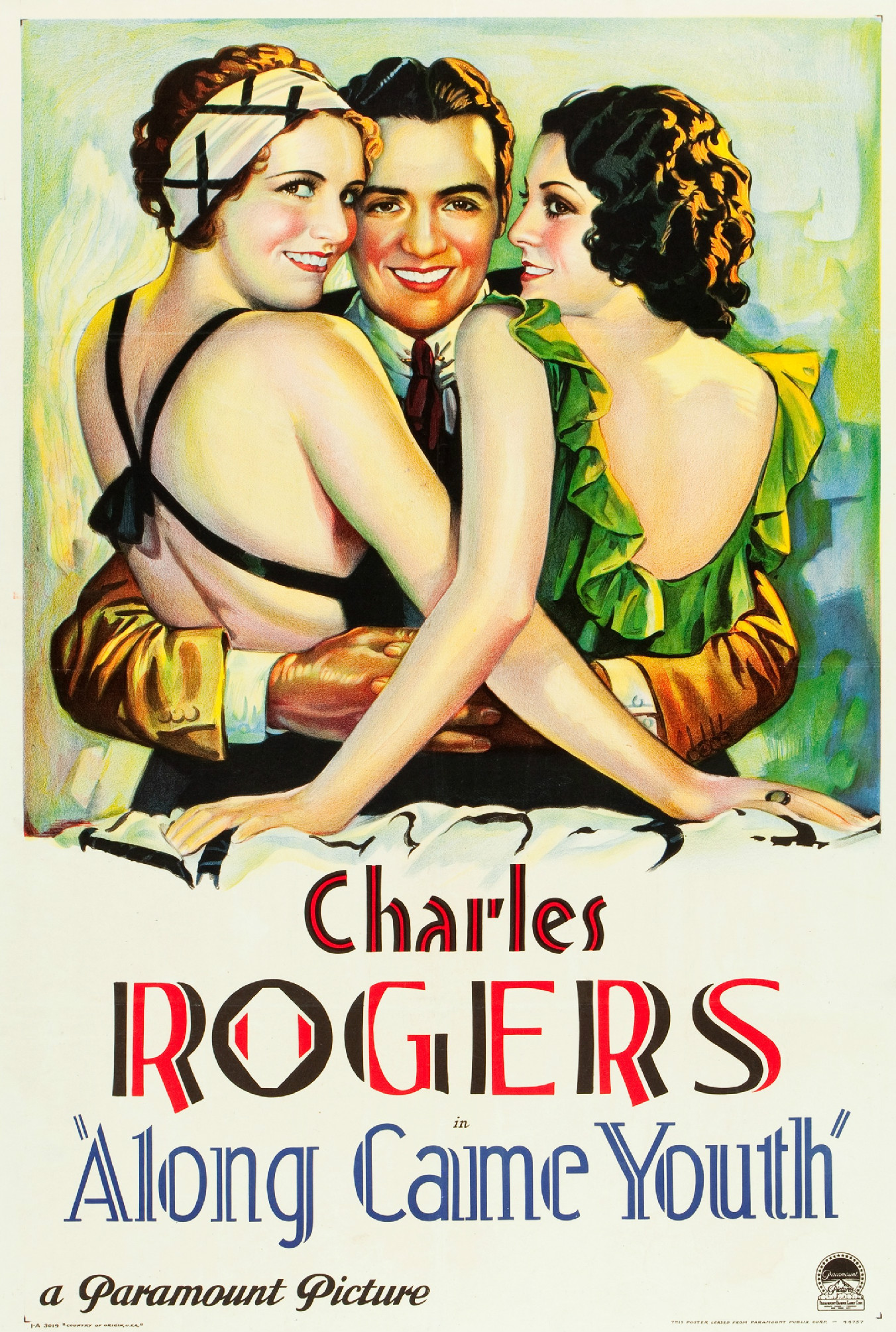
- Theatrical release poster
- Directed by: Lloyd Corrigan; Norman Z. McLeod
- Screenplay by: George Marion, Jr. Maurice Bedel; Marion Dix
- Starring: Charles "Buddy" Rogers; Frances Dee; Stuart Erwin; William Austin; Leo White; Betty Boyd
- Cinematography: Henry W. Gerrard
- Edited by: Jane Loring
- Music by: Karl Hajos
- Production company: Paramount Pictures
- Distributed by: Paramount Pictures
- Release date: December 20, 1930
- Running time: 74 minutes
- Country: United States
- Language: English

Along Came Youth is a 1930 American pre-Code comedy film directed by Lloyd Corrigan and Norman Z. McLeod and written by George Marion, Jr., Maurice Bedel and Marion Dix. The film stars Charles "Buddy" Rogers, Frances Dee, Stuart Erwin, William Austin, Leo White and Betty Boyd. The film was released on December 20, 1930, by Paramount Pictures.

== Cast ==
- Charles "Buddy" Rogers as Larry Brooks
- Frances Dee as Elinor Farrington
- Stuart Erwin as Ambrose
- William Austin as Eustace
- Evelyn Hall as Lady Prunella
- Leo White as Senor Cortés
- Betty Boyd as Sue Long
- Arthur Hoyt as Adkins
- Sybil Grove as Maid
- Herbert Sherwood as Doorman
- Charles West as Chauffeur
- Macon Jones as Neetsfoot Boy
- Billy Wheaton as Neetsfoot Boy
- George Ernest as Neetsfoot Boy
- Gordon Thorpe as Neetsfoot Boy
- John Strauss as Neetsfoot Boy
