= 39th Street Theatre =

Broadway theater (1910–1925)

Coordinates: 40°45′13″N 73°59′10″W

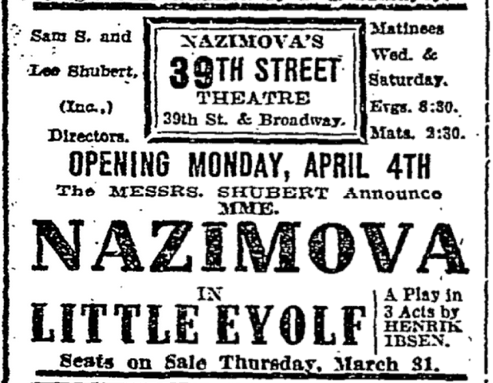
Advertisement for the opening night of the 39th Street Theatre

The 39th Street Theatre was a Broadway theatre in New York City located at 119 West 39th Street at the intersection of 39th and Broadway. Originally called Nazimova's 39th Street Theatre after the actress Alla Nazimova, it was in operation from 1910 to 1925 when it was demolished to make way for an office building. Throughout its existence, it was owned by the Shubert family. Its architect was William Albert Swasey, who had designed or remodelled several other Broadway theatres for the family.

== History ==
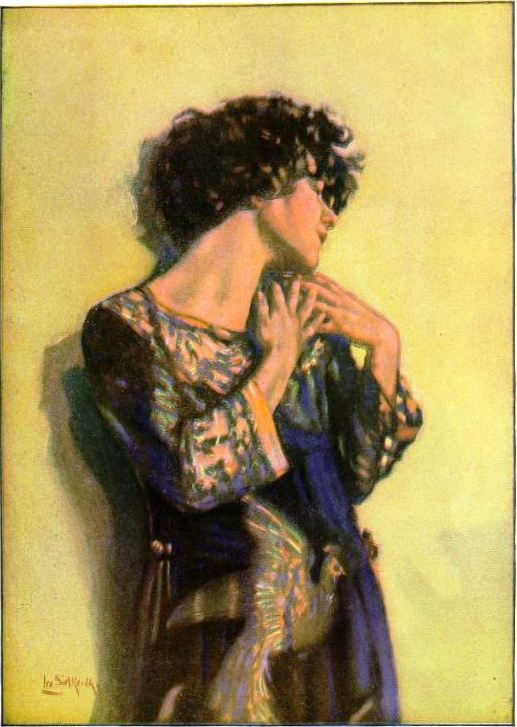
Alla Nazimova for whom the theatre was originally named

In 1906 the theatrical entrepreneur Lee Shubert had presented Alla Nazimova in matinee performances of three Ibsen plays and was reportedly "bewitched" by the beautiful Russian actress. Hoping to become a major producer of serious drama in New York and to continue promoting Nazimova, he built a new theatre on 39th Street and Broadway which he named Nazimova's 39th Street Theatre. After a two-week delay from the announced date of April 4, 1910, the theatre finally opened on April 18 with Nazimova starring as Rita Allmers in Ibsen's Little Eyolf. While her acting was praised by the critics, the play was not. The New York Times, pronounced it "peculiar" and The Evening Post termed it "dreary, unprofitable, and obnoxious."

Nazimova's business relationship with the theatre and Shubert was short-lived. By February 1911, she had signed with Charles Frohman instead. According to The Morning Telegraph, Shubert had offered her a guaranteed weekly salary of $1,500 and a 50% share of the profits as an inducement to remain with his organization, but to no avail. When Nazimova signed with Frohman, Shubert immediately removed her name from the theatre, and it was known as simply the 39th Street Theatre for the remainder of its existence.

Despite its parting of the ways with Nazimova, the 39th Street Theatre became a popular theatrical landmark. According to The New York Times, it was Diamond Jim Brady's favorite playhouse. Among the plays presented there were The Second Mrs. Tanqueray starring Mrs. Leslie Carter; A. E. W. Mason's Green Stockings. starring Margaret Anglin; and Believe Me, Xantippe starring John Barrymore, Mary Young, and Frank Campeau. One of its longest-running plays was Cosmo Hamilton's Scandal which ran for thirty-nine weeks. The shortest was A Little Bit of Fluff. According to The New York Times, it opened and closed on the same night in August 1916.

In May 1925 the Shubert Organization sold the theatre to A. E. Lefcourt, a real estate developer who was to erect a 20-story building with offices and showrooms on the site. The 39th Street Theatre was demolished in December of that year. During its existence, it had seen over 21,600 performances.

== Architecture ==
The architect of the 39th Street Theatre was William Albert Swasey, who had designed or remodelled several other Broadway theatres for the Shubert family. The construction work carried out by John McKeefry who had also built Maxine Elliott's Theatre. The theatre's exterior was designed in Italian Renaissance style while the interior decorations and fittings were described as being in Louis XVI style. The interior's color scheme was in old rose and antique gold. The ceiling of the auditorium was illuminated by four gold sunbursts, each containing fifty lights, while the floor and walls of the vestibule were finished in imported marble.

The theatre was small by Broadway standards, seating approximately 675 people on three levels. The plan was to present plays "in an intimate setting." The stage was 26 feet deep with a proscenium opening 80 feet wide by 30 feet tall. There was an elevator to bring playgoers to the balcony and gallery floors. The theatre was also equipped with a sprinkler system and fourteen exits in addition to the main entrance which meant that it could be evacuated in under a minute in case of a fire. Both Lee Shubert and his brother J.J. Shubert had private offices in the building which were finished in antique oak wainscotting.
