= Believe Me, Xantippe =

1918 film by Donald Crisp

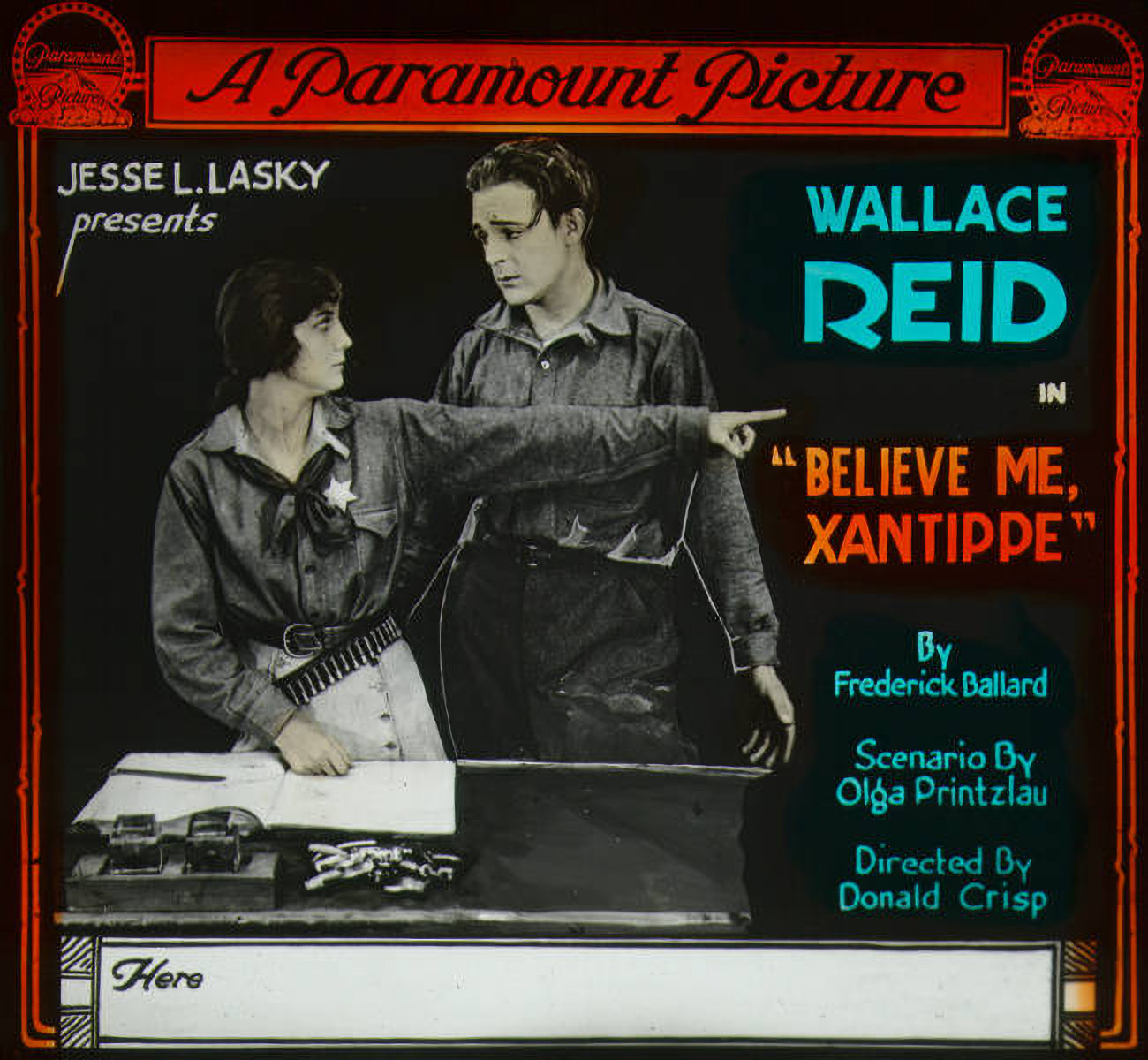
- 1918 lantern card
- Directed by: Donald Crisp
- Written by: Olga Printzlau (scenario)
- Based on: Believe Me Xantippe by John Frederick Ballard
- Produced by: Jesse L. Lasky
- Starring: Wallace Reid; Ann Little
- Cinematography: Henry Kotani
- Distributed by: Paramount Pictures
- Release date: June 2, 1918
- Running time: 50 minutes
- Country: United States
- Language: Silent (English intertitles)

Believe Me, Xantippe is a 1918 American silent romantic comedy film produced by Jesse Lasky for release through Paramount Pictures. The film was directed by actor/director Donald Crisp and stars Wallace Reid and Ann Little. The film is based on a 1913 William A. Brady-produced play Believe Me Xantippe by John Frederick Ballard, which on the Broadway stage had starred John Barrymore.

== Plot ==
As described in a film magazine, George MacFarland makes a bet with two of his friends that, having committed a forgery, he will be able to elude the officers of the law for one year. As his friends are very thorough, he does not find it an easy matter getting around town. He finally goes to a small town in the west where he lives unmolested for eleven months.

On a hunting expedition he meets Dolly Kamman, daughter of Sheriff Kamman, who takes George to meet her father. As Dolly has fallen in love with George's photograph, he is a somewhat privileged prisoner. On the day the bet is off George hears that his friends have drowned and he is sure he is to be sent to Sing Sing. The arrival of the boys, however, changes things, and in addition to being set free George wins Dolly.

== Cast ==
- Wallace Reid as George MacFarland (portrayed by John Barrymore on stage)
- Ann Little as Dolly Kamman (portrayed by Mary Young on stage)
- Ernest Joy as Thornton Brown
- Henry Woodward as Arthur Sole
- Noah Beery as Sheriff Kamman (portrayed by Theodore Roberts on stage)
- James Cruze as Simp Calloway (portrayed by Frank Campeau on stage)
- Winifred Greenwood as Violette
- Jim Farley as Detective Thorne
- Charles Ogle as Wren Wrigley
- Clarence Geldart as William

== Preservation ==
Believe Me, Xantippe is currently presumed lost. In February of 2021, the film was cited by the National Film Preservation Board on their Lost U.S. Silent Feature Films list.

== See also ==
- Xanthippe, wife of Socrates
- Wallace Reid filmography
