= Fred Ballard =

What's Wrong, a comedy in three acts readable pdf

Young America; a play in three acts readable pdf

John Frederick Ballard (1884 – September 24, 1957) was a playwright. Some of his plays were adapted to film.

Born in Grafton, Nebraska, he moved with his family to Havelock, Nebraska in 1891. He graduated with a bachelor's degree from the University of Nebraska in 1905 and a Master's in English Literature in 1907. He moved to Chicago to work in theater. He also studied Creative Writing at Harvard University.

He married. In the later years of his life he moved back to Nebraska from New Jersey. The University of Nebraska has a collection of his papers.

== Plays ==
- Believe Me Xantippe (1912) - Winner of the third annual Harvard Prize.
- What's Wrong
- We, the People
- A Rainy Day
- Out of Luck
- The Cyclone Lover
- 320 College Avenue
- Dollars and Chickens
- Ladies of the Jury

== Filmography ==
- Believe Me, Xantippe (1918)

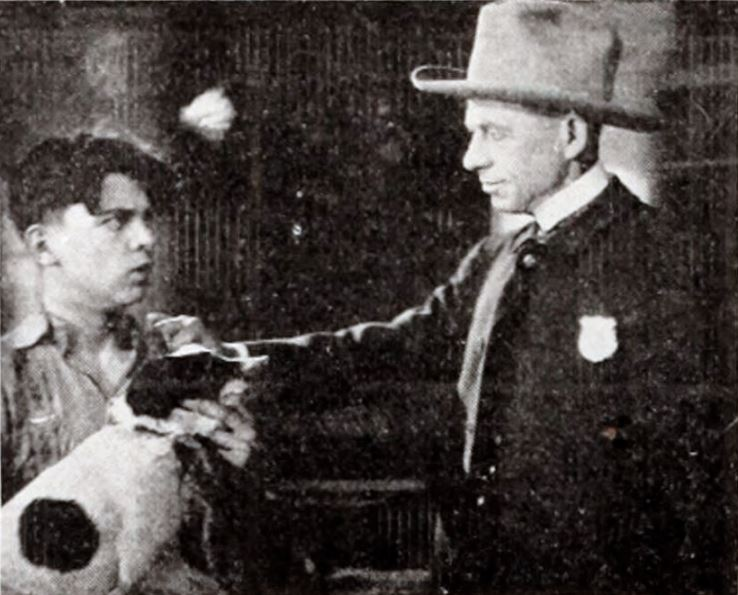
Still from the 1918 film Young America

- Young America (1918)
- Young America (1932)
- Ladies of the Jury (1932)
- We're on the Jury (1937)
- When's Your Birthday? (1937)
