= Believe Me, Xantippe (play) =

1912 play by John Frederick Ballard

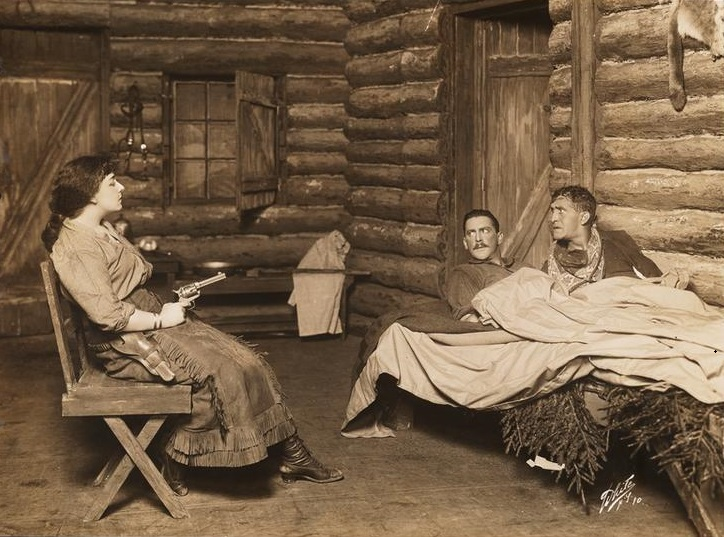
- Mary Young, John Barrymore, and Frank Campeau in Believe Me, Xantippe
- Original language: English
- Written by: John Frederick Ballard
- Subject: Fugitive finds romance
- Genre: Melodramatic Farce
- Setting: Apartment in NYC; Hunting Shack in Southwest Colorado; County Jail in Delta, Colorado.

Premiere
- Date: August 19, 1913
- Place: 39th Street Theatre
- Directed by: George Henry Trader (Boston); John Craig (Broadway)

Believe Me, Xantippe is a play written in 1912 by John Frederick Ballard, while a postgraduate student at Harvard University. Its author labelled it a comedy, but reviewers judged it a melodramatic farce. It has four acts, with three settings and ten characters. The story concerns a bet that an intelligent man can avoid being apprehended for a minor crime. The action of the play spans one years time.

The play won the third annual Harvard Prize, also referred to as the John Craig Prize, given each year to the best work produced in conjunction with George Pierce Baker's drama courses at Harvard and Radcliffe. The title is a favorite expression of the main character in the play; it uses a variant spelling of Xanthippe. The title originally concluded with an exclamation point, which was dropped before it reached Broadway.

Believe Me, Xantippe! was first produced by John Craig, staged by George Henry Trader, and featured Craig and members of the Castle Square Theatre stock company, including Craig's wife Mary Young, Donald Meek, and Mabel Colcord. The opening engagement at Boston started in January 1913 and ran through to April 1913, for 132 performances.

William A. Brady and the Shuberts joined John Craig to produce the retitled Believe Me, Xantippe for Broadway. John Craig restaged it, while the stars were John Barrymore and Mary Young. The play made its Broadway premiere in August 1913, running through October 1913.

The play was never revived on Broadway, but was adapted for a 1918 silent film, now considered lost.

== Characters ==
Characters are listed in order of appearance within their scope, as according to the published play.

Lead

- George MacFarland is 28, a New York City gentleman of independent means.
- Dolly Kamman is 19, vivacious and self-reliant, a good shot and a good rider.

Supporting

- Thornton Brown called Thornt, is 30, an attorney and MacFarland's friend.
- Arthur Sole is 45, a tall, thin detective with his own agency, a friend of Brown.
- Buck Kamman is 50, a Colorado sheriff, a widower and father of Dolly.
- Wrenn Rigley is 40, big bulky jailer for Sheriff Kamman in Delta, Colorado.

Featured

- William is 35, MacFarland's valet.
- Simp Calloway is 35, a wiry, medium-sized desperado, with a facial scar.
- Martha is 40 and single, Dolly's maternal aunt, who wants to send her to Boston for college.
- Violet is 35 and a bottle blonde; brassy, a mining camp gal, partial to Simp.

== Synopsis ==
The 1918 published play divides the work into four acts, as does the Boston production synopsis. However, from Broadway reviews, it appears the play was presented there in three acts, with the last act broken into two scenes, separated by a brief curtain. The following synopsis conforms to the published play.

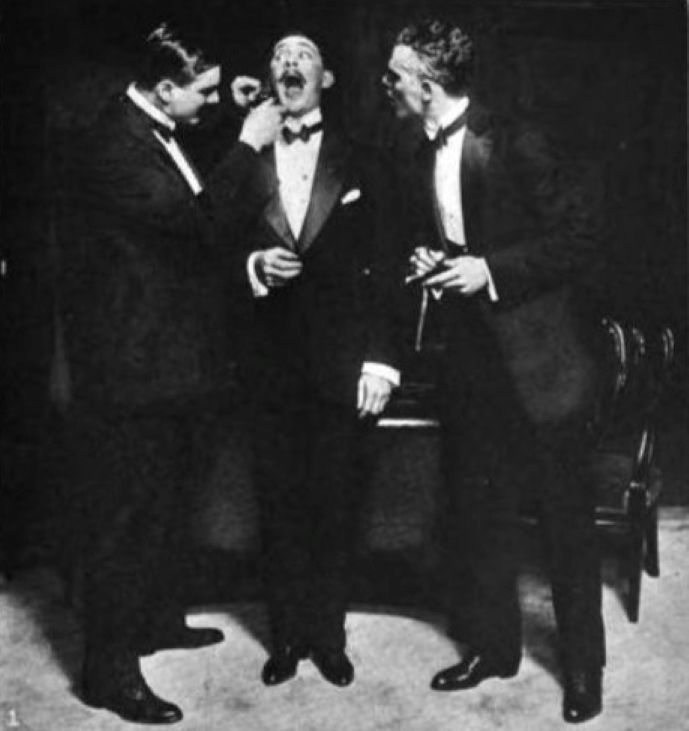

Act I (MacFarland's Apartment at Sherry's in NYC. October 5th) Incensed by a burglary at his apartment, George MacFarland tells his friend Thornton Brown that police, detectives, and sheriffs are incapable of catching any crooks but the most incompetent. Brown demurs, but MacFarland insists, offering to bet $10,000 he could avoid arrest for a year. Brown takes him on, and telephones his detective friend Arthur Sole, who upon arrival also agrees to bet $20,000. MacFarland takes one of Brown's blank checks and forges his signature for $100, payable to George E. MacGinniss, the alias he'll adopt in flight. Sole pays him $100 cash for the forged check and offers to try depositing it, so as to trigger the forgery's discovery. The bet is lost if any detective or law enforcement officer within the US arrests MacGinnis within one year's time. The three of them agree that only they should know of the bet and that MacGinnis is really MacFarland. Sole takes detailed physical measurements of MacFarland, and borrows a photo of him. Brown lets Sole know quietly that MacFarland is partial to using the expression "Believe me, Xantippe". Sole cautions MacFarland that upon arrest, he must immediately wire Brown or himself, to avoid being incarcerated. MacFarland, using a ruse, escapes from the apartment unnoticed, taking Sole's hat with him. (Curtain)

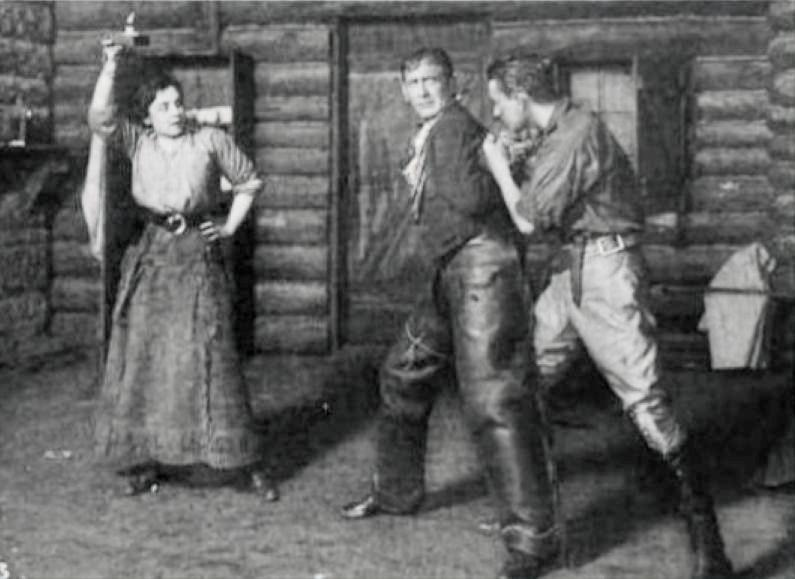

Act II (Hunting Shack in Southwest Colorado. September 30th, following year.) Buck and Dolly Kammen have been staying at the shack while hunting. Buck has to return to town, but Dolly persuades him to let her stay one more night. While she sees off her father, MacFarland enters from another door. He is surprised by the returning Dolly. Realizing he is a tenderfoot, Dolly coaxes from him the admission that he can neither shoot nor ride. Despite his scruffy appearance, Dolly is at ease with him, until he utters the phrase "Believe me, Xantippe". She disarms him, and forces him to climb into a camp bed, since it is night and she can't take him to jail in the dark. While they converse, Simp Calloway enters quietly, catching Dolly unaware. Recognizing him, she allows him to think she is MacFarland's wife. A series of comical twists and turns ends with MacFarland catching Simp in the dark, and tying him up when Dolly lights a candle. Simp is stowed in the bed. Dolly has no intention of letting MacFarland escape, even though he helped her. At gunpoint, she makes him climb into bed beside Simp. She tells the men she never got a deer while hunting, but has now "bagged two bucks". (Curtain)

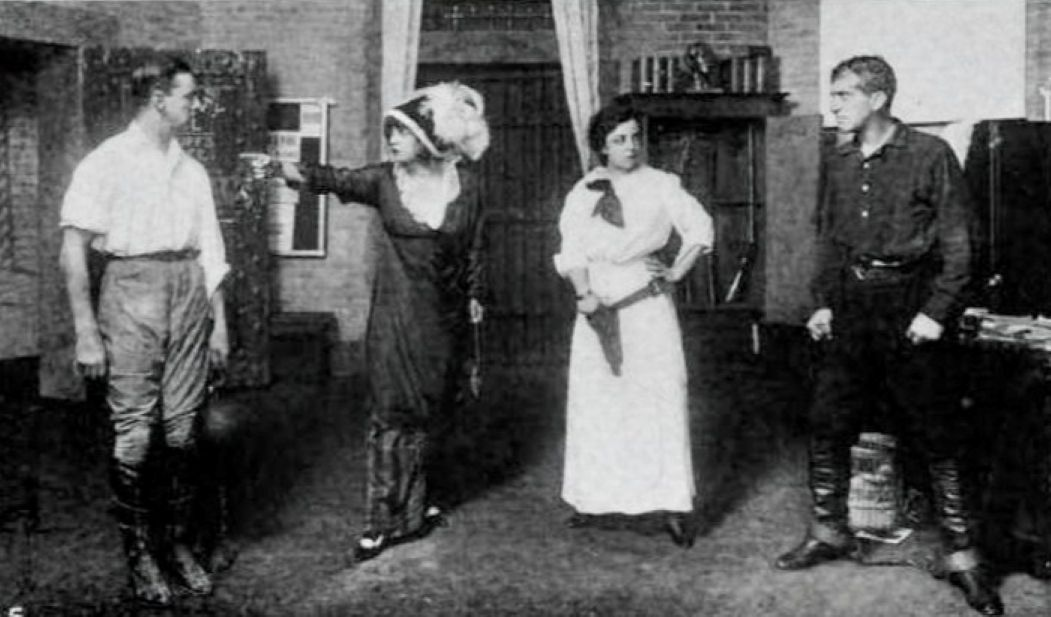

Act III (Sheriff's office at county jail in Delta, Colorado. Two days later.) Dolly had brought her prisoners into Delta, where they now sat in separate cells (off stage). Buck was so pleased with his daughter that he made her a deputy sheriff. On the jail house wall is a "Wanted" poster for MacGinnis, offering a $5000 reward. (Note: None of the characters stops to wonder why a $5000 reward is offered for a $100 forgery.) Dolly outargues Wrenn Rigley, whose orders were to keep everyone out of the cell block. She visits MacFarland in his cell, while first Buck Kammen and then Martha arrive. They are outraged when Dolly strolls out of the cell block. Later MacFarland strolls into the jail office to give Dolly his cell's key, which she had left in the lock. She learns from him the story of the wager that led to him becoming a fugitive. Dolly then sends the telegrams to Sole and Brown for MacFarland. Meanwhile, Violet tries to get Simp Calloway sprung from jail by accusing MacFarland of being one of their gang, The only result is she winds up in a cell next to Simp. (Curtain)

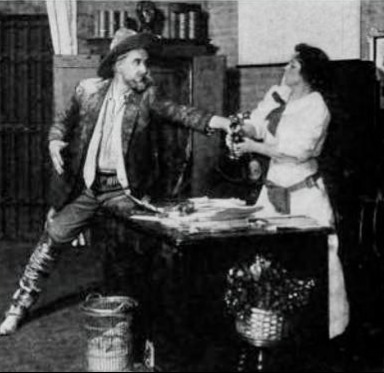

Act IV (Same as Act III. Four days later.) Buck Kammen is summoned by telephone to the scene of holdup near the town. The eastern "lawmen" are due at the railroad station to pick up MacFarland. As a joke, Brown sends a telegram to MacFarland at the jail, falsely claiming the duo were lost at sea. Dolly, realizing MacFarland will now be imprisoned for forgery, releases him and gives him a horse on which to get away. So inept at riding is MacFarland that he falls off the horse at Aunt Martha's house and she recaptures him. Dazed by the fall, he does not resist as she brings him to jail in a wheelbarrow. Buck returns and is impressed with his sister-in-law's resourcefulness. Martha and Buck rebuke Dolly for having let him escape. Dolly is stunned when Sole and Brown are introduced. Buck is upset that the whole fandango was for a prank wager. Sole tells MacFarland he has lost the bet since Dolly is a deputy sheriff, which the latter accepts. However, Dolly corrects Sole: she wasn't made a deputy until after she brought in MacFarland and Simp Calloway. Sole and Brown give MacFarland the checks totaling $30,000. Buck hugs Martha, evidently seeing her in a new light. They all leave quietly as MacFarland woos Dolly. Wrenn comes in, sees the situation, and quickly leaves. MacFarland proposes to Dolly, saying he "will be her prisoner for life", and she accepts. (Curtain)

== Original production ==
=== Background ===
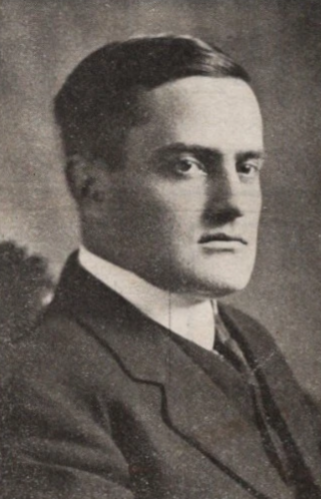
John Frederick Ballard 1912

John Frederick Ballard was from Lincoln, Nebraska, and a 1905 graduate of the University of Nebraska. He spent two years working on a ranch in Colorado, then went to Chicago where he worked at the Illinois Theatre, first as a stage hand then as a property man. According to a newspaper report, the Colorado characters in the play were based on real people and events. There really was a Dolly Cammann in Delta, Colorado, whose father Sheriff Buck Cammann had made her a deputy for capturing a horse thief named Simp Calloway.

Ballard enrolled in Professor Baker's English 47 Playwriting Workshop while earning a Master of Arts degree from Harvard University. His Believe Me, Xantippe! won the $500 John Craig Prize in November 1912. The judges for this year's competition were playwright Edward Sheldon, Horace B. Stanton, and John Craig. Craig was the actor-manager of the Castle Square Theatre Stock Company in Boston. Each year he offered a prize to the Harvard or Radcliffe graduate or undergraduate who wrote the best play. Besides the monetary prize, the award carried with it the promise of a production mounted by the Castle Square Theatre stock company, with the playwright receiving three per cent of gross profits.

Reports of the prize emphasized that it was the first won by a Harvard man, the previous two prizes having gone to women from Radcliffe. (Note: These were Florence Lincoln in 1910 for The End of the Bridge and Elizabeth McFadden for The Product of the Mill in 1911.) Even before the first presentation of Believe Me, Xantippe!, John Craig had purchased rights to another John Frederick Ballard play, titled We, the People. Rehearsals had begun by January 12, 1913, held mornings at the Castle Square Theater, directed by George Henry Trader.

=== Cast ===
Cast during the Boston engagement.
Role	Actor	Dates	Notes and sources
George MacFarland	John Craig	Jan 20, 1913 - Apr 05, 1913	
Dolly Kamman	Mary Young	Jan 20, 1913 - Apr 05, 1913	Young was John Craig's wife and leading lady for the Castle Square Theatre stock company.
Thornton Brown	George Henry Trader	Jan 20, 1913 - Apr 05, 1913	
Arthur Sole	Wilson Melrose	Jan 20, 1913 - Apr 05, 1913	
Buck Kammen	Walter Walker	Jan 20, 1913 - Apr 05, 1913	
Wrenn Rigley	Al Roberts	Jan 20, 1913 - Apr 05, 1913	Besides his role, Roberts also acted as stage manager.
William	Egbert Munro	Jan 20, 1913 - Apr 05, 1913	Munro was also the assistant stage manager.
Simp Calloway	Donald Meek	Jan 20, 1913 - Mar 15, 1913	
Simp Calloway	Frederick Ormonde	Mar 17, 1913 - Apr 05, 1913	Ormonde was a new cast member when he took over this part.
Aunt Martha	Mabel Colcord	Jan 20, 1913 - Apr 05, 1913	
Violet	Laurett Browne	Jan 20, 1913 - Apr 05, 1913	

Cast during the Broadway run.
Role	Actor	Dates	Notes and sources
George MacFarland	John Barrymore	Aug 19, 1913 - Oct 25, 1913	
Dolly Kamman	Mary Young	Aug 19, 1913 - Oct 25, 1913	
Thornton Brown	Henry Hull	Aug 19, 1913 - Oct 25, 1913	
Arthur Sole	Alonzo Price	Aug 19, 1913 - Oct 25, 1913	
Buck Kammen	Theodore Roberts	Aug 19, 1913 - Sep 29, 1913	
Buck Kammen	M. Tello Webb	Sep 30, 1913 - Oct 25, 1913	Webb took on a second role, replacing Roberts after a warrant was sworn on him for unpaid alimony.
Wrenn Rigley	Albert Roberts	Aug 19, 1913 - Sep 27, 1913	Aside from Mary Young, Al Roberts was the only Boston cast member to go to Broadway with this play.
Wrenn Rigley	Earl Mitchell	Sep 29, 1913 - Oct 25, 1913	Mitchell is credited as both "Earl" and "Earle".
William	M. Tello Webb	Aug 19, 1913 - Oct 25, 1913	
Simp Calloway	Frank Campeau	Aug 19, 1913 - Oct 25, 1913	
Aunt Martha	Alpha Beyers	Aug 19, 1913 - Oct 25, 1913	
Violet	Katherine Harris	Aug 19, 1913 - Oct 25, 1913	Harris was married to John Barrymore during the time this play was produced on Broadway.

=== Opening engagement ===
The first presentation of Believe Me, Xantippe occurred on January 20, 1913, at the Castle Square Theatre in Boston. The Boston Globe reviewer reported that the play was "performed with éclat", which they attributed to a Harvard man finally winning the prize. They also noted that three theater boxes "were filled with Mr. Ballard's fellow members of the Acacia fraternity" who cheered him on at the intervals. The term "comedy" as applied to the play was rejected by the reviewer in favor of "farce comedy".

The critic for the Boston Evening Transcript noted the play was farce and melodramatic, thought it good fun if nowhere near serious literature or drama. They saluted the acting of all, particularly Donald Meek as the villain. Their sole caution was for Mary Young, "who made Dolly western and plausible in everything but her pronunciation of 'aunt'. Go to the ant, thou Boston, and be flat". The play closed at the Castle Square Theatre on April 5, 1913, after a run of 132 performances. (Note: The Castle Square Theatre stock company under John Craig performed 12 times weekly: six matinees and six evening shows.)

=== Tryouts ===
Shortly after the 100th performance of Believe Me, Xantippe!, William A. Brady was said to have purchased an interest in the play. By July 1913 it was reported that William A. Brady, the Shuberts, and John Craig shared ownership of the production.

The retitled Believe Me, Xantippe had a two-night tryout at the Savoy Theatre (Note: In 1913, this was at the intersection of Main Street and Mattison Avenue in Asbury Park.) in Asbury Park, New Jersey starting August 13, 1913. It then went to the Broadway Theatre in Long Branch, New Jersey for the nights of August 15–16, 1913.

=== Broadway premiere and reception ===
The production had its Broadway premiere at the 39th Street Theatre on August 19, 1913. The critic for The Sun dismissed the play as amateurish but said the actors did well with the material they were given. The Daily Standard Union reviewer said that though short, the farce was entertaining, while John Barrymore was funny and "his flippant humor was delightful". The reviewer for the New-York Tribune was uniformly positive about all elements of the production, and advised readers to tell their friends and see it a second time.

The New York Times critic called Believe Me, Xantippe a breezy and refreshing farce, noted its brevity and inconsequence, but thought it good entertainment. Charles Darnton at The Evening World also thought the play a "farce of the lightest, most inconsequential and improbable sort", complimented John Barrymore's adroit acting and speculated the whole thing would not work so well without him.

=== Change of venue and closing ===
On October 4, 1913, Believe Me, Xantippe closed at the 39th Street Theatre, and reopened October 6, 1913 at the Comedy Theatre, to make way for a new play At Bay. The production closed at the Comedy Theatre on October 25, 1913, and was immediately sent out on tour.

== Adaptations ==
=== Film ===
- Believe Me, Xantippe (1918 film) - This started production in March 1918 and was being shown in cinemas by mid-May 1918.

== Bibliography ==
- Ballard, Frederick. Believe Me, Xantippe: A Comedy in Four Acts. Samuel French, 1918.
