= Jocelyn Lee Hardy =

British military officer and POW (1894–1958)

- Born: 10 June 1894; Kensington, London, England
- Died: 30 May 1958 (aged 63); Hammersmith, London, England
- Military career
- Allegiance: United Kingdom
- Units: Connaught Rangers; Royal Inniskilling Fusiliers; Auxiliary Division, Royal Irish Constabulary (attached from military intelligence); Home Guard
- Conflicts: World War I Irish War of Independence; World War II
- Awards: Distinguished Service Order; Military Cross and Bar; Mention in Dispatches
- Other work: Author

Major Jocelyn Lee "Hoppy" Hardy DSO, MC with Bar, (10 June 1894 – 30 May 1958) was a British Army officer famed in Britain for his courage on the battlefield and repeated escapes from German prisoner of war camps during the First World War. Between 1920 and 1922 he served in Dublin as part of the British counter-insurgency against republican forces during the Irish War of Independence and is considered one of the most ruthless and effective British intelligence officers combating the IRA who subsequently accused him of brutality. He retired from the army to become a successful writer. His nickname, "Hoppy", stemmed from the loss of a leg in combat during the final months of World War One. Fitted with a prosthesis, he trained himself to disguise the fact, by walking at a very quick pace, almost completely disguising that he had a wooden leg.

== Early life ==
Jocelyn Lee Hardy was born 10 June 1894 in Kensington, London to Howard and Katherine Hardy. His father was a wool merchant from County Down. Jocelyn Hardy later joined the Connaught Rangers, gaining his commission and joining the 2nd battalion at Aldershot in January 1914.

== First World War ==
=== Capture ===
Hardy first saw action on 24 August 1914 when his unit served as a rearguard to cover the retirement of the 5th Infantry Brigade in action at Le Grand Fayt, France. By 26 August, Hardy and a group of 19 men led by a Captain Roche found themselves cut off and took shelter in a house being used as a makeshift hospital in the village of Maroilles. During the night, a large force of Germans entered the town, and the next day Hardy's group were discovered and taken prisoner, among 286 men listed as missing in the action.

=== Prisoner of war ===
On 21 September 1914, Hardy was promoted to lieutenant whilst a prisoner of war. He made twelve escape attempts from POW camps succeeding in escaping on five occasions.

In early 1915, he attempted to escape from Halle Camp, near Leipzig, by breaking through a brick wall into an adjacent ammunition factory. After five months' work, the project proved impracticable.

In the summer of 1915, he was transferred to Augustabad Camp, near Neu Brandenburg, and 10 days later managed to slip away from a bathing party outside the camp, together with a Russian officer. In what was a difficult journey, they covered the 50 miles (80 km) to the Baltic coast. They swam a river, were nearly recaptured once, but eventually reached Stralsund. Once there, they nearly managed to get the crew of a Swedish schooner to give them passage, but were arrested at the last moment.

Hardy was returned to Halle, and joined an unsuccessful attempt with a group of Russian officers to break down a wall.

He then made a solo escape attempt by picking locks and breaking through a skylight before sliding down a rope onto the street. From here he slipped into the rain and darkness. He spoke enough German to make his way by train to Bremen. Here, broken down by cold and hunger, he was recaptured by the Germans.

He was then transferred to Magdeburg, where he escaped with a Belgian officer using "subterfuge, audacity and good fortune". They reached Berlin by train and went on to Stralsund. From there, they crossed to the island of Rugen, but were arrested before they could find a fishing boat to take them to Sweden.

His next prisoner of war camp was Fort Zorndorf (now Fort Sarbinowo, Kostrzyn nad Odrą, Poland), from where escape was virtually impossible. Nevertheless, he made several attempts, and one nearly succeeded when, with two others, he almost got out disguised as a German soldier. And on another occasion he managed to break away from his guards while being marched to the kommandatura, and got as far as the train before being recaptured.

On 1 January 1917, Hardy was promoted to the rank of captain. He spent another nine months in this camp, before he was transferred to Schweidnitz (Świdnica) in Silesia. Within a short period of his arrival, he broke out with Captain Willie Loder-Symonds, Wiltshire Regiment. Carrying forged police passes, they climbed a wire fence, scaled a glass topped wall, and caught a train. They were able to travel across Germany via Dresden, Leipzig, Cologne and Aachen. Then by tram to Richterich, and reached the safety of the Netherlands within 2 days of getting out of Schweidnitz. A fellow prisoner wrote of this escape:

Hardy, had, together with another officer, just escaped over the frontier. They were in a camp in Silicia, [sic] and had travelled over five hundred miles through Germany. After escaping, in some civilian clothes, which they had managed to get into the camp, they walked to a nearby railway station, and Hardy, having learned to speak German fluently since his captivity, bought a ticket at the railway station for Berlin. The first part of their journey was uneventful, but after leaving Berlin, they were asked for their passports, and Hardy, who had helped us to make the passports at Fort Zorndorf, and had made for himself and his comrade passports, had an anxious moment while the official was examining it. But after turning the passport over several times, the official was satisfied, and gave it back, and they were safe again for the time being. A little later, however, Hardy's comrade was taken very ill, no doubt from the effects of his long imprisonment, and for some time it looked as if the people in the carriage would notice something wrong, as unfortunately he could not speak any German. At several other places along the line they had to leave the carriage, and in some cases had to change trains to get away from one or other who had become too inquisitive. In the end they arrived at Aachen, when again their passport was examined, and as before, the officials were evidently satisfied that it was bona fide, and let them pass. After leaving the station at Aachen, they boldly walked through the town, and hiding themselves in a forest near the frontier, they managed to crawl into Holland during the night. Nobody was more pleased than myself to hear of Hardy's escape, as he had made many attempts, and certainly deserved to succeed.

On 5 March 1918, Hardy boarded at boat at Rotterdam after 3 1/2 years as a prisoner of war. The boat sailed a week later and Hardy returned to England, where he was received by King George V at Buckingham Palace on 18 March. Captain Loder-Symonds of the Wiltshire Regiment was killed in a flying accident a short time later as he joined the RFC on his return to England.

=== Later war service ===
In April 1918, Hardy transferred to the 2nd Battalion Inniskilling Fusiliers. On 1 August 1918, he was awarded the Military Cross on the Ypres front for leading a fighting patrol which engaged a group of enemy soldiers, killing one and causing the rest to flee. Hardy then used rapid fire to silence one of two German machine guns firing on the patrol before he was wounded by a grenade. Hardy ordered the rest of the patrol to retreat back to their lines whilst he remained to drag his badly wounded sergeant back 200 yards (180 m) to safety. The wording for his decoration declared, "Throughout the operation he set a splendid example to his men, and also obtained valuable information as to the enemy's dispositions".

On 2 October 1918, Hardy led a counter-attack near Dadizeele, during which he was shot in the stomach and received such severe wounds to his leg that it had to be amputated. He was evacuated back to England and was still in hospital when the war ended a short time later. He was fitted with an artificial limb and his resulting rapid manner of walking to disguise this earned him the nickname "Hoppy".

== Marriage ==
On 1 November 1919, Hardy married Kathleen Isabel Hutton-Potts in London. On 30 January 1920, Hardy was awarded a bar to his Military Cross, and the Distinguished Service Order "in recognition of gallant conduct and determination displayed in escaping or attempting to escape from captivity".

== Irish War of Independence ==
From April 1920, Hardy ceased to be employed by the Military Intelligence Directorate due to "ill health caused by wounds". He was posted to F Company of the Auxiliary Division, Royal Irish Constabulary (ADRIC), seconded as an intelligence officer based at Dublin Castle, retaining his Connaught Rangers uniform. He later stated that he worked for Scotland Yard, which was the recruiting centre for ADRIC and to whom the information he gathered was relayed for analysis. Despite his wounds, Hardy was to lead raids on various IRA locations, including Vaughn's Hotel in what is now known as Parnell Square. His main role, however, was interrogating prisoners in Dublin Castle who had been captured with weapons or seditious documents of any importance. Hardy had experienced several such interrogations himself as an escaped prisoner of war and he was often aided by his colleague, Captain William Lorraine King, MC. On 10 June 1920, Hardy was awarded a mention in dispatches.

Hardy became a hated figure for the IRA, who accused him of brutality in interrogating prisoners, such as tricking suspects into providing information by using a revolver loaded with blanks to stage fake executions or threatening to burn them with a hot poker. The IRA dubbed the cells "The Knocking Shop".

In August 2014, TV personality Brendan O'Carroll featured on BBC TV's Who Do You Think You Are investigating the death of his grandfather, Peter O'Carroll, during the Irish War of Independence. On 16 October 1920, O'Carroll was shot dead at his home in Manor Street, Dublin. The programme uncovered a written testimonial by IRA mole David Neligan in the 1950s stating that IRA spymaster Michael Collins had suspected Hardy was responsible for an almost identical shooting of another Republican, Limerick County Councillor John Lynch in the Exchange Hotel, Dublin. However Neligan had informed Collins that Lynch had actually been killed by Captain G.T. Baggallay after Lynch drew a revolver on him during a raid. Baggallay, who like Hardy had lost a leg in combat, would later be killed on 'Bloody Sunday'. While the BBC programme claimed that Peter O'Carroll was not active in the rebellion, a statement made by Liam O'Carroll (one of Peter's sons and an uncle of Brendan O'Carroll) states that Peter O'Carroll was indeed a member of the Irish Republican Brotherhood and was involved in arming the rebels.

David Neligan's testimonial is dated 4 May 1950, 30 years after Peter O'Carroll's death. It states that his knowledge that Hardy figured in O'Carroll's murder was based on a description given to members of the Irish Volunteers by O'Carroll family members. However, a newspaper account in the Irish Independent dated 18 October 1920 reported that the deceased's daughter Martha said that her mother, on hearing knocking at the door, opened an upstairs window and saw the forms of two or three men at the door. Martha stated that the night was "densely" dark. It appears from this account that no one else claimed to have seen the murderers and it is unlikely that Mrs O'Carroll could have given a description of any of the men, given that it was very dark at the time and she would have had to have leant out the window to see those at the door. There is no indication that she saw any of the men moving such as would indicate that she might have noticed Hardy's gait. This newspaper account also states that the investigating police took possession of a piece of paper stating "A Traitor to Ireland: Shot by I.R.A." which had been pinned to the deceased's back. The only suggested similarity between this murder and Mr Lynch's death is that there was apparently little or no sound from the gun. There is therefore no conclusive evidence that Hardy was involved in the killing of Peter O'Carroll. Yet due to his methodology it is widely believed that this sadistic officer was the killer, he never caught the O'Carroll sons who went to continue the fight for Irish freedom.

On one occasion, Hardy was shadowed on a visit to England, but evaded his would-be assassin at Euston station by quickly transferring from his train to a waiting taxi before he could be ambushed. On another occasion, a group of assassins was waiting for him on the dockside on his return to Ireland, but aborted their attempt when an armoured car arrived to pick him up. Hardy was on a list of intelligence agents to be assassinated in the morning hours of 21 November 1920. The IRA's attempt to destroy British intelligence in Ireland resulting in 13 deaths. This would come to be known as "Bloody Sunday". Hardy escaped death because he was not at his residence when the would-be assassins arrived. The previous evening, Hardy had taken part in a series of raids that led to the capture of prominent republicans Dick McKee and Peadar Clancy, who had done much of the planning around "Bloody Sunday". Hardy later prevented Clancy from escaping by slipping into a group of prisoners being transferred out of Dublin Castle and both prisoners were later killed in disputed circumstances by the auxiliaries guarding them. Between 13 and 15 February 1921, Captain William L King would be tried by court-martial and cleared of the allegation of the extrajudicial killing of two other IRA members in what would become known as the "Drumcondra Affair". Dublin Castle's Under Secretary Sir Alfred Cope later speculated that Hardy may have influenced other witnesses in the inquiry.

== Author ==
In November 1922, Hardy was placed on the army half-pay list. In April 1925, he retired from the army on account of ill-health caused by his wounds. He worked for Lloyds Bank in Pall Mall, London and later went into full-time book writing and farming at Washpit Farm near King's Lynn, Norfolk. His publications were often based on his own true-life adventures and included:

- I Escape!, 1927; the true story of Hardy's numerous escapes from German prisoner of war camps during the First World War, with a foreword by Sir Arthur Conan Doyle.
- Everything is Thunder; the story of an escaped POW aided by a German woman to return to allied lines.
- The Key, a play written with Robert Gore-Browne set against the background of Hardy's own experiences with the Auxiliary Division of the RIC during the counter-insurgency in Ireland.
- Never in Vain, 1936
- Recoil, 1936; the story of an officer in the Abwehr trying to quell a communist uprising in Africa
- The Stroke of Eight, 1938
- Pawn in the Game, 1939

== Films ==
Two of his works were made into films. One of these was The Key, dealing with a love triangle between military officers during the Irish conflict. As a play, it opened at the St Martin's Theatre, London on 6 September 1933, and a film version was made in 1934. It would be re-released in the U.S. in 1960 as High Peril.

Everything is Thunder (1936) was about an amorous POW officer's romance with a German woman, and her helping him return to allied lines. It received favourable reviews and well received in Germany at a time when rapprochement was still acceptable in the UK. The film was withdrawn from circulation at the onset of the Second World War.

== Fascism ==
In the 1930s, Hardy became a supporter of Oswald Mosley's British Union of Fascists (BUF), as did Sir Ormonde Winter, the head of British Intelligence in Dublin Castle, possibly as an agent provocateur. In March 1934, he addressed the King's Lynn BUF, recounting his wartime experiences. In 1937 he embarked on a world trip on the liner SS Rawalpindi with his wife Kathleen Hardy, ostensibly as a holiday but including visits to the strategic Japanese ports of Kobe and Yokohama on the eve of the Second World War.

== World War II ==
During World War 2 Hardy joined the Home Guard and became involved in Auxiliary Units, stay behind groups which would wage guerrilla warfare against the Germans in the event of an invasion of Britain, acting as military liaison for the Narford Auxiliary Unit Patrol. As the threat of invasion faded Hardy took command of an anti-aircraft battery, one of 127,000 Home Guardsmen who would combat the Baby Blitz of 1943 and the V1 strikes which followed in the summer of 1944.

== Later life ==
In addition to his literary work, Hardy established a reputation as a polo player and a Rolls-Royce enthusiast. He frequently attended Connaught Ranger reunion dinners. He lived in Kensington, London in the 1950s.

== Death ==
Hardy died of natural causes on 30 May 1958 in Hammersmith, London. He was buried on 5 June at Wells Church, Norfolk leaving an estate of £57,000, on which £19,000 death duty taxes were paid. In his obituary Hardy is referred to as 'not only a gallant soldier: he was a rare bird, a writer of good and simple prose. A pity he did not write more. But, above all, Hardy was a man'. In the foreword for Hardy's autobiography I Escape!, Conan Doyle pays tribute to Hardy, stating that a "more gallant gentleman never lived."

== Sources ==
- The Squad, Dwyer, T. Ryle, Mercier Press, Cork, 2005, ISBN 1-85635-469-5
- The Secret Societies of Ireland, Pollard H.B.C.
- On Another Man's Wound, O'Malley Ernie
- Royal Irish Constabulary Officers: A Biographical and Genealogical Guide, 1816–1922, Herlihy
- Michael Collins, Taylor, Rex
- My Fight For Irish Freedom, Breen, Dan
- Sword and Sturrups, de Montmorency Hervey
- Sword for Hire, Duff Douglas Victor
- Ireland for Ever, Crozier, Frank P.
- Diary of Pte.JJP Swindlehurst, (Imperial War Museum)
- The War Behind the Wire, John Lewis-Stempel ISBN 0297608088
