= Ladies of the Jury =

1932 film

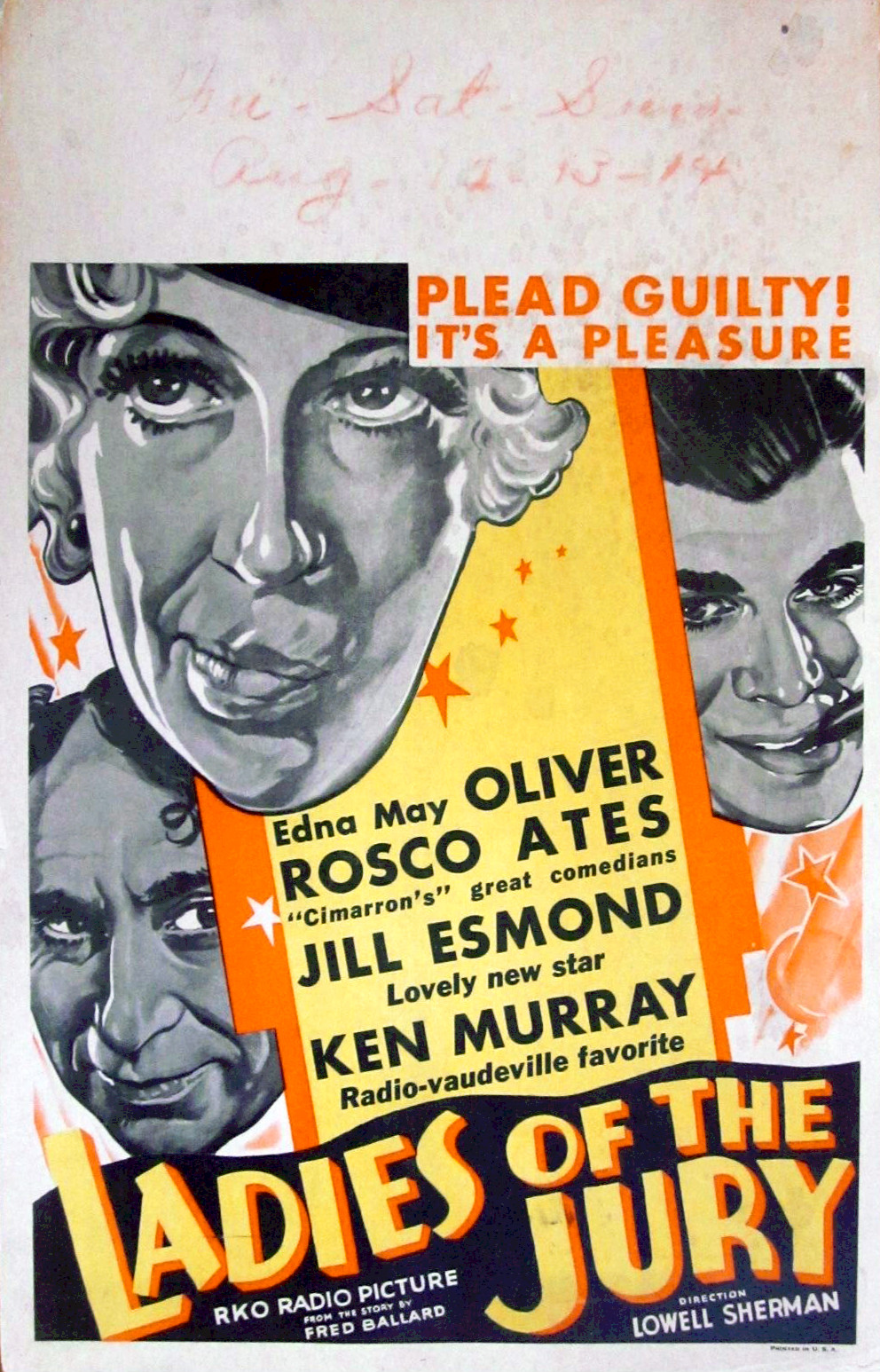
- Theatrical release poster
- Directed by: Lowell Sherman
- Screenplay by: Marion Dix; Edward Salisbury Field; Eddie Welch
- Based on: Ladies of the Jury; 1929 play by John Frederick Ballard
- Produced by: William LeBaron
- Starring: Edna May Oliver; Jill Esmond; Ken Murray; Roscoe Ates; Kitty Kelly
- Cinematography: Jack MacKenzie
- Edited by: Charles L. Kimball
- Music by: Max Steiner
- Production company: RKO Pictures
- Distributed by: RKO Pictures
- Release date: February 5, 1932
- Running time: 63 minutes
- Country: United States
- Language: English

Ladies of the Jury is a 1932 American pre-Code comedy film directed by Lowell Sherman and written by Marion Dix, Edward Salisbury Field and Eddie Welch based on the 1929 play of the same name by John Frederick Ballard. The film stars Edna May Oliver, Jill Esmond, Ken Murray, Roscoe Ates and Kitty Kelly. It was released on February 5, 1932 by RKO Pictures.

== Plot ==
Middle-aged Mrs. Livingston Baldwin Crane is selected to serve on a jury for the murder trial of French ex-showgirl Yvette Gordon, who is accused of killing her rich, much older husband. The prosecutor calls only two witnesses, a doctor and Mrs. Gordon's maid, Evelyn Snow. Snow testifies that after she found Mrs. Gordon kneeling beside the body of her husband holding the gun, her employer offered to pay her to attest that Mr. Gordon committed suicide. Mrs. Gordon claims that Snow had demanded money to tell the police that story. On the witness stand, Mrs. Gordon claims that she had gone away for a week but returned to her angry, suspicious husband who threatened her with a gun. She states that they struggled and the gun fired accidentally. During the testimony, Mrs. Crane asks several questions of the witnesses, which annoys judge Henry Fish. She discovers that Snow was recommended to Mrs. Gordon by Chauncey Gordon, Mr. Crane's nephew, sole relative and heir.

When the jury retires to consider a verdict, Mrs. Crane casts the sole not guilty vote. When asked why, she replies, "Woman's intuition." After much deliberation, the count is ten to two in favor of acquittal. During the deliberations, Mrs. Crane illegally passes a note to her maid Suzanne instructing her to hire a detective agency to investigate further.

When Mrs. Crane overhears jurors debating whether to switch their votes back to guilty, she recommends that they reenact the death scene. In the Gordon mansion, Chauncey Gordon refuses to pay Snow any more money until after Mrs. Gordon is found guilty. When they see the jury approaching, Snow hides Chauncey in a secret compartment. However, the jurors find him in the secret compartment by chance. A telegram arrives stating that the detective agency has discovered that Chauncey paid Snow $10,000. As a result, the jury finds Mrs. Gordon not guilty.

== Cast ==
- Edna May Oliver as Mrs. Livingston Baldwin Crane
- Jill Esmond as Mrs. Yvette Gordon
- Ken Murray as Spencer B. Dazy
- Roscoe Ates as Andrew MacKaig
- Kitty Kelly as Mayme Mixter
- Cora Witherspoon as Lily Pratt
- Robert McWade as Judge Henry Fish
- Helene Millard as Miss Evelyn Elaine Snow
- Kate Price as Mrs. McGuire
- Guinn "Big Boy" Williams as Steve Bromm (uncredited)

== Reception ==
In a contemporary review for The New York Times, critic Mordaunt Hall praised Edna May Oliver's "most amusing performance" and stated that "she is a clever enough player to deserve even a better story. But this film has a number of really funny lines and creditable portrayals are given by those in the supporting cast."

TV Guide called the film an "innocuous courtroom drama" and noted that "Oliver is hilarious."

== Remake ==
The film was remade as We're on the Jury in 1937.

== See also ==
- 12 Angry Men, a 1957 film also concerning a jury deliberation
