= Betty Boyd =

American actress

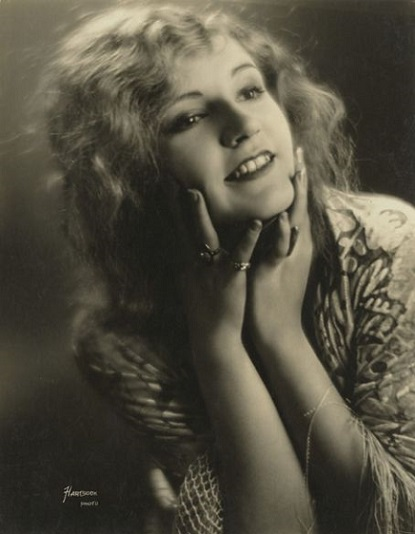
- Boyd in 1928
- Born: Elizabeth Boyd Smith; May 11, 1908; Kansas City, Missouri, U.S.
- Died: September 16, 1971 (aged 63); Los Angeles, California, U.S.
- Occupation: Actress
- Years active: 1927–1949
- Spouse: Charles H. Over Jr. (div. 1934)

Elizabeth Boyd (May 11, 1908 – September 16, 1971) was an American film actress in the early days of Hollywood, mostly in the silent film era of the late 1920s and into the early 1930s in B-movies.

== Career ==
Born Elizabeth Boyd Smith in Kansas City, Missouri, Boyd moved to Hollywood in the mid-1920s to pursue an acting career. Her first film role, which was uncredited, was in the 1927 film The Show, which starred John Gilbert and Lionel Barrymore, grand uncle to actress Drew Barrymore. Boyd's first credited role was that same year in Off Again. In 1929 Boyd starred in three films, and had an uncredited role in a fourth, as well as being named as one of thirteen WAMPAS Baby Stars in the company of actresses Josephine Dunn, Sally Blane, and future Hollywood star Jean Arthur.

1930 was by far the biggest year of Boyd's career. That year she starred in eight films, all credited, and had made a successful transition to "talking films". In 1931 she starred in only two films, Ex-Sweeties and Maid To Order, and, in 1932, she again had only two films, a supporting role in An Old Gypsie Custom, and an uncredited role in A Modern Hero. By the next year her career was all but over. She had only two film acting roles afterward, both in the late 1940s. Her last role was in 1949 when she had an uncredited role in Samson and Delilah.

== Later years and death ==
Boyd retired, but did not leave the Los Angeles area. She was married to Charles H. Over Jr., but that ended in divorce in 1934. She died on September 16, 1971, in Los Angeles, aged 63, from undisclosed causes.

== Selected filmography ==
- The Show (1927)
- Light of India (1929)
- Under a Texas Moon (1930)
- Along Came Youth (1930)
- Lilies of the Field (1930), as Ayah.
- Paradise Island (1930)
- Gun Law (1933)
- A Modern Hero (1934)
- Fallen Angel (1945)
- Samson and Delilah (1949)
