= Sing and Like It =

1934 film directed by William A. Seiter

- Directed by: William A. Seiter
- Screenplay by: Marion Dix; Laird Doyle
- Based on: "So, You Won't Sing, Eh?" unpublished short story by Aben Kandel
- Produced by: Merian C. Cooper; Howard J. Green (associate)
- Starring: ZaSu Pitts; Pert Kelton; Edward Everett Horton
- Cinematography: Nicholas Musuraca
- Edited by: George Crone
- Music by: Max Steiner
- Production company: RKO Radio Pictures
- Distributed by: RKO Radio Pictures, Inc.
- Release date: April 20, 1934
- Running time: 72 minutes
- Country: United States
- Language: English

Sing and Like It is a 1934 American pre-Code comedy film directed by William A. Seiter from a screenplay by Marion Dix and Laird Doyle, based on the unpublished short story "So You Won't Sing, Eh?" by Aben Kandel. The film stars ZaSu Pitts, Pert Kelton and Edward Everett Horton.

== Cast ==
- ZaSu Pitts as Anne Snodgrass
- Pert Kelton as Ruby
- Edward Everett Horton as Adam Frick
- Nat Pendleton as T. Fenny Sylvester
- Ned Sparks as Toots McGuire
- John Qualen as Oswald
- Matt McHugh as Junker
- Stanley Fields as Butch
- William H. Griffith as Webster
- Roy D'Arcy as Mr. Gregory
- Joseph Sauers as Gunner
