= Three Who Paid =

1923 film by Colin Campbell

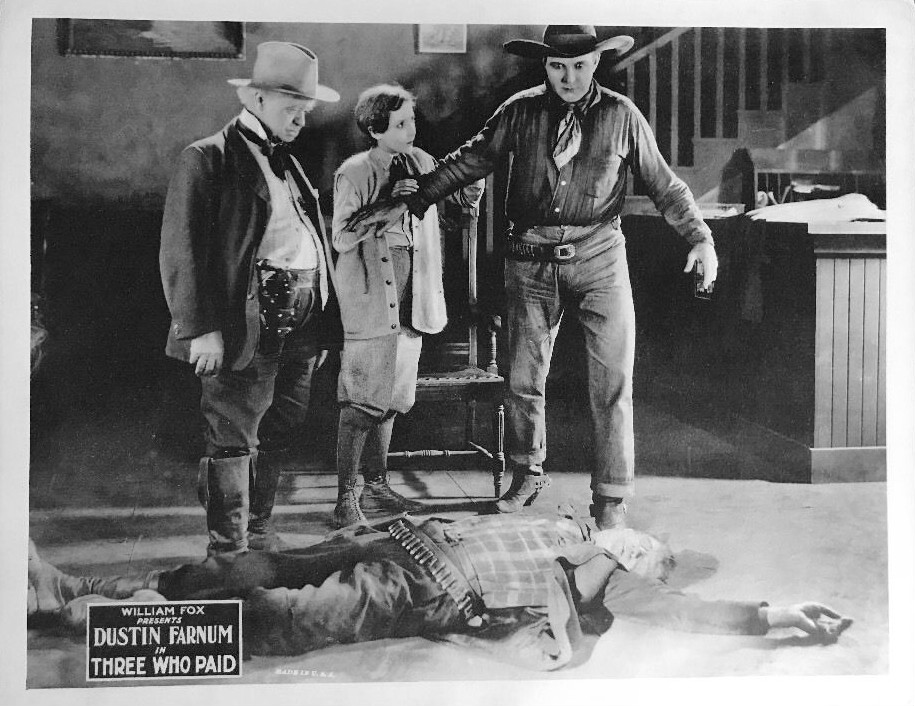
- Lobby card
- Directed by: Colin Campbell; William A. Wellman (assistant director)
- Screenplay by: Joseph F. Poland
- Based on: The Range-Land Avenger (short story) by George Owen Baxter (Note: The short story was originally published as "Three Who Paid" in the April 8, 1922 issue of Western Story Magazine, and later published as "The Range-Land Avenger".)
- Starring: Dustin Farnum; Bessie Love; Frank Campeau
- Cinematography: Don Short
- Production company: Fox Film
- Distributed by: Fox Film
- Release date: January 7, 1923 (U.S.)
- Running time: 5 reels
- Country: United States
- Language: Silent (English intertitles)

Three Who Paid is a lost 1923 American silent Western film directed by Colin Campbell, and starring Dustin Farnum, with Bessie Love and Frank Campeau. The film was based on the 1922 short story by George Owen Baxter, and was produced and distributed through Fox Film.

== Plot ==
Riley Sinclair seeks to avenge the death of his brother, whose three companions – Quade, Sanderson, and Lowrie – left him to die in the desert. Two of the three men die, and the third is spared so that he can confess to the crime. Sinclair helps John Caspar, a schoolteacher, who is actually a rich young woman who is trying to get away from her opportunist husband. When her identity is revealed, she and Sinclair fall in love.

== Cast ==
- Dustin Farnum as Riley Sinclair
- Bessie Love as Virginia Cartright/John Caspar
- Fred Kohler as Jim Quade
- Frank Campeau as Ed Sanderson
- Robert Daly as Sam Lowrie
- William Conklin as Jude Cartright
- Robert Agnew as Hal Sinclair

== Production ==
In November 1922, scenes were filmed in San Juan Canyon in Orange County, California. Production was delayed when Bessie Love, who was responsible for her own wardrobe, forgot to bring spirit gum to hold her wig, the prop man gave her LePage's glue, which adhered the wig to her head.

== Release and reception ==
The film was "a first rate production", but had issues. For the parts of the film when her character is masquerading as a man, Bessie Love was deemed unconvincing. Overall, the film received mixed reviews.

On its release, some theaters showed the film with the Baby Peggy short Nobody's Darling.

== Preservation ==
With no holdings located in archives, Three Who Paid is considered a lost film.
