= The Worst Woman in Paris? =

1933 film by Monta Bell

- Theatrical release poster
- Directed by: Monta Bell
- Screenplay by: Monta Bell; Marion Dix
- Produced by: Monta Bell; Jesse L. Lasky
- Starring: Benita Hume; Adolphe Menjou; Harvey Stephens; Helen Chandler; Margaret Seddon; Adele St. Mauer
- Cinematography: Hal Mohr
- Production company: Fox Film Corporation
- Distributed by: Fox Film Corporation
- Release date: October 20, 1933
- Running time: 76 minutes
- Country: United States
- Language: English

The Worst Woman in Paris? is a 1933 American drama film directed by Monta Bell and written by Monta Bell and Marion Dix. The film stars Benita Hume, Adolphe Menjou, Harvey Stephens, Helen Chandler, Margaret Seddon and Adele St. Mauer. The film was released on October 20, 1933, by Fox Film Corporation.

== Plot ==
Delightful Englishwoman Peggy Vane tires of being meddled about in Paris, where busybodies have marked her "the most noticeably terrible lady in Paris" on account of her various admirers. Her steady friend is the well off and tainted Adolphe Ballou, who is known as "the best-dressed man in Paris." The two sophisticates become tired of their day by day schedule and expect that they are exhausted with one another. They consent to go separate ways, and after Adolphe guarantees her that he will consistently remain by her on the off chance that she needs him, Peggy goes to America with her servant Jeanine.In Bridgetown, Kansas, the train Peggy and Jeanine are on is involved in a wreck, and inspired by the courage of John Strong as he rescues trapped passengers, Peggy saves a baby and is injured in the process. While Bridgetown residents are acclaiming her bravery, Peggy convalesces in the home of John and his mom, who are the sort of straightforward individuals Peggy once appreciated however now views as interesting. As the days pass, Peggy loses her veneer of over-sophistication and grows to respect Mrs. Strong and John, who is the headmaster of a boys school. In spite of the fact that John is ignorant concerning it, Peggy sees that his dedicated secretary, Mary Dunbar, is infatuated with him. John is awestruck by Peggy's excitement, nonetheless, and his sweet considerations start to wear out her obstruction. She urges him to acknowledge the work of leader of the state college, which he had proposed to turn down in spite of Mary's demand that he could deal with the work. Accepting that moving to a greater city will captivate Peggy to remain with him, he acknowledges the position and fantasies about wedding her. Peggy has comparative dreams yet before long understands that her standing will destroy John's vocation. The night after Peggy decides to leave, Jeanine shows her a Paris paper article about Adolphe, who has lost his fortune and is presently a representative in the organization he once possessed. At the point when John requests that she wed him, Peggy reveals to him that she can't on the grounds that she should get back to the one who gave her beginning and end. John is squashed by Peggy's affectation of chilliness and goes to the school, where he discloses to Mary that he won't be taking the college work. Really focusing just on John's government assistance, Mary asks Peggy to help him, and Peggy, intrigued by the profundity of Mary's adoration, goes to see John. She confesses that she loves him and asks him to make their goodbye something wonderful. The next morning, Mrs. Strong tells Mary that she is worried about John, for he did not come home the night before, and about Peggy, who did not return until very late. The mayor arrives to thank Peggy for rescuing the child, after which Peggy bids a bittersweet farewell to Mrs. Strong and Mary and returns to Paris. There she finds Adolphe and gives him her jewels to pay off his debts. Realizing that they belong together, the couple are married and learn to ignore the gossips who insist that Peggy only returned to Adolphe to help him spend his regained fortune.

== Cast ==
- Benita Hume as Margaret Ann 'Peggy' Vane
- Adolphe Menjou as Adolphe Ballou
- Harvey Stephens as John Strong
- Helen Chandler as Mary Dunbar
- Margaret Seddon as Mrs. John Strong
- Adele St. Mauer as Jeanine
- Leonard Carey as Chumley - the Butler
- Maidel Turner as Mrs. Leda Jensen
- George Irving as Doctor
- John Irwin as Mushy
- Theresa Harris as Lily
- Edgar Norton as Valet
- John Trent as Suave Man
