= The Key (1934 film) =

1934 American film by Michael Curtiz

- Poster of The Key film
- Directed by: Michael Curtiz
- Screenplay by: Laird Doyle
- Based on: The Key; 1933 play by R. Gore Brown; Jocelyn Lee Hardy
- Produced by: Robert R. Presnell Sr.
- Starring: William Powell; Edna Best
- Cinematography: Ernest Haller
- Edited by: Thomas Richards
- Music by: Allie Wrubel (composer); Mort Dixon (composer)
- Distributed by: Warner Bros. Pictures
- Release date: June 9, 1934 (U.S.)
- Running time: 71 minutes
- Country: United States
- Language: English

The Key is a 1934 American Pre-Code drama film directed by Michael Curtiz. It was re-issued as High Peril (pre-release title Sue of Fury) in 1960.

The story, concerning a love triangle, is set during the Irish War of Independence.

== Plot ==
Captain Bill Tennant is a British officer stationed in Dublin in 1920. Tennant had a month long tryst with Norah, the wife of his friend, British intelligence officer Captain Andrew Kerr, three years ago before Norah and Andy met.

Tennant's first assignment is to capture a notorious Sinn Féin member, Peadar Conlan. His first attempt is a failure, and Kerr is ordered to relieve Tennant overnight. Norah is frightened by his assignment and begs her husband not to go. After Kerr leaves, we see a flashback to when Tennant and Norah were involved, several years before.

Kerr leads the search for Conlan. He finds and captures him. When he arrives home, very late, Norah is still up and still dressed. Tennant is also there and insists “We've got to tell him.” Norah says that is for her to do, sends Tennant away. and tells her husband “Yes.” She reminds her husband that he has always known that there had been someone else. That someone was Tennant, and the passion she thought long past has flared up at this meeting. Kerr rushes out, despite her pleadings that he'll be killed; he says that might solve both their problems. Tennant sees him leave and intercepts a distraught Norah to ask where Kerr is headed; Bill promises to find him.

Conlan is sentenced to hang by the British military. Shortly after, Kerr is spotted and followed to a pub where he is ambushed and abducted by men and women waiting in the alley. When Tennant arrives at the military post the next morning, he finds Norah waiting there for news of her husband. She tells him that a part of her went out the door with Kerr. Her love for Tennant was a romantic dream: He's "just three years too late.”

A messenger arrives from Sinn Féin. He claims to be a peacemaker, and tells the general that Kerr will be released if Conlan is. But the general tells him Conlan will be hanged at 6:00 a.m. the next morning. Norah begs the general to comply, but the general refuses.

Tennant follows the Sinn Féin representative and tries to bargain for Kerr's life, but is told nothing will do except the release of Conlan. He returns to HQ and, against orders, goes into the general's office, breaks into his desk, and forges a release for Conlan. At 3 am, outside the prison, a crowd of people are on their knees praying. Kerr's captors set him free. The next morning, the town celebrates Conlan's release and the British mount a manhunt for Conlan. Tennant's forgery is discovered, and Kerr is distressed to find his friend has committed career suicide to free him. Outside HQ, Tennant tells Kerr that Norah has been in love with a glamorous memory but that seeing Tennant again killed all the romance for her and caused her to realize she really loves her husband. Tennant presents himself to the general, knowing that he will serve at least three years in jail. Under arrest, Tennant is driven away through the cheering crowds while the Kerrs look on.

== Cast ==
- William Powell as Capt. Bill Tennant
- Edna Best as Norah Kerr
- Colin Clive as Capt. Andrew Kerr
- Hobart Cavanaugh as Homer, Tennant's aide
- Halliwell Hobbes as General C.O. Furlong
- Donald Crisp as Peadar Conlan
- J.M. Kerrigan as O'Duffy
- Henry O'Neill as Dan
- Phil Regan as Irishman killed by Capt. Kerr
- Arthur Treacher as Lt. Merriman, Furlong's aide
- Maxine Doyle as Pauline O'Connor
- Arthur Aylesworth as Kirby
- Gertrude Short as Evie, a barmaid
- Anne Shirley as Flower Girl (as Dawn O'Day)

== Background ==
One of the writers of the film script was Captain Jocelyn Lee Hardy, a decorated veteran of World War I who had made repeated escapes from German prisoner of war camps. After the Great War Hardy served as a military intelligence officer attached to the Auxiliary Division of the Royal Irish Constabulary during the Irish War of Independence. He specialised in interrogating IRA prisoners and survived several attempts on his life by the Irish Republican Army.
