= Young America (1932 film) =

1932 film by Frank Borzage

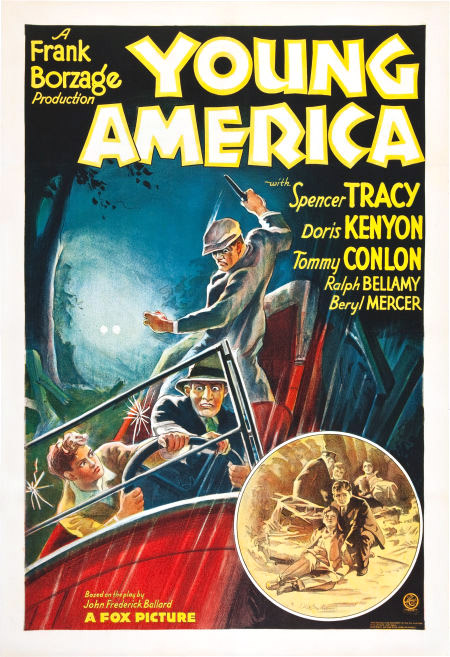
- Theatrical release poster
- Directed by: Frank Borzage
- Written by: John Frederick Ballard (play); Story: Maurine Watkins; William M. Conselman (screenplay)
- Produced by: William Fox
- Starring: Spencer Tracy; Doris Kenyon
- Distributed by: Fox Film Corporation
- Release date: April 17, 1932
- Running time: 70 minutes
- Country: United States
- Language: English

Young America is a 1932 American Pre-Code drama film about two juvenile delinquents, Arthur and Nutty, directed by Frank Borzage and starring Spencer Tracy and Doris Kenyon. It was first adapted for the screen by Maurine Watkins from the play by Fred Ballard. William M. Conselman rewrote the screenplay, and Maurine Watkins's name no longer appeared on the credits (per the American Film Institute catalog). Raymond Borzage plays Edward "Nutty" Beamish.

== Plot ==
Delinquents Arthur and his friend Nutty rob a drugstore in an attempt to obtain medicine for Nutty's grandmother. The druggist's wife, Mrs. Doray, asks for custody. Overhearing the argument between the couple, Arthur runs away. When he returns, Mr. Doray is being held up by bandits at the drugstore.

== Cast ==
- Spencer Tracy as Jack Doray
- Doris Kenyon as Edith Doray
- Ralph Bellamy as Judge Blake
- Tommy Conlon as Arthur Simpson (as Tom Conlon)
- Raymond Borzage as Edward 'Nutty' Beamish
- Beryl Mercer as Grandma Beamish
- Sarah Padden as Mrs. Mary Taylor
- Robert Homans as Patrolman Weems
- Anne Shirley as Mabel Saunders (as Dawn O'Day)
- Louise Beavers as Maid
- Jane Darwell as Schoolteacher
- Spec O'Donnell as Bull Butler
- Lee Phelps as Court Clerk
- Eddie Sturgis as Bandit
