= Marion Dix =

American screenwriter, filmmaker, and foreign correspondent (1904–1992)

- Born: June 5, 1904; Milwaukee, Wisconsin, USA
- Died: February 7, 1992 (aged 87); San Gabriel, California, USA
- Occupations: Screenwriter, filmmaker, foreign correspondent, lecturer
- Years active: 1930–1938

Marion E. Dix (June 5, 1904 – February 7, 1992) was an American screenwriter, filmmaker, and foreign correspondent.

== Biography ==
=== Early life ===
Born to Oscar Dix and Jane Edgerton in Milwaukee, Marion Dix and her sister Ruth were raised primarily in Chicago. Marion worked her way through the University of Washington by writing for newspapers and magazines, graduating in 1925.

=== Hollywood career ===
She then moved to Hollywood with the intent of becoming a writer, and after finding work in short supply, she found employment as a stenographer at Famous Players–Lasky. She soon moved her way into a script clerk position, working with screenwriters like Jules Furthman and J. Walter Ruben, and after getting continuity credits for her work on 1930's The Kibitzer, she was moved into a scenarist role.

During the 1930s, she worked on over a dozen scripts, from 1930's The Busybody at Paramount to 1934's Hawaiian Nights at RKO. She left Hollywood in the mid-1930s to write scenarios for the British film industry, including Everything Is Thunder and It's Love Again for Gaumont.

=== Journalistic endeavors ===
After retiring from the film industry, she returned to her journalistic roots, working as a foreign correspondent, radio commentator, and lecturer. During World War II, she broadcast her own commentary over shortwave radio from Paris to America, and after escaping occupied Paris, she wrote and directed educational films for the U.S. Office of War Information.

After the war was finished, she was made chief of the film and TV section of the United Nations Department of Information in New York City. As part of that assignment, she spent five years living in China, where she produced training films for aid workers.

=== Personal life ===
She married Canadian writer-producer Haworth Bromley in Las Vegas in 1933 in a secret ceremony; the marriage ended in divorce.

== Selected filmography ==
- Land Without Music (1936)
- Everything Is Thunder (1936)
- It's Love Again (1936)
- Hawaiian Nights (1934)
- Afterwards (1934)
- Sing and Like It (1934)
- The Worst Woman in Paris? (1933)
- The Past of Mary Holmes (1933)
- Ladies of the Jury (1932)
- Along Came Youth (1930) (scenario)
- Sea Legs (1930) (scenario)
- Safety in Numbers (1930) (story)
- Men Are Like That (1930) (scenario)
- The Busybody (1930)
