= Gun Law (1933 film) =

1933 film

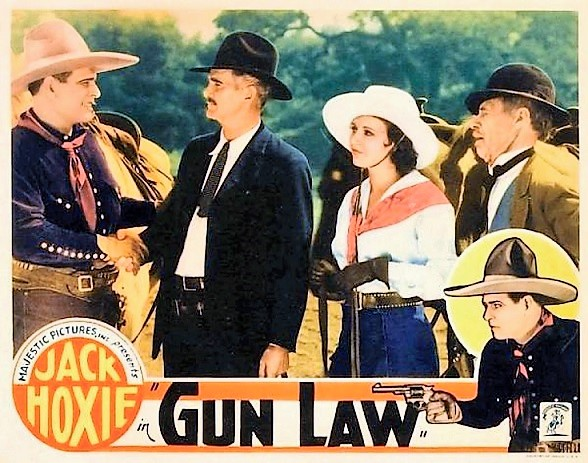
- Lobby card
- Directed by: Lewis D. Collins
- Written by: Oliver Drake
- Produced by: Henry L. Goldstone; Larry Darmour
- Starring: Jack Hoxie; Betty Boyd; Mary Carr
- Cinematography: William Nobles
- Edited by: S. Roy Luby
- Production company: Larry Darmour Productions
- Distributed by: Majestic Pictures
- Release date: April 1, 1933
- Running time: 59 minutes
- Country: United States
- Language: English

Gun Law is a 1933 American pre-Code Western film directed by Lewis D. Collins and starring Jack Hoxie, Betty Boyd and Mary Carr. It was remade in 1937 as Melody of the Plains.

== Plot ==
Sonora Kid, who is riding with his buddies Tony Andrews and Black Jack, decides to change his evil ways once Tony decides to go back to his hometown where he wants to meet his sick, blind mother. However, Sonora robs the local banker before leaving the town to help save the owner of the café from getting evicted, and this results into Tony getting injured and committing suicide instead of causing troubles to his friends.

Sonora arrives at the Andrews ranch along with Black Jack where they let Mrs. Andrews think that Sonora is her son in order to remain there until the cattle roundup ends. The ruthless Nevada and his gang members attack the ranch to steal cattle but Sonora plays a smart game by fooling Nevada and his gang about the situation. Upon hearing everything from Black Jack, U.S. Marshal Jim Hawkins helps in putting an end to the activities of the gang and killing Nevada. Sonora is then freed by the marshal because he thinks that he is no more a bad man.

== Cast ==
- Jack Hoxie as The Sonora Kid
- Betty Boyd as Nita Hammond
- Mary Carr as Mother Andrews
- Paul Fix as Tony Andrews
- Harry Todd as Blackjack
- J. Frank Glendon as Nevada Smith
- Otto Lederer as the barber
- William P. Burt as Jake Lawson - banker
- Bob Burns as Marshal Jim Hawkins
- Edmund Cobb as Tex - henchman

== Bibliography ==
- Pitts, Michael R. Poverty Row Studios, 1929–1940: An Illustrated History of 55 Independent Film Companies, with a Filmography for Each. McFarland & Company, 2005. ISBN 0786401680.
