= Everything Is Thunder =

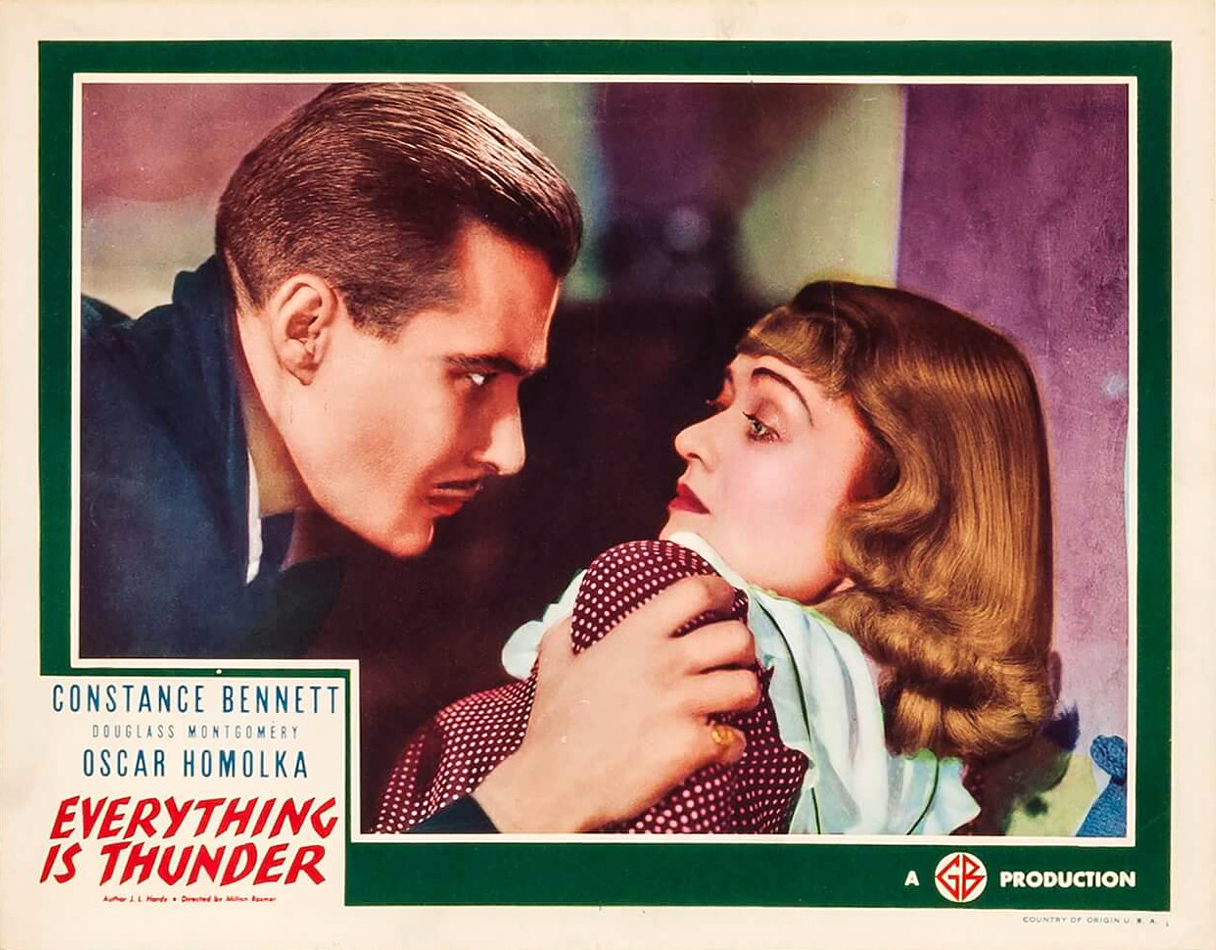
- Lobby card
- Directed by: Milton Rosmer
- Written by: Jocelyn Lee Hardy (novel); Marion Dix; J. O. C. Orton
- Produced by: S.C. Balcon
- Starring: Constance Bennett; Douglass Montgomery; Oskar Homolka; Roy Emerton
- Cinematography: Günther Krampf
- Edited by: Charles Saunders
- Music by: Louis Levy; Jack Beaver
- Production company: Gaumont British
- Distributed by: Gaumont British Distributors
- Release date: 1 October 1936
- Running time: 76 minutes
- Countries: United Kingdom; United States
- Language: English

Everything Is Thunder is a 1936 British thriller film directed by Milton Rosmer and starring Constance Bennett, Douglass Montgomery and Oskar Homolka. It was written by Marion Dix and J. O. C. Orton based on the 1935 novel of the same title by Jocelyn Lee Hardy.

== Plot ==
In the First World War, English officer Hugh McGrath escapes from a German internment camp, and makes his way to Berlin. There, he is befriended by Anna von Stucknadel, a prostitute, who chooses to help him escape Germany despite knowing his identity. One of her friends is Schenck Götz, the detective tasked with tracking McGrath down. Just yards from the Dutch frontier, Götz finally corners the fleeing couple. However, moved by the love he sees between them, Götz has a change of heart and allows them to cross the border. As McGrath carries Anna into the Dutch mist, Götz is shot by a smuggler.

== Cast ==
- Constance Bennett as Anna von Stucknadel
- Douglass Montgomery as Hugh McGrath
- Oskar Homolka as Detective Schenck Götz
- Roy Emerton as Kostner
- Frederick Lloyd as Muller
- Peggy Simpson as Mitzi
- George Merritt as Webber
- Robert Atkins as Adjutant
- Terence Downing as Spicer
- Clifford Bartlett as Glendhill
- Albert Chevalier as McKenzie
- H. F. Maltby as Burgomaster
- Norman Pierce as Hans
- Frederick Piper as Policeman Denker
- Virginia Isham as war widow

== Production ==
The film was made at Lime Grove Studios in London, with art direction by Alfred Junge.

== Reception ==
The Monthly Film Bulletin wrote: "Unskilful and sentimental direction mar what is, in general, a painstaking production. Constance Bennett, in neat 1936 attire, plays Anna as a pretty but shallow tart; her hair is nicely brushed in every emergency. Hugh (Douglass Montgomery) is too scared to be romantic for long and seems rather naively shocked at her profession. Oscar Homolka, as Goertz, on the other hand, gives a splendid, lively performance. The dialogue, stilted and artificial, often foretells the action, so that the suspense – an essential factor of an escape story – is sadly lacking."

Graham Greene wrote in The Spectator: "The film is good entertainment, very ably directed and admirably acted by two of its three international stars. Mr Douglass Montgomery as Captain McGrath, the escaper, gives a nervous, hunted, goose-fleshed performance, and Mr Oscar Homolka as the police detective ... breathes into a film that grows at times dangerously lyrical a pleasing coarseness... As for Miss Constance Bennett it would be unfair to say much. I suspect that her blurred blonde performance can be laid to the account of our maleficent Board of Censors, who have imposed on Miss Bennett the complicated task of acting a prostitute without ever mentioning her profession. ...The book was not sentimental: the film is".

Variety wrote: "British standards in productions of this type of story are closely folIowed: dim lighting is a British idea of heightening the dramatic moments: dense, smoky fog is another And Milton Rosmer's jumpy direction cannot be considered an asset. Acting is okay all around, the Bennett-Montgomery-Homolka trio carrying the entire story, with everyone else in the cast only holding bit parts.'"
