= Kibitzer =

Spectator of a chess or card game who offers unwanted advice or commentary

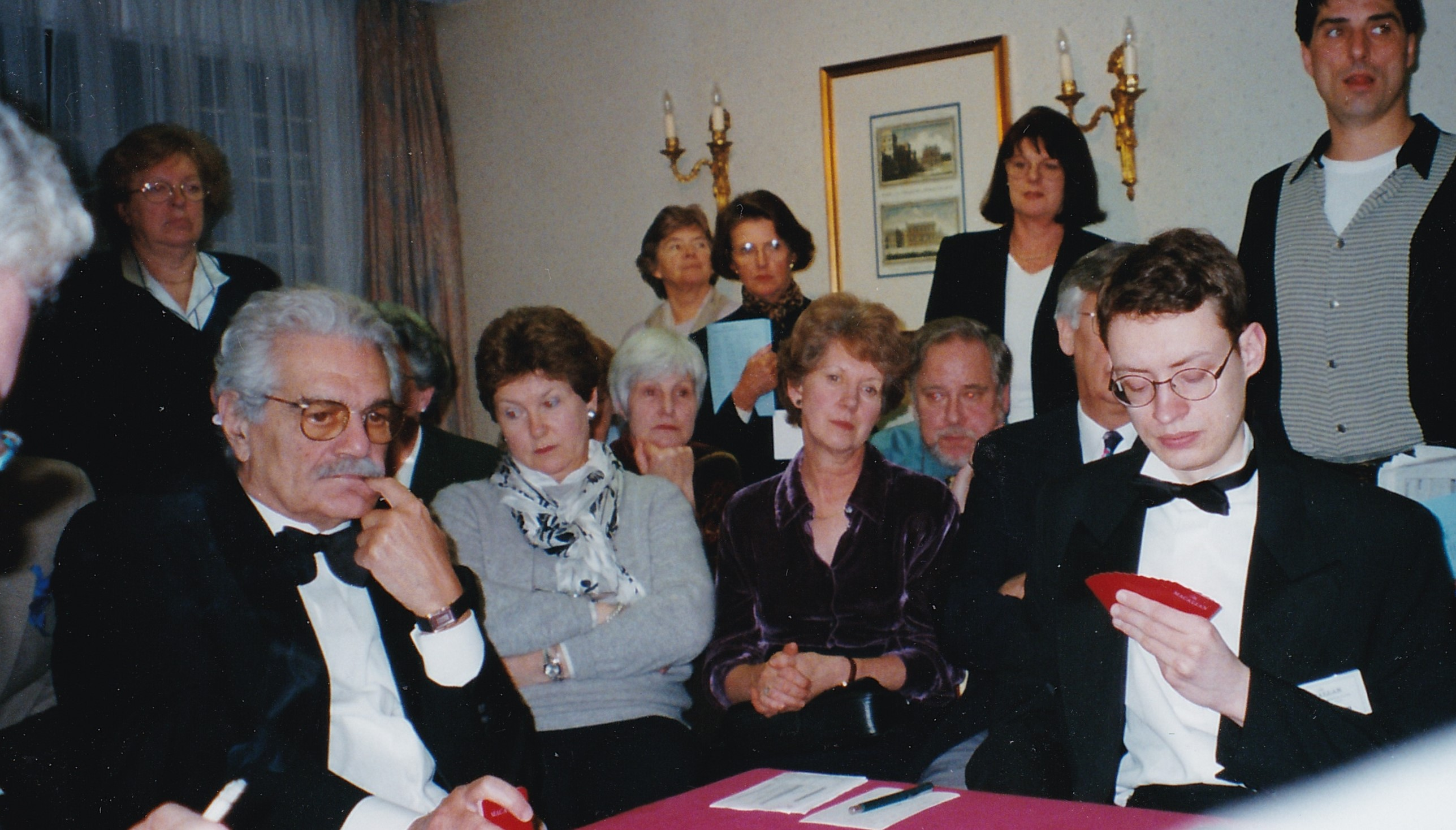
Kibitzers watching Omar Sharif play bridge

Kibitzer is a Yiddish term for a spectator, usually one who offers advice or commentary. The term can be applied to any activity, but is most commonly used to describe spectators in games such as contract bridge, chess, Go, and Schafkopf.

In card games, a kibitzer simply refers to a spectator watching a player's hand; kibitzers are expected to remain silent and not impact the game.

Kibitz and kibitzer are derived from German kiebitzen, to look over a card-player's shoulder, perhaps derived from Kiebitz, a lapwing or peewit.

== Other uses ==
The verb kibitz can also refer to idle chatting or side conversations.

In computer science the term is the title of a programming language released by NIST, as a sub-project of the Expect programming language, that allows two users to share one shell session, taking turns typing one after another.

There is a 1930 film called The Kibitzer which is based on the 1929 three-act comedy play by the same name.

Jane Jacobs describes a kibitzer as someone who keeps a look-out on a street, and seeing suspicious activity, intervenes to help the victim. In this way, kibitzers help keep streets safe.

== See also ==
- Glossary of card game terms
