= When's Your Birthday? =

1937 film by Harry Beaumont

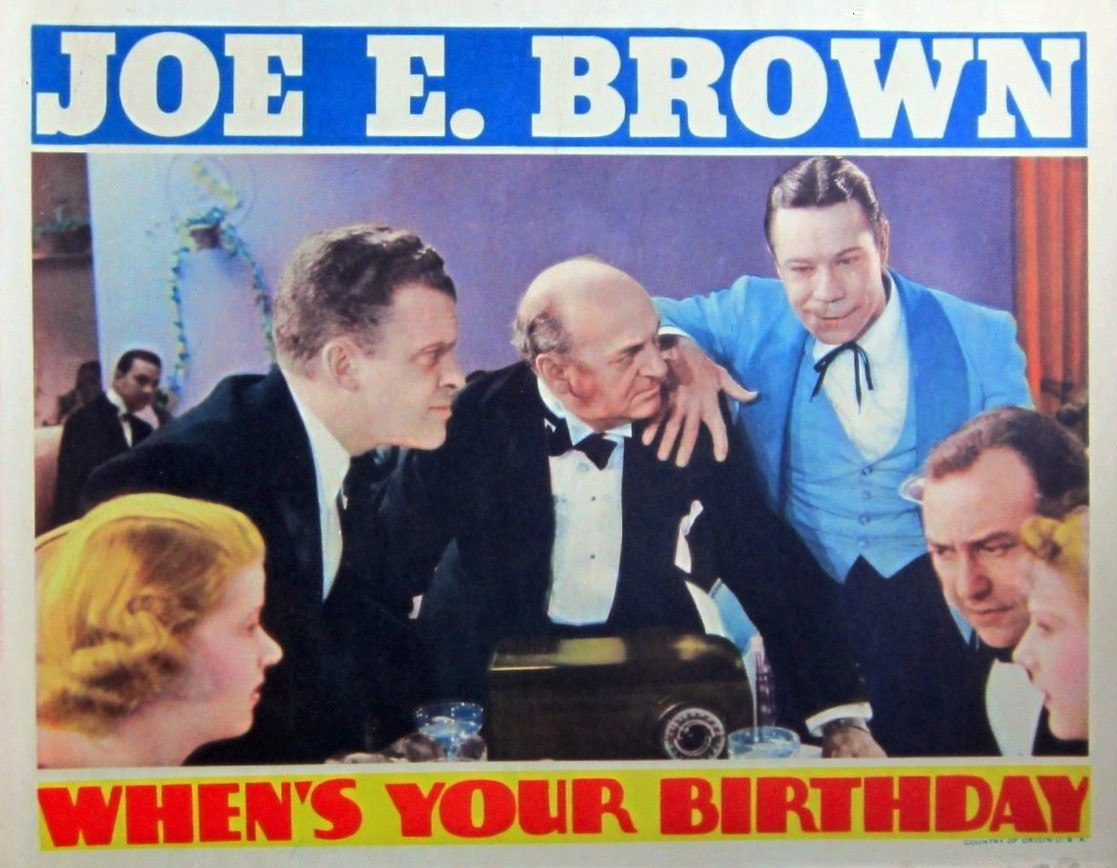
- lobby card
- Directed by: Harry Beaumont
- Written by: Harvey Gates; Malcolm Stuart Boylan; Samuel M. Pyke
- Screenplay by: Harry Clork; H.W. Hanemann; Richard Macaulay
- Based on: A play by John Frederick Ballard
- Produced by: Robert Harris; David L. Loew
- Starring: Joe E. Brown; Marian Marsh
- Cinematography: George Robinson
- Edited by: Jack Ogilvie
- Music by: Sam Wineland; John Leipold; Marlin Skiles
- Production company: David L. Loew Productions
- Distributed by: RKO Radio Pictures
- Release date: February 19, 1937
- Running time: 75 minutes
- Country: United States
- Languages: English; Spanish

When's Your Birthday? is a 1937 American romantic comedy film directed by Harry Beaumont and starring Joe E. Brown. While original prints of this film had a cartoon sequence in Technicolor directed by Bob Clampett and produced by Leon Schlesinger, most surviving prints (including the Internet Archive) have the sequence in black-and-white. The film's copyright was not renewed, and it is in the public domain.

== Plot ==
The animated opening sequence directed by Bob Clampett

Dustin Willoughby is a prizefighter and believer in astrology who only wins when the stars are in alignment.

== Cast ==
- Joe E. Brown as Dustin Willoughby
- Marian Marsh as Jerry Grant
- Fred Keating as Larry Burke
- Edgar Kennedy as Mr. Henry Basscombe
- Maude Eburne as Mrs. Fanny Basscombe
- Suzanne Kaaren as Diane Basscombe
- Margaret Hamilton as Mossy - the Maid
- Minor Watson as James J. Regan
- Frank Jenks as Lefty - Regan's Henchman
- Don Rowan - Steve as Regan's Henchman
- Granville Bates as Judge O'Day
- Charles Judels as Acropolis, the Headwaiter
- Corky as Zodiac, the Dog

== Soundtrack ==
- "Toreador Song" from Carmen by Georges Bizet
- William Tell Overture by Gioachino Rossini
- Happy Birthday to You by Mildred J. Hill and Patty Hill
- Ruth Robin with Manny Harmon and His Orchestra – I Love You from Coast to Coast, music and lyrics by Albert Stillman, Alex Hyde and Basil Adlam
- Sobre las Olas (Over the Waves) by Juventino Rosas
- Stars and Stripes Forever by John Philip Sousa
- When the Moon Comes over the Mountain, music and lyrics by Kate Smith, Howard Johnson and Harry M. Woods
