= Maurice Bedel =

French novelist and essayist

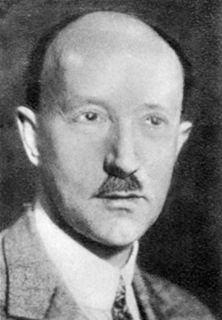
Maurice Bedel in 1927

Maurice Bedel (Paris, 30 December 1883 – Thuré (Vienne), 15 October 1954) was a French novelist and essayist.

He was awarded the prix Goncourt in 1927 for Jérôme 60° latitude nord. He was elected in 1948 as president of the Société des gens de lettres.

== Works ==
- Jérôme 60° latitude nord (1927)
- Molinoff Indre-et-Loire (1928)
- Philippine (1930)
- Fascisme an VII (1929)
- L'Amour camarade (1931)
- Une Enquête sur l'amour (1932)
- Zulfu (1933)
- Zigzags (1932)
- la Nouvelle Arcadie (1934)
- l'Alouette aux nuages (1935)
- Mémoire sans malice sur les dames d'aujourd'hui (1935)
- la Touraine (1935)
- Monsieur le professeur Jubier (1936)
- le Laurier d'Apollon (1936)
- Géographie de mille hectares (1937)
- Bengali (1937)
- la France des Français et celle des autres (1937)
- Monsieur Hitler (1937)
- Berthe au grand pied (1943)
- Traité du plaisir (1946)
- Destin de la personne humaine (1948)
- Tropiques noirs (1950)
- le Mariage des couleurs (1951)
- Voyage de Jérôme aux États-Unis d'Amérique (1953)
- Histoire de mille hectares (1953)
