= Frank Campeau =

American actor

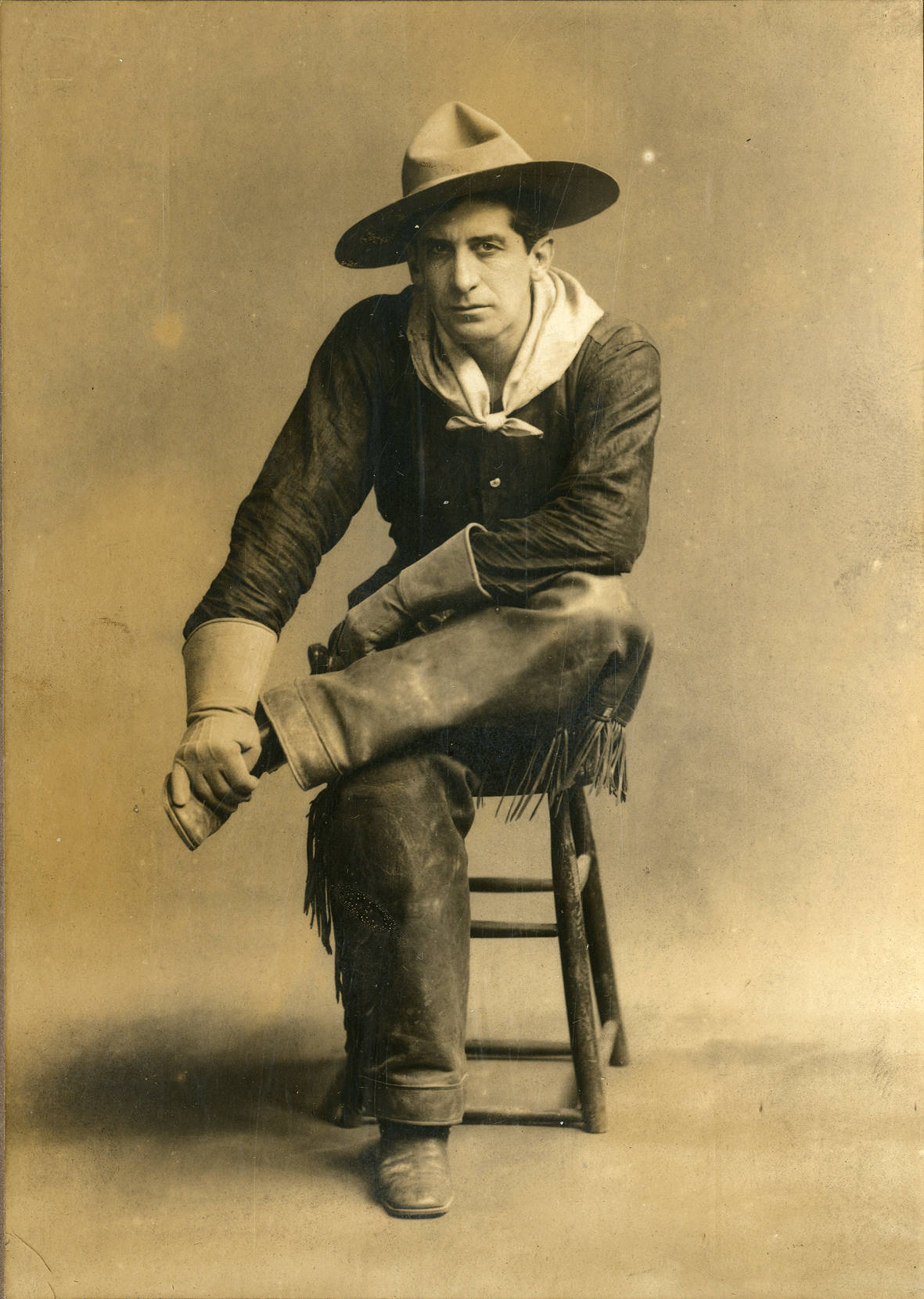
- Campeau in 1905
- Born: December 14, 1864; Detroit, Michigan, U.S.
- Died: November 5, 1943 (aged 78); Woodland Hills, Los Angeles, U.S.
- Occupation: Actor
- Years active: 1911–1940
- Spouses: Lillian Corbin (m. 1907; div. 1917) Estelle Lewis (m. 1923; div. 1926)

Frank Campeau (December 14, 1864 – November 5, 1943) was an American actor. He appeared in more than 90 films between 1911 and 1940 and made many appearances in films starring Douglas Fairbanks.

On Broadway, Campeau appeared in The Virginian (1904), Believe Me, Xantippe (1913), The Ghost Breaker (1913), and Rio Grande (1916). Campeau's screen debut came in the one-reel western film Kit Carson's Wooing.

He was born in Detroit, Michigan, and died in the Motion Picture & Television Country House and Hospital in Woodland Hills, Los Angeles.

== Filmography ==
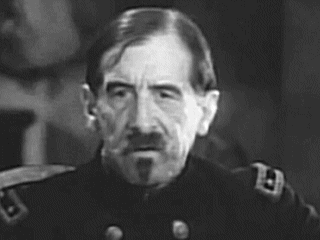
Campeau as General Philip Sheridan in Abraham Lincoln (1930)

- Jordan Is a Hard Road (1915) - Bill Minden
- The Wood Nymph (1916) - David Arnold
- Intolerance (1916) - Minor Role (uncredited)
- The Heart of Texas Ryan (1917) - 'Dice' McAllister
- The Man from Painted Post (1917) - 'Bull' Madden
- Reaching for the Moon (1917) - Black Boris
- A Modern Musketeer (1917) - Chin-de-dah
- Headin' South (1918) - Spanish Joe
- Mr. Fix-It (1918) - Uncle Henry Burroughs
- Say! Young Fellow (1918) - The Villain
- Bound in Morocco (1918) - Basha El Harib - Governor of Harib
- He Comes Up Smiling (1918) - John Bartlett
- The Light of Western Stars (1918) - Minor Role
- Arizona (1918) - Kellar
- Cheating Cheaters (1919) - Steven Wilson
- The Knickerbocker Buckaroo (1919) - Crooked Sheriff
- His Majesty, the American (1919) - Grand Duke Sarzeau
- When the Clouds Roll by (1919) - Mark Drake
- The Mollycoddle (1920) - Man at Trading Post (uncredited)
- Life of the Party (1920) - Judge Voris
- The Kid (1921) - Welfare Officer (uncredited)
- The Killer (1921) - Henry Hooper
- The Nut (1921) - Ulysses S. Grant Impersonator (uncredited)
- For Those We Love (1921) - Frank
- The Sin of Martha Queed (1921) - David Boyd
- The Lane That Had No Turning (1922) - Tardiff
- The Greater Duty (1922)
- The Crimson Challenge (1922) - Basil Courtrey (uncredited)
- The Trap (1922) - The Police Sergeant
- Just Tony (1922) - Lew Hervey
- The Yosemite Trail (1922) - Jerry Smallbones
- Skin Deep (1922) - Boss McQuarg
- Three Who Paid (1923) - Edward Sanderson
- The Spider and the Rose (1923) - Don Fernando
- Quicksands (1923) - Ring Member
- The Isle of Lost Ships (1923) - Detective Jackson
- Modern Matrimony (1923) - Mr. Flynn
- To the Last Man (1923) - Blue
- The Meanest Man in the World (1923)
- North of Hudson Bay (1923) - Cameron McDonald
- Hoodman Blind (1923) - Mark Lezzard
- Not a Drum Was Heard (1924) - Banker Rand
- Those Who Dance (1924) - 'Slip' Blaney
- The Alaskan (1924) - Stampede Smith
- Battling Bunyan (1924) - Jim Canby
- Coming Through (1925) - Shackleton
- The Saddle Hawk (1925) - Buck Brent
- Heir-Loons (1925) - Brockton family member
- Manhattan Madness (1925) - The Butler
- The Man from Red Gulch (1925) - John Falloner
- The Golden Cocoon (1925) - Mr. Bancroft
- The Pleasure Buyers (1925) - Quintard
- Sea Horses (1926) - Senor Cordoza
- The Frontier Trail (1926) - Shad Donlin
- 3 Bad Men (1926) - 'Spade' Allen
- No Man's Gold (1926) - Frank Healy
- Whispering Wires (1926) - Andrew Morphy
- Let It Rain (1927) - Marine Major
- The Heart of the Yukon (1927) - Old Skin Full
- The First Auto (1927) - Mayor Sam Robbins
- In Old Arizona (1928) - Man Chasing Cisco (uncredited)
- The Candy Kid (1928)
- Frozen River (1929) - Potter
- The Gamblers (1929) - Raymond
- Say It with Songs (1929) - Police Officer
- Points West (1929) - McQuade
- In the Headlines (1929) - Detective Robinson
- Sea Fury (1929) - Boatswain
- Hide-Out (1930)
- Abraham Lincoln (1930) - General Sheridan
- The Last of the Duanes (1930) - Luke Stevens
- A Soldier's Plaything (1930) - Joe
- Lightnin' (1930) - Sheriff Brooks (uncredited)
- Captain Thunder (1930) - Hank
- Fighting Caravans (1931) - Jeff Moffitt
- Lasca of the Rio Grande (1931) - Jehosaphat Smith
- Girl of the Rio (1932) - Bill
- Smoky (1933) - 'Scrubby'
- Hop-Along Cassidy (1935) - Henchman Frisco
- Call of the Wild (1935) - Sourdough on Street (uncredited)
- The Robin Hood of El Dorado (1936) - Steve - Coach Driver (uncredited)
- Everyman's Law (1936) - Tinker Gibbs
- The Border Patrolman (1936) - Capt. Stevens
- Empty Saddles (1936) - Kit Kress
- The Firefly (1937) - Beggar (uncredited)
- Black Aces (1937) - Cowhand Ike Bowlaigs
- The Painted Trail (1938) - U. S. Marshal G. Masters
- Border Wolves (1938) - Surviving Wagon Driver
- Marie Antoinette (1938) - Lemonade Vendor (uncredited)
- King of the Sierras (1938) - Jim
- Murder on the Yukon (1940) - Man in the Store (uncredited)
