= The Kibitzer =

1930 film

- Directed by: Edward Sloman
- Screenplay by: Marion Dix; Sam Mintz; Viola Brothers Shore
- Based on: The Kibitzer by: Jo Swerling; Edward G. Robinson (play)
- Starring: Harry Green; Mary Brian; Neil Hamilton; Albert Gran; David Newell; Guy Oliver
- Cinematography: Alfred Gilks
- Edited by: Eda Warren
- Music by: W. Franke Harling
- Production company: Paramount Pictures
- Distributed by: Paramount Pictures
- Release date: January 11, 1930
- Running time: 77 minutes
- Country: United States
- Language: English

The Kibitzer is a 1930 American pre-Code comedy film directed by Edward Sloman and written by Marion Dix, Sam Mintz and Viola Brothers Shore. It is based on the 1929 play The Kibitzer by Jo Swerling and Edward G. Robinson. The film stars Harry Green, Mary Brian, Neil Hamilton, Albert Gran, David Newell and Guy Oliver. The film was released on January 11, 1930, by Paramount Pictures.

== Outline ==
A gentle comedy about a Jewish character who keeps giving people advice, i.e. kibitzing. His advice creates all kinds of complications, especially after he comes into a large sum of money to dispose of as he pleases. The character is played by Harry Green, who specialised in playing Jewish comedic characters.

== Cast ==
- Harry Green as Ike Lazarus
- Mary Brian as Josie Lazarus
- Neil Hamilton as Eddie Brown
- Albert Gran as James Livingston
- David Newell as Bert Livingston
- Guy Oliver as McGinty
- Tenen Holtz as Meyer
- Henry Fink as Kikapoupolos
- Lee Kohlmar as Yankel
- E. H. Calvert as Westcott
- Thomas A. Curran as Briggs
- Eddie Kane as Phillips
- Henry A. Barrows as Hanson
- Paddy O'Flynn as Reporter
- Dick Rush as Mullins
- Eugene Pallette as Klaus
