= Way for a Sailor =

1930 film

- Directed by: Sam Wood (uncredited)
- Screenplay by: Laurence Stallings and W. L. River (scenario and dialogue); Charles MacArthur; Al Boasberg (additional dialogue)
- Based on: Way for a Sailor! 1928 novel by Albert Richard Wetjen
- Produced by: A Sam Wood Production
- Starring: John Gilbert; Wallace Beery; Jim Tully; Leila Hyams; Polly Moran
- Cinematography: Percy Hilburn
- Edited by: Frank Sullivan
- Distributed by: Metro-Goldwyn-Mayer
- Release date: November 1, 1930
- Running time: 85 minutes
- Country: United States
- Language: English

Way for a Sailor is a 1930 American pre-Code film starring John Gilbert. The supporting cast includes Wallace Beery, Jim Tully, Leila Hyams, and Polly Moran. The film was directed by Sam Wood, who insisted on no screen credit.

MGM produced a Spanish language version of this film, Love in Every Port, starring Jose Crespo and Conchita Montenegro.

== Plot ==
The film follows three merchant marine sailors—Jack, Tripod and Ginger—back and forth between their home port of London and the seaports of the world, drinking, brawling, gambling, pursuing prostitutes (actually anyone in a skirt), fighting a fire aboard ship and each other, and signing on a new vessel as soon as they have spent their pay.

Jack has dozens of girls in every port, but in London he meets his match in Joan, who works in the Shipping Office. For years, he tries in vain to seduce her. When he returns from a 6-month trip to China and finds her gone, he tracks her to her home. She asks him in for a cup of tea with a little rum in it, but he ruins it by grabbing her and kissing her fiercely.

She sends him away, with her extra teacup: She will not make another mistake. But he follows her to the shore and talks about his love of the sea. He offers to get a steady, well-paying job as a quartermaster, but that won't do either. At the end of the day, she tells him she is sailing home to Montreal on the Canadian Queen. He asks if he can kiss her, with his hands behind his back. She agrees—and throws her arms around him. She wants to go. Tripod appears with a woman and grabs Joan hard, by her arms to make her stay. She runs off, crying. Their ship must leave. Once they are aboard, Tripod teases Jack relentlessly.

Tripod covets a real Eureka concertina, and Jack says he knows a man who has one. Jack offers to buy it and meet Tripod in the morning. He uses the money collected from Tripod and their crewmates to buy a somewhat old-fashioned suit from a pawnbroker.

Joan is still in London. He tells her that he beat up Tripod and Ginger: He now has a civilian job. He proposes and they marry. When they return to her room, he tells her he lied: There is no job, and his ship, The Chinese Star, sails on the evening tide. Joan is very upset. He dismisses her feelings and goes out to get some rum. Finding the crew in the pub, he announces his marriage. They take him back to the pawnbroker and frighten the man into returning the money for the suit. Tripod steals a concertina.

Jack finds Joan gone. The Chinese Star sails without him.

The Canadian Queen is steaming through rough seas. Joan is aboard. Jack is quartermaster. She tears up the marriage certificate, furious that he was willing to ruin her whole life for a few minutes of pleasure. The storm worsens, The Chinese Star is nearby and coming to pieces, all lifeboats gone. The Canadian Queen sends out a lifeboat. A ship's officer explains to Joan that the plan is to rig lifelines between the ships so the men aboard the Chinese Star can be rescued, one at a time.

The lifeboat founders, but some men in life jackets are rescued. Meanwhile, a bosun's chair goes back and forth between the sinking vessel and the rescue ship. Most crew are rescued, but the Captain goes down with his ship.

In calm daylight, Jack and Ginger are picked up by a whaling vessel. Jack found the concertina, floating. He throws it back into the ocean, to honor his pal, just as Tripod comes out on deck. Tripod tosses Ginger overboard to retrieve it. Last night, Tripod told them to swim toward the whaler's light.

After 6 months with the whaler, they return to London. Ginger has a gigantic fur hat for Mamie, but she is nowhere in sight. Tripod says he should have sent an expensive wire like the one Jack sent to Joan. Tripod's arms are full of his pet sea lion, Alfred, and Joan's arms are full of a baby. It turns out she is holding it for someone. Joan and Jack reconcile and he sweeps her up in his arms and rushes through the crowd crying “Way for the sailor!”

== Cast ==
- John Gilbert as Jack
- Wallace Beery as Tripod
- Jim Tully as Ginger
- Leila Hyams as Joan
- Polly Moran as Polly
- Doris Lloyd as Flossy
- Ray Milland as a ship's officer who speaks to Joan

== Reception ==
In his December 13, 1930 review in The New York Times, Mordaunt Hall observed that in “John Gilbert's long-delayed second talking film, …he gives a better performance than he did in his previous audible production. The story is a strange mixture of low comedy and unconvincing romance, with Mr. Beery walking off with what honors are to be had. …glimpses of the work aboard freighters, the rescuing of men from a sinking vessel and other such views are infinitely more interesting than the actual domgs of the characters…”
