= Love in Every Port =

1931 film

- Directed by: Carlos F. Borcosque; Marcel Silver
- Written by: Edgar Neville; Charles MacArthur
- Based on: Way for a Sailor! 1928 novel by Albert Richard Wetjen
- Produced by: Frank Davis
- Starring: José Crespo; Conchita Montenegro; Juan de Landa
- Cinematography: Harold Rosson; Leonard Smith
- Edited by: Peggy O'Day
- Production company: Metro-Goldwyn-Mayer
- Distributed by: Metro-Goldwyn-Mayer
- Release date: March 27, 1931
- Running time: 91 minutes
- Country: United States
- Language: Spanish

Love in Every Port (Spanish: En cada puerto un amor) is a 1931 American drama film directed by Carlos F. Borcosque and Marcel Silver and starring José Crespo, Conchita Montenegro and Juan de Landa. It is the Spanish-language version of Way for a Sailor directed by Sam Wood. Translating and altering the original script was overseen by Edgar Neville, a Spaniard with strong connections in the United States, and was part of a trend of making multiple language versions during the early years of sound before dubbing became more commonplace.

== Cast ==
- José Crespo as Jack
- Conchita Montenegro as Elena
- Juan de Landa as Tripode
- Romualdo Tirado as Timon
- Elena Landeros as Margot
- Rosita Granada as Lulu

== Bibliography ==
- Bentley, Bernard. A Companion to Spanish Cinema. Boydell & Brewer 2008.
