= Philippa Hilber =

American actress (1918–1996)

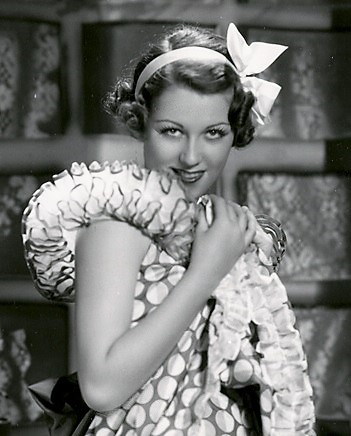
- Born: January 22, 1918; Los Angeles, California, U.S.
- Died: June 16, 1996 (aged 78); Los Angeles, California, U.S.
- Occupation: Actress
- Years active: 1933–1938
- Spouse: Bill Goodwin (1936-1958) Joseph Pevney (1989-1996)
- Children: 4

Philippa Hilber (January 22, 1918 – June 16, 1996) was an American actress.

== Early life ==
Hilber was born in Los Angeles, California. She was the daughter of Philip Melbourne Hilber and Vera Thornton and had one half-brother. She grew up in San Bernardino and started to appear in school plays at the age of 11 and at the age of 15 she started her movie career.

== Career ==
Hilber started her film career in 1933, appearing in films such as Arizona to Broadway, Roman Scandals, Moulin Rouge, Stand Up and Cheer!, Redheads on Parade, Piernas de Seda, King of Burlesque, Girls' Dormitory, You Can't Have Everything, Wife, Doctor and Nurse, Second Honeymoon, Love and Hisses and Kentucky Moonshine. After that, she left movies to raise her children.

== Personal life ==
Hilber married Bill Goodwin in 1936. The couple had four children. Their marriage lasted twenty-two years until her husband death in 1958. Hilber became a successful real agent during the 1970s. She married her second husband, Joseph Pevney, in 1989 and this marriage lasted until her death in 1996.

== Filmography ==
=== Film ===
- Arizona to Broadway (1933) - Dancer (uncredited)
- Roman Scandals (1933) - Shantytown Resident . Goldwyn Girl (uncredited)
- Moulin Rouge (1934) - Show Girl (uncredited)
- Stand Up and Cheer! (1934) - Chorine (uncredited)
- Redheads on Parade (1935) - Rhumba Specialty Dancer (uncredited)
- Piernas de Seda (1935) - Ballerina (uncredited)
- King of Burlesque (1936) - Dancer (uncredited)
- Girls' Dormitory (1936) - Student (uncredited)
- You Can't Have Everything (1937) - Chorus Girl (uncredited)
- Wife, Doctor and Nurse (1937) - Stenographer (uncredited)
- Second Honeymoon (1937) - Telephone Operator (uncredited)
- Love and Hisses (1937) - Minor Role (uncredited)
- Kentucky Moonshine (1938) - Secretary (uncredited)
