= June Havoc =

American actress, vaudeville performer and memoirist (1912–2010)

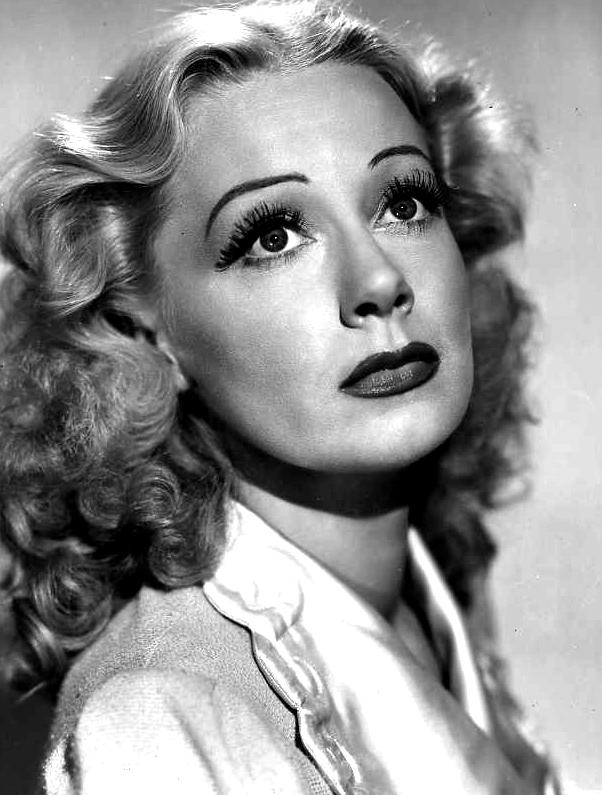
- Havoc c. 1944
- Born: Ellen Evangeline Hovick; November 8, 1912; Vancouver, British Columbia, Canada
- Died: March 28, 2010 (aged 97); Stamford, Connecticut, U.S.
- Occupations: Actress; dancer; stage director; memoirist; playwright
- Years active: 1918–1997
- Known for: Pal Joey; My Sister Eileen; No Time for Love; Mexican Hayride; Hello, Frisco, Hello; When 'My Baby Smiles at Me; Red, Hot and Blue; Gentleman's Agreement
- Spouse(s): Bobby Reed (m. 1928; div. 193?) Donald S. Gibbs (m. 1935; div. 1942) William Spier (m. 1948; died 1973)
- Children: 1
- Mother: Rose Thompson Hovick
- Relatives: Gypsy Rose Lee (sister)
- Awards: American Theater Hall of Fame; Hollywood Walk of Fame

Signature
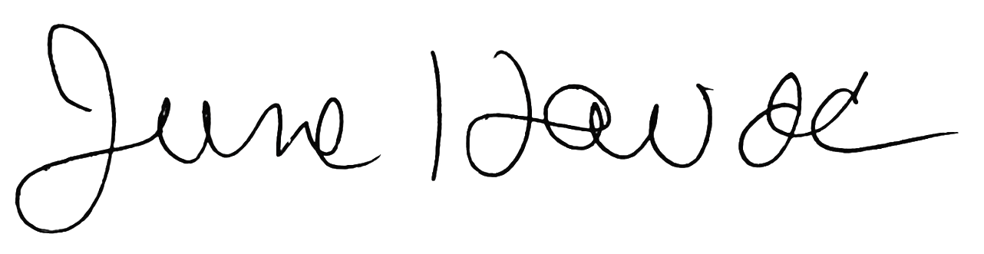

June Havoc (born Ellen Evangeline Hovick; November 8, 1912 – March 28, 2010) was a Canadian-born American actress, dancer, stage director and memoirist.

Havoc was a child vaudeville performer under the tutelage of her mother Rose Thompson Hovick, born Rose Evangeline Thompson. June later acted on Broadway and in Hollywood, and stage-directed, both on and off-Broadway. She last acted on television in 1990 in a story arc on the soap opera General Hospital, and she last appeared on television as herself in interviews in the "Vaudeville" episode of American Masters in 1997 and in "The Rodgers & Hart: Thou Swell, Thou Witty" episode of Great Performances in 1999. Her elder sister Louise gravitated to burlesque and became the well-known striptease performer Gypsy Rose Lee.

== Early life ==
Ellen Evangeline Hovick was born in Vancouver, British Columbia, Canada on November 8, 1912. For many years 1916 was cited as her year of birth. Havoc acknowledged in her later years that 1912 was likely the correct year. She was reportedly uncertain of the year. Her mother forged various birth certificates for both her daughters to evade child labor laws. Her life-long career in show business began when she was a child, billed as "Baby June."

Her sister, entertainer Gypsy Rose Lee (born as Rose Louise Hovick), was called "Louise" by her family members. Their parents were Rose Thompson Hovick, of German descent, and John ("Jack") Olaf Hovick, the son of Norwegian immigrants, who worked as an advertising agent and reporter for the Seattle Times newspaper.

== Career ==
=== Vaudeville ===
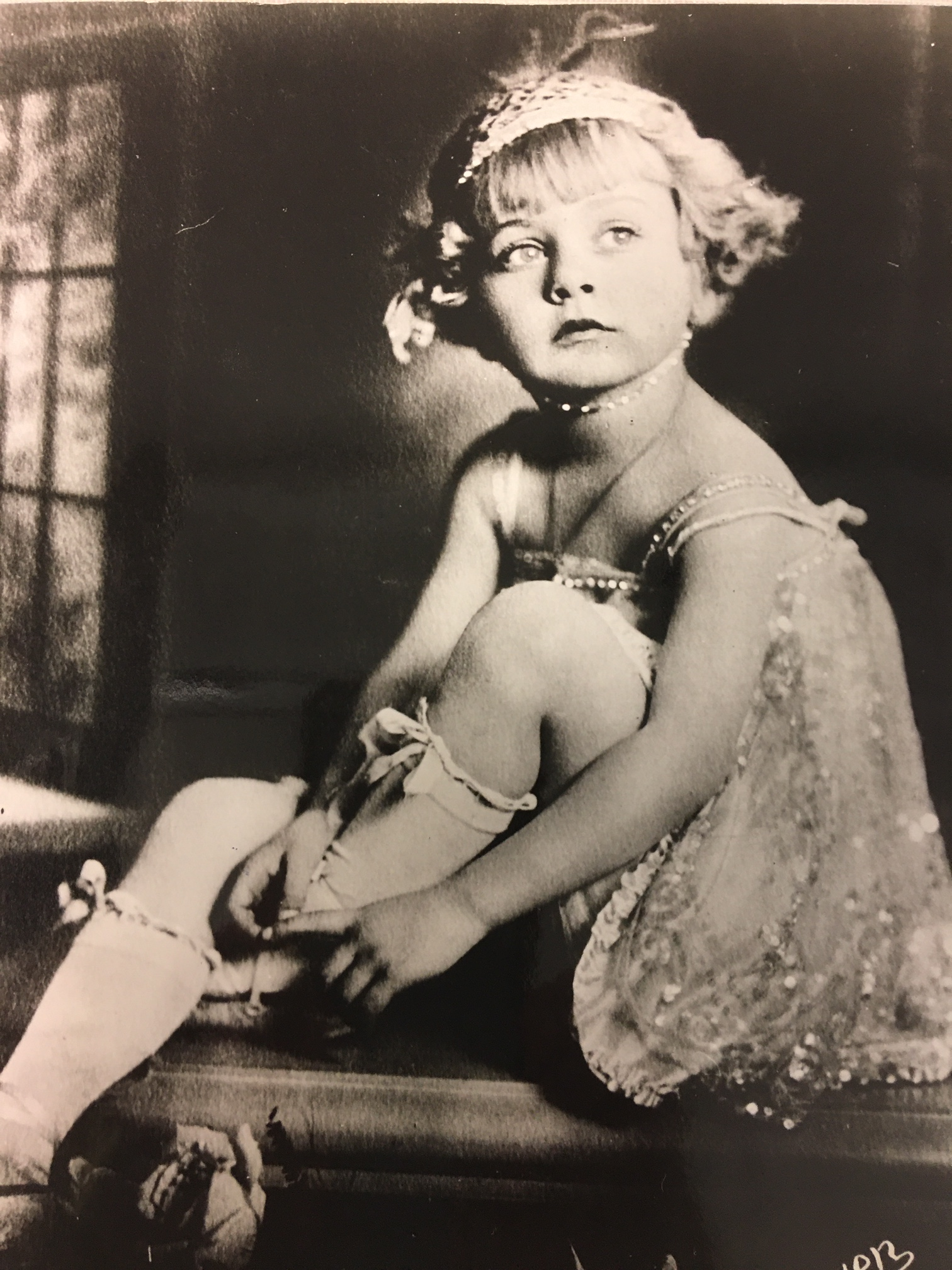
Baby June c. 1916–1917

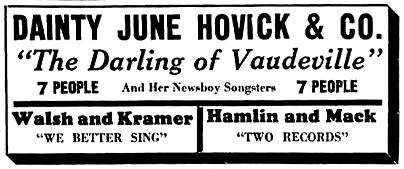
November 13, 1927 ad in The Decatur Review By age 15, "Baby June" had become "Dainty June."

Following their parents' divorce, the two sisters earned the family's income by appearing in vaudeville, where June's talent often overshadowed Louise's. Baby June got an audition with Alexander Pantages, who had come to Seattle, Washington in 1902 to build theaters up and down the west coast of the United States. Soon, she was launched in vaudeville and also appeared in Hollywood movies. She could not speak until the age of three, but the films were all silent. She would cry for the cameras when her mother told her that the family's dog had died.

In December 1928, Havoc, in an effort to escape her overbearing mother, eloped with Bobby Reed, a young boy dancer in the vaudeville act. Weeks later after they performed at the Jayhawk Theatre in Topeka, Kansas, on December 29, 1928, June's mother, Rose, reported Reed to the Topeka Police, and he was arrested. Rose pulled out a concealed gun when she met Bobby at the police station, intending to shoot him, but the gun did not fire because the safety was on. She then physically attacked her son-in-law, and the police had to pry her off the hapless Reed. June subsequently left both her family and the act. Though the marriage didn't last long, the two remained friends.

=== Film and stage ===
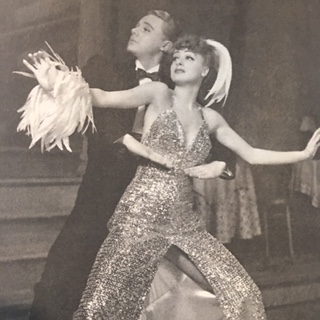
June Havoc with chorus boy Van Johnson in the 1940 original production of Pal Joey

She adopted the surname Havoc, a variant of her birth name. In 1936, Havoc got her first part on Broadway in the Sigmund Romberg operetta Forbidden Melody. In 1940, she gave a show-stopping performance as Gladys Bumps in the Rodgers and Hart musical Pal Joey, with Gene Kelly in the lead role and Van Johnson, who was in the chorus, along with future film director Stanley Donen. Based on their success, Havoc, Johnson and Kelly were beckoned by Hollywood. Havoc made her first film in 1942 and began to alternate film roles with returns to the Broadway stage. From 1942 to 1944, Havoc appeared in 11 films, including My Sister Eileen with Rosalind Russell, and No Time for Love with Claudette Colbert and Fred MacMurray. She then returned to Broadway in the 1943–44 season, co-starring with Bobby Clark in the Cole Porter musical Mexican Hayride (musical), for which she received the Donaldson Award for best performance by an actress in a supporting role in a musical.

In 1944, Ethel Merman was tapped to star as the title character in the musical play Sadie Thompson, with a score by Vernon Duke and Howard Dietz, directed and produced by Rouben Mamoulian. The musical play was based on the short story Rain by W. Somerset Maugham. The serious production was a departure from Merman’s string of successful musical comedies. Moreover, during rehearsals, Merman had difficulties memorizing the lyrics, and she blamed Dietz for his use of sophisticated and foreign words. She had her husband, newspaper promotion director Bob Levitt, tone down some of the lyrics. Dietz took exception to Merman’s singing the altered lyrics and gave her an ultimatum to sing his original lyrics or leave the show. In response, Merman withdrew from the production. (Some have since speculated that Merman's departure was probably due to her reluctance to assume such a serious role in her first dramatic musical.)

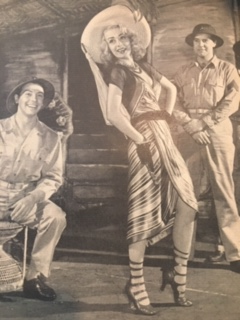
June Havoc in the title role in the 1943 Broadway musical Sadie Thompson

Havoc left her starring role in Mexican Hayride, and assumed the role written for Merman. The production of Sadie Thompson had a difficult out-of-town tryout with songs being deleted and other songs added. Indeed, even after the Broadway opening, musical numbers continued to be cut and other numbers added. Sadie Thompson opened on Broadway on November 16, 1944, to mixed reviews. Havoc received almost uniformly favorable reviews. She was called the “most enjoyable asset” of the show and praised for the “consummate skill of her artistry.” Her performance was described as “surprisingly effective“ and “truly touching,” and she was deemed a “worthy successor” to Jeanne Eagels, who had famously first portrayed the role on Broadway in the play Rain. The score and the book received mixed reviews, with the score called “undistinguished.” However, one reviewer compared the show favorably to Oklahoma!, which Mamoulian had also directed. Nonetheless, the show lasted only 60 performances and closed on January 6, 1945. In 1945, Havoc was featured in the film Brewster's Millions, and starred in The Ryan Girl on Broadway.

In Hollywood, Havoc played the second female lead for three of the most popular musical movie stars in the 1940s and early 1950s: Alice Faye in Hello, Frisco, Hello with John Payne (1943); Betty Grable in When My Baby Smiles at Me with Dan Dailey (1948); and Betty Hutton in Red, Hot, and Blue with Victor Mature (1949).

She also played leading roles in several films noir: Intrigue with George Raft (1947), Chicago Deadline with Alan Ladd (1949), The Story of Molly X with John Russell (1949), and Once A Thief with Cesar Romero (1950). Havoc's best-remembered film role was probably as the Jewish, yet closeted about her identity, secretary in the Elia Kazan Oscar-winning best film Gentleman's Agreement.

In the late 1950s, Havoc decided that she wanted to act in classic plays. In 1956, she worked with the Phoenix Theatre Company, first starring as Queen Jocasta opposite John Kerr in The Infernal Machine, playwright Jean Cocteau’s retelling of the Oedipus myth. New York Times critic Brooks Atkinson opined that her performance brought “a gravity and force that become the tragic situation.” Next Havoc played Titania in A Midsummer Night's Dream at the American Shakespeare Festival Theater & Academy. Atkinson called her Titania “conspicuously delightful” and found her performance, along with those of Barbara Barrie and Inga Swenson, “a fine Shakespeare revel.” She then returned to the Phoenix Theatre company for the production of The Beaux' Stratagem. Atkinson observed Havoc played Mrs. Sullen “as a lovely lady with an infectious sense of humor.”

Havoc and her sister continued to get demands for money and gifts from their mother until her death in 1954. After their mother's death, the sisters then were free to write about her without risking a lawsuit. Lee's memoir, Gypsy, published in 1957, inspired the Jule Styne, Stephen Sondheim, and Arthur Laurents Broadway musical Gypsy: A Musical Fable. Havoc did not like the way she or her mother were portrayed in the piece, which became a source of disagreement between the sisters, but did nothing to obstruct the production. Havoc and Lee were estranged for many years, but reconciled shortly before Lee's death in 1970.

In 1960, President Dwight D. Eisenhower authorized the creation of the President’s Special International Program, under the United States Department of State and its agent, the International Cultural Exchange Service of America. The Program, with the American National Theatre and Academy, established the Theatre Guild American Repertory Theatre to perform a program of plays abroad. Havoc, as well as Helen Hayes, Leif Erickson and others, made six-month commitments to participate in the repertory company. Three plays were selected to be performed in repertory: The Skin of Our Teeth, in which Havoc played Sabina and Hayes portrayed Mrs. Antrobus; The Miracle Worker, in which Havoc portrayed Mrs. Keller; and The Glass Menagerie, in which Hayes played the mother. The playwrights, Thornton Wilder, William Gibson and Tennessee Williams, all personally supervised the productions of their plays. In February and early March 1960, the repertory company performed the plays at the National Theater in Washington, D.C. Commencing later in March, the company toured in Europe and the Middle East, performing the plays in major cities in Spain, Belgium, the Netherlands, Greece, Egypt, Israel, Turkey, Germany, Denmark, Norway, Sweden, Finland, Italy, Switzerland and France. Later in the year, the repertory company toured Latin America, performing the same plays, and was the first American repertory theater company to perform in Latin America.

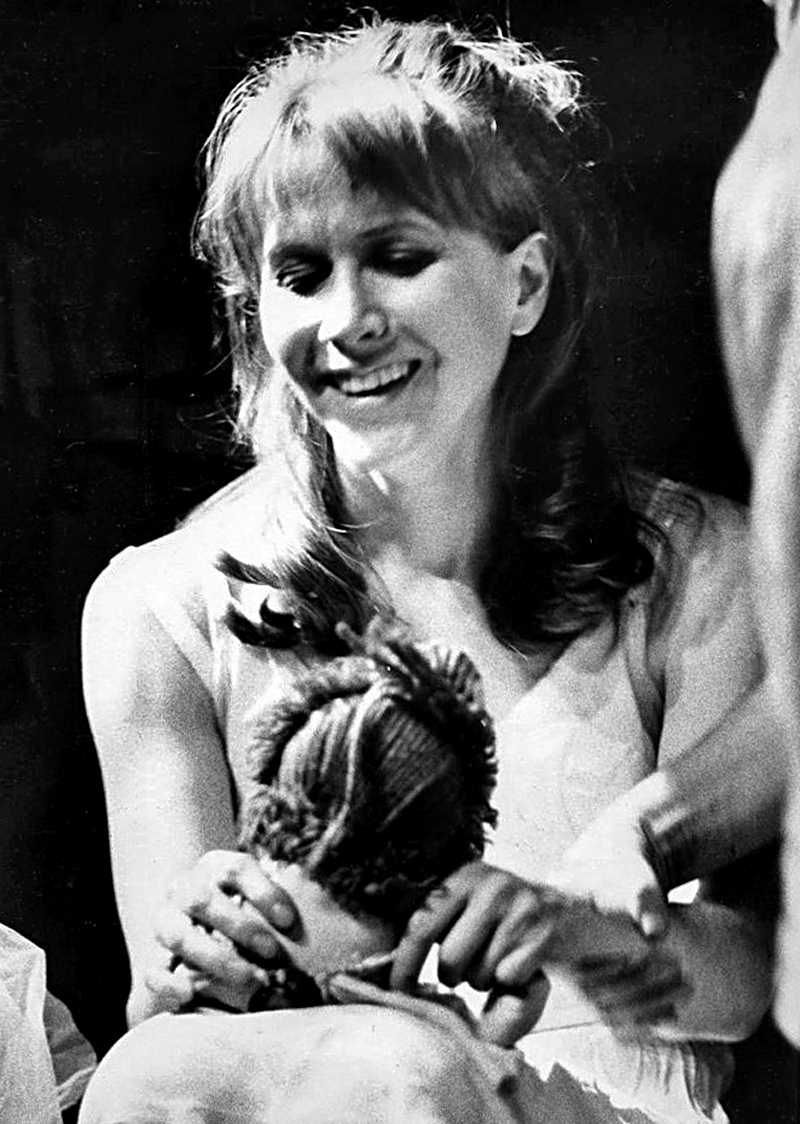
Julie Harris in the Broadway production of Marathon '33 (1963)

In 1959, Havoc's first memoir, Early Havoc, was published. The New York Times critic called the book "spirited" and "entertaining." In the memoir, Havoc recounted her life from childhood to 1933, when she first competed in a marathon dance contest. The chapters alternated between a chronological progression and a description of the grueling marathon dance contest, detailing the desperation and degradation she experienced and observed. At the time of the book's publication, Havoc was appearing on Broadway in the play The Warm Peninsula, co-starring Julie Harris and Farley Granger. Harris read the memoir and was so taken with the dance contest chapters she urged Havoc to write a play based upon that experience. At first she demurred, never having written a play. However, Harris persisted, and when she said she would star as Havoc's character in the play, Havoc was finally persuaded to write it. Upon completion, the play Marathon '33 was performed in a workshop at the Actors Studio. David Merrick optioned the play for Broadway with Gower Champion set to direct. However, Havoc canceled the option, explaining where Merrick wanted to turn the play into a musical. Champion responded Havoc had cancelled the option because Merrick had wanted her to work with another writer to revise the play, and she had refused.

Havoc then planned to present Marathon '33 in the Riviera Terrace ballroom, an actual dance hall. However, when the ballroom was sold, she agreed to present her play on Broadway. As director and choreographer, Havoc turned the stage at the ANTA Theatre into a dance hall. Marathon '33 proved to be a flop, opening on December 22, 1963, running for 48 performances and closing on February 1, 1964. The play featured 34 actors, several of whom had highly successful careers, including Doris Roberts, Joe Don Baker, Conrad Janis, Gabriel Dell and Ralph Waite. The play earned four Tony nominations, including nominations for Havoc for best direction of a play and for Harris as best actress in a play.

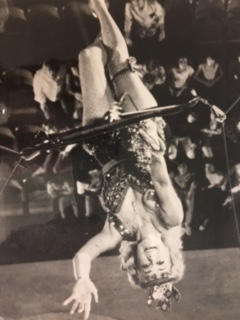
June Havoc as Sabina in The Skin of Our Teeth at The Repertory Theatre, New Orleans in 1970

Havoc wrote three more plays, I, Said The Fly, The Great State of Hysteria and The Great Elinor Glyn Emancipation Gun Powder Love Regatta; the book and lyrics for a musical, Oh Glorious Tintinnabulation; as well as a one-woman show and a second memoir, titled More Havoc. In reviewing More Havoc, The New York Times critic called Havoc a "writer of consequence" and described the book as "a vivid, biting and painfully real remembrance of her own walk on the wild side of the Depression years and on up through her triumph in Pal Joey and Hollywood stardom."

In 1966, Havoc appeared as Millicent Jordan in an all-star revival of Dinner at Eight on Broadway, directed by Sir Tyrone Guthrie, and featuring Walter Pidgeon, Arlene Francis, Darren McGavin and Pamela Tiffin. The New York Times critic Walter Kerr lauded Havoc’s performance as the hostess of the dinner, noting she was becoming this country’s Vivien Leigh. Kerr observed: “She makes the prospect of spending the entire day on the telephone rounding up a guest list, sound like work for a contented dove. That is to say, she coos cheerily, even with a pencil in her mouth, as she sets about buttering up all the people who can’t say, “no,” and she caresses her very chic white French phone with the exquisite finesse of a Victorian gentlewoman doing needlework.”

June Havoc as Miss Hannigan in the Broadway production of Annie, with Alyson Kirk as Annie, in 1982

During the presidency of Lyndon B. Johnson, the National Endowment for the Arts and the U.S. Department of Education provided funding in 1966 for the creation of professional theater programs in three cities: Los Angeles, New Orleans and Providence, Rhode Island. In New Orleans, the professional theater company was named The Repertory Theatre, New Orleans (“the Repertory Theatre”). The program involved 48,000 high school students, who saw four plays each year after reading the plays in class. The productions included guest actors, such as Havoc, who portrayed Mrs. Malaprop in The Rivals, and also lectured in the schools.

After President Richard M. Nixon took office in January 1969, the federal funding ended. The Repertory Theatre sought to become self-sustaining and hired Havoc as the artistic director. She created a theater in a vacant 100-year-old synagogue, constructing a thrust stage with audience members seated on three sides. She also established an apprentice program for teenagers, an acting school, and a space for an African American theater group. Havoc was able to lure well-known actors to participate in productions, such as Julie Harris and Jessica Walter in The Women. After the 1970 season, Havoc resigned due to budgetary limitations. Her farewell production in November 1970 was The Skin of Our Teeth, with Havoc portraying Sabina and at age 58, performing on a trapeze 60 feet (18 m) above the audience.

In the fall of 1982, Havoc became the eighth and final actress to portray the featured role of the villainous "Miss Hannigan" in the long-running original Broadway production of the musical Annie. She continued in the role until the show closed after more than four years on January 2, 1983. In 1995, she made her last New York stage appearance at age 82 as the title character in The Old Lady’s Guide to Survival at the Off-Broadway Lamb's Theatre. Her performance was cited as one of the season's five best by an actress in a primary role by the editors of The Best Plays of 1994–1995. At age 88, Havoc starred with Dick Cavett in the Tennessee Williams one-act play Lifeboat Drill as part of the January 26, 2002, fourth Tennessee Williams marathon at the Hartford Stage Company.

=== Television and radio ===
Havoc performed intermittently on the radio in the 1940s and early 1950s. Her performances ranged from full-length plays, such as Golden Boy on the prestigious Theater Guild on the Air and Skylark on NBC Best Plays, to the more popular mystery program Suspense. Under the pseudonym Armana Fargey, she also appeared on episodes of The Adventures of Sam Spade and Suspense.

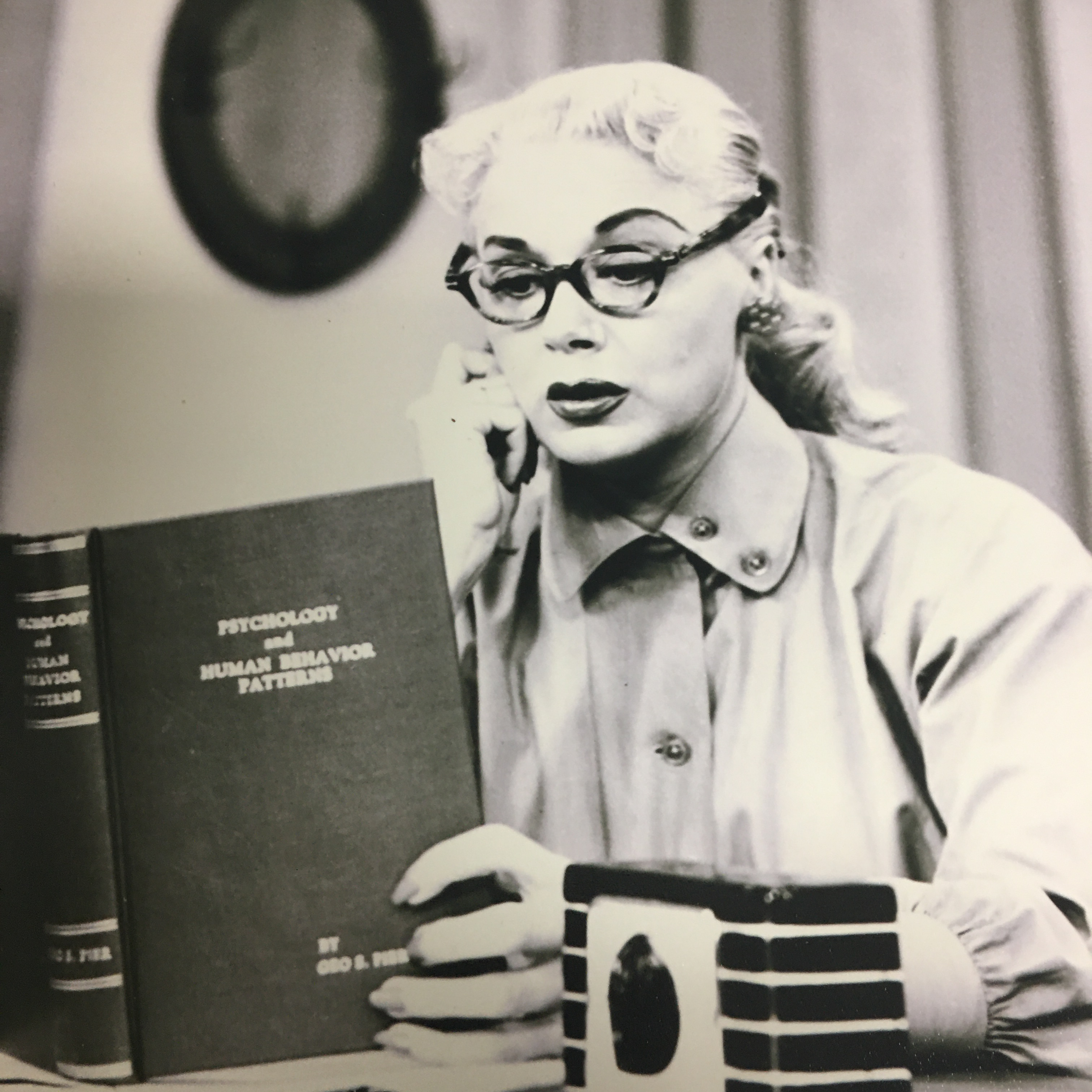
June Havoc in Willy in 1954

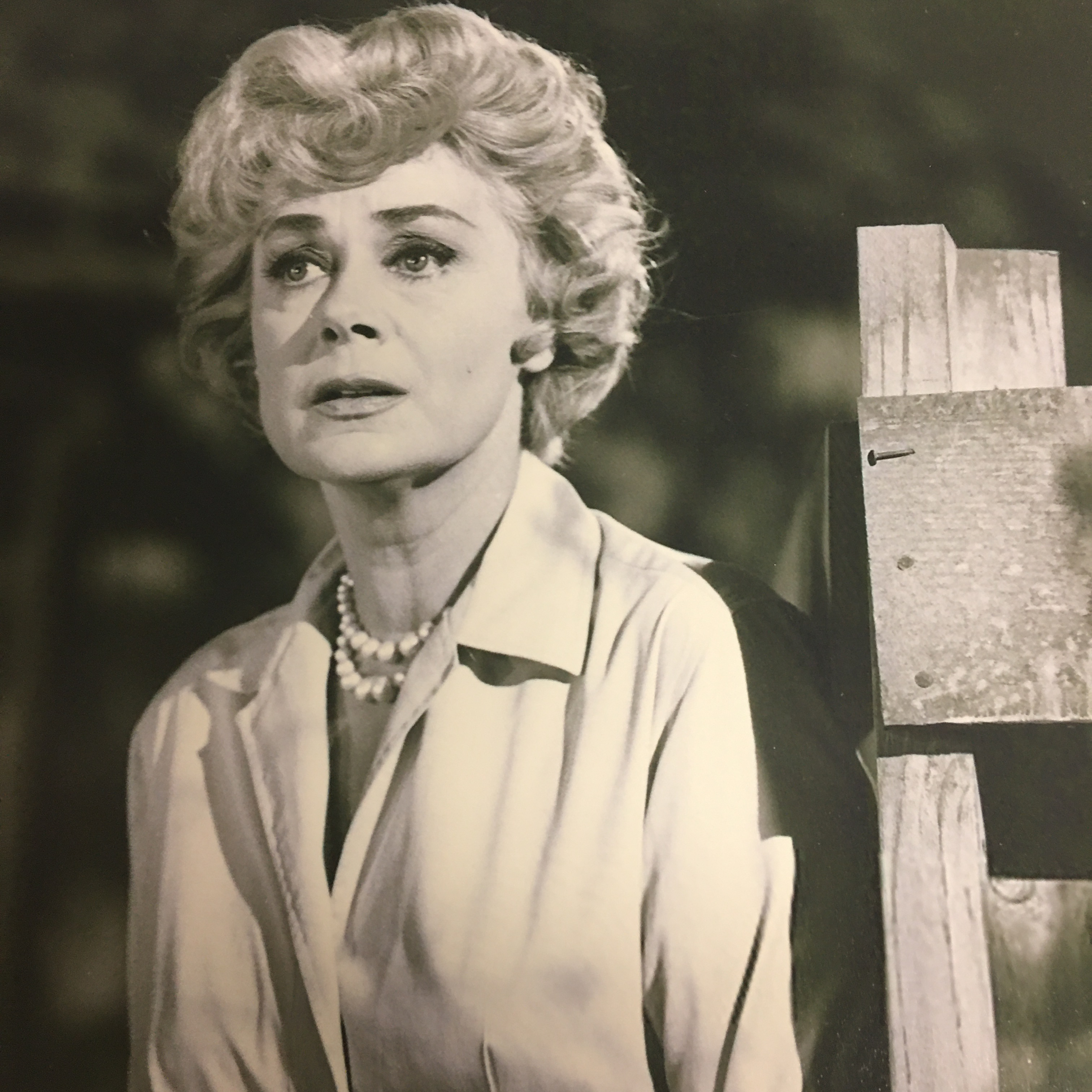
June Havoc in an episode of The Outer Limits in 1964

In the 1950s, Havoc was a frequent performer on anthology television series, both filmed, such as General Electric Theater, and live, such as the Peabody Award-winning Celanese Theatre, the Emmy Award-winning Robert Montgomery Presents and Omnibus. She starred in a weekly half hour series Willy during the 1954–1955 television season. In some respects, the show was ahead of its time in that Havoc's character, Willa “Willy” Dodger, was an unmarried lawyer with her own legal practice in a small New England town. Lucille Ball had encouraged her to star in a weekly series, and the show was a Desilu production. Like I Love Lucy, Willy was filmed before a live studio audience. Her husband, William Spier, was the producer. Willy was broadcast on CBS at 10:30 p.m. on Saturdays opposite the popular NBC series, Your Hit Parade. Midway through the season, an attempt was made to increase ratings by having Havoc's character relocate to New York to represent show business clients; however, the show lasted only one season.

From the 1960s through 1990, Havoc appeared occasionally on such successful television series as The Untouchables; Murder, She Wrote; McMillan & Wife; The Paper Chase; and The Outer Limits, as well as an arc on the popular soap opera General Hospital.

== Personal life ==
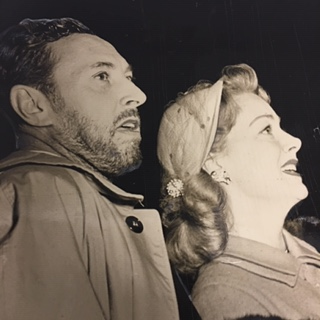
June Havoc and her husband William Spier attending the races in 1951

Havoc was married three times. Her first marriage, at age 16, was in December 1928 to Bobby Reed, a boy dancer in her vaudeville act. Her second marriage was to Donald S. Gibbs in 1936; they divorced in December 1942. Her third marriage, to radio and television director and producer William Spier, lasted from January 25, 1948 until his death in 1973. Havoc's sister Gypsy Rose Lee died of lung cancer in 1970, aged 59, and is interred at Inglewood Park Cemetery in Inglewood, California. June's only child was a daughter, April Rose Hyde, born April 2, 1932. A marriage license, dated November 30, 1928 for Ellen Hovick and Weldon Hyde would seem to indicate that Bobby Reed's real name was Weldon Hyde. However, in her second memoir More Havoc, Havoc admitted that her daughter's father was Jamie Smythe, a marathon dance promoter. This suggestion seems credible since she had separated from her first husband before she entered her first marathon dance contest in 1933. April became an actress known as April Kent in the 1950s, appearing in such films as The Incredible Shrinking Man and Tammy and the Bachelor. April pre-deceased her mother, dying in the Paris suburb of Montreuil, Seine-Saint-Denis on December 28, 1998, at the age of 66.

In 1947, Havoc was a member of the Committee for the First Amendment (“the FAC”), founded by Philip Dunne, Myrna Loy, John Huston and William Wyler, to support freedom of speech in the film industry during the hearings of the House Un-American Activities Committee (''HUAC'') . HUAC was conducting an investigation of Communist infiltration of the film industry prompted in part by the films Crossfire and Gentleman's Agreement, in which antisemitism was a focal point. Havoc had played the supporting role of a secretary who is Jewish but also expresses anti-Semitic sentiments in the latter film. On October 26, Havoc boarded a chartered plane with 22 other FAC members, including Humphrey Bogart, Lauren Bacall and Danny Kaye, to Washington, D.C. to protest and attend the second week of hearings. The FAC also sponsored two network radio broadcasts, Hollywood Fights Back, on October 26, and November 2, 1947, in which Havoc and 44 other members voiced their opposition to the HUAC hearings and the existence of the committee itself.

The FAC members, including Havoc, walked to the Capitol and attended the October 27 hearing. The members were escorted past empty seats to the back of the hearing room where Rep. J. Parnell Thomas, the HUAC chairman, had reserved seats for them. They were treated to a raucous confrontation between Thomas and the subpoenaed witness, screenwriter John Howard Lawson. Lawson refused to answer whether he had ever been a member of the Communist Party and was held in contempt; evidence, including Lawson’s Communist party membership card, was then introduced. Although the FAC members had planned to attend only one day of the hearings, they stayed a second day before returning to Los Angeles. On October 30, Thomas abruptly ended the hearings without calling several subpoenaed witnesses to the relief of the film industry. However, he threatened to reconvene the hearings. Moreover, the committee had held 10 screenwriters and directors in contempt and introduced their Communist Party membership cards into evidence. Moreover, the FAC members’ trip to Congress proved to be a public relations fiasco. The general public perceived the FAC members as supporting the proven Communist Party members, not their freedom of speech. As a result, movie box office receipts dropped 20%, and even established stars like Bogart were compelled to make public apologies. It is unknown whether Havoc’s film career was affected. However, the fact that she had prominent roles in three films in 1948 and three films in 1949 would suggest otherwise. One of her 1948 films was The Iron Curtain, which was an anti-communist movie produced by Daryl F. Zanuck in response to Thomas’ claims that Hollywood did not produce such films.

June Havoc at her development Cannon Crossing c. 1980

In 1967, Havoc founded Youthbridge, a program that provided theatrical training to adolescents, primarily African American adolescents, at the Bridgeport, Connecticut YWCA. She was the executive and artistic director of the Youthbridge program and participated in fund raising events.

In the mid-1970s, Havoc purchased for $230,000 an abandoned train depot and various pre-Civil War buildings on eight acres of land called Cannon Crossing in the Cannondale Historic District of Wilton, Connecticut. Restoring, rebuilding and re-purposing several small buildings from other locations, she worked hands-on and successfully completed this vast restoration project, which remains a popular destination today. It is home to artisan shops, galleries, boutiques, a cafe and a restaurant. Havoc sold the enclave in 1989. A long-time resident of Fairfield County (Weston, Wilton and lastly North Stamford) Connecticut, Havoc was fiercely devoted to the care and well-being of animals. Her homes were a nurturing and loving sanctuary to many orphaned geese, donkeys, cats, and dogs over the decades. Havoc set aside half of the acreage at Cannon Crossing for rescued animals, and Blessing of the Animals ceremonies were held annually just before Christmas at Cannon Crossing.

== Death ==
Havoc died at her home in Stamford, Connecticut, on March 28, 2010, from unspecified natural causes. She was believed to be 97 at the time of her death.

== Honors ==
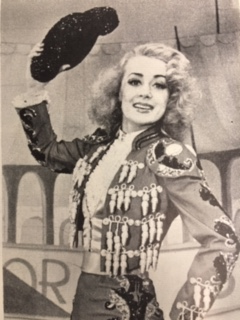
June Havoc in Mexican Hayride in 1943.

Havoc received the Donaldson Award for best supporting actress in a musical comedy (Mexican Hayride) in the 1943–1944 Broadway season.

In 1960, Havoc was honored with two stars on the Hollywood Walk of Fame—one at 6618 Hollywood Boulevard for her contributions to the motion picture industry, and the other at 6413 Hollywood Boulevard for television.

Havoc was nominated for the Tony Award for Best Direction of a Play in 1964 for Marathon '33, which she wrote.

In 1971, Havoc received a Humanitarian Award from Bridgeport University, Bridgeport, Connecticut.

For her performance in Habeas Corpus, Havoc was nominated for the Drama Desk Award for best supporting actress in a play for the 1975–76 Broadway season.

In 2000, Havoc was inducted into the American Theatre Hall of Fame.

== Legacy ==
The June Havoc Theatre, housed at the Abingdon Theatre in New York City, was named for her in 2003.

Havoc was the first American woman nominated for a Tony Award for direction of a play.

In his autobiography Original Story, Arthur Laurents reports that June Havoc refused to sign a release for any claim regarding the content of the musical Gypsy. Havoc demanded that his script state that she was age 13 when she left the vaudeville act and eloped with one of the dancers. Laurents explains that he objected to Havoc's demand because the audience would lose any sympathy for the character of her mother Rose. He indicates that, while the musical was in tryouts out of town, he altered the script, changing the name of Havoc's character from Dainty June to Dainty Claire. He states that as a result, Havoc signed the release, and her character's name was restored to Dainty June.

In her one-woman show, Elaine Stritch at Liberty, Elaine Stritch recalled that after the closing of the play Time of the Barracudas on the West Coast, she returned to New York and landed a leading role in the play Oh Glorious Tintinnabulation. Stritch recounted that the play was written and directed by June Havoc and scheduled for performance at the Lincoln Center Theater. According to Stritch, during dress rehearsal, Havoc told Stritch that "it just wasn't working out." Stritch added that she went home and that Havoc assumed the role she had been playing. She noted that this incident resulted in an article by Lee Israel, in which Stritch criticized directors, published in The New York Times, which led to her casting in the musical Company.

Havoc's papers are held in the Howard Gotlieb Archival Research Center at Boston University, and a 28-page inventory is accessible online.

== Selected stage work ==
(All shows on Broadway unless indicated otherwise.)

=== Acting ===
- The Merry Widow (1936) Malita – St Louis Municipal Theatre
- Bittersweet (1936) Dolly Chamberlain – St Louis Municipal Theatre
- Forbidden Melody (1936)
- The Three Waltzes (1938) Lilli – Jones Beach Stadium
- Words and Music (1940–41) The National Theatre national tour
- Pal Joey (1941) Gladys Bumps with Gene Kelly
- Mexican Hayride (1944) Montana
- Sadie Thompson (1944) Sadie Thompson
- The Ryan Girl (1945) Venetia Ryan
- Dream Girl (1946)
- Dunnigan's Daughter (1946) Ferne Rainier – John Golden Theatre
- Affairs of State (1951) Irene Elliott (replacing Celeste Holm)
- Devil On Two Sticks (1955) Salt Creek Summer Theatre, Hinsdale, IL
- One Foot in the Door (1957) Schubert Theatre Boston try-out
- The Infernal Machine (1958) – Queen Jocasta – Phoenix Theatre
- A Midsummer Night's Dream (1958) Titania – American Shakespeare Festival Theater & Academy
- The Beaux' Stratagem (1959) Mrs. Sullen – Phoenix Theatre
- The Warm Peninsula (1959) Joanne de Lynn – Helen Hayes Theatre
- The Skin of Our Teeth (1960) Sabina – National Theatre The Theatre Guild American Repertory Company
- The Miracle Worker (1960) Kate Keller – National Theatre The Theatre Guild American Repertory Company
- Dinner at Eight (1966) Millicent Jordan with Walter Pidgeon
- A Delicate Balance (1967) Claire – Philadelphia
- The Rivals (1968) Mrs. Malaprop – The Repertory Theatre, New Orleans
- Don Juan in Hell (1968) – Philadelphia
- The Killing of Sister George (1968) June Buckridge (Sister George) – Philadelphia
- Black Comedy/White Lies (1968) – Mineola Theatre
- The Threepenny Opera (1970) Jenny Diver – The Repertory Theatre, New Orleans
- The Skin Of Our Teeth (1970) Sabina – Repertory Theatre, New Orleans
- The Gingerbread Lady (1972) Evy Meara – Pheasant Run Playhouse
- I, Said the Fly (1973) – Big Gurn – Guthrie Theater, Minneapolis
- Habeas Corpus (1975) Mrs. Swabb
- Come And Be Killed (1978) – Berkshire Playhouse
- Jitters (1981) (pre-Broadway try-out)
- Sweeney Todd: The Demon Barber of Fleet Street (1981–82) Mrs. Nellie Lovett – National Tour
- Annie (1982–83) Miss Agatha Hannigan
- An Unexpected Evening with June Havoc (or Baby June Remembers) (1983) one woman show – White Barn Theater, Westport, Connecticut
- An Unexpected Evening with June Havoc (or Baby June Remembers) (1985) one woman show – Donmar Theatre (now Donmar Warehouse), London
- Happy Birthday, Mr. Abbott, or Night of 100 Years (June 22, 1987) (Broadway benefit concert celebrating the 100th birthday of George Abbott)
- Eleemosynary (1991) Dorothea with Elizabeth Ashley directed by Burt Reynolds Flat Rock Theater North Carolina
- The Old Lady's Guide to Survival (1994) – Ivanhoe Theatre, Chicago
- The Old Lady's Guide to Survival (1995) – Lamb's Theatre

=== Directing ===
- The Naked Genius with Gypsy Rose Lee (1954) New Parsons Theatre, Hartford, CT
- Marathon '33 (1963)
- Royal Flush (1965) (pre-Broadway tryout)
- A Delicate Balance (1967) Westport Country Playhouse
- A Delicate Balance (1967) Mineola Theatre & Tappan Zee Playhouse
- Black Comedy / White Lies (1968) Mineola Theatre
- I, Said The Fly (1973) Guthrie Theater, Minneapolis
- Oh Glorious Tintinnabulation (1974) The Actors Studio

Artistic Director of The Repertory Theatre, New Orleans (1970)

- The Threepenny Opera (1970) The Repertory Theatre, New Orleans
- Luv (1970) The Repertory Theatre, New Orleans
- The Fantasticks (1970) The Repertory Theatre, New Orleans
- The Women (1970), with Julie Harris and Jessica Walter, The Repertory Theatre, New Orleans
- A Streetcar Named Desire (1970), with Ben Piazza, The Repertory Theatre, New Orleans
- The Skin Of Our Teeth (1970) The Repertory Theatre, New Orleans

== Selected filmography ==
=== Features ===
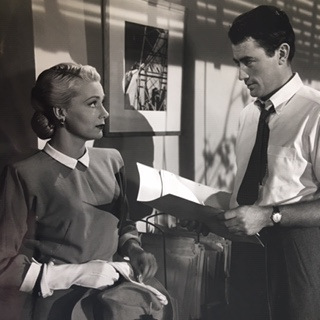
June Havoc and Gregory Peck in Gentleman's Agreement in 1947

=== Features ===
Year	Title	Role	Notes
1942	Four Jacks and a Jill	Opal	
1942	Sing Your Worries Away	Roxey Rochelle	
1942	Powder Town	Dolly Smythe	
1942	My Sister Eileen	Effie Shelton	
1943	No Time for Love	Darlene	
1943	Hello, Frisco, Hello	Beulah Clancy	
1943	Hi Diddle Diddle	Leslie Quayle	
1944	Timber Queen	Lil Boggs	
1944	Casanova in Burlesque	Lillian Colman	
1945	Brewster's Millions	Trixie Summers	
1947	Intrigue	Mme. Tamara Baranoff	
1947	Gentleman's Agreement	Elaine Wales	
1948	The Iron Curtain	Nina Karanova	
1948	When My Baby Smiles at Me	Gussie Evans	
1949	Red, Hot and Blue	Sandra	
1949	Chicago Deadline	Leona Purdy	
1949	The Story of Molly X	Molly X	
1950	Mother Didn't Tell Me	Maggie Roberts	
1950	Once a Thief	Margie Foster	
1951	Follow the Sun	Norma	
1952	Lady Possessed	Jean Wilson	
1956	Three for Jamie Dawn	Lorrie Delacourt	
1977	The Private Files of J. Edgar Hoover	Hoover's Mother	
1980	Can't Stop the Music	Helen Morell	
1987	A Return to Salem's Lot	Aunt Clara	
2003	Broadway: The Golden Age, by the Legends Who Were There	Herself	Documentary

=== Short subjects ===
Year	Title	Role
1918	On the Jump	Child
1918	Hey There!	Child
1942	Hedda Hopper's Hollywood No. 6	Herself

== Selected television work ==
- The Milton Berle Show (1949) herself
- Robert Montgomery Presents ("The Egg And I" 1950) – Betty MacDonald
- Cameo Theatre ("Special Delivery" 1951)
- Somerset Maugham TV Theatre ("Cakes And Ale" 1951)
- The Fred Waring Show (September 9, 1951) - herself
- Celanese Theatre ("Anna Christie" June 23, 1952) – Anna Christie with Richard Burton
- Pulitzer Prize Playhouse ("Daisy Mayme" 1952) – Daisy Mayme Plunkett
- Robert Montgomery Presents ("The Fairifield Lady" 1952)
- Omnibus (American TV series) ("Three Maidens and the Devil / Happy Birthday, Aunt Sarah" 1953)
- Omnibus (American TV series) ("The Man in the Cool Cool Moon /The Bear" 1953) – Mme. Papova
- What's My Line? January 18, 1953 (as Mystery Guest)
- The Name's the Same January 27, 1953 (as Guest)
- Medallion Theatre ("Mrs. Union Station" 1953)
- General Electric Theater ("Exit For Margo" 1954) – Margo
- Fireside Theatre ("A Mother's Duty" 1954)
- Willy (1954–1955) – Willa 'Willy' Dodger
- Robert Montgomery Presents ("The Tyrant" 1956) – Crystal Davis
- Matinee Theatre (1956) – Robin Daw
- Lux Video Theatre ("Millie's Daughter" (1956) – Millie
- Studio One in Hollywood ("The Mother Bit" 1957) – Kitty Sharpe
- The Errol Flynn Theatre ("Take The High Road" 1957) – Lorraine Gray
- Panic! (The Moth and the Flame" 1957) – June Sullivan
- The Errol Flynn Theatre ("My Infallible Uncle" 1957)
- Kraft Theatre ("Candid Profile, Inc." 1957) – Mary Carpenter
- Producers' Showcase ("Mr. Broadway" 1957) – Trixie Fraganza
- Person to Person (1957) – herself
- The Last Word (CBS weekly show August 16, 1959) – herself
- The U.S. Steel Hour ("The Pink Burro" 1959)
- The Untouchables ("The Larry Fay Story" 1960) – Sally Kansas
- General Hospital (1963)
- The June Havoc Show (1964) (cancelled after a few weeks)
- The Outer Limits ("Cry of Silence" 1964) – Margaret Thorne with Eddie Albert and Arthur Hunnicutt
- Burke's Law ("Who Killed Everybody?" 1964) – Miranda Forsythe
- The Magical World of Disney ("The Boy Who Stole the Elephant" 1970) – Molly Jeffreys
- McMillan and Wife ("The Easy Sunday Murder Case", 1971) – Francesca Fairborn
- Connecticut Profiles (October 23, 1978) - herself
- The Paper Chase ("The Clay Footed Idol" 1979) – Mrs. Margaret Peters
- Search for Tomorrow (cast member in 1986) – Zophie
- Murder, She Wrote ("The Days Dwindle Down" 1987) – Thelma Vantay
- Murder, She Wrote ("The Grand Old Lady", 1989) – Lady Abigail Austin
- General Hospital (1990) – Madeline Markham
- American Masters ("Vaudeville" 1997) – herself
- Great Performances ("The Rodgers & Hart Story: Thou Swell, Thou Witty" 1999) – herself

== Selected radio work ==
- Theatre Guild on the Air ("Golden Boy" 1946) – Lorna
- Theatre Guild on the Air ("They Knew What They Wanted" May 19, 1946) – Amy with John Garfield
- Suspense ("Stand-In" June 12, 1947)
- Suspense ("Double Ugly" August 28, 1947)
- Hollywood Fights Back (October 26, 1947) herself
- Suspense ("Subway" October 30, 1947)
- Hollywood Fights Back (November 2, 1947) herself
- Suspense ("Riabouchinska" November 13, 1947) narrator under the pseudonym Armana Fargey
- Suspense ("One Hundred in the Dark" November 20, 1947)
- Suspense ("Wet Saturday" December 19, 1947)
- Suspense ("Black Angel" / "Eve" January 24, 1948)
- Suspense ("Blind Date" September 29, 1949)
- Cavalcade of America ("The Reluctant Pioneer" April 3, 1951)
- NBC Best Plays ("Skylark" 1952)

== Recordings ==
- Mexican Hayride ("Abracadabra" b/w "There Must Be Someone for Me") Decca 71955 / 23338A (78 rpm record 1944)
- Mexican Hayride (original Broadway cast album) Decca album no. A 372 (four 78 rpm records 1944)
- Co-Star: Record Acting Game Columbia Records CS-105 (33 rpm lp record)
- Hello, Frisco, Hello (motion picture soundtrack) Sandy Hook Records S.H.2070 (33 rpm lp record 1983)
- Mexican Hayride Decca Broadway B003125-02-STO1 (original cast album cd)
- Cole Porter's Can-Can / Mexican Hayride / The Pirate Naxos Musicals 8.120845 (original cast selections cd 2007)
- Alice Faye & Co-Stars: The 20th Century Fox Years, vol.2, 1940-1944 Sepia Recordings 5055122113775 (film soundtrack recordings, including songs by June Havoc in Hello, Frisco, Hello cd 2023)

== Literary works ==
=== Plays ===
- Marathon '33 (1963)
- I, Said The Fly (1973)
- Oh Glorious Tintinnabulation (1974) book and lyrics by June Havoc and music by Cathy MacDonald
- An Unexpected Evening with June Havoc (or Baby June Remembers) (1983) one woman show

=== Books ===
- Early Havoc (Simon and Schuster 1959)
- More Havoc (Harper & Row Publishers 1980)
- Suspense: Twenty Years of Thrills and Chills by Martin Grams with foreword by June Havoc (Morris Publishing 1997)
