= Raul Roulien =

Brazilian actor, singer, screenwriter and film director

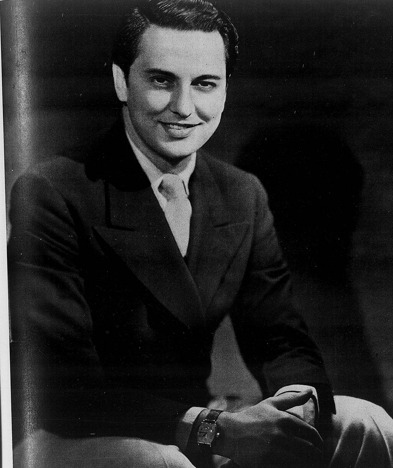
- Born: Raul Salvador Intini Pepe; 7 October 1904; Rio de Janeiro, Brazil
- Died: 8 September 2000 (aged 95); São Paulo, Brazil
- Other name: Salvador Intini
- Occupations: Actor; singer; screenwriter; film director
- Years active: 1928–1970
- Spouses: Abigail Maia (m. 1928; div. 1930) Diva Tosca (m. 1932; died 1933) Conchita Montenegro (m. 1935; div. 1937) Nelly Rodrigues (m. 1950)

Raul Salvador Intini Pepe Roulien (7 October 1904 – 8 September 2000), known professionally as Raul Roulien, was a Brazilian actor, singer, screenwriter and film director. He is widely considered the first male Brazilian star in Hollywood.

He worked briefly in Hollywood in the waning days of the American movies' embrace of the "Latin lover" (a title invented for the Italian actor Rudolph Valentino), a phenomenon that encouraged the Jewish-American actor Jacob Krantz to change his name to Ricardo Cortez.

Raul began recording in 1928 and grew in reputation as a theater actor and composer as well, being the greatest Brazilian heartthrob of his time. That same year, he formed the theatrical company Abigail Maia-Raul Roulien, with then wife, actress Abigail Maia, authoring a genre called "frivolity theater", which were quick shows that took place between breaks in the cinema.

In 1931, at the age of 29, with his talent and good looks, he went to the United States and was signed to Fox Studios, where he worked between 1931 and 1934. His career spanned a total of 18 films, including Delicious (1931) and Flying Down to Rio (1933), the latter starring Fred Astaire and Ginger Rogers in their first dance together.

In 1933 his second wife, Diva Tosca (née Tosca Izabel Querze), was hit and killed as a pedestrian on Sunset Boulevard by John Huston.

== Life and career ==
Raul Roulien was born Raul Salvador Intini Pepe on 7 October 1904, in Rio de Janeiro, Brazil to Italian immigrants Biagio Pepe and Anna Intini. As a child, he used to sing all the time. He started his artistic career at age eight, as Raul Pepe, and he is reported to have performed to then President of Brazil Rodrigues Alves and to Brazilian writer, and his godfather, Ruy Barbosa.

While visiting one of his brothers in Buenos Aires, Argentina, he was hired to sing at Cine Porteño. There, he rose to fame as a chansonier, a pianist and a composer, and began to pursue a career in the theater. In 1928, back in Brazil, he founded the "Abigail Maya-Raul Roulien Theater Company", with then wife, actress Abigail Maia, and created a performance genre called "Theater of Frivolity," which were quick shows that took place between movie sessions.

In 1931, divorced from Abigail, he went to New York and was signed to Fox Studios, as an actor, where he worked until 1934. He made his debut in a Spanish-language version of the 1931 Hollywood film Charlie Chan Carries On, called There Were Thirteen (1931). His second movie was Delicious (1931), directed by David Butler, where Roulien played a Russian composer, and sang "Delishious", written by George Gershwin. In 1932, he starred in Careless Lady, State's Attorney, and The Painted Woman; and in 1933, in No Dejes la Puerta Abierta, El Último Varon Sobre La Tierra, and It's Great to Be Alive. That same year, he starred in the movie for which he is best remembered, Flying Down to Rio, as part of a romantic triangle with Gene Raymond and Dolores del Río, and for singing "Orchids in the Moonlight". The production is also memorable for featuring the first Fred Astaire/Ginger Rogers cinematic pairing.

== Stage and film work ==
=== Films ===
Year	Title	Role	Notes	Ref.
1931	There Were Thirteen	Max Minchin		
1931	Delicious	Sascha	Singing "Delishious"	
1932	Careless Lady	Luis Pareda		
1932	State's Attorney	Señor Alvarado	Uncredited	
1932	The Painted Woman	Jim Kikela		
1933	El Último Varon Sobre La Tierra	Ralph Martin		
1933	Primavera en otoño	Juan Manuel Valladres		
1933	It's Great to Be Alive	Carlos Martin		
1933	No Dejes la Puerta Abierta	Raul		
1933	Flying Down to Rio	Julio Ribeiro	First Fred Astaire / Ginger Rogers pairing Singing "Orchids in the Moonlight"	
1934	Granaderos del Amor	Erich Remberg / Pierre Laval		
1934	The World Moves On	Carlos Girard (1825) / Henri Girard (1914)		
1935	Asegure a Su Mujer	Ricardo Randall		
1935	Piernas de Seda	Frank Alton		
1935	Te Quiero Con Locura	Alberto Foster		
1937	O Grito da Mocidade	Raul Melo		
1939	El Grito de la Juventud		Director	
1939	Aves Sem Ninho		Director	
1947	Road to Rio	Cavalry Officer	Uncredited, (final film role)	
1948	Asas do Brasil		Story, screenwriter, director	

=== Stage ===
Production	Year	Theater	Note(s)	Ref(s)
Malibu	1938	–	Director	
Prometo Ser Infiel	1941	Teatro-Cassino Copacabana	Also director and translator	
Patinho de Ouro	1941	Teatro-Cassino Copacabana	Also director	
Garçon	1941	Teatro-Cassino Copacabana	Also director	
Alguns Abaixo de Zero	1941	Teatro Boa Vista	Also director	
Trio em Lá Menor	1941	Teatro Boa Vista	Also writer and director	
Diana, Eu Te Amo	1941	Teatro Boa Vista	Also director	
Coração	1941	Teatro Boa Vista	Also writer and director	
Na Pele do Lobo	1942	Teatro Regina	Also director and translator	

== Bibliography ==
- Aubrey Solomon. The Fox Film Corporation, 1915-1935: A History and Filmography. McFarland, 2011.
