= Red, Hot and Blue (film) =

1949 film by John Farrow

- Theatrical release poster
- Directed by: John Farrow
- Written by: Hagar Wilde; John Farrow
- Story by: Charles Lederer
- Produced by: Robert Fellows; John Farrow
- Starring: Betty Hutton; Victor Mature
- Cinematography: Daniel L. Fapp
- Edited by: Eda Warren
- Music by: Frank Loesser (songs)
- Production company: Paramount Pictures
- Distributed by: Paramount Pictures
- Release date: October 19, 1949 (New York City)
- Running time: 84 minutes
- Country: United States
- Language: English
- Box office: $1.5 million

Red, Hot and Blue is a 1949 American musical comedy crime film directed by John Farrow. The film stars Betty Hutton and Victor Mature, with William Demarest, June Havoc, Jane Nigh, Frank Loesser, William Talman, Art Smith, Raymond Walburn, Onslow Stevens and Joseph Vitale. Produced and released by Paramount Pictures, Loesser makes his film debut as gangster Hair-Do-Lempke. Loesser also wrote the songs.

Despite sharing the same name, the film is not based on, nor has any connection to Cole Porter's play, Red, Hot and Blue. The film is instead based on various stories by Broadway columnists.

The film stars Hutton as Eleanor "Yum-Yum" Collier, an aspiring young actress and Mature as Danny James, her serious boyfriend. Eleanor gets mixed up with gangsters Bunny Harris, played by Talman, and Hair-Do-Lempke, played by Loesser, in her pursuit of fame.

== Plot ==
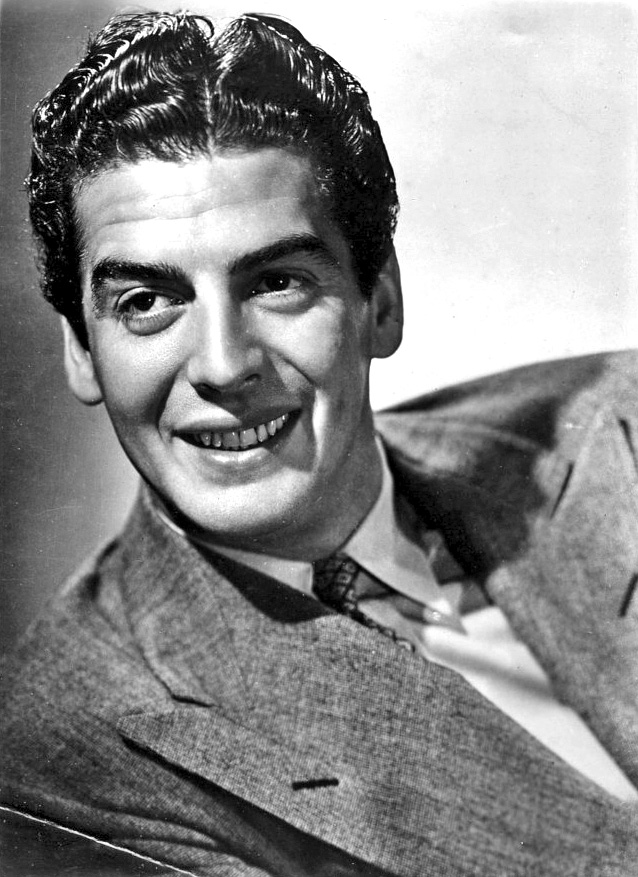
Victor Mature

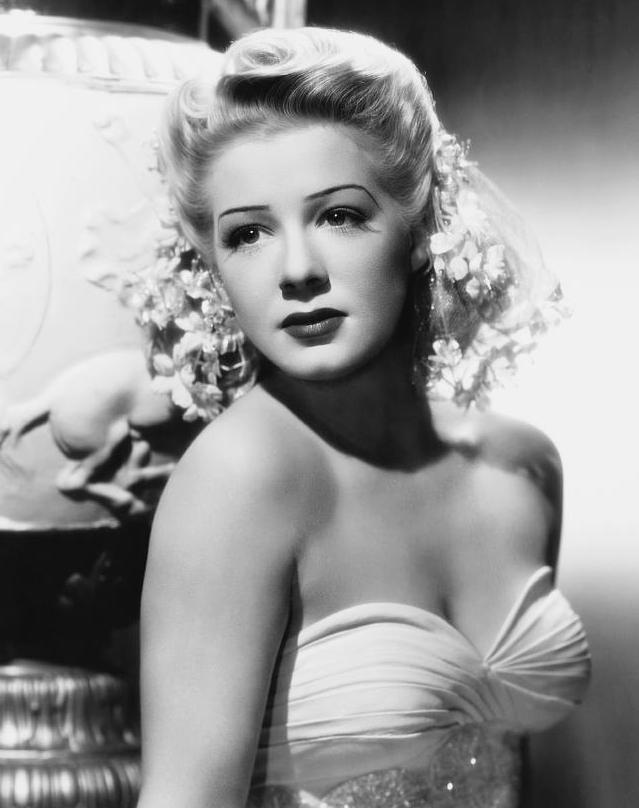
Betty Hutton

Twenty-three-year-old aspiring actress Eleanor Collier finds herself being interrogated by a band of gangsters led by Hair-Do-Lempke. Lempke and his gang want to know who murdered Eleanor’s to-be producer on Broadway, Bunny Harris, who in reality is a racketeer. Eleanor confesses she doesn’t know who murdered Bunny, but Lempke doesn’t believe her, so Eleanor starts to explain the last six-months of her life to buy time until help arrives.

Eleanor has recently moved to New York City from Ohio to pursue an acting career on Broadway. She shares her apartment with Angelica and Sandra, who are frequently annoyed by Eleanor’s liveliness. Eleanor’s apartment is just up the stairs from Danny James, her boyfriend’s, apartment. Danny is the director of a small theatre group, of which Eleanor is a member. He is constantly aghast at Eleanor’s lack of focus and her desire for money and fame. He also disapproves of Eleanor’s agent, Charlie Baxter, who calls her "Yum Yum". Charlie promptly sets her up on a date with a wealthy, yet unbeknownst to Eleanor, married man, Alex Creek, in hopes that he’ll finance her career.

Alex takes Eleanor to an elite club. Unfamiliar with high society, when Eleanor is given a cocktail, she drinks it all immediately. She quickly becomes drunk and causes a massive scene at the club, which culminates in Creek’s wife arriving and accusing her of infidelity, which results in a fight between the two women.

The next day, Eleanor and Danny go out to a restaurant to celebrate Danny’s theatre group being selected for a prestigious Broadway program, of which Eleanor will be the lead. Gangster Bunny Harris is also at the restaurant. He notices Eleanor and introduces himself as a Broadway producer. Eleanor invites Bunny to attend Danny’s theatre group’s rehearsal, an offer which he accepts. At the rehearsal, noticing Bunny’s disinterest, Eleanor steps in and spices up the performance, earning Bunny’s ‘interest’ but the disapproval of everyone else, including the real Broadway producers. The Broadway producers now plan to remove Eleanor from the show. Danny decides to propose to Eleanor but she refuses. Eleanor cites the producers decision to replace her and she quits Danny’s theatre group.

A disheartened Eleanor returns to her apartment. Sandra advises Eleanor to read a script at Bunny’s apartment. Eleanor agrees but when she arrives at Bunny’s apartment, he refuses to let her leave. Suddenly, a masked intruder enters Bunny’s apartment and shoots him.

Eleanor subsequently finds herself being questioned by the police, who tell Eleanor about Bunny’s real career. After much questioning, Eleanor returns to her apartment. Gangster and Pianist Hair-Do-Lempke knocks at her door. Eleanor, expecting reporters, opens the door, allowing Lempke and his gang to abduct her.

Before she is dragged off, Eleanor is permitted to use the bathroom. She uses lipstick to write on the ironing board a short description of Lempke, including that he plays the piano, alongside a cartoonish drawing of his face.

That night, Sandra arrives home to the apartment and finds the ironing board. She informs Danny who gets the drawing of Lempke circulated in newspapers. Danny begins asking local piano tuners if they recognise the man in the drawing. One finally recognizes Lempke’s and points Danny to where Lempke resides. Posing as a piano tuner, Danny is reluctantly allowed into Lempke’s hideout. When the gangsters realise Danny isn’t who he says he is, a fight breaks out between them, and Danny and Eleanor.

After the gangsters are successfully beaten by the couple, Eleanor is re-added to the program as the lead by the producers. Finally, she and Danny decide to marry each other.

== Cast ==
- Betty Hutton as Eleanor ‘Yum-Yum’ Collier
- Victor Mature as Danny James
- William Demarest as Charlie Baxter
- June Havoc as Sandra
- Jane Nigh as Angelica ‘No-No’ Roseanne
- Frank Loesser as Hair-do Lempke
- William Talman as Bunny Harris
- Art Smith as Laddie Corwin
- Raymond Walburn as Alex Ryan Creek
- Onslow Stevens as Captain Allen
- Joseph Vitale as Carr
- Barry Kelley as Lieutenant Gorman (uncredited)
- Jack Kruschen as Steve (uncredited)
- Percy Helton as Mr. Perkins (uncredited)
- Ernö Verebes as Waiter (uncredited)
- Philip Van Zandt as Louie (uncredited)
- Henry Guttman as Frankie (uncredited)
- Don Shelton as Hamlet (uncredited)
- Herschel Daugherty as Laertes (uncredited)
- Dorothy Abbott as The Queen (uncredited)
- Julia Faye as Julia (uncredited)
- John Marchak as Guard (uncredited)

== Soundtrack ==
All the songs were written by Frank Loesser, they are as follows:

- "I Wake Up In The Morning Feeling Fine" — Performed by Betty Hutton
- "That's Loyalty" — Performed by Betty Hutton
- "Hamlet" — Performed by Betty Hutton
- "(Where Are You) Now That I Need You" — Performed by Betty Hutton

Doris Day recorded "(Where Are You) Now That I Need You" with The Mellomen on Columbia Records 38507.

== Production ==
The film was originally called The Broadway Story. It was the second film from Pioneer Pictures, a recently formed independent production company. Charles Lederer wrote the script based on stories provided by such Broadway columnists as Dorothy Kilgallen, Louis Sobol, Danton Walker and Earl Wilson. It was to start filming October 1, 1948, following the production of Pioneer's first film, Kingsblood Royal, based on the novel by Sinclair Lewis. Lloyd Nolan was discussed for the male lead.

However Pioneer ended up selling the project to Paramount Studios in September 1948 as a vehicle for Betty Hutton. Frank Tashlin was hired to rewrite the script. Robert Fellows was to produce and John Farrow to direct. It was Hutton's first film in two years.

The film was retitled Restless Angel. Ray Milland was going to star, but it was decided to loan him out to Fox; his role was taken by Victor Mature, who had just made Samson and Delilah for Paramount. Mature and Hutton had not previously acted together and Paramount hoped this novelty would prove attractive at the box-office.

The title was changed again to Red Hot and Blue. Filming started January 10, 1949.June Havoc was cast after Betty Hutton saw her appear on stage in Rain. Frank Loesser made his acting debut, as a gangster, and wrote four songs. Filming ended in March 1949.

== Release and reception ==
The film premiered at the Paramount Theatre in New York City on October 19, 1949 and was opened by Erskine Hawkins and his Orchestra.

Bosley Crowther of The New York Times wrote that: Betty Hutton's new film, a raggle-taggle slapstick that goes by the title of "Red, Hot and Blue." (Only the title has been borrowed from the Broadway musical of 1936.) But the fellow who wrote the story and the gagsters who fashioned the script have sorely neglected Miss Hutton in eighty-four minutes of desperate need. She is a red-hot performer, but the stuff that she has to do as a light-headed aspirant to Broadway is decidedly lukewarm and blue. Except for a couple of “jump” songs which Frankie Loesser has prepared and a fist-throwing melee at the wind-up, the omnipresent blonde is held to some agonized hand-wringing in this go on the Paramount's screen.

Variety said that: Betty Hutton returns to the type of songs and comedy that first gained her marquee importance. In doing so she gives “Red, Hot and Blue” a better boxoffice shake than it would have without her calculated frenetic tune deliveries and clowning. Business should hit average levels in most situations. The plot combines a number of angles into its story line, covering gangsters, mob killings, embryo thespians and slapstick farcing. It’s a melange of material that jumps from high spot to high spot, managing a reasonable amount of laughs along the way as it covers the story holes with broad treatment.
