= Revenge at Monte Carlo =

1933 film directed by B. Reeves Eason

- Directed by: B. Reeves Eason
- Written by: Frank Fenton; John T. Neville
- Produced by: Fanchon Royer; Ralph M. Like
- Starring: June Collyer; José Crespo; Wheeler Oakman
- Cinematography: Ernest Miller
- Edited by: Jeanne Spencer
- Music by: Lee Zahler
- Production company: Fanchon Royer Pictures
- Distributed by: Mayfair Pictures
- Release date: February 1, 1933
- Running time: 63 minutes
- Country: United States
- Language: English

Revenge at Monte Carlo is a 1933 American pre-Code mystery film directed by B. Reeves Eason and starring June Collyer, José Crespo and Wheeler Oakman. It is also known by the alternative title of Mystery at Monte Carlo.

The film's sets were designed by the art director Paul Palmentola. A separate Spanish-language version Dos noches was also produced.

== Cast ==
- June Collyer as Landra
- José Crespo as Boris Krinsky
- Wheeler Oakman as Spike Maguire
- Dorothy Gulliver as Diane
- Edward Earle as Francisco Hernandez
- Lloyd Ingraham as Luis del Valle
- Clarence Geldart as Mendez
- Lloyd Whitlock as Alba

== Bibliography ==
- Michael R. Pitts. Poverty Row Studios, 1929–1940: An Illustrated History of 55 Independent Film Companies, with a Filmography for Each. McFarland & Company, 2005.
