= Earl Carroll Sketchbook =

1946 film

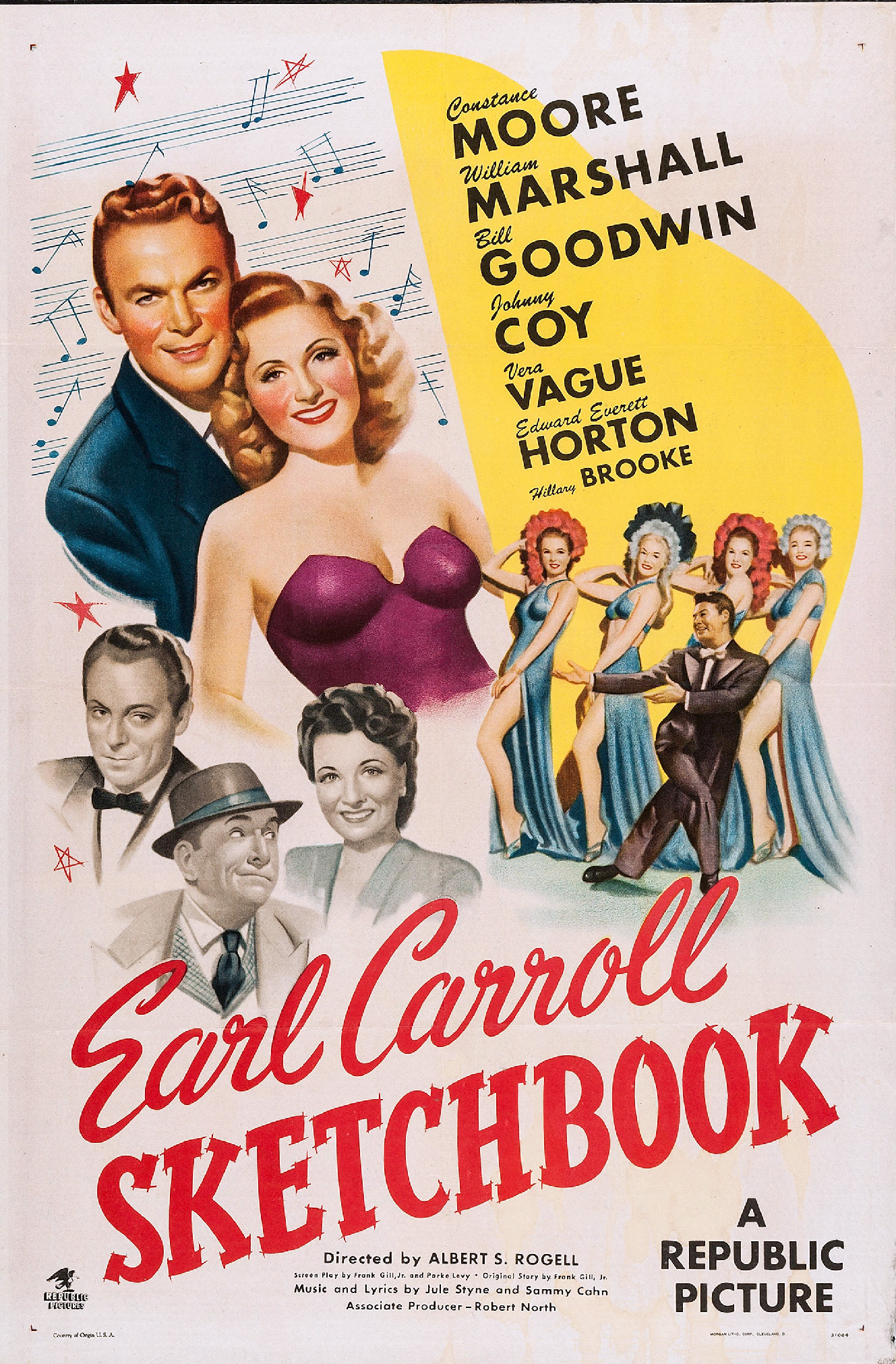
- Theatrical release poster
- Directed by: Albert S. Rogell
- Screenplay by: Frank Gill Jr. Parke Levy
- Story by: Frank Gill Jr.
- Produced by: Robert North
- Starring: Constance Moore; William Marshall; Bill Goodwin; Johnny Coy; Barbara Jo Allen; Edward Everett Horton
- Cinematography: Jack A. Marta
- Edited by: Richard L. Van Enger
- Music by: Nathan Scott
- Production company: Republic Pictures
- Distributed by: Republic Pictures
- Release date: August 22, 1946
- Running time: 90 minutes
- Country: United States
- Language: English

Earl Carroll Sketchbook is a 1946 American musical film directed by Albert S. Rogell and written by Frank Gill Jr. and Parke Levy. The film stars Constance Moore, William Marshall, Bill Goodwin, Johnny Coy, Barbara Jo Allen and Edward Everett Horton. It was released on August 22, 1946 by Republic Pictures.

== Plot ==
Jingle writer Ty Bruce and secretary Pam Thayer have grand ambitions; Ty wishes to become a serious songwriter and Pam a singer. Advertising agent Lynn Stafford tries to attract Ty's romantic interest, while Pam's roommate Sherry Lane offers to help her audition one of Ty's tunes for the Earl Carroll Sketchbook, a big New York revue.

Carroll's stage manager Rick Castle offers Pam a job, liking her voice but also mistakenly believing that she had written the song. After Pam catches Ty kissing Lynn, Pam feigns amnesia. Ty gradually realizes how much he cares for Pam, and both are hired by the revue.

== Cast ==
- Constance Moore as Pamela Thayer
- William Marshall as Tyler Brice
- Bill Goodwin as Rick Castle
- Johnny Coy as Johnny
- Barbara Jo Allen as Sherry Lane
- Edward Everett Horton as Dr. Milo Edwards
- Hillary Brooke as Lynn Stafford
- Dorothy Babb as Babs
- Robert Homans as Pop Edgar
- Ray Walker as Agent Sammy Harris
- Sarah Padden as Mrs. Murphy
- Russell Hicks as John Hawks
- Frances Morris as Nurse
- Bobbie Dorree as Blonde
