= Conchita Montenegro =

Spanish actress, dancer and model (1911–2007)

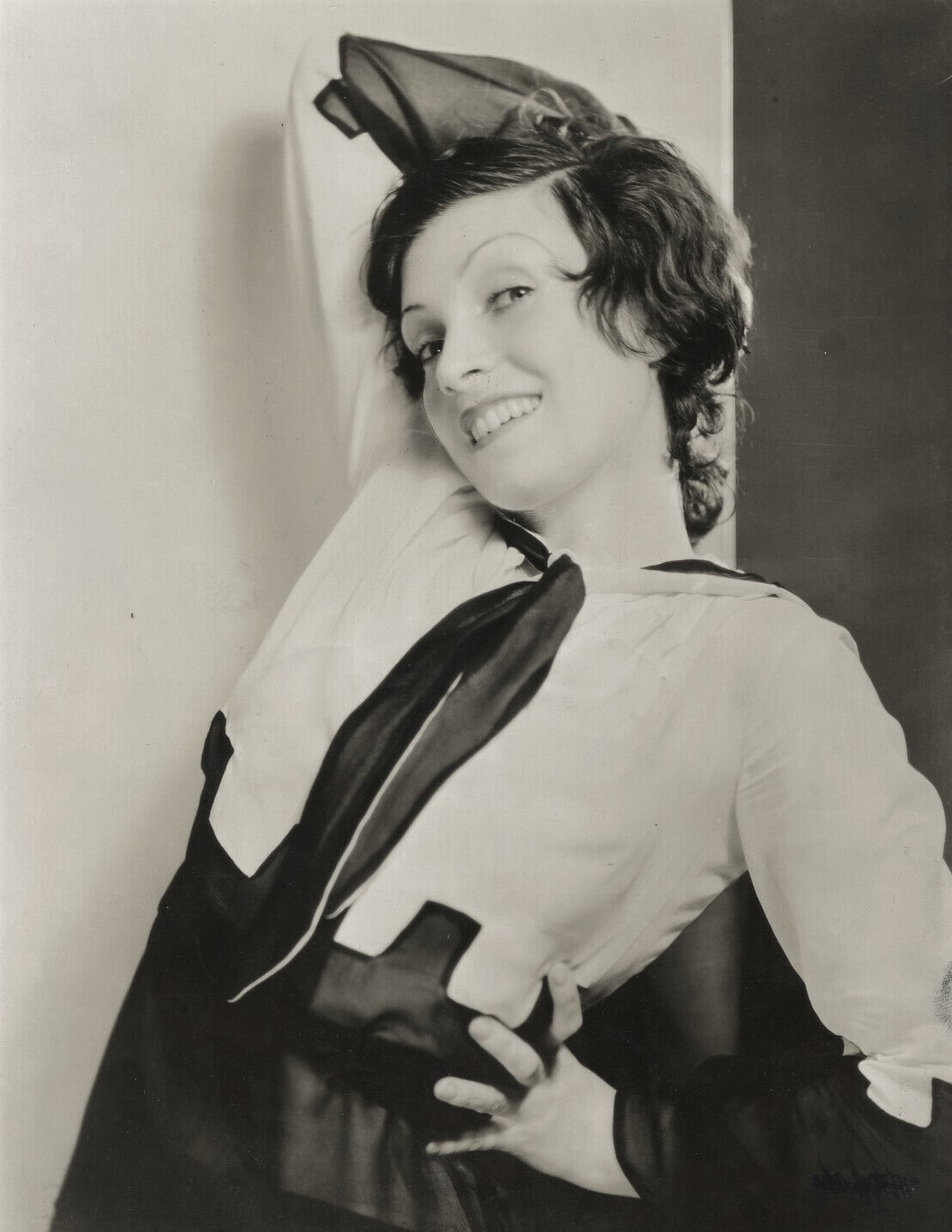
- Montenegro in 1931
- Born: Concepción Andrés Picado; September 11, 1911; San Sebastián, Spain
- Died: April 22, 2007 (aged 95); Madrid, Spain
- Occupations: Actress; singer; dancer
- Years active: 1927–1944
- Spouses: Raul Roulien (m. 1935; div. 1939) Ricardo Giménez Arnau (m. 1944; died 1970)
- Partner: Leslie Howard

Conchita Montenegro (born Concepción Andrés Picado; September 11, 1911 – April 22, 2007) was a Spanish model, dancer, stage and screen actress. She was educated in a convent in Madrid.

== Screen success ==
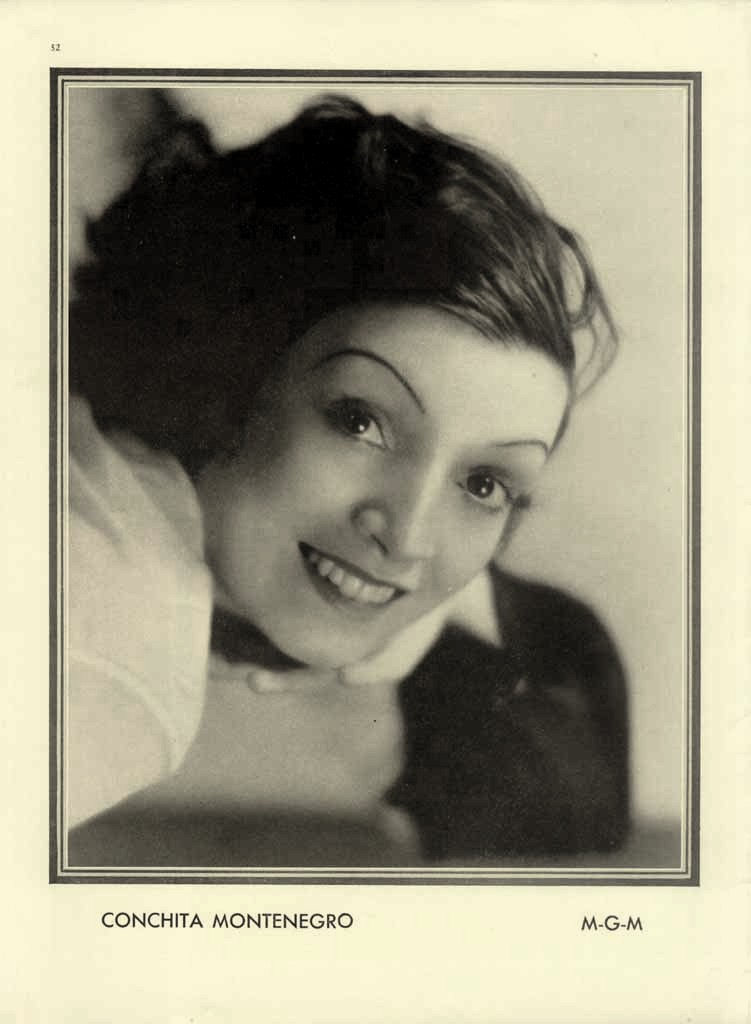
Montenegro in 1930

Montenegro came to Hollywood in June 1930 with a contract at Metro-Goldwyn-Mayer. She was 17 years old and could not speak English; however, in three months time, Montenegro became fluent enough to play the leading female part of Tamea Larrieau, Leslie Howard's love interest in the film Never the Twain Shall Meet (1931). Never the Twain Shall Meet is the English language version of a story written by Peter B. Kyne and was directed by W.S. Van Dyke.

Before this performance, Montenegro had been cast in special Spanish-language versions of MGM movies, such as Call of the Flesh and Love in Every Port (both 1930). The former starred Ramon Novarro, and the latter featured José Crespo.

Montenegro's next screen project was Strangers May Kiss (1931) starring Norma Shearer and Robert Montgomery, with Montenegro in the ingenue role as "Spanish Dancer." By mid-1931, Montenegro had left MGM and signed with Fox Film Corporation.

== Train wreck ==
In August 1931, Montenegro was aboard the Southern Pacific Argonaut (passenger train) when the train derailed near Yuma, Arizona, two trainmen were killed in the crash. Luckily for Montenegro, she was riding in the second section along with actors Warner Baxter and Edmund Lowe. Forty others among the film company also riding in that section were spared injury when the second section missed hitting the first. The steam engine, two cars of the baggage car section, and a day coach overturned after the train struck a roadbed which had been softened by rain. The Argonaut was en route to a location shoot for The Cisco Kid (1931), in Tucson. Montenegro's character, "Carmencita," was the primary female role and source of strife between the Lowe and Baxter characters.

== Fox starlet ==
Montenegro was sometimes featured in stage shows which coincided with the screening of film premieres. One such instance was the premiere of A Passport To Hell, starring Elissa Landi. The movie debuted at the Loew's Kings Theater in August 1932. Montenegro provided the vaudeville entertainment beforehand. On another occasion, she teamed with Teddy Joyce in the stage show for the opening of The Kennel Murder Case (1933). The film screened at the Warner Brothers Hollywood Theater.

Montenegro's movie career in America continued until 1940. That year, she performed the leading female part in Eternal Melodies (Melodie eterne), an Italian production. The story focused on the unrequited first love of Wolfgang Amadeus Mozart, played by Gino Cervi. Playing Aloisa Weber, Montenegro jilts the composer in this Italian language production.

== Private life ==
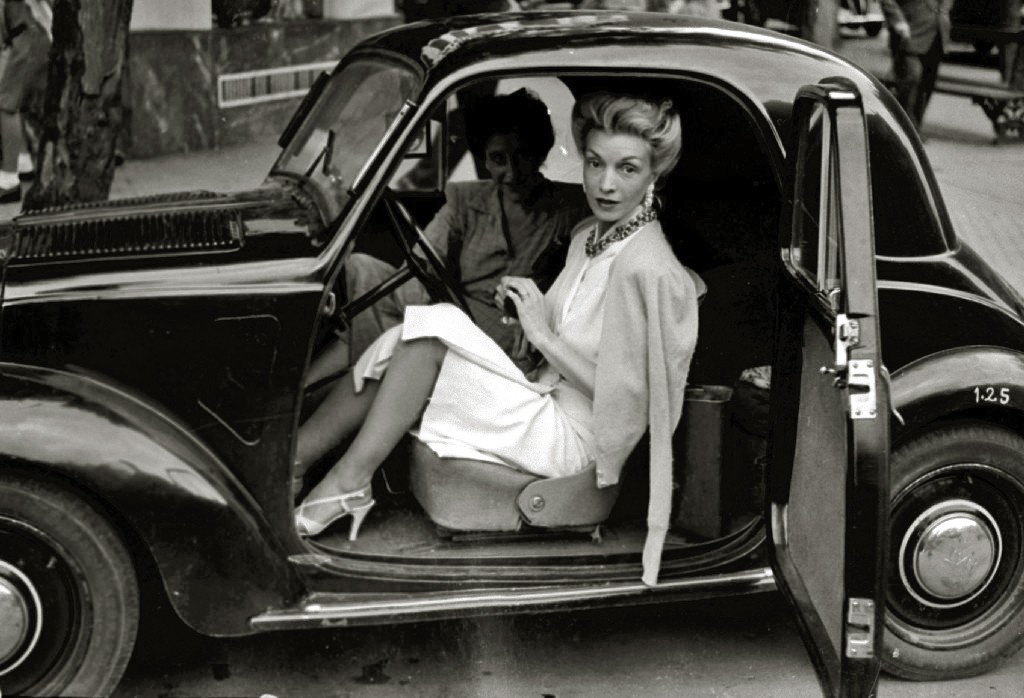
Conchita Montenegro in 1940.

Montenegro applied for US citizenship in Chicago, Illinois, on March 16, 1932. She married a Brazilian actor, Raul Roulien, in Paris, France, on September 19, 1935. The couple toured South America and produced a motion picture called Jangada (1936).

Following a rare interview with Montenegro shortly before her death, Spanish author José Rey Ximena claims in his book, El Vuelo del Ibis [The Flight of the Ibis] that British actor Leslie Howard, with whom Montenegro had an affair after the pair starred together in Never the Twain Shall Meet (1931), used Montenegro to get close to Spanish leader Francisco Franco.

After filming several movies in Spain, the last of which was Lola Montes (1944), Montenegro retired from the cinema. She died in Madrid on April 22, 2007.

== Selected filmography ==
- The Woman and the Puppet (1929)
- Strangers May Kiss (1931)
- Love in Every Port (1931)
- Never the Twain Shall Meet (1931)
- The Cisco Kid (1931)
- Forbidden Melody (1933)
- Laughing at Life (1933)
- Parisian Life (1936)
- Lights of Paris (1938)
- Cristobal's Gold (1940)
- The Birth of Salome (1940)
- Eternal Melodies (1940)
- Idols (1943)
- Lola Montes (1944)

== Bibliography ==
- "Films Please Spanish Star After Stage," The Gettysburg Times, Monday, November 14, 1932, Page 5.
- "Conchita Applauded," Los Angeles Times, July 11, 1931, Page A7.
- "Film Debutantes Make Bow In Row," Los Angeles Times, August 24, 1931, Page A1.
- "Talented Actress Stars On Screen," Los Angeles Times, August 19, 1932, Page A9.
- "Stage Star Conchita," Los Angeles Times, October 25, 1933, Page 11.
- "Musical Bill Now on View," Los Angeles Times, December 5, 1949, Page B9.
