= Bill Goodwin =

American radio announcer and actor (1910–1958)

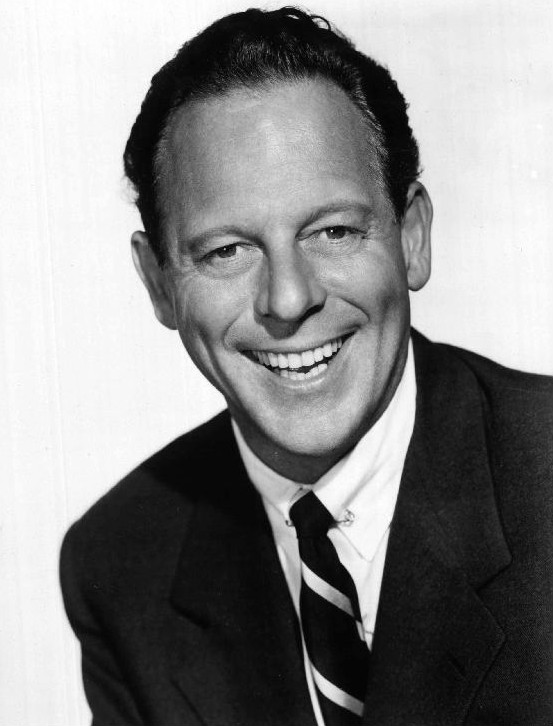
- Goodwin in 1951
- Born: William Nettles Goodwin; July 28, 1910; San Francisco, California, U.S.
- Died: May 9, 1958 (aged 47); Palm Springs, California, U.S.
- Burial place: Desert Memorial Park, Cathedral City, California, U.S.
- Occupations: Radio announcer; Actor
- Years active: 1941–1958
- Spouse: Philippa Hilber (m. 1938)
- Children: 4 including Bill Goodwin

William Nettles Goodwin (July 28, 1910 – May 9, 1958), was an American radio announcer and actor. He was for many years the announcer and a recurring character of the Burns and Allen radio program, and subsequently The George Burns and Gracie Allen Show on television from 1950–1951. Upon his departure, he was replaced by Harry von Zell.

== Early years ==
A native of San Francisco, California, Goodwin attended the University of California. He acted in stage productions on the West Coast before he began working in radio in 1930. His initial work on the air was at a station in Portland, Oregon. It was followed by stints at stations in Sacramento and Los Angeles.

== Radio ==
Goodwin was known for frequently promoting the item sold by the sponsor of the show (Swan Soap or Maxwell House Coffee, among others, on radio; Carnation Evaporated Milk on television). He was effective on radio in doing "integrated commercials", the first announcer to do so in which the advertisement was deftly woven into the show's storyline. In 1945, Goodwin was the "featured comedian" as a regular on The Frank Sinatra Show and The George Burns and Gracie Allen Show. In 1947, he had his own program, The Bill Goodwin Show, a situation comedy, also known as Leave It to Bill, which ran from April 26 – December 13, 1947. He was the announcer for the Blondie radio program.

== Television ==
Goodwin was the host of television shows, including Colgate Theatre and Penny to a Million. His last job as announcer was for NBC Radio's The Bob Hope Show (1953–1955). Not long before his death, Goodwin appeared as Ed Weston in two episodes of the short-lived CBS sitcom, The Eve Arden Show.

== Film ==
Goodwin acted in several movies, including The Stork Club (1945), The Jolson Story (1946), and Jolson Sings Again (1949). He played the role of Sherman Billingsley in The Stork Club (1945) and that of the hotel detective in Hitchcock's Spellbound (also 1945) and appeared with Doris Day in Tea for Two (1950) and It's a Great Feeling (1949). Goodwin's best film role was probably as a vain but impoverished stage actor in So This Is New York (1948). His last major role was as the narrator for the animated television cartoon Gerald McBoing-Boing.

== Walk of Fame ==
Goodwin was inducted into the radio portion of the Hollywood Walk of Fame February 8, 1960. His star is at 6810 Hollywood Boulevard.

== Family ==
Goodwin was married to actress Philippa Hilber; the couple had four children: Jill, Lynn, Sally, and Bill Jr. His son is jazz drummer Bill Goodwin.

== Death ==
Goodwin was found dead in his car on May 9, 1958, at the age of 47 after a heart attack in Palm Springs, California. He is interred at the Desert Memorial Park in Cathedral City, California.

== Partial filmography ==
- Let's Make Music (1941) as Announcer
- Blondie in Society (1941) as Announcer
- Blondie Goes to College (1942) as Announcer at Shell Race
- Wake Island (1942) as Sgt. Higbee / Narrator
- No Time for Love (1943) as Christley (uncredited)
- Henry Aldrich Gets Glamour (1943) as Steve Denning (uncredited)
- So Proudly We Hail! (1943) as Capt. O'Rourke (uncredited)
- Riding High (1943) as Chuck Steuart
- Bathing Beauty (1944) as Professor Willis Evans
- Incendiary Blonde (1945) as Tim Callahan
- River Gang (1945) as Mike
- Spellbound (1945) as House Detective of the Empire State Hotel
- The Stork Club (1945) as Sherman Billingsley
- To Each His Own (1946) as Mac Tilton
- House of Horrors (1946) as Police Lt. Larry Brooks
- Earl Carroll Sketchbook (1946) as Rick Castle
- The Jolson Story (1946) as Tom Baron
- Hit Parade of 1947 (1947) as Rod Huntley
- Heaven Only Knows (1947) as Bill Plumber
- So This Is New York (1948) as Jimmy Ralston / Captain Shaw in Play
- Mickey (1948) as George R. Kelly
- The Life of Riley (1949) as Sidney Monahan
- It's a Great Feeling (1949) as Arthur Trent
- Jolson Sings Again (1949) as Tom Baron
- Tea for Two (1950) as William 'Moe' Early
- The First Time (1952) as Mel Gilbert
- Lucky Me (1954) as Otis Thayer
- The Atomic Kid (1954) as Dr. Rodell
- The Opposite Sex (1956) as Howard Fowler
- Bundle of Joy (1956) as Mr. Creely
- Going Steady (1958) as Gordon P. Turner
- The Big Beat (1958) as Joseph Randall
