= Penny to a Million =

American TV game show (1955)

- Starring: Bud Collyer (pilot); Bill Goodwin
- Narrated by: Johnny Olson; Jay Stewart
- Country of origin: United States
- No. of episodes: ~20

Production
- Running time: 25 minutes

Original release
- Network: ABC
- Release: May 4 – October 19, 1955

Penny to a Million is an American television game show that aired on ABC from May 4 to October 19, 1955. Bill Goodwin was the host, although Bud Collyer served as emcee for the unaired pilot. It was broadcast from 9:30 to 10 p.m. Eastern Time on Wednesdays.

== Format ==
Contestants answered questions to build up a jackpot which started at one cent and could rise to a maximum of $10,000 (one million cents).

The game was played in three rounds. During each of the first two, four new contestants were selected from the audience and took turns answering questions. The jackpot began at zero in each round; the first correct answer added one cent, and each subsequent correct answer doubled the total. Any contestant who gave an incorrect answer or failed to respond within five seconds was eliminated from the game, receiving a gift certificate or savings bond ($25 for the first two eliminated, $50 for the third) and a pen or pack of cigarettes, depending on the day's sponsoring company. The round ended when three contestants had been eliminated, leaving one survivor to advance. If 20 or more correct answers were given, the jackpot was frozen at 500,000 cents ($5,000), rounded down from the total of 524,288 that would result from the initial cent being doubled 19 times.

At the start of each round and after an incorrect answer, the host would announce a new category and ask questions in it, starting with easy ones and progressing to higher difficulty. Musical categories were frequently used, requiring contestants to identify tunes as performed by a big band in the studio.

The winners of the two rounds faced each other in the third, for which their individual jackpots were combined. They alternated answering questions until one of them gave an incorrect response, after which the host would ask the opponent one final question. If the opponent also missed, the contestants each received half the jackpot; if the opponent answered correctly, they received 75% and the contestant who had first missed a question received the other 25%.

The show's title came from the range of possible jackpot values, from one to a million pennies (1¢ to $10,000). However, the rules ensured that no one contestant could win more than $7,500, achievable if the first two rounds went to the $5,000 maximum and the third one ended with a 75% victor.

== Production ==
Herb Wolf was the producer for Wolf Associates. Sponsors were Brown & Williamson Tobacco Corporation and W. A. Sheaffer Pen Company. Penny to a Million replaced Who Said That?, which Sheaffer had co-sponsored. Admiral, which was a co-sponsor of Who Said That?, chose not to back the new show.

Johnny Olson was the announcer for episodes that originated in New York; Jay Stewart announced those that originated in Los Angeles.

== Episode status ==
At least five episodes are known to exist, including the pilot.
