= Forbidden Melody =

1933 film directed by Frank R. Strayer

- Directed by: Frank Strayer
- Screenplay by: Paul Perez; Enrique Jardiel Poncela
- Story by: Eve Unsell
- Produced by: John Stone
- Starring: José Mojica; Conchita Montenegro; Mona Maris
- Cinematography: Harry Jackson
- Music by: Samuel Kaylin
- Production company: Fox Film Corporation
- Distributed by: Fox Film Corporation
- Release date: September 13, 1933 (US)
- Running time: 8 reels
- Country: United States
- Language: Spanish

La melodía prohibida, translated into English in English reviews as Forbidden Melody, was a 1933 American Spanish language drama film directed by Frank Strayer, which stars José Mojica, Conchita Montenegro, and Mona Maris. The screenplay was written by Paul Perez and Enrique Jardiel Poncela, from a story by Eve Unsell. It was produced and distributed by Fox Films, which released it on September 13, 1933.

== Plot ==
Kalu and Tuila are two South Pacific islanders who are getting married. Invited to their wedding are several tourists who have recently arrived aboard a yacht. During the wedding Kalu sings a "Forbidden Melody", which is a song that a young man sings only once in his life, on the day of his wedding. However, he is enticed by Peggy, a nightclub performer who arrived on the yacht, into an illicit affair, eventually leaving with the tourists when their yacht departs. One of the other tourists is a nightclub owner, who offers Kalu a job back in the states.

In the states, Kalu pursues Peggy, who leads him on. He performs the "Forbidden Melody", which is recorded. Eventually, Kalu discovers that Peggy was just leading him on. Despondent, one night he gets quite drunk, and believing that he hears Tuila's calling to him, he runs into the street, where he is struck and killed by a fire engine.

At home in the South Pacific, the island's governor hears the recording of Kalu singing the "Forbidden Melody".

== Cast ==
- José Mojica as Kalu
- Conchita Montenegro as Tuila
- Mona Maris as Peggy
- Romualdo Tirado as Al Martin
- Juan Martínez Plá as Bob Grant
- Carmen Rodríguez as Tía Olivia
- Antonio Vidal as El gobernador
- Ralph Navarro as Tom Nichols
- Agostino Borgato as Win Ta Tu
- Soledad Jiménez as Fa Uma
- Charles Bancroft as Ricky Doyle

== Reception ==
The film was reviewed by The San Francisco Examiner, The New York Times, and The Film Daily. The Examiner said the film allowed Mojica to display his wonderful tenor voice, and called the picture "beautifully produced ... is rich in romance". The Film Daily called it an "entertaining fantasy, something in the nature of a modern Garden of Eden."
