= El Grito de la Juventud =

El Grito de la juventud
- Directed by: Raul Roulien
- Written by: Raul Roulien
- Produced by: Raul Roulien
- Starring: Raul Roulien
- Release date: September 24, 1939
- Running time: 77 minute
- Country: Argentina
- Language: Spanish

El Grito de la Juventud is a 1939 Argentine comedy drama film of the Golden Age directed by Brazilian director Raul Roulien. The film premiered in Buenos Aires on 24 September 1939 and starred Vicente Climent.

== Cast ==
- Vicente Climent
- Lalo Malcolm
- Conchita Montenegro
- Raul Roulien
- Alberto Terrones
