= The Painted Woman =

1932 film by John G. Blystone

- Lobby card.
- Directed by: John G. Blystone
- Written by: Guy Bolton; Leon Gordon; Alfred C. Kennedy (play)
- Produced by: William Fox
- Starring: Spencer Tracy; Peggy Shannon; William "Stage" Boyd; Irving Pichel
- Cinematography: Ernest Palmer
- Edited by: Alex Troffey (uncredited)
- Music by: Jasper Blystone (musical direction)
- Production company: Fox Film Corporation
- Distributed by: Fox Film Corporation
- Release date: August 15, 1932
- Running time: 73 minutes
- Country: United States
- Language: English

The Painted Woman is a 1932 American pre-Code thriller film starring Spencer Tracy, Peggy Shannon and Irving Pichel and directed by John G. Blystone.

== Plot ==
After becoming involved in a killing, Kiddo gets on board Boyton's ship. When he learns what happened he dumps her on a South Sea island. Tom Brian marries her, and when Boynton returns, he is furious (he wanted to marry her). When Boyton is killed Kiddo is accused of the crime and even Tom thinks she is guilty.

== Cast ==
- Spencer Tracy as Tom Brian
- Peggy Shannon as Kiddo
- William 'Stage' Boyd as Captain Boynton
- Irving Pichel as Robert Dunn, Lawyer
- Raul Roulien as Jim Kikela
- Murray Kinnell as Collins
- Laska Winter as Tia Marquette
