= Nobody's Wife (1950 film) =

- Directed by: Gonzalo Delgrás
- Written by: José Francés (novel); Manuel Bengoa; Arturo Moreno
- Produced by: Antonio Bofarull
- Starring: Adriana Benetti; José Crespo; José Suarez
- Cinematography: Sebastián Perera
- Edited by: Antonio Cánovas
- Music by: Napoleone Annovazzi
- Production company: Titán Films
- Release date: 23 November 1950
- Running time: 85 minutes
- Country: Spain
- Language: Spanish

Nobody's Wife (Spanish:La mujer de nadie) is a 1950 Spanish drama film directed by Gonzalo Delgrás and starring Adriana Benetti, José Crespo and José Suarez.

== Synopsis ==
Javier Tasana adopts the daughter of a painter who has died in misery. Little Ella makes her adoptive father's character change little by little, but when she reaches adolescence, the young Ella will fall in love with her father's favorite disciple.

== Cast ==
- Adriana Benetti as Eliana
- José Crespo as Javier Tassana
- José Suárez as Juan Bautista Nebot
- Antonio Bofarull as Don César
- Fernando Sancho as Martorell
- Consuelo de Nieva as Clotilde
- Modesto Cid as Manolo
- Camino Garrigó as Vecina del pueblo
- Liria Izquierdo as Eliana niña
- Silvia de Soto as Invitada en fiesta
- Pedro Mascaró as Miembro jurado
- Enrique Navas as Invitado al principio
- Emilio Fábregas as Miembro jurado
- Fernando Porredón as Invitado fiesta
- Jesús Puche as Pintor criticón
- Luana Alcañiz as Duquesa
- José Clará as sculptor
- Adrián Jaramillo
- María Lledó
- Lali Monti
- Víctor Moya as painter

== Bibliography ==
- Àngel Comas. Diccionari de llargmetratges: el cinema a Catalunya durant la Segona República, la Guerra Civil i el franquisme, (1930–1975). Cossetània Edicions, 2005.
