= Piernas de Seda =

- Directed by: John Boland
- Written by: Paul Perez
- Produced by: John Stone
- Starring: Rosita Moreno; Raul Roulien; Enrique de Rosas
- Cinematography: Harry Jackson
- Music by: Samuel Kaylin (uncredited)
- Production company: Fox Film Corporation
- Distributed by: 20th Century-Fox
- Release date: October 4, 1935
- Running time: 80 minutes
- Country: United States
- Language: Spanish

Piernas de Seda is a 1935 American romantic comedy film directed by John Boland and starring Rosita Moreno, Raul Roulien, and Enrique de Rosas. The film was a Spanish-language remake of the 1927 silent film, Silk Legs. It was produced and released by 20th Century-Fox on October 4, 1935, in New York City.

Rita Hayworth had a small uncredited role as a ballerina.

== Cast ==
- Rosita Moreno as Lolita Baxter aka Mary Smith
- Raul Roulien as Frank Alton
- Enrique de Rosas as John Baxter
- Francisco Moreno as Conroy
- Romualdo Tirado as Fishback
- Manuel Peluffo as Enrique
- Rodolfo Hoyos as Lloyd
- Manuel París as Moran
- Antonio Vidal as Brown
- Rosita Granada as Secretaria
- Martin Garralaga as Evans
- José Peña
- Esther Brodelet as Ballerina (uncredited)
- Donald Brown (uncredited)
- Dixie Dean as Ballerina (uncredited)
- Dorothy Dearing as Dancer (uncredited)
- Florine Dickson as Dancer (uncredited)
- Rita Hayworth as Ballerina (uncredited)
