= Tengo fe en ti =

- Directed by: John Reinhardt
- Screenplay by: Paul Gerard Smith; Archibald Anderson
- Story by: Carmen V. Brown; John Reinhardt
- Produced by: Melville Shauer; William Gordon
- Starring: Rosita Moreno; José Crespo; Romualdo Tirado
- Cinematography: Arthur Martinelli
- Edited by: George McGuire
- Production company: Victoria Films
- Distributed by: RKO Radio Pictures
- Release date: July 7, 1940 (US)
- Running time: 66 minutes
- Country: United States
- Language: Spanish

Tengo fe en ti (English: I Believe in You) is a 1940 American Spanish language drama film. It was released on July 7, 1940. It was the only production of Victoria Films, which was run by Melville Shauer, who also co-produced the film and was the husband of the film's star, Rosita Moreno. Directed by John Reinhardt, the film also stars José Crespo and Romualdo Tirado.

== Cast list ==
- Rosita Moreno as Anna Tabor/María Ratyani
- José Crespo as Rodolfo Rey
- Romualdo Tirado as León León
- Frank Puglia as Enrico Buriani
