= Careless Lady =

1932 film

- Theatrical release poster
- Directed by: Kenneth MacKenna
- Screenplay by: Guy Bolton
- Story by: Reita Lambert
- Produced by: William Goetz
- Starring: Joan Bennett; John Boles; Minna Gombell; Weldon Heyburn; Nora Lane; Raul Roulien
- Cinematography: John F. Seitz
- Edited by: Alex Troffey
- Music by: Hugo Friedhofer
- Production company: Fox Film Corporation
- Distributed by: Fox Film Corporation
- Release date: April 3, 1932
- Running time: 68 minutes
- Country: United States
- Language: English

Careless Lady is a 1932 pre-Code American comedy film directed by Kenneth MacKenna and written by Guy Bolton. The film stars Joan Bennett, John Boles, Minna Gombell, Weldon Heyburn, Nora Lane and Raul Roulien. The film was released on April 3, 1932, by Fox Film Corporation.

== Cast ==
- Joan Bennett as Sally Brown
- John Boles as Stephen Illington
- Minna Gombell as Yvette Logan
- Weldon Heyburn as Jud Carey
- Nora Lane as Ardis Delafield
- Raul Roulien as Luis Pareda
- J. M. Kerrigan as Trowbridge
- John Arledge as Hank Oldfield
- Fortunio Bonanova as Rodriguez
- Josephine Hull as Aunt Cora
- Martha Mattox as Aunt Della
- William Pawley as Police Captain
- James Kirkwood, Sr. as Judge
- Maude Turner Gordon as Mrs. Cartwright
- Richard Tucker as Captain Gerard
- André Cheron as Konstantos
- James Todd as Peter Towne
- Howard Phillips as Jack Merre
- Marcelle Corday as Marie
- Louis Mercier as Chauffeur
