= Never the Twain Shall Meet (1931 film) =

1931 film

- Movie poster
- Directed by: W. S. Van Dyke
- Written by: Edwin Justus Mayer (adaptation); Ruth Cummings (dialogue); John Lynch (dialogue)
- Based on: Never the Twain Shall Meet; 1923 novel by Peter B. Kyne
- Produced by: Louis B. Mayer; Irving Thalberg
- Starring: Leslie Howard; Conchita Montenegro; C. Aubrey Smith
- Cinematography: Merritt B. Gerstad
- Edited by: Ben Lewis
- Production company: Metro-Goldwyn-Mayer
- Distributed by: Metro-Goldwyn-Mayer
- Release date: May 16, 1931
- Running time: 80 minutes
- Country: United States
- Language: English

Never the Twain Shall Meet is a 1931 American drama film produced and distributed by Metro-Goldwyn-Mayer and starring Leslie Howard and Conchita Montenegro. It is based on the novel of the same title by Peter B. Kyne. The film was directed by W. S. Van Dyke and was filmed in Tahiti like Van Dyke's two previous south sea adventures The Pagan and White Shadows in the South Seas. The film is a remake of a 1925 silent film of the same name.

== Plot ==
Dan Pritchard is a partner along with his father in a San Francisco-based shipping company. His socialite fiancée Maisie Morrison avoids setting a wedding date, much to his frustration. Dan is called to the ship of his father's friend, Captain Larrieau, who informs him he has contracted leprosy. He wants the Pritchards to act as guardians for his daughter Tamea, whose mother was a Polynesian queen. Tamea is a barefoot native girl, skimpily dressed, her hair wild and her aspect wilder. Once Pritchard agrees to take care of Tamea and see to it that she marries respectably, her father goes topside and jumps overboard.

Over the next few days, Dan cannot help becoming infatuated with Tamea, who constantly throws herself at him. She proceeds to shock Dan with her uninhibited behavior. While attending a party, Dan is put off by his friends' prejudice and his affections transfer from his fiancée to Tamea, who then seduces him. Dan's father, afraid that his son is losing control, puts Tamea on the next boat back to the islands. Dan soon follows.

The two live together happily at first, although it is evident from the start that Dan feels out of his element in the tropics, with nothing to do but lay about all day and drink in the local bar. Things start to go terribly wrong when Dan realizes that because Tamea has none of the sexual repressions of his Western world, she is a bit too free with one of the barely dressed native boys, Tolongo, and Dan becomes jealous of her attentions towards him. Dan becomes an angry drunk.

Fortunately for Dan, Maisie did not give up on him. She follows him to the island, rescuing him from the tropical paradise which has become his nightmare. Although Tamea is sad about Dan's departure, she immediately takes up with her bare-chested native boyfriend to help her forget.

== Cast ==
- Leslie Howard as Dan Pritchard
- Conchita Montenegro as Tamea Larrieau
- C. Aubrey Smith as Mr. Pritchard
- Karen Morley as Maisie Morrison
- Mitchell Lewis as Capt. Larrieau
- Hale Hamilton as Mark Mellenger
- Clyde Cook as Mr. Porter
- Bob Gilbert as Tolongo
- Joan Standing as Julia
- Eulalie Jensen as Mrs. Graves

== Production ==
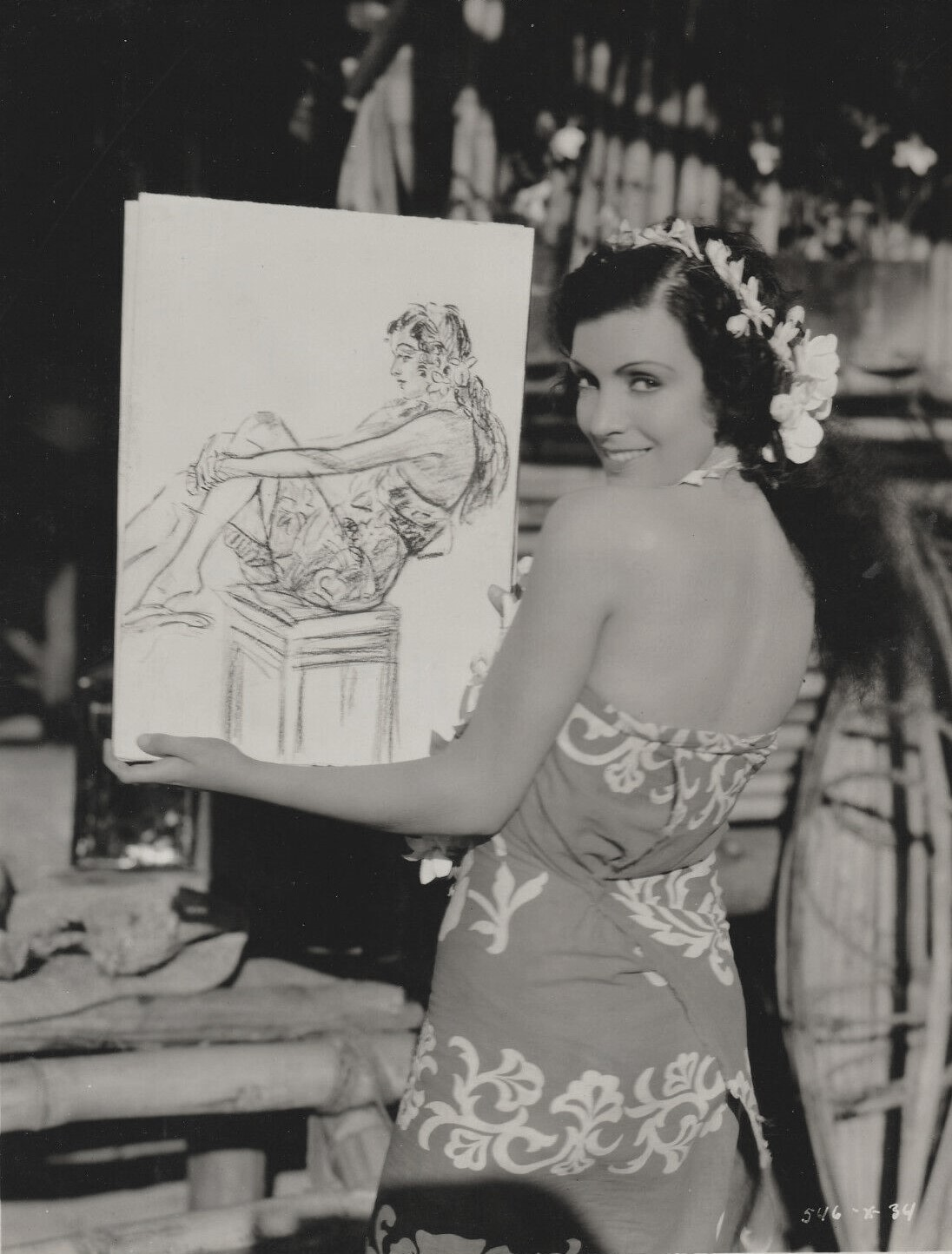
Promotional still with Conchita Montenegro

In 1931, Leslie Howard was new to Hollywood, having only appeared in two films, Outward Bound (1930) and Devotion (1931). In the spring of 1931, he was filming Never the Twain Shall Meet, A Free Soul with Norma Shearer and Clark Gable, and Five and Ten with Marion Davies—shooting one movie in the morning and another in the afternoon. This led to Howard's lifelong distaste for film acting, the studio system, contracts and the typical schedules required of a Hollywood actor. He said that a "typical 'talkie'...is manufactured on the conveyor-belt system" and that the script is "handed to the actor anywhere from a few days to a few hours before he reports for work...The cast is not even gathered together to read the script before it goes into production." Also, director W. S. Van Dyke was known as "One Take Woody" because he brought his films to completion on time and under budget.

It was long rumored that Conchita Montenegro, barely 18 years old, and Howard had a brief affair either during filming or shortly thereafter. Spanish author José Rey Ximena refers to the alleged affair in his book El Vuolo de Ibis [The Flight of the Ibis]/ It is clear that Howard and Montenegro were fond of each other as evidenced by photos taken of the two in Madrid, Spain, in May 1943, shortly before Howard's death. Rey Ximena's book also discusses the claim by Montenegro that she facilitated a meeting between Howard and Spanish dictator Francisco Franco at the request of Winston Churchill to convince Franco not to enter World War II on the side of the Axis powers.

Arthur Freed wrote the theme song, "Islands of Love."

== Reception ==
Although Never the Twain Shall Meet is not considered to be one of Howard's finest films, he did receive a positive review in The New York Times, which stated "Mr. Howard comes through with another of his specimens of finished acting, investing his character with humor and personality" and that the movie was worth seeing.

According to the file in the Motion Picture Association of America Production Code Administration Records (MPAA/PCA) Collection at the AMPAS Library, the film was only approved by the Hays Office because MGM's treatment of the picture was "all right from the point of view of miscegenation because the father of the girl is white and he is the only one shown in the picture. The mother was a Polynesian queen and Polynesians are not black." Hays official John V. Wilson also stated that "it might be dangerous to have the son (Leslie Howard) already married and that it would be better to retain the idea in the original story that he has been engaged to the girl a long time and is just on the point of marrying her...If in the beginning of the picture a great deal of audience sympathy is created for the situation surrounding the son and if in the end of the picture the audience is made to feel with him the fallacy of his action is deserting his former life, the tone of the picture will be kept at a level sufficient to satisfy the standards of the Code."
