= Hello, Frisco, Hello =

1943 film by H. Bruce Humberstone

- Theatrical release poster
- Directed by: H. Bruce Humberstone
- Written by: Robert Ellis; Helen Logan; Richard Macaulay
- Produced by: Milton Sperling
- Starring: Alice Faye; John Payne; Lynn Bari; Jack Oakie; Laird Cregar; June Havoc
- Cinematography: Charles G. Clarke; Allen M. Davey
- Edited by: Barbara McLean
- Color process: Technicolor
- Distributed by: 20th Century Fox
- Release date: March 11, 1943
- Running time: 99 minutes
- Country: United States
- Language: English
- Budget: $1,667,200
- Box office: $2,855,000 (US rentals) $4,370,500

Hello, Frisco, Hello is a 1943 American musical film directed by H. Bruce Humberstone and starring Alice Faye, John Payne, Lynn Bari, and Jack Oakie. The film was made in Technicolor and released by 20th Century-Fox. This was one of the last musicals made by Faye for Fox, and in later interviews Faye said it was clear Fox was promoting Betty Grable as her successor. Released during World War II, the film became one of Faye's highest-grossing pictures for Fox.

The film tells the story of vaudeville performers in San Francisco, during the period of the 1915 Panama Pacific Exposition when Alexander Graham Bell made the first transcontinental phone call from New York City to San Francisco. The movie introduced the song "You'll Never Know", which was sung by Alice Faye and won an Academy Award for Best Original Song. Although Faye never made an official recording of the song, it is often named as her signature song. Hello, Frisco, Hello was also nominated for an Academy Award for Best Color Cinematography, losing to Phantom of the Opera.

The opening sequence, in its entirety, is used in the film Nob Hill (1945), as is the basic plot.

This film is a remake of King of Burlesque (1936).

== Cast ==
- Alice Faye as Trudy Evans
- John Payne as Johnny Cornell
- Jack Oakie as Dan Daley
- Lynn Bari as Bernice Croft
- Laird Cregar as Sam Weaver
- June Havoc as Beulah Clancy
- Ward Bond as Sharkey
- Aubrey Mather as Douglas Dawson
- John Archer as Ned Clark
- Frank Orth as Sharkey's bartender, Lou
- George Lloyd as Foghorn Ryan
- Frank Darien as Missionary
- Harry Hayden as Burkham
- Eddie Dunn as Forman of Renovation Crew
- Charles Cane as O'Riley, Policeman

== Reception ==
The film made a profit of $1,233,200.

== Accolades ==
The film is recognized by American Film Institute in these lists:

- 2004: AFI's 100 Years...100 Songs:
  - "You'll Never Know" – Nominated
