= Lola Montes (1944 film) =

- Directed by: Antonio Román
- Written by: Francisco Bonmatí de Codecido; José María Pemán; Antonio Román; Fernando G. Toledo; Pedro de Juan
- Starring: Conchita Montenegro; Luis Prendes; Jesús Tordesillas
- Cinematography: Michel Kelber
- Edited by: Sara Ontañón
- Music by: Manuel Parada
- Production companies: Alhambra Films; Andalucía Films; Astoria Films
- Release date: 13 October 1944
- Running time: 90 minutes
- Country: Spain
- Language: Spanish

Lola Montes is a 1944 Spanish historical drama film directed by Antonio Román and starring Conchita Montenegro, Luis Prendes and Jesús Tordesillas. It portrays the life of the Irish dancer and courtesan Lola Montez.

== Synopsis ==
Ambitious Irish dancer Lola Montes rejects the love of Spanish Royal Guard captain Carlos Benjumea for success in Europe. In this way she ends up becoming the lover of the king of Bavaria and exciting the revolutionary spirits of the students of Munich, of which the intriguing Walter takes advantage for his sinister intentions.

== Cast ==
- Conchita Montenegro as Lola Montes
- Luis Prendes as Carlos Benjumea
- Jesús Tordesillas as Luis I de Baviera
- Mariano Alcón
- Joaquín Burgos
- Antonio Calero as Pepe Montes
- Ricardo Calvo
- Manuel de Juan
- Julio Rey de las Heras
- Miguel del Castillo
- Ramón Elías
- Félix Fernández
- César Guzmán
- Manuel Kayser
- Luis Latorre
- Guillermo Marín as Walter
- Carlos Muñoz
- Nicolás D. Perchicot
- José Portes
- Manuel Requena
- Santiago Rivero
- Rosario Royo
- Emilio Ruiz de Córdoba
- José María Rupert
- Sergio Santos
- Pablo Álvarez Rubio

== Bibliography ==
- Bentley, Bernard. A Companion to Spanish Cinema. Boydell & Brewer 2008.
