= Committee for the First Amendment =

Action group formed in September 1947

- Formation: September 1947; October 2025 (revival)
- Founder: Philip Dunne; Myrna Loy; John Huston; William Wyler Jane Fonda (revival)
- Location: Washington D.C.
- Members: Lucille Ball; Humphrey Bogart; Lauren Bacall; Jules Buck; Richard Conte; Joseph Cotten; Dorothy Dandridge; Bette Davis; Melvyn Douglas; Henry Fonda; John Garfield; Judy Garland; Ira Gershwin; June Havoc; Sterling Hayden; Paul Henreid; Katharine Hepburn; Lena Horne; Marsha Hunt; Danny Kaye; Gene Kelly; Evelyn Keyes; Burt Lancaster; Groucho Marx; Burgess Meredith; Vincente Minnelli; Edward G. Robinson; Robert Ryan; Frank Sinatra; Kay Thompson; Billy Wilder; Jane Wyatt

The Committee for the First Amendment was formed in September 1947 by actors in support of the Hollywood Ten during the hearings of the House Un-American Activities Committee (HUAC). It was founded by screenwriter Philip Dunne, actress Myrna Loy, and film directors John Huston and William Wyler. Their Hollywood Fights Back was a radio program of members voicing their opposition to the government's activities.

Other members included Lucille Ball, Humphrey Bogart, Lauren Bacall, Jules Buck, Richard Conte, Joseph Cotten, Dorothy Dandridge, Bette Davis, Olivia de Havilland, Melvyn Douglas, Henry Fonda, John Garfield, Judy Garland, Ira Gershwin, June Havoc, Sterling Hayden, Paul Henreid, Katharine Hepburn, Lena Horne, Marsha Hunt, Danny Kaye, Gene Kelly, Evelyn Keyes, Burt Lancaster, Groucho Marx, Burgess Meredith, Vincente Minnelli, Edward G. Robinson, Robert Ryan, Frank Sinatra, Kay Thompson, Billy Wilder, and Jane Wyatt.

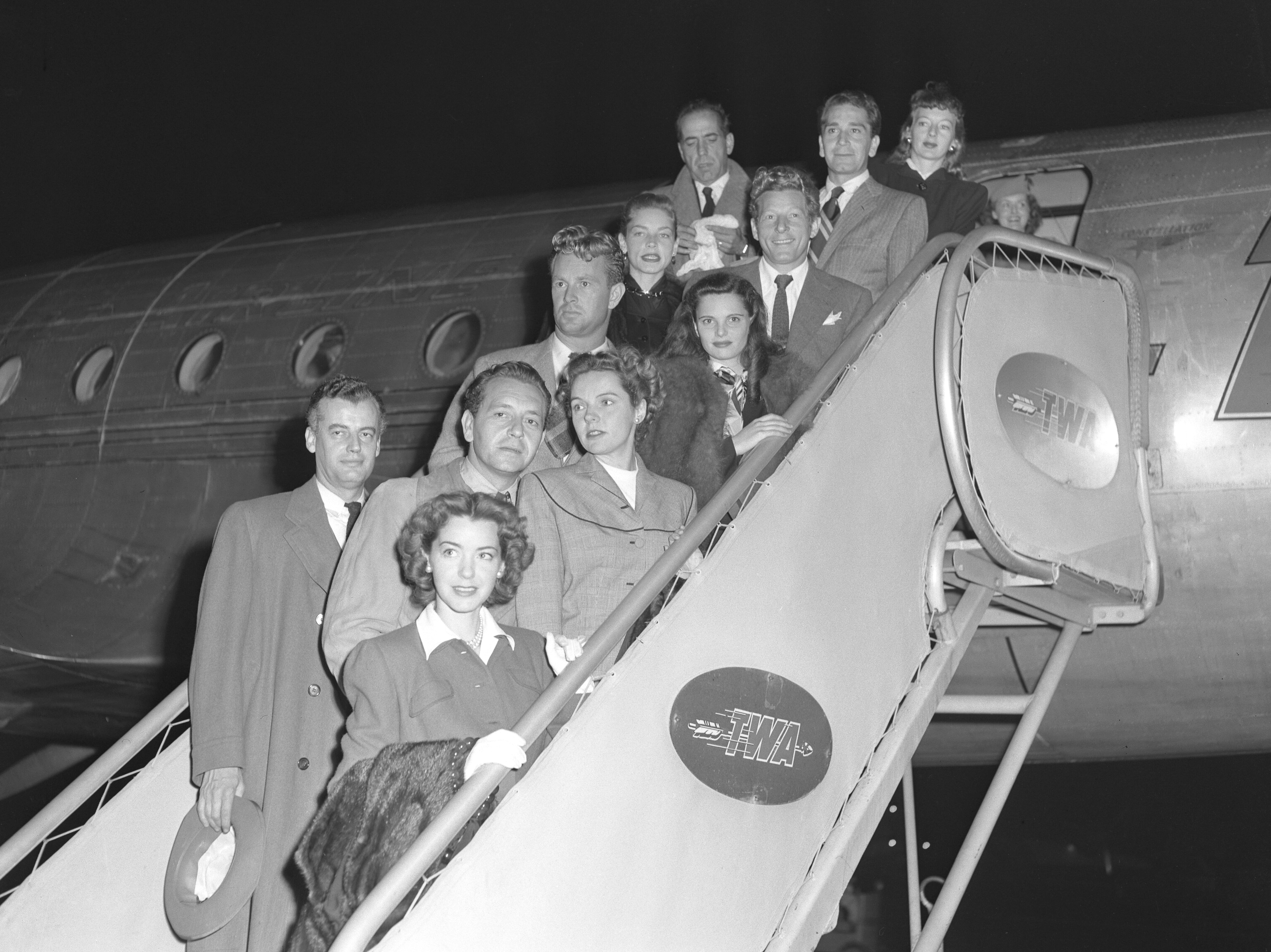
Members of the Committee for the First Amendment on their way to Washington, D.C. (1947)

On October 27, 1947, members of the group flew to Washington, D.C., to protest HUAC hearings. Their involvement was ineffective, and membership in this group came to be regarded with suspicion. Ira Gershwin, for one, was called before the California anti-Communist Tenney Committee, and was asked to explain his participation.

The committee's Hollywood Fights Back broadcasts on ABC Radio Network were two 30-minute programs that took place October 27 and November 2, 1947, during which committee members voice their opposition to the HUAC hearings.

== Backlash ==
The group, which was generally composed of non-Communist New Deal liberal Democrats, was hurt when it was subsequently revealed that Sterling Hayden had been a Communist Party member. Humphrey Bogart, who had been assured that the Committee membership had been vetted, and there were no Communists among its membership, was incensed by the revelation that Hayden was a Communist. There was a great deal of naïveté among Committee members such as Bogart, who did not know that Hollywood 10 members such as Alvah Bessie, John Howard Lawson, and Dalton Trumbo were known to be Communist Party members. Lauren Bacall later said that she, Bogart, and other Committee members had been duped by the Communists. "We didn't realize until much later that we were being used to some degree by the Unfriendly 10", she said.

The California state legislature, which had its own Un-American Activities Committee, soon branded the Committee as a Communist front organization. Ronald Reagan, who was the president of the Screen Actors Guild during the post-World War II Hollywood Red Scare and a dedicated anti-Communist as well as a liberal Democrat at the time, claimed that his fellow liberals had been the victims of "one of the most successful operation in [the Communists'] domestic history", terming them "suckers". Ira Gershwin later testified before the California State Senate's un-American activities subcommittee that he was appalled to have been involved with the group.

Bogart, Garfield, and Robinson later wrote articles stating that they were "duped" into supporting the Hollywood Ten. (Garfield was later blacklisted; Robinson “graylisted.”). The March 1948 issue of Photoplay included an article by Bogart, entitled "I'm No Communist". In this article, he claimed that he and other members of the Committee did not realize that some of the Hollywood Ten actually were Communists. Bogart, one of the biggest Hollywood stars of his time, was attacked by many liberals and fellow travelers for supposedly selling out to save his career.

== Aftermath ==
Humphrey Bogart continued to be a major star, having put the debacle of the Committee behind him. Both Bogart and Bacall continued to support Democrats stumping for Adlai Stevenson in both his presidential campaigns.

John Garfield was subpoenaed by HUAC in 1951, refused to name names, and was blacklisted, dying of a heart attack in 1952. It is generally believed he was never a party member, and his blacklisting contributed to the heart attack that killed him at the age of 39.

Edward G. Robinson, a well-known long-time New Deal liberal, who had been friends with President Franklin D. Roosevelt, was "graylisted" (never officially blacklisted, but not hired by film producers), and made his living as a stage actor during the period of McCarthyism until director Cecil B. DeMille, a noted and vociferous anti-communist, hired him for his 1956 remake of The Ten Commandments. Also "graylisted" were committee members Henry Fonda, Lena Horne and Melvyn Douglas.

Like Garfield, Sterling Hayden was subpoenaed by HUAC in 1951. Unlike Garfield, however, Hayden "named names", a decision he later regretted. "It is the one thing I've ever done in my life for which I'm ashamed", he said.

John Huston later moved to Ireland, reportedly to avoid any backlash from the McCarthyism that gripped the United States in the post-War period.

== 2025 revival ==
In 2025, the first year of the second Donald Trump administration, actress Jane Fonda, daughter of original committee member Henry Fonda, revived The Committee For The First Amendment to "defend our constitutional rights." In an open letter response to contemporary threats to free speech, she said "The federal government is once again engaged in a coordinated campaign to silence critics in the government, the media, the judiciary, academia, and the entertainment industry."

Over 550 prominent public figures joined Fonda on the Committee and include Aaron Sorkin, Barbra Streisand, Glenn Close, JJ Abrams, John Legend, Julia Louis-Dreyfus, Julianne Moore, Kerry Washington, Laraine Newman, Jim Beaver, Larry David, Lily Tomlin, Natalie Portman, Nikki Glaser, Patti LuPone, Pedro Pascal, Quinta Brunson, Rob Reiner, Rosie O’Donnell, Sean Penn, Spike Lee, Ted Danson, Mary Steenburgen, Viola Davis, Wanda Sykes, Winona Ryder, Whoopi Goldberg, Billie Eilish, Ben Stiller, Janelle Monae, and Fran Drescher.
