= José Crespo (actor) =

Spanish actor (1900–1997)

- Born: 7 November 1900; Murcia, Spain
- Died: 19 March 1997 (aged 96); Murcia, Spain
- Other name: José Crespo Férez
- Occupation: Actor
- Years active: 1924 - 1977 (film)

José Crespo (1900–1997) was a Spanish film actor. During the late 1920s and 1930s he worked in Hollywood, often as a leading man in Spanish-language versions of studio hits. Crespo was thought to resemble John Gilbert by MGM bosses, and was given roles performed by the American in the English versions. The two men became friends. Once the fashion for making separate Spanish versions was brought to an end by the rise of dubbing, Crespo moved to Mexico to work. He later returned to his native Spain.

== Selected filmography ==
- Revenge (1928)
- Joy Street (1929)
- Love in Every Port (1931)
- The Trial of Mary Dugan (1931)
- Mystery at Monte Carlo (1933)
- Angelina o el honor de un brigadier (1935)
- Tengo fe en ti (1940)
- Nobody's Wife (1950)

== Bibliography ==
- Lisa Jarvinen. The Rise of Spanish-Language Filmmaking: Out from Hollywood's Shadow, 1929-1939. Rutgers University Press, 2012.
