= Romualdo Tirado =

Romualdo Tirado Pozo, a.k.a. Romualdo Tirado Pozo, (September 3, 1880 – October 17, 1963) was a stage actor and theatre impresario with a prolific career in Spanish language films produced in Hollywood during the advent of film talkies.

== Early life ==
Romualdo Tirado was born in Quintanar de la Orden (Spain) on September 3, 1880. Orphaned from an early age, Romualdo began working as a child entertainer for the Juan Bosch Compañía Infantil, touring Spain and Latin America.

== Career ==
=== Latin America ===
During his stay in Argentina, Romualdo met Spanish stage actress Matilde Liñán (1881 - 1971), who was part of a Spanish operetta company she had joined with sister Filomena Liñán. Romualdo toured with the Liñán sisters and married Matilde in Guayaquil (Ecuador). He moved to Mexico where he worked in live entertainment. In 1917, he joined actress Maria Caballé in El Amor Que Huye (1917), directed by Carlos Martínez de Arredondo.

=== Los Angeles ===
In 1919, Romualdo arrived in Los Angeles with his family and a troupe of actors with which he produced live entertainment for local Spanish language audiences. He began renting local movie theaters to present his shows, including El Capitol Theatre and the Teatro Mexico, where he worked in collaboration with Mexican Musical Director E. González Jiménez. The theater impresario produced repertoire that included opera and zarzuela on to the presentation of Spanish language vaudeville and plays written by renowned international authors, as well as local.

=== Hollywood cinema ===
Next to actor José Peña Pepet, Romualdo is one of the most prolific actors to work in Hollywood produced Spanish language films following the advent of film talkies, also known as the Hispanic Cinema period.

=== Dubbing ===
In 1938, Romualdo worked in the Spanish version of Snow White and the Seven Dwarfs for Argentinean audiences by dubbing into Spanish the character of Doc.

== Filmography ==
- Mis dos amores (1938)
- Tengo fe en ti (1940)
