= José Mojica =

Mexican Franciscan friar

- Born: Crescenciano Abel Exaltación de la Cruz José Francisco de Jesús Mojica Montenegro y Chavarín; 14 September 1895; San Gabriel, Jalisco, Mexico
- Died: 20 September 1974 (aged 79); Lima, Peru
- Other names: Fray José de Guadalupe Mojica, OFM
- Education: National Conservatory of Music (Mexico); National School of Agriculture (Mexico)
- Occupations: Opera singer; Actor; Friar
- Years active: 1919–1940 (opera singer); 1930–1966 (actor); 1947–1974 (friar)
- Organization: Franciscan
- Known for: Film and opera performer; design of *Hotel Villa Santa Monica*; author of *I, a sinner (Yo, pecador)*
- Notable work: “Júrame” (recording, 1927); “Solamente una vez” (film debut 1941); autobiography *Yo, pecador* (1956)

Fray José de Guadalupe Mojica (14 September 1895 – 20 September 1974) was a Mexican Franciscan friar and former tenor and film actor. He was known in the music and film fields as José Mojica.

Mojica joined the world of the American film industry before entering religious life. Together with Dolores del Río, Tito Guízar, Ramón Novarro and Lupe Vélez, he was among the few Mexican people who made history in the early years of Hollywood. Regarding his activity as a friar, singer and actor, he felt that religion and art have never been at conflict. If God gave me the grace of voice and singing skills, I use them for His glory, he explained.

== Early life ==
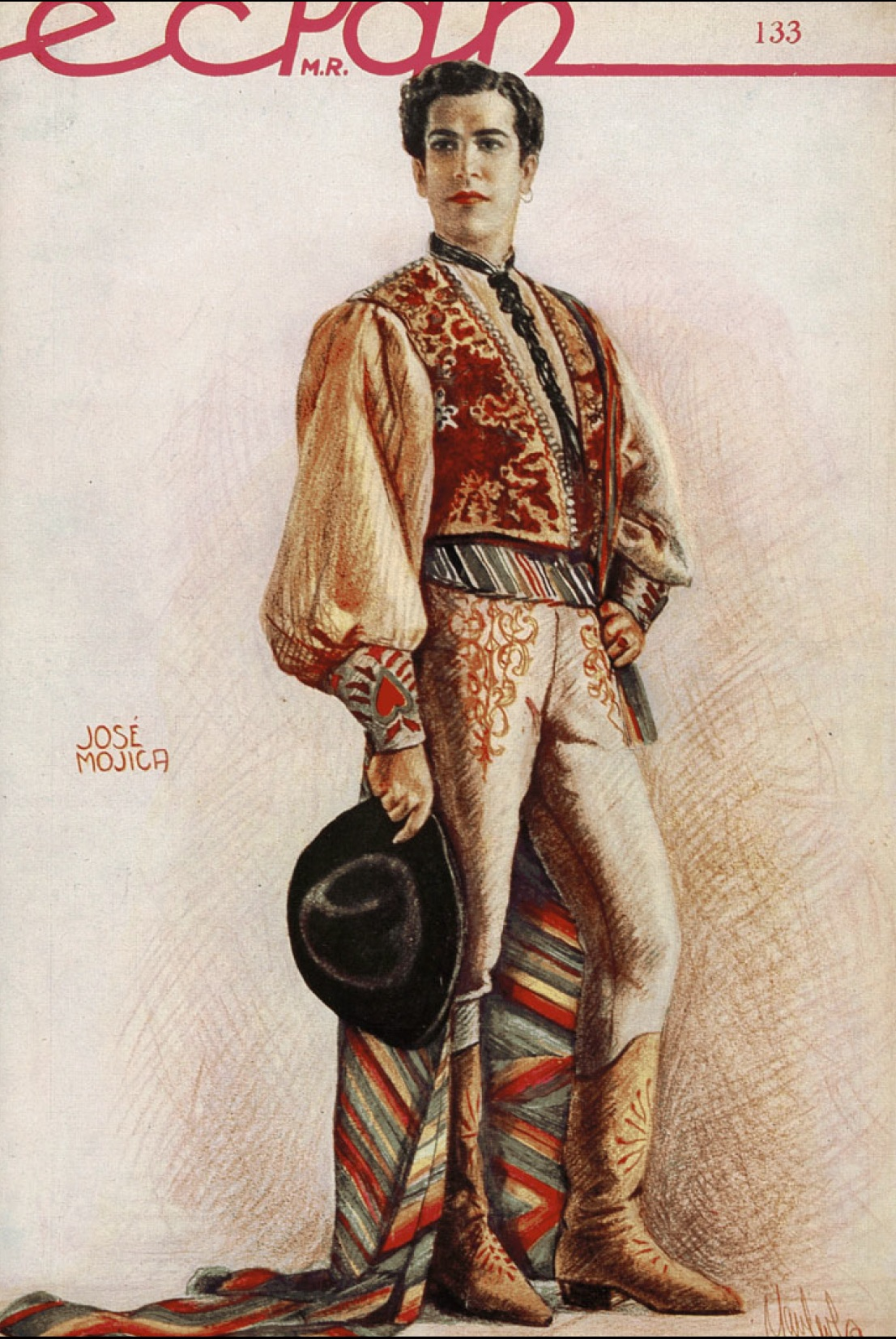
Cover of the Chilean magazine Ecran N°133 made by the Chilean cartoonist Raúl Manteola.

Born in San Gabriel, Jalisco, Mojica was raised in a coffee and sugar plantation community until the age of six, after his step-father Francisco died. He never knew his real father. When his mother's extended family suffered financial challenges, they moved with limited means to Mexico City where he studied at the Academy of San Carlos and later attended the National School of Agriculture.

Mojica wrote about the Revolution and Counter Revolution, the closing of the military academy due to the Mexican Revolution armed conflict, and his personal struggle from these events, in his book "I, a Sinner". This experience led him to find his true calling. He began taking private voice lessons while studying at the National Conservatory of Music of Mexico.

While at the Conservatory, Mojica also developed skills in drama and displayed a particular gift for languages, there mastering English, Italian and French. He learned to play the guitar and Mexican songs and practiced dance, athletics and horse riding. He would eventually begin working as an operatic tenor at the Teatro Ideal. On 5 October 1916 he debuted at the Teatro Arbeu, playing the Count Almaviva role in Rossini's opera The Barber of Seville. The following year, he performed the role of Rodrigo in Verdi's Otello.

== Career in the United States ==
Shortly after the United States entered World War I, funded with $500, Mojica moved to New York City and worked petty jobs before joining an opera company. In his spare time, he attended performances of Enrico Caruso at the Metropolitan Opera. The famed Caruso, having met Mojica in 1919, was impressed with Mojica's vocal skills and helped him obtain a contract with the Chicago Civic Opera company. He debuted on 22 November and performed the minor role of Lord Arthur Bucklaw in Donizetti's Lucia di Lammermoor that same year, an opera loosely based upon Sir Walter Scott's historical novel The Bride of Lammermoor.

While in Chicago he landed secondary roles, with his career slowly gaining momentum in 1921 when playing leading parts in Debussy´s Pelléas et Mélisande and Prokofiev's The Love for Three Oranges, the former alongside renowned soprano Mary Garden. Prokofiev attended Mojica's rehearsals where Mojica performed his first performance on 30 December, singing in French. Mojica also befriended Feodor Chaliapin during the singer's visit to Chicago. Under Chaliapin's guidance, he played the role of Shúyskiy in Mussorgsky's Boris Godunov.

In 1924 Mojica sang three roles at the San Francisco Opera. He appeared as Pinkerton in Madama Butterfly, Rinuccio in Gianni Schicchi and Rodolfo in La Bohème. These were his only appearances in San Francisco.

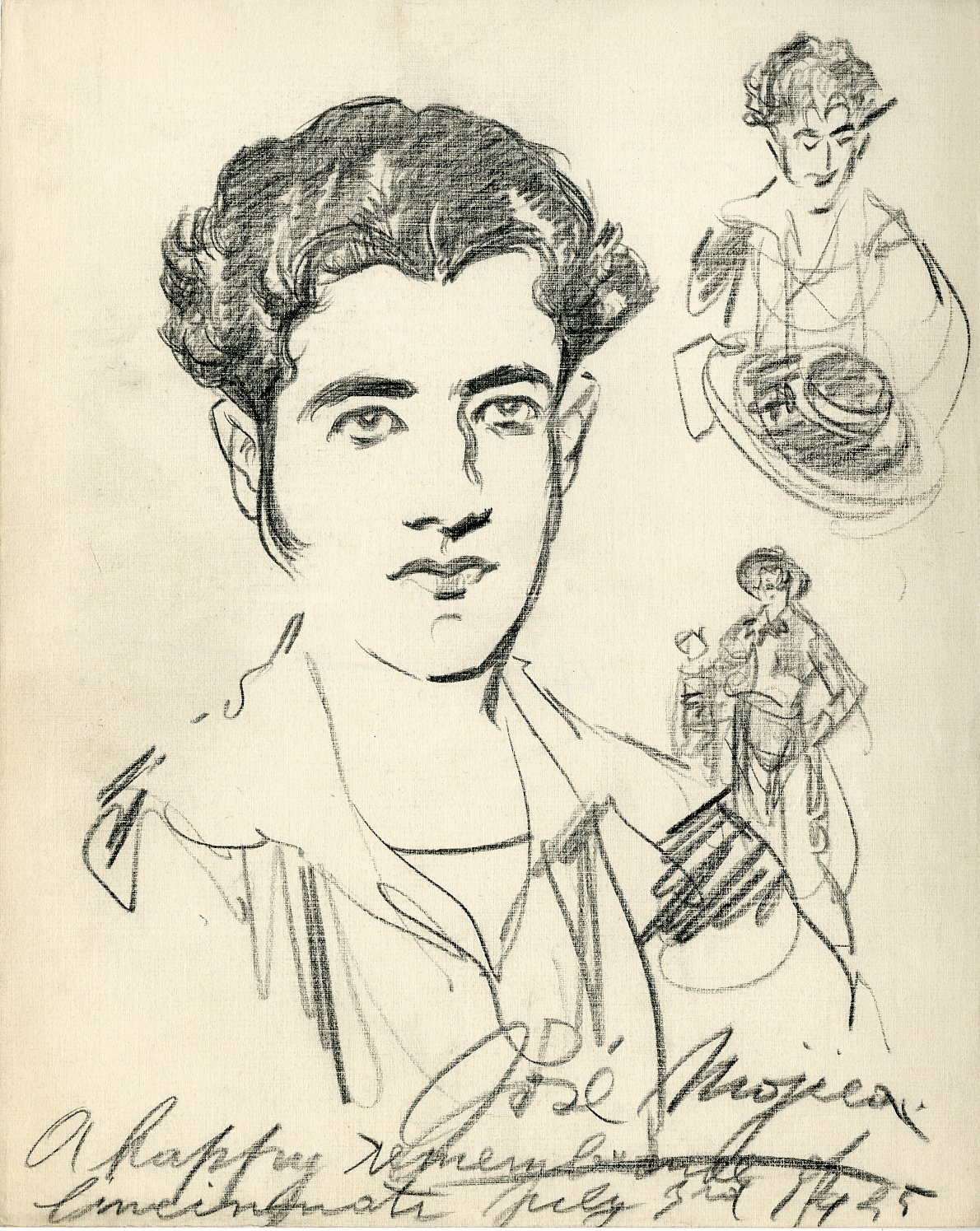
Jose Mojica signed drawing by Manuel Rosenberg while performing in Cincinnati, Ohio 1925

Caruso made two additional introductions that impacted his career. In the first. Caruso recommended Mojica to Edison to become one of Edison's Three Tenors. The second Caruso sending letters of introduction along with Mojica to Hollywood where young voices were needed to sing in 'talkies'. Going to California, and except for individual trips back to Chicago and New York for singing engagements, his career continued in films in Hollywood and throughout Latin America.

In 1933, after leaving Chicago, Mojica made a trip across the Atlantic, singing at the Mexican Embassy in Berlin and performing in Italy and Egypt. He also performed at the Chicago Opera as Fenton in Verdi's Falstaff during the 1940 season.

== Recording singing career ==
The versatility of Mojica is reflected in his extensive discography, which he recorded for Edison and the Victor Talking Machine Company.

By the time Mojica recorded for Edison in 1925, he had become an important figure at the Chicago Opera, moving into principal roles. He left Edison and joined the Victor roster in 1927 and made several successful early sound films. He moved comfortably during the 1930s through the worlds of opera, film, and concerts, but left this milieu in 1943 to become a priest. Like Edison, Mojica would eventually become completely deaf.

His popular musical recordings show an attractive lyrical voice being used with skill and imagination in songs such as Júrame, composed for Mojica by María Grever, released by Victor in 1927. The song became an instant success and has been recorded by countless singers over the years.

== Hollywood career ==
Opera work aside, Mojica found time to pursue an acting career in Hollywood. To this end, he began to court film Directors, one of whom was King Vidor. When Vidor learned that Mojica wanted to build a hacienda with a music salon in which to 'showcase his talent', he introduced Mojica to the architect John Byers who had recently finished designing Vidor's home. Mojica told everyone he was building his mother a "replica of the hacienda her family had lost during secularization." That so irritated Byers that he removed the hacienda from the list of homes he'd designed.

The Hacienda Mojica in Santa Monica Canyon where he later lived with his mother, Dona Virginia, was in an idyllic setting on Santa Monica Creek with neighbors Leo Carrillo and Dolores del Río as well as the remnants of the original Mexican Land Grant family. This home not only served as Mojica's "showcase" but through his constant entertaining it quickly became the center of Hollywood's Latino actors community. "Mojica's Rancho on Santa Monica Creek was a place where we could relax and be ourselves, away from Hollywood's expectations of players under contracts."

This home provided him with 'a stage' in which to perform and garner attention from the nearby Studios. Mojica signed a contract with Fox Film Corporation in 1930, making his debut the same year as a Spanish outlaw in the romantic musical One Mad Kiss (1930), co-starring Argentine actress Mona Maris. He co-starred with her in other films, and often alongside Spanish actresses Conchita Montenegro and Rosita Moreno. By finding himself in leading roles through his acting career, he was able to adapt to varied roles which included Latin lovers, a Russian cossack, Sultan of a harem, and an impersonation of Dick Turpin. For the rest of the decade, he also filmed in Argentine, Mexico, Peru and Spain.

A short time before his retirement, Mojica originally performed the song Solamente una vez, written by Agustín Lara, in the 1941 film Melodías de América. This song was known later as You Belong to My Heart, with English lyrics written by Ray Gilbert, and has been recorded by many other artists, including Andrea Bocelli, Nat King Cole, Bing Crosby, Charlie Haden and Elvis Presley.

== Antigua Villa Santa Monica ==
Antigua Villa Santa Monica is located at San Miguel de Allende, a city and municipality in the state of Guanajuato in North-Central Mexico. This estate was built in the 17th century with Spanish mining wealth when the nearby mountains were rich with silver. Abandoned at the time of the Mexican Revolution, the villa sat in ruins for years; Mojica acquired it in 1933 and rebuilt it for his mother, whose health was declining. Mojica envisioned an artistic enclave for San Miguel. Guests from the artistic community included María Félix, Dolores del Río, Pedro Armendáriz, Gary Cooper, John Ford, John Huston, Pedro Infante, Agustín Lara, Jorge Negrete, Pedro Vargas and John Wayne to this villa. Today, some trees on the property retain the nameplates of the celebrities who planted them. San Miguel de Allende recognized Mojica as a Distinguished Citizen and his former home on Parque Juarez was converted into Hotel Villa Santa Monica, a B&B on the street Padre Mojica. The Antigua Villa Santa Monica was converted into a hotel in the mid-1940s after the death of Mojica's mother.

The death of his mother in 1942 led him to reconsider his life. Two years later, he gave up his professional career and joined the Franciscan Order in Peru, distributing his estate mainly to the religious order. But first he endowed an orphanage in San Miguel.

== Religious life ==
After retiring from acting, Mojica periodically performed to support charitable causes. Following his career, he left for Cuzco, Perú, entering the Monastery of San Francisco, Lima and adopted the name of Fray Francisco José de Guadalupe Mojica. He was ordained a priest on 13 July 1947 by Peruvian Cardinal Juan Gualberto Guevara.

In Lima, Fray Mojica founded a school to train priests. He later began directing amateur plays and later became a painter to continue his artistic legacy. Then, spanning the decades of the 1950s and 1960s, he appeared in a few films in order to collect money for his order, which included the inauguration of the first television station in Brazil and South America, Rede Tupi, in 1950, and a concert tour of Central America to raise funds in 1954.

When Mojica became afflicted with temporary deafness, he was prompted by his superiors to write his autobiography, putting a halt to his singing. He finished his memoir, Yo pecador... (I, a Sinner) in 1956. The book sold more than three million copies in Spanish before its translation into English in 1963. A film adaptation of the book with the same title was released in 1959.

== Death ==
Mojica eventually lost his hearing entirely and became deaf. After suffering for years from acute hepatitis, he died in 1974 of heart failure at the Monastery of San Francisco in Lima, six days after his 79th birthday.

== Notable recordings ==
Date	Title	Composer	Label
1924	Al pie de tu ventana	Traditional serenade	Edison 80794
1924	Eres tú	Alfonso Esparza Oteo	Edison 80792
1924	Golondrina mensajera	Alfonso Esparza Oteo	Edison 80792
1924	Princesita	José Padilla	Edison 80794
1925	El Nopal	Mario Talavera	Edison 60047-L
1925	Lejos de ti	Manuel M. Ponce	Edison 60049-L
1925	Marchita el alma	Manuel M. Ponce	Edison 82344-L
1926	Una furtiva lagrima (L'elisir d'amore)	Gaetano Donizetti	Edison 82344-A
1926	Gratia plena	Mario Talavera/Amado Nervo	Edison 76018-L
1926	Lolita	Arturo Buzzi-Peccia	Edison 82344-L
1927	Pais azul	Jorge del Moral	Victor 40020
1927	Pasas por el abismo	Jorge del Moral/Amado Nervo	Victor 40021
1927	Júrame	María Grever	Victor 40023
1927	Gratia plena	Mario Talavera/Amado Nervo	Victor 40026
1928	Salve, dimora	Charles Gounod	Victor 42962
1928	Czar Berendey's cavatine	Nikolai Rimsky-Korsakov	Victor 42963
1930	Oh! Where are you?	José Mojica/Troy Sanders	Victor 58579
1930	One mad kiss	José Mojica/Troy Sanders	Victor 58658
1930	Behind the mask	James F. Hanley/Joseph McCarthy	Victor 58659
1930	Lament	José Mojica/Dudley Nichols	Victor 58662
1930	¿En dónde estás?	José Mojica/Troy Sanders	Victor 62644
1930	Un beso loco	José Mojica/Troy Sanders	Victor 62645

== Filmography ==
Year	Title	Country	Genre	Role	Refs
1930	One Mad Kiss	United States	Musical/Romance	José Salvedra	
1930	Cuando el amor ríe	United States	Drama/Romance	Emilio Rodríguez de Viana	
1931	Hay que casar al príncipe	United States	Comedy/Romance	Prince Alexis	
1931	La ley del harem	United States	Musical/Romance	Prince Al-Hadi	
1931	Mi último amor	United States	Comedy	Fernando Urrutia	
1932	El caballero de la noche	United States	Adventure	Dick Turpin	
1933	El rey de los gitanos	United States	Musical/Romance	Karol	
1933	Melodía prohibida	United States	Drama	Kalu	
1934	La cruz y la espada	United States	Drama	Hermano Francisco	
1934	Un capitan de Cosacos	United States	Drama	Sergio Danikoff	
1934	Las fronteras del amor	United States	Comedy/Musical/Romance	Miguel Segovia	
1939	The Adventurous Captain	United States	Adventure/Musical/Romance	don Gil de Alcalá	
1940	The Miracle Song	Mexico	Musical/Drama/Family	Ramón	
1941	Melodies of America	Argentina	Comedy/Musical	as himself	
1953	El pórtico de la gloria	Spain	Melodrama/Religion	as himself	
1959	Yo pecador	Mexico	Drama/Musical/Religion	as himself	
1966	Seguiré tus pasos	Mexico/Peru	Family/Drama/Religion	as himself	

== Sources ==
- Berger, Dina; Wood, Andrew Grant (2010). Holiday in Mexico: Critical Reflections on Tourism and Tourist Encounters – The Arrival of the Hollywood Star: José Mojica, page 188. Duke University Press Books. ISBN 978-0-82-234571-8
- Lacy, Mary (2008). The Grove Book of Opera Singers – Mojica, José, page 328. Oxford University Press. ISBN 978-0-19-533765-5
- Mojica, Fray José Francisco de Guadalupe – Autobiografía (1959). Editorial Jus (México). ISBN 0-7864-2100-2
