= Red Hot Tires =

Red Hot Tires may refer to:

- Red Hot Tires (1925 film), an American silent comedy film
- Red Hot Tires (1935 film), an American crime drama film
