= Why Girls Love Sailors =

1927 film by Fred Guiol

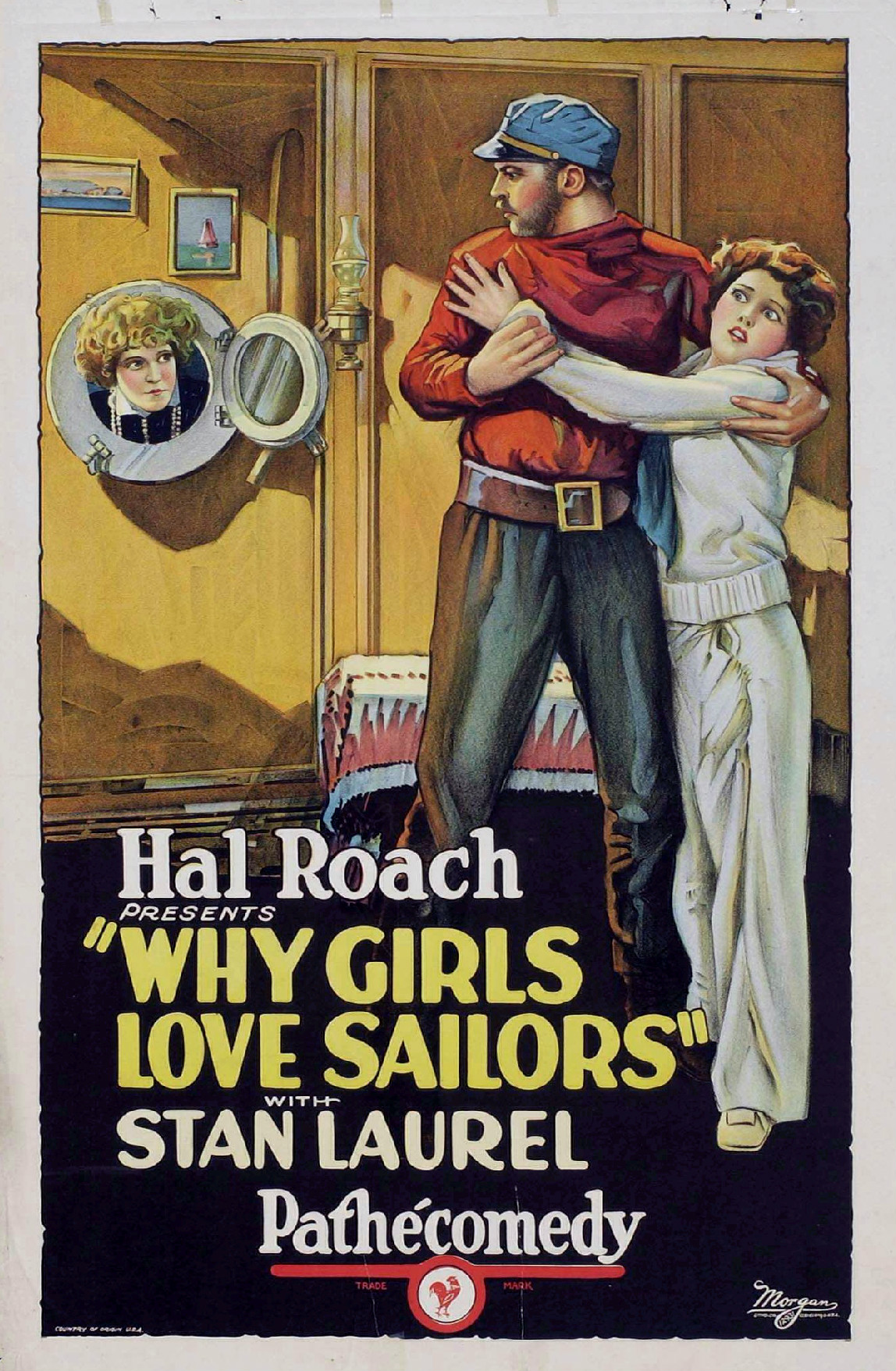
- Theatrical release poster
- Directed by: Fred Guiol
- Written by: Hal Roach; H. M. Walker (titles)
- Produced by: Hal Roach
- Starring: Stan Laurel; Oliver Hardy; Viola Richard; Anita Garvin; Malcolm Waite
- Edited by: Richard C. Currier
- Production company: Hal Roach Studios
- Distributed by: Pathé Exchange
- Release date: July 17, 1927
- Running time: 20 minutes
- Country: United States
- Language: Silent (English intertitles)

Why Girls Love Sailors is a 1927 American comedy short silent film directed by Fred Guiol for Hal Roach Studios. It stars Stan Laurel and Oliver Hardy before they had become the comedy team of Laurel and Hardy. It was shot during February 1927 and released July 17, 1927, by Pathé Exchange. It was considered a lost film until the 1980s.

== Plot ==
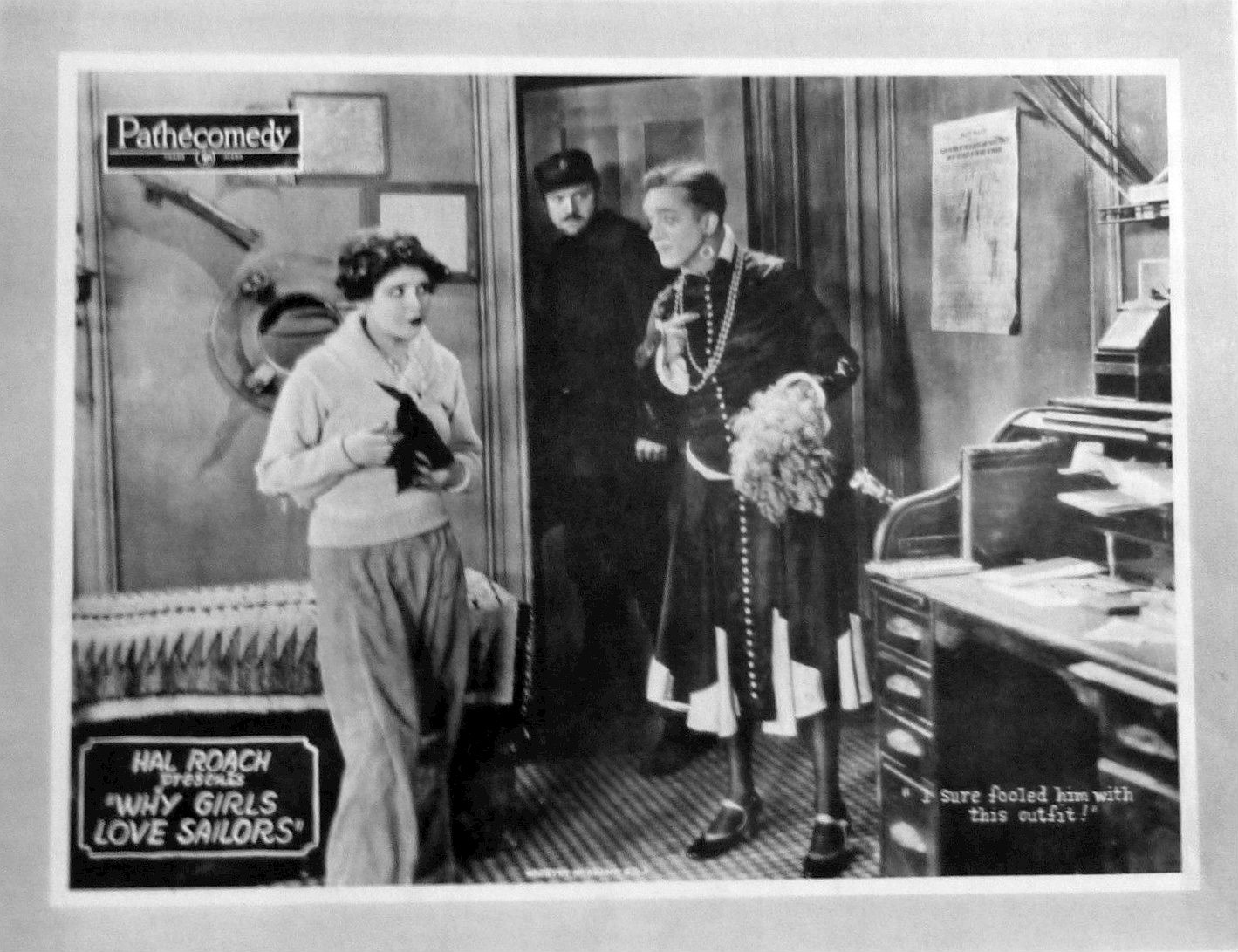
Lobby card

Why Girls Love Sailors (1927)

The vessel Merry Maiden is being loaded; the captain and the first mate are domineering figures among the crew. Meanwhile, on land, fisherman Willie Brisling is engaged to Nellie, with their affection evident. However, the captain spots Nellie, and develops an interest in her. Willie displays a tattoo of a ship on his chest, whereupon the captain pours a jug of water over it, and drags Nellie off to his ship.

Willie boards the ship, to try to rescue Nellie. He seeks to eliminate the crew one by one, by disguising himself as a woman, which leads to the first mate throwing several of them overboard.

The captain is molesting Nellie in his cabin. Willie, still in drag, sees this through a porthole and smiles at him. The captain locks Nellie away, and Willie goes in and flirts with him. The captain's wife arrives aboard unexpectedly, entering the cabin, and is enraged by the situation. Willie removes his wig, and claims that he was testing her love for her husband; they reconcile. However, when the captain threatens retribution against Willie, Willie brings Nellie in to expose the captain's wrongdoing.

After shooting her husband, the wife shoots Willie and Nellie, which unveils their undergarments, but they run off unharmed.

== Cast ==
- Stan Laurel as Willie Brisling
- Oliver Hardy as first mate
- Viola Richard as Willie's girl, Nellie
- Anita Garvin as captain's wife
- Malcolm Waite as captain
- Charles R. Althoff as Grandpa Brisling (uncredited)
- Edgar Dearing as amorous sailor (uncredited)
- Bobby Dunn as bemused sailor (uncredited)

== Production ==
The film marks the first appearance of Anita Garvin in a Laurel and Hardy picture; her involvement in the film was not known until the 1986 rediscovery. Deleted scenes from this film included actress Anna May Wong.

== Lost film found ==
After its initial run in 1927, and particularly after talkies eclipsed silent films' marketability, Why Girls Love Sailors went missing in the United States for nearly fifty years. Cinémathèque Française had a 16mm print, which French film critic Roland Lacourbe saw in 1971, and pronounced it mediocre.

When it was finally published, it was drawn from a 16mm print in a private collection, and only due to the efforts of a private collector in Copenhagen. Laurel and Hardy author Glenn Mitchell is even less impressed by the film than was Lacourbe: "Why Girls Love Sailors is one of several instances where the status of a 'lost' film has been reduced by its rediscovery," he writes. It is available in Europe on VHS and DVD releases, with reconstructed credits. In the United States, both VHS and DVD editions are out of print.
