= Mira McKinney =

American actress (1892–1978)

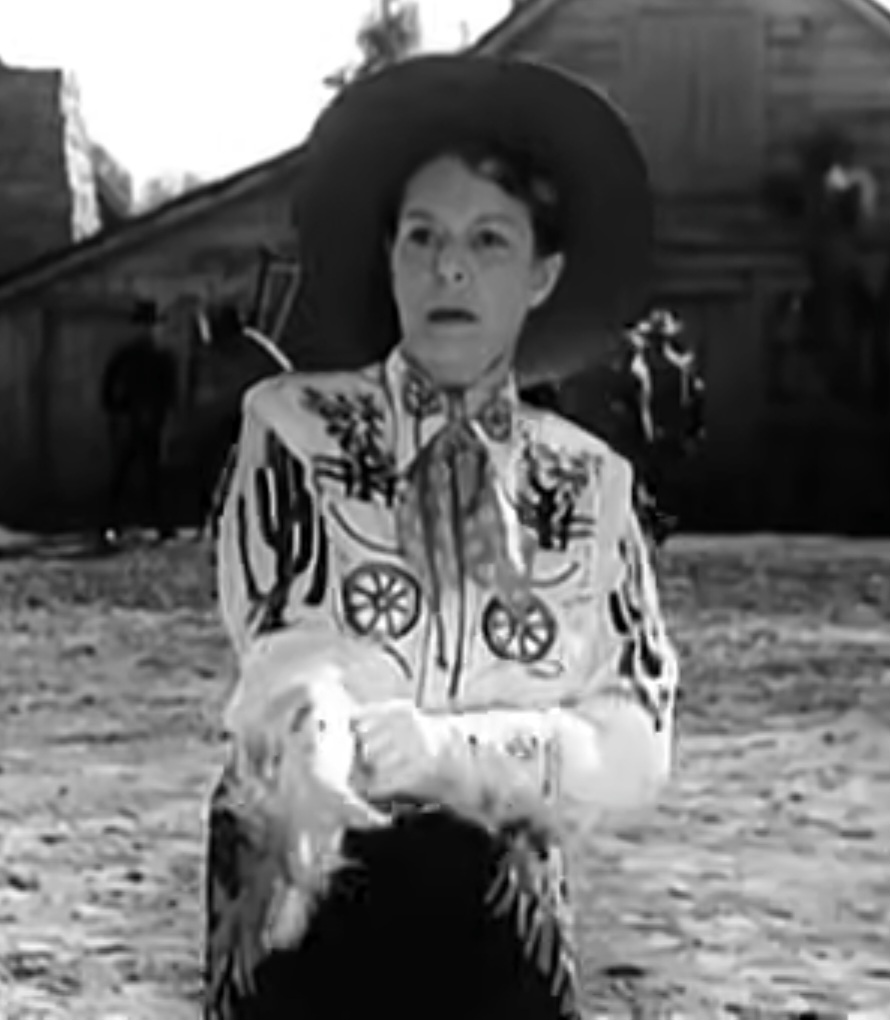
- McKinney in Heart of the Rockies (1951)
- Born: October 23, 1892
- Died: May 2, 1978 (aged 85); Los Angeles, California, U.S.
- Resting place: Hollywood Forever Cemetery
- Occupation: Actress
- Years active: 1936–1957
- Spouse: Edd X. Russell

Mira McKinney (October 23, 1892 – May 2, 1978) was an American actress.

== Personal life and death ==
McKinney was married to Edd X. Russell.

McKinney died in 1978 in Los Angeles, California, aged 85. She was buried in Hollywood Forever Cemetery.

== Selected filmography ==
- Modern Times (1936) - Minister's Wife
- Fury (1936) - Hysterical Townswoman at Trial (uncredited)
- The President's Mystery (1936) - Phony Townswoman (uncredited)
- Captains Courageous (1937) - Bit Role (uncredited)
- Meet the Missus (1937) - Baving Beauty (uncredited)
- The Case of the Stuttering Bishop (1937) - Ida Gilbert
- Blazing Sixes (1937) - Aunt Sarah Morgan
- Back in Circulation (1937) - First Matron (uncredited)
- Music for Madame (1937) - Rodowsky Admirer (uncredited)
- Arson Gang Busters (1938) - Lady (uncredited)
- Young Fugitives (1938) - Letty
- The Road to Reno (1938) - Hannah
- Garden of the Moon (1938) - Sarah - Champagne Customer (uncredited)
- Prairie Moon (1938) - Mrs. Higgins (uncredited)
- The Sisters (1938) - Minor Role (uncredited)
- The Great Waltz (1938) - Miss Dunkel (uncredited)
- Sweethearts (1938) - Telephone Operator (uncredited)
- Risky Business (1939) - Shirley Ann's Mother (uncredited)
- Woman Doctor (1939) - Nurse (uncredited)
- Cafe Society (1939) - Secretary (uncredited)
- I Stole a Million (1939) - Mrs. Loomis - Laura's Landlady (uncredited)
- When Tomorrow Comes (1939) - Waitress (uncredited)
- Stop, Look and Love (1939) - Flower Woman (uncredited)
- The Honeymoon's Over (1939) - Newspaper Woman (uncredited)
- The Shop Around the Corner (1940) - Customer (uncredited)
- The House of the Seven Gables (1940) - Mrs. Reynolds (uncredited)
- An Angel from Texas (1940) - Mrs. Mills (uncredited)
- Alias the Deacon (1940) - Mrs. Gregory
- Hot Steel (1940) - Elvira Appleby
- Bad Man from Red Butte (1940) - Miss Woods
- Earthbound (1940) - Minor Role (uncredited)
- Third Finger, Left Hand (1940) - Miss Dell (uncredited)
- Nobody's Children (1940) - Mrs. Ferber (uncredited)
- Sandy Gets Her Man (1940) - Flighty Woman (uncredited)
- Santa Fe Trail (1940) - Survivor at Delaware Crossing (uncredited)
- Nice Girl? (1941) - Gossip (uncredited)
- Bachelor Daddy (1941) - Landlady
- Life Begins for Andy Hardy (1941) - Miss Gomez, Fur Store Owner (uncredited)
- A Dangerous Game (1941) - Mrs. Hubbard
- Father Takes a Wife (1941) - Second Lady at Launching (uncredited)
- It Started with Eve (1941) - Party Guest (uncredited)
- One Foot in Heaven (1941) - Movie Theatre Cashier (uncredited)
- You Belong to Me (1941) - Lipstick Woman (uncredited)
- Always Tomorrow: The Portrait of an American Business (1941) - Little Boy's Mother (uncredited)
- Double Trouble (1941) - Mrs. Whitmore
- All Through the Night (1942) - Lady Behind Gloves at Auction (uncredited)
- Lady in a Jam (1942) - Lady of the Evening (uncredited)
- The Mummy's Tomb (1942) - Vic's Wife (uncredited)
- Red River Robin Hood (1942) - Mrs. Halstead (uncredited)
- Pittsburgh (1942) - Tilda (uncredited)
- Madame Spy (1942) - Red Cross Woman (uncredited)
- Keep 'Em Slugging (1943) - Customer (uncredited)
- Rhythm of the Islands (1943) - Miss Priddy
- Moonlight in Vermont (1943) - Elvira
- Standing Room Only (1944) - Wife of Colonel (uncredited)
- The Mummy's Ghost (1944) - Mrs. Evans (uncredited)
- Till We Meet Again (1944) - Portress (uncredited)
- The Affairs of Susan (1945) - Actress at Party (uncredited)
- The Man Who Walked Alone (1945) - Jail Matron
- Incendiary Blonde (1945) - Nurse (voice, uncredited)
- Rough Riders of Cheyenne (1945) - Harriet Sterling
- Fallen Angel (1945) - Mrs. Judd (uncredited)
- Hold That Blonde (1945) - Helen Sedgemore (uncredited)
- Talk About a Lady (1946) - Letitia Harrison
- Junior Prom (1946) - Mrs. Rogers
- Cluny Brown (1946) - Author's Wife (uncredited)
- Shadows Over Chinatown (1946) - Kate Johnson
- I've Always Loved You (1946) - Telsman (uncredited)
- Beat the Band (1947) - Mrs. Elvira Rogers
- Living in a Big Way (1947) - Committee Woman (uncredited)
- Something in the Wind (1947) - Old Woman (uncredited)
- Railroaded! (1947) - Beauty salon owner (uncredited)
- Linda, Be Good (1947) - Mrs. Thompson
- T-Men (1947) - Woman (uncredited)
- Sitting Pretty (1948) - Mrs. Phillips (uncredited)
- Mickey (1948) - Office Nurse (uncredited)
- The Snake Pit (1948) - Patient (uncredited)
- The Doolins of Oklahoma (1949) - Maudie (uncredited)
- Prejudice (1949) - Ma Hanson (uncredited)
- Trail of the Rustlers (1950) - Mrs. J.G. Mahoney
- A Woman of Distinction (1950) - Member (uncredited)
- Destination Big House (1950) - Mrs. Carroll (uncredited)
- Fancy Pants (1950) - Mollie (uncredited)
- Harriet Craig (1950) - Mrs. Winston (uncredited)
- Kansas Raiders (1950) - Woman Shouting Murder (uncredited)
- Hunt the Man Down (1950) - Rolene's Aunt (uncredited)
- The Groom Wore Spurs (1951) - Mrs. Forbes
- Heart of the Rockies (1951) - Mrs. Edsel
- The Blue Veil (1951) - Customer (uncredited)
- The Unknown Man (1951) - Maid (uncredited)
- Rose of Cimarron (1952) - Townswoman (uncredited)
- Paula (1952) - Professor's Wife (uncredited)
- Rainbow 'Round My Shoulder (1952) - Mrs. Abernathy (uncredited)
- Francis Covers the Big Town (1953) - Mrs. Henry Potterby (uncredited)
- The Last Posse (1953) - Mrs. Mitchell (uncredited)
- The Eddie Cantor Story (1953) - Pianist (uncredited)
- Women's Prison (1955) - Burke (uncredited)
- The Kettles in the Ozarks (1956) - Bit Role (uncredited)

== Selected television ==
Year	Title	Role	Notes
1952	Adventures of Superman	Madame Selena Dawn	Season 1, Episode 16, "Mystery in Wax"
1953	Death Valley Days	Lou Ellen Grimshaw	Season 2, Episode 1, "The Diamond Babe"
1954	The Lone Ranger (TV Series)	Matron	Season 4 Episode 8 "Stage to Tishomingo"
1956	The Adventures of Jim Bowie	Mrs. Pope	Episode "Natchez Trace"
