= Mario Talavera =

- Born: Mario Talavera Andrade; December 13, 1885; Xalapa, Veracruz, Mexico
- Died: March 27, 1960 (aged 74) Mexico City, Mexico
- Genres: Popular
- Occupations: Songwriter, tenor, conductor

Mario Talavera Andrade (December 13, 1885 – March 27, 1960) was a Mexican musician, tenor, songwriter and conductor.

Born and raised in Xalapa, Mario Talavera was the son of Francisco and Sebastiana (née Andrade) Talavera. The young Mario grew up with an intense love for music, especially opera and art songs. He also showed an early interest for composition, writing his first piece of music at the age of nine. As a teenager, he moved with his parents to Córdoba, Veracruz, where he completed his basic education.

Talavera then moved to Mexico City and joined the opera company, where he honed his vocal skills and achieved his dream of singing before large audiences opera works as Giacomo Puccini's La bohème, that gave him the musical direction he had long coveted, although his main contribution was as a popular music songwriter rather than as an opera singer.

During the decade of the 1920s, Talavera was part of several ensembles of traditional Mexican music, toured with the Orquesta Típica Presidencial, and organized and led various groups. Some of his most popular tunes include Amar en silencio, Arrullo, Bendita seas, China, El Nopal, Flor de Mayo, Jesusita la Vaquera and Muchachita mía. His most significant work at international level was Gratia Plena, with lyrics by the poet Amado Nervo, which was recorded in 1926 by the famous tenor José Mojica.

In 1945 Talavera became a founding member of the SACM (Sociedad de Autores y Compositores de México, for its acronym in Spanish) along with Alberto Domínguez, Alfonso Esparza Oteo, Manuel Esperón, Ignacio Fernández Esperón, Agustín Lara and Consuelo Velázquez, among others.

Talavera died in 1960 in Mexico City from advanced arteriosclerosis at the age of 74.
