= Malcolm Waite =

American actor (1892–1949)

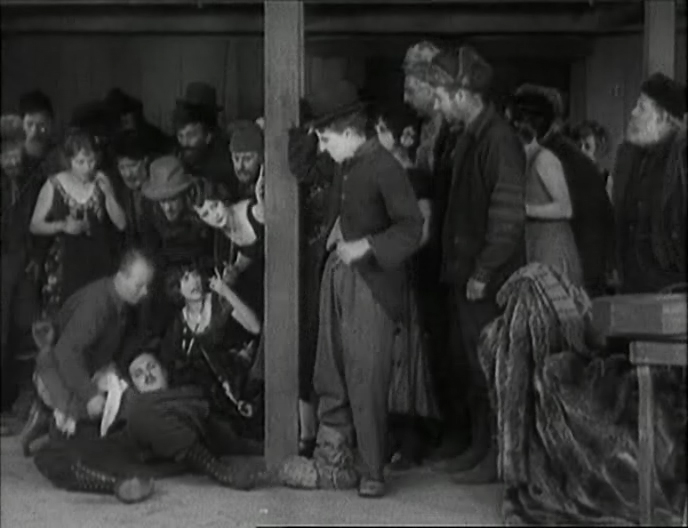
- Waite (knocked down by a falling clock) in The Gold Rush (1925)
- Born: Malcolm Ivan Waite; May 7, 1892; Menominee, Michigan, United States
- Died: April 25, 1949 (aged 56); Van Nuys, California
- Years active: 1923-1942

Malcolm Ivan Waite (May 7, 1892 – April 25, 1949) was an American film actor.

== Biography ==
Malcolm Waite appeared in 31 films between 1923 and 1942, most notably as the oily "ladies' man" Jack in Charlie Chaplin's film classic The Gold Rush; he also appeared in an early Laurel and Hardy comedy (before they were officially teamed), Why Girls Love Sailors. Waite was primarily a dramatic actor, who made only occasional forays into comedy. He was known as The Millionaires Extra, because he lived in the Ambassador Hotel in Los Angeles and was reportedly a member of the high society in New York, London and Paris. He was also an amateur heavyweight boxer. Waite had some good supporting roles in the silent era, but with the beginning of sound films his roles got smaller and he was often uncredited. The actor made his last film in 1942.

== Filmography ==
Year	Title	Role	Notes
1923	The Hunchback of Notre Dame		Short
1924	The Hill Billy	Big-Boy	
1925	The Gold Rush	Jack Cameron	
1925	The Lucky Horseshoe	Denman	
1925	Kentucky Pride	Carter	
1925	Red Hot Tires	Crook	
1925	Durand of the Bad Lands	Clem Allison	Lost film
1925	The Great Love	Tom Watson	Lost film
1926	No Man's Gold	Pete Krell	Lost film
1926	Blarney	Blanco Johnson	Lost film
1926	Kid Boots	Big Boyle	
1926	Desert Valley	Jeff Hoades	
1926	The Whole Town's Talking	Jack Shields	
1927	The Monkey Talks	Bergerin	
1927	The Broncho Twister	Dan Bell	Lost film
1927	Why Girls Love Sailors	Sea Captain	Short
1927	Now We're in the Air	Prof. Saenger	
1928	Noah's Ark	The Balkan / Shem	
1929	The Vagabond Lover	Ted Grant	Uncredited
1930	A Notorious Affair	Higgins - the Butler	
1931	24 Hours	Murphy	Uncredited
1934	Kid Millions	Trumpeter	Uncredited
1935	Diamond Jim	Fireman	Uncredited
1936	Poppy	Deputy Sheriff	Uncredited
1937	Blazing Sixes	Jamison - the smelter	
1939	Zenobia	Juryman	Uncredited
1940	The Boys from Syracuse	Captain of Guards	Uncredited
1941	Honky Tonk	Miner	Uncredited
1942	Jackass Mail	Cocky	Uncredited
1942	The Pride of the Yankees	Big Strength Machine Contestant	Uncredited
1942	The Navy Comes Through	Top Lookout	Uncredited, (final film role)
