= Desert Valley (film) =

1926 film

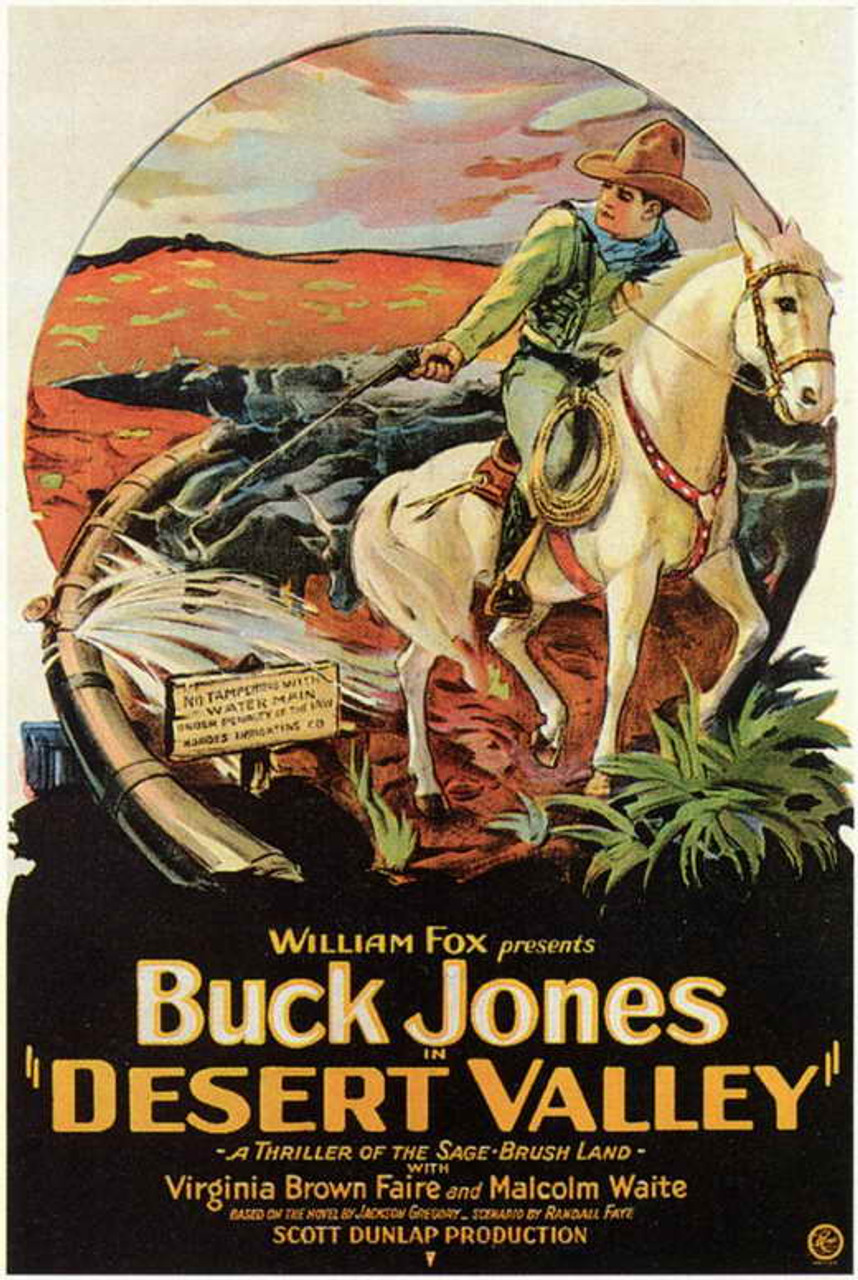
- Theatrical release poster
- Directed by: Scott R. Dunlap
- Screenplay by: Randall Faye
- Based on: Desert Valley by Jackson Gregory
- Starring: Buck Jones; Virginia Brown Faire; Malcolm Waite; Jack W. Johnston; Charles Brinley; Eugene Pallette
- Cinematography: Reginald Lyons
- Production company: Fox Film Corporation
- Distributed by: Fox Film Corporation
- Release date: December 26, 1926
- Running time: 66 minutes
- Country: United States
- Languages: Silent; English intertitles

Desert Valley is a 1926 American silent Western film directed by Scott R. Dunlap and written by Randall Faye based upon a novel by Jackson Gregory. The film stars Buck Jones, Virginia Brown Faire, Malcolm Waite, Jack W. Johnston, Charles Brinley, and Eugene Pallette. The film was released on December 26, 1926, by Fox Film Corporation.

== Cast ==
- Buck Jones as Fitzsmith
- Virginia Brown Faire as Mildred Dean
- Malcolm Waite as Jeff Hoades
- Jack W. Johnston as Tim Dean
- Charles Brinley as Sheriff
- Eugene Pallette as Deputy

== Preservation ==
A print of Desert Valley is preserved in the BFI National Archive in London.
