= Her Wedding Night =

1930 film

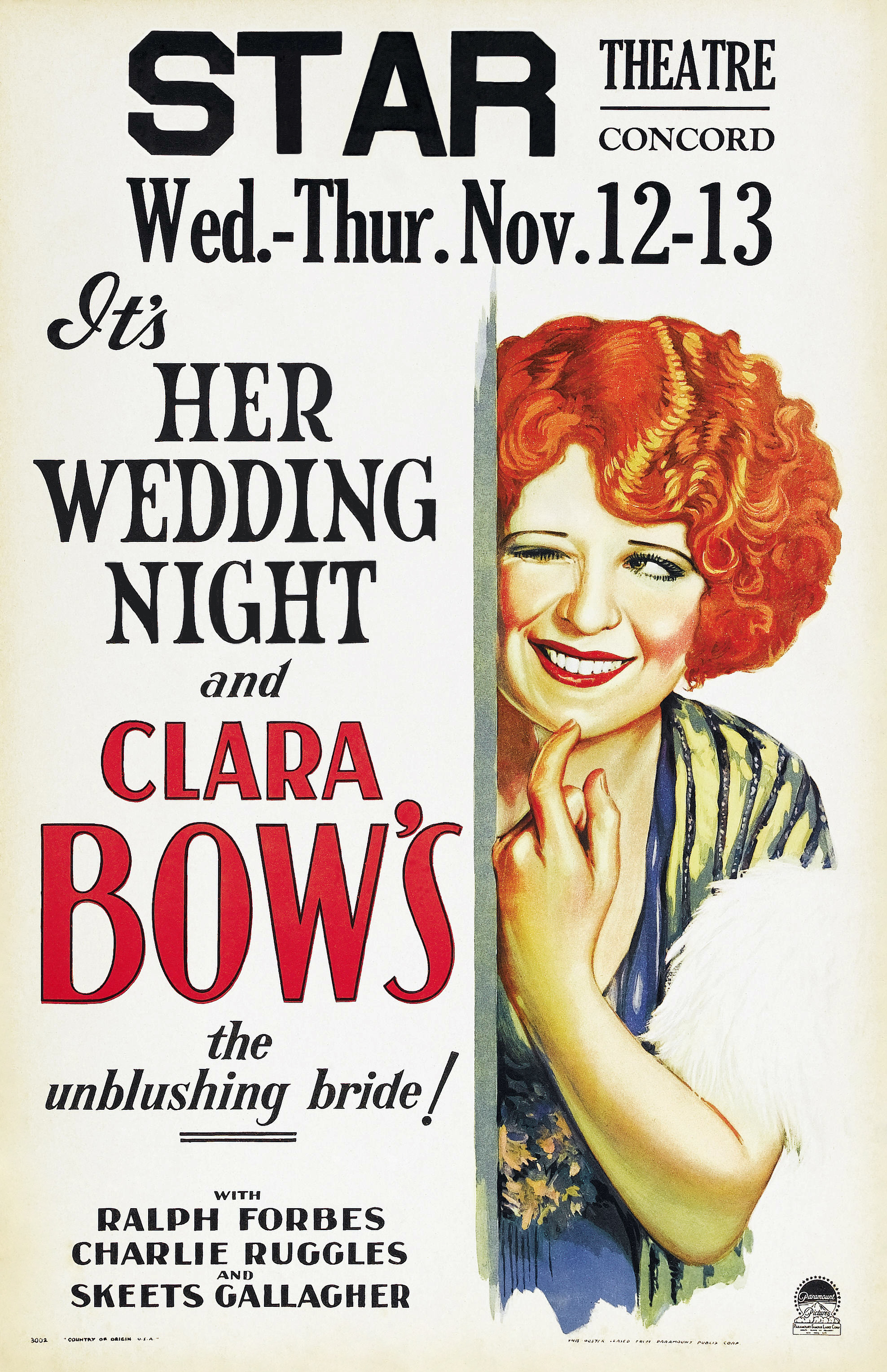
- Directed by: Frank Tuttle
- Screenplay by: Henry Myers
- Based on: Little Miss Bluebeard by Avery Hopwood and Gábor Drégely
- Produced by: E. Lloyd Sheldon
- Starring: Clara Bow; Ralph Forbes; Charlie Ruggles; Richard "Skeets" Gallagher; Geneva Mitchell; Rosita Moreno
- Cinematography: Harry Fischbeck
- Edited by: Doris Drought
- Music by: Herman Hand; Stephan Pasternacki
- Production company: Paramount Pictures
- Distributed by: Paramount Pictures
- Release date: September 18, 1930
- Running time: 75 minutes
- Country: United States
- Language: English

Her Wedding Night is a 1930 American pre-Code comedy film directed by Frank Tuttle and written by Avery Hopwood and Henry Myers. The film stars Clara Bow, Ralph Forbes, Charlie Ruggles, Richard "Skeets" Gallagher, Geneva Mitchell and Rosita Moreno. It was released on September 18, 1930, by Paramount Pictures. Paramount remade the film at the company's Joinville Studios in Paris in several other languages, including the French version titled Marions-nous.

The film is a remake of the silent film Miss Bluebeard (1925), also directed by Tuttle.

== Cast ==
- Clara Bow as Norma Martin
- Ralph Forbes as Larry Charters
- Charlie Ruggles as Bertie Bird
- Richard "Skeets" Gallagher as Dan Talmadge
- Geneva Mitchell as Gloria Marshall
- Rosita Moreno as Lulu
- Natalie Kingston as Eva
- Wilson Benge as Smithers
- Lillian Elliott as Mrs. MonkeyBalls
- Raoul Paoli as The Mayor
- Rose Dione as Masseuse (uncredited)
- Sam Savitsky as Parisian Boulevardier (uncredited)
