= John Stone (producer) =

American film producer

- Born: Saul Strumwasser; September 12, 1888; New York City, United States
- Died: June 3, 1961 (aged 72); Los Angeles, California, United States
- Occupations: Film producer Screenwriter
- Years active: 1921–1948
- Spouse: Hilda Stone
- Children: Peter Stone

John Stone (September 12, 1888 – June 3, 1961) was an American film producer and screenwriter. He was born in New York City and died in Los Angeles, California. He produced more than 70 films between 1930 and 1946. He also wrote for more than 60 films between 1921 and 1948, often during the early 1920s using the pen name Jack Sturmwasser. He was the father of the screenwriter and playwright Peter Stone.

== Partial filmography ==
- Bar Nothing (1921) writer
- Play Square (1921) writer
- What Love Will Do (1921) writer
- The Jolt (1921) writer
- Live Wires (1921) writer
- Little Miss Smiles (1922) writer
- The Yosemite Trail (1922) writer
- Iron to Gold (1922) writer / scenarist
- While Justice Waits (1922) writer
- Times Have Changed (1923) writer
- Bucking the Barrier (1923) writer
- Forgive and Forget (1923) writer
- Innocence (1923) writer
- The Heart Buster (1924) writer
- Gold Heels (1924) writer
- The Lucky Horseshoe (1925) writer
- The Timber Wolf (1925) writer
- The Shamrock Handicap (1926) writer
- 3 Bad Men (1926) writer
- Hard Boiled (1926) writer
- A Man Four-Square (1926) writer
- No Man's Gold (1926) writer
- The Broncho Twister (1927) writer
- Nevada (1927) writer
- Daredevil's Reward (1928) writer
- Win That Girl (1928)
- Fugitives (1929)
- The Black Watch (1929) writer
- Forbidden Melody (1933)
- Primavera en otoño (1933)
- El rey de los gitanos (1933)
- Las fronteras del amor (1934)
- La cruz y la espada (1934)
- Baby Take a Bow (1934) producer
- Nothing More Than a Woman (1934)
- She Learned About Sailors (1934) producer
- Charlie Chan in London (1934) producer
- Charlie Chan's Courage (1934) producer
- Charlie Chan in Shanghai (1935) producer
- The Great Hotel Murder (1935) producer
- Charlie Chan in Paris (1935) producer
- Charlie Chan's Secret (1936) producer
- Charlie Chan at the Race Track (1936) producer
- Charlie Chan at the Opera (1936) producer
- Charlie Chan at the Circus (1936) producer
- Ramona (1936) producer
- Under Your Spell (1936) producer
- Mr. Moto's Gamble (1938) producer
- Quick Millions (1939) producer
- Charlie Chan in Reno (1939) producer
- Mr. Moto in Danger Island (1939)
