= Sparrows (1926 film) =

1926 film

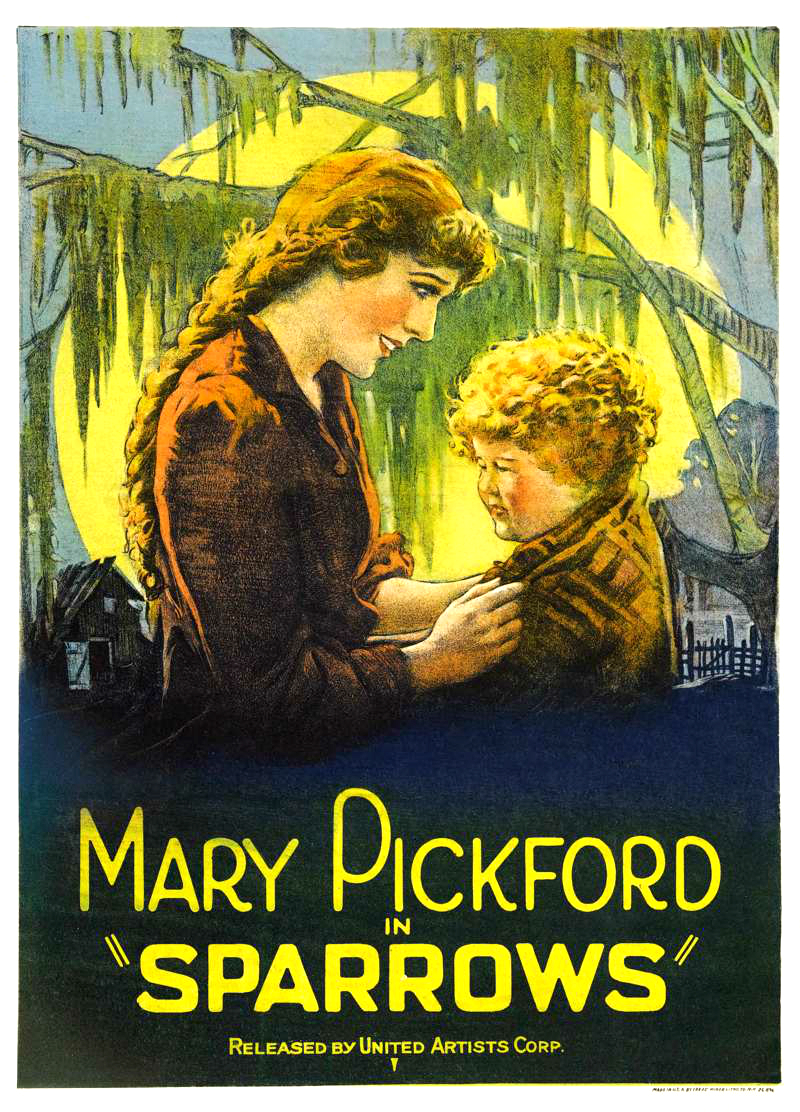
- Theatrical release poster
- Directed by: William Beaudine; Tom McNamara (uncredited)
- Written by: Winifred Dunn (story); C. Gardner Sullivan (adaptation); George Marion Jr. (titles)
- Produced by: Mary Pickford
- Starring: Mary Pickford; Gustav von Seyffertitz
- Cinematography: Hal Mohr; Charles Rosher; Karl Struss
- Edited by: Harold McLernon
- Distributed by: United Artists
- Release date: May 14, 1926 (US)
- Running time: 84 minutes
- Country: United States
- Language: Silent (English intertitles)
- Budget: $463,000
- Box office: $966,878 (rentals)

Sparrows (1926) by William Beaudine

Sparrows is a 1926 American silent drama film about a young woman who rescues a baby from kidnappers. The film, which was originally titled Scraps, starred and was produced by Mary Pickford, who was the most powerful woman in Hollywood at the time.

In 2025, the film was selected for preservation in the United States National Film Registry by the Library of Congress as being "culturally, historically or aesthetically significant."

== Plot ==
Mr. Grimes and his wife operate a dismal "baby farm" near an alligator-infested swamp. Molly, an adolescent inmate and the oldest of their charges, attempts to provide the other poorly clothed, starving kids with loving maternal care. Most of the children are orphans. One mother sends her child a doll, but Grimes crushes its head and tosses it into the swamp.

The children are ordered to hide anytime someone comes to the farm. When a hog buyer shows up, Ambrose, the Grimes' son, maliciously prevents Splutters, one of the children, from hiding. Splutters calls for Molly, who unsuccessfully demands Ambrose to let him go. Splutters then runs off, with Ambrose chasing after him. The buyer then purchases the boy from Grimes.

Molly has promised the others that God will rescue them. When a boy asks why nothing has happened after a month, she tells him that He is busy attending to sparrows (a biblical reference).

Ambrose catches Molly with stolen potatoes, so she and the others are given no supper. She pleads for the children, especially the sick, youngest baby, to no avail. Late that night, in a vision, Christ enters the barn where they sleep and takes the baby. When Molly wakes up, the child is dead.

Joe Bailey and his associate bring a kidnapped baby girl to the farm for concealment until they receive a ransom from the rich father, Dennis Wayne. When Grimes reads about the kidnapping in the newspaper, he decides it is safer to chuck the baby into the swamp. When Ambrose grabs the little girl to carry out the plan, Molly gets her back. After she fights off Grimes with a pitchfork, he strands her in the hayloft and decides he must get rid of her, too. That night, Molly flees with the children. Grimes figures either the mud or the alligators will take care of the runaways. However, when the kidnappers come back for the baby, he leads them on a search.

Meanwhile, Splutters is brought to the police station, having been discovered by one of the search parties. He tells the policemen and Mr. Wayne about the baby farm.

Molly and the kids emerge unscathed from the swamp and hide aboard a boat, unaware it belongs to the kidnappers. Pursued by the police, Grimes runs into the swamp, but falls into deep mud and perishes, while the two criminals flee in the boat. Unable to shake the harbor patrol, they try to slip away in a dinghy, but are run over and drown.

The baby is reunited with her wealthy father, but when she refuses to drink her milk without Molly, Mr. Wayne offers Molly a comfortable home. She accepts only on condition that he take in the other children as well.

== Cast ==
- Mary Pickford as Molly
- Roy Stewart as Dennis Wayne
- Mary Louise Miller as Doris Wayne, The Baby
- Gustav von Seyffertitz as Mr. Grimes
- Charlotte Mineau as Mrs. Grimes
- Spec O'Donnell as Ambrose Grimes
- Lloyd Whitlock as Joe Bailey / Stone
- Monty O'Grady as "Splutters"

Children:

- Billy Butts
- Jack Lavine
- Billy "Red" Jones
- Muriel McCormac
- Florence Rogan
- Mary McLain
- Sylvia Bernard
- Seesel Ann Johnson
- Camille Johnson

Cast notes:

- Sparrows was Pickford's next-to-last silent role, followed by 1927's My Best Girl. After that, Pickford made some talking pictures before retiring to Pickfair, her estate, with husband Douglas Fairbanks.

== Production ==
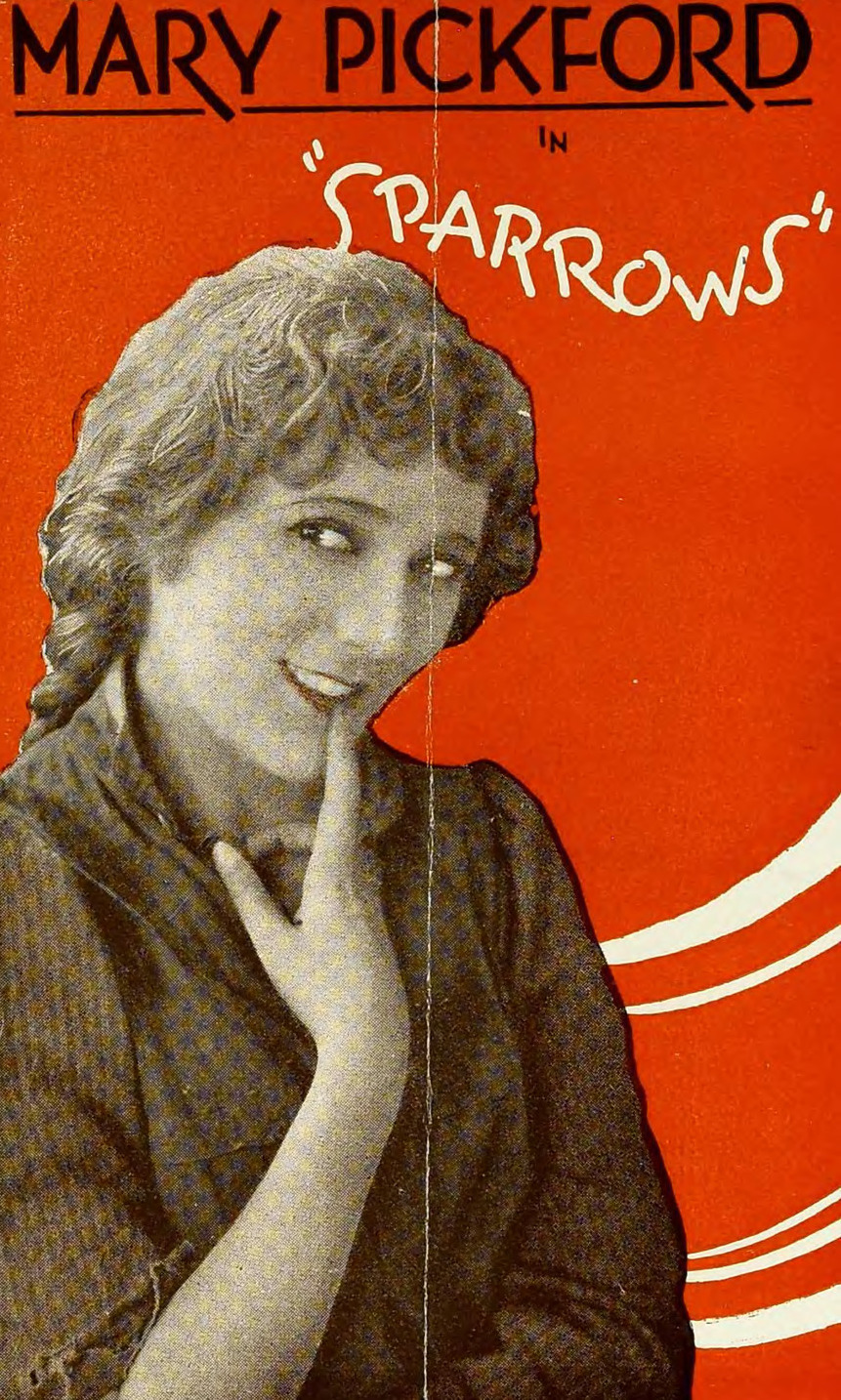
Sparrows cover art from United Artists Pressbook, 1926

In later years, Pickford repeatedly recounted the story that she was concerned that director William Beaudine was jeopardizing the actors, particularly when he insisted she carry a real baby, rather than a doll as she wanted, across some water teeming with alligators (albeit with their jaws bound shut). However, Hal Mohr, the film's director of photography, debunked this tale, saying "There wasn't an alligator within ten miles of Miss Pickford," and revealing in precise detail how the effect was done.

Art director Harry Oliver went to great lengths to transform 4 acres (16,000 m^{2}) of the back lot between Willoughby Avenue and Alta Vista Street into a stylized Gothic swamp. The ground was scraped bare in places, 600 trees were transplanted, and pits dug and filled with a mixture of burned cork, sawdust and muddy water.

== Critical reception ==
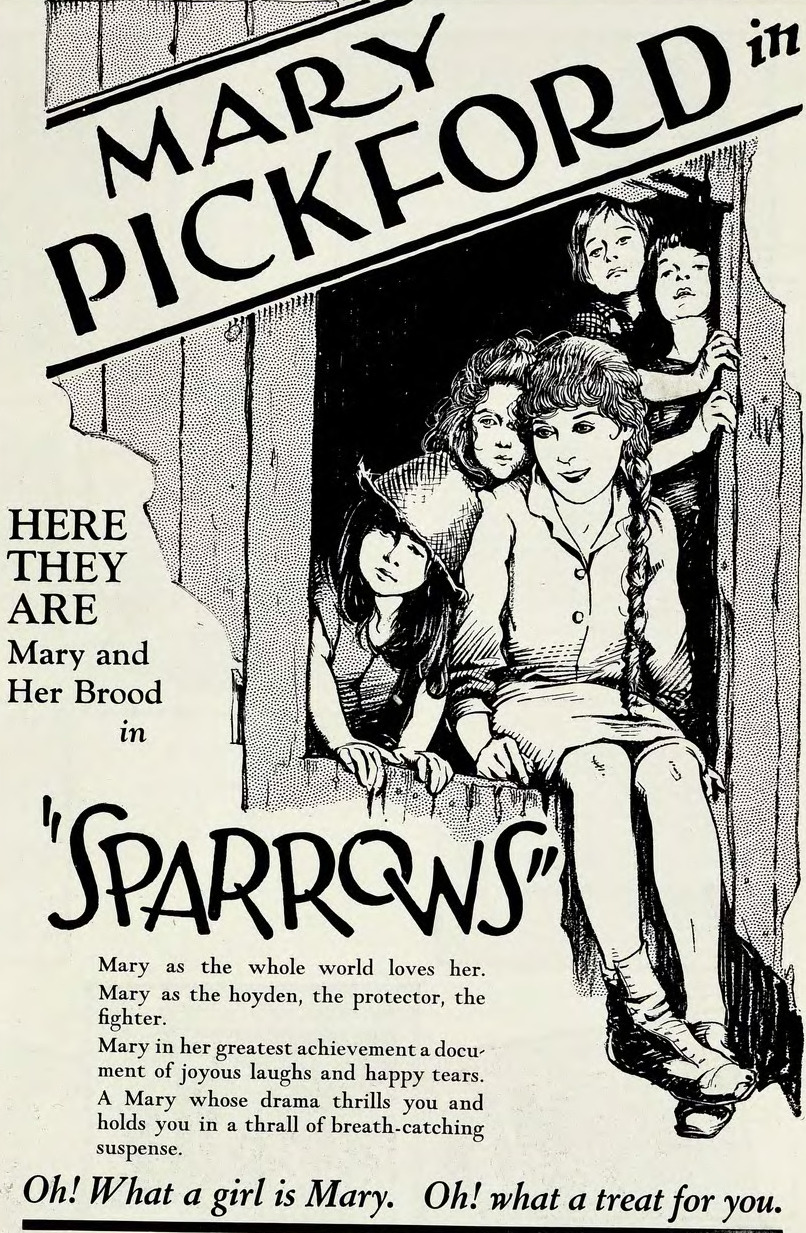
Sparrows ad from 1926 United Artists Pressbook

- The New York Times: "Although Miss Pickford's performance is as flawless as ever, it is doubtful whether she served herself well in selecting this special screen story, in which there is an abundance of exaggerated suspense and a number of puerile ideas. It is an obvious heartstring tugger during most of its length, and it frequently dallies with the thrills of old fashioned melodramas."
- Motion Picture Magazine, December 1925: "Melodrama is interwoven in the story and there is nothing new or startling about the plot. But you won't realize this until the last lovely close-up of Mary has faded from the screen. Which means, of course, that the story interests you so much that your critical faculty is dulled."
- Picture Play, January 1927: "The choice of 'Sparrows' was a singular one for Mary Pickford to make, but no one can deny that she has done the picture surpassingly well. The subject is gloomy, and some of the horrors recall Dickens, yet the darkness is shot through with many laughs. Indeed, so heavily does the hand of melodrama smite 'Sparrows' that the picture passes beyond the bounds of credibility. Thus the spectator relaxes, content to give way to his amazement at Mary's skill. ... 'Sparrows' is well worth seeing."
- Film historian Jeffrey Vance considers Sparrows to be Pickford's masterpiece. In his program notes for the Giorante del Cinema Muto (also known as the Pordenone Silent Film Festival,) Vance writes in 2008: "Sparrows is her most fully realized and timeless work of art. The film’s superb performances, gothic production design, and cinematography all serve a suspenseful, emotionally compelling story anchored by a central performance by Pickford herself imbued with pathos, humor, and charm."

== Home media ==
Milestone Film & Video released the Library of Congress restoration of Sparrows to DVD and Blu-ray on November 6, 2012, as part of a box set called Rags and Riches: Mary Pickford Collection, and contains an audio commentary track by film historians Jeffrey Vance and Tony Maietta.
