= Winifred Dunn =

American screenwriter (c. 1898–1977)

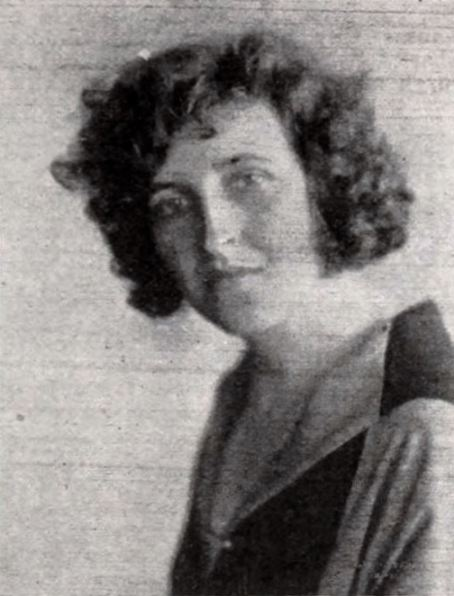
- Dunn in 1922
- Born: c. 1898; Wisconsin, United States
- Died: 1977 (aged c. 79)
- Occupations: Screenwriter, film editor, radio scenario writer, art critic

Winifred Dunn (c. 1898 - 1977) was an American screenwriter, editor, radio scenario writer, and art critic in the early 20th century. She was one of the youngest scenario editors of the silent era and was credited with writing over 40 productions.

== Early life ==
Born around 1898, Winifred Dunn spent her childhood on an island at Squirrel Lake, Wisconsin. Coming from a family of writers, Dunn made her decision to be a writer at the age of 6. She moved out to Chicago, Illinois, at a young age, starting a career that would lead her to be one of the youngest scenario editors in the film industry.

== Career ==
At the age of 18, Winifred Dunn wrote her first film, Too Late, which launched her formal writing career with the production company Selig Polyscope. Her talent for writing and formatting entertainment pieces became apparent when Dunn translated a German play into English, as well as formatted the production aspects to fit a natural setting on the American stage.

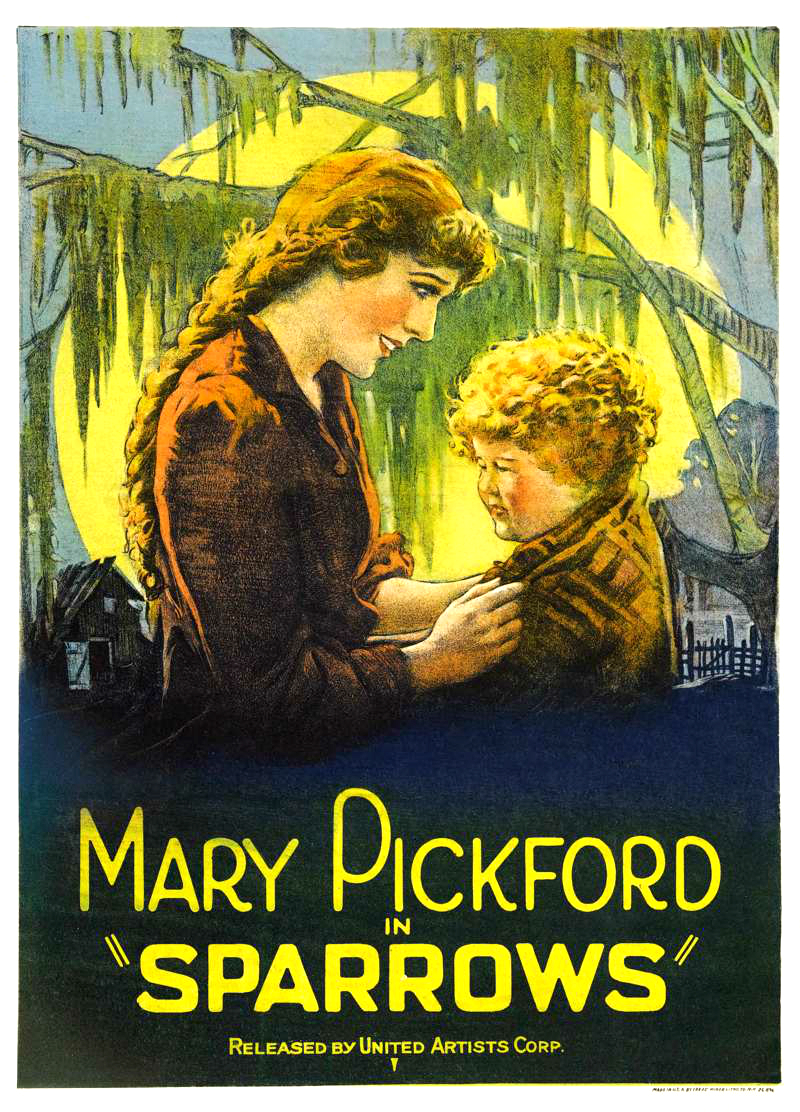
Sparrows (1926)

In 1921, Dunn made the big move out to Hollywood to continue the expansion of her career with Sawyer-Lubin Productions. It was there that her 1922 production of Quincy Adams Sawyer (1922) was edited and titled, and also where she wrote a screen adaptation of Your Friend and Mine (1923) by Willard Mack.

In February 1923, Dunn began a new position with Metro Pictures, later known as Metro Goldwyn-Mayer Studios, with formal tasks of a scenario editor. It wasn't long before Dunn was known as one of the "busiest scenario editors in Hollywood." A 1924 story in The Los Angeles Times quotes Dunn encouraging other writers to read many newspapers in order to "keep a metaphorical finger on the pulse of life everywhere."

With her quickly growing popularity, Dunn was recruited by actress Mary Pickford in 1925 to work collaboratively on future projects. The first collaboration of Dunn and Pickford was the 1926 hit Sparrows. The role played by Pickford was out of the ordinary for her often lighthearted work, and therefore was a significant driver for its success. The film was later criticized for copyright issues by Harry Hyde, who claimed the plot of Sparrows was eerily similar to his film The Cry of the Children, and sued both Dunn and Pickford for $100,000.

This was also the year Dunn's film Twinkletoes was released. Dunn had tough competition for her production of Twinkletoes to be performed by famous actress Colleen Moore. Based on the Thomas Burke book Twinkletoes: A Tale of the Limehouse, Dunn had to dig deep into her creative mind to create a film story that fit Moore, while staying relatively true to the original narrative. Dunn beat out the competition and production began a few weeks later.

Toward the close of 1926, Dunn signed a contract for long-term employment of writing scenarios with First National Pictures. It was here that she wrote the scenario for The Patent Leather Kid. To prepare for this assignment, she sat at a boxing ring every Friday night to gain a feel for what the production should be like. In April 1928, Dunn resigned from First National in order to pursue writing pieces with "more sentiment and less sentimentality."

Dunn remained a freelance writer into the sound era and continued her talents through other mediums as well. Dunn was hired to ghostwrite Osa Johnson's autobiography, I Married Adventure: The Lives and Adventures of Martin and Osa Johnson, which was released in 1940. Dunn applied her own spin to the facts found through extensive interviews and research of the story so readers could easily get "swept away." After its release, the book took off, selling 288,000 copies in the first eight months. In 1946 she co-authored the short play The Star-Baby with Bio De Casseres.

== Achievements ==
Dunn was of the youngest scenario editors in the film industry. In April 1928, Dunn took on the duties of chairman of the Women's Executive Committee of the Southern California Olympic Games. Later that year, Dunn was inducted into the writer's executive committee for the Academy of Motion Picture Arts and Sciences as the only female, and also served as a member of the Executive Board for the Writer's Guild.

== Personal life ==
In December 1928, Winifred Dunn announced her marriage to Harold Swartz, a successful sculptor. The ceremony was held in San Diego, and Dunn's mother was present. Contrary to popular norms of the time, Dunn did not let her marriage stop her career and continued to work as a freelance writer. After Dunn filed for divorce against Swartz in May 1942, records of her life stopped appearing in periodicals for public viewing.

== Filmography ==
Winifred Dunn has been credited as a screenwriter in 41 productions, as editor in three, and both screenwriter and editor in two.

| Title | Year | Credit | | Notes |
| Title | Year | Writer | Editor | Notes |
|---|---|---|---|---|
| Too Late | 1914 | Yes | No | Lost film |
| Out of the Depths | 1914 | Yes | No | Lost film |
| And the Children Pay | 1918 | Yes | No | scenario Lost film |
| Peg o' the Sea | 1918 | Yes | No | scenario Lost film |
| Human Passions | 1919 | Yes | Yes | story Lost film |
| It Happened In Paris | 1919 | Yes | No | scenario editor with Jack Cunningham and Sarah Bernhardt; Lost film |
| The Red Viper | 1919 | Yes | No | scenario and story Lost film |
| Thunderbolts of Fate | 1919 | Yes | No | scenario |
| Your Wife and Mine | 1919 | Yes | No | Lost film |
| Man and Woman | 1920 | No | Yes | titles Lost film |
| Garments of Truth | 1921 | Yes | No | uncredited Lost film |
| Silent Years | 1921 | Yes | No | scenario Lost film |
| The Glory of Clementina | 1922 | Yes | No | continuity Lost film |
| Little Eva Ascends | 1922 | Yes | No | Lost film |
| Two Kinds of Women | 1922 | Yes | No | scenario Lost film |
| Quincy Adams Sawyer | 1922 | No | Yes | Lost film |
| When Love Comes | 1922 | Yes | No | scenario Lost film |
| Held To Answer | 1923 | Yes | No | adaptation Lost film |
| In Search of a Thrill | 1923 | Yes | No | adaptation |
| Stormswept (Wreckage) | 1923 | Yes | No | scenario |
| The Eagle's Feather | 1923 | Yes | No | scenario |
| The Fog | 1923 | Yes | No | scenario Lost film |
| The Man Life Passed By | 1923 | Yes | No | scenario |
| Your Friend and Mine | 1923 | Yes | No | scenario Lost film |
| Along Came Ruth | 1924 | Yes | No | adaptation Lost film |
| The Shooting of Dan McGrew | 1924 | Yes | No | scenario with Barbara La Marr |
| Sandra | 1924 | Yes | No | Uncredited with Arthur H. Sawyer and Barbara La Marr; Lost film |
| The Beauty Prize | 1924 | No | Yes | continuity Lost film |
| Sparrows | 1926 | Yes | No | story |
| Twinkletoes | 1926 | Yes | No | scenario |
| Lonesome Ladies | 1927 | Yes | No | scenario Lost film |
| The Patent Leather Kid | 1927 | Yes | No | scenario |
| The Drop Kick | 1927 | Yes | No | adaptation |
| The Tender Hour | 1927 | Yes | No | scenario |
| Adoration | 1927 | Yes | No | scenario |
| Submarine | 1928 | Yes | No | scenario with Dorothy Howell and Norman Springer |
| Mamba | 1930 | Yes | No | continuity with Tom Miranda, John Reinhardt, and F. Schumann-Heink |
| Free Love | 1930 | Yes | No | continuity |
| Mother's Millions | 1931 | Yes | No | adaptation and screenplay |
| The Impatient Maiden | 1932 | Yes | No | screenplay |
| I Have Lived | 1933 | Yes | No | screenplay and dialogue |
| Rainbow Over Broadway | 1933 | Yes | No | adaptation and dialogue |
| Las fronteras del amor | 1934 | Yes | No | adaptation |
| I Give My Love | 1934 | Yes | No | uncredited |
