= Twinkletoes =

1926 film

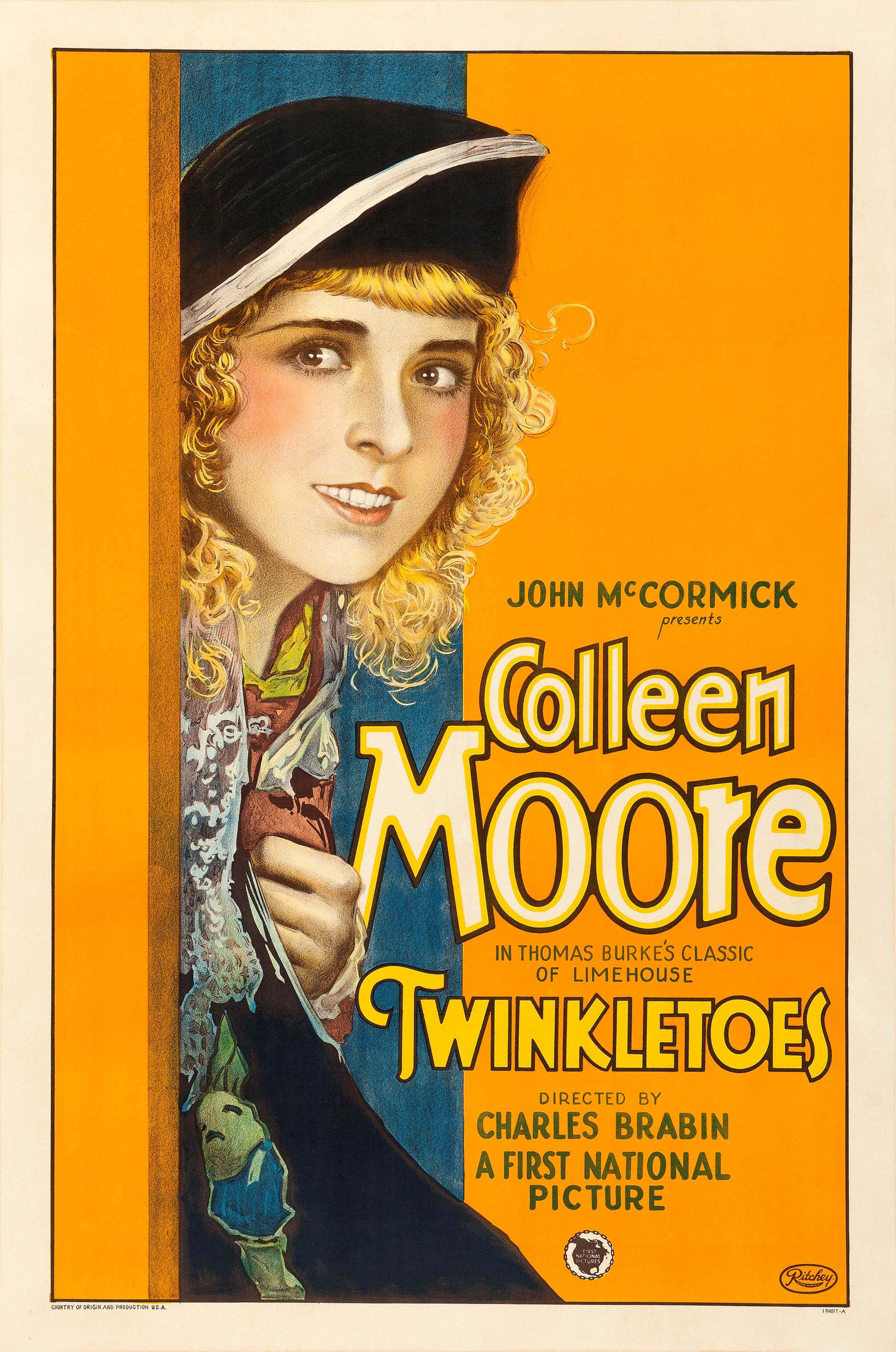
- Theatrical release poster
- Directed by: Charles Brabin
- Written by: Winifred Dunn (scenario); Mervyn LeRoy (Comedy const) (screenplay)
- Based on: Twinkletoes: A Tale of the Limehouse by Thomas Burke
- Produced by: John McCormick
- Starring: Colleen Moore; Kenneth Harlan; Tully Marshall; Gladys Brockwell
- Cinematography: James Van Trees
- Production company: First National
- Distributed by: First National
- Release date: November 28, 1926
- Running time: 80 minutes, 8 reels
- Country: United States
- Language: Silent (English intertitles)

Twinkletoes is a 1926 American silent romantic drama film directed by Charles Brabin and starring Colleen Moore. The film, as with most of Moore's vehicles at this time, was produced by her husband John McCormick with the couple distributing through Moore's resident studio First National. This film is one of Moore's surviving films from the late silent era and is available on DVD.

== Plot ==
Twinkletoes (1926)

Monica "Twinkletoes" Minasi, a motherless child of the London Limehouse district, is a brilliant young dancer who lives in poverty. She saves a crowd from abuse by the police through an impromptu performance, during which she meets Chuck Lightfoot, a champion fighter and older married man whose wife, Cissie, was the cause of the ruckus. Twinks finds herself slowly falling in love with Chuck but resists, because he is married and much older (he is in his late twenties, she might be as young as 15), but when he saves her from an attack one night she realizes that it is useless to fight her feelings.

She dances at the head of the "Quayside Kids," a local dance group in a music hall run by Roseleaf, who has designs on the young girls that dance for him. Chuck's wife Cissie realizes that her husband had feelings for Twinks and, learning that Twink's dad is a burglar, exposes him to the police. Twinks is distraught when she learns the news that her father—whom she admired above all other people—is a criminal. Roseleaf takes her to his apartment and attempts to have his way with her, but she manages to escape. Cissie is killed in an accident, and, in despair, Twink throws herself into the river. She is rescued by Chuck and in his arms finds something to live for.

== Cast ==
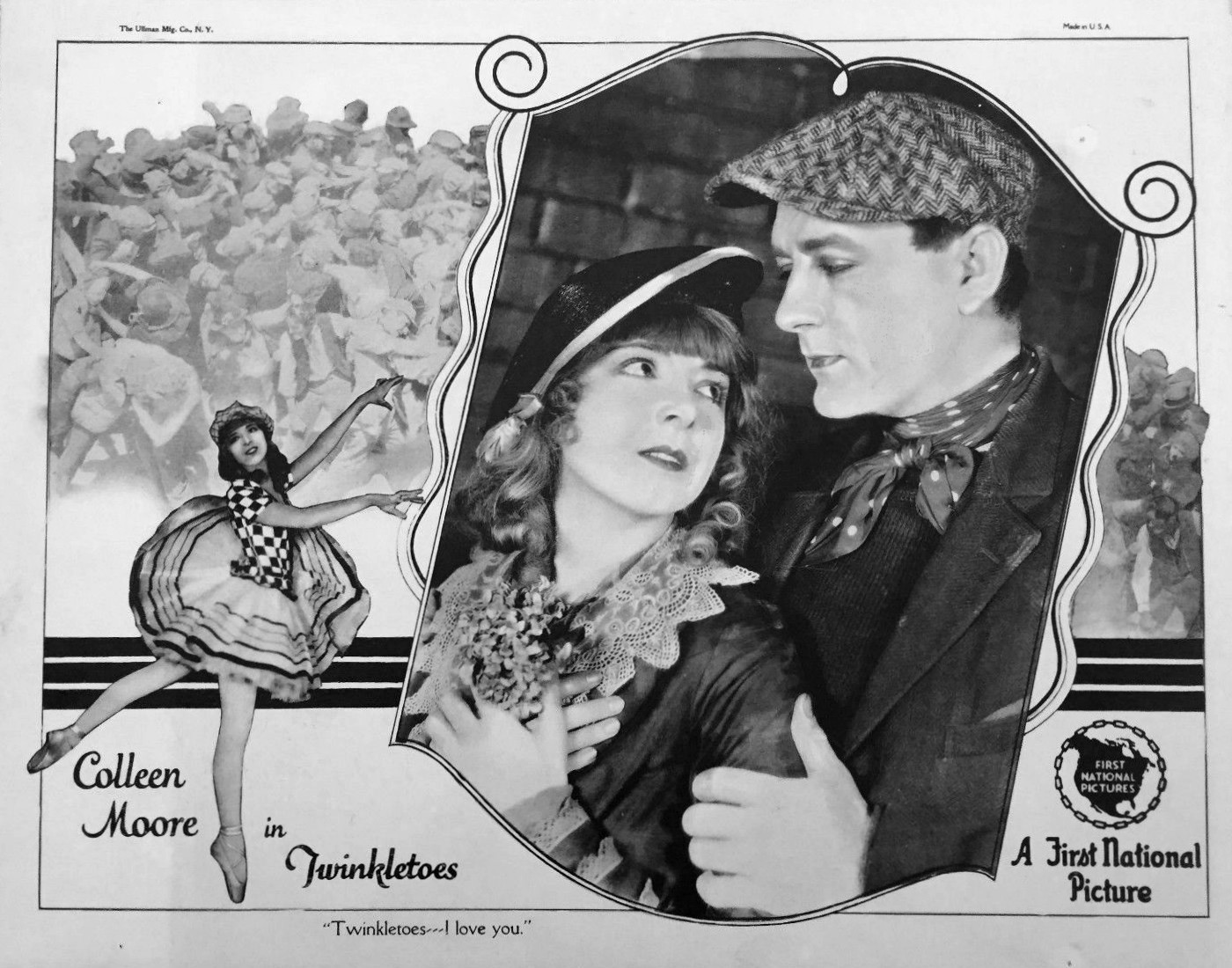
Lobby card with Colleen Moore and Kenneth Harlan

- Colleen Moore as Twinkletoes
- Kenneth Harlan as Chuck Lightfoot
- Tully Marshall as Dad Minasi
- Gladys Brockwell as Cissie Lightfoot
- Lucien Littlefield as Hank
- Warner Oland as Roseleaf
- John Kolb as Bill Carsides (credited as John Philip Kolb)
- Julanne Johnston as Lilac
- William McDonald as Police Inspector Territon
- Dorothy Vernon (unknown role)
- Ned Sparks (unknown role)
- Dick Sutherland (unknown role)
- Carl Stockdale (unknown role)
- Aggie Herring (woman selling flowers)
- J. Gunnis Davis (unknown role) (uncredited)
- Willie Fung as Chinaman (uncredited)
- Martha Mattox as Wardrobe Woman (uncredited)
- Nell O'Day as Ballerina in Teacup (uncredited)
- Matthew Bobo as Police Officer

== Production ==
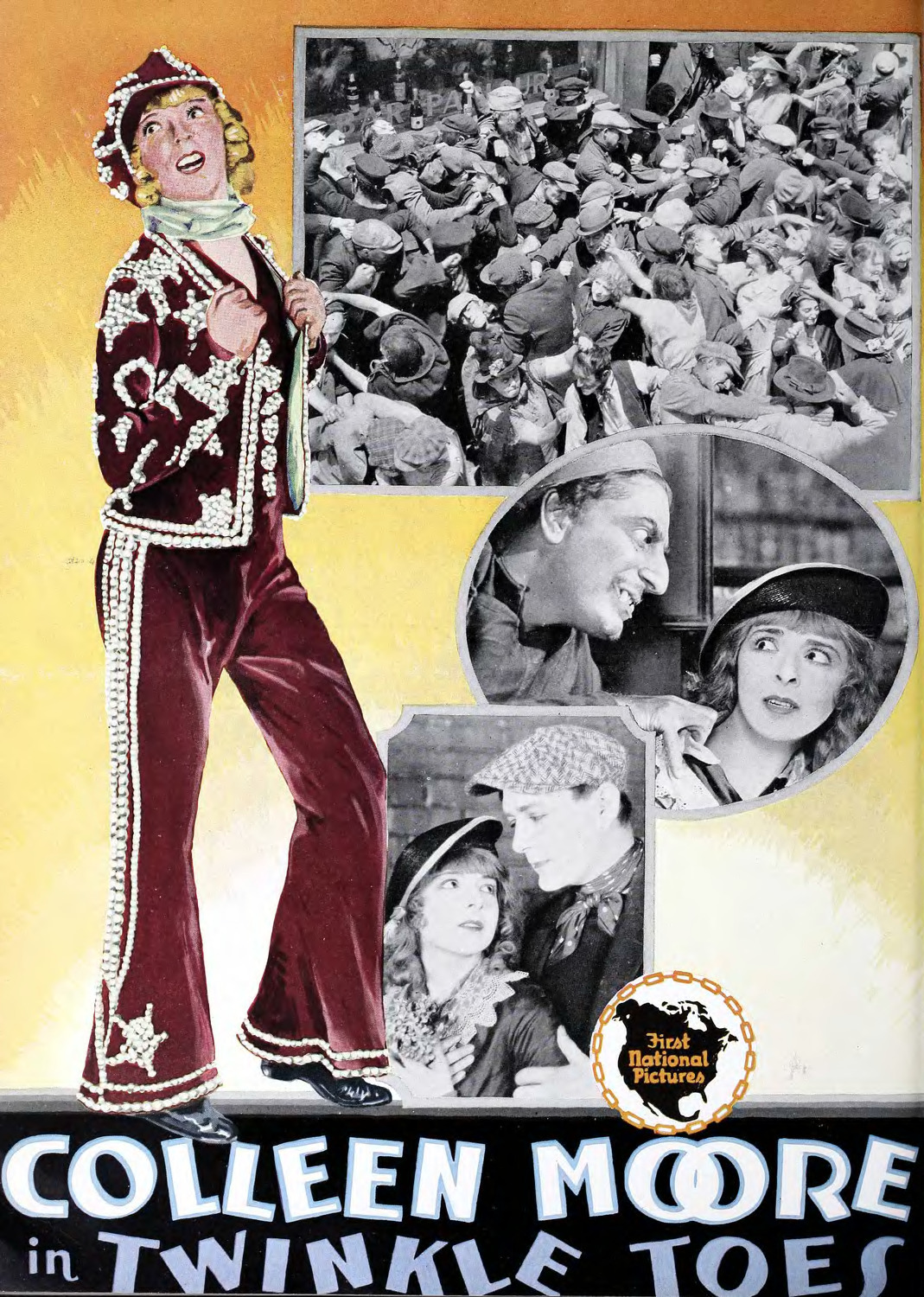
Twinkle Toes ad in Exhibitors Herald, 1926

Scenario writer Winifred Dunn did research in San Francisco's Chinatown for the atmosphere of the film.

The movie was based on the 1918 novel Twinkletoes: A Tale of the Limehouse, by Thomas Burke. Like the book, the film's original story had a dramatic ending, with Twinks drowning in the river. Colleen's husband did not believe that the original ending would play as well as a happy ending, perhaps worried that the production might not be well received by audiences, as had been the case with the dramatic So Big. Two endings were filmed and exhibitors were allowed to pick which version they wanted to show. The audiences generally preferred the sad ending.

This was Colleen's first "serious" film since her portrayal of Salena Peake in So Big. Coleen danced several of the numbers in the film herself. The film came between two of her comedies, as it was the studio's strategy to stagger her comedies and dramatic roles, so that the public would not become tired of any single genre.

== Footnotes ==
- Jeff Codori (2012), Colleen Moore; A Biography of the Silent Film Star, McFarland Publishing, (Print ISBN 978-0-7864-4969-9, EBook ISBN 978-0-7864-8899-5).
