= El rey de los gitanos =

1933 film directed by Frank R. Strayer

- Directed by: Frank Strayer
- Screenplay by: Paul Perez; Llewellyn Hughes; José López Rubio
- Produced by: John Stone
- Starring: José Mojica; Rosita Moreno; Julio Villarreal
- Cinematography: Robert Planck
- Production company: Fox Film Corporation
- Distributed by: Fox Film Corporation
- Release date: May 23, 1933
- Running time: 82 minutes
- Country: United States
- Language: Spanish

El rey de los gitanos, was a 1933 American Spanish language comedy-drama film directed by Frank Strayer, which stars José Mojica, Rosita Moreno, and Julio Villarreal. The screenplay was written by Paul Perez, Llewellyn Hughes, and José López Rubio. It was produced and distributed by Fox Films, and premiered in Barcelona, Spain on May 23, 1933. Its U.S. premiere occurred three days later in Los Angeles on May 26.

== Cast list ==
- José Mojica as Karol
- Rosita Moreno as Princess María Luisa
- Julio Villarreal as El Gran Duque Alejandro
- Romualdo Tirado as Remetz
- Ada Lozano as Renée
- Antonio Vidal as Primer ministro
- Martín Garralaga as Gregor
- Paco Moreno as Cabo
