= Stamboul (film) =

1932 film directed by Dimitri Buchowetzki

- Directed by: Dimitri Buchowetzki
- Written by: Heinz Goldberg; Harry Kahn; Henry Koster; Reginald Denham
- Based on: Stamboul; 1922 novel 1931 play by Claude Farrère (novel); Pierre Frondaie (play)
- Produced by: Walter Morosco
- Starring: Warwick Ward; Rosita Moreno; Margot Grahame
- Music by: Percival Mackey
- Production company: Paramount British Pictures
- Distributed by: Paramount British Pictures
- Release date: 28 March 1932
- Running time: 75 minutes
- Country: United Kingdom
- Language: English

Stamboul is a 1932 British drama film directed by Dimitri Buchowetzki and starring Warwick Ward, Rosita Moreno, Margot Grahame, and Garry Marsh. It was shot at the Elstree Studios outside London. It was released by the British division of Paramount Pictures. The film's sets were designed by the art director Heinrich Richter, Hermann Warm and R. Holmes Paul. The film is based on the novel L'homme qui assasina (1906) by Claude Farrère and on a play by Pierre Frondaie. Buchowetski also co-directed El hombre que asesinó with Fernando Gomis, the Spanish-language version of the film, also released by Paramount.

== Premise ==
In the lead-up to the First World War, a French military attaché falls in love with the wife of a prominent German in Stamboul (the central part of Constantinople, now known in entirety as Istanbul) in the Ottoman Empire.

== Cast ==
- Warwick Ward as Col André de Sevigne
- Rosita Moreno as Baroness von Strick
- Margot Grahame as Countess Elsa Talven
- Henry Charles Hewitt as Baron von Strick
- Garry Marsh as Prince Cernuwitz
- Alan Napier as Bouchier
- Abraham Sofaer as Mahmed Pasha
- Stella Arbenina as Mme. Bouchier
- Annie Esmond as Nurse
- Eric Pavitt as Franz
