= Under Your Spell (film) =

1936 film by Otto Preminger

- Directed by: Otto Preminger
- Screenplay by: Frances Hyland; Saul Elkins
- Story by: Sy Bartlett; Bernice Mason
- Produced by: John Stone
- Starring: Lawrence Tibbett; Wendy Barrie
- Cinematography: Sidney Wagner
- Edited by: Fred Allen
- Music by: Arthur Lange; Charles Maxwell
- Distributed by: 20th Century Fox
- Release date: November 6, 1936
- Running time: 62 minutes
- Country: United States
- Language: English

Under Your Spell is a 1936 American romantic comedy film with music directed by Otto Preminger. The screenplay by Frances Hyland and Saul Elkins is based on a story by Sy Bartlett and Bernice Mason. It was a remake of the American Spanish-language film, Las fronteras del amor. It was Preminger's first Hollywood movie.

== Plot ==
New York City opera star Anthony Allen lives a privileged but controlled life, recording hit songs and drawing large crowds to performances while existing in constant strain with his agent Petroff, who imposes on him a stressful performance schedule and a near-constant chain of vacuous promotional stunts. Chicago socialite Cynthia Drexel sees Allen perform in a production of Gounod's Faust and makes a bet with her longtime suitor, the Count Raul du Rienne: either she can make the notoriously unavailable Allen sing at a private party, or else she will marry him. After the show, Drexel makes a deal with Petroff, offering him $15,000 ($288,187 in 2021 dollars) as a fee for his appearance at a private party. Not knowing of this new arrangement, Allen is especially insulted by one final publicity stunt, fires Petroff, and flees with devoted manservant Botts, first to his hometown in New Mexico, then to his secluded cabin in the Sierra Madres. Neither Petroff nor Botts can convince him to return to his life as a public figure, forcing Drexel to set out in her own private plane to find him.

Drexel confronts Allen in the Sierra Madres, where she fails to convince him to return, but does attract his romantic interest. The two spend a tense but romantically charged weekend together, until a misunderstanding compels Cynthia to hastily leave. Now intrigued, Allen returns to Chicago with her belongings. He finds Drexel furious; she criticizes his singing and (falsely) tells him she has no romantic interest in him, as she is engaged to Count Du Rienne. Cynthia sues him for breach of contract, but in court Anthony argues that he refused to sing for her because of her lack of appreciation for his talent, and the case is dismissed. Drexel and Allen, each of whom have realized the depth of their feelings for each other, arrange to meet outside the courtroom. Allen conceals himself in a doorway, and when Drexel walks by, he pulls her inside and proceeds to viciously spank her. They emerge a happy couple. Petroff calls a press conference at which he announces their union, and the couple signs their marriage license.

== Cast ==
- Lawrence Tibbett as Anthony Allen
- Wendy Barrie as Cynthia Drexel
- Gregory Ratoff as Petroff
- Arthur Treacher as Botts
- Gregory Gaye as Count Raul Du Rienne
- Charles Richman as Uncle Bob

== Production ==
Otto Preminger had been working as an apprentice at 20th Century Fox for nearly eight months when studio head Darryl F. Zanuck assigned him to the film, a remake of the Spanish language release Las fronteras del amor, which Frank R. Strayer had directed for Fox two years earlier. Zanuck had opera baritone Lawrence Tibbett under contract, and following the commercial failure of the high-budget Metropolitan in 1935, he was anxious to rid himself of the singer and thought Preminger could serve as his hatchet man. Tibbett was aware of Zanuck's feelings and didn't blame the director, who was anxious to helm a film, for accepting the assignment, and he proved to be amiable both on and off the set.

Filming began under the title Love Flight in mid-August 1936, soon after Preminger filed his Declaration of Intention to become a naturalized American citizen. Well under budget and ahead of schedule, principal photography was completed on September 15, and Zanuck was so pleased with Preminger's efficiency he signed him to a one-year contract at $1,000 per week, effective October 6. Prior to the film's release, its title was changed to Under Your Spell, after one of three songs Arthur Schwartz and Howard Dietz had written for the score, the other two being "My Little Mule Wagon" and "Amigo." Tibbett also performed "Largo al factotum" from The Barber of Seville and "Le veau d'or" from Faust in the film, which proved to be his last.

The film opens with a lengthy tracking shot in a recording studio that established Preminger's preference for allowing camera movement to bind together all the elements of a scene. In another sequence, set during a trial, the director presaged his 1959 film Anatomy of a Murder with his use of loud, overlapping dialogue to create a sense of courtroom reality.

== Critical reception ==
In his review in The New York Times, Bosley Crowther noted that the film had been released as the second feature of a double bill and commented, "The picture itself is not nearly as black as this fortuitous circumstance has painted it." He praised Lawrence Tibbett's voice, calling it "the richest, the most dramatic, the most beautifully controlled vocal instrument on the contemporary screen, and no amount of soldiering by the Messrs. Schwartz and Dietz can disguise this amazing and gratifying phenomenon." In closing, he said, "Mr. Tibbett acquits himself as satisfactorily as could well be expected. The fact that the Tibbett voice could stand a more studiously thought-out setting will hardly be contested by any one."
