= One Mad Kiss =

1930 film

- Directed by: Marcel Silver; James Tinling
- Written by: Dudley Nichols; Adolf Paul (play)
- Starring: José Mojica; Mona Maris; Antonio Moreno
- Cinematography: Ross Fisher; Charles Van Enger
- Edited by: Louis R. Loeffler
- Music by: R.H. Bassett; Peter Brunelli
- Production company: Fox Film
- Distributed by: Fox Film
- Release date: July 13, 1930
- Running time: 64 minutes
- Country: United States
- Language: English

One Mad Kiss is a 1930 American musical film directed by Marcel Silver and James Tinling and starring José Mojica, Mona Maris and Antonio Moreno. The film was not a commercial success and lost $263,000 on its release. A separate Spanish-language version El precio de un beso was also released.

It is now considered to be a lost film.

== Cast ==
- José Mojica as José Salvedra
- Mona Maris as Rosario
- Antonio Moreno as Don Estrada
- Tom Patricola as Paco

== Bibliography ==
- Jarvinen, Lisa. The Rise of Spanish-language Filmmaking: Out from Hollywood's Shadow, 1929-1939. Rutger's University Press, 2012.
- Solomon, Aubrey. The Fox Film Corporation, 1915-1935: A History and Filmography. McFarland, 2011.
