= Blazing Sixes =

1937 film by Noel M. Smith

- Theatrical release poster
- Directed by: Noel M. Smith
- Screenplay by: John T. Neville
- Story by: Anthony Coldeway
- Produced by: Bryan Foy
- Starring: Dick Foran; Joan Valerie; Mira McKinney; John Merton; Glenn Strange; Kenneth Harlan
- Cinematography: Ted D. McCord
- Edited by: Frederick Richards
- Music by: Howard Jackson
- Production company: Warner Bros. Pictures
- Distributed by: Warner Bros. Pictures
- Release date: June 12, 1937
- Running time: 55 minutes
- Country: United States
- Language: English

Blazing Sixes is a 1937 American Western film directed by Noel M. Smith and written by John T. Neville. The film stars Dick Foran, Joan Valerie, Mira McKinney, John Merton, Glenn Strange and Kenneth Harlan. It was the 9th of 12 B-westerns Foran starred in for the studio, and is noteworthy for giving perennial villain Strange a rare good-guy role as the simple-minded cowhand Pee Wee. The film was released by Warner Bros. Pictures on June 12, 1937.

== Plot ==
Government agent Red Barton goes into a small Western town in order to find the source of recent gold robberies, and Barbara Morgan who goes into the city to claim a ranch that is part of her inheritance, but that also serves as the headquarters of an outlaw gang.

== Cast ==
- Dick Foran as Red Barton
- Joan Valerie as Barbara Morgan (billed as Helen Valkis)
- Mira McKinney as Aunt Sarah
- John Merton as Jim Hess
- Glenn Strange as Peewee (misspelled as Glen Strange)
- Kenneth Harlan as Major Taylor
- Milton Kibbee as Mort
- Gordon Hart as Gore
- Henry Otho as Chuck
- Wilfred Lucas as Sheriff Tom
- Bud Osborne as Dave
- Tom Foreman as Buck
- Ben Corbett as Slim
- Malcolm Waite as Jamison
- Bob Burns as Mike
- Jack Mower as Wells Fargo Agent
