= No Man's Gold =

1926 film

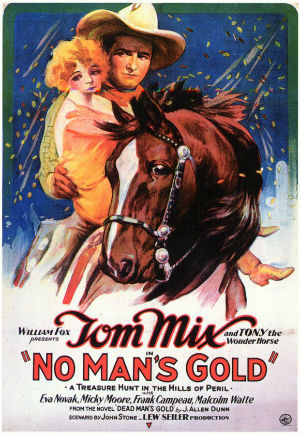
- Theatrical release poster
- Directed by: Lewis Seiler
- Screenplay by: John Stone
- Based on: No Man's Gold by J. Allan Dunn
- Starring: Tom Mix; Eva Novak; Frank Campeau; Mickey Moore; Malcolm Waite; Forrest Taylor
- Cinematography: Daniel B. Clark
- Production company: Fox Film Corporation
- Distributed by: Fox Film Corporation
- Release date: August 29, 1926
- Running time: 60 minutes
- Country: United States
- Language: Silent (English intertitles)

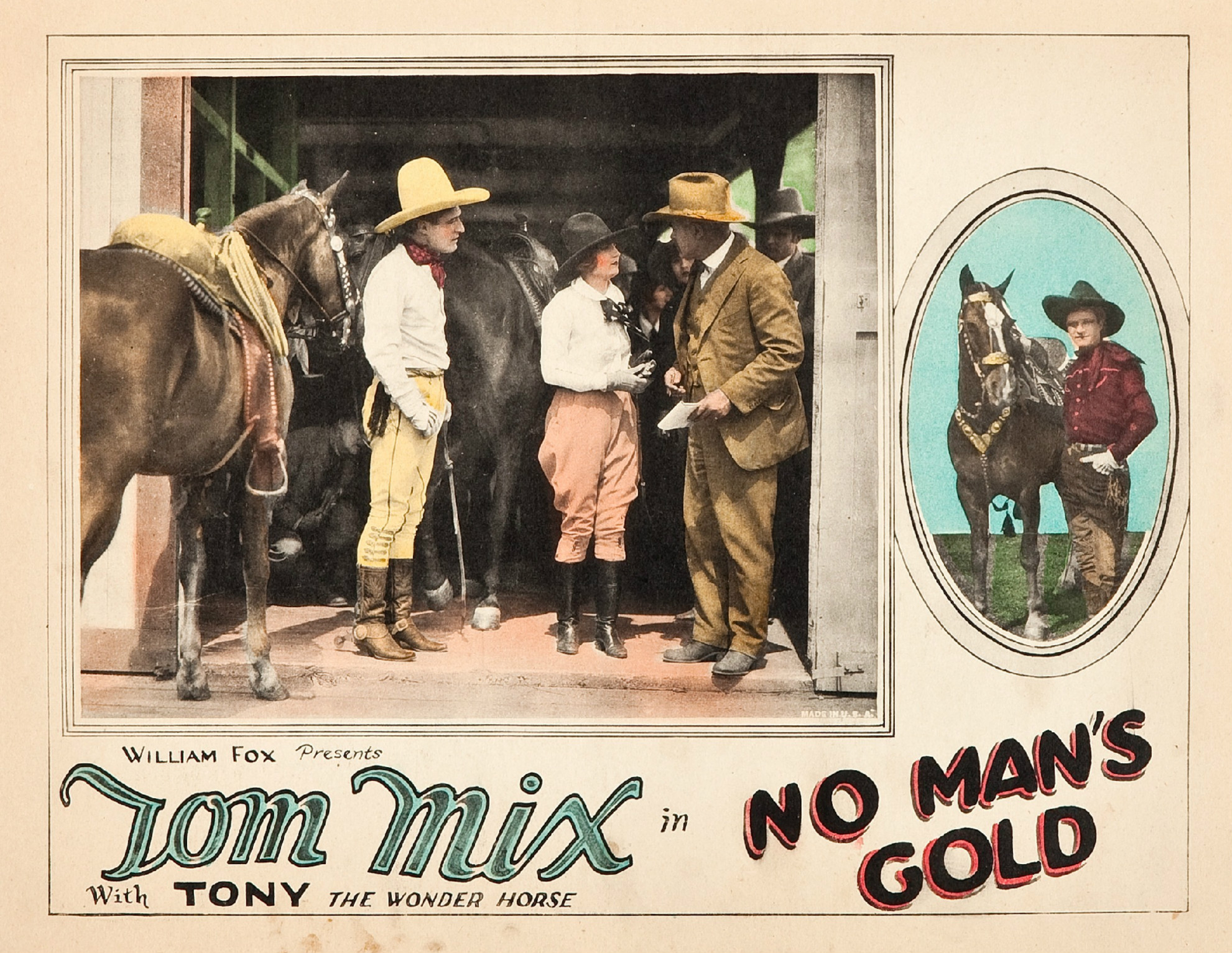

No Man's Gold is a 1926 American silent Western film directed by Lewis Seiler and written by John Stone. The film stars Tom Mix, Eva Novak, Frank Campeau, Mickey Moore, Malcolm Waite, and Forrest Taylor. The film was released on August 29, 1926, by Fox Film Corporation.

== Plot ==
The central plot revolves around an ailing prospector who splits the map to his gold mine into three sections: one for the outlaw who wounded him (Frank Campeau), another for the comedic sidekick Harry Grippe, and the third for the protagonist, Mix. Alongside safeguarding the miner's newly orphaned son (Mickey Moore), Mix must also race against time to reach the mine before his adversaries.

== Cast ==
- Tom Mix as Tom Stone
- Tony the Wonder Horse as Tony, Tom's Horse
- Eva Novak as Jane Rogers
- Frank Campeau as Frank Healy
- Mickey Moore as Jimmy Rogers
- Malcolm Waite as Pete Krell
- Forrest Taylor as Wat Lyman
- Harry Gripp as Lefty Logan

== Preservation ==
A print of No Man's Gold is held in the Národní filmový archiv in Prague.
