= San Gabriel, Jalisco =

San Gabriel
- Municipality and town
- Coat of arms
- Motto(s): Noble, Culta, Y Leal.
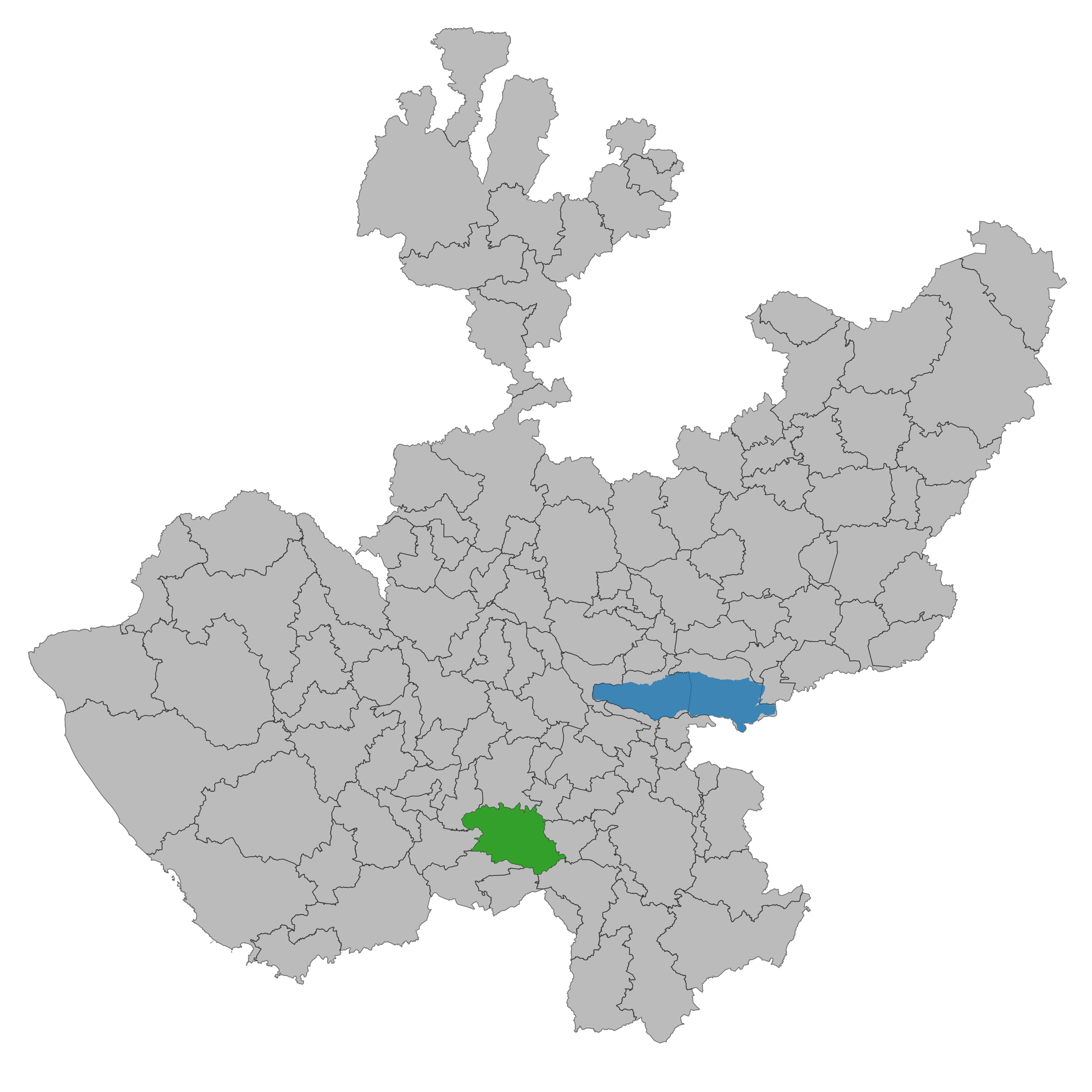
- Location of the municipality in Jalisco

- Location in Mexico
- Coordinates: 19°44′50″N 103°46′00″W
- Country: Mexico
- State: Jalisco

Government
  - Type: Representative democracy
  - Municipal president: David Rafael Valencia García; MC

Area
  - Total: 746.1 km^{2} (288.1 sq mi)
  - Town: 3.04 km^{2} (1.17 sq mi)

Population (2020 census)
  - Total: 16,548
  - Density: 22.18/km^{2} (57.44/sq mi)
  - Town: 5,109
  - Town density: 1,680/km^{2} (4,350/sq mi)
- Time zone: UTC-6 (Central Standard Time)

San Gabriel is a town and municipality, in Jalisco in central-western Mexico 141 km from the capital of Guadalajara (formerly Ciudad Venustiano Carranza). The municipality covers an area of 746.1 km^{2}. It was the birthplace of Mexican actor José Mojica, with the main street carrying his name. Its delegations include Jiquilpan and other surrounding towns. As of 1 October 2021, David Rafael Valencia García, of the Citizens' Movement, holds power as municipal president. The towns economy is mostly agricultural/commercial, but services, as is in the rest of Mexico are rapidly becoming part of the mainstream economy. Tourism remains domestic as about 10-15% of the towns resident born from 1955-1970 have moved to the United States of America or Canada at a period in time since 1986. The towns geographical location places it in visible sight of Colima (volcano), and within an hour to two hours drive from neighboring state, Colima.

As of 2011, the municipality had a total population of 14,939.
