= Las fronteras del amor =

1934 film directed by Frank R. Strayer

- Advertisement for the film
- Directed by: Frank Strayer
- Screenplay by: Winifred Dunn; Miguel de Zárraga
- Story by: Bernice Mason
- Produced by: John Stone
- Starring: José Mojica; Rosita Moreno; Rafael Corio
- Cinematography: Arthur Martinelli
- Edited by: Ernest Nims
- Music by: Samuel Kaylin
- Production company: Fox Film Corporation
- Distributed by: Fox Film Corporation
- Release date: November 30, 1934
- Running time: 82 minutes
- Country: United States
- Language: Spanish

Las fronteras del amor (English: Love's Frontiers) is a 1934 American Spanish language romance film directed by Frank Strayer, which stars José Mojica, Rosita Moreno, and Rafael Corio. The screenplay was written by Winifred Dunn and Miguel de Zárraga, from a screenplay by Bernice Mason.

== Plot ==
Weary from his tour, famous opera singer Miguel Segovia returns to his family's ranch in Mexico to get away for a while. While there, he is asked by the family's shepherd, José López, to watch his flock while he woos a local woman, Maria. After José leaves, a plane which has run out of fuel makes an emergency landing in a nearby field. The plane is piloted by Alice Harrison, an heiress, who mistakes Miguel for a farmhand, which he does not disabuse her of that misunderstanding. When José realizes who Miguel really is, he returns to the cabin, but Miguel sends him to get fuel for the plane. Over the next two days, they fall in love, but Alice believes that their difference in social class would be too great of an obstacle to overcome.

José returns with the fuel, and the next morning, before Miguel can stop her, Alice takes off to return home. Back in Los Angeles, Alice is proposed to by Otto Van Ritter, but she turns him down. She talks to her Uncle Fred, who encourages her to follow her heart. She writes a letter to "José", still believing that that is Miguel's name.

Meanwhile, Miguel's agent, Harry, has convinced Miguel to go back on tour. Alice receives a letter from Maria, which is full of outrage of Alice's interest in her now-husband, José. Despondent, when Otto proposes again, Alice accepts. Despite several other twists of mistaken identity, Miguel eventually proposes to Alice, and she accepts.

== Cast ==
- José Mojica as Miguel Segovia
- Rosita Moreno as Alice Harrison
- Rafael Corio as Gastón Garnier
- Juan Martínez Plá as Tío Fred
- Alma Real as Señora Harrison
- Rudolf Amendt as Otto Van Ritter
- Chito Alonso as José López
- Gloria de la Vega as María
- Lola Montero as Fermina
- Jesús Macías as Pedro

== Production ==
During production, the film underwent several name changes, including En alas del amor and El vuelo del amor. In Mexico, it was released as ¡Viva mi tierra!. The picture was re-made, in English, in 1936 as Under Your Spell.

== Reception ==
The Film Daily gave the film a positive review, "Entertaining romance giving Jose Mojica an opportunity to sing some pleasing numbers. Production is excellent all around."
