= Troy Sanders (composer) =

American composer (1901–1959)

- Born: December 7, 1901; Illinois, U.S.
- Died: May 3, 1959 (aged 57) Burbank, California, U.S.
- Occupation(s): Arranger, composer, lyricist
- Years active: 1930–1959

Troy Sanders (December 7, 1901 – May 3, 1959) was an American composer and musician who worked in the Hollywood industry from 1930 through 1959.

For 30 years, Sanders worked steadily in Hollywood since the first talkies hit the screen, contributing to different areas of the music department, while working mostly as an advisor for composers such as Irving Berlin, Johnny Burke, Frederick Hollander, John Leipold, Alfred Newman, Walter Scharf, Jimmy Van Heusen, Franz Waxman and Victor Young, among others.

== Selected filmography ==
- Beau Geste (1939)
- The Great McGinty (1940)
- Going My Way (1943)
- Riding High (1943)
- Incendiary Blonde (1945)
- The Affairs of Susan (1945)
- The Stork Club (1945)
- Blue Skies (1946)
- Road to Rio (1947)
- The Perils of Pauline (1947)
- Variety Girl (1947)
- Isn't It Romantic? (1947)
- The Emperor Waltz (1948)
- A Connecticut Yankee in King Arthur's Court (1949)
- Red, Hot and Blue (1949)
- Top o' the Morning (1949)
- Let's Dance (1950)
- Mr. Music (1950)
- Riding High (1950)
- My Favorite Spy (1951)
- The Lemon Drop Kid (1951)
- Stalag 17 (1953)
- We're No Angels (1955)
- King Creole (1958)
- The Five Pennies (1959)
