= Rosita Moreno =

Spanish actress

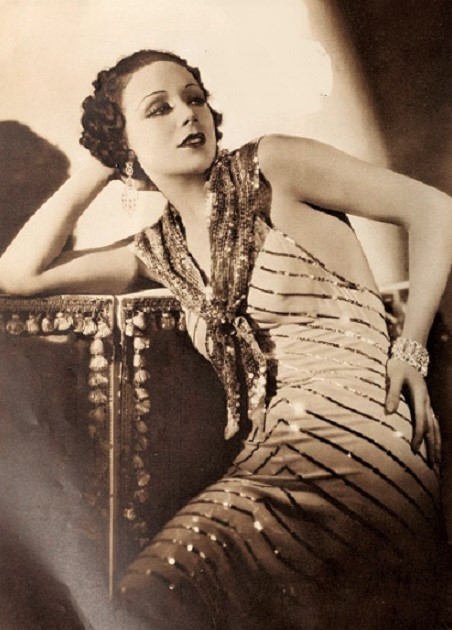
- Moreno in 1934
- Born: Gabriela Victoria Viñolas; 18 March 1907; Madrid, Spain
- Died: 25 April 1993 (aged 86); Hollywood, Los Angeles, California, U.S.
- Occupation: Actress
- Notable work: El día que me quieras (1935)

Rosita Moreno (born Gabriela Victoria Viñolas; March 18, 1907 – April 25, 1993) was a Spanish film actress who worked in cinema in Hollywood, Argentina, Mexico, and in her native Spain.

== Biography ==
Born in Madrid, Spain, Moreno was the daughter of Spanish character actor Francisco Moreno, who also developed a Hollywood career. As a child she devoted herself to acting in revue and zarzuela genres.

Moreno appeared in more than 30 films in a career that spanned more than 20 years, often travelling through several countries in quick succession. She made her screen debut alongside her father in the 1930 film Amor audaz, co-starring Adolphe Menjou. The same year she appeared in the Spanish-language version of Paramount on Parade, released by Paramount Pictures. In 1931, she co-starred in Stamboul, released by Paramount British. In 1935, Moreno paired with Carlos Gardel in two significant films, El día que me quieras and Tango Bar. The same year, she was selected for the main role in Piernas de seda.

She also worked with Richard Arlen (The Santa Fe Trail, 1930), Clara Bow (Her Wedding Night, 1930), Cary Grant (Ladies Should Listen, 1934), and Noël Coward (The Scoundrel, 1935), among others.

She made her last appearance in 1949 in an episode of The Clock, a suspense/anthology TV-series based on an ABC Radio Network series which ran from 1946 through 1948. In this episode she shared leading roles with George Reeves. Little is known about her after that point.

Rosita Moreno died in 1993 in Hollywood, Los Angeles, at the age of 86 from undisclosed causes.

== Selected filmography ==
- Paramount on Parade (1930)
- El rey de los gitanos (1933)
- Walls of Gold (1933)
- Las fronteras del amor (1934)
- The House of a Thousand Candles (1936)
- Tengo fe en ti (1940)
- A Medal for Benny (1945)
