= Red Hot Tires (1925 film) =

1925 film directed by Erle C. Kenton

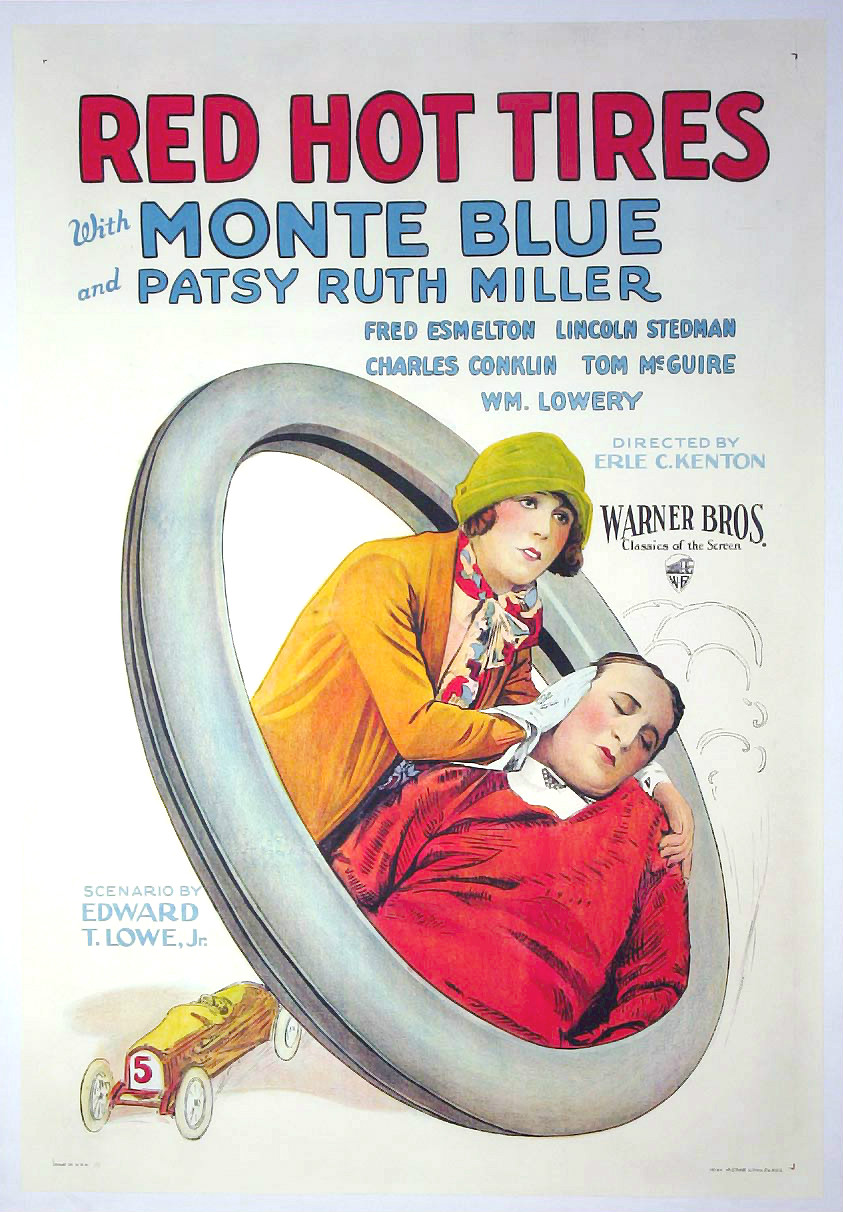
- Theatrical release poster
- Directed by: Erle C. Kenton
- Written by: Edward T. Lowe Jr. (scenario)
- Story by: Gregory Rogers (Darryl F. Zanuck)
- Produced by: Harry Warner
- Starring: Monte Blue; Patsy Ruth Miller
- Cinematography: Charles Van Enger
- Production company: Warner Bros.
- Distributed by: Warner Bros.
- Release date: October 31, 1925
- Running time: 7 reels (6,660 feet)
- Country: United States
- Language: Silent (English intertitles)

Red Hot Tires is a 1925 American silent comedy film produced and released by Warner Bros.. The film was based on a story written by Darryl F. Zanuck, under the pseudonym Gregory Rogers, and directed by Erle C. Kenton. The film stars Monte Blue and Patsy Ruth Miller.

Ten years later, Warner Bros. released 1935 film with the same title, which unrelated to the 1925 version.

== Plot ==
As described in a review in a film magazine, Al Jones sees an Elizabeth Lowden and becomes so infatuated with her that he runs his car into a steam roller. As he expresses it afterwards, every time he sees her something happens. Her father is chief of police and, to cure her of speeding, he puts her in jail. Jones demands the same treatment and is accommodated, but gets out first and strives to get back in only to find that the young woman has been released. He then has a hard time getting out.

Crooks kidnap Elizabeth and Jones, overcoming his fear of automobiles since his first accident, gives chase, fights all over the house in which they take refuge, and finally licks the crooks and wins the affections of Elizabeth.

== Cast ==
- Monte Blue as Al Jones
- Patsy Ruth Miller as Elizabeth Lowden
- Fred Esmelton as Honorable R. C. Lowden
- Lincoln Stedman as George Taylor
- Heinie Conklin as Coachman
- James Quinn as Al Martin
- Tom McGuire as Crook
- William Lowery as Crook
- Malcolm Waite as Crook

== Preservation ==
A copy of Red Hot Tires is preserved in the Library of Congress collection.
