= The Hater of Men =

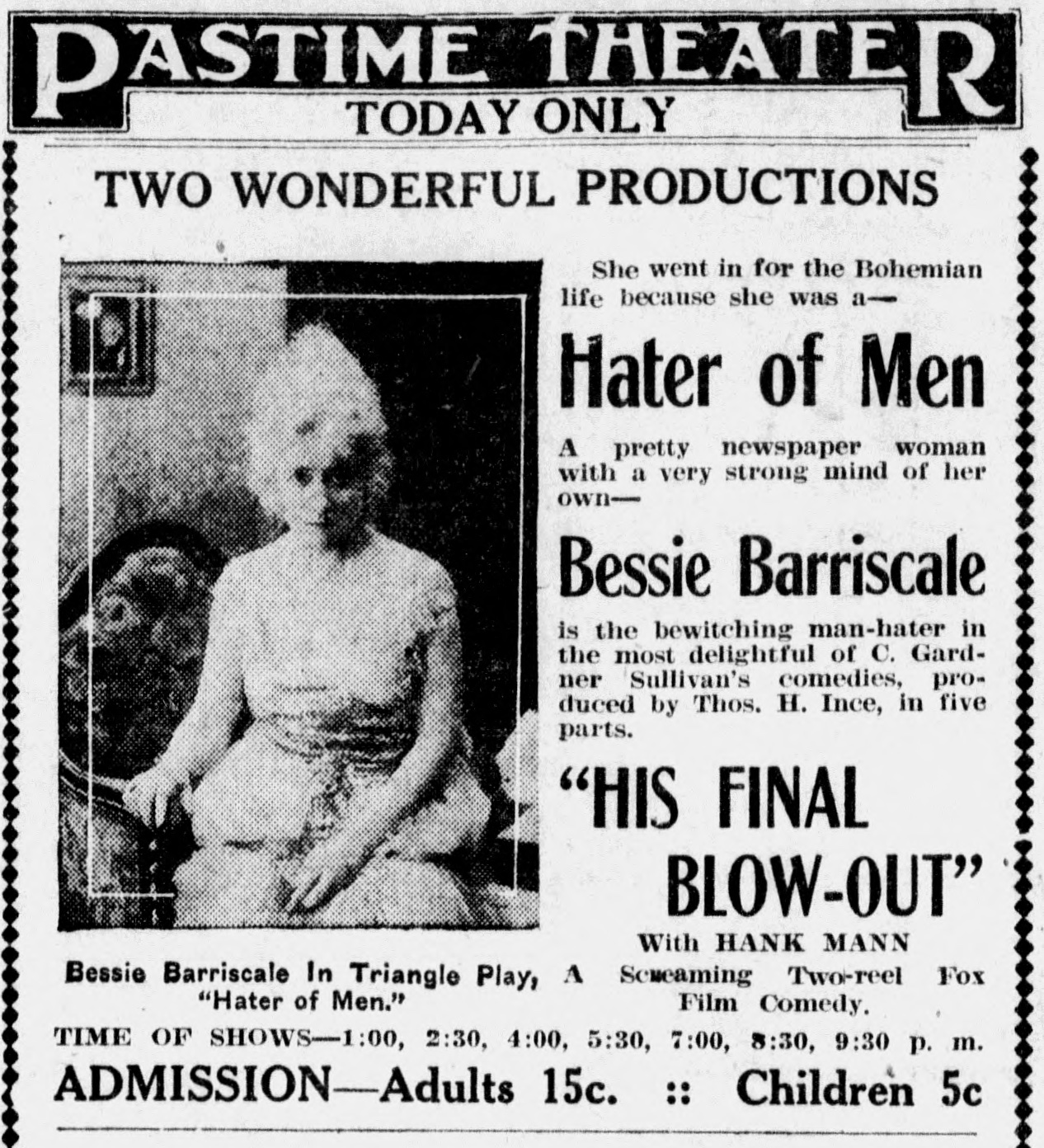
- Contemporary advertisement
- Directed by: Charles Miller
- Written by: C. Gardner Sullivan
- Produced by: Thomas H. Ince
- Starring: Bessie Barriscale
- Cinematography: Clyde De Vinna
- Production companies: Kay-Bee Pictures; New York Motion Picture Company
- Distributed by: Triangle Film Corporation
- Release date: July 1, 1917
- Running time: 50 minutes
- Country: USA
- Languages: Silent; English titles

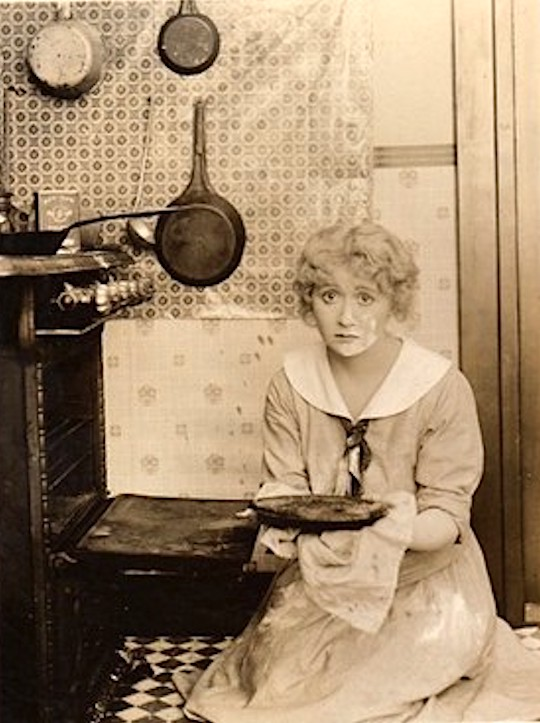
Bessie Barriscale in a scene from the film.

The Hater of Men is a 1917 American silent drama film directed by Charles Miller and starring Bessie Barriscale. It was produced by Kay-Bee Pictures and by Triangle Distributing.

== Plot ==
The character, Janice Salsbury, a reporter, becomes disillusioned with the institution of marriage believing it will cause her to lose her freedom and breaks off her engagement with her beau. After several plot twists she is reunited and marries her fiancee.

== Cast ==
- Bessie Barriscale - Janice Salsbury
- Charles K. French - Phillips Hartley
- John Gilbert - Billy Williams (*as Jack Gilbert)

== Preservation ==
A complete 35 mm print of The Hater of Men is held by the Library of Congress.
