= Willis Robards =

American actor, film director and producer

- Born: Willis Lewis Robards; 1873; U.S.
- Died: November 3, 1921 (aged 47–48); Hollywood, California, U.S.
- Burial place: Hollywood Forever Cemetery
- Other names: Walter Edwards
- Occupation: Actor

Willis Lewis Robards (1873 – November 3, 1921), also known as Walter Edwards, was an American actor, film director, and film producer. He acted in stage, and in cinema during the silent film era. He is known for his work on the films When Shadows Fall (1916), Mothers of Men (1917), and The Three Musketeers (1921).

== Biography ==
Robards worked for the St. Louis Motion Picture Company in Santa Paula in Ventura County, California. He served as the producer for the animated series, Mutt and Jeff. During the production of the silent film Mothers of Men (1917), he created the film production company, Robards Film Company of Santa Cruz, California. He served as the manager of the Robard Players, and O.E. Goebel's Rainbow Players.

He married Grace Rosetta Maud Blake, and together they had three children, including actor Willis Robards Jr. (also known as Willis Robards III; 1912–1984). Robards died of a heart attack on November 3, 1921, in Hollywood, California, and is buried at Hollywood Forever Cemetery.

== Filmography ==
=== Director ===
- The Heart of a Cracksman (1913), director
- A Cracksman Santa Claus (1913), director
- Mothers of Men (1917), director
- Every Woman's Problem (1921)

=== Actor ===
- When Shadows Fall (1916)
- Desert Blossoms (1921) as Henry Ralston
- 'The Three Musketeers (1921 film) as Captain de Treville
- Passing Through (1921 film) as Silas Harkins
- Man to Man (1922 film) as Bill Royce

=== Writer ===
- Night Shadows (1916), a two-reel western

== See also ==
- St. Louis Motion Picture Company
