= Walt Whitman (actor) =

American actor (1859–1928)

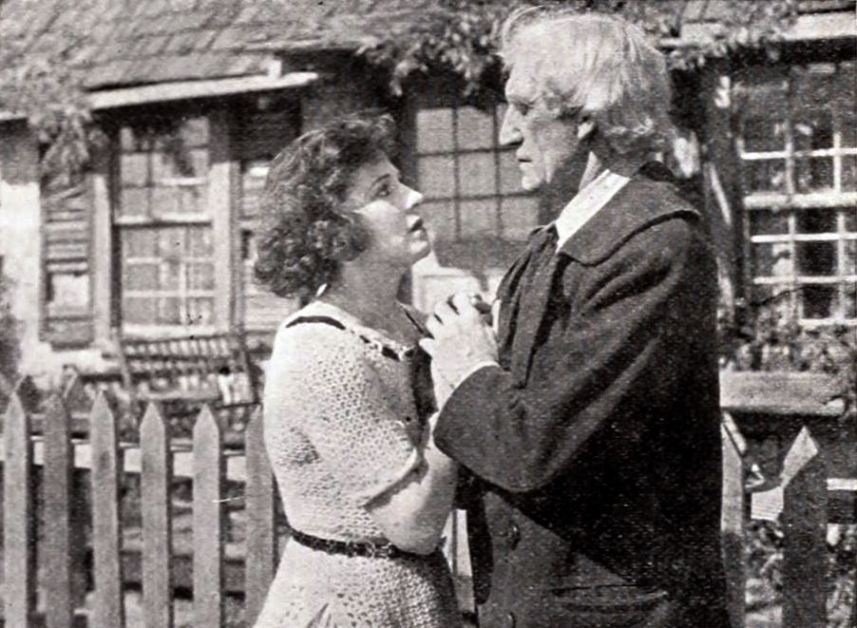
- Whitman with Ora Carew in The Girl from Rocky Point (1922)
- Born: Walter K. Whitman; April 25, 1859; Lyons, New York, U.S.
- Died: March 27, 1928 (aged 68); Santa Monica, California, U.S.
- Occupation: Actor

Walter K. Whitman (April 25, 1859 – March 27, 1928) was an American character actor of the stage and screen who was active during Hollywood's silent era. He is not to be confused with the influential poet of the same name.

== Biography ==
Whitman had a long career on the stage in cities like New York, Boston, and Chicago before he began appearing in Triangle films in the 1910s, at which point he was already an older man. He died on March 27, 1928, in Santa Monica, California.

"I was only a country lad, but I had seen so many real good shows at our local opera house that I made up my mind I would be an actor," he'd later tell reporters of his beginnings. He also recounted that in 1896, he leapt from the fifth floor of the Hotel Richelieu in Montreal when it caught on fire.

== Selected filmography ==
- Missing Daughters (1924)
- Long Live the King (1923)
- The Grub-Stake (1923)
- The Love Letter (1923)
- Wasted Lives (1923)
- Hearts Aflame (1923)
- A Question of Honor (1922)
- The Fire Bride (1922)
- The Girl from Rocky Point (1922)
- The New Disciple (1921)
- The Mysterious Rider (1921)
- His Nibs (1921)
- The Girl from God's Country (1921)
- The Three Musketeers (1921)
- The Home Stretch (1921)
- The Mark of Zorro (1920)
- Darling Mine (1920)
- Passion's Playground (1920)
- Dangerous Hours (1919)
- John Petticoats (1919)
- When Bearcat Went Dry (1919)
- Pretty Smooth (1919)
- Destiny (1919)
- The Cry of the Weak (1919)
- Whom the Gods Would Destroy (1919)
- The Heart of Humanity (1918)
- Desert Law (1918)
- Daughter Angele (1918)
- They're Off (1918)
- The Price of Applause (1918)
- False Ambition (1918)
- Everywoman's Husband (1918)
- His Enemy, the Law (1918)
- The Last Rebel (1918)
- Old Hartwell's Cub (1918)
- Captain of His Soul (1918)
- The Hopper (1918)
- Without Honor (1918)
- The Regenerates (1917)
- The Firefly of Tough Luck (1917)
- The Tar Heel Warrior (1917)
- Polly Ann (1917)
- Wee Lady Betty (1917)
- The Girl, Glory (1917)
- The Millionaire Vagrant (1917)
- The Desert Man (1917)
- Paddy O'Hara (1917)
- The Boss of the Lazy Y (1917)
- The Dark Road (1917)
- The Last of the Ingrams (1917)
- Princess of the Dark (1917)
- The Sin Ye Do (1916)
- The Criminal (1916)
- The Honorable Algy (1916)
- The Three Musketeers (1916)
- The Mating (1915)
