= Albuquerque Film Manufacturing Company =

- Trade name: Albuquerque Film Company
- Type: Private
- Industry: Motion pictures
- Genre: Silent film
- Incorporated: United States
- Founded: 1913 in Albuquerque, New Mexico, United States
- Founder: Gilbert P. Hamilton
- Defunct: 1918
- Fate: Bankrupt
- Headquarters: Los Angeles, California, United States
- Area served: United States
- Key people: Gilbert P. Hamilton (President); Dot Farley (Writer and actress); Milton H. Fahrney (Director); Homer Scott (Cinematographer)
- Brands: Luna Films
- Footnotes; Distributed through United Film Service

The Albuquerque Film Manufacturing Company, also known as the Albuquerque Film Company, was a film company established in New Mexico and soon after reincorporated in Los Angeles during the silent film era. Gilbert P. Hamilton was its president. It was established in 1913 and is known for the 3-reel westerns it produced. They were written by and star Dot Farley. Milton H. Fahrney directed. It also operated in Los Angeles in 1915 before going bankrupt in 1918. The company released its Luna branded films through United Film Service.

Hamilton joined the company from the St. Louis Motion Picture Company. Albuquerque Film Company was funded with $50,000 in stock. News reports from December 1913 state cinematographer Homer Scott was filming with Buck Connors at Fort Bliss, Texas for the newly formed Albuquerque Film Company. Perhaps the film was The First Law of Nature, a 3-reel film with Dot Farley and Connors, Albuquerque Company's first release. Hamilton and Fahrney eventually moved on to Warner Bros.

Santa Fe Trail Magazine did a feature on the new company and its major players in 1913.

Nick Cogley and Archer MacMackin directed films for the company.

In August 1914 the company reincorporated with $200,000 in stock.

== Filmography ==
- The First Law of Nature
- The Lust of the Red Man (1914)
- His Neighbor’s Pants (1914), a low budget single reel film
- Soul Mates (1914)
- Reuben's Busy Day (1914)
- With Daddy's Aid (1915)
- Pretty Policeman (1915)
- Aunt Matilda Outwitted (1915)
