= Gilbert P. Hamilton =

American film director

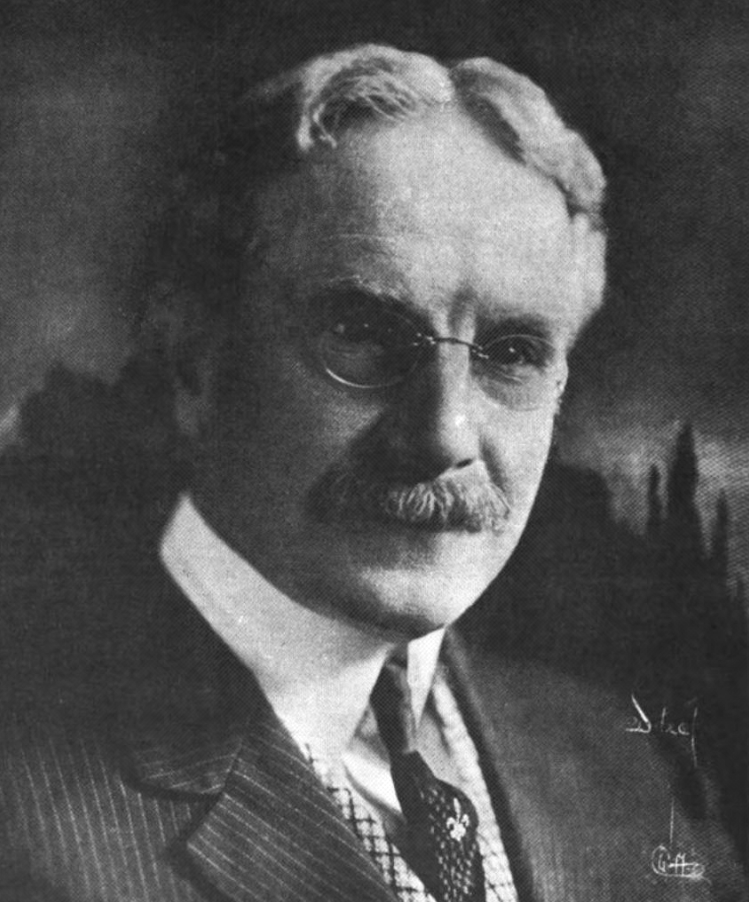
- Born: February 9, 1890; Fort Wadsworth, New York, US
- Died: May 21, 1962 (aged 72); New York, US
- Occupations: Film company executive, director
- Notable work: Captain of His Soul; The Golden Fleece; Open Your Eyes

Gilbert P. Hamilton (1890–1962) was an American film company executive and director. He worked at Essanay as a cinematographer, headed the St. Louis Motion Picture Company, and then launched the Albuquerque Film Manufacturing Company.

Jack L. Warner described him as a tall sunburned Englishman with walrus mustache and thick accent "like a Kipling character".

As a cinematographer, Hamilton collaborated with playwright and actor Lawrence Lee at Essanay in 1908. His move away from St. Louis Motion Picture Company came after it acquired Frontier Pictures and relocated to Santa Paula, California. Dot Farley followed him to his new studio Albuquerque.

== Biography ==
Gilbert P. Hamilton was born in Fort Wadsworth, New York on February 8, 1890.

He died in New York on May 21, 1962.

== Filmography ==
- Geronimo's Last Raid (1912)
- Trapped in a Forest Fire (1913) starring Charlotte Burton
- Soul Mates (1913)
- In the Mountains of Virginia (1913)
- Lieutenant Danny of the U.S.A. (1916)
- The Maternal Spark (1917), starring Josie Sedgewick (stage name for female unpersonator Julian Eltinge)
- Everywoman's Husband (1918)
- High Tide (1918)
- Captain of His Soul (1918), a Triangle Film Corporation production based on Eleanor Talbot Kinkead's magazine story "Shackles"
- False Ambition (1918), Triangle Film
- Judith (1918) starring Alma Rubens
- The Golden Fleece (1918)
- Open Your Eyes (1919)
- Coax Me (1919)
- The Woman of Lies (1919)
- The Tiger Band (1920)
- A Soul in Trust starring Belle Bennett
- Iron and Lavender starring Belle Bennett
