= Everywoman's Husband =

1918 film

- Directed by: Gilbert P. Hamilton
- Written by: Charles Logue
- Story by: John Clymer; Charles J. Wilson, Jr.
- Starring: Gloria Swanson
- Cinematography: Tom Buckingham
- Distributed by: Triangle Film Corporation
- Release date: July 17, 1918
- Running time: 5 reels (approximately 50 minutes)
- Country: United States
- Language: Silent (English intertitles)

Everywoman's Husband is a 1918 American silent drama film directed by Gilbert P. Hamilton and starring Gloria Swanson. A print of the film is preserved at the UCLA Film and Television Archive.

== Plot ==
As described in a film magazine, when the will of Jonathan Rhodes (Pearce) was read, a third of the estate was left to a woman unknown to his family. This revelation had no effect on Mrs. Rhodes (Langdon), whose iron rule in the home had been his means of seeking other company. She insisted upon regulating the affairs of her married daughter's life with the result that Frank Emerson (King), the young husband, soon became involved in an affair with Delia Marshall (West), a designer. Edith Emerson (Swanson) then began a battle to win her husband that was finally successful, but not before she asserted herself and lets her mother know that her presence in the household was no longer welcome.

== Cast ==
- Gloria Swanson as Edith Emerson
- Joe King as Frank Emerson
- Lillian Langdon as Mrs. Rhodes
- George C. Pearce as Jonathan Rhodes (credited as George Pearce)
- Lillian West as Delia Marshall
- Jack Livingston as Reginald Dunstan
- Walt Whitman
- Ed Brady

== Reception ==
Like many American films of the time, Everywoman's Husband was subject to restrictions and cuts by city and state film censorship boards. For example, the Chicago Board of Censors cut, in Reel 3, the two intertitles "For years my residence has been merely my address and not my home" and "I had his love", closeup of nude statue, love scenes in Marshall's apartment, and, in Reel 4, the two intertitles "I think you are mistaken. I am his wife and you are merely his ——" and "I have made him comfortable and happy".
