= The Little Brother =

- Directed by: Charles Miller
- Written by: Lambert Hillyer; Lois Zellner (Story)
- Starring: William Garwood; Enid Bennett
- Cinematography: Clyde De Vinna
- Distributed by: Triangle Distributing Corporation
- Release date: March 11, 1917
- Running time: 50 min.
- Country: United States
- Languages: Silent film English intertitles

The Little Brother is a 1917 American silent drama directed by Charles Miller and starring William Garwood and Australian actress Enid Bennett. The scenario was written by Lambert Hillyer based on a story by Lois Zellner.

== Cast ==
- Enid Bennett as Jerry Ross
- William Garwood as Franak Girard
- Josephine Headley as Janet Girard
- Dorcas Matthews as Dulcie Hayes
- William Fairbanks as Dillon (as Carl Ullman)
