= O Mimi San =

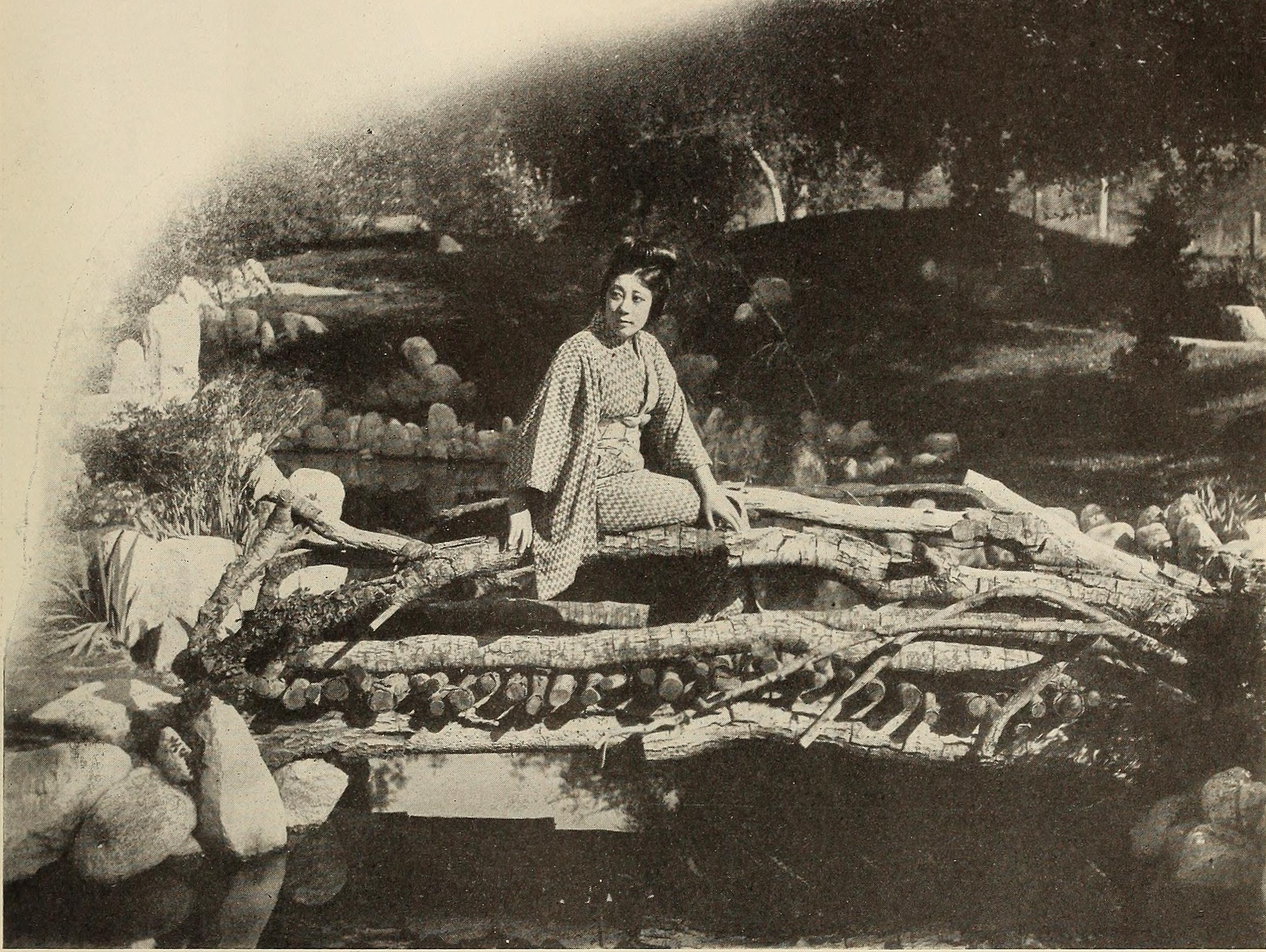
- Tsuru Aoki in an image from Reel Life
- Directed by: Charles Miller (unconfirmed)
- Written by: Thomas H. Ince
- Starring: Sessue Hayakawa; Tsuru Aoki
- Production company: Domino Film Company
- Distributed by: Mutual Film
- Release date: February 5, 1914 (USA)
- Running time: 20 minutes
- Country: United States
- Language: Silent (English intertitles)

O Mimi San is a 1914 American silent drama short film directed by Charles Miller, featuring Tsuru Aoki in the title role and Sessue Hayakawa. The film was produced by the Domino Film Company and distributed by Mutual Film.

== Plot ==
As described in Reel Life magazine, "In the days of the Revolution in Japan — in the early '60's — the feeble, old Emperor, for reasons of state betrothes his elder son, Yoritomo, to Sada San, daughter of the Prime Minister. The chief Shogun — supposedly loyal to the Emperor — aspires to the throne, and realizing that the Japanese people would never permit him to occupy the throne in person, he casts about for someone whom he can place there and use as his puppet. The younger son of the Emperor, Tokugawa, seems to be the best dummy the Shogun can find — and he prevails upon him to enter the conspiracy. Yoritomo is sent away in disguise — and in a far part of the empire, he meets and falls in love with a beautiful Japanese girl, of humble birth, the daughter of a gardener. O Mimi San has no notion that her lover is the elder son of the Mikado. Meanwhile, the plot at the court is discovered, and reported to the Emperor. On his death, he summons the rightful heir, Yoritomo — who is obliged to leave his sweetheart and return to the capital to marry Sada San and ascend the throne."

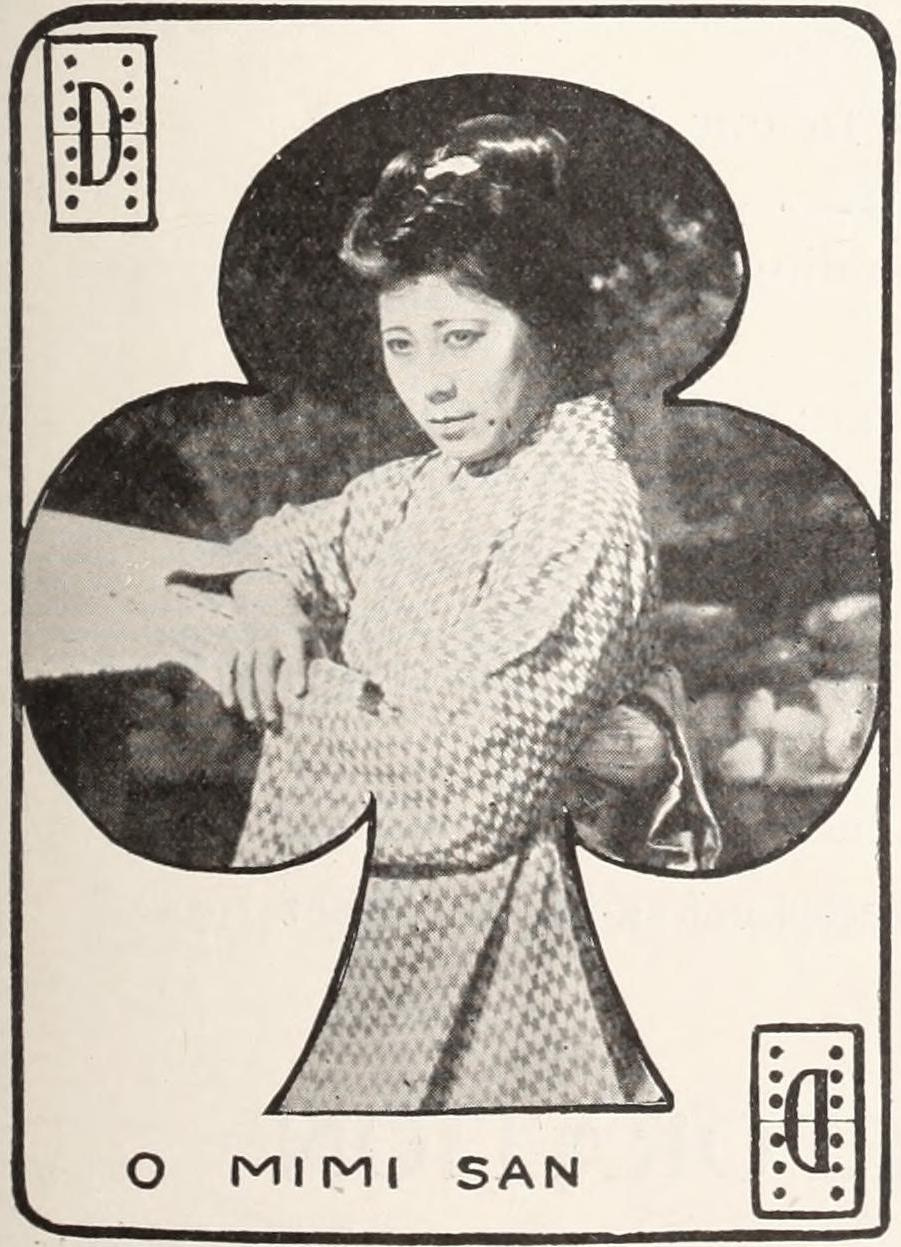
Tsuru Aoki

== Cast ==
- Tsuru Aoki as O Mimi San
- Sessue Hayakawa as Yoritomo
- Kisaburo Kurihara as Tokugawa
- Chick Morrison as Shogun
- George Osborne as Mikado
- Charles Elder as Owari
- Miss Lyons as Sada San

== Preservation ==
A 35 mm film print of O Mimi San is held by the George Eastman Museum in Rochester, New York.
