= Lee Hill (actor) =

American actor

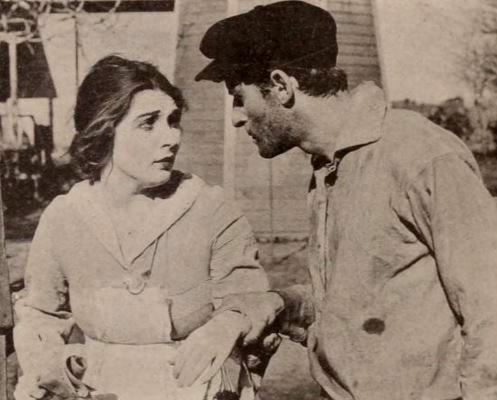
- Belle Bennett and Lee Hill in The Lonely Woman (1918)
- Born: Tellman Trexler; July 8, 1894; Minnesota, US
- Died: September 15, 1957 (aged 63); Los Angeles, California, US
- Occupation: Actor
- Years active: 1914–1924

Lee Hill Trexler (born Tellman Trexler; July 8, 1894 – September 15, 1957) was an American actor of the silent era. He appeared in 74 films between 1914 and 1924. He was born in Minnesota and died in Los Angeles, California.

== Selected filmography ==
- Shanghaied (1915)
- Guilty (1916)
- Behind the Lines (1916)
- The Fuel of Life (1917)
- Station Content (1918)
- False Ambition (1918)
- A Sporting Chance (1919)
- Girls (1919)
- A Master Stroke (1920)
- Cytherea (1924)
