= The Secret of the Storm Country =

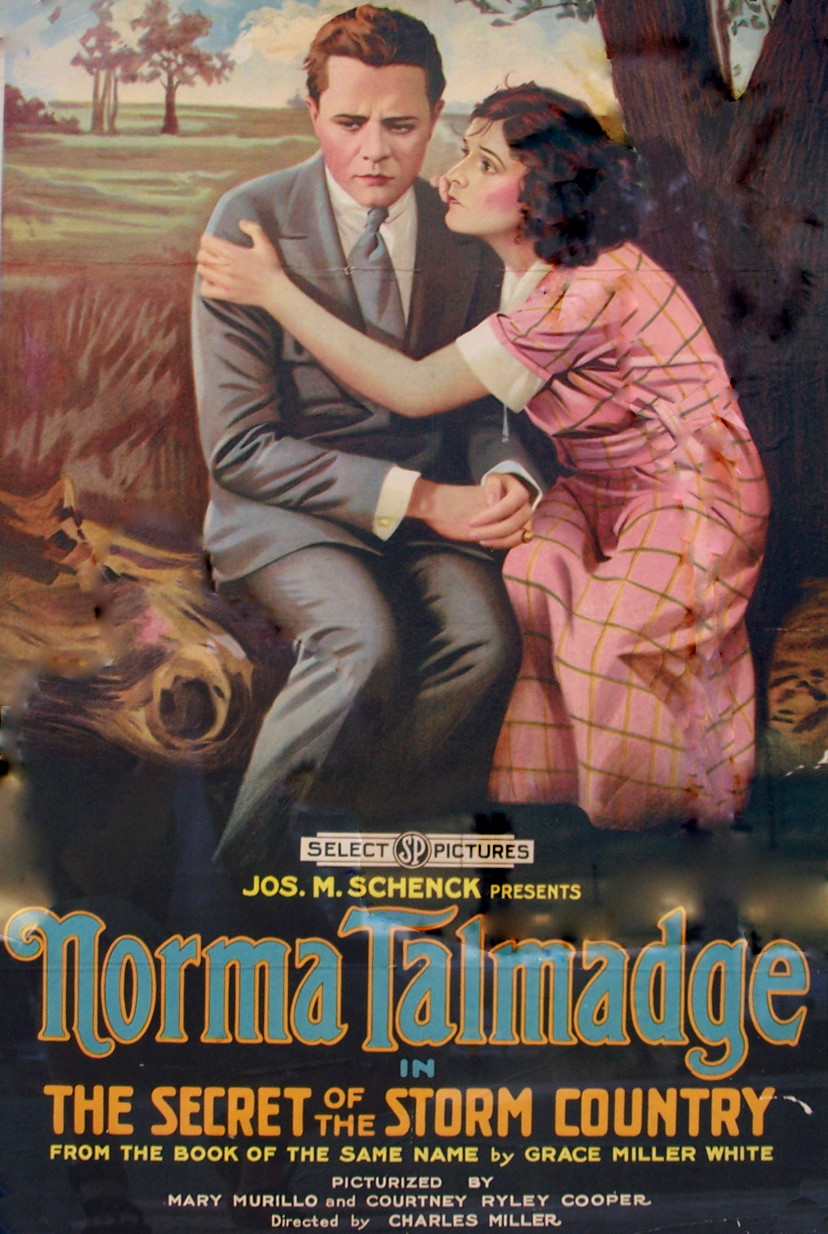
- Theatrical poster
- Directed by: Charles Miller
- Written by: Mary Murillo
- Story by: Grace Miller White
- Produced by: Joseph M. Schenck
- Starring: Norma Talmadge
- Production company: Norma Talmadge Film Corporation
- Distributed by: Select Pictures
- Release date: November 1917
- Running time: 72 minutes
- Country: United States
- Language: Silent (English intertitles)

The Secret of the Storm Country is a 1917 American silent drama film directed by Charles Miller and starring Norma Talmadge (whose company also produced the film). The film is described as not a direct sequel but a "continuation" of the 1914 film Tess of the Storm Country, starring Mary Pickford. The film is now considered lost. Two and a half minutes of continuous footage was rediscovered in 2025.

== Plot ==
Tess Skinner is the daughter of an indigent squatter. She falls in love with wealthy Frederick Graves. They soon marry, but they have to keep it secret as Frederick's parents would never approve. His parents later force him to marry heiress Madelene Waldersticker. Too afraid to tell them he already has a spouse, he acquiesces to his mother's wishes. Tess conceals his crime of bigamy and meanwhile is pregnant. She is thrown out of church when she refuses to tell who the betrayer is. The middle-aged admirer Mr. Young offers her protection against the townspeople. She has no intention on marrying him, until Frederick dies several years later.

== Cast ==
- Norma Talmadge as Tess Skinner
- Edwin Denison as Orn Skinner
- J. Herbert Frank as Ebenezer Walderstricker
- Niles Welch as Frederick Graves
- Ethel Grey Terry as Madelene Walderstricker
- Mrs. H.J. Brundage as Mrs. Graves
- Charles Gotthold as Mr. Young

== Reception ==
At the time of its release, the movie became a great success. The New York Times reported Talmadge delivered one of her finest and most realistic characterizations as the benighted Tess. Variety wrote Talmadge gives the part a touch of realness that carries its own appeal, and never seems to "spread" herself for solo effects, but rather works toward the collective benefits.

Like many American films of the time, The Secret of the Storm Country was subject to cuts by city and state film censorship boards. For example, the Chicago Board of Censors issued an Adults Only permit and cut the intertitle "Tessibel's secret is revealed to the eyes of the jealous woman". The Board, for general viewing, made additional cuts, in Reel 1, of the entire incident of the man attacking the young woman, in Reel 3, the intertitle "The awakening", in Reel 4, the three intertitles "Tessibel's secret is revealed to the eyes of the jealous woman", "Help Tessibel to die in the spring", and "Confronted by the hypocritical pillars of the church", the letter to Tess asking her to appear before the church board, and, in Reel 5, the entire incident of Tess's appearance before the church board and all intertitles referring to this.
