= Enemies of Children =

1923 film by Lillian Ducey

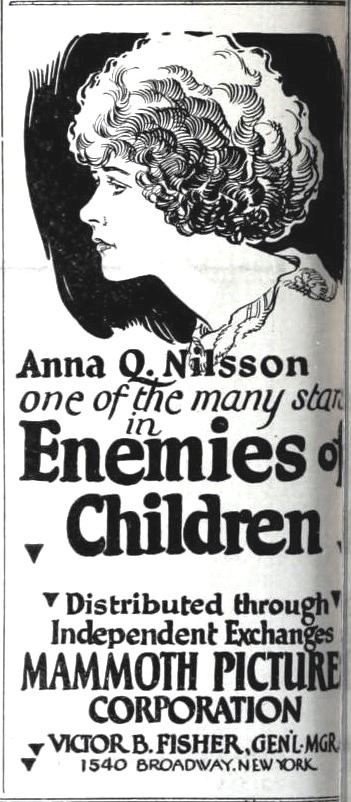
- Advertisement
- Directed by: Lillian Ducey; John M. Voshell
- Written by: Lillian Ducey; John M. Voshell
- Based on: Youth Triumphant by George Gibbs
- Produced by: Fisher Productions
- Starring: Anna Q. Nilsson
- Distributed by: Mammoth Pictures
- Release date: December 13, 1923
- Running time: 60 minutes
- Country: United States
- Language: Silent (English intertitles)

Enemies of Children is a 1923 American silent drama film directed by Lillian Ducey and John M. Voshell that was based upon the novel Youth Triumphant by George Gibbs. It is the only screen director credit for Ducey and one of two for Voshell. Both were in the film industry in other fields. This was an independent production released by independent distributor Mammoth Pictures.

== Cast ==
- Anna Q. Nilsson as Patsy, as an Adult
- George Siegmann as Mr. Slavin
- Lucy Beaumont
- Joseph J. Dowling (credited as Joseph Dowling)
- Raymond Hatton as Van Leer
- Ward Crane
- Charles Wellesley
- Virginia Lee Corbin as Little Patsy, a Waif, as a Child
- Kate Price as Mrs. McGuire
- Boyd Irwin
- Eugenie Besserer as Mrs. Slavin
- William Boyd as Philip Conway, a Profligate
- Mary Anderson

== Preservation ==
With no prints of Enemies of Children located in any film archives, it is a lost film.
