= The Ghosts of Yesterday =

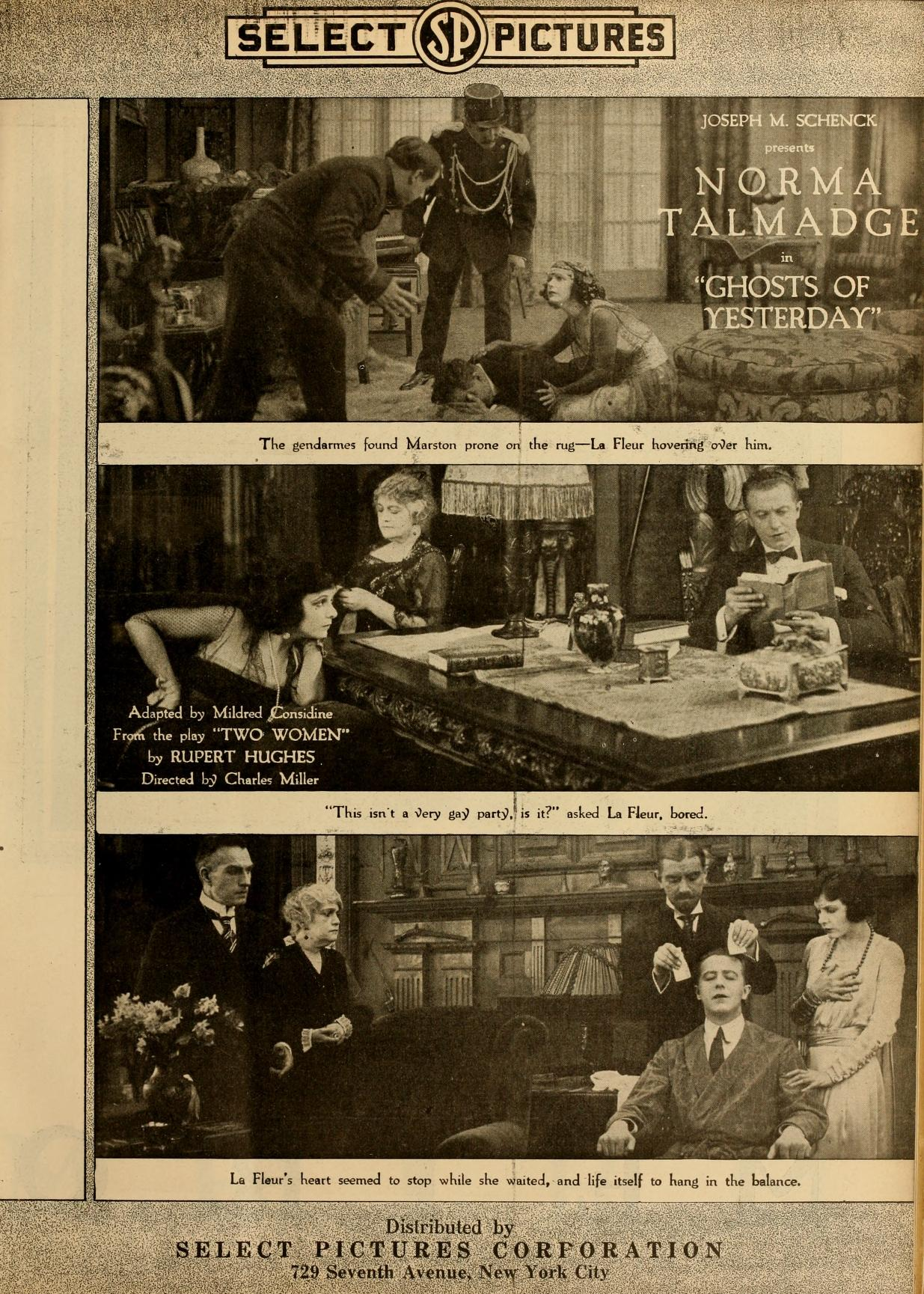
- Advertisement
- Directed by: Charles Miller
- Written by: Michael Considine
- Based on: Two Woman by Rupert Hughes
- Produced by: Joseph M. Schenck
- Starring: Norma Talmadge
- Cinematography: Edward Wynyard
- Production company: Norma Talmadge Film Corporation
- Distributed by: Select Pictures
- Release date: January 19, 1918
- Running time: 6 reels
- Country: United States
- Language: Silent (English intertitles)

The Ghosts of Yesterday is a 1918 American silent adventure drama film directed by Charles Miller and starring Norma Talmadge, Eugene O'Brien, and Stuart Holmes. It is based on the play Two Women by Rupert Hughes.

== Cast ==
- Norma Talmadge as Ruth Graham / Jeanne La Fleur
- Eugene O'Brien as Howard Marston
- Stuart Holmes as Count Pascal de Fondras
- John Daly Murphy as Duc de Lissac
- Henry Hebert as Roger Stearns (credited as Henry J. Hebert)
- Ida Darling as Mrs. Whitaker
- Blanche Douglas as Marie Calleaux

== Preservation status ==
The film survives incomplete in the Library of Congress, which holds reels 1-4 of 6 and a fragment of the last reel.
