= Princess of the Dark =

1917 film

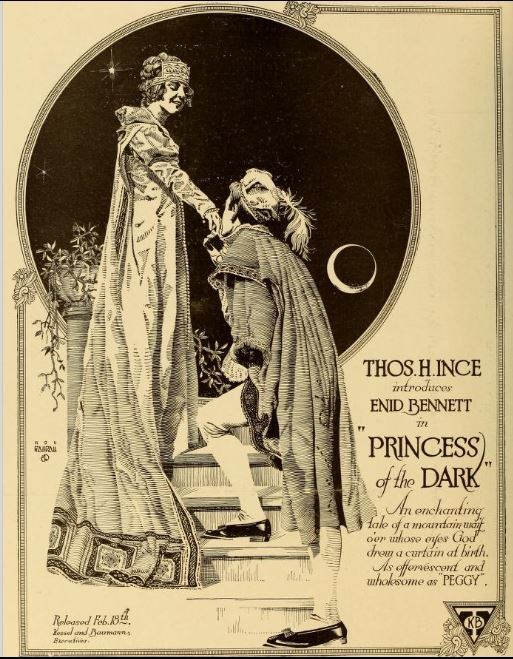
- Directed by: Charles Miller
- Written by: Monte M. Katterjohn
- Story by: Lanier Bartlett
- Produced by: Thomas H. Ince
- Starring: Enid Bennett; John Gilbert; Gayne Whitman
- Cinematography: Clyde De Vinna
- Music by: Victor Schertzinger
- Production company: Triangle Film Corporation
- Distributed by: Triangle Distributing
- Release date: October 28, 1917
- Running time: 50 minutes
- Country: United States
- Language: Silent (English intertitles)

Princess of the Dark is a 1917 American silent drama film directed by Charles Miller and starring Enid Bennett, John Gilbert, and Gayne Whitman.

== Cast ==
- Enid Bennett as Fay Herron
- John Gilbert as 'Crip' Halloran
- Gayne Whitman as Jack Rockwell
- Walt Whitman as James Herron
- J. Frank Burke as Crip's Father

== Preservation ==
With no prints of Princess of the Dark located in any film archives, it is considered a lost film.

== Bibliography ==
- John T. Soister, Henry Nicolella, Steve Joyce. American Silent Horror, Science Fiction and Fantasy Feature Films, 1913-1929. McFarland, 2014.
