= Eleanor Talbot Kinkead =

American novelist

Eleanor Talbot Kinkead, also known as Mrs. Thompson Short, was a writer in the United States. Several of her works were made into films including Captain of His Soul adapted by Lillian Ducey from her magazine story "Shackles", The Lost Sermon based on one of her stories, and Rosemary, That's for Remembrance.

She was born in Kentucky. William B. Kinkead, a judge, was her father. Her sister was a poet. She was the great-granddaughter of Isaac Shelby, Kentucky's first and fifth governor, and his estate featured in her work.

She wrote the novel Florida Alexander, a Kentucky Girl.

== Bibliography ==
- Florida Alexander, a Kentucky Girl (1898)
- The Invisible Bond (1906)
- The Courage of Blackburn Blair (1907)
- The Spoils of the Strong (1920)
- Young Greer of Kentucky
