= The Lost Sermon =

- Written by: Eleanor Talbot Kinkead (Story)
- Starring: Harry De Vere; Reaves Eason
- Production company: American Film Manufacturing Company
- Distributed by: Mutual Film Corporation
- Release date: May 25, 1914
- Country: United States
- Languages: Silent film English intertitles

The Lost Sermon is a 1914 American silent short drama film starring William Garwood, Harry von Meter, Jack Richardson Vivian Rich and Louise Lester. It was based on a story written by Eleanor Talbot Kinkead.

== Cast ==
- Harry De Vere
- Reaves Eason
- William Garwood
- Louise Lester
- Jack Richardson
- Vivian Rich
- Harry von Meter
