= Geronimo's Last Raid =

1912 film

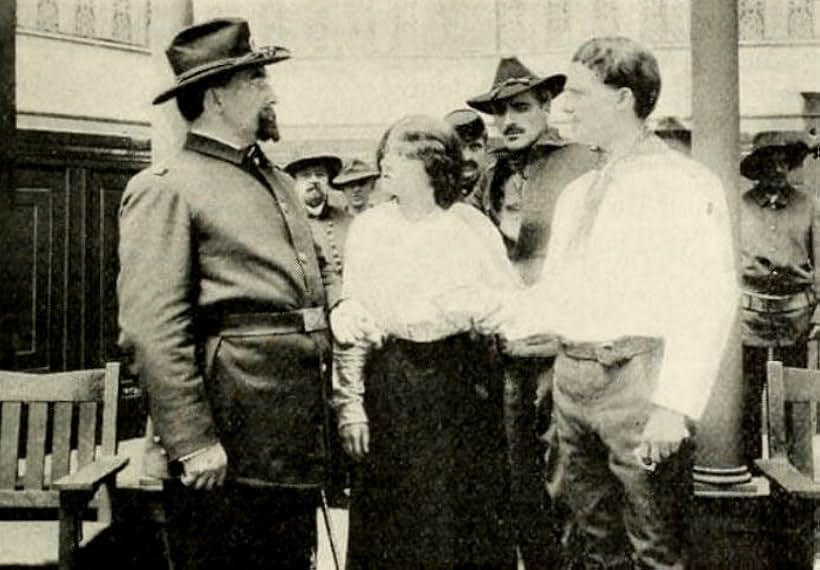
- Film still
- Directed by: Gilbert P. Hamilton
- Written by: John Emerson
- Starring: J. Warren Kerrigan; Pauline Bush; Jack Richardson; Jessalyn Van Trump
- Distributed by: American Film Manufacturing Company
- Release date: September 12, 1912
- Country: United States
- Languages: Silent; English intertitles

Geronimo's Last Raid is a 1912 American silent Western film directed by Gilbert P. Hamilton. This information about the film appeared in The Moving Picture World for August 10, 1912.

"Geronimo's Last Raid," the two-reel subject completed by Producer Emerson just before he left Chicago, was shown to some Ottawa and La Salle officials at a private exhibition in the Majestic Theater at Ottawa last Saturday. Incidentally, the entire company was present and spent the remainder of the night in celebration. At 2 A. M. the wearied party hauled themselves up the 275-foot bluff on top of which the camp is situated. A heavy rope is used in assisting the traveler up the side of the Rock.

Dick Garrick was one of the many visitors at Camp Hutchinson last week. Dick expressed himself as never before having seen so perfectly organized and contented a lot of motion picture workers as those under command of Producer Emerson. Dick shared the opinion of many other visitors that perhaps the fact that Mr. Emerson is an Annapolis graduate had a good deal to do with it.

Mr. and Mrs. Jack Nelson recently presented Mrs. Emerson, who is playing ingenue leads, with a handsome pair of goldplated spurs. Mrs. Emerson's one lament since then was the absence of a horse to try them on. Property man Lew Beck heard the wail and Mrs. Emerson was one morning notified that two horses awaited her disposal outside her tent. Mrs. Emerson joyfully hurried from the tent only to find — alack — two sawhorses !

B. C. Fischer, playing a treacherous Indian lover, had a difficult fall to make from a high ledge into the river. Screwing his courage to the sticking point, Fischer made a pretty fall. His splash was followed by a loud bellow of rage from cameraman Jack Gill, who announced that his camera had "bucked." His bellow was a mere whisper in comparison with what issued from behind the rock when the struggling figure in the water heard the news.

S. Richards, publisher of the Ottawa Journal and State Superintendent of the Starved Rock Reservation, telephoned to the camp that he would arrive early in the afternoon for an inspection of the camp with Joy Morton, multi-millionaire salt magnate, and Governor Charles S. Deneen, of Illinois. However, the governor failed to show up. Cameraman Jack Gill trained the camera on Richards, thinking him the governor, and ground out some 125 feet of film in a state of high excitement until some knowing one exclaimed, "Wake up, Jack, for the love of Mike; that ain't the Givernor!"

== Plot ==
This plot summary was registered with the Library of Congress for the film's original copyright filing:

LIEUTENANT PARKER reports for duty to Major Wilkins, commanding Ft. Sill, where Geronimo is a prisoner. Parker quickly wins the love of Pauline, the major's daughter, and the undying hatred of Capt. Gray. The captain plans to release Geronimo in the dead of night, throwing the blame on Parker. This he successfully does by obtaining, through an accident in the billiard room, possession of a letter from an Eastern friend to Lieutenant Parker. By tearing out a portion of this letter reading, "of course Geronimo's escape would mean an advantage to you," he successfully deceives everyone. But meantime Parker has been hurriedly detailed to find Geronimo; so Gray is sent out with a second detachment to overtake both Geronimo and Parker and make them both prisoners.

Through a friendly orderly, Pauline learns of the trick. She hastens after Parker to warn him but falls into Geronimo's clutches. The lieutenant is himself captured by Geronimo and, with Pauline, makes his escape.

Later, he rescues Captain Gray and his command from certain death, and is rewarded by being made prisoner by Captain Gray. But all is explained at the formal court-martial, when Pauline rushes in with the other portion of the letter. That paragraph completed reads – "of course Geronimo's escape would mean an advantage to you YOUNG FELLOWS FRESH FROM WEST POINT, BY GIVING YOU A CHANCE TO RECAPTURE GERONIMO AND SHOW YOUR METTLE. GOOD LUCK, OLD BOY. FROM YOUR OLD FRIEND, JIM RANDOM."

In Geronimo's Last Raid you have the decidedly unusual in Indian pictures. Aside from some remarkably splendid battles, involving more than 200 people, you are also shown many interesting customs of the savages never before made a part of Indian pictures. For instance, the Indians had a language of their own — a sort of wireless — a way of conveying messages by smoke signals. This is one of the many distinguishing touches given this subject that will make it delightful. By firing through the bunghole of a barrel, Pauline saves her lover from being burned at the stake — another decidedly new and novel touch that will please.

Set around the capture and escape of Geronimo, a prominent Native American leader of the Chiricahua Apache, the film is a period drama involving a love affair between Lieutenant Parker and Pauline, Major Wilkins' daughter, and the jealous Captain Gray. Gray secretly releases Geronimo held prisoner at Fort Sill and Parker is dispatched to find Geromino. After succeeding in throwing the blame on Parker, Gray receives orders from Major Wilkins to take both Parker and Geronimo prisoners. Pauline learns of the ruse, however, and while attempting to warn Parker, is captured by Geronimo who also takes Parker prisoner. Parker and Pauline manage to escape. Subduing Captain Gray and his men, Geronimo prepares to execute them. Rescued by Lieutenant Parker, Gray nonetheless has him jailed to face a court-martial but Pauline finally clears Parker of the charges against him.

== Cast ==
- J. Warren Kerrigan
- Pauline Bush
- Jack Richardson
- Jessalyn Van Trump
- Jack Nelson as James
- Mabel Emerson as Pauline
