= Polly Ann =

1917 silent film by Charles Miller

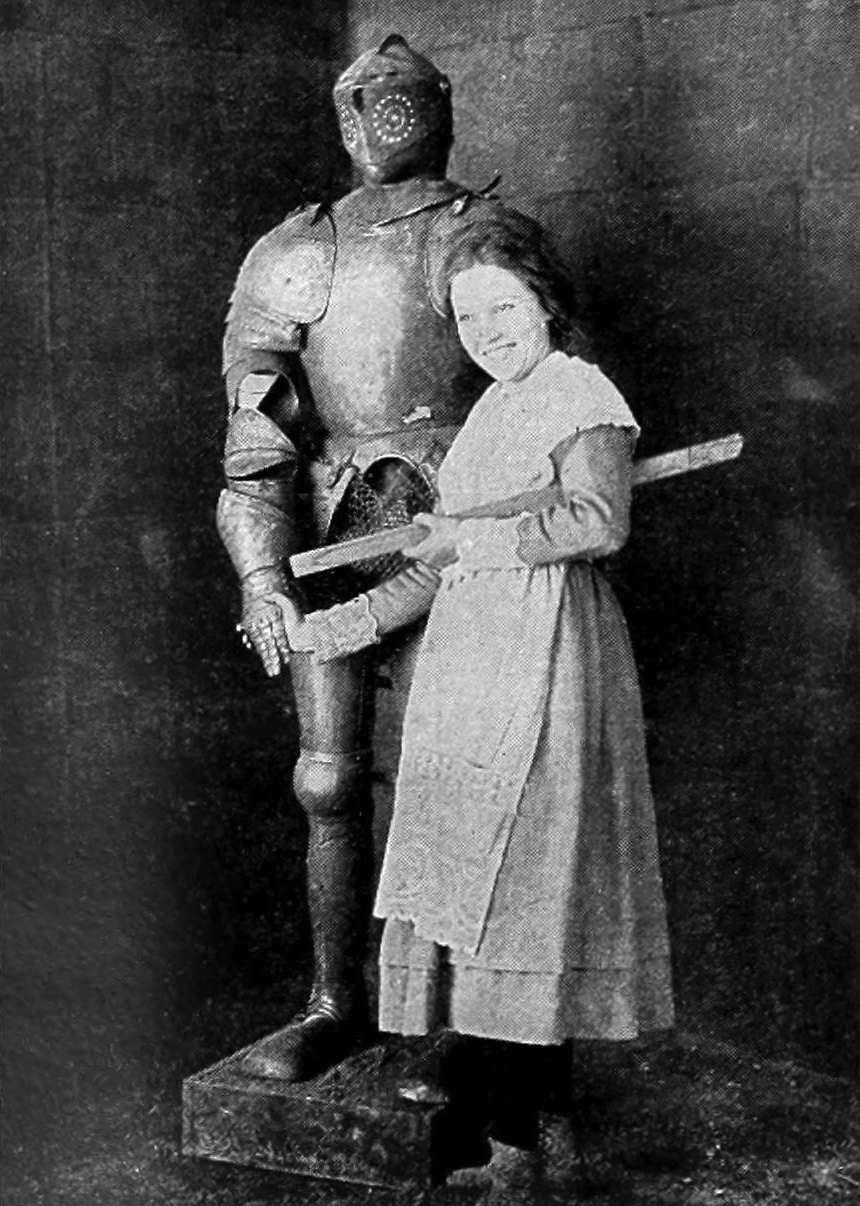
- Bessie Love in the film
- Directed by: Charles Miller
- Written by: J. G. Hawks; R. Cecil Smith
- Produced by: Triangle Film Corporation
- Starring: Bessie Love
- Cinematography: Henry Bredesen
- Distributed by: Triangle Film Corporation
- Release date: September 9, 1917 (U.S.)
- Running time: 5 reels
- Country: United States
- Language: Silent (English intertitles)

Polly Ann (also known as The Little Reformer and Pernickety Polly Ann) is a lost 1917 American silent comedy-drama film produced and distributed by the Triangle Film Corporation. It was directed by Charles Miller and stars Bessie Love.

== Plot ==
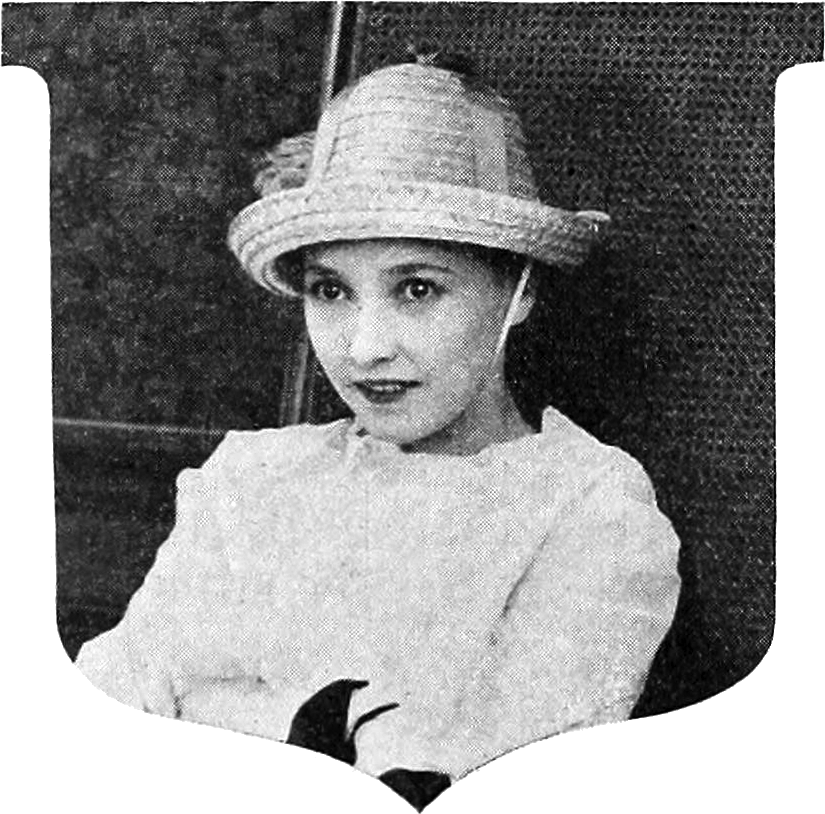
Bessie Love as Polly Ann

In rural New Hampshire, Orphan Polly Ann (Love) leaves the poor farm to work at the village tavern, run by Jud Simpkins (Lockney). When a traveling theater troupe comes to town, actor Hubert de Courcey (Foss) convinces Polly Ann to become an actress and leave with them. Village schoolteacher Howard Straightlane (Lee) intervenes, and takes Polly Ann under his wing. When a sick relative in Boston sends for Polly Ann, she goes to care for the relative, and nurses him back to health. When she learns that this relative and Howard are uncle and nephew, Polly Ann facilitates a reunion between them. The uncle then gives his blessing for Polly Ann and Howard to marry.

== Cast ==
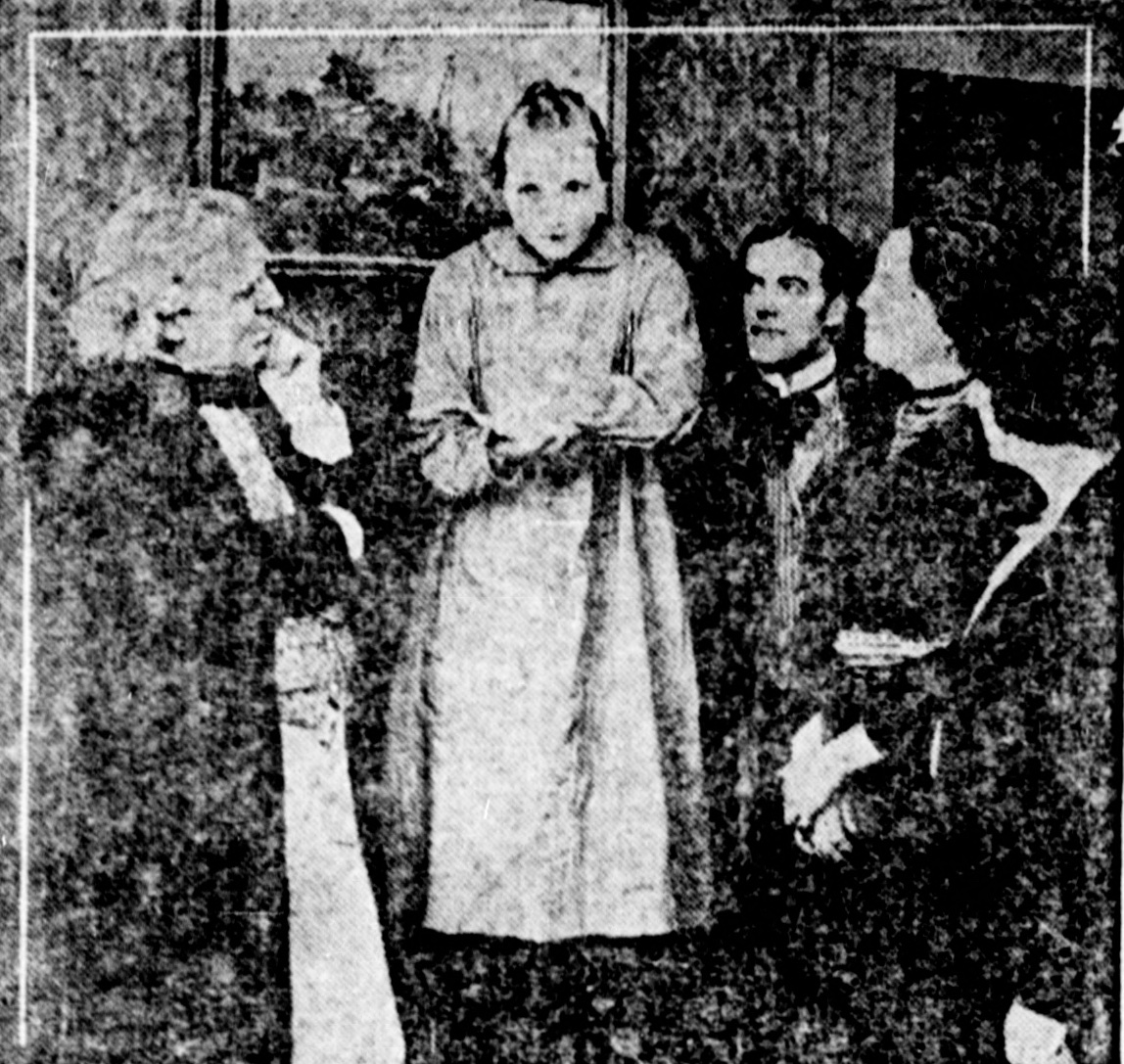
The cast in a scene from the film

- Bessie Love as Polly Ann
- J. P. Lockney as Simpkins
- Rowland V. Lee as Howard Straightlane
- William Ellingford as Squire Bacon
- Darrell Foss as Hubert de Courcey
- Alfred Hollingsworth as Junius Trewalker
- Josephine Headley as Mrs. Porter
- Walt Whitman as Jacob Straightline

== Reception ==
Although the plot was considered unoriginal by its reviewers, the film did well at the box office.
