= Rosemary, That's for Remembrance =

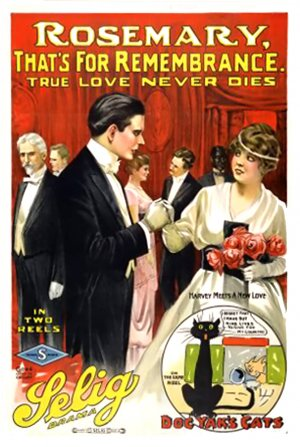
- Theatrical poster to Rosemary, That's for Remembrance
- Directed by: Francis J. Grandon
- Written by: Eleanor Talbot Kinkead
- Release date: November 2, 1914
- Country: United States

Rosemary, That's for Remembrance is a 1914 American silent short drama directed by Francis J. Grandon. The film starred Earle Foxe and Adda Gleason.
