= Mothers of Men =

1917 silent film and its 1921 re-edited version

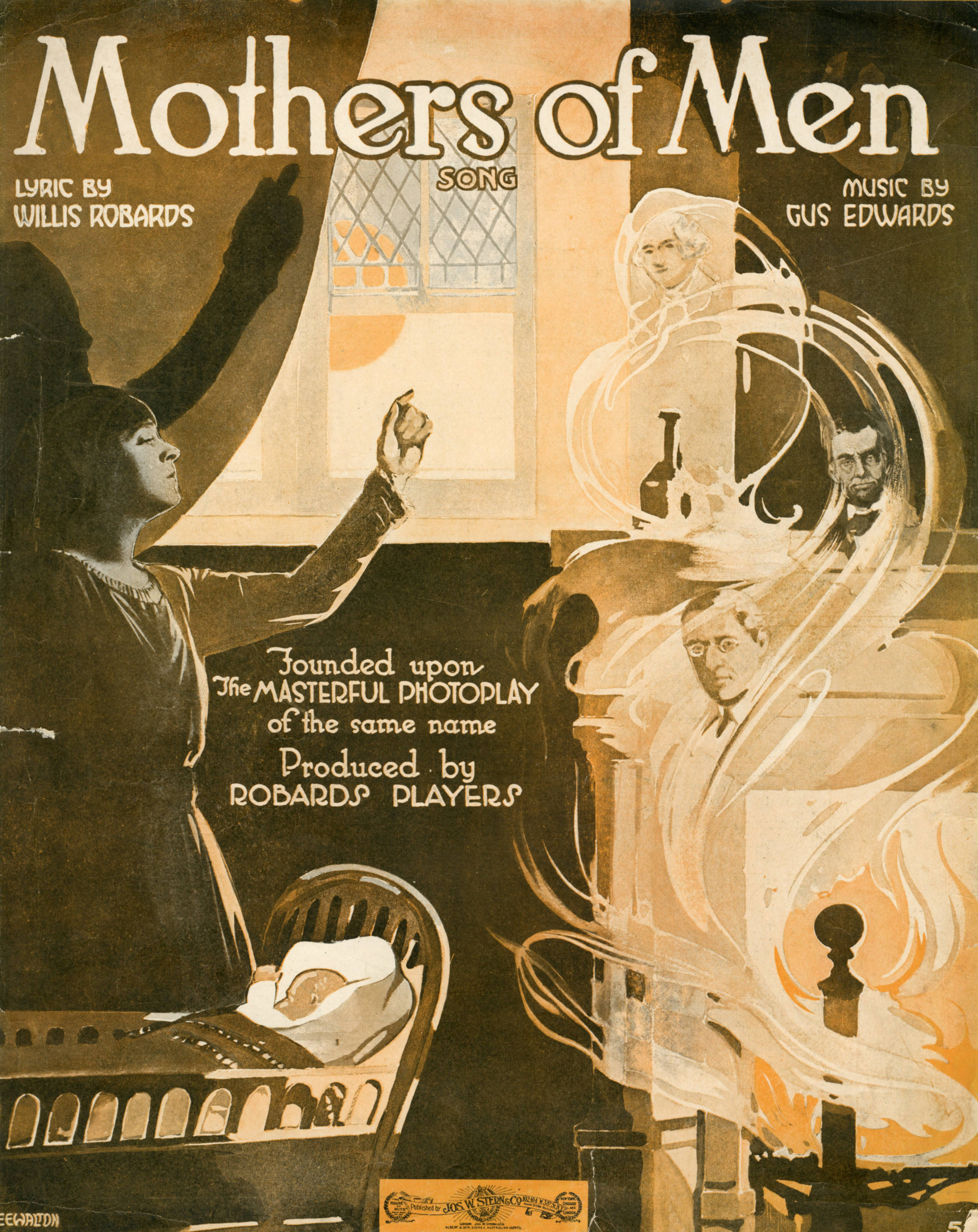
Sheet music

Mothers of Men is a 1917 silent film directed by Willis Robards, promoting woman's suffrage. The seven-reel drama is considered lost. A five-reel re-edited version also directed by Robards was released in 1921—following ratification of the Nineteenth Amendment—under the title Every Woman's Problem. This version survives through a single 35mm print preserved by the British Film Institute. The 1921 re-release was restored in 2016, in a collaboration between the BFI and the San Francisco Silent Film Festival.

The courtroom drama stars Dorothy Davenport as a judge who wins election as Governor of California. A moral issue arises when her husband is sentenced to death, and she must choose whether to pardon him.

== Mothers of Men ==
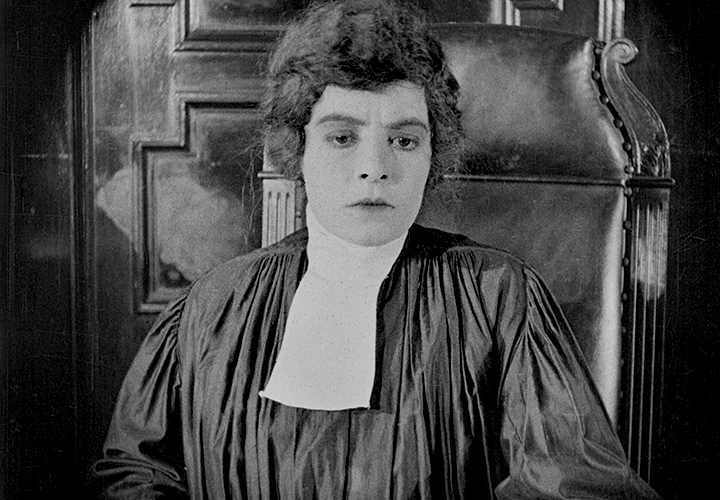
Dorothy Davenport as Clara Madison

Mothers of Men was produced by the Robards Film Company of Santa Cruz, and released in November 1917. The story and scenario were written by actor-playwright Hal Reid, father-in-law of the film's star, Dorothy Davenport.

=== Cast ===
- Willis Robards as Worthington Williams
- Dorothy Davenport as Clara Madison
- Hal Reid as Jack Scranton
- Mrs. Hal Reid as Mrs. Madison
- Katherine Griffith as Maida
- Arthur Tavares as Giuseppe
- Billie Bennett
- Marcella Russell
- Harry Griffith
- Grace Blake
- George Utell
- Cesare Gravina

== Every Woman’s Problem ==
Every Woman's Problem (1921)

In the hands of editor Martin G. Cohn, the 1917 film Mothers of Men was trimmed from seven reels to five for the 1921 release Every Woman’s Problem, produced by Plymouth Pictures Corporation. The screenplay by Jack Natteford is based on the original scenario by Hal Reid. Titles were revised, and additional filming was done in Santa Cruz, California. Plymouth Pictures secured permission for Dorothy Davenport to be billed as Mrs. Wallace Reid. The film premiered in Paterson, New Jersey, the week of April 10, 1921.

=== Cast ===
- Mrs. Wallace Reid as Clara Madison
- Willis Robards as Grant Williams
- Maclyn King as Big Bill Deavitt
- Wilson Du Bois as Dan Channing

== See also ==
- Women's suffrage in film
