= False Ambition =

1918 film

- Directed by: Gilbert P. Hamilton
- Screenplay by: E. Magnus Ingleton
- Story by: E. Magnus Ingleton
- Starring: Alma Rubens
- Cinematography: Jack MacKenzie
- Distributed by: Triangle Distributing
- Release date: July 21, 1918
- Country: United States
- Languages: Silent; English intertitles

False Ambition is a 1918 silent drama film produced and released by the Triangle Film Corporation. Directed by Gilbert P. Hamilton, the film stars Alma Rubens.

== Cast ==
- Alma Rubens - Judith/Zariska
- Peggy Pearce - Felicity
- Alberta Lee - Anna
- Edward Peil - David Strong
- Walt Whitman - Mark Strong
- Iris Ashton - Mrs. Dorian
- Myrtle Rishell - Mrs. Pemberton
- Lillian Langdon - Mrs. Van Dixon
- Lee Phelps - Peter Van Dixon
- Ward Caulfield - John Van Dixon
- Lee Hill - Paul Vincent
- Alice Crawford - Lucy Vernon

== Preservation ==
- False Ambition is now a lost film.
