= Wee Lady Betty =

1917 silent film by Charles Miller

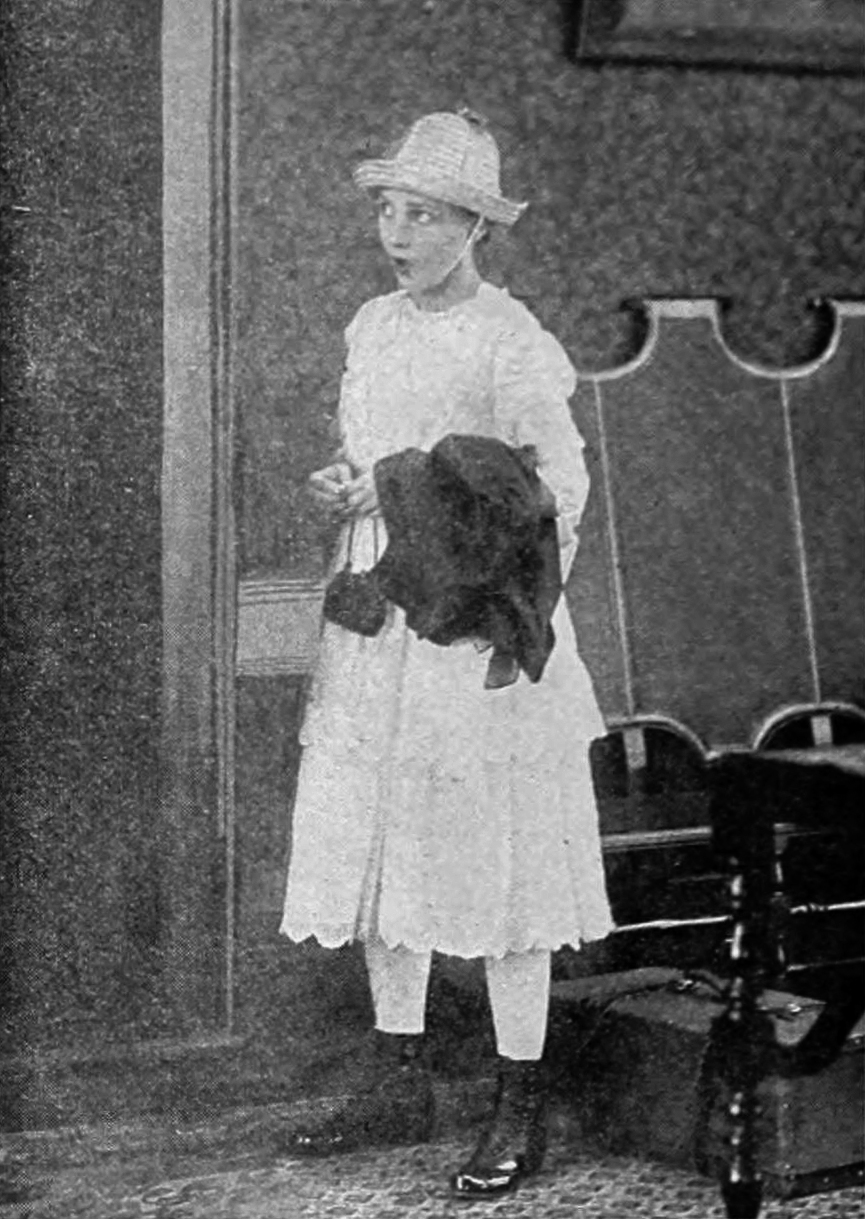
- Wee Lady Betty (Love) identifies a ghost in her castle
- Directed by: Charles Miller; Frank Borzage (uncredited)
- Written by: J. G. Hawks
- Starring: Bessie Love; Frank Borzage; Charles K. French
- Cinematography: Henry Bredesen
- Production company: Triangle Film Corporation
- Distributed by: Triangle Film Corporation
- Release date: August 19, 1917 (U.S.)
- Running time: 5 reels
- Country: United States
- Language: Silent (English intertitles)

Wee Lady Betty is a 1917 American silent drama film produced and distributed by the Triangle Film Corporation. It was directed by Charles Miller and stars Bessie Love, Frank Borzage, and Charles K. French. It is considered lost.

== Plot ==
O'Reilly Castle, set on a small Irish isle, has been occupied by the family of Wee Lady Betty (Love) for generations. However, when the actual owner of the castle dies, the ownership is transferred to his heir, Roger O'Reilly (Borzage). In an attempt to scare away the new owner, Betty briefly tricks him into thinking that the castle is haunted, but he falls in love with her.

== Cast ==
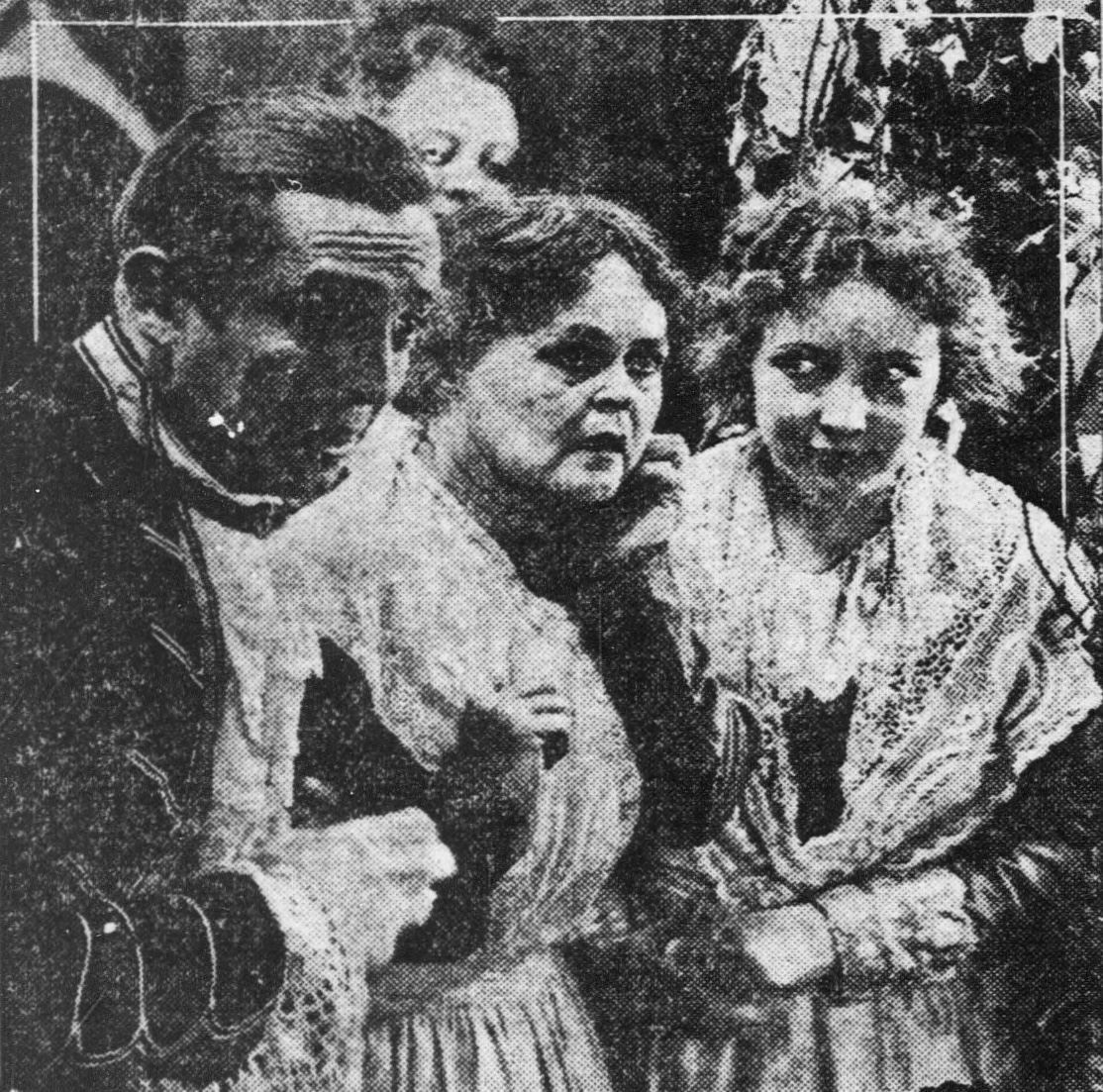
Scene from the film

- Bessie Love as Wee Lady Betty
- Frank Borzage as Roger O'Reilly
- Charles K. French as Fergus McClusky
- Walter Perkins as Shamus McTeague
- L. Jefferies as Lanty O'Dea
- Walt Whitman as The O'Reilly
- Aggie Herring as Mrs. O'Reilly
- Thornton Edwards as Connor O'Donovan

== Production ==
Village scenes were filmed on the lot of Triangle Studio in Culver City, California. The village set had previously been used for the Bessie Barriscale film Wooden Shoes (1917) and In Slumberland (1917).
