= In the Mountains of Virginia =

- Produced by: G.P. Hamilton
- Starring: Harry Van Meter; Jacques Jaccard; Louise Lester
- Distributed by: Mutual Film
- Release date: October 25, 1913
- Country: United States
- Languages: Silent film English intertitles

In the Mountains of Virginia is a 1913 American silent short drama film directed by G.P. Hamilton starring Harry Van Meter, Jacques Jaccard, Louise Lester, Charles Morrison, Jack Richardson, and Vivian Rich.

== Plot ==
This plot summary was published in The Moving Picture World for October 4, 1913:

Handsome Dr. Morse goes to the mountains of Virginia for his vacation. He stops at the cabin of an old moonshiner, Tom Vernon.

Vernon's charming daughter, Ida, and the doctor not only become very warm friends in a very short time, but soon develop a very marked infatuation for each other. As there appears to be no valid reason for Vernon interposing objection, he readily consents. But Jeff Hardy, an old sweetheart of Ida's, becomes extremely jealous and plots to rid himself of his successful rival. He forges a communication purporting to be sent by the chief of revenue officers to Dr. Morse and plants this in the doctor's coat pocket. At the same time he leaves an anonymous communication for Vernon, accusing Dr. Morse of being a government officer. A search of the doctor's effects reveals the planted letter. Accordingly be is taken in charge by Vernon and Hardy and brought to trial before the moonshiner's court. His fate is sealed, but through a daring feat be escapes without serious injury. In wending his way through the woods he passes a cabin, at the door of which he finds the prostrate form of a woman. Despite the great danger to himself, he carries the woman into the cabin and ministers to her wants. While thus engaged. Hardy enters and It proves that the afflicted woman is Hardy's mother. The doctor sends him to the Vernon home for his medicine case and after an all night vigil and strenuous work on the part of the doctor Mrs. Hardy resuscitates and progresses nicely For this kindly deed Jeff Hardy is very grateful to the doctor and his first act is to write a letter to Vernon confessing his plot which was prompted by his own love for Ida Vernon. Cleared of the suspicion against him, Vernon readily consents to the marriage of the doctor and Ida.

== Cast ==
- Harry von Meter as Dr. Morse
- Vivian Rich as Ida Vernon
- Jack Richardson as Jeff Hardy
- Frank Bertram as Tom Vernon
- Louise Lester as Mrs. Hardy - Jeff's Mother
- Chick Morrison as Leader of the Moonshiners
- Jacques Jaccard as Tom Jenkins
