= The Dark Road (1917 film) =

1917 film

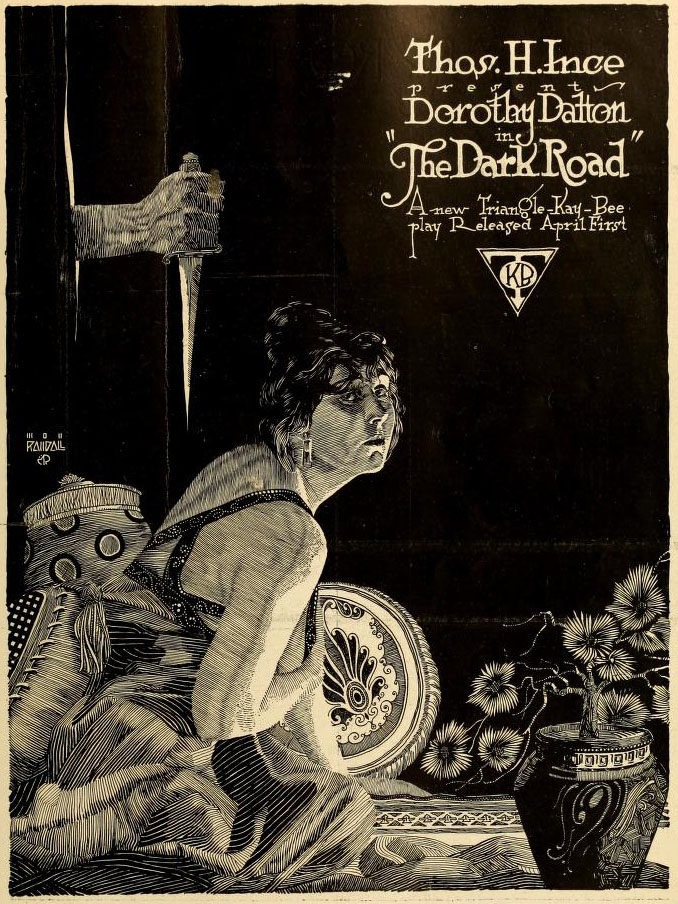
- Directed by: Charles Miller
- Written by: J.G. Hawks; John Lynch
- Produced by: Thomas H. Ince
- Starring: Dorothy Dalton; Robert McKim; John Gilbert
- Cinematography: Clyde De Vinna
- Production companies: Kay-Bee Pictures; New York Motion Picture
- Distributed by: Triangle Distributing
- Release date: April 1, 1917
- Running time: 50 minutes
- Country: United States
- Languages: Silent; English intertitles

The Dark Road is a 1917 American silent drama film directed by Charles Miller and starring Dorothy Dalton, Robert McKim and John Gilbert. The film's sets were designed by the art director Robert Brunton.

It is set in England during World War I, where the adulterous wife of a British army officer becomes entangled with a German spy.

== Cast ==
- Dorothy Dalton as Cleo Morrison
- Robert McKim as Carlos Costa
- Jack Livingston as Capt. James Morrison
- John Gilbert as Cedric Constable
- Walt Whitman as Sir John Constable
- Lydia Knott as Lady Mary Constable

== Preservation ==
With no prints of The Dark Road located in any film archives, it is considered a lost film.

== Bibliography ==
- Robert B. Connelly. The Silents: Silent Feature Films, 1910-36, Volume 40, Issue 2. December Press, 1998.
