= Wild Winship's Widow =

1917 film

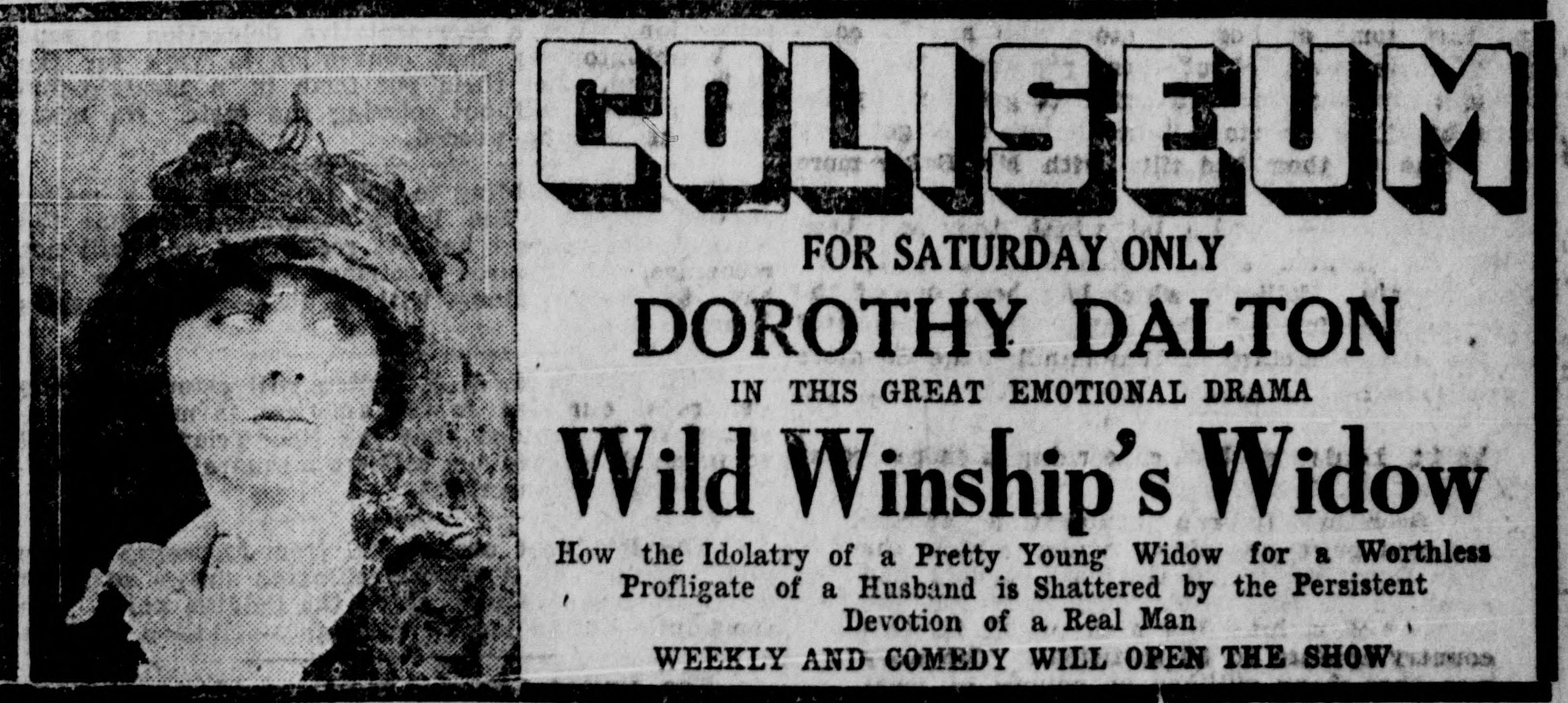
- Contemporary advertisement
- Directed by: Charles Miller
- Written by: John Lynch
- Produced by: Thomas H. Ince
- Starring: Dorothy Dalton; Rowland V. Lee; Joe King
- Cinematography: Clyde De Vinna
- Production companies: Kay-Bee Pictures; New York Motion Picture
- Distributed by: Triangle Distributing
- Release date: May 20, 1917
- Running time: 50 minutes
- Country: United States
- Languages: Silent; English intertitles

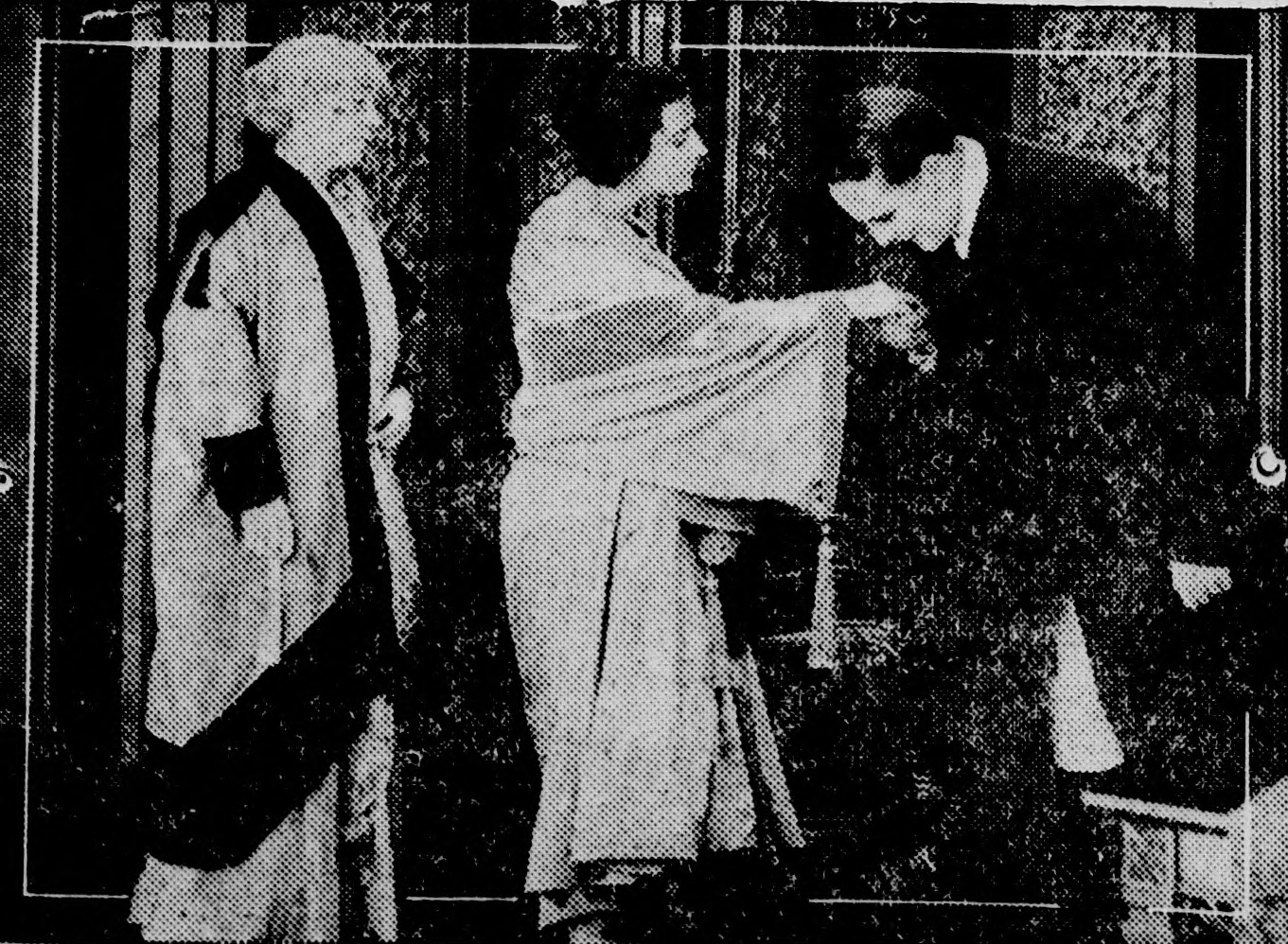
Scene from the film

Wild Winship's Widow is a 1917 American silent comedy film directed by Charles Miller and starring Dorothy Dalton, Rowland V. Lee and Joe King. With no holdings in archives, it is a lost film.

== Cast ==
- Dorothy Dalton as Catherine Winship
- Rowland V. Lee as Archibald Herndon
- Joe King as Morley Morgan
- Lillian Hayward as Aunt Minerva
- Alice Terry as Marjory Howe

== Bibliography ==
- Flom, Eric. L. Silent Film Stars on the Stages of Seattle: A History of Performances by Hollywood Notables. McFarland, 2009.
