= The Sawdust Ring =

1917 silent film by Charles Miller, Paul Powell

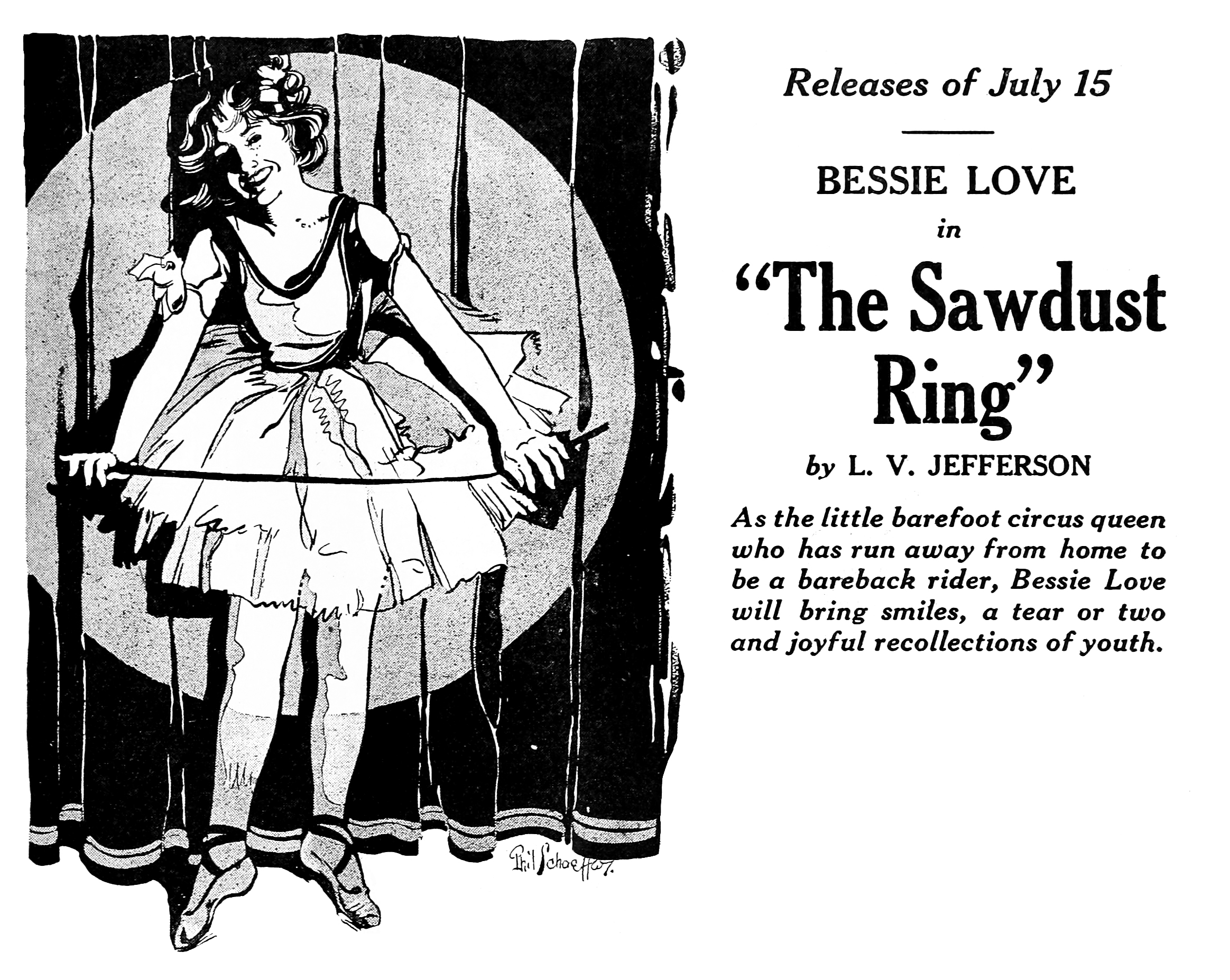
- Magazine advertisement
- Directed by: Charles Miller; Paul Powell
- Written by: L. V. Jefferson
- Produced by: Thomas H. Ince
- Starring: Bessie Love
- Cinematography: Clyde De Vinna; Harry Bredesen
- Production company: New York Motion Picture Corporation
- Distributed by: Triangle Film Corporation
- Release date: July 15, 1917 (U.S.)
- Running time: 5 reels
- Country: United States
- Language: Silent (English intertitles)

The Sawdust Ring (also known as The Little Equestrienne) is a 1917 American silent drama film distributed by the Triangle Film Corporation and starring Bessie Love. A shortened version of the film survives in 9.5 mm reduction print at Cineteca Nazionale, Pacific Film Archive, and the BFI National Archive. The film has also been released, in its shortened version, by Harpodeon.

== Plot ==
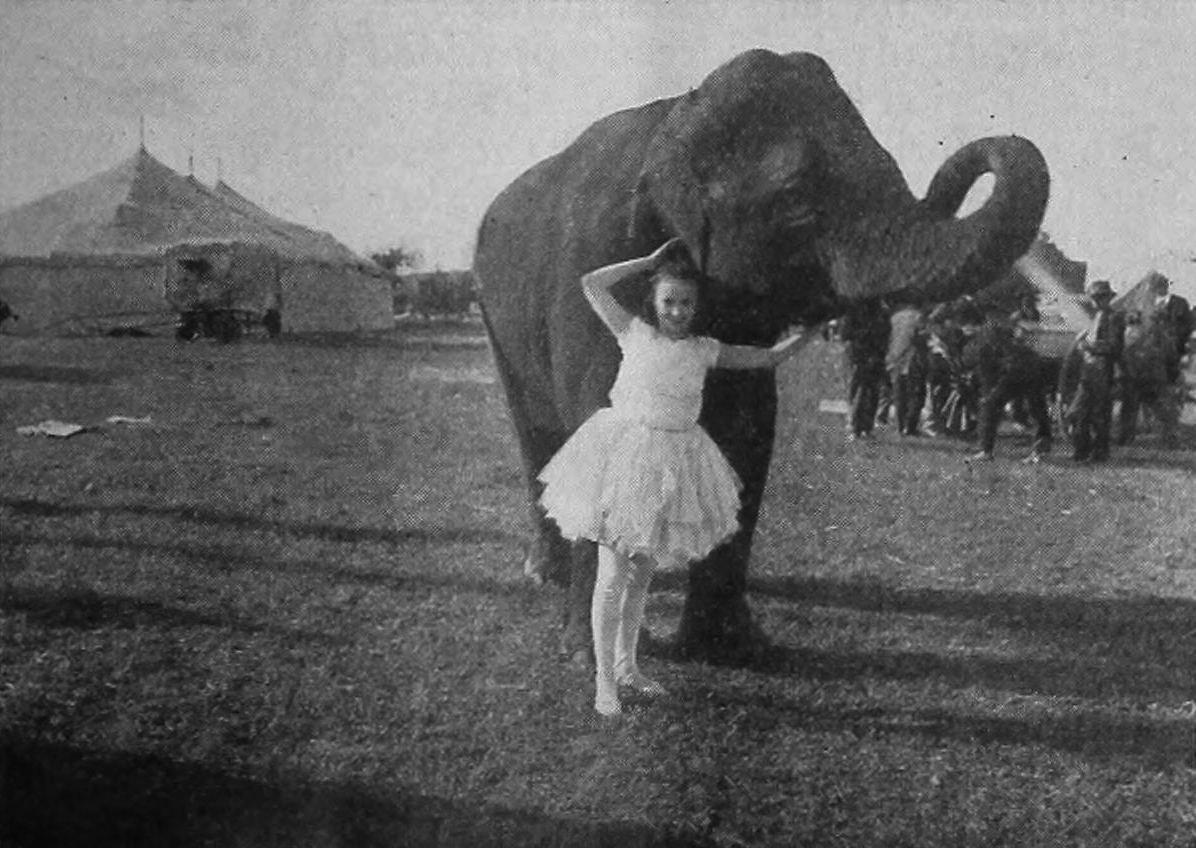
Janet Magie (Love) and an elephant

Two children who want to become circus performers run away from home. The mother of the girl is ill and has been sent to the hospital, while the father of the boy is a junk dealer. They finally arrive at the circus of Colonel Simmonds and obtain employment. When Janet Magie falls from a horse, Simmonds learns that she is actually his daughter and through her is able to contact his wife, who had left him due to a misunderstanding. This results in a happy reunion.

== Cast ==
- Bessie Love as Janet Magie
- Harold Goodwin as Peter Weldon
- Jack Richardson as Colonel Simmonds
- Josephine Headley as Mrs. Magie
- Daisy Dean as Paquita
- Alfred Hollingsworth as Steve Weldon
