= Open Your Eyes (1919 film) =

1919 film directed by Gilbert P. Hamilton

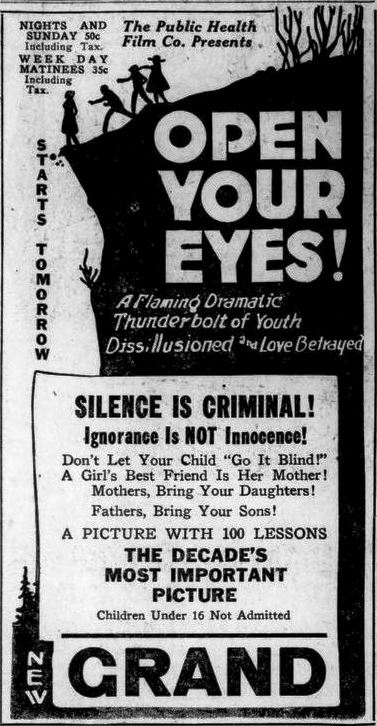
- Advertising for Open Your Eye from Duluth Herald (January 28, 1922).
- Directed by: Gilbert P. Hamilton
- Written by: C.B. Minty; Sam Warner
- Starring: Faire Binney; Mrs. Joupert; Jack Hopkins; Halbert Brown; Eddie Beryll; Emily Marceau; Viola Allen; Ben Lyon; Gaston Glass
- Production companies: State Health Films Inc. Warner Bros.
- Distributed by: Warner Bros.
- Release date: May 1919
- Running time: 70 minutes
- Country: United States
- Language: Silent (English intertitles)

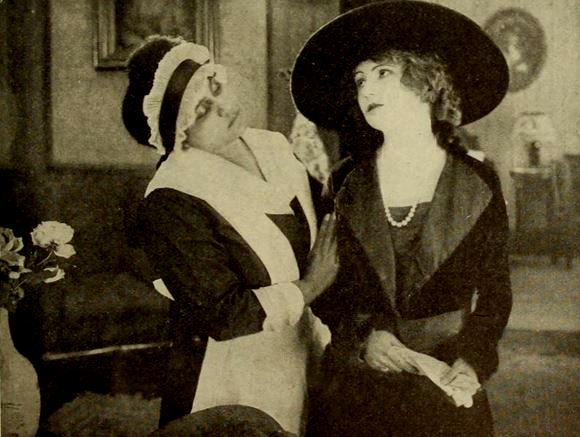
Still with scene from the film.

Open Your Eyes is a 1919 American silent drama film directed by Gilbert P. Hamilton, and starring Faire Binney, Mrs. Joupert, Jack Hopkins, Halbert Brown, Eddie Beryll, Emily Marceau, Viola Allen, Ben Lyon, and Gaston Glass. Intended to warn about venereal disease and shot in The Bronx in 1917, the film was given a general release by Warner Bros. in May 1919. Jack L. Warner, one of the founders of Warner Bros., has a cameo appearance as a World War I soldier.

== Cast ==
- Faire Binney as Kitty Walton
- Mrs. Joupert as Mrs. Walton
- Jack Hopkins as Mr. Walton
- Halbert Brown as Dr. Bennett
- Eddie Beryll as Eddie Samson
- Emily Marceau as Frances Forrester
- Viola Allen as Mrs. Forrester
- Ben Lyon as Harold Connors
- Gaston Glass
- Jack L. Warner as Soldier

== Reception ==
As a sex hygiene film, Open Your Eyes was subject to censorship restrictions and often was shown as an adults only film, but continued to be shown as an exploitation film. In 1927, the New Jersey branch of the Motion Picture Theater Owners of America warned theaters not to show this "salacious and risqué" film, citing common decency and the risk that it would bring calls for censorship.

== Preservation ==
A print of the film reportedly survives in a foreign archive.

== See also ==
- List of sex hygiene films
