= Colonel Custard's Last Stand =

1914 film by Richard Garrick

Colonel Custard's Last Stand is a 1914 one-reel silent movie comedy about Custer's Last Stand and starred Lloyd Hamilton as Colonel Custard and featured Betty Burbridge, James Douglass, Harry Russell and Mai Wells. The film was directed by Richard Garrick and was released on 19 March 1914.

The slapstick comedy was made by the St. Louis Motion Picture Company and the Frontier Motion Picture Company. It was distributed by Universal Film Manufacturing Company.

== Synopsis ==
While trying to break up his daughter's romance Colonel Custard unknowingly puts an Indian tribe on the warpath led by Chief Standing Cowski.
