= Charles Miller (director) =

American actor and director

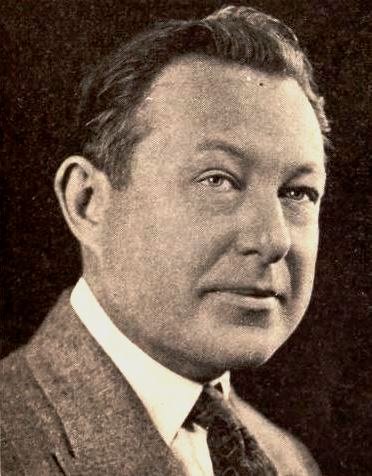
- Miller in 1918
- Born: Charles A. Miller; 1857; Saginaw, Michigan, U.S.
- Died: November 14, 1936 (aged 78–79); New York City, U.S.

Charles A. Miller (1857 – November 14, 1936) was an American actor and silent film director. Before taking up directing, he was an actor.

Miller was born in Saginaw, Michigan and died in New York City.

== Selected filmography ==
=== Actor ===
- The Road to Ruin (1928)

=== Director ===
- O Mimi San (unconfirmed) (1914)
- The Courtship of O San (1914)
- Plain Jane (1916)
- A Corner in Colleens (1916)
- The Little Brother (1917)
- Blood Will Tell (1917)
- The Dark Road (1917)
- Wild Winship's Widow (1917)
- Princess of the Dark (1917)
- Wild Winship's Widow (1917)
- Bawbs o' the Blue Ridge (1917)
- The Hater of Men (1917)
- The Flame of the Yukon (1917)
- The Sawdust Ring (1917)
- Wee Lady Betty (1917)
- Polly Ann (1917)
- The Secret of the Storm Country (1917)
- The Ghosts of Yesterday (1918)
- By Right of Purchase (1918)
- Unfaithful (1918) – short film
- At the Mercy of Men (1918)
- The Fair Pretender (1918)
- The Service Star (1918)
- The Great Victory, Wilson or the Kaiser? The Fall of the Hohenzollerns (1919)
- Why Germany Must Pay (1919)
- A Dangerous Affair (1919)
- Love, Honor and -- ? (1919)
- High Speed (1920)
- The Law of the Yukon (1920)
- The Man She Brought Back (1922)
- The Ship of Souls (1925)
