= The Scoffer =

1920 film by Allan Dwan

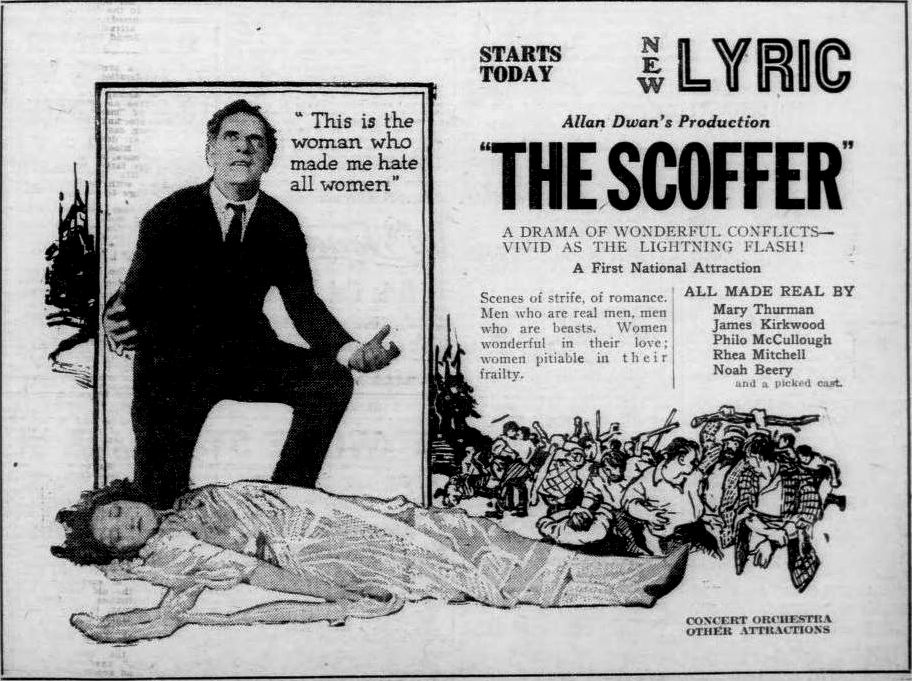
- Newspaper advertisement
- Directed by: Allan Dwan
- Written by: Lillian Ducey; Val Cleveland
- Produced by: Allan Dwan; Mayflower Photoplay Company
- Starring: Mary Thurman; James Kirkwood
- Cinematography: H. Lyman Broening (credited as Henry Broening)
- Distributed by: Associated First National Pictures
- Release date: September 1920
- Running time: 7 reels
- Country: United States
- Language: Silent (English intertitles)

The Scoffer is a surviving 1920 American silent drama film produced and directed by Allan Dwan and starring Mary Thurman. It was released through Associated First National Pictures.

== Plot ==
As described in a film magazine, Dr. Stannard Wayne, a worker for humanity, Dr. Arthur Richards, a charlatan, and Carson the Parson, a missionary worker, are firm friends until a victim of Richards' malpractice dies and Wayne is sentenced to five years imprisonment for the crime. Richards persuades Dr. Wayne's wife to obtain a divorce and marries her. Wayne denounces God and vows never again will he use his ability in the interests of mankind. Released from prison, he finds his way to a northern settlement where Richards and his wife, now a physical wreck, are living. Here he refuses aid to those who are in sickness and misery, and preaches against Divinity. Alice Porn, keeper of the general store, challenges him to prove that man is superior to God by curing a crippled child. After several complications, he begins the operation during a great electrical storm. The elements and his enemies combine to thwart the purpose of the operation, and facing defeat he prays for aid. This aid comes in a form which may or may not be supernatural, as an observer may prefer, and after a time happiness ensues.

== Cast ==
- Mary Thurman as Margaret Haddon
- James Kirkwood as Dr. Stannard Wayne
- Philo McCullough as Dr. Arthur Richards
- Rhea Mitchell as Alice Porn
- John Burton as Old Dabney
- Noah Beery as Boorman
- Eugenie Besserer as Boorman's Wife
- Georgie Stone as Boorman's son
- Bernard Durning as Carson the Parson
- Ward Crane as 'The Albany Kid'

== Preservation status ==
A print of The Scoffer is preserved by the Library of Congress.
