= The Warning (1927 film) =

1927 film

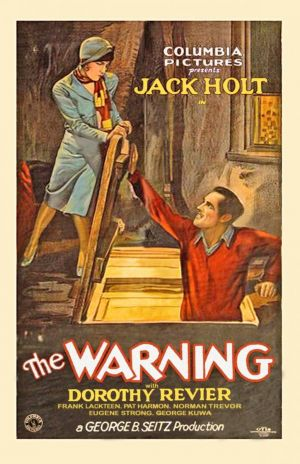
- Film poster
- Directed by: George B. Seitz
- Written by: H. Milner Kitchin; Lillian Ducey; George B. Seitz
- Produced by: Harry Cohn
- Starring: Jack Holt
- Cinematography: Ray June
- Edited by: Robert E. Lee
- Distributed by: Columbia Pictures
- Release date: November 26, 1927
- Running time: 56 minutes
- Country: United States
- Language: Silent

The Warning is a 1927 American silent drama film directed by George B. Seitz. A surviving print of the film is at George Eastman House Motion Picture Collection.

== Cast ==
- Jack Holt as Tom Fellows / Col. Robert Wellsley
- Dorothy Revier as Mary Blake
- Frank Lackteen as Tso Lin
- Pat Harmon as London Charlie
- Eugene Strong as No. 24
- George Kuwa as Ah Sung
- Norman Trevor as Sir James Gordon
