= Behind Closed Doors (1929 film) =

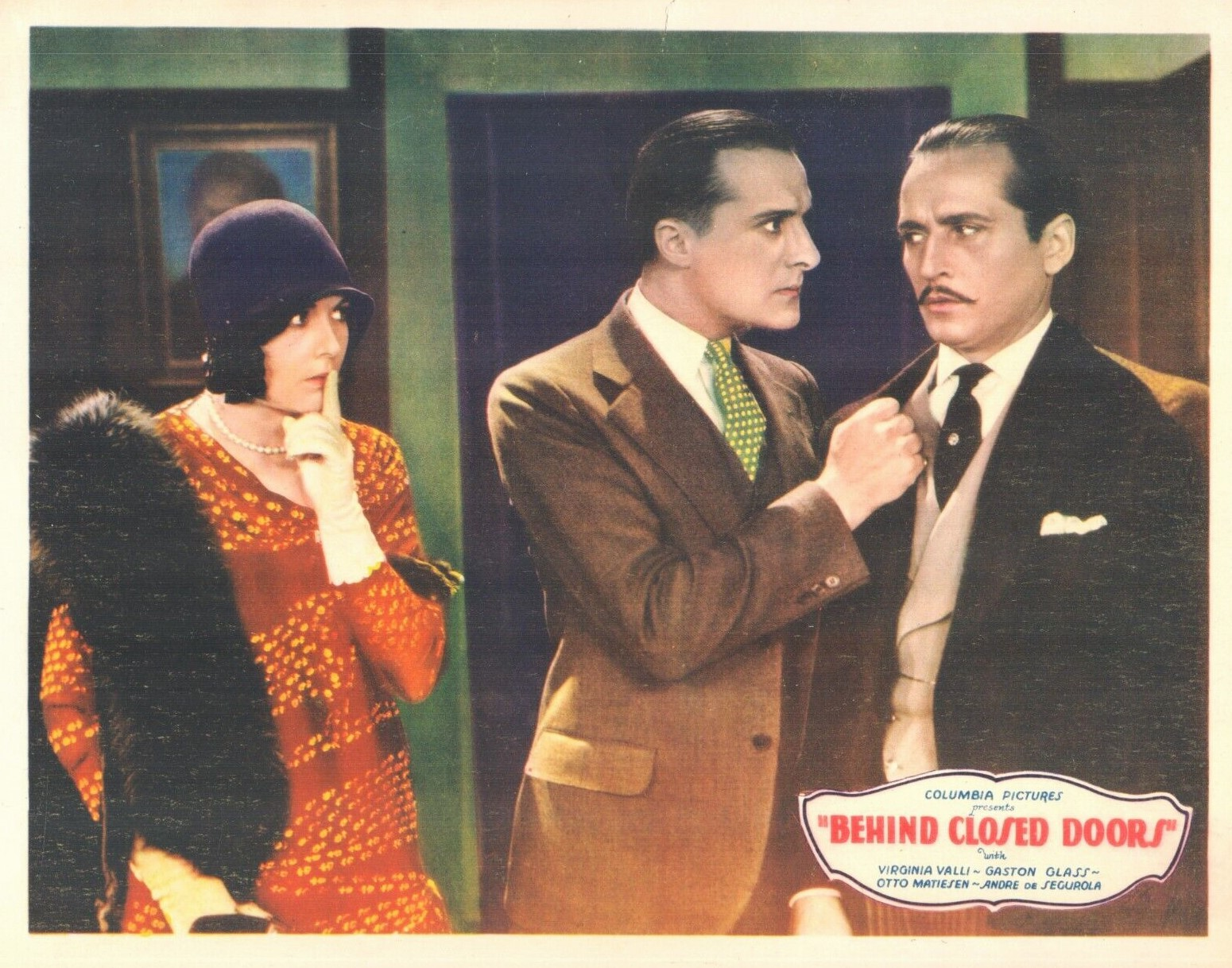
- Lobby card
- Directed by: Roy William Neill
- Screenplay by: Howard J. Green
- Story by: Lillian Ducey; H. Milner Kitchin
- Produced by: Harry Cohn
- Starring: Virginia Valli; Gaston Glass; Otto Matiesen
- Cinematography: Ted Tetzlaff
- Edited by: Ben Pivar
- Production company: Columbia Pictures
- Distributed by: Columbia Pictures
- Release date: February 24, 1929
- Running time: 6 reels
- Country: United States
- Language: Silent (English intertitles)

Behind Closed Doors is a lost 1929 American silent mystery film directed by Roy William Neill. It was distributed by Columbia Pictures.

== Plot ==
According to an April 1929 edition of Harrison's Reports, the film revolves around the efforts of the royalists to attempt to raise enough money to overthrow the ruling power of the newly made republic. An agent of the republic (hero) is sent to America to find out where the leaks were occurring whereby the royalists knew what was going on. He meets the heroine, a singer, entertaining the Ambassador's party, arranged by his aunt (the real spy) and falls in love with her. But the compromising situations in which she is found by the hero led him to believe that she was the spy until she disclosed her identity and she proved to be a Department of Justice employee, trying to find the leaks in the embassy, too. After the mystery is solved, they resume their friendship and all is well.

== Cast ==
- Virginia Valli as Nina Laska
- Gaston Glass as Fred Baher
- Otto Matiesen as Max Randolph
- Andrés de Segurola as Henrick Schield
- Fanny Midgley as Mother Schield
- Torben Meyer as Captain von Gilden
- Broderick O'Farrell as John Barton

== Reception ==
A reviewer in an April 1929 edition of Variety gave the film a negative review, criticizing the performance, and a perceived lack of a film plot.

A 1929 edition of Harrison's Reports was also critical of the performance in the film. On the other hand, a 1929 review in the Palladium-Item praised the performance.
