= A Master Stroke =

1920 silent film

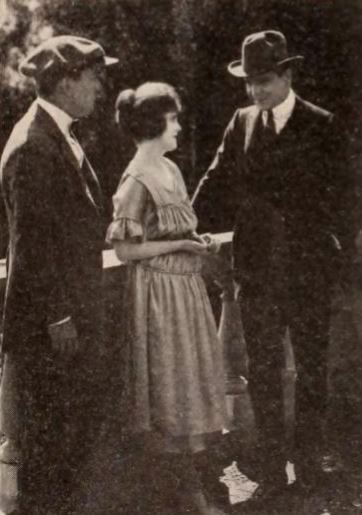
- Directed by: Chester Bennett
- Written by: Frederic Van Rensselaer Dey (novel); Lucien Hubbard; H. Thomson Rich
- Starring: Earle Williams; Vola Vale; Lee Hill
- Production company: Vitagraph Company of America
- Distributed by: Vitagraph Company of America
- Release date: June 1920
- Running time: 50 minutes
- Country: United States
- Languages: Silent; English intertitles

A Master Stroke is a 1920 American silent comedy film directed by Chester Bennett and starring Earle Williams, Vola Vale and Lee Hill.

== Cast ==
- Earle Williams as Yale Durant
- Vola Vale as Minnie Patton
- Lee Hill as Jack Millington
- Henry A. Barrows as Sam Millington
- John Elliott as George Trevor
- Rhea Haines as Blanche Trevor
- Frank Crayne as Harry Chapman
- Paul Weigel as Hodge

== Bibliography ==
- Paul C. Spehr & Gunnar Lundquist. American Film Personnel and Company Credits, 1908-1920. McFarland, 1996.
