= Lillian Ducey =

American screenwriter

- Born: Lillian Beiderlinden; November 26, 1878; New York, New York, USA
- Died: December 9, 1952 (aged 74); Los Angeles, California, USA
- Occupation(s): Screenwriter, film director
- Spouse: William Ducey

Lillian Ducey (née Beiderlinden; November 26, 1878 – December 9, 1952) was an American screenwriter and director active during Hollywood's silent era. She's noted for being one of the first American women to direct a feature-length film (1923's Enemies of Children); she also worked on over a dozen scripts between 1918 and 1930.

== Biography ==
Born to Edmund Beiderlinden and Hannah Mueller in New York, Lillian was the eldest of two daughters. She married William Ducey in the late 1890s; the pair had a daughter but eventually separated in the 1910s.

She began to craft a writing career for herself in her early 1930s, winning a short story contest before gaining bylines in publications like Harper's Bazaar, McCall's, and Redbook.

In 1918, she began writing films; that year, both His Enemy, the Law and Captain of His Soul were released by Triangle Film Co. She would soon collaborate with David O. Selznick on films like The Spite Bride, as well as Eric von Stroheim on Blind Husbands and Allan Dwan on The Scoffer.

In 1923, she received her first (and as far as anyone knows, only) chance to direct a feature, Enemies of the Children, which she also wrote. Only a handful of women were directing films at the time, and Ducey's work on the film was well-regarded by critics.

She retired from screenwriting in the 1930s, and died in 1952 in Los Angeles.

== Selected filmography ==
As a writer/director:

- Enemies of Children (1923)

As a writer:

- The Climax (1930)
- Behind Closed Doors (1929)
- The Devil's Apple Tree (1929)
- The Warning (1927)
- The Lullaby (1924)
- A Broken Doll (1921)
- In the Heart of a Fool (1920)
- The Scoffer (1920)
- Blind Husbands (1919)
- The Spite Bride (1919)
- Upstairs and Down (1919)
- His Enemy, the Law (1918)
- Captain of His Soul (1918)
