= Passing Through (1921 film) =

1921 film by William A. Seiter

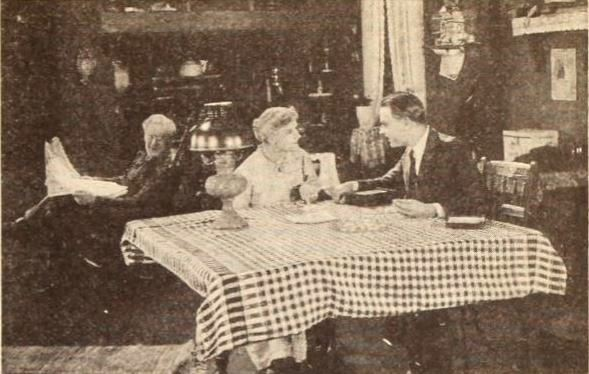
- Film still
- Directed by: William A. Seiter
- Screenplay by: Agnes Christine Johnston; Joseph F. Poland
- Produced by: Thomas H. Ince
- Starring: Douglas MacLean; Madge Bellamy; Otto Hoffman; Cameron Coffey; Fred Gamble; Bert Hadley; Margaret Livingston
- Cinematography: Bert Cann
- Production companies: Thomas H. Ince Corporation; Famous Players–Lasky Corporation
- Distributed by: Paramount Pictures
- Release date: August 14, 1921
- Running time: 50 minutes
- Country: United States
- Language: Silent (English intertitles)

Passing Through (also known as Passing Thru) is a 1921 American silent comedy drama film, directed by William A. Seiter and written by Agnes Christine Johnston, and Joseph F. Poland. The film stars Douglas MacLean, Madge Bellamy, Otto Hoffman, Cameron Coffey, Fred Gamble, Bert Hadley, and Margaret Livingston. The film was released on August 14, 1921, by Paramount Pictures. It is not known whether the film currently survives, which suggests that it is a lost film.

== Cast ==
- Douglas MacLean as Billy Barton
- Madge Bellamy as Mary Spivins
- Otto Hoffman as James Spivins
- Cameron Coffey as Willie Spivins
- Fred Gamble as Hezikah Briggs
- Bert Hadley as Henry Kingston
- Margaret Livingston as Louise Kingston
- Louis Natheaux as Fred Kingston
- Willis Robards as Silas Harkins
- Edith Yorke as Mother Harkins
