= Clyde De Vinna =

American cinematographer

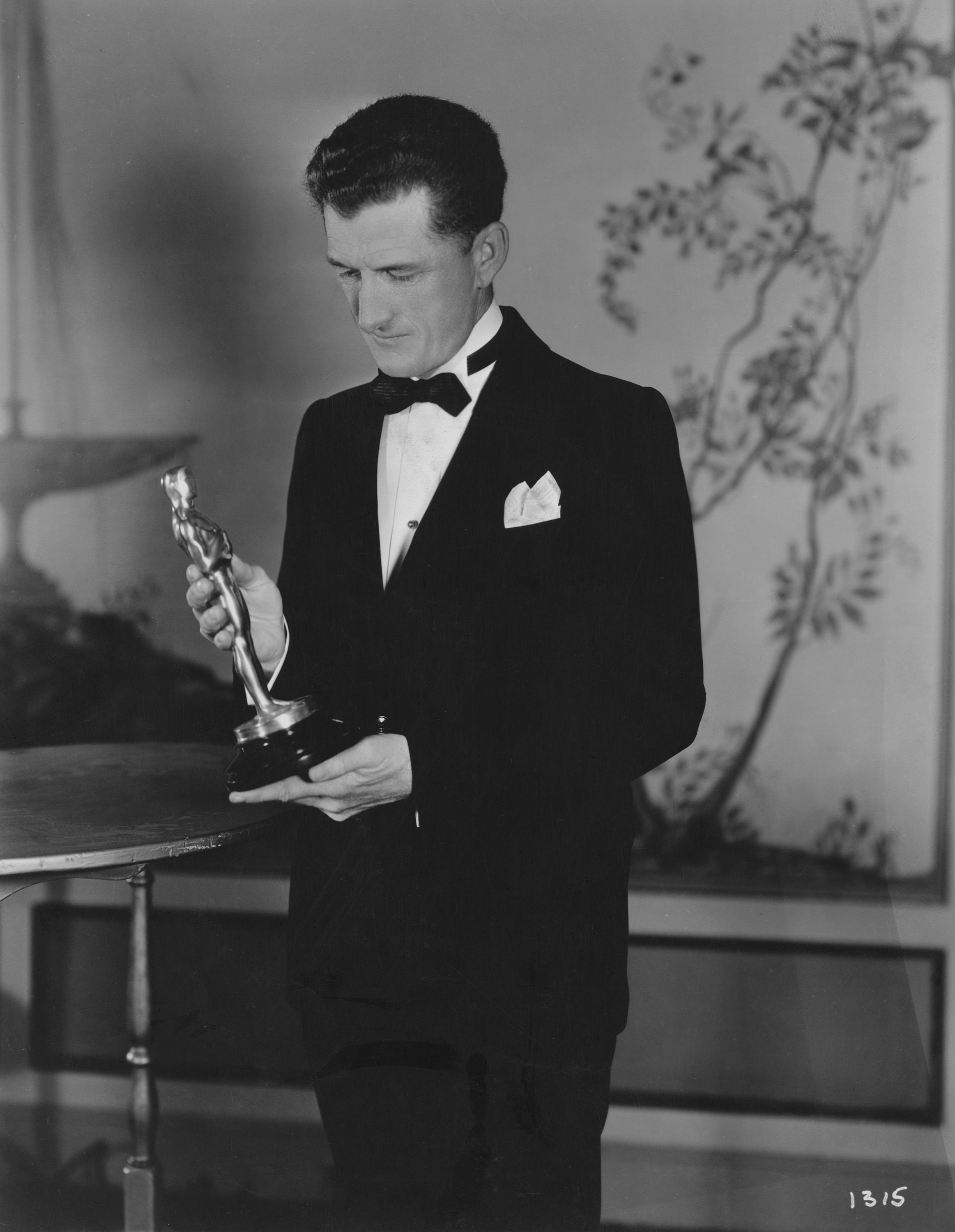
- De Vinna at 2nd Academy Awards in 1930
- Born: July 13, 1890; Sedalia, Missouri, U.S.
- Died: July 26, 1953 (aged 63); Los Angeles, California, U.S.
- Other names: Clyde Da Vinna; Capt. Clyde DeVinna; Clyde DeVinna
- Education: University of Arkansas
- Occupations: Cinematographer; Director of photography
- Years active: 1915–1953
- Organization: American Society of Cinematographers
- Notable work: White Shadows in the South Seas
- Awards: Academy Award

Clyde De Vinna (July 13, 1890, in Sedalia, Missouri – July 26, 1953, in Los Angeles, California) was an American film and television cinematographer and director of photography. He won the Academy Award for Best Cinematography for White Shadows in the South Seas presented by the Academy of Motion Picture Arts and Sciences in 1930 at its 2nd Academy Awards show.

== Career ==
De Vinna was cinematographer on over 120 film and television projects from 1916 through 1953. He graduated from the University of Arkansas and began his career began when he joined Inceville studios in 1915 as First Cameraman. In 1916, he shot The Raiders, the first film to be shot at what was to become MGM. He was also an avid ham radio enthusiast, serving as an army radio operator, and carrying a portable transmitter with him on all location shoots. While shooting Trader Horn (1931) on location in Kenya, he seconded as the project's ham radio operator, keeping the production crew in the African bush in contact with its base camp in Nairobi.

When on location in Alaska for 11 months for the filming of Eskimo (1933), he kept the production company in contact with its base. While working in a small shack made air-tight against the cold, De Vinna was in short wave contact with a ham operator in New Zealand, and was overcome by carbon monoxide fumes emitted by his gasoline heater. When De Vinna's keystrokes faltered, the ham in New Zealand realized something was wrong, and put out a call for help to a ham in Hawaii, who in turn relayed the message to a ham in Alaska, which led to De Vinna receiving the necessary emergency aid.

De Vinna's life as a cameraman, world traveler, and adventurer was captured in the 1939 Pete Smith MGM short film Radio Hams, written by Buddy Adler and directed by Felix E. Feist, with actor Alonzo Price starring as Clyde De Vinna.

De Vinna was also accomplished in aerial cinematography. His scenes shot in Air Cadet (1951), were referred to as "exciting air sequences" that were the "true highlights in this routine drama".

== Partial filmography ==
- The Captive God (1916)
- The Three Musketeers (1916)
- Civilization (1916)
- The Little Brother (1917)
- The Sawdust Ring (1917)
- Wild Winship's Widow (1917)
- The Dark Road (1917)
- Blood Will Tell (1917)
- Princess of the Dark (1917)
- Within the Cup (1918)
- Maid o' the Storm (1918)
- Madam Who? (1918)
- Patriotism (1918)
- Unfaithful (1918)
- Blindfolded (1918)
- Rose o' Paradise (1918)
- Adele (1919)
- Cupid Forecloses (1919)
- Over the Garden Wall (1919)
- A Yankee Princess (1919)
- The Little Boss (1919)
- Playthings of Passion (1919)
- The Iron Rider (1920)
- Leave It to Me (1920)
- Twins of Suffering Creek (1920)
- The Face of the World (1921)
- The Cheater Reformed (1921)
- Lost and Found on a South Sea Island (1923)
- Crimson Gold (1923)
- The Victor (1923)
- The Wild Party (1923)
- Where is This West? (1923)
- Sporting Youth (1924)
- The Man in Blue (1925)
- Ben-Hur (1925)
- War Paint (1926)
- Winners of the Wilderness (1927)
- California (1927)
- The Frontiersman (1927)
- Foreign Devils (1927)
- The Law of the Range (1928)
- Wickedness Preferred (1928)
- Wyoming (1928)
- The Adventurer (1928)
- White Shadows in the South Seas (1928)
- The Pagan (1929)
- Trader Horn (1931)
- Shipmates (1931)
- Politics (1931)
- Tarzan the Ape Man (1932)
- Bird of Paradise (1932)
- Eskimo (1933)
- Tarzan and His Mate (1934)
- Lazy River (1934)
- Viva Villa! (1934)
- Treasure Island (1934)
- West Point of the Air (1935)
- China Seas (1935)
- Ah, Wilderness! (1935)
- Old Hutch (1936)
- The Good Old Soak (1937)
- Saratoga (1937)
- Big City (1937)
- The Bad Man of Brimstone (1937)
- Of Human Hearts (1938)
- Fast Company (1938)
- Passing Parade (1938)
- Too Hot to Handle (1938)
- Football Romeo (1938)
- New Roadways (1939)
- Bridal Suit (1939)
- Unseen Guardians (1939)
- All About Hash (1940)
- The Hidden Master (1940)
- 20 Mule Team (1940)
- Bubbling Troubles (1940)
- Phantom Raiders (1940)
- Wyoming (1940)
- American Spoken Here (1940)
- Fightin' Fools (1941)
- The Bad Man (1941)
- The Penalty (1941)
- Barnacle Bill (1941)
- The People vs. Dr. Kildare (1941)
- Come Back, Miss Pipps (1941)
- Tarzan's Secret Treasure (1941)
- The Bugle Sounds (1942)
- A Yank on the Burma Road (1942)
- Jackass Mail (1942)
- Whistling in Dixie (1942)
- Rio Rita (1942)
- Ship Ahoy (1942)
- The Omaha Trail (1942)
- A Yank at Eton (1942)
- The Battle for the Marianas (1944)
- The Caribbean Mystery (1945)
- Within These Walls (1945)
- It's a Joke, Son! (1947)
- Sword of the Avenger (1948)
- The Jungle (1952)
- Air Cadet (1951)

== Television credits ==
- The Silver Theatre (2 episodes, 1950)
- The Roy Rogers Show (2 episodes, 1951–1952)
- I Married Joan (3 episodes, 1953)

== Awards ==
Year	Award	Category	Nominated work	Result	Ref.
1930	2nd Academy Awards	Academy Award for Best Cinematography	White Shadows in the South Seas	Won	
