= Captain of His Soul =

1918 film directed by Gilbert P. Hamilton

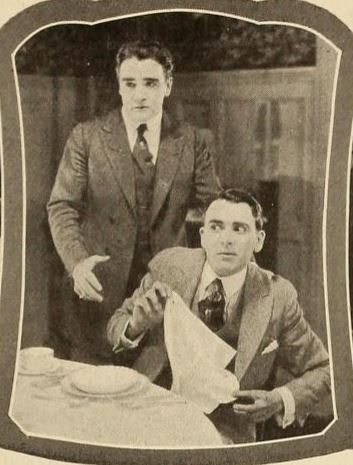
- Desmond and Gunn in Captain of His Soul
- Directed by: Gilbert P. Hamilton
- Written by: Lillian Ducey
- Based on: "Shackles" by Eleanor Talbot Kinkead
- Starring: William Desmond; Claire McDowell; Charles Gunn; Jack Richardson
- Cinematography: Tom Buckingham
- Production company: Triangle Film Corporation
- Distributed by: Triangle Film Corporation
- Release date: February 10, 1918

Captain of His Soul is a 1918 film directed by Gilbert P. Hamilton for Triangle Film Corporation. The scenario was adapted by Lillian Ducey from an Eleanor Talbot Kinkead magazine story, "Shackles."

== Plot ==
An aging man turns his pistol factory over to a new owner at the urging of his sons. Soon, however, he notices the new owner's corruption; the shock of this revelation triggers a heart attack, and the old man dies. Soon afterward, his sons suspect one another of murder.

== Cast ==
- William Desmond as Horace
- Claire McDowall as Annette
- Charles Gunn as Henry
- Jack Richardson as Martin
