= St. Louis Motion Picture Company =

American film production company

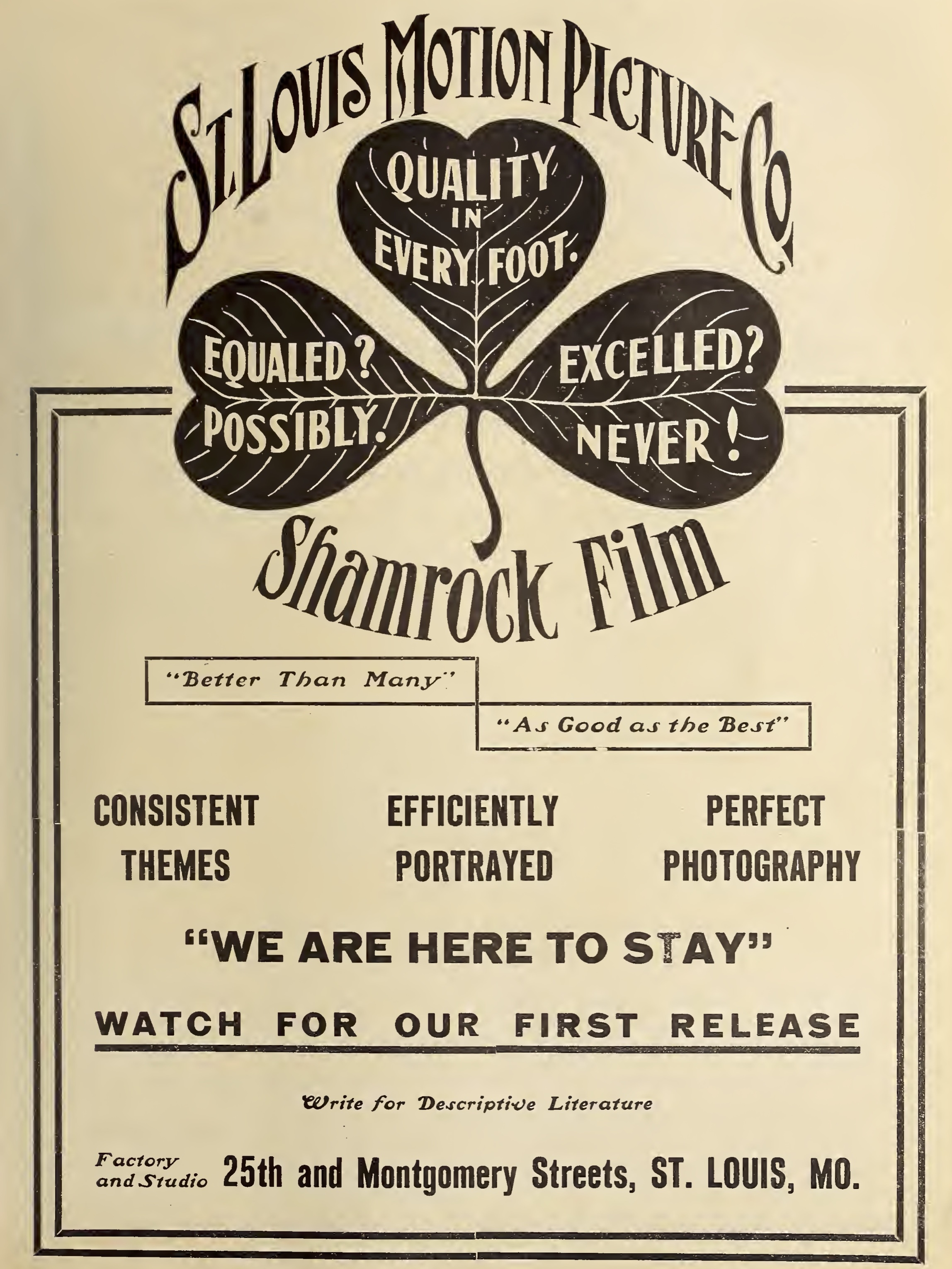
1911 magazine advertisement

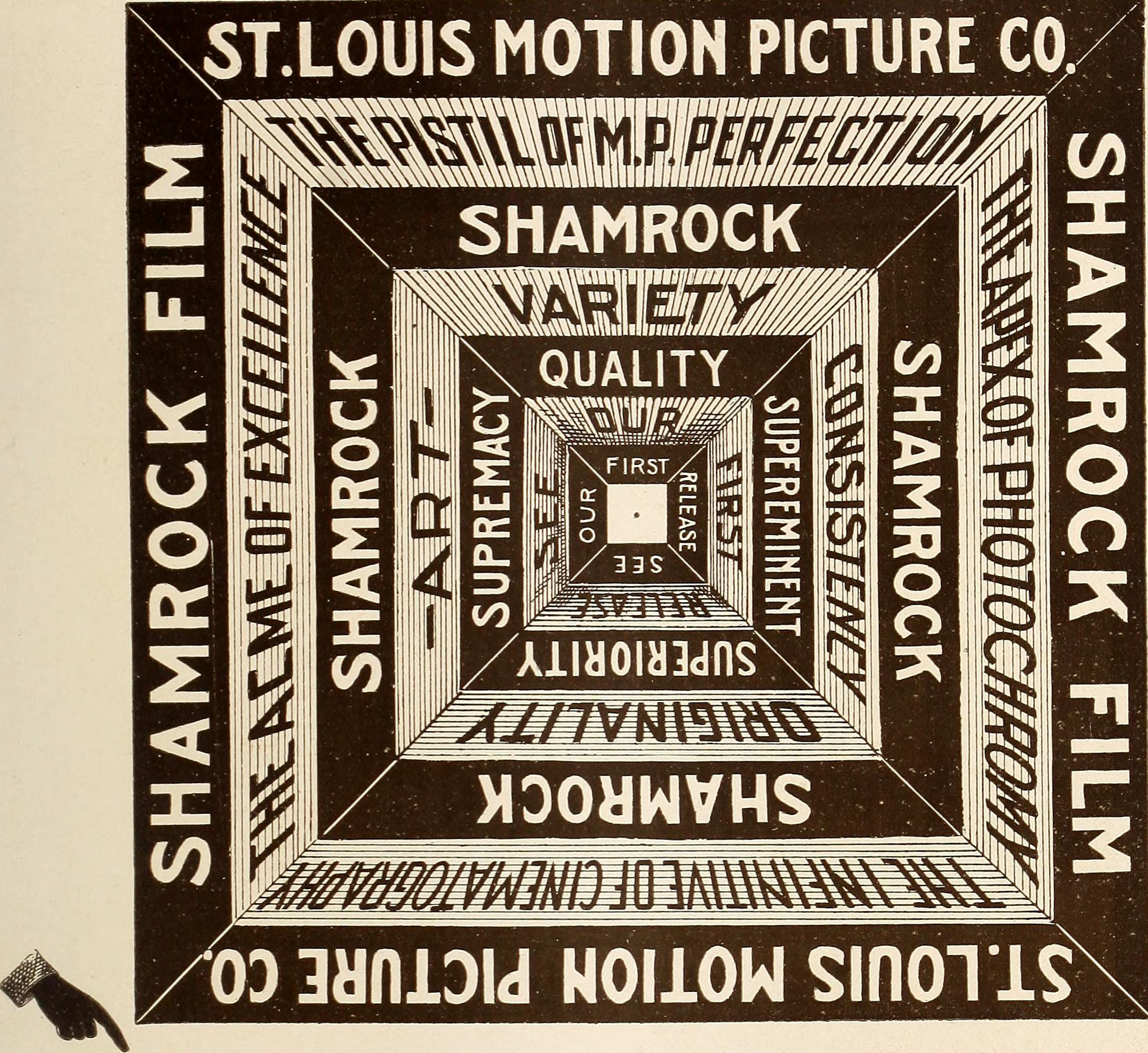
1911 ad from Moving Picture News

St. Louis Motion Picture Company was a film production company during the silent film era. It advertised its debut films A Gypsy's Love and Algernon's Busy Day in 1912. In 1913 the company established itself in Santa Paula, California.

St. Louis lawyer Oscar E. Goebel was the firm's initial president and treasurer. In 1913, the company bought Melie's Motion Picture Studio.

Vaudevillian Glen Cavender began his film career with the company. Cinematographer John F. Seitz followed Flying A executive Gilbert P. Hamilton to the company. Filmmaker Willis Robards also worked for the company.

In 1914, the company was contracted by the St. Louis Equal Suffrage League to produce a photoplay advancing the suffragist cause.

== Filmography ==
- A Gypsy's Love (1912)
- Algernon's Busy Day (1912)
- Peril of the Plains (1912)
- Colonel Custard's Last Stand (1914)
