= Paralta Plays =

1910s American film company

Paralta Plays was a film company in the United States in 1917-1918. It adopted its own distribution system. The company lasted about a year.

== Filmography ==
- Alimony (1917)
- A Man's Man (1918)
- Rose o' Paradise (1918)
- Madam Who? (1918)
- Shackled (1918)
- One Dollar Bid (1918)
- Wedlock (1918)
- His Robe of Honor (1918)
- Patriotism (1918 film) (1918)
- A Burglar for a Night (1918)
- The Turn of a Card (1918)
- Humdrum Brown (1918), distributor
- With Hoops of Steel (1918)
- Maid o' the Storm (1918)
- Within the Cup (1918)
- An Alien Enemy (1918)
- The One Woman based on The One Woman: A Story of Modern Utopia, a 1903 novel by Thomas Dixon Jr.
