= Rose o' Paradise =

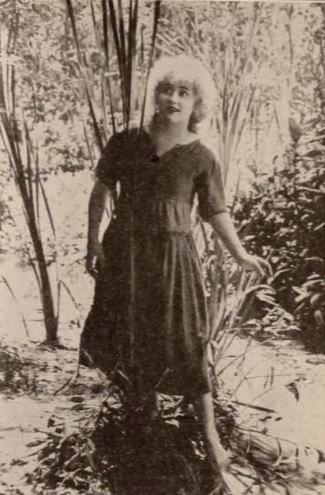
- Bessie Barriscale
- Directed by: James Young
- Written by: James Young (adaptation); Grace Miller White (novel)
- Starring: Bessie Barriscale
- Cinematography: Clyde De Vinna
- Production company: Paralta Plays
- Distributed by: W. W. Hodkinson Corporation; Pathé-Freres
- Release date: May 13, 1918
- Running time: 60 minutes
- Country: United States
- Languages: Silent; English titles

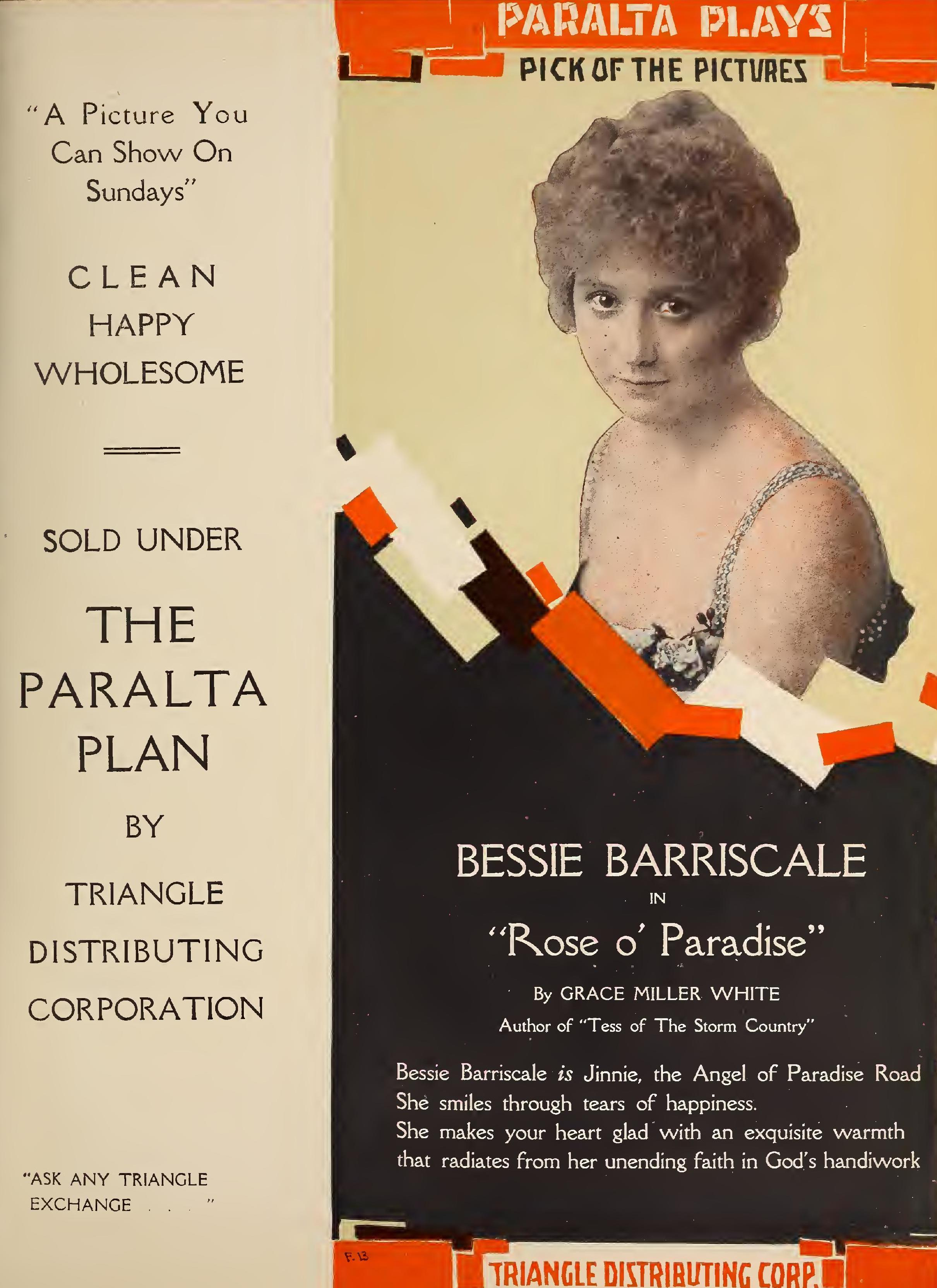
Rose o' Paradise ad in Motion Picture News, 1917

Rose o' Paradise is a 1918 American silent drama film directed by James Young and starring Bessie Barriscale. It was produced by Paralta Plays and distributed through W. W. Hodkinson Corporation, General Film Company and Pathé-Freres.

This was the first film produced under Bessie Barriscale's contract with Paralta Plays, however the first to be released was Madam Who? (1918).

== Cast ==
- Bessie Barriscale - Virginia Singleton
- Howard C. Hickman - Lafe Grandoken
- David Hartford - Jordon Morse
- Norman Kerry - Theodore King
- Edythe Chapman - Peg Grandoken
- William Delmar - Maudlin Bates
- Lucille Young - Molly Merriweather
- Arthur Allardt - Thomas Singleton

== Plot ==
Thomas Singleton has a nervous breakdown when his wife dies while giving birth to his daughter, Virginia, who survives the ordeal. He is committed to an asylum. When he recovers, his half-brother does not allow him to leave the asylum. Thomas escapes seventeen years later, as he fears his half-brother will steal the fortune his daughter is to inherit on her eighteenth birthday.

== Preservation ==
A complete print of Rose o' Paradise is held by the Cinémathèque française in Paris.
