= Wooden Shoes =

1917 film by Raymond B. West

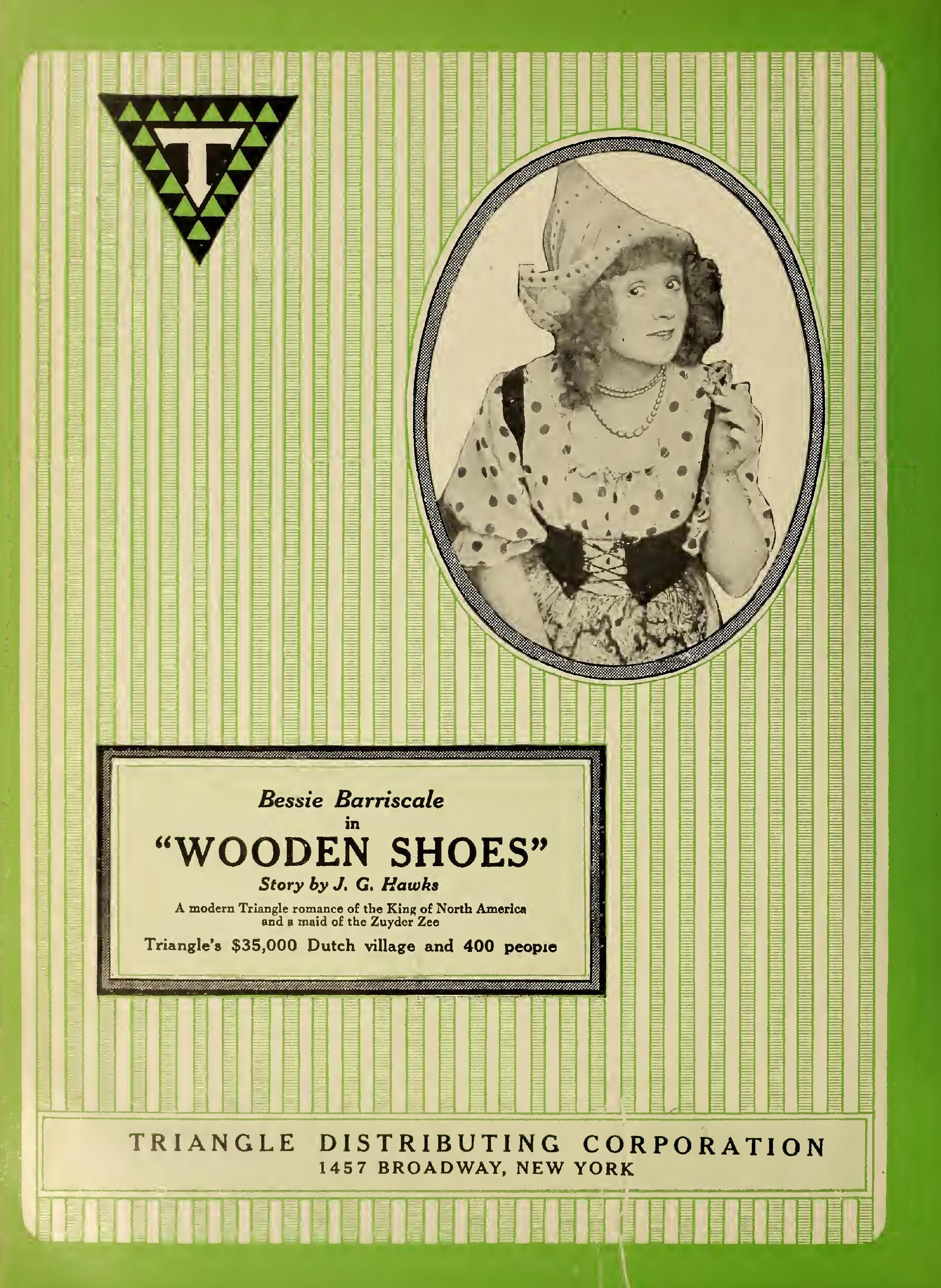
- Advertisement
- Directed by: Raymond B. West
- Written by: J. G. Hawks
- Starring: Bessie Barriscale; Jack Livingston; Joseph J. Dowling
- Cinematography: Charles J. Stumar
- Production company: Triangle Film Corporation
- Distributed by: Triangle Distributing
- Release date: August 20, 1917
- Running time: 5 reels
- Country: United States
- Language: Silent (English intertitles)

Wooden Shoes is a 1917 American silent drama film directed by Raymond B. West and starring Bessie Barriscale, Jack Livingston, and Joseph J. Dowling.

== Cast ==
- Bessie Barriscale as Pampy
- Jack Livingston as Donald Luther
- Joseph J. Dowling as Captain Hendrik von der Bloom
- Tom Guise as Rufus Smith
- Howard Hickman as Jack Smith
- Margaret Thompson as Gertrude Van Hoosen
- Don Likes as Fat Boy
- Will H. Bray as Dr. Blaisdell
- J. Frank Burke as Father Nepomuk
- Gertrude Claire as The Mevrouw
- J. H. Gotch as Jacob Hauptmann

== Production ==
Village scenes were filmed on the lot of Triangle Studio in Culver City, California. The village set was later used for In Slumberland (1917) and the Bessie Love film Wee Lady Betty (1917).

== Preservation ==
With no prints of Wooden Shoes located in any film archives, it is considered a lost film. In February 2021, the film was cited by the National Film Preservation Board on their Lost U.S. Silent Feature Films list.
