= Somewhere in France =

1916 war drama film directed by Charles Giblyn

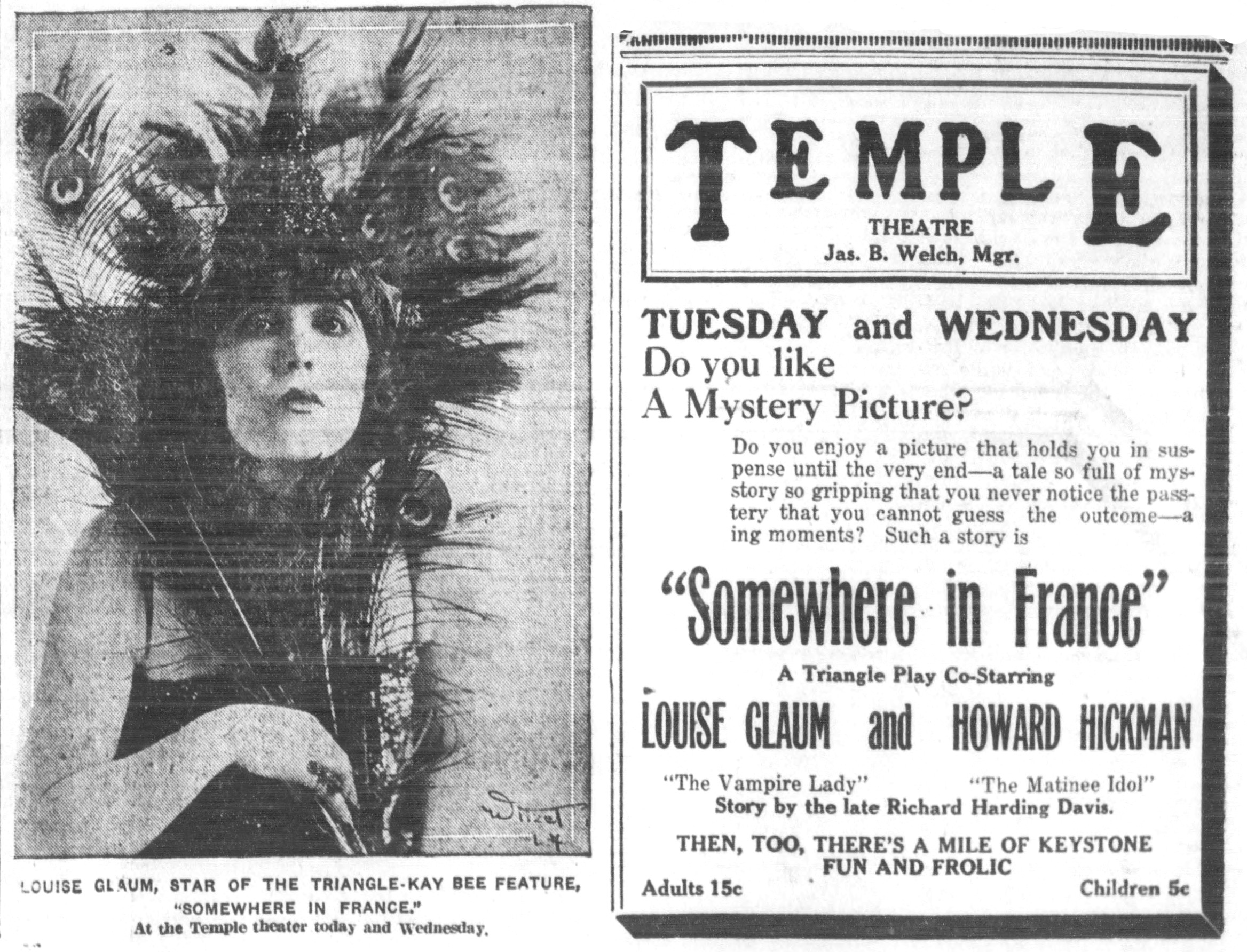
- Newspaper advertisement for the film (right) with a publicity photo for Louise Glaum
- Directed by: Charles Giblyn
- Written by: J. G. Hawks
- Produced by: Thomas H. Ince
- Starring: Louise Glaum; Howard C. Hickman
- Cinematography: Dal Clawson
- Distributed by: Triangle Film Corporation
- Release date: October 29, 1916
- Running time: 50 minutes (5-reels)
- Country: United States
- Language: Silent with English intertitles

Somewhere in France is a 1916 silent era war espionage drama motion picture starring Louise Glaum and Howard C. Hickman.

Directed by Charles Giblyn and produced by Thomas H. Ince, the screenplay was adapted by J. G. Hawks based on the 1915 novel of the same title by Richard Harding Davis, which was also serialized in The Saturday Evening Post.

The production companies for Somewhere in France were the New York Motion Picture Company and Kay-Bee Pictures. It was distributed through the Triangle Film Corporation.

Glaum brings her femme fatale persona of a vamp to this feature length war drama.

== Plot ==
An evil French woman, Marie Chaumontel (played by Glaum), is a spy for the Germans during World War I. She vamps and seduces officers of the French high command, accumulating state secrets and then discarding her lovers.

Chaumontel is the mistress of Captain Henry Ravignac (played by Storm). She steals some papers from him and gives them to the Germans, then escapes to Berlin. He is tried and found guilty of neglect. He then commits suicide. His brother, Lieutenant Charles Ravignac (played by Hickman), vows revenge on Chaumontel. Pretending to be a spy, he goes to work for the Germans and becomes her assistant. He poses as a chauffeur of her phony countess.

When he gathers enough evidence against her, he turns the information over to the Allies. Chaumontel is arrested by French authorities for her foul deeds and sent to prison. He is then hailed as a hero for damaging German espionage operations.

== Cast in credits order ==
- Louise Glaum as Marie Chaumontel
- Howard C. Hickman as Lt. Charles Ravignac
- Joseph J. Dowling as Gen. Andres
- Fanny Midgley as Madame Benet
- Jerome Storm as Capt. Henry Ravignac
- George Fisher as Herr Vogel
- William Fairbanks as Capt. Pierre Thierry
