= Raymond B. West =

American film director (1886–1923)

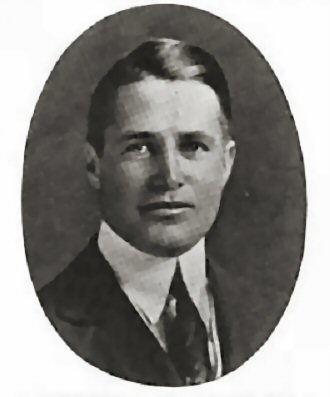
- Who's Who in the Film World, 1914
- Born: February 11, 1886; Chicago, Illinois, US
- Died: September 11, 1923 (aged 37); West Hollywood, California, US
- Occupation: Director
- Years active: 1910–1919

Raymond B. West (February 11, 1886 – September 11, 1923) was an American motion picture director. He joined the New York Motion Picture Company in 1910 and directed more than 70 motion pictures between 1910 and 1919 before being involved in an equestrian accident on set that resulted in permanent physical and psychological damage, forcing his retirement. He died in 1923 at age 37 from complications arising from his prior accident.

== Biography ==
West was born in Chicago, Illinois, in 1886 and attended De La Salle College there. He moved to Los Angeles in 1910 and began working as a motion picture director for Thomas H. Ince at the New York Motion Picture Company, the second motion picture studio to begin operating in Southern California. Between 1910 and 1919, West directed 70 motion pictures. In 1914 alone, West directed 28 motion pictures.

West's first important motion picture was The Alien based on George Beban's play The Sign of the Rose. His most significant films include The Wolf Woman and Civilization. During his ten-year career as a director, he worked with some of the biggest movie stars of the 1910s, including Bessie Barriscale, Charles Ray, William Desmond, Dorothy Dalton and Louise Glaum. He also directed the first film starring Alice Thomas.

West was known as an expert camera man as well as a director. Many of the lighting effects that became common in the 1920s were originated, according to the Los Angeles Times, in West's "ever-active and inventive mind." In 1917, West was also credited with developing a new standard of double exposure photography while directing in The Snarl, a motion picture in which Bessie Barriscale played two parts—sisters competing for the same man.

West reportedly loved film-making "so intensely that he hardly took time to eat or sleep." He suffered a nervous breakdown in or about 1919 that ended his career as a director. He never recovered and never directed another motion picture.

He died on September 11, 1923, at his home on Horne Avenue in West Hollywood, California. West was survived by his wife and a son, Vincent West. His funeral was held at St. Victor's Church, and he was interred at Calvary Cemetery.

== Filmography ==
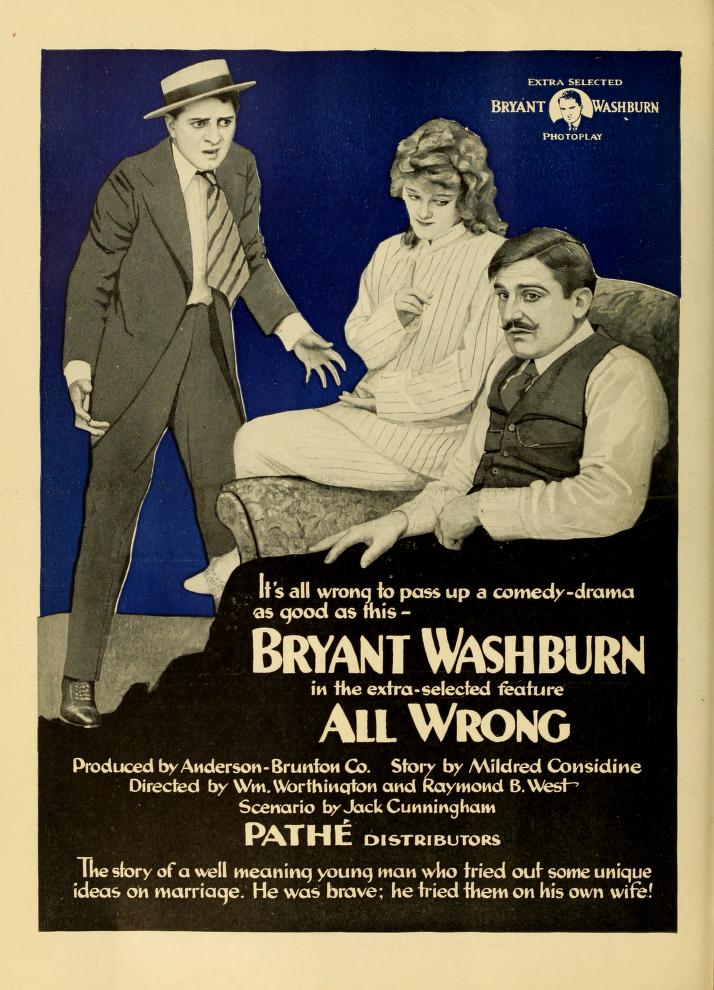
All Wrong, 1919

=== 1913 ===
- The Flame in the Ashes (1913) (actor)
- The Great Sacrifice (1913) (director)
- The Iconoclast (1913) (director)
- The Banshee (1913) (director)
- Flotsam (1913) (director)
- The Quakeress (1913) (director)
- The Waif (1913) (director)
- A Highland Romance (1913) (director)
- The Black Sheep (1913) (director)
- The Heart of Kathleen (1913) (director)
- Widow Maloney's Faith (1913) (director)
- The Ghost (1913) (director)
- The Witch of Salem (1913) (director)
- The Filly (1913) (director)
- Eileen of Erin (1913) (director)

=== 1914 ===
- Shorty Falls Into a Title (1914)
- Eric the Red's Wooing (1914) (director)
- The Golden Goose (1914) (director)
- The Right to Die (1914) (director)
- The Silver Bell (1914) (director)
- The Defaulter (1914) (director)
- A Romance of the Sawdust Ring (1914) (director)
- The City (1914) (director)
- The Heart of a Crook (1914) (director)
- The Latent Spark (1914) (director)
- In the Cow Country (1914) (director)
- The Substitute (1914) (director)
- The Rightful Heir (1914) (director)
- The Geisha (1914) (director)
- The Squire's Son (1914) (director)
- The Bells of Austi (1914) (director)
- A Barrier Royal (1914) (director)
- The Path of Genius (1914) (director)
- For the Wearing of the Green (1914) (director)
- Mario (1914) (director)
- Divorce (1914) (director)
- The Informer (1914) (director)
- The Circle of Fate (1914) (director)
- The Cure (1914) (director)
- The Wrath of the Gods (1914) (special effects director)
- Harp of Tara (1914) (director)
- The House of Bondage (1914) (director)
- True Irish Hearts (1914) (director)

=== 1915 ===
- The Alien (1915) (assistant director)
- Mother Hulda (1915) (director)
- The Girl Who Might Have Been (1915) (director)
- The Riddle of the Wooden Leg (1915) (director)
- The Cup of Life (1915) (director)
- Rumpelstiltskin, (1915) (director)
- The Mating (1915) (director)

=== 1916 ===
- The Moral Fabric (1916) (director)
- Civilization (1916) (director)
- The Payment (1916) (director)
- Home (1916) (director)
- The Lady from the Sea (1916) (director)
- The Wolf Woman (1916) (director)
- The Honorable Algy (1916) (director)
- The Female of the Species (1916), also known as The Vampire (director)

=== 1917 ===
- The Weaker Sex (1917) (director)
- Chicken Casey (1917), also known as Waifs (director)
- The Snarl (1917) (director)
- Whither Thou Goest (1917) (director)
- Madcap Madge (1917) (director)
- Borrowed Plumage (1917) (director)
- Wooden Shoes (1917) (director)
- Ten of Diamonds (1917) (director)
- Those Who Pay (1917) (director)

=== 1918 ===
- The Cast-Off (1918) (director)
- Within the Cup (1918) (director)
- Blindfolded (1918) (director)
- Patriotism (1918) (director)
- Maid o' the Storm (1918) (director)

=== 1919 ===
- All Wrong (1919) (director)
