= Sweetheart of the Doomed =

1917 film directed by Reginald Barker

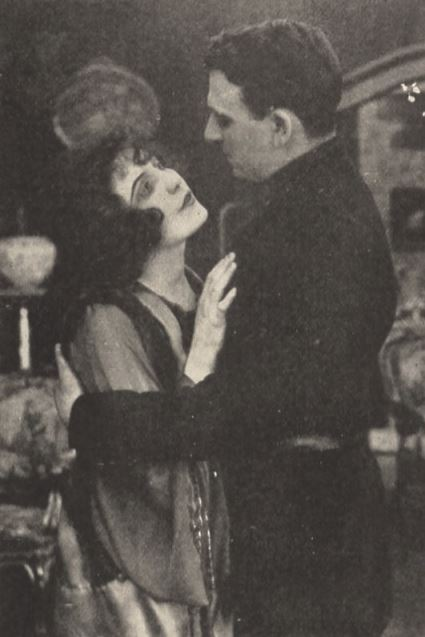
- Still with Glaum and Gunn
- Directed by: Reginald Barker
- Written by: Monte M. Katterjohn; Jerome N. Wilson
- Produced by: Thomas H. Ince
- Starring: Louise Glaum; Charles Gunn; Tom Guise
- Cinematography: Robert Newhard
- Production companies: Kay-Bee Pictures; New York Motion Picture
- Distributed by: Triangle Distributing
- Release date: April 8, 1917
- Running time: 50 minutes
- Country: United States
- Language: Silent (English intertitles)

Sweetheart of the Doomed is a 1917 American silent war drama film directed by Reginald Barker and starring Louise Glaum, Charles Gunn, and Tom Guise. The film's sets were designed by the art director Robert Brunton.

== Cast ==
- Louise Glaum as Honore Zonlay
- Charles Gunn as Paul Montaigne
- Tom Guise as Gen. Gabriel Durand
- Roy Laidlaw as Gen. Jacques du Fresne

== Bibliography ==
- Codori, Jeff. Film History Through Trade Journal Art, 1916-1920. McFarland, 2020.
