= Aloha Oe (film) =

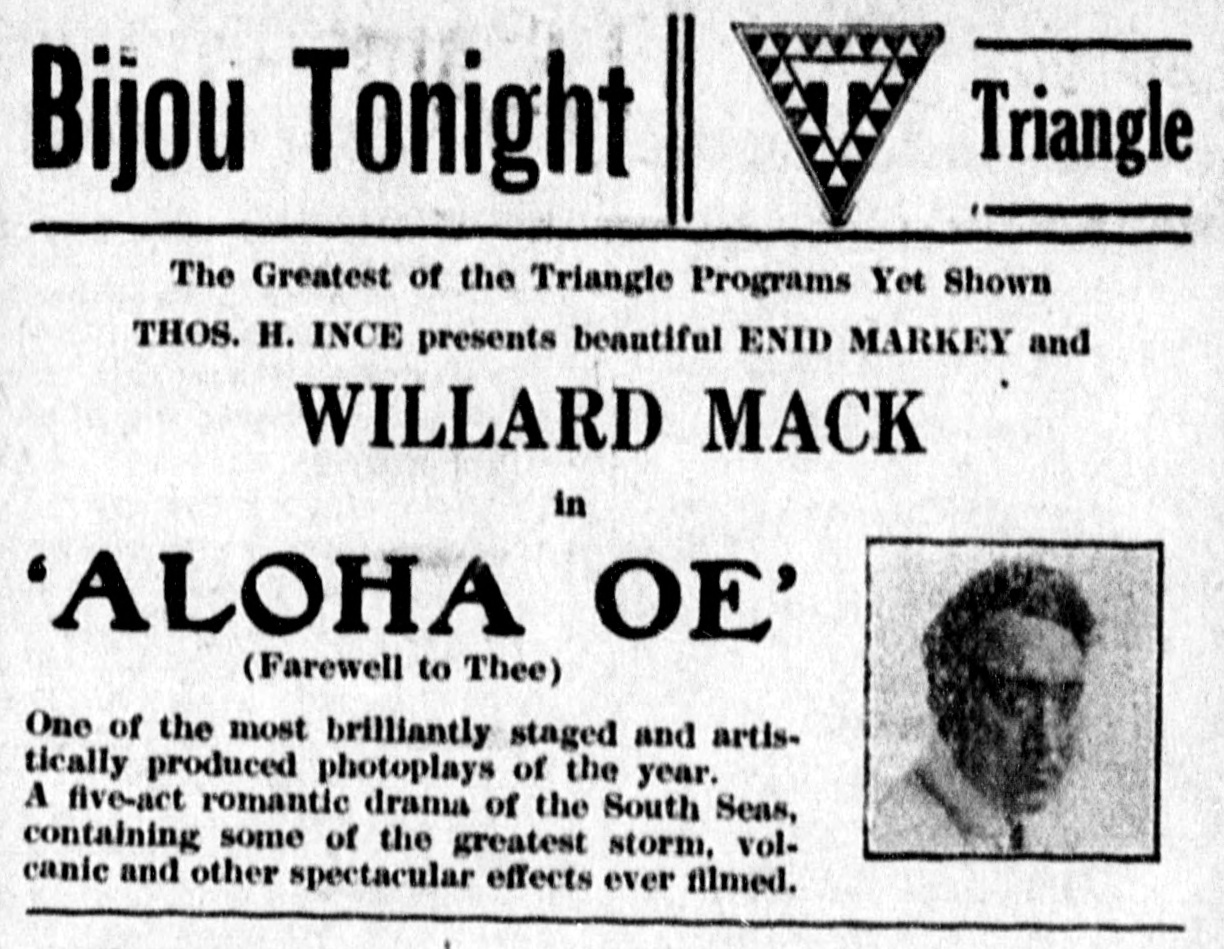
- Newspaper advertisement.
- Directed by: Richard Stanton; Charles Swickard; Gilbert P. Hamilton
- Written by: J.G. Hawks; Thomas Ince (scenario)
- Produced by: Thomas H. Ince
- Starring: Willard Mack; Enid Markey
- Music by: J. E. Nurnberger
- Distributed by: Triangle Film Corporation
- Release date: November 10, 1915
- Running time: 5 reels (4,862)
- Country: United States
- Language: Silent film (English intertitles)

Aloha Oe is a lost 1915 American silent drama film produced by Thomas Ince and released by the Triangle Film Corporation. The script was reused in the 1931 film Aloha.

== Cast ==
- Willard Mack - David Harmon
- Enid Markey - Kalaniweo
- Margaret Thompson - Doris Keith
- Frank Borzage - Dr. John Hawley
- J. Frank Burke - Chief of Kiloliana
- J. Barney Sherry - Mr. Keith - Doris's Father

== Preservation ==
With no holdings located in archives, Aloha Oe is considered a lost film.
