= Blood Will Tell (1917 film) =

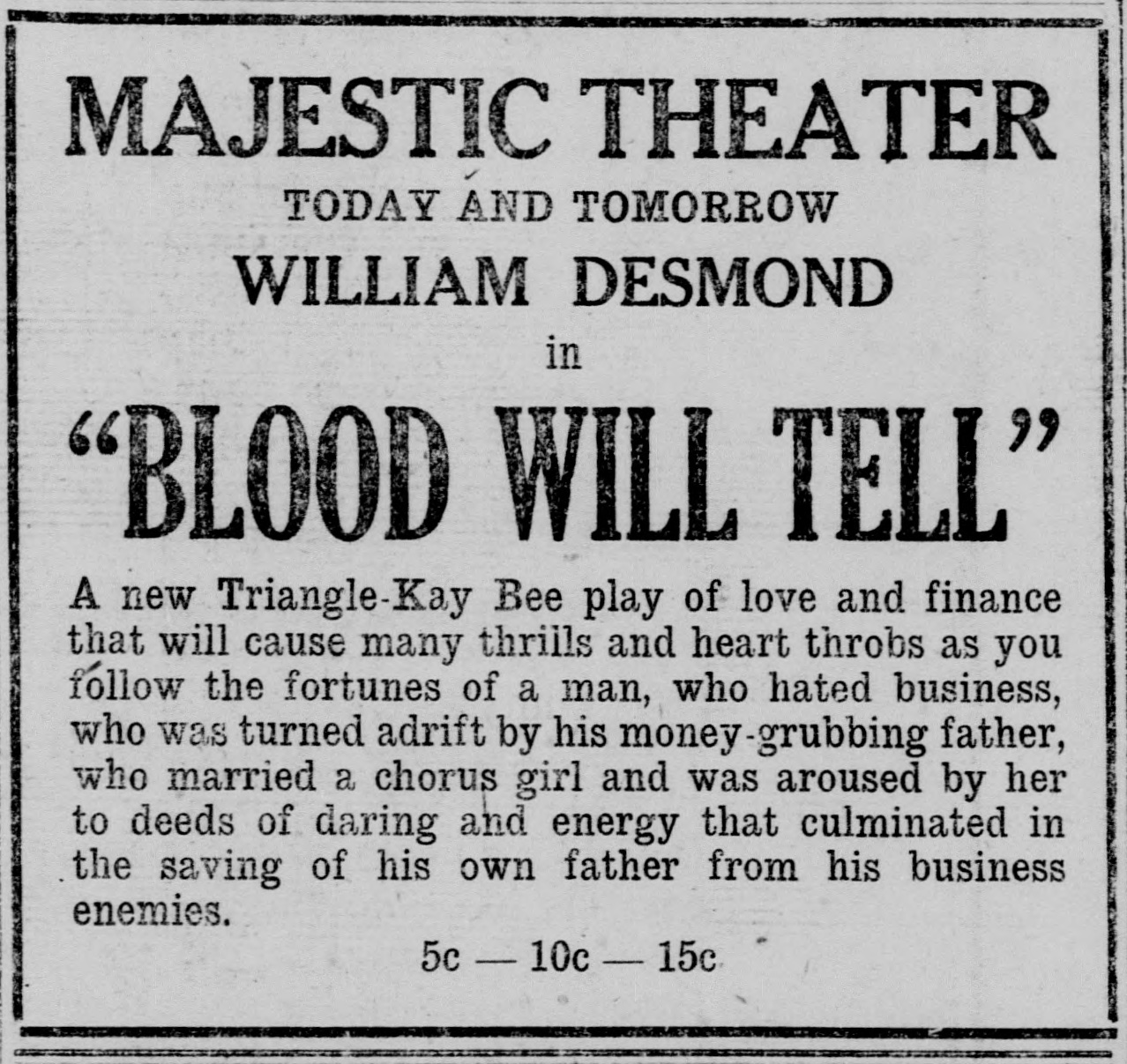
- Contemporary advertisement
- Directed by: Charles Miller
- Written by: J.G. Hawks; John Lynch
- Produced by: Thomas H. Ince
- Starring: William Desmond; Enid Markey; David Hartford
- Cinematography: Clyde De Vinna
- Production companies: Kay-Bee Pictures; New York Motion Picture
- Distributed by: Triangle Distributing
- Release date: March 18, 1917
- Running time: 50 minutes
- Country: United States
- Languages: Silent; English intertitles

Blood Will Tell is a 1917 American silent drama film directed by Charles Miller and starring William Desmond, Enid Markey and David Hartford. The film's sets were designed by the art director Robert Brunton.

== Cast ==
- William Desmond as Samson Oakley III
- Enid Markey as Nora North
- David Hartford as Samson Oakley II
- Howard Hickman as James Black
- Margaret Thompson as Dixie Du Fresne
- Charles Gunn as Otis Slade
- J. Frank Burke as Aaron Howlett
- J. Barney Sherry as Dr. Galbraith
- Fanny Midgley as Mrs. Oakley

== Bibliography ==
- Robert B. Connelly. The Silents: Silent Feature Films, 1910-36, Volume 40, Issue 2. December Press, 1998.
