= Love or Justice =

1917 film

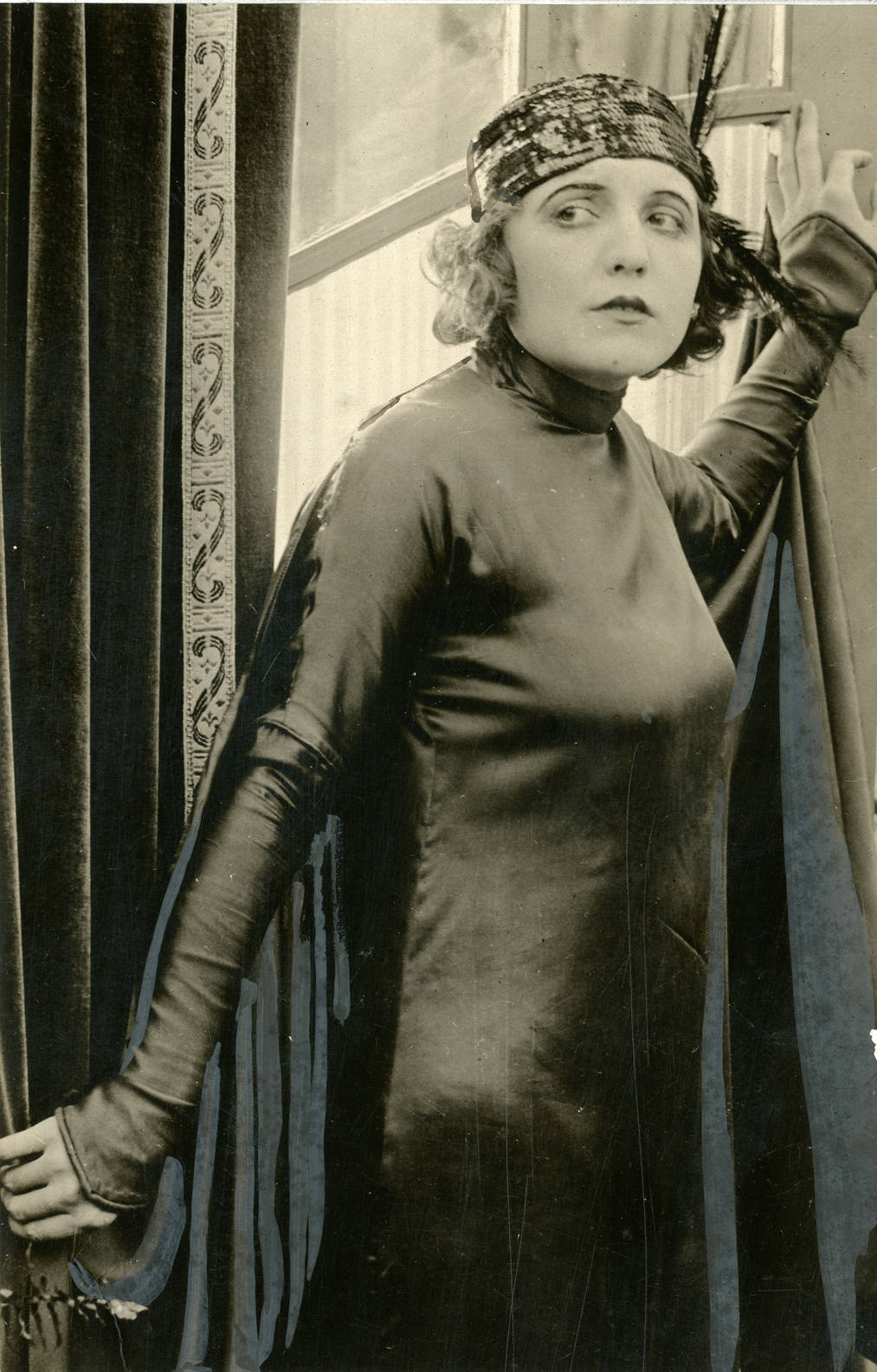
- Still with Gluam
- Directed by: Walter Edwards
- Written by: Lambert Hillyer
- Produced by: Thomas H. Ince
- Starring: Louise Glaum; Charles Gunn; Jack Richardson
- Cinematography: Chester A. Lyons
- Production companies: Kay-Bee Pictures; New York Motion Picture
- Distributed by: Triangle Distributing
- Release date: June 10, 1917
- Running time: 50 minutes
- Country: United States
- Language: Silent (English intertitles)

Love or Justice is a 1917 American silent crime drama film directed by Walter Edwards and starring Louise Glaum, Charles Gunn, and Jack Richardson.

== Cast ==
- Louise Glaum as Nan Bishop
- Charles Gunn as Jack Dunn
- Jack Richardson as Paul Keeley
- J. Barney Sherry as Winthrop E. Haines
- Dorcas Matthews as Phyllis Geary
- Charles K. French as Judge Geary
- Louis Durham as Lieutenant Dillon
- John Gilbert as Benny (credited as Jack Gilbert)

== Bibliography ==
- Langman, Larry. American Film Cycles: The Silent Era. Greenwood Publishing, 1998.
