= J. Barney Sherry =

American actor (1874–1944)

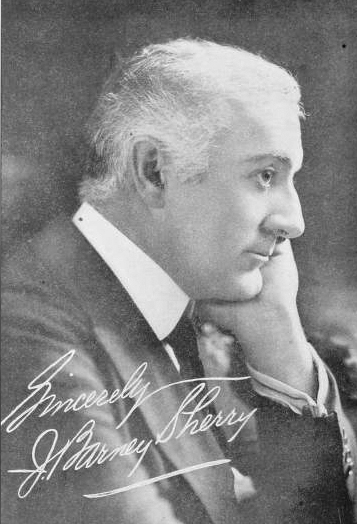
- Sherry, c. 1915
- Born: J. Barney Sherry Reeves; March 4, 1874; Germantown, Pennsylvania, US
- Died: February 22, 1944 (aged 69); Philadelphia, Pennsylvania, US
- Years active: 1905–1929

J. Barney Sherry Reeves (March 4, 1874 – February 22, 1944) was an American actor of the silent film era. He was "one of the first legitimate dramatic actors to desert the stage for the screen".

== Early years ==
Sherry was born J. Barney Sherry Reeves in Germantown, Pennsylvania.

== Career ==
Sherry began acting on stage in the late 1800s. In 1909 he moved to California to begin working in films. He appeared in more than 210 films between 1905 and 1929.

Sherry was also a headliner in vaudeville. He left that medium, going to New York, where a screen test led to a new career in films.

== Later years ==
After Sherry retired he lived in the Philadelphia area, first with relatives and later at the Edwin Forrest Home for actors and actresses. He was heard on radio as part of a promotional campaign for a United Charities drive.

== Death ==
Sherry died on February 22, 1944, in Fitzgerald-Mercy Hospital in Philadelphia, Pennsylvania from cardiovascular disease, aged 72.

== Selected filmography ==
- War on the Plains (1912)
- Custer's Last Fight (1912)
- The Paymaster's Son (1913)
- The Battle of Gettysburg (1913)
- The Bargain (1914)
- The Beckoning Flame (1915)
- The Devil (1915)
- Aloha Oe (1915)
- The Green Swamp (1916)
- The Raiders (1916)
- The Stepping Stone (1916)
- The Millionaire Vagrant (1917)
- The Weaker Sex (1917)
- Madcap Madge (1917)
- Fanatics (1917)
- The Snarl (1917)
- The Iced Bullet (1917)
- The Fuel of Life (1917)
- The Gown of Destiny (1917)
- Love or Justice (1917)
- Blood Will Tell (1917)
- Borrowed Plumage (1917)
- The Stainless Barrier (1917)
- Ten of Diamonds (1917)
- Flying Colors (1917)
- Her Decision (1918)
- The Reckoning Day (1918)
- The Master Man (1919)
- Yvonne from Paris (1919)
- Restless Souls (1919)
- The Secret Code (1918)
- A Man's Fight (1919)
- A Gun Fightin' Gentleman (1919)
- The Lion Man (1919)
- The Black Gate (1919)
- The Mayor of Filbert (1919)
- Go and Get It (1920)
- Darling Mine (1920)
- The River's End (1920)
- Dinty (1920)
- The Forged Bride (1920)
- The Barbarian (1920)
- Man, Woman & Marriage (1921)
- Burn 'Em Up Barnes (1921)
- Just Outside the Door (1921)
- The Lotus Eater (1921)
- Back Pay (1922)
- What Fools Men Are (1922)
- Island Wives (1922)
- The Secrets of Paris (1922)
- When the Desert Calls (1922)
- Sure Fire Flint (1922)
- The Inner Man (1922)
- Notoriety (1922)
- A Woman's Woman (1922)
- Shadows of the Sea (1922)
- Till We Meet Again (1922)
- John Smith (1923)
- The White Sister (1923)
- Jacqueline (1923)
- Galloping Hoofs (1924)
- Miami (1924)
- Lend Me Your Husband (1924)
- The Warrens of Virginia (1924)
- Daughters Who Pay (1925)
- Enemies of Youth (1925)
- False Pride (1925)
- The Crackerjack (1925)
- The Live Wire (1925)
- A Little Girl in a Big City (1925)
- Play Ball (1925)
- Broken Homes (1926)
- Casey of the Coast Guard (1926)
- The Brown Derby (1926)
- Prince of Tempters (1926)
- The Crimson Flash (1927)
- Alex the Great (1928)
- The Wright Idea (1928)
- Broadway Scandals (1929)
