= The Ranchero's Revenge =

1913 film

- Directed by: D. W. Griffith
- Starring: Lionel Barrymore
- Cinematography: G. W. Bitzer
- Distributed by: General Film Company
- Release date: June 2, 1913 (U.S.)
- Running time: 17 minutes
- Country: United States
- Language: Silent (English intertitles)

The Ranchero's Revenge is a 1913 American short silent Western film directed by D. W. Griffith.

== Cast ==
- Lionel Barrymore as The Ranchero
- Harry Carey as The Schemer
- Claire McDowell as The Schemer's associate
- Clarence Barr as the Chinese cook
- Viola Barry as at party
- William Courtright as at wedding
- Charles Hill Mailes as at party

== See also ==
- Harry Carey filmography
- D. W. Griffith filmography
- Lionel Barrymore filmography
