= Inside the Lines (1918 film) =

1918 American silent thriller film

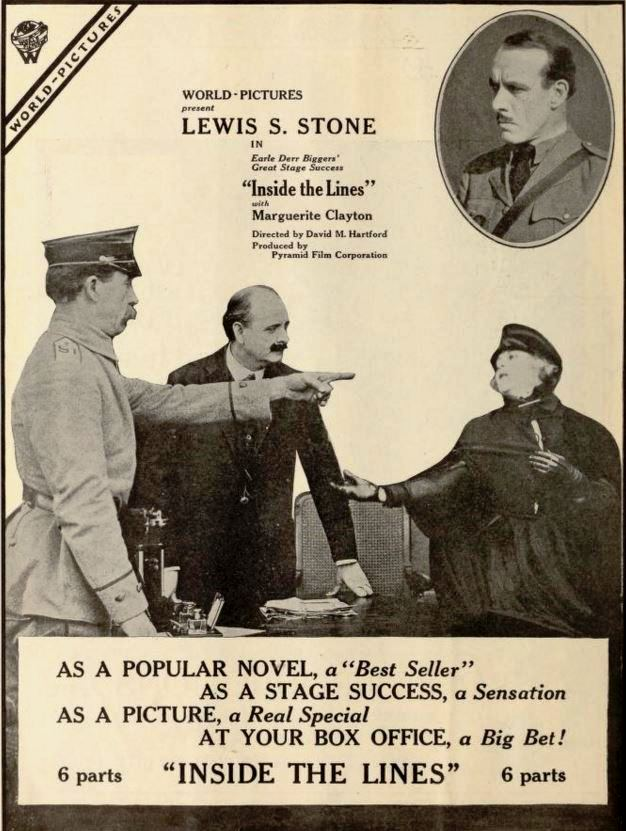
- Directed by: David Hartford
- Written by: Monte M. Katterjohn
- Based on: Inside the Lines; 1915 play by Earl Derr Biggers
- Starring: Lewis Stone; Marguerite Clayton; George Field
- Cinematography: Walter L. Griffin
- Production company: Delcah Photoplays
- Distributed by: World Film
- Release date: August 26, 1918
- Running time: 60 minutes
- Country: United States
- Languages: Silent; English intertitles

Inside the Lines is a 1918 American silent thriller film directed by David Hartford and starring Lewis Stone, Marguerite Clayton and George Field. It was based on a play by Earl Derr Biggers, later remade as a 1930 sound film of the same title.

== Synopsis ==
The Germans order their top spy from Egypt to Gibraltar as part of a plan to destroy the British fleet.

== Cast ==
- Lewis Stone as Captain Cavendish
- Marguerite Clayton as Jane Gerson
- George Field as Da'mihr
- Arthur Allardt as Billy Copper
- David Hartford as Dr. Emil Koch
- Joseph Singleton as Major Gen
- Helen Dunbar as Mrs. Crandall
- Willard Wayne as Captain Woodhouse
- William Durall as Joseph Almer
- Fritz von Hardenberg as Karl Hellinger
- Nick Cogley as Henry Sherman
- Ida Lewis as Mrs. Henry Sherman

== Bibliography ==
- Ken Wlaschin. Silent Mystery and Detective Movies: A Comprehensive Filmography. McFarland, 2009.
