= Alimony (1917 film) =

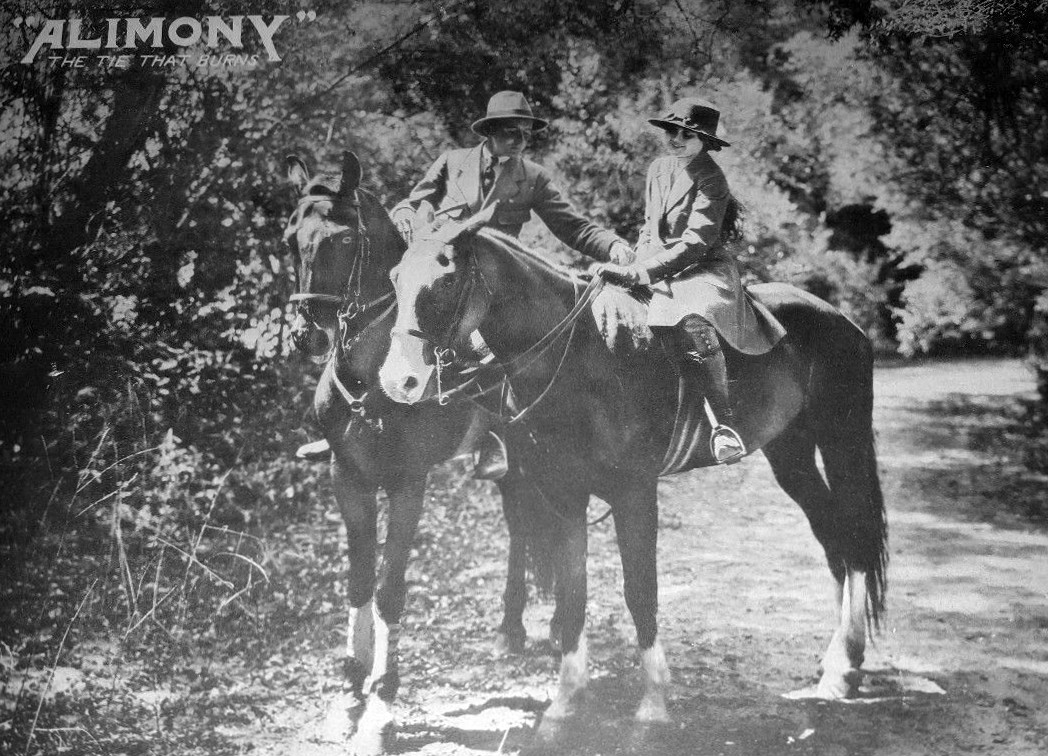
- Lobby card
- Directed by: Emmett J. Flynn
- Written by: Hayden Talbot
- Starring: Lois Wilson
- Cinematography: L. Guy Wilky
- Production company: Paralta Plays
- Distributed by: First National Exhibitors
- Release date: December 3, 1917
- Running time: 6 reels
- Country: United States
- Language: Silent (English intertitles)

Alimony is a lost 1917 American silent drama film directed by Emmett J. Flynn and starring Lois Wilson. An unknown Rudolph Valentino has a role as a supporting player.

== Plot ==
As described in a film magazine, Bernice Bristol Flint, an attractive grass widow (a woman divorced or separated from her husband), associates herself intimately with a number of divorce attorneys who live well on their percentage from unscrupulously secured divorces carrying a large alimony. She is interested in young clubman Howard Turner, who has not remained devoted to her during the period of her latest divorce. She is furious at his waning ardor and considers herself practically jilted as she plots revenge on him. She succeeds in interesting him in Marjorie, a charming guest of hers, and soon brings about a marriage between the couple. Then, with the assistance of unprincipled lawyer Elijah Stone, she separates the pair and begins to frame up a case against which no marital happiness could live. Many misunderstandings occur which make the couple miserable that cannot be explained. They continue to suffer until confederates of the divorcee and attorney turn state's evidence and the guilty man and woman are convicted. The bride and groom, greatly relieved, continue their honeymoon in peace and quiet.

== Cast ==
- Lois Wilson as Marjorie Lansing
- George Fisher as Howard Turner
- Josephine Whittell as Bernice Bristol Flint
- Wallace Worsley as John Flint
- Arthur Allardt as Elijah Stone
- Joseph J. Dowling as William Jackson
- Ida Lewis as Mrs. Lansing
- Margaret Livingston as Florence (credited as Marguerite Livingston)

unbilled

- Alice Terry as Uncredited Extra
- Rudolph Valentino as Dancer

== Reception ==
Like many American films of the time, Alimony was subject to cuts by city and state film censorship boards. For example, the Chicago Board of Censors cut a scene with a girl kicking her feet above the table.

== See also ==
- List of lost films
