= The Raiders (1916 film) =

1916 silent film

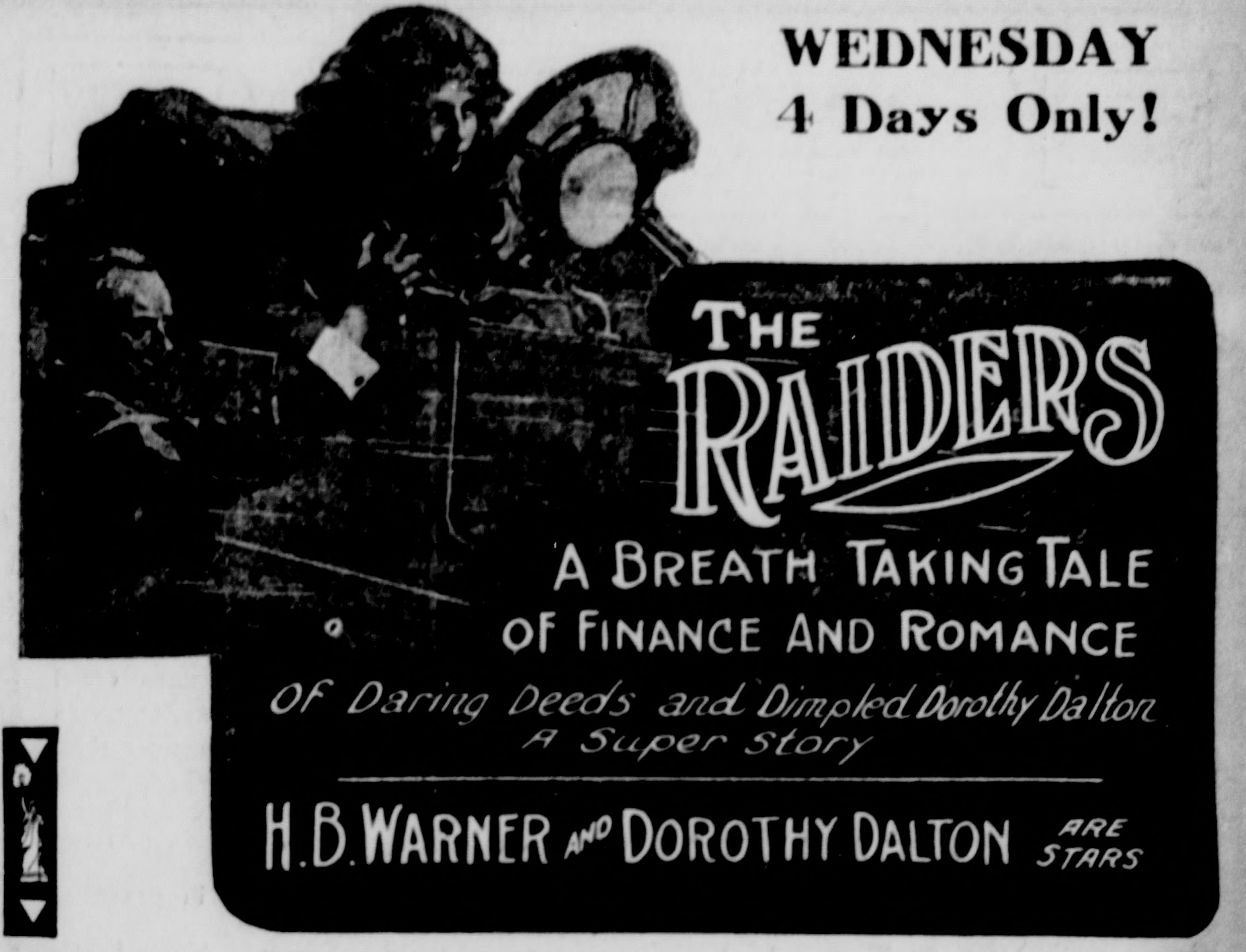
- Contemporary advertisement
- Directed by: Charles Swickard
- Written by: J.G. Hawks
- Produced by: Thomas H. Ince
- Starring: H.B. Warner; Dorothy Dalton; Robert McKim
- Production companies: Kay-Bee Pictures; New York Motion Picture
- Distributed by: Triangle Distributing
- Release date: February 27, 1916
- Running time: 50 minutes
- Country: United States
- Languages: Silent; English intertitles

The Raiders is a 1916 American silent drama film directed by Charles Swickard and starring H.B. Warner, Dorothy Dalton and Robert McKim.

== Cast ==
- H.B. Warner as Scott Wells
- Dorothy Dalton as Dorothy Haldeman
- Henry Belmar as David Haldeman
- Robert McKim as Jerrold Burnes
- George Elwell as Jimmy Callaghan
- J. Barney Sherry as Dr. Hartman

== Preservation ==
An incomplete copy of the film is held by George Eastman House.

== Bibliography ==
- Robert B. Connelly. The Silents: Silent Feature Films, 1910-36, Volume 40, Issue 2. December Press, 1998.
