= Howard Hickman =

American actor (1880–1949)

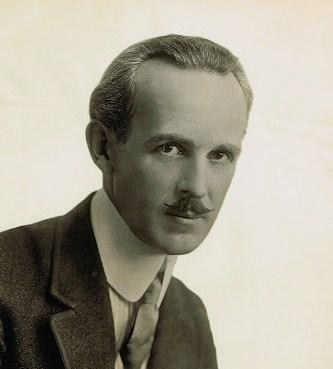
- Hickman in 1916
- Born: Howard Close Hickman; February 9, 1880
- Died: December 31, 1949 (aged 69); San Anselmo, California, U.S.
- Resting place: Mount Tamalpais Cemetery
- Occupations: Actor, director, writer
- Years active: 1912–1944
- Spouse: Bessie Barriscale (m. 1907)
- Children: 1

Howard Close Hickman (February 9, 1880 – December 31, 1949) was an American actor, director and writer. He was an accomplished stage leading man, who entered films through the auspices of producer Thomas H. Ince.

== Early years ==
Hickman was born Howard Close Hickman in Columbia, Missouri. When he was a child he moved to San Jose.

== Career ==
In 1900, Hickman debuted on stage as an extra in a production in San Francisco. He went on to act in repertory theater with the Alcazar Theatre, Morosco, and Melborne MacDowell companies, among others. In 1920 he teamed with his wife to form a vaudeville act for which he wrote the skits in addition to performing. On Broadway, Hickman wrote, and portrayed Gabby in, The Skirt (1921). He left the stage in 1925.

Hickman's initial work in films was with the Lasky Pictures Company, after which he acted with the Triangle Company and later the Ince company.

In 1918, Hickman debuted as a director, with The Rainbow (for Paralta studios) as his first film. He directed 19 films.

With the rise of the sound film, Hickman returned to the film business but received mostly small roles, often as an authoritarian figure. In 1939, Hickman made a brief appearance as plantation owner John Wilkes, father of Ashley Wilkes, in Gone with the Wind. He ended his film career in 1944, after more than 270 films.

== Personal life ==
Hickman was married to actress Bessie Barriscale. He died of a heart attack at his home in San Anselmo on December 31, 1949, six weeks before his 70th birthday and was buried at Mount Tamalpais Cemetery in San Rafael. He had a son.

== Selected filmography ==
=== As actor ===
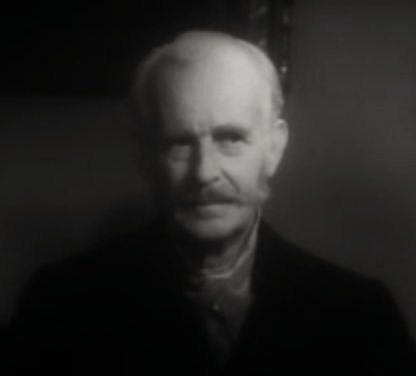
Howard Hickman in Cheers for Miss Bishop (1941)

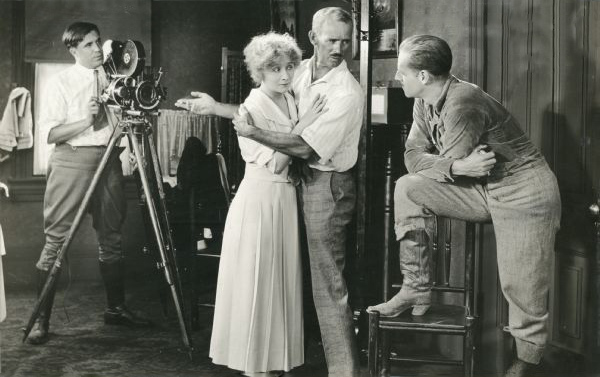
Original caption: "Howard Hickman, husband and director of Bessie Barriscale, shows leading man Jack Holt how to make love to Mrs. Hickman." This appears to be a production still from Kitty Kelly, M.D. (1919). If so, the cameraman behind the Bell & Howell model 2709 is Eugene Gaudio.

- The Circus Man (1914) as Artful Dick Cronk
- The Cup of Life (1915) as Higsby
- The Man from Oregon (1915) as 'Honest' Jim Martin
- Civilization (1915) as Count Ferdinand
- The Picture of Dorian Gray (1915) as Basil Hayward
- The Moral Fabric (1916) as Mackley Stuart
- The Wolf Woman (1916) as John Morton
- The Jungle Child (1916) as Ridgeway Webb
- Somewhere in France (1916) as Lt. Charles Ravignac
- The Honorable Algy (1916) as Lord Rockmore
- The Sin Ye Do (1916) as Robert Darrow
- The Female of the Species (1916) as Carleton Condon
- Chicken Casey (1917) as 'Dickey' Cochran
- Blood Will Tell (1917) as James Black
- The Snarl (1917) as Jack Mason
- Wooden Shoes (1917) as Jack Smith
- Those Who Pay (1917) as George W. Graham
- Madam Who? (1918) as Henry Morgan
- The Cast-Off (1918) as Dr. Jim Thorpe
- Blue Blood (1918) as Spencer Wellington
- Rose o' Paradise (1918) as Lafe Grandoken
- Social Ambition (1918) as Vincent Manton
- Maid o' the Storm (1918) as Jules Picardo
- Alias Jimmy Valentine (1928) as Mr. Lane
- The Broadway Hoofer (1929) as Larry
- His First Command (1929) as Maj. Hall
- Hello Sister (1930) as John Stanley
- Brothers (1930) as John Naughton
- The Age of Consent (1932) as Doctor (uncredited)
- Tess of the Storm Country (1932) as Minister (uncredited)
- The Silk Express (1933) as Mill Owner in Association (uncredited)
- The Man Who Dared (1933) as Politician (uncredited)
- I Loved a Woman (1933) as Businessman at Meeting (uncredited)
- Walls of Gold (1933) as Bridge Player (uncredited)
- The Right to Romance (1933) as Dr. Macey (uncredited)
- The World Changes (1933) as Doctor (uncredited)
- Hello, Sister! (1933)
- The Big Shakedown (1934) as Board Member (uncredited)
- Hi Nellie! (1934) as Dr. John W. Wilson (uncredited)
- Gambling Lady (1934) as Divorce Judge (uncredited)
- Jimmy the Gent (1934) as Doctor (uncredited)
- Mystery Liner (1934) as Dr. Howard
- George White's Scandals (1934) as Doctor (uncredited)
- Three on a Honeymoon (1934) as Mr. Foster (uncredited)
- A Modern Hero (1934) as Dr. McPherson (uncredited)
- Sisters Under the Skin (1934) as Dutton
- Upper World (1934) as Judge (uncredited)
- Twentieth Century (1934) as Dr. Johnson (uncredited)
- The Personality Kid (1934) as Joan's Doctor (uncredited)
- Baby, Take a Bow (1934) as Blair (uncredited)
- Return of the Terror (1934) as Judge
- Side Streets (1934) as Dr. Randolph W. Hendricks (uncredited)
- The Defense Rests (1934) as Judge (uncredited)
- Here Comes the Navy (1934) as Captain
- The Man with Two Faces (1934) as Mr. Jones (uncredited)
- Death on the Diamond (1934) as Dr. Cushman (uncredited)
- A Lost Lady (1934) as Dr. Barlow (uncredited)
- Evelyn Prentice (1934) as Mr. Whitlock - Party Guest (uncredited)
- Gentlemen Are Born (1934) as College President (uncredited)
- The Silver Streak (1934) as Member Board of Directors (uncredited)
- Fugitive Lady (1934) as Doctor (uncredited)
- The Secret Bride (1934) as Senate President (uncredited)
- The Mighty Barnum (1934) as Minor Role (scenes deleted)
- Red Hot Tires (1935) as Judge Alcott
- Carnival (1935) as Doctor (uncredited)
- Law Beyond the Range (1935) as Captain Wood (uncredited)
- Death Flies East (1935) as Carlyle (uncredited)
- Captain Hurricane (1935) as Jimmy's Father (uncredited)
- I'll Love You Always (1935) as Dean (uncredited)
- Straight from the Heart (1935) as Police Sergeant (uncredited)
- West Point of the Air (1935) as Army Officer in Former Times (uncredited)
- Great God Gold (1935) as Dunbar - Marcia's Attorney (uncredited)
- Fighting Shadows (1935) as Inspector Rutledge (uncredited)
- Dinky (1935) as Judge Barlow (uncredited)
- Let 'Em Have It (1935) as Assistant Chief Clerk (uncredited)
- The Flame Within (1935) as Man at Hospital Benefit (uncredited)
- Ginger (1935) as Juvenile Judge (uncredited)
- The Murder Man (1935) as Howard Jennings (uncredited)
- Bright Lights (1935) as Mr. Aldridge (uncredited)
- Woman Wanted (1935) as Dr. Griffith (uncredited)
- Little Big Shot (1935) as The Judge (uncredited)
- I Live My Life (1935) as Teacher at Terry's Lecture (uncredited)
- It's in the Air (1935) as Mr. Ruby
- Three Kids and a Queen (1935) as Dr. Bowers (uncredited)
- Rendezvous (1935) as G-Man
- Whipsaw (1935) as Hotel Clerk (uncredited)
- Too Tough to Kill (1935) as Billings (uncredited)
- Two Against the World (1936) as Dr. Maguire
- Hell-Ship Morgan (1936) as Cabot
- Dangerous Waters (1936) as Ship Doctor (uncredited)
- The Bohemian Girl (1936) as Dignified Captain (uncredited)
- August Week End (1936) as Spencer
- Too Many Parents (1936) as Colonel Colman
- The Law in Her Hands (1936) as Judge Henry D. Morse (uncredited)
- Fury (1936) as Governor
- Parole! (1936) as Lawyer (uncredited)
- Trapped by Television (1936) as G.P. Tucker - Board Member (uncredited)
- To Mary - with Love (1936) as Guest #7
- Swing Time (1936) as First Minister (uncredited)
- Murder with Pictures (1936) as Judge (uncredited)
- Libeled Lady (1936) as Cable Editor (uncredited)
- 15 Maiden Lane (1936) as Mr. Whitman - Jeweller (uncredited)
- Wild Brian Kent (1936) as Bob Cruikshank
- Love Letters of a Star (1936) as Dr. Webster
- Pennies from Heaven (1936) as Chaplain (uncredited)
- Crack-Up (1936) as Major White
- Happy Go Lucky (1936) as Dr. Wilson
- Career Woman (1936) as Judge Whitman
- We Who Are About to Die (1937) as Prison Chaplain
- Join the Marines (1937) as Pruitt
- Outcast (1937) as Dr. Matthews (uncredited)
- The Great Barrier (1937) as Donald Smith - Member of C.P.R. Board
- The Crime Nobody Saw (1937) as Robert Mallory
- Maytime (1937) as Opera Director (uncredited)
- Jim Hanvey, Detective (1937) as Herbert Frost
- Motor Madness (1937) as Dr. Cadman (uncredited)
- Criminals of the Air (1937) as Harrison (uncredited)
- Venus Makes Trouble (1937) as Howard Clark
- Charlie Chan at the Olympics (1937) as Dr. Burton
- Married Before Breakfast (1937) as Arthur - Man Bringing in Two Hoboes (uncredited)
- Roaring Timber (1937) as Banker (uncredited)
- The Lady Escapes (1937) as Judge
- Artists and Models (1937) as Mr. Currie (uncredited)
- One Mile from Heaven (1937) as Judge Clarke
- Western Gold (1937) as Jim Thatcher
- The Man Who Cried Wolf (1937) as Doctor on Stage (uncredited)
- One Hundred Men and a Girl (1937) as Johnson
- Back in Circulation (1937) as Judge (uncredited)
- Roll Along, Cowboy (1937) as Dr. Cooper (uncredited)
- Murder in Greenwich Village (1937) as Mr. Sloan (uncredited)
- Checkers (1937) as Race Judge (uncredited)
- Borrowing Trouble (1937) as Judge Walters
- Tarzan's Revenge (1938) as Mr. Johnson (uncredited)
- Love Is a Headache (1938) as Editor Williams (uncredited)
- My Old Kentucky Home (1938) (uncredited)
- Start Cheering (1938) as Dr. Fosdick
- King of the Newsboys (1938) as Judge (uncredited)
- Flight into Nowhere (1938) as Howard Hammond
- Rascals (1938) as Judge
- Numbered Woman (1938)
- Holiday (1938) as Churchgoer (uncredited)
- The Rage of Paris (1938) as Man in Opera Box (uncredited)
- Woman Against Woman (1938) as Mr. Jamison (uncredited)
- Panamint's Bad Man (1938) as Marshal Winston (uncredited)
- Smashing the Rackets (1938) as James J. Carew (uncredited)
- Come On, Leathernecks! (1938) as Captain Felton
- Juvenile Court (1938) as Governor Stanley
- Young Dr. Kildare (1938) as Dr. Harris (uncredited)
- I Stand Accused (1938) as Gilbert
- Next Time I Marry (1938) as Judge Jonathan Travers (uncredited)
- Kentucky (1938) as Banker (uncredited)
- Convict's Code (1939) as Prison Warden
- Off the Record (1939) as Doctor (uncredited)
- Wings of the Navy (1939) as Capt. Dreen (uncredited)
- Wife, Husband and Friend (1939) as Concert Manager
- Three Smart Girls Grow Up (1939) as Conference Room Businessman (uncredited)
- Everybody's Baby (1939) as Dr. Jenkins
- Trouble in Sundown (1939) as John Cameron
- The Kid from Texas (1939) as Doctor at Polo Grounds (uncredited)
- Good Girls Go to Paris (1939) as Jeffers - Brand's Butler
- On Borrowed Time (1939) as Chief Surgeon (uncredited)
- When Tomorrow Comes (1939) as Wealthy Man (uncredited)
- The Under-Pup (1939) as Business Man (uncredited)
- The Angels Wash Their Faces (1939) as Judge Wilson (uncredited)
- Full Confession (1939) as Third Doctor (uncredited)
- Thunder Afloat (1939) as Surgeon (uncredited)
- Espionage Agent (1939) as Walter Forbes
- The Kansas Terrors (1939) as Governor-General del Montez
- Beware Spooks! (1939) as Judge Roth (uncredited)
- Little Accident (1939) as Mr. Allerton
- The Return of Doctor X (1939) as Chairman (scenes deleted)
- Gone with the Wind (1939) as John Wilkes
- Slightly Honorable (1939) as Sen. Sam Scott
- My Son Is Guilty (1939) as Commissioner George Dodge (uncredited)
- The Man from Dakota (1940) as Confederate Colonel (uncredited)
- Castle on the Hudson (1940) as The Judge (uncredited)
- Virginia City (1940) as Confederate Gen. Page (uncredited)
- Dark Command (1940) as Southerner Orating for Votes (uncredited)
- It All Came True (1940) as Mr. Prendergast
- Bullet Code (1940) as John Mathews
- Gangs of Chicago (1940) as Judge Whitaker
- Island of Doomed Men (1940) as Judge (uncredited)
- Girls of the Road (1940) as Gov. Warren
- They Drive by Night (1940) as The Judge (uncredited)
- The Secret Seven (1940) as Dr. Talbot
- Boom Town (1940) as McCreery's Associate #1 (uncredited)
- Yesterday's Heroes (1940) as Trustee (uncredited)
- Spring Parade (1940) as Colonel (uncredited)
- Strike Up the Band (1940) as Doctor
- Little Men (1940) as Doctor (uncredited)
- Bowery Boy (1940) as Dr. Axel Winters
- Four Mothers (1941) as Music Foundation Director (uncredited)
- Maisie Was a Lady (1941) as Dr. Stephen W. Fredericks (uncredited)
- Cheers for Miss Bishop (1941) as Professor Lancaster
- Robin Hood of the Pecos (1941) as Colonel Davis (uncredited)
- Back Street (1941) as Mr. Williams (uncredited)
- Golden Hoofs (1941) as Calvin Harmon
- Robbers of the Range (1941) as Roy Tremaine
- Washington Melodrama (1941) as Bishop Chatterton
- Lady from Louisiana (1941) as Judge William Harding (uncredited)
- Scattergood Pulls the Strings (1941) as Withers
- Angels with Broken Wings (1941) (uncredited)
- Blossoms in the Dust (1941) as Texas Senator (uncredited)
- Hurricane Smith (1941) as Sen. Bradley
- Hold That Ghost (1941) as Judge (uncredited)
- Dive Bomber (1941) as Admiral (uncredited)
- Ice-Capades (1941) as Lawyer (uncredited)
- Belle Starr (1941) as Colonel Thornton
- Nine Lives Are Not Enough (1941) as Colonel Andrews
- Doctors Don't Tell (1941) as Dr. Watkins
- You Belong to Me (1941) as Mr. Deker (uncredited)
- Tuxedo Junction (1941) as Judge Leo Rivers
- Paris Calling (1941) as French General (uncredited)
- Dick Tracy vs. Crime Inc. (1941) as Stephen Chandler
- Uncle Joe (1941) as Banker Jones
- Lady for a Night (1942) as Civil War General (uncredited)
- The Vanishing Virginian (1942) as Dr. Edwards (uncredited)
- Born to Sing (1942) as Critic (uncredited)
- The Male Animal (1942) as Faculty Member (uncredited)
- True to the Army (1942) as Brigadier General (uncredited)
- I Was Framed (1942) as Stuart Gaines
- Kid Glove Killer (1942) as Clemence - First Politician (uncredited)
- Tarzan's New York Adventure (1942) as Blake Norton
- Bells of Capistrano (1942) as Doctor (uncredited)
- Tish (1942) as Mr. Fielding Kelbridge (uncredited)
- Andy Hardy's Double Life (1942) as Lincoln Lumber's Attorney (uncredited)
- Three Hearts for Julia (1943) as Mr. Doran (uncredited)
- The Masked Marvel (1943) as Warren Hamilton
- Watch on the Rhine (1943) as Cyrus Penfield (uncredited)
- Captain America (1944, Serial) as Lyman's Attorney [Ch. 4] (uncredited)
- Casanova in Burlesque (1944) as Dean Wyatt (uncredited)
- The Heavenly Body (1944) as Scientist (uncredited)
- Her Primitive Man (1944) as Bilson (uncredited)
- Follow the Boys (1944) as Dr. Wood (uncredited)
- Gypsy Wildcat (1944) (uncredited)
- National Barn Dance (1944) as Mr. Hollander (uncredited)
- The Last Ride (1944) as Mr. Bronson (uncredited)
- Mrs. Parkington (1944) as Dr. Herrick (uncredited)
- Bowery to Broadway (1944) as Showman (uncredited) (final film role)

=== As director ===
- His Mother's Portrait (1915)
- When Love Leads (1915)
- The White Lie (1918)
- The Heart of Rachael (1918)
- Two-Gun Betty (1918)
- All of a Sudden Norma (1919)
- A Trick of Fate (1919)
- Hearts Asleep (1919)
- Josselyn's Wife (1919)
- Tangled Threads (1919)
- Her Purchase Price (1919)
- Kitty Kelly, M.D. (1919)
- Beckoning Roads (1919)
- Just a Wife (1920)
- The Killer (1921)
- Nobody's Kid (1921)
- The Lure of Egypt (1921)
- A Certain Rich Man (1921)
- Man of the Forest (1921)

=== As writer ===
- Kitty Kelly, M.D. (1919)
- Nobody's Kid (1921)
