= J. G. Hawks =

American screenwriter (1874–1940)

John Gerald Hawks (1874–1940) was an American screenwriter. He wrote several scripts for Thomas H. Ince's Kay-Bee Pictures. He also wrote the first photoplay featuring Mabel Normand.

One of his scripts was made as a tribute to the deceased jurist Juan J. Carrillo. His career ended with the transition to talking pictures requiring scripted dialogue.

== Filmography ==
- The Quakeress (1913)
- The Geisha (1914)
- Aloha Oe (1915) co-written with Ince
- "Bad Buck" of Santa Ynez (1915)
- D'artagnan (1915)
- House of His Fathers (1915) co-written with Ince
- Raiders (1915) co-written with Ince
- The Three Musketeers (1916)
- The Vagabond Prince (1916)
- The Raiders (1916)
- The Primal Lure (1916), an adaptation of a Vingie E. Roe novel
- Somewhere in France (1916), based on a book
- Chicken Casey (1917)
- Wooden Shoes (1917)
- A Strange Transgressor (1917), from a story
- Paws of the Bear (1917)
- The Firefly of Tough Luck (1917)
- The Bride of Hate (1917)
- The Dark Road (1917)
- The Last of the Ingrams (1917)
- Paddy O'Hara (1917)
- Blood Will Tell (1917)
- Truthful Tulliver (1917)
- Time Locks and Diamonds (1917)
- The Tar Heel Warrior (1917)
- The Millionaire Vagrant (1917)
- Flare-Up Sal (1918)
- Partners Three (1919)
- Under Crimson Skies (1920)
- Love in the Dark (1922)
- The Glorious Fool (1922)
- Hearts Aflame (1923)
- The Sea Hawk (1924)
- The Splendid Road (1925)
- Her Husband's Secret (1925)
- The Price of Pleasure (1925)
- Percy (1925)
- The Combat (1926)
- Breed of the Sea (1926)
- Enemies of Society (1927)
- The Sonora Kid (1927)
- Ladies Beware (1927)
- Shanghaied (1927)
- Freedom of the Press (1928)
- The Michigan Kid (1928)
- Melody Lane (1929)
