= Tom Guise =

American actor (1857–1930)

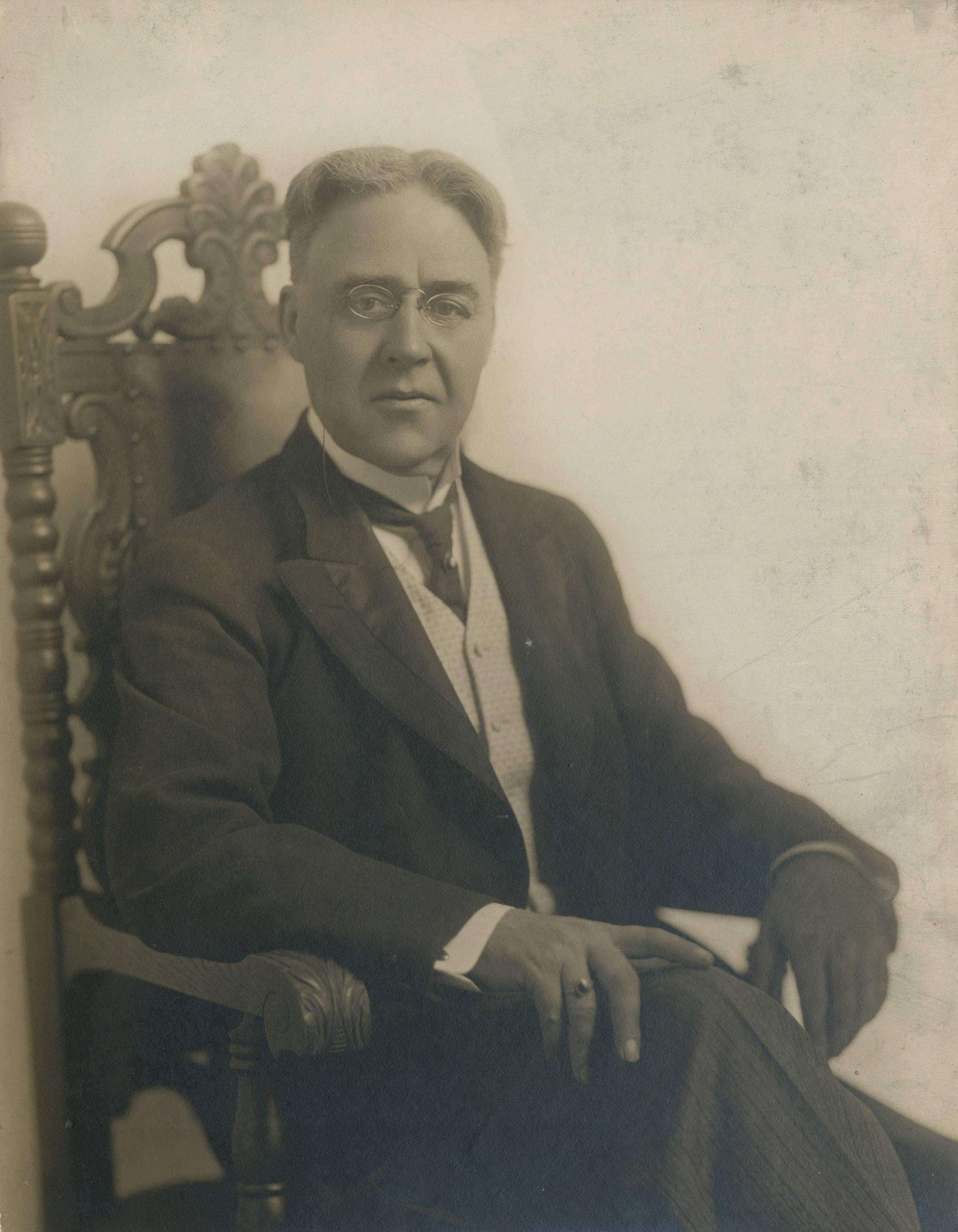
Tom Guise in 1909

Tom Guise (1857–1930) was an American male actor on stage and screen. He appeared in numerous films in the decade spanning 1917 to 1927.

He was one of the popular stars in the film adaptation of the controversial book Black Oxen. His performance in 23 1/2 Hours' Leave was described as clever.

== Partial filmography ==
- Sweetheart of the Doomed (1917) as General Gabriel Durand
- Time Locks and Diamonds (1917) as Howe Seymour
- Fighting Back (1917) as Colonel Hampton
- The Snarl (1917) as Opera Manager
- The Stainless Barrier (1917) as Thomas Crosby
- The Tar Heel Warrior (1917) as Major Amos
- The Fuel of Life (1917) as Goldman
- Indiscreet Corinne (1917) as Mr. Chilvers
- Idolators (1917) as Burr Britton
- The Clodhopper (1917) as Karl Seligman
- The Crab (1917) as 'Doc' Wingate (*as Thomas Guise)
- Chicken Casey (1917) as Israel Harris Connelly
- Wooden Shoes (1917) as Rufus Smith
- Vive la France! (1918) as Colonel Bouchier
- The Man from Funeral Range (1918) as Colonel Leighton
- 23 1/2 Hours' Leave (1919) as General Dodge
- The Love That Dares (1919) as Rutherford
- The Midnight Stage (1919) as Elias Lynch (*Thomas Guise)
- The Woman Michael Married (1919) as Ordsway, Sr.
- Josselyn's Wife (1919) as Thomas Josselyn
- When a Man Loves (1919) as Lord Bannister
- Hearts Asleep (1919) as Andrew Calvert
- Kitty Kelly, M.D. (1919)
- One Hour Before Dawn (1920) as Judge Copeland
- Number 99 (1920) as James Valentine
- The Dream Cheater (1920) as Patrick FitzGeorge
- $30,000 (1920) as Mat Lloyd
- Smoldering Embers (1920) as Congressman Wyatt
- Alarm Clock Andy (1920) as Mr. Wells
- The Passionate Pilgrim (1921) as Senator Watt
- Love Is an Awful Thing (1922) as Judge Griggs
- Wolf Law (1922) as Etienne De Croteau
- Sisters (1922) as Doctor Strickland
- The Strangers' Banquet (1922) as Bride's father
- The Trouper (1922) as Warren Selden (credited as Tom S. Guise)
- Crossed Wires (1923) as Bellamy Benson
- Jazzmania (1923) as General Muroff
- Black Oxen (1923) as Judge Gavin Trent, extant
- Around the World in 18 Days (1923) as Davis
- Crooked Alley (1923) as Judge Milnar
- Held to Answer (1923) as The Judge (as Thomas Guise)
- Stepping Fast (1923) as Quentin Durant
- Garrison's Finish (1923) as Major Desha
- His Forgotten Wife (1924) as Judge Henry
- After the Ball as Mark Trevelyan
- Secrets of the Night (1924) as Colonel James Constance
- The Beautiful Cheat (1926) as Leland Bruckman
- Wedding Bills (1927) as Mr. Markham
- The Claw (1927) as Marquis de Stair
