= The Stainless Barrier =

1917 film

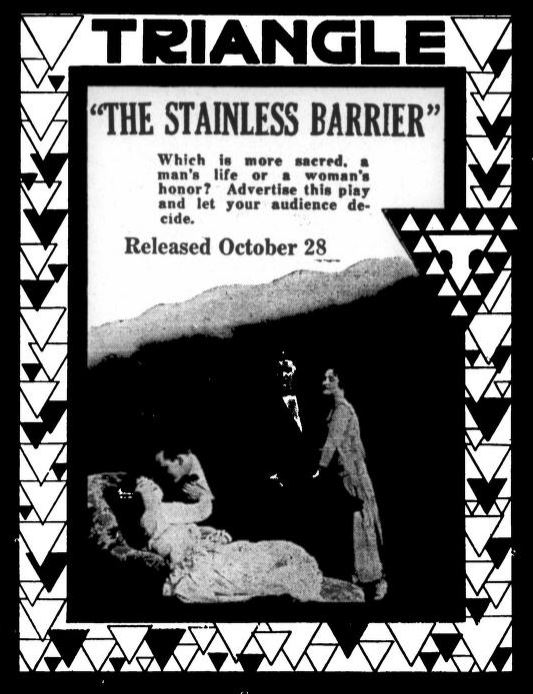
- Directed by: Thomas N. Heffron
- Written by: Jack Cunningham; Louis Schneider
- Starring: Irene Hunt; Jack Livingston; Henry A. Barrows
- Cinematography: R.E. Irish
- Production company: Triangle Film Corporation
- Distributed by: Triangle Distributing
- Release date: October 28, 1917
- Running time: 50 minutes
- Country: United States
- Languages: Silent; English intertitles

The Stainless Barrier is a 1917 American silent drama film directed by Thomas N. Heffron and starring Irene Hunt, Jack Livingston and Henry A. Barrows.

== Cast ==
- Irene Hunt as Betsy Shelton
- Jack Livingston as Calvin Stone
- Henry A. Barrows as Roger Enderleigh
- Rowland V. Lee as Richard Shelton
- Tom Guise as Thomas Crosby
- J. Barney Sherry as Wilbur Gray
- John Lince as Wallace
- Kate Bruce as Aunt Ruth Shelton
- Lena Harris as Mammy
- Jim Farley as Williams

== Bibliography ==
- Lowe, Denise. An Encyclopedic Dictionary of Women in Early American Films: 1895-1930. Routledge, 2014.
