= Maid o' the Storm =

1918 silent film

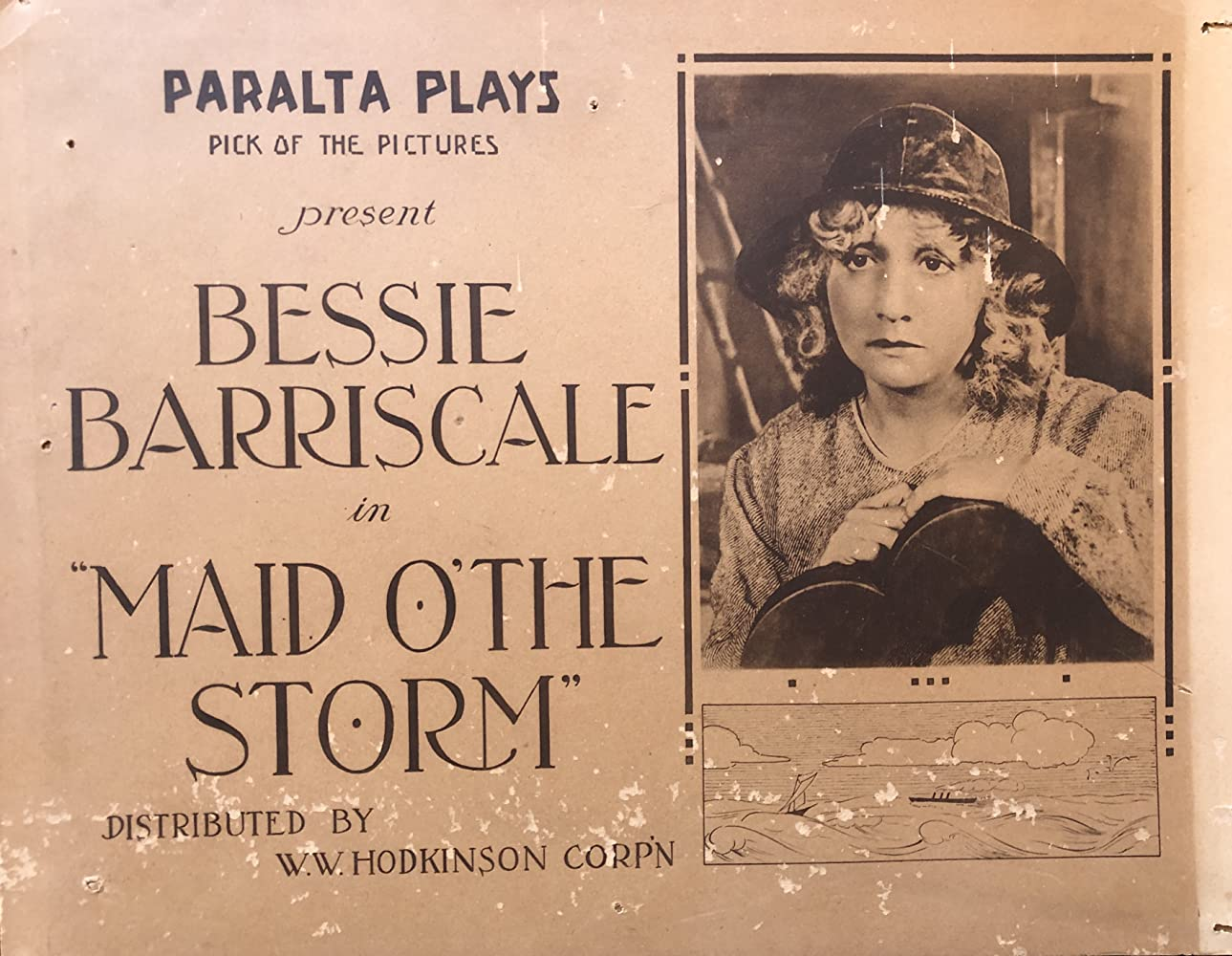
- Directed by: Raymond B. West
- Written by: J. Grubb Alexander; Fred Myton
- Produced by: Robert Brunton
- Starring: Bessie Barriscale; George Fisher; Herschel Mayall
- Cinematography: Clyde De Vinna; L. Guy Wilky
- Production company: Paralta Plays
- Distributed by: Hodkinson Pictures
- Release date: June 27, 1918
- Running time: 60 minutes
- Country: United States
- Languages: Silent; English intertitles

Maid o' the Storm is a 1918 American silent drama film directed by Raymond B. West and starring Bessie Barriscale, George Fisher and Herschel Mayall. The film takes place in Scotland and London.

== Cast ==
- Bessie Barriscale as Ariel
- George Fisher as Franklin Shirley
- Herschel Mayall as Abe Strohman
- Joseph J. Dowling as Andy MacTavish
- Myra Davis as Mrs. MacTavish
- Nick Cogley as Peter Winkenmulder
- Howard Hickman as Jules Picardo
- Jacob Abrams as Joseah Dods
- Ida Lewis as Serafina Dods
- Helen Dunbar as Mrs. Wellington Shackleford
- Lois Wilson as Elaine Shackleford
- Pietro Buzzi as Professor Duval
- Clifford Alexander as Richard Burrows
- Nona Thomas as Witch

== Preservation ==
With no prints of Maid o' the Storm located in any film archives, it is considered a lost film. In October 2019, the film was cited by the National Film Preservation Board on their Lost U.S. Silent Feature Films list.

== Bibliography ==
- Paul C. Spehr & Gunnar Lundquist. American Film Personnel and Company Credits, 1908-1920. McFarland, 1996.
