= Happiness (1917 film) =

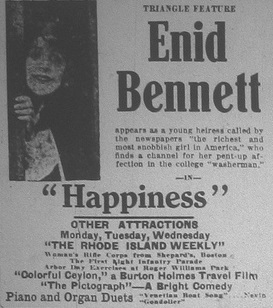
- Directed by: Reginald Barker
- Written by: C. Gardner Sullivan
- Starring: Enid Bennett; Charles Gunn; Thelma Salter
- Distributed by: Kay-Bee Pictures
- Release date: May 13, 1917
- Running time: 50 minutes
- Country: United States
- Languages: Silent; English intertitles

Happiness is a 1917 American silent comedy drama feature film written by C. Gardner Sullivan and starring Enid Bennett and Charles Gunn. A rich orphan and heiress played by Bennett is described in the newspapers as "the richest and most snobbish girl in America." She goes to a co-ed college where she is snubbed by students who view her as a snob. A romance develops with a poor student (played by Charles Gunn) who is taking in washing to pay his way through college. A print exists in the Library of Congress collection.

== Cast ==
- Enid Bennett - Doris Wingate
- Charles Gunn - Robert Lee Hollister
- Thelma Salter - Dolly Temple
- Andrew Arbuckle - Nicodemus
- Gertrude Claire - Miss Pratt
- Adele Belgrade - Priscilla Wingate
- John Gilbert - Richard Forrester
- Leo Willis - uncredited
