= Madcap Madge =

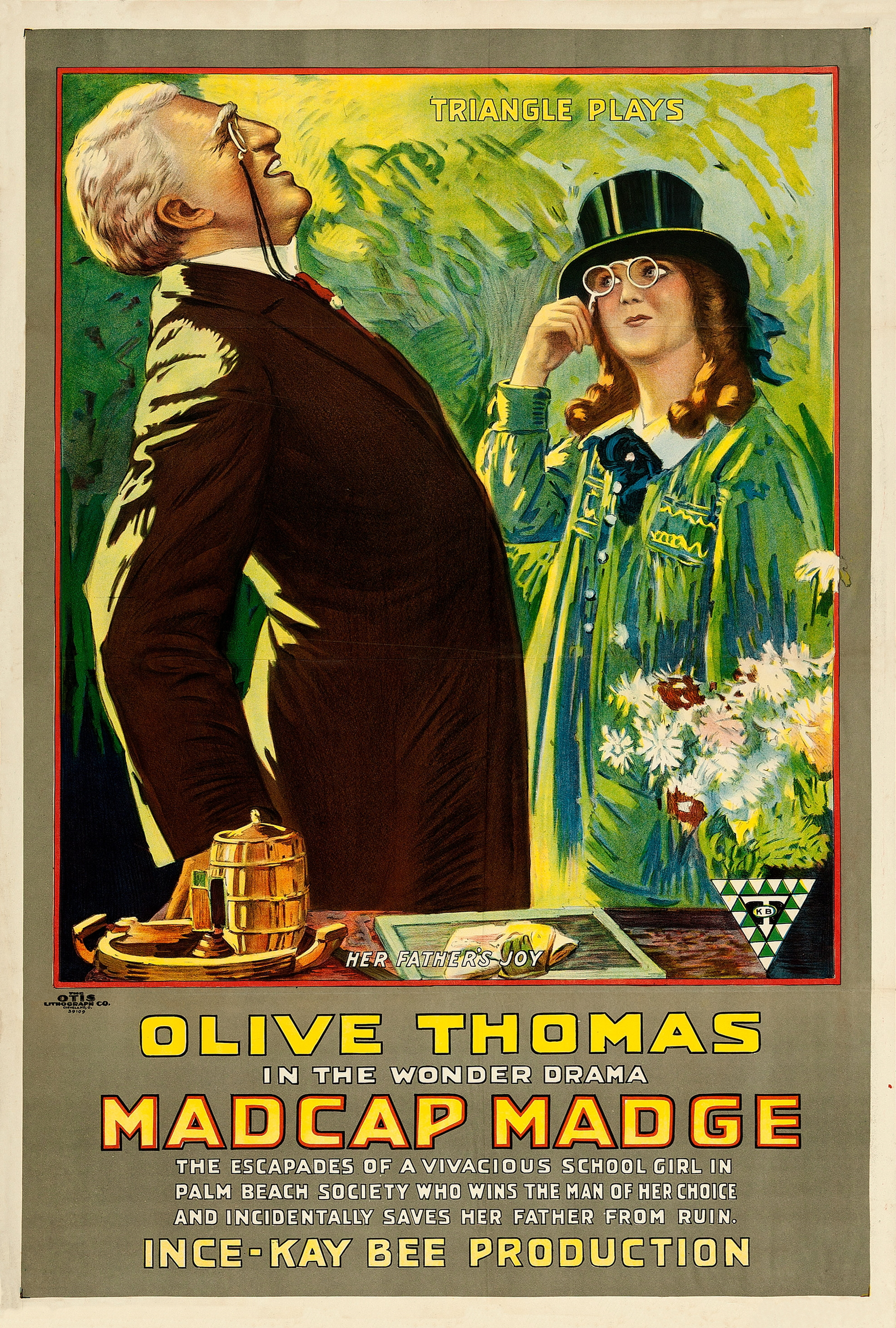
- Theatrical release poster
- Directed by: Raymond B. West
- Written by: R. Cecil Smith (scenario)
- Produced by: Thomas H. Ince
- Starring: Olive Thomas; Charles Gunn; Dorcas Matthews; Aggie Herring; Jack Livingston
- Cinematography: Charles J. Stumar
- Production companies: Kay-Bee Pictures; New York Motion Picture Company
- Distributed by: Triangle Film Corporation
- Release date: June 24, 1917
- Running time: 5 reels
- Country: United States
- Languages: Silent film (English intertitles)

Madcap Madge is a 1917 American silent comedy-drama film directed by Raymond B. West and starring Olive Thomas, Charles Gunn, Dorcas Matthews, Aggie Herring, and Jack Livingston. The film was released by Triangle Film Corporation on June 24, 1917.

== Cast ==
- Olive Thomas as Madge Flower
- Charles Gunn as Earl Denham
- Dorcas Matthews as Julia Flower
- Aggie Herring as Mrs. Flower
- Jack Livingston as Charles Lunkin
- J. Barney Sherry as Earl of Larsdale
- J. Frank Burke as Mr. Flower
- Gertrude Claire as Letitia Jane Adams

== Preservation ==
A 28 mm print of Madcap Madge is held by the George Eastman Museum.
