= Patriotism (1918 film) =

1918 silent film

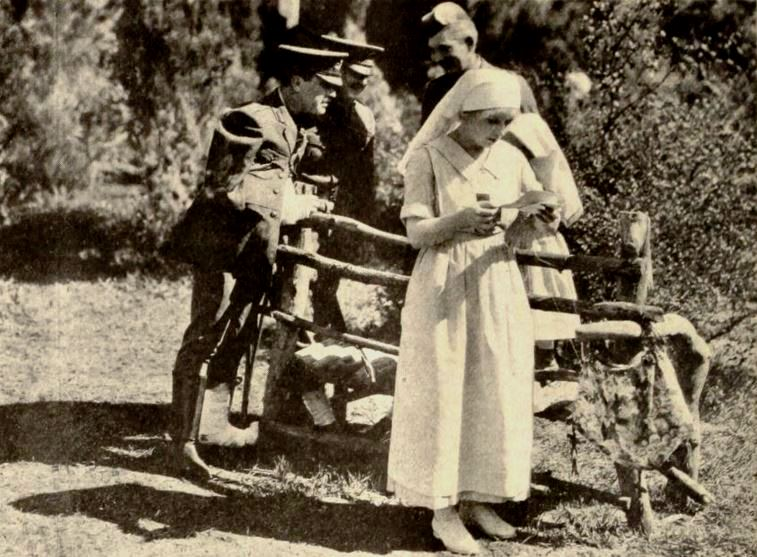
- Directed by: Raymond B. West
- Written by: Jane Holly; R.B. Kidd; Julian La Mothe
- Starring: Bessie Barriscale; Charles Gunn; Herschel Mayall
- Cinematography: Clyde De Vinna
- Production company: Paralta Plays
- Distributed by: Hodkinson Pictures
- Release date: June 10, 1918
- Running time: 60 minutes
- Country: United States
- Languages: Silent; English intertitles

Patriotism is a 1918 American silent drama film directed by Raymond B. West and starring Bessie Barriscale, Charles Gunn and Herschel Mayall. It is set in a Scottish nursing hospital during World War I.

== Cast ==
- Bessie Barriscale as Robin Cameron
- Charles Gunn as John Hamilton
- Herschel Mayall as Sidney Carson
- Arthur Allardt as Dr. Hyde
- Joseph J. Dowling as Sir Angus Cameron
- Mary Jane Irving as Mimi
- Ida Lewis as Mrs. MacTavish
- Clifford Alexander as Donald Cameron

== Preservation ==
With no prints of Patriotism located in any film archives, it is considered a lost film.

== Bibliography ==
- Paul M. Edwards. World War I on Film: English Language Releases through 2014. McFarland, 2016.
