= Time Locks and Diamonds =

1917 film

- Directed by: Walter Edwards
- Written by: J.G. Hawks; John Lynch
- Produced by: Thomas H. Ince
- Starring: William Desmond; Gloria Hope; Robert McKim
- Cinematography: Chester A. Lyons; Alfred Gosden
- Production companies: Kay-Bee Pictures; New York Motion Picture
- Distributed by: Triangle Distributing
- Release date: July 8, 1917
- Running time: 50 minutes
- Country: United States
- Languages: Silent; English intertitles

Time Locks and Diamonds is a lost 1917 American silent crime film directed by Walter Edwards and starring William Desmond, Gloria Hope and Robert McKim.

== Cast ==
- William Desmond as Silver Jim Farrel
- Gloria Hope as Marjory Farrel
- Robert McKim as Crabbe
- Rowland V. Lee as Edgar Seymour
- Mildred Harris as Lolita Mendoza
- George Beranger as Ramon Mendoza
- Tom Guise as Howe Seymour
- Milton Ross as Blaisdell
- Laura Sears as Maid
- Kate Bruce as Housekeeper
- Margaret Thompson as Rose

== Preservation ==
With no holdings located in archives, Time Locks and Diamonds is considered a lost film.

== Bibliography ==
- Katchmer, George A. A Biographical Dictionary of Silent Film Western Actors and Actresses. McFarland, 2015.
