= Arthur Allardt =

American actor

Arthur Allardt (April 7, 1883 - 1940) was an actor in silent films. He appeared in several movies with Joseph Franz (actor).

Allardt was born in New York City.

== Filmography ==
- The Ranger's Reward (1914), short
- Nugget Nell's Ward (1914)
- The Poison
- Strange Evidence (1914)
- The Heart of Smiling Joe (1914) as the sheriff
- Through the Keyhole
- The Gun Men of Plumas (1914)
- The Fatal Card (1915)
- The Runaway
- Put Yourself in His Place (1914)
- The Girl and the Hobo (1914)
- The Sheriff's Deputy (1914)
- The Fight in Lonely Gulch
- The Sheriff's Story (1914)
- Memories of Years Ago (1914)
- A Frontier Romance
- The Curse of Eve (1917)
- The Hidden Children (1917)
- Alimony (1917) as Elijah Stone
- Rose o' Paradise (1918) as Thomas Singleton
- A Man's Man (1918) as Dr. Pacheo
- One Dollar Bid (1918)
- Inside the Lines (1918)
- Patriotism (1918) as Dr. Hyde
- Louisiana (1919) as mountain youth Cass Floyd
- The Midnight Stage (1919)
