= Clarence Barr =

American actor

- Born: June 8, 1876; Omaha, Nebraska, US
- Died: June 1968 (aged 91)
- Years active: 1912–1918

Clarence Barr (June 8, 1876 – June 1968) was an American actor of the silent era. He appeared in 90 films between 1912 and 1918. He played Abraham Lincoln in the 1918 film Madam Who?

== Selected filmography ==
- Black and White (1913)
- The Ranchero's Revenge (1913)
- Almost a Wild Man (1913)
- Madam Who? (1918)
