= The Midnight Stage =

1919 film

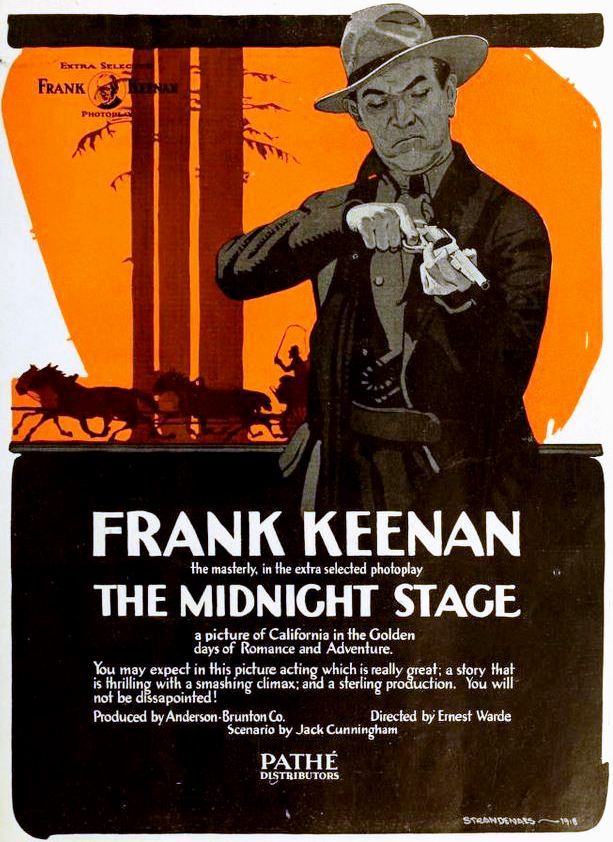
- poster
- Directed by: Ernest C. Warde
- Written by: Jack Cunningham
- Produced by: Anderson-Brunton
- Starring: Frank Keenan
- Cinematography: Charles E. Kaufman
- Distributed by: Pathé Exchange
- Release date: January 12, 1919
- Running time: 5 reels
- Country: United States
- Languages: Silent; English intertitles

The Midnight Stage is a 1919 American silent Western film directed by Ernest C. Warde and starring Frank Keenan. It was distributed by the Pathé Exchange company.

== Cast ==
- Frank Keenan as John Lynch/Bige Rivers
- Mignon Anderson as Mary Lynch
- Charles Gunn as Harvey James
- Maude George as Nita
- Ernest C. Warde as 'Rat' McGrough
- Dick La Reno as Boggs (* Richard La Reno)
- Arthur Allardt as Pasquale
- Tom Guise as Elias Lynch (* Thomas Guise)
- Joseph J. Dowling as Twisted Tuttle
- Wadsworth Harris as Joe Statler

== Censorship ==
Before The Midnight Stage could be exhibited in Kansas, the Kansas Board of Review required the elimination of the scene where Tuttle is hit on the head, and to shorten the hold-up and fight with girl.

== Preservation status ==
This film is preserved in the Cinematheque Francais.
