= Black and White (1913 film) =

1913 film directed by Dell Henderson

- Directed by: Dell Henderson
- Written by: William Beaudine
- Starring: Harry Carey
- Release date: August 28, 1913
- Country: United States
- Languages: Silent; English intertitles

Black and White is a 1913 American silent comedy film featuring Harry Carey. The one-reel short was made by the Biograph Company. It sometimes appeared under the alternate title His Darker Self. The scenarist, William Beaudine, was also the film's assistant director.

== Cast ==
- Harry Carey
- Donald Crisp
- Grace Henderson
- Dave Morris as The Tramp
- Clarence Barr as The Gardener (credited as Clarence L. Barr)

== See also ==
- List of American films of 1913
