= The Fuel of Life =

1917 film

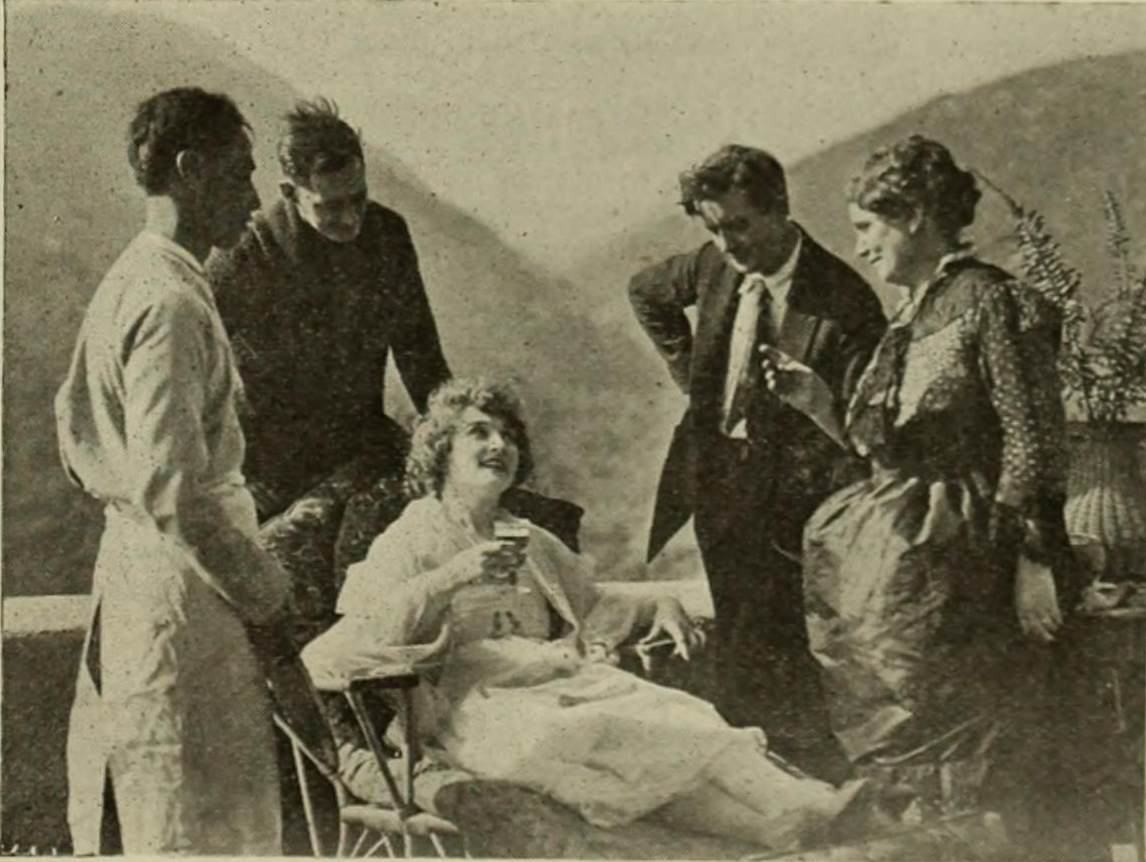
- Directed by: Walter Edwards
- Written by: Grant Wallace; Maude Reeves White
- Starring: Belle Bennett; Eugene Burr; Texas Guinan
- Cinematography: Gus Peterson
- Production company: Triangle Film Corporation
- Distributed by: Triangle Distributing
- Release date: November 18, 1917
- Running time: 50 minutes
- Country: United States
- Languages: Silent; English intertitles

The Fuel of Life is a 1917 American silent drama film directed by Walter Edwards and starring Belle Bennett, Eugene Burr and Texas Guinan.

== Cast ==
- Belle Bennett as Angela De Haven
- Eugene Burr as Rader
- Texas Guinan as Violet Hilton
- Tom Guise as Goldman
- Edward Hayden as Old Creede
- Lee Hill as Roger De Haven
- Estelle La Cheur as Mrs. Goldman
- Alberta Lee as Mrs. Spalding
- Frank Newburg as Bob Spalding
- Lee Phelps as Leonard Durant
- J. Barney Sherry as Bragdon Brant
- Margaret Shillingford as Mrs. Van Der Croot

== Bibliography ==
- Katchmer, George A. A Biographical Dictionary of Silent Film Western Actors and Actresses. McFarland, 2015.
