= Chicken Casey =

1917 film by Raymond B. West

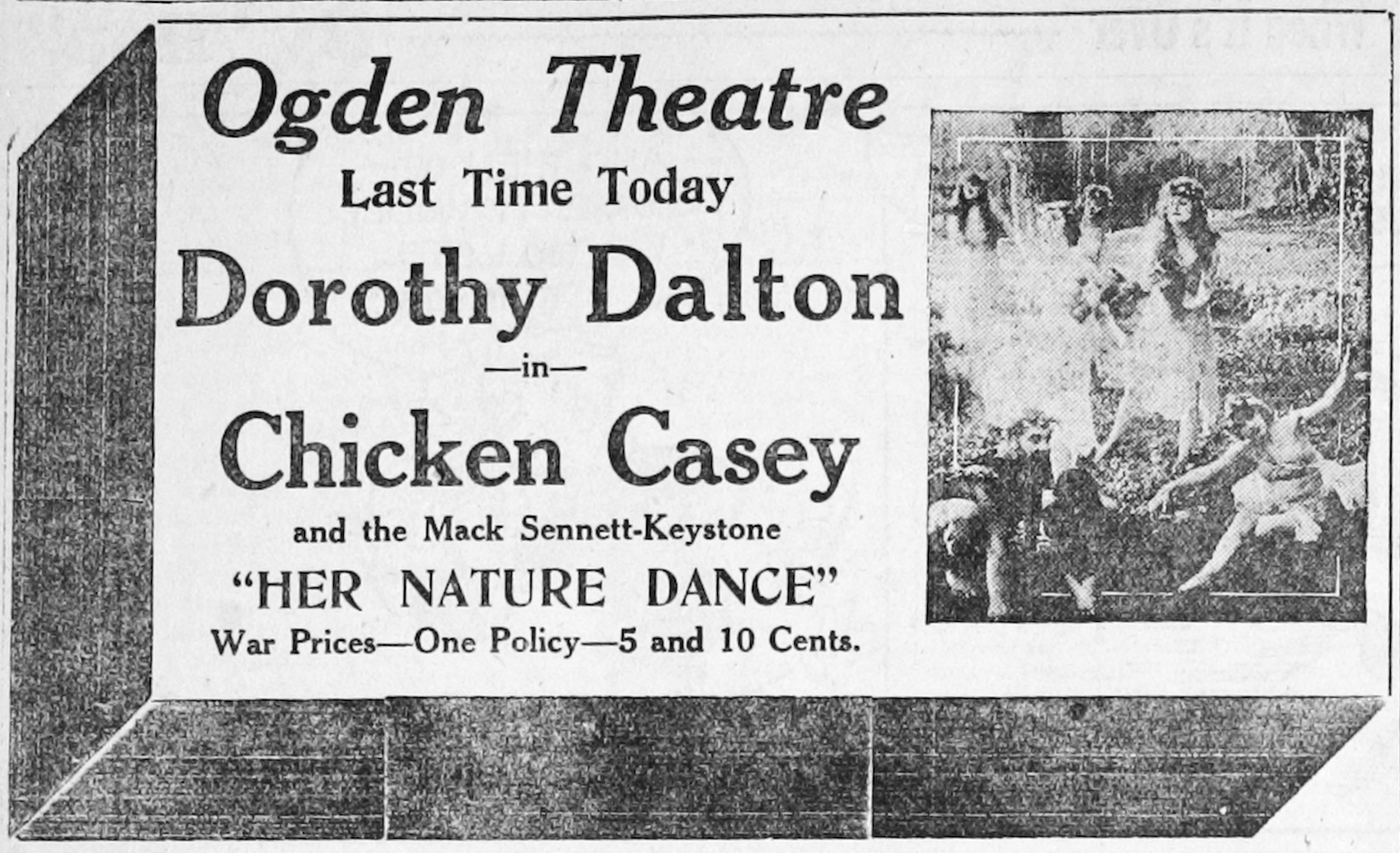
- Contemporary advertisement
- Directed by: Raymond B. West
- Written by: J.G. Hawks; Christine Silver (play)
- Produced by: Thomas H. Ince
- Starring: Dorothy Dalton; Charles Gunn; Howard Hickman
- Cinematography: Charles J. Stumar
- Production company: Kay-Bee Pictures
- Distributed by: Triangle Distributing
- Release date: January 28, 1917
- Country: United States
- Languages: Silent; English intertitles

Chicken Casey is a 1917 American silent comedy-drama film directed by Raymond B. West and starring Dorothy Dalton, Charles Gunn and Howard Hickman. Prints and/or fragments were found in the Dawson Film Find in 1978.

== Plot summary ==
A young author, Everett Dryden Hale, has written a book of such strength and originality that it becomes one of the bestsellers. The book is entitled "Waifs" and deals with the underworld, a subject of which Hale, who is a New Englander with a Puritanical strain, knows by personal experience, practically nothing at all. The principal character is a girl nicknamed "Rags" by her associates in the dives and haunts of night-life. A leading producer is anxious to have the book dramatized and his leading woman, Mavis Mayberry, insists on her right to create the part of "Rags." Hale accedes to the manager's request, but rejects Mavis for the part, as he believes her talent is exclusively of the refined comedy order. With the aid of a dramatic critic, Mavis stages a surprise for the author and is introduced as "Chicken Casey," a typical "Rags," in a low Bowery dive. She enacts the part so well that Hale, unaware that she is a famous actress, starts to reclaim her and informs the manager that he has found his ideal heroine and "Chicken Casey" must have the star role. The play is a success. Mavis playing the part of "Rags" with the same realism with which she invested the mock creation "Chicken Casey." Hale recognizes that he has been the victim of a trick, leaves the theater hurt and indignant. Mavis, whose masquerading had given her an insight into the nobility and chivalry of the man, way finds a to earn his forgiveness and secure a happy future for both star and author, and "Chicken Cnspv" becomes only a memory.

== Cast ==
- Dorothy Dalton as Chicken Casey / Mavis Marberry
- Charles Gunn as Everett Hale
- Howard Hickman as 'Dickey' Cochran
- Tom Guise as Israel Harris

== Bibliography ==
- Robert B. Connelly. The Silents: Silent Feature Films, 1910-36. December Press, 1998.
