= The Firefly of Tough Luck =

1917 film

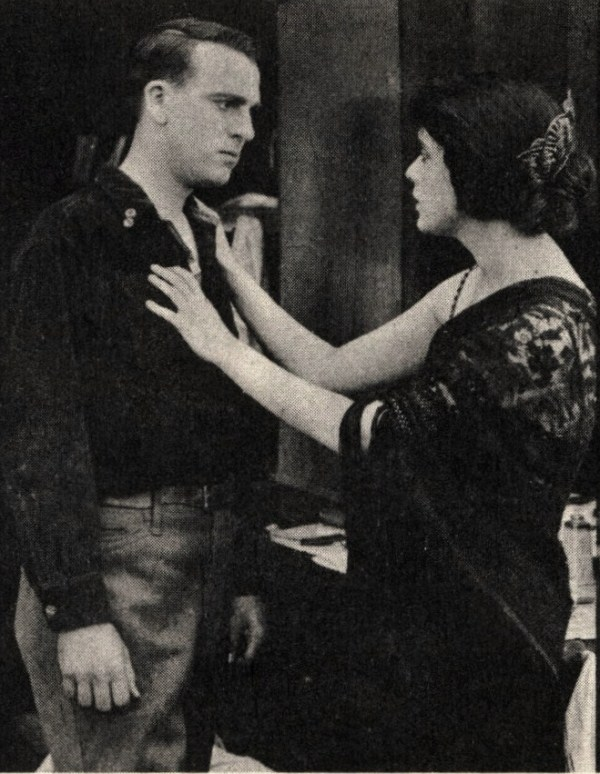
- Still featuring co-stars Charles Gunn and Alma Rubens
- Directed by: E. Mason Hopper; Alfred L. Werker (asst.)
- Screenplay by: J. G. Hawks
- Starring: Alma Rubens; Charles Gunn
- Cinematography: Charles J. Stumar
- Production company: Triangle Film Corporation
- Release date: October 21, 1917 (USA)
- Country: United States

The Firefly of Tough Luck is an American 1917 silent film directed by E. Mason Hopper and written by J. G. Hawks. It was produced and released by the Triangle Film Corporation, and starred Alma Rubens and Charles Gunn.

== Plot ==
The Firefly (Rubens), a cabaret performer at one of New York City's biggest restaurants, finds herself out of work as businesses close along Broadway during World War I. She accepts a position as an entertainer in a desert mining town called Baxter Junction, where a surprise is in store for her.

== Starring ==
- Alma Rubens as The Firefly
- Charles Gunn as Danny Ward
- Walt Whitman as "Tough Luck" Baxter
- Darrell Foss as Bert Wilcox
- Jack Curtis as Happy Jack Clarke

== Production ==
The production was filmed at Triangle's Culver City studio as well as in the desert. Rubens and Whitman disliked working on location in the sun and heat of August, so Hopper tried to minimize time shooting outdoor scenes.

== Release ==
The film was noted as a box-office smash.

== Preservation ==
The film is now considered lost.
