= The Snarl =

1917 film

- Directed by: Raymond B. West
- Written by: Lambert Hillyer; Leona Hutton
- Produced by: Thomas H. Ince
- Starring: Bessie Barriscale; Charles Gunn; Howard Hickman
- Cinematography: Charles J. Stumar
- Production companies: Kay-Bee Pictures; New York Motion Picture
- Distributed by: Triangle Distributing
- Release date: May 6, 1917
- Running time: 50 minutes
- Country: United States
- Languages: Silent; English intertitles

The Snarl is a 1917 American silent drama film directed by Raymond B. West and starring Bessie Barriscale, Charles Gunn and Howard Hickman. The film's sets were designed by the art director Robert Brunton.

== Cast ==
- Bessie Barriscale as Helen Dean / Marion Dean
- Charles Gunn as Monte Bruce
- Howard Hickman as Jack Mason
- Aggie Herring as Helen's Nurse
- Tom Guise as Opera Manager
- J. Barney Sherry as Doctor

== Preservation ==
With no prints of The Snarl located in any film archives, it is considered a lost film. In October 2019, the film was cited by the National Film Preservation Board on their Lost U.S. Silent Feature Films list.

== Bibliography ==
- Robert B. Connelly. The Silents: Silent Feature Films, 1910-36, Volume 40, Issue 2. December Press, 1998.
