= His Forgotten Wife =

1924 silent film by William A. Seiter

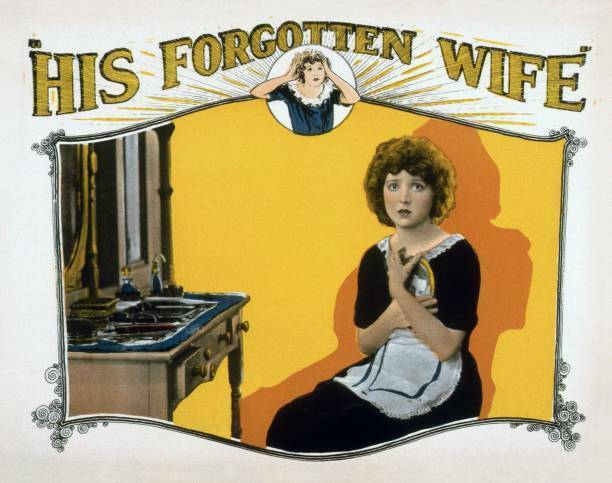
- Lobby card
- Directed by: William A. Seiter
- Written by: Del Andrews; Will Lambert
- Starring: Warner Baxter; Madge Bellamy; Tom Guise
- Cinematography: Max Dupont; Conrad Wells
- Production company: Palmer Photoplay Corporation
- Distributed by: Film Booking Offices of America
- Release date: April 14, 1924
- Running time: 70 minutes
- Country: United States
- Language: Silent (English intertitles)

His Forgotten Wife is a 1924 American silent drama film directed by William A. Seiter and starring Warner Baxter, Madge Bellamy, and Tom Guise.

== Plot ==
As described in a film magazine review, Donald Allen is reported killed in France during the war. His fiancee, Corinne McRea, inherits his property. Donald, a victim of lost memory through shock, returns to America married to his French nurse, Suzanne, under the name of John Rolfe. They both obtain jobs as servants at Donald's home. He is recognized by the estate trustee. Corinne attempts to escape with the bank roll, but is foiled by Suzanne. An operation restores Donald's memory of his old life, but he temporarily forgets Suzanne. However, he regains his lost consciousness in time to know his wife and all ends well.

== Cast ==
- Warner Baxter as Donald Allen / John Rolfe
- Madge Bellamy as Suzanne
- Tom Guise as Judge Henry
- Hazel Keener as Irene Humphrey
- Willis Marks as Meadows
- Eric Mayne as French Major
- Maude Wayne as Corinne McRea

== Bibliography ==
- Munden, Kenneth White. The American Film Institute Catalog of Motion Pictures Produced in the United States, Part 1. University of California Press, 1997.
