= The Tar Heel Warrior =

1917 film

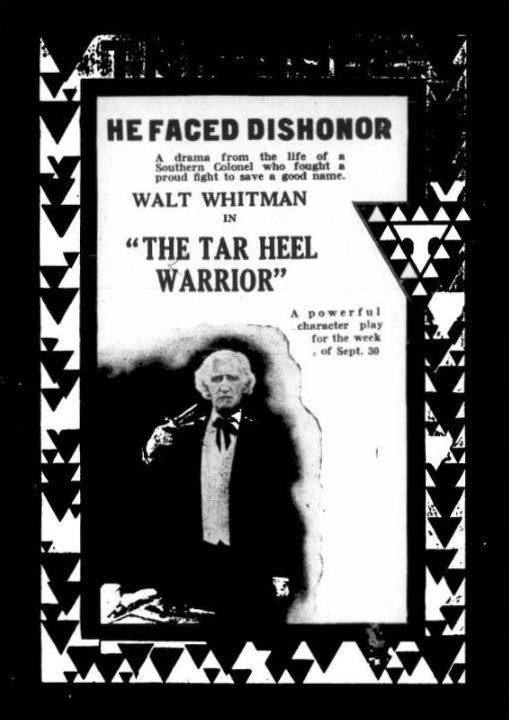
- Directed by: E. Mason Hopper
- Written by: J.G. Hawks
- Starring: Walt Whitman; Ann Forrest; William Shaw
- Cinematography: Charles J. Stumar
- Production company: Triangle Film Corporation
- Distributed by: Triangle Distributing
- Release date: September 30, 1917
- Running time: 50 minutes
- Country: United States
- Languages: Silent; English intertitles

The Tar Heel Warrior is a 1917 American silent drama film directed by E. Mason Hopper and starring Walt Whitman, Ann Forrest and William Shaw.

== Cast ==
- Walt Whitman as Col. Dabney Mills
- Ann Forrest as Betty Malroy
- William Shaw as Paul Darrell
- James McLaughlin as James Adams
- Dorcas Matthews as Anna Belle Adams
- George West as Uncle Tobe
- Clara Knight as Aunt Tillie
- J.P. Lockney as Lemuel L.Burke
- Wilbur Higby as John Mason
- Tom Guise as Major Amos

== Bibliography ==
- Robert B. Connelly. The Silents: Silent Feature Films, 1910-36, Volume 40, Issue 2. December Press, 1998.
