= Charles Gunn (actor) =

American actor

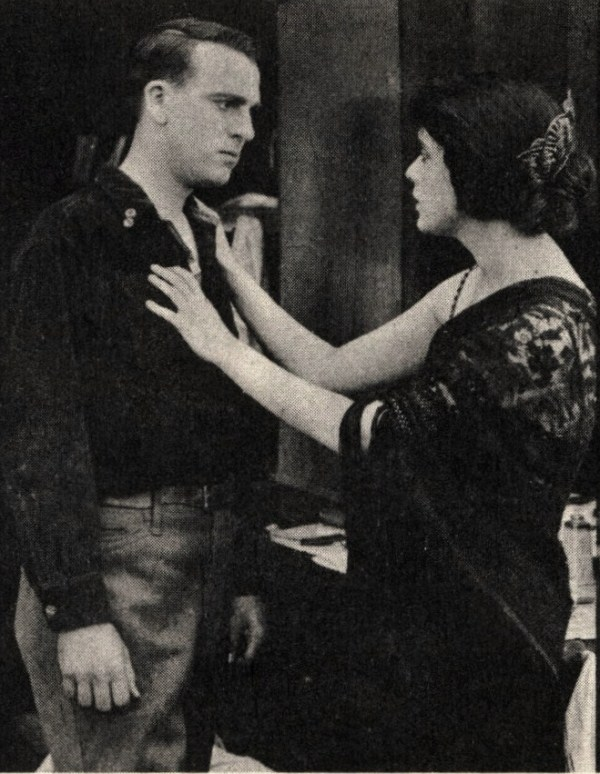
- Gunn with Alma Rubens in the 1917 comedy The Firefly of Tough Luck
- Born: Charles Edward Gunn; July 31, 1883; Wisconsin, US
- Died: December 6, 1918 (aged 35); Los Angeles, California, US
- Occupation: actor
- Spouse: Nina

Charles E. Gunn (July 31, 1883 – December 6, 1918) was an American silent film actor with the Vitagraph Company of America.

Gunn was born in Wisconsin but was educated in San Francisco after his family moved to California.

After debuting in a bit part in a play in San Francisco, Gunn acted on stage with the Harry Davis, Morosco, and Alcazar stock theater troupes, and was the leading man for theatrical companies in Cincinnati, Minneapolis, and Pittsburgh. He also toured in productions of St. Elmo and The Conspiracy.

On December 6, 1918, Gunn died in Los Angeles in the Spanish flu pandemic.

== Selected filmography ==
- Sherlock Holmes Solves the Sign of the Four (1913) *short
- The Best Man's Bride (1916) *short
- The Eagle's Wings (1916)
- Blood Will Tell (1917)
- Sweetheart of the Doomed (1917)
- The Snarl (1917)
- Happiness (1917)
- Love or Justice (1917)
- Madcap Madge (1917)
- Chicken Casey (1917)
- An Even Break (1917)
- Mountain Dew (1917)
- A Phantom Husband (1917)
- The Firefly of Tough Luck (1917)
- Framing Framers (1917)
- Betty Takes a Hand (1918)
- Captain of His Soul (1918)
- Unfaithful (1918)*short
- Patriotism (1918)
- Wedlock (1918)
- The White Lie (1918)
- The Flame of the West (1918)*short
- The Midnight Stage (1919)
- It Happened in Paris (1919)
