= One Dollar Bid =

1918 silent film

- Directed by: Ernest C. Warde
- Written by: Credo Fitch Harris (novel); Thomas J. Geraghty
- Starring: J. Warren Kerrigan; Lois Wilson; Leatrice Joy
- Cinematography: Charles J. Stumar
- Production company: Paralta Plays
- Distributed by: Hodkinson Pictures
- Release date: June 24, 1918
- Running time: 50 minutes
- Country: United States
- Languages: Silent; English intertitles

One Dollar Bid is a 1918 American silent drama film directed by Ernest C. Warde and starring J. Warren Kerrigan, Lois Wilson and Leatrice Joy.

== Cast ==
- J. Warren Kerrigan as Toby
- Lois Wilson as Virginia Dare
- Joseph J. Dowling as Colonel Poindexter Dare
- Leatrice Joy as Emily Dare
- Arthur Allardt as Ralph Patterson
- Jess Herring as Dink Wallerby
- Elvira Weil as Nell Wallerby
- Clifford Alexander as Bob Clark
- John Gilbert

== Preservation ==
With no prints of One Dollar Bid located in any film archives, it is considered a lost film.

== Bibliography ==
- Goble, Alan. The Complete Index to Literary Sources in Film. Walter de Gruyter, 1999.
