= Ida Lewis (actress) =

American actress (1848–1935)

- Born: Ida May Lewis; May 1848(or 1855); New York City, U.S.
- Died: April 21, 1935; Los Angeles, California, U.S.
- Resting place: Hollywood Forever Cemetery
- Occupation: Actress
- Years active: 1911-1932

Ida May Lewis (May 1848 - April 21, 1935) was an American stage and screen actress. She started in the theater when Daly and Wallack were the top manager impresarios. She later appeared in many silent films allegedly beginning with David Horsley studios in 1911. From 1913 she did much silent film work. She appeared in Frank Keenan's version of The Bells in 1918. Her final film was in 1932 in an uncredited role in the May Robson 'Grandma' segment of If I Had a Million.

Lewis died at her home in Los Angeles on April 21, 1935, and was buried somewhere in Hollywood Forever Cemetery as her listed plot had been removed by 1935.

== Selected filmography ==
- The Mating (1915)
- A Man's Man (1918)
- Humdrum Brown (1918)
- Blue Blood (1918)
- More Trouble (1918)
- Patriotism (1918)
- Wedlock (1918)
- Maid o' the Storm (1918)
- Inside the Lines (1918)
- The Bells (1918)
- Dangerous Waters (1919)
- Mary's Ankle (1920)
- Paris Green (1920)
- Peaceful Valley (1920)
- A Man's Man (1923) (*a rerelease of the 1918 film)
- Some Pun'kins (1925)
- Sweet Adeline (1926)
- Law of Fear (1928)
- Sinners in the Sun (1932)
- If I Had a Million (1932)*uncredited
