= A Man's Man (1917 film) =

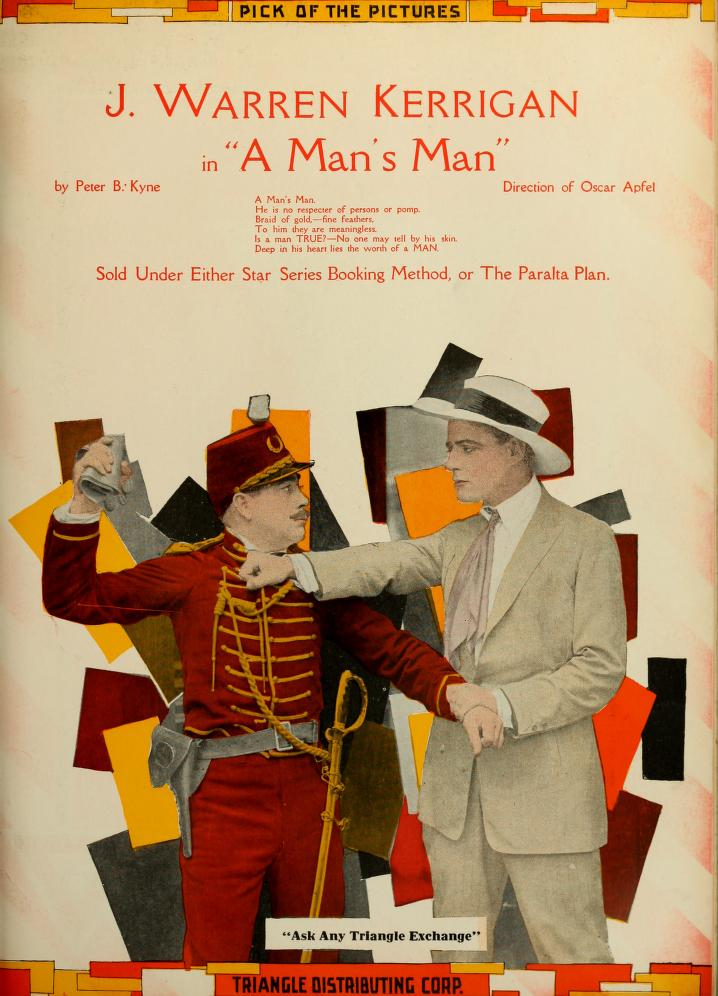
- Advertisement
- Directed by: Oscar Apfel
- Story by: Peter B. Kyne
- Produced by: Paralta Plays; Robert Brunton
- Starring: J. Warren Kerrigan; Lois Wilson
- Cinematography: L. Guy Wilky
- Distributed by: W. W. Hodkinson Corporation
- Release date: October 1, 1917
- Running time: 70 minutes
- Country: United States
- Language: Silent (English intertitles)

A Man's Man is a lost 1917 American silent adventure film directed by Oscar Apfel and produced by Paralta Plays. It starred J. Warren Kerrigan and Lois Wilson, the pair famous for appearing in The Covered Wagon.

== Plot ==
As described in a film magazine, mining engineer John Stuart Webster (Kerrigan) is headed for Central America. While on his way to Mexico, at a truck stop in Arizona he saves a handsome young girl Dolores (Wilson) from the annoyance of a traveling salesman, and henceforth falls in love with her. Webster is a peace-loving individual, but is all fight when a fight is required. When he arrives in Sobrante, he runs into one of the periodic revolutions. He rescues Dolores from the revolutionaries, with her father being killed and Webster almost killed. She nurses him back to health, and he saves the country, marries the girl, and they set out on a happy life.

== Cast ==
- J. Warren Kerrigan as John Stuart Webster
- Lois Wilson as Dolores Ruey
- Kenneth Harlan as Billy Geary
- Edward Coxen as John Cafferty
- Ida Lewis as Mother Jenks
- Harry von Meter as Ricardo Ruey
- Eugene Pallette as Captain Benevido
- Ernest Pasqué as Captain Arredondo
- Arthur Allardt as Dr. Pacheo
- Joseph J. Dowling as President Sarros
- John Steppling as Neddy Jerome
- Wallace Worsley as Henry Jenks

== 1923 version ==
Apparently this film was re-released by FBO in 1923 in a 50-minute version.
