= Madam Who? =

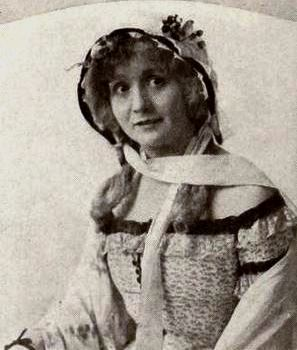
- Bessie Barriscale
- Directed by: Reginald Barker
- Written by: Monte M. Katterjohn; Clyde De Vinna; Harold MacGrath (story)
- Starring: Bessie Barriscale
- Cinematography: Clyde De Vinna
- Production company: Paralta Plays
- Distributed by: W. W. Hodkinson Corporation; General Film Company
- Release date: January 1, 1918
- Running time: 7 reels
- Country: United States
- Language: Silent (English intertitles)

Madam Who? is a 1918 American silent drama film directed by Reginald Barker and starring Bessie Barriscale. It was produced by Paralta Plays and distributed through W. W. Hodkinson Corporation and the General Film Company.

The film was adapted from a Harold MacGrath story by Monte M. Katterjohn and Clyde De Vinna. Art direction for the film was done by Robert Brunton.

== Cast ==
- Bessie Barriscale as Jeanne Beaufort
- Edward Coxen as John Armitage
- Howard Hickman as Henry Morgan
- Joseph J. Dowling as 'Parson' John Kennedy
- David Hartford as Alan Crandall
- Fanny Midgley as Mrs. Howard
- Nick Cogley as Mose
- Eugene Pallette as Lt. Conroy
- Wallace Worsley as Albert Lockhart
- Clarence Barr as President Abraham Lincoln
- Bert Hadley as General Grant

== Preservation ==
A 35 mm print of Madam Who? is held by the Library of Congress, though its database entry does not specify if the print is complete.

== See also ==
- List of films and television shows about the American Civil War
