= William S. Hart filmography =

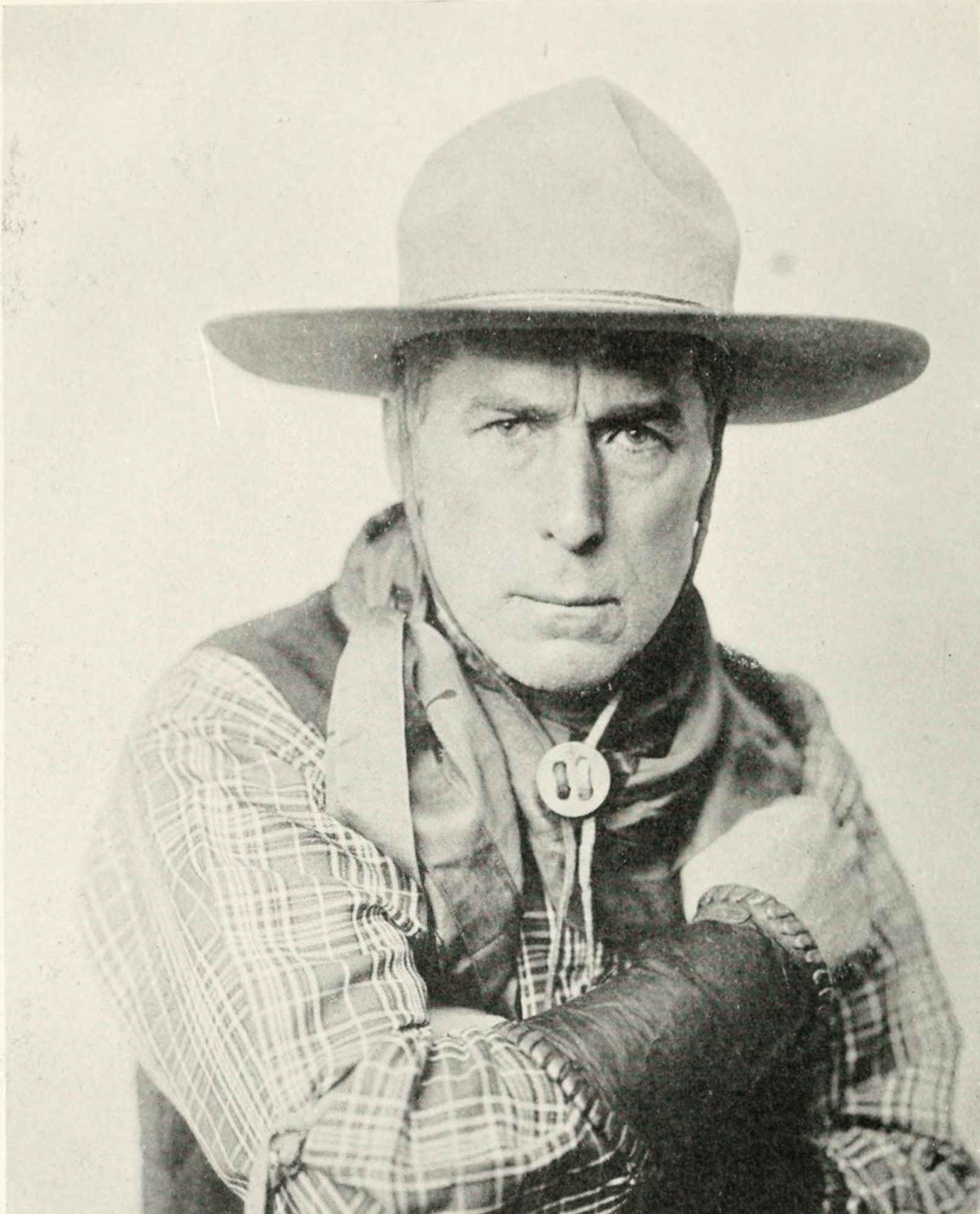
William S. Hart, c. 1920

William S. Hart (1864–1946) was an American silent film actor, screenwriter, director and producer. He is remembered as a foremost Western star of the silent era who "imbued all of his characters with honor and integrity." During the late 1910s and early 1920s, he was one of the most consistently popular movie stars, frequently ranking high among male actors in popularity contests held by movie fan magazines.

Hart was born in New York and began his acting career in 1888. He had success as a Shakespearean actor on Broadway, and appeared in the original stage production of Ben-Hur (1899). He entered films in 1914, and after playing supporting roles in two short films, he achieved stardom the same year as the lead in the feature The Bargain. Hart was particularly interested in making realistic Western films. His films are noted for their authentic costumes and props, as well as Hart's acting ability, honed on Shakespearean theater stages in the United States and England. Beginning in 1915, Hart starred in his own series of two-reel Western short subjects for producer Thomas Ince, which were so popular that they were supplanted by a series of feature films. In 1915 and 1916, exhibitors voted him the biggest money making star in the United States. In 1917, Hart accepted a lucrative offer from Adolph Zukor to join Famous Players–Lasky, which merged into Paramount Pictures.

By the early 1920s, Hart's brand of gritty, rugged Westerns with drab costumes and moralistic themes gradually fell out of fashion. The public became attracted by a new kind of movie cowboy, epitomized by Tom Mix, who wore flashier costumes and was involved in more action scenes. Paramount dropped Hart, who then made one last bid for his kind of Western. He produced Tumbleweeds (1925) with his own money, arranging to release it independently through United Artists. After Tumbleweeds, Hart retired to his to home in Newhall, California.

For his contribution to the motion picture industry, William S. Hart has a star on the Hollywood Walk of Fame at 6363 Hollywood Blvd. In 1975, he was inducted into the Western Performers Hall of Fame at the National Cowboy & Western Heritage Museum in Oklahoma City, Oklahoma. As of May 2026, two of the films Hart starred in—The Bargain and Hell's Hinges—along with Show People, in which he has a cameo, have been added to the National Film Registry.

== Filmography ==
Release date	Title	Role	Credited as			Notes	Ref.
Release date	Title	Role	Director	Writer	Producer	Notes	Ref.
July 2, 1914	His Hour of Manhood	Pete Larson				Two reels; survival status unknown	
July 23, 1914	Jim Cameron's Wife	Andy Stiles				Two reels; survival status unknown	
December 3, 1914	The Bargain	Jim Stokes				Added to the National Film Registry in 2010	
December 23, 1914	The Passing of Two-Gun Hicks	Two-Gun Hicks	Yes			Two reels; survival status unknown	
December 25, 1914	In the Sagebrush Country	Jim Brandon	Yes			Two reels	
January 6, 1915	The Scourge of the Desert	Bill Evers	Yes			Two reels; survival status unknown	
February 19, 1915	Mr. "Silent" Haskins	Lon Haskins	Yes			Two reels	
February 25, 1915	The Grudge	Rio Ed	Yes			Two reels; survival status unknown	
February 26, 1915	The Sheriff's Streak of Yellow	Sheriff Hale	Yes			Two reels; survival status unknown	
April 9, 1915	The Roughneck	Dave Page	Yes			Two reels	
April 15, 1915	On the Night Stage	"Silent Texas" Smith					
April 16, 1915	The Taking of Luke McVane	Luke McVane	Yes			Two reels	
May 6, 1915	The Man from Nowhere	Buck Varley - the Man from Nowhere	Yes			Two reels	
May 21, 1915	Bad Buck of Santa Ynez	Bad Buck Peters	Yes			Two reels	
May 31, 1915	The Darkening Trail	Yukon Ed	Yes				
June 2, 1915	The Conversion of Frosty Blake	Frosty Blake	Yes			Two reels	
July 7, 1915	Tools of Providence	Steve Blake	Yes			Two reels	
July 14, 1915	The Ruse	"Bat" Peters	Yes			Two reels	
July 21, 1915	Cash Parrish's Pal	Cash Parrish	Yes			Two reels	
August 20, 1915	Knight of the Trail	Jim Treen	Yes			Two reels	
August 25, 1915	Pinto Ben	Boss Rider	Yes	Yes		Two reels	
August 27, 1915	Keno Bates, Liar	Keno Bates	Yes			Two reels	
November 21, 1915	The Disciple	Jim Houston	Yes				
January 2, 1916	Between Men	Bob White	Yes				
February 3, 1916	Hell's Hinges	Blaze Tracy	Yes			Added to the National Film Registry in 1994	
April 9, 1916	The Aryan	Steve Denton	Yes				
May 21, 1916	The Primal Lure	Angus McConnell	Yes			Lost film	
June 25, 1916	The Apostle of Vengeance	David Hudson				Lost film	
July 23, 1916	The Captive God	Chiapa					
September 3, 1916	The Patriot	Bob Wiley	Yes			Lost film	
September 24, 1916	The Dawn Maker	Joe Elk	Yes			Lost film	
October 15, 1916	The Return of Draw Egan	Draw Egan aka William Blake	Yes				
November 26, 1916	The Devil's Double	"Bowie" Blake	Yes			Lost film	
January 7, 1917	Truthful Tulliver	Truthful Tulliver	Yes				
February 11, 1917	The Gunfighter	Cliff Hudspeth	Yes				
March 25, 1917	The Desert Man	Jim Alton	Yes				
April 22, 1917	The Square Deal Man	Jack O'Diamonds	Yes				
May 27, 1917	Wolf Lowry	Tom "Wolf" Lowery	Yes				
November 17, 1917	The Cold Deck	Jefferson "On-the-Level" Leigh	Yes				
October 1917	All-Star Production of Patriotic Episodes for the Second Liberty Loan	Himself				½ reel	
November 26, 1917	The Silent Man	"Silent" Budd Marr	Yes				
December 30, 1917	The Narrow Trail	Ice Harding		Yes	Yes		
January 14, 1918	Wolves of the Rail	"Buck" Andrade	Yes	Yes	Yes		
February 18, 1918	Blue Blazes Rawden	Blue Blazes Rawden	Yes		Yes		
April 1, 1918	The Tiger Man	Hawk Parsons	Yes		Yes		
May 20, 1918	Selfish Yates	"Selfish" Yates	Yes		Yes		
July 8, 1918	Shark Monroe	Shark Monroe	Yes		Yes		
August 19, 1918	Riddle Gawne	Jefferson "Riddle" Gawne	Yes		Yes	Two of five reels exist; co-stars Lon Chaney	
September 1918	A Bullet for Berlin	Himself	Yes	Yes	Yes	½ reel	
September 10, 1918	The Border Wireless	Steve Ransom	Yes		Yes	Lost film	
December 15, 1918	Branding Broadway	Robert Sands	Yes		Yes		
February 2, 1919	Breed of Men	Careless Carmody			Yes		
March 16, 1919	The Poppy Girl's Husband	Hairpin Harry Dutton	Yes		Yes	Lost film	
April 20, 1919	The Money Corral	Lem Beason		Yes	Yes		
July 15, 1919	Square Deal Sanderson	Square Deal Sanderson	Yes		Yes	Co-directed by Lambert Hillyer	
July 21, 1919	Wagon Tracks	Buckskin Hamilton			Yes	Directed by Lambert Hillyer	
November 2, 1919	John Petticoats	"Hardwood" John Haynes			Yes	Directed by Lambert Hillyer	
April 28, 1920	The Toll Gate	Black Deering		Yes	Yes	Directed by Lambert Hillyer	
June 27, 1920	Sand!	Dan Kurrie			Yes	Directed by Lambert Hillyer	
October 17, 1920	The Cradle of Courage	"Square" Kelly			Yes	Directed by Lambert Hillyer	
December 26, 1920	The Testing Block	"Sierra" Bill		Yes	Yes	Directed by Lambert Hillyer	
December 20, 1921	O'Malley of the Mounted	Sergeant O'Malley		Yes	Yes	Directed by Lambert Hillyer; remade in 1936 with George O'Brien	
March 27, 1921	The Whistle	Robert Evans			Yes	Directed by Lambert Hillyer	
October 16, 1921	Three Word Brand	Ben Trego / Three Word Brand / Governor Marsden			Yes	Directed by Lambert Hillyer	
December 18, 1921	White Oak	Oak Miller - A Gambling Man		Yes	Yes	Directed by Lambert Hillyer	
March 11, 1922	Travelin' On	J.B.		Yes	Yes	Directed by Lambert Hillyer	
August 19, 1923	Hollywood	Himself (cameo)				Lost film; directed by James Cruze	
December 2, 1923	Wild Bill Hickok	Wild Bill Hickok		Yes		Directed by Clifford Smith	
March 2, 1924	Singer Jim McKee	"Singer" Jim McKee		Yes	Yes	Directed by Clifford Smith	
December 27, 1925	Tumbleweeds	Don Carver			Yes	Directed by King Baggot; reissued in 1939 with Hart in a new talking prologue	
November 11, 1928	Show People	Himself (cameo)				Directed by King Vidor; added to the National Film Registry in 2003	

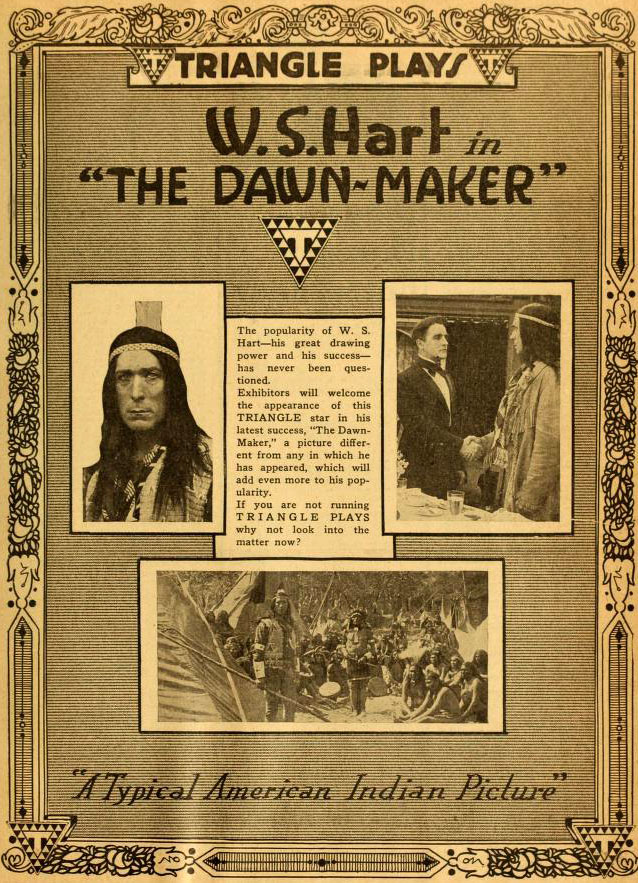
The Dawn Maker (1916)

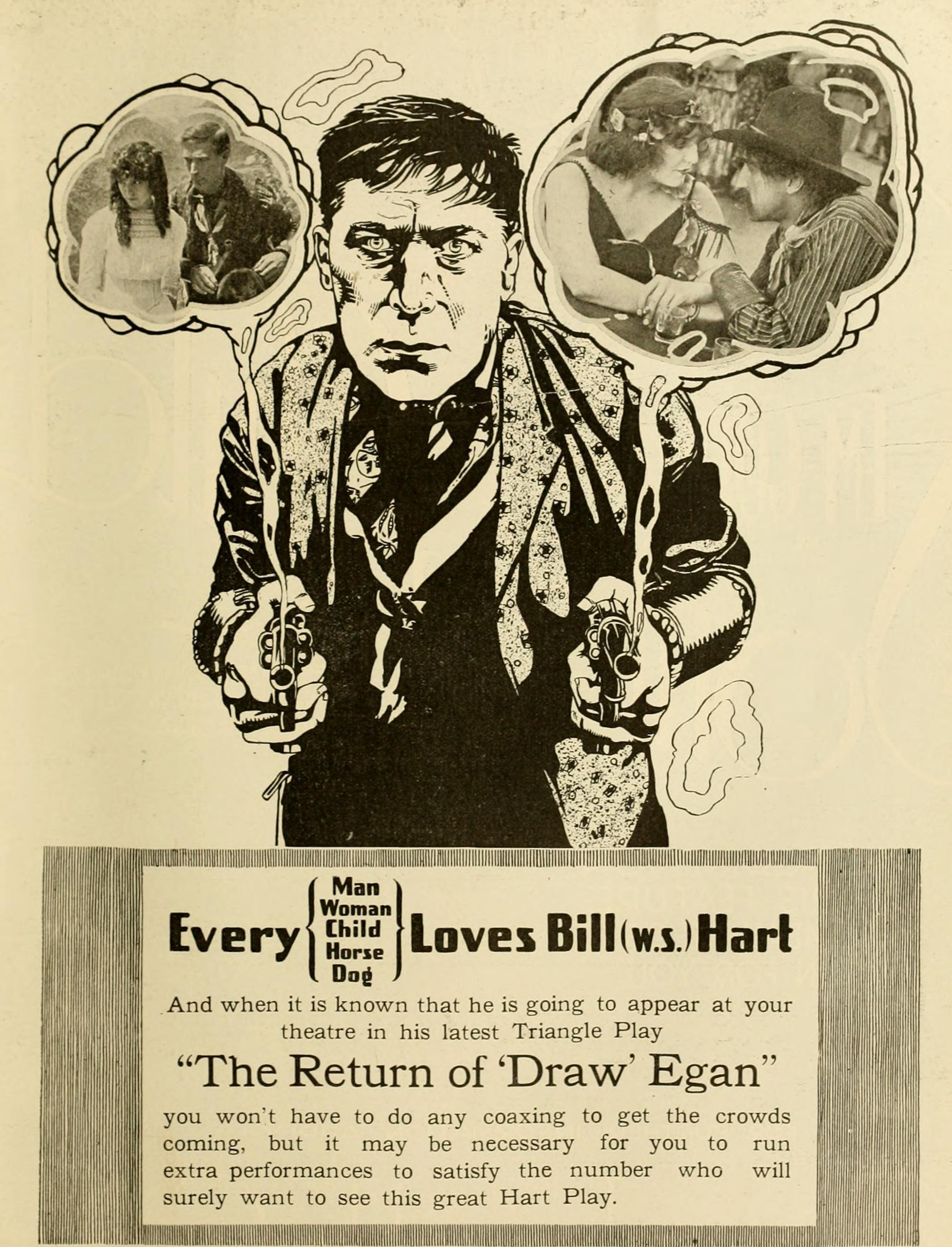
The Return of Draw Egan (1916)

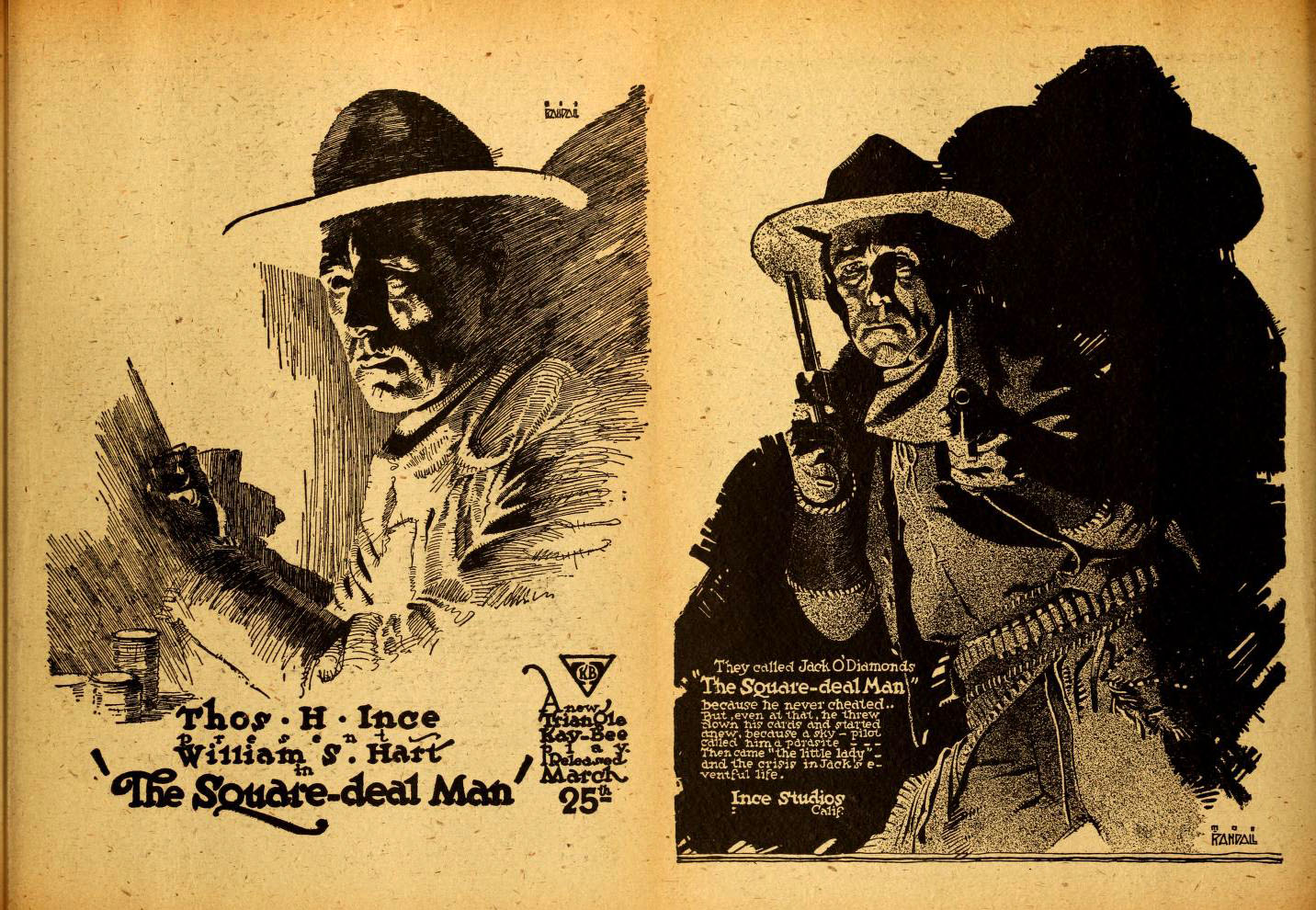
The Square Deal Man (1917)

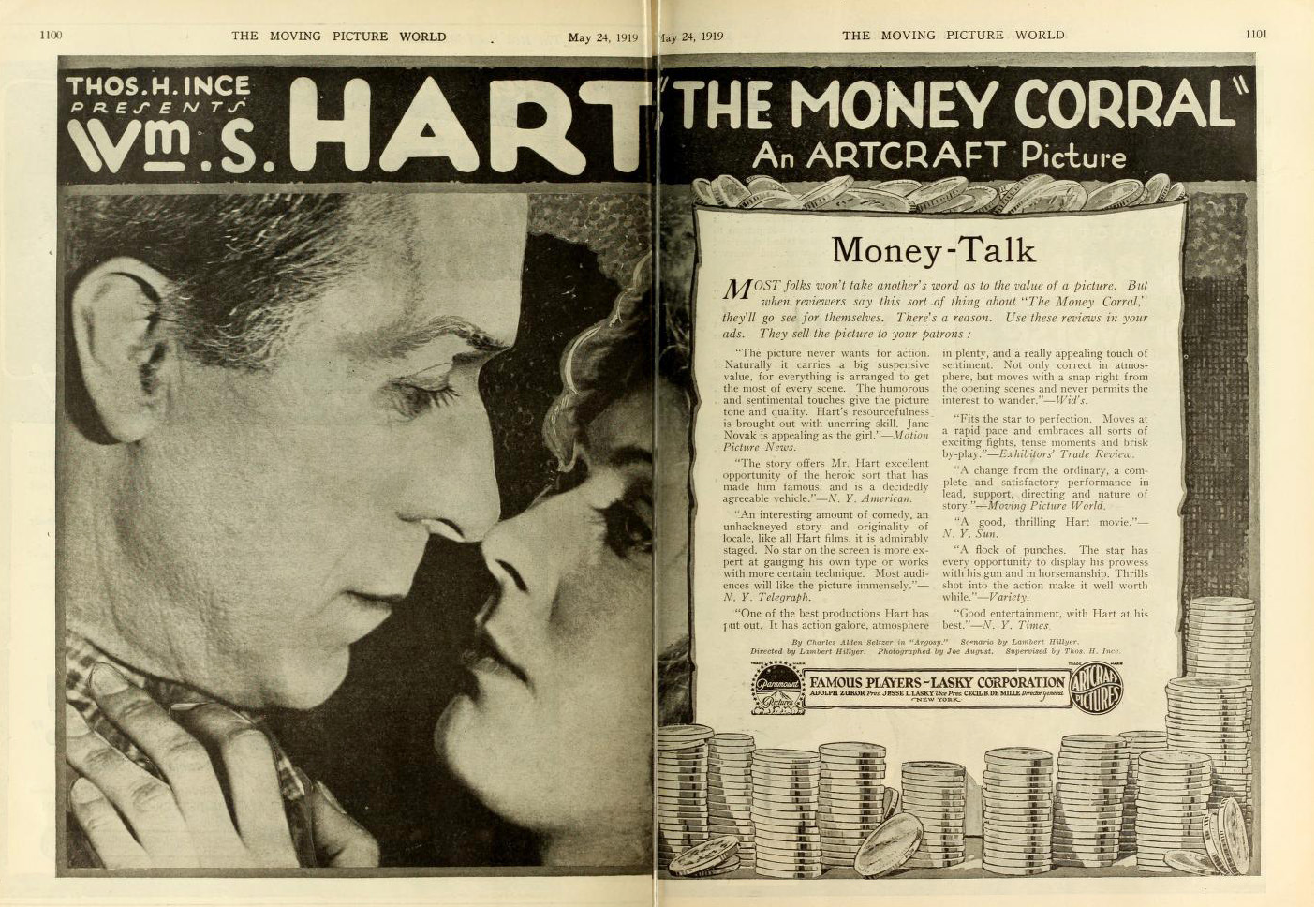
The Money Corral (1919)

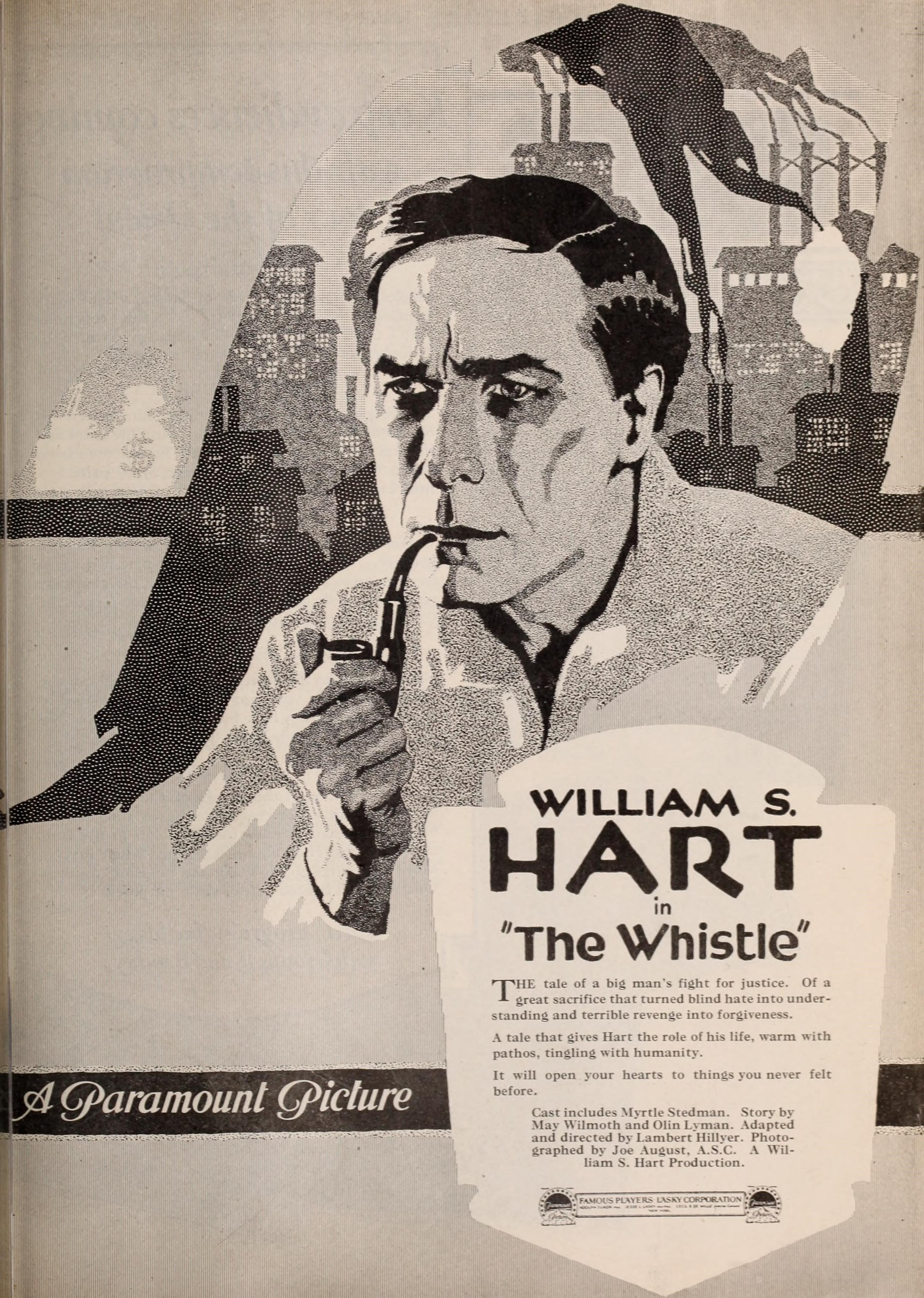
The Whistle (1921)

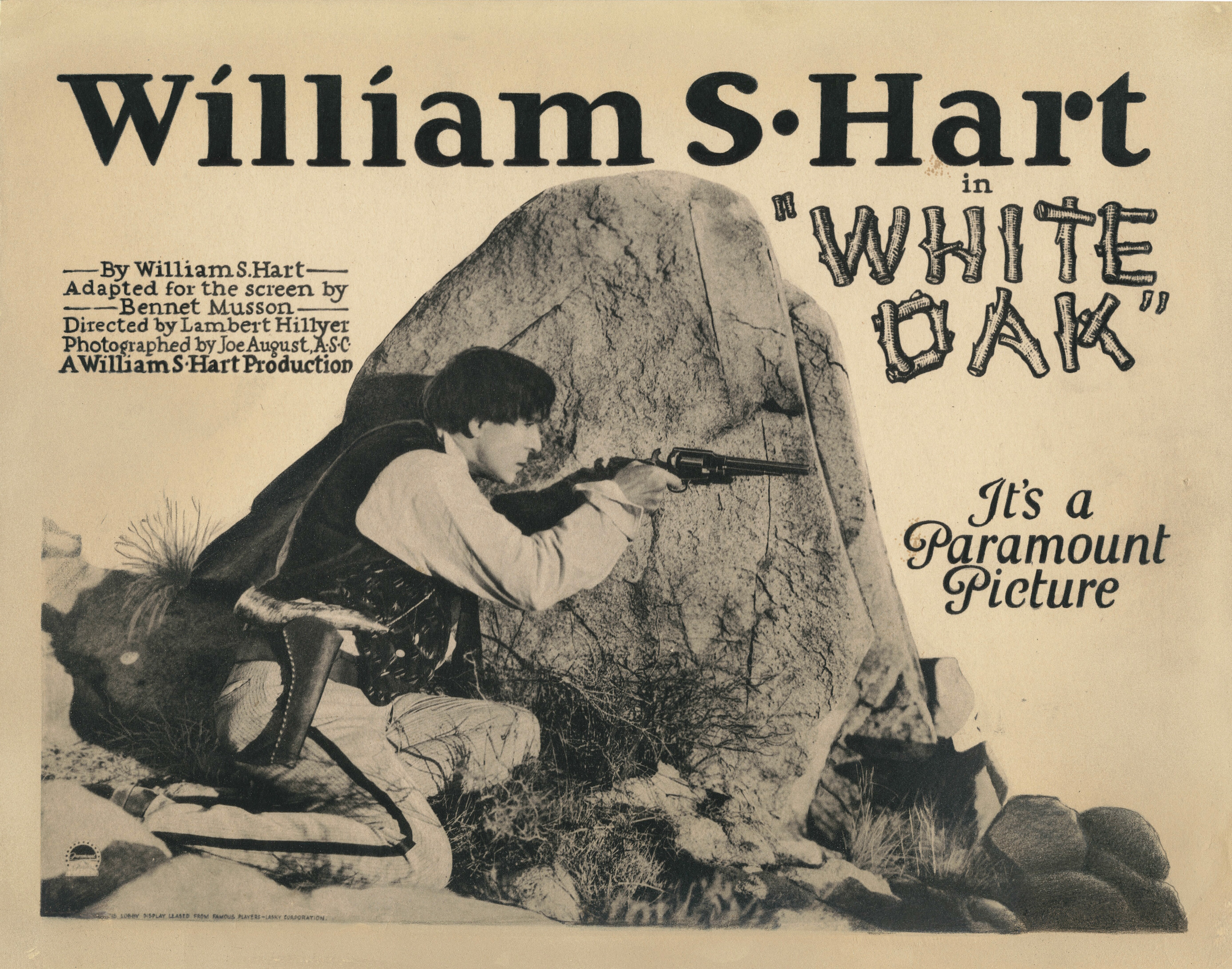
White Oak (1921)

== Bibliography ==
- Everson, William K. (January 1, 1992). The Hollywood Western: 90 Years of Cowboys and Indians, Train Robbers, Sheriffs and Gunslingers, and Assorted Heroes and Desperados. New York, NY: Citadel Press. ISBN 0-8065-1256-3.
- Koszarski, Diane Kaiser (January 1, 1980). The Complete Films of William S. Hart: A Pictorial Record. New York, NY: Dover Publications. ISBN 978-0486238630.
