= C. Gardner Sullivan =

American screenwriter (1884–1965)

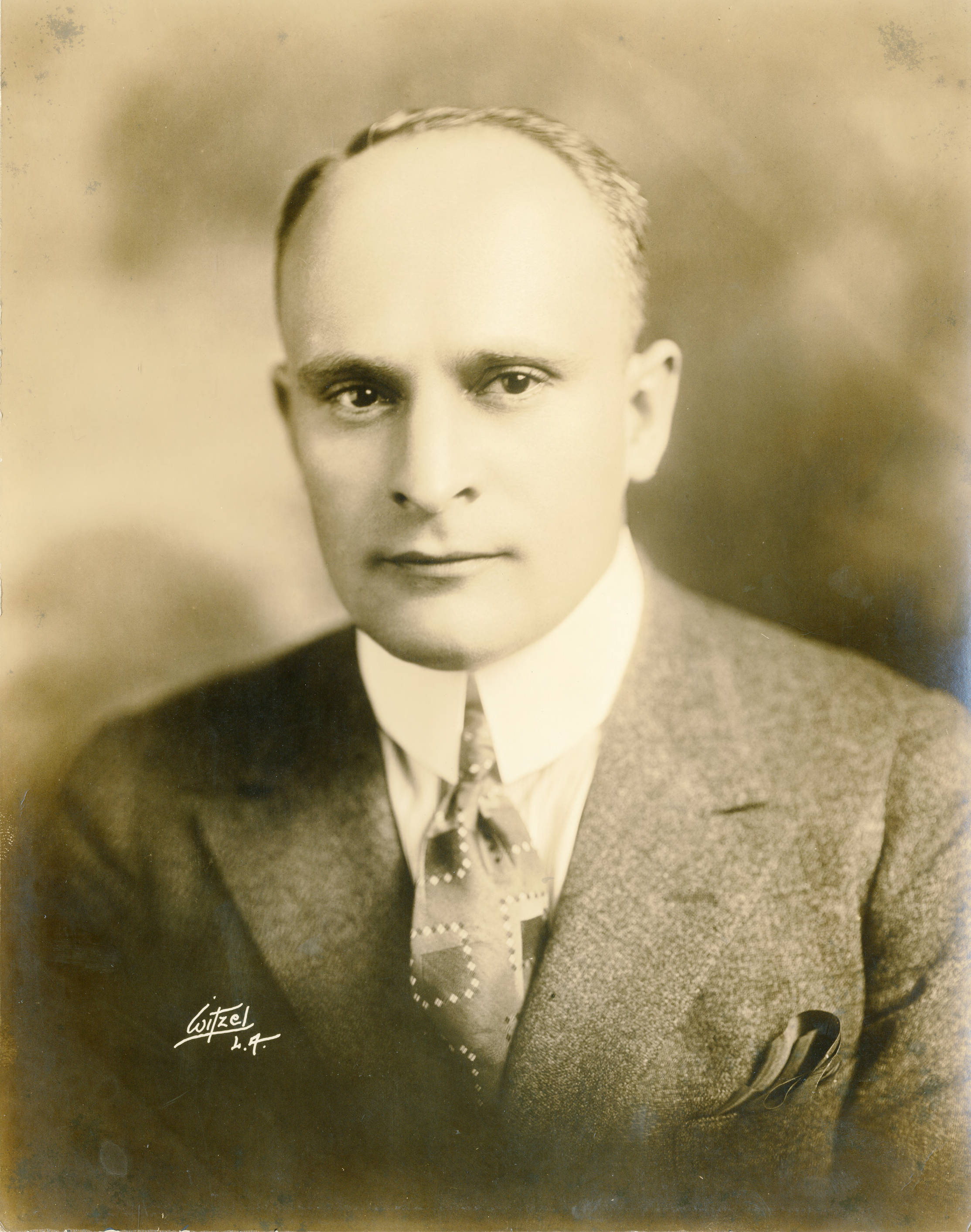
- Born: Charles Gardner Sullivan; September 18, 1884; Stillwater, Minnesota, U.S.
- Died: September 5, 1965 (aged 80); Los Angeles, California, U.S.
- Occupations: Screenwriter; Film producer
- Years active: 1912–1958
- Spouse: Ann May (m. 1925)
- Children: 4

Charles Gardner Sullivan (September 18, 1884 – September 5, 1965) was an American screenwriter and film producer. He was a prolific writer with more than 350 films among his credits. In 1924, the magazine Story World selected him on a list of the ten individuals who had contributed the most to the advancement of the motion picture industry from its inception forward. Four of Sullivan's films, The Italian (1915), Civilization (1916), Hell's Hinges (1916), and All Quiet on the Western Front (1930), have been listed in the National Film Registry.

== Early years ==
Sullivan was born in Stillwater, Minnesota, and educated in the public schools of St. Paul, Minnesota. Interviewed in 1916, Sullivan said he was "not precisely what one would call a college man, although I had some training at the University of Minnesota.

In 1907, Sullivan went into the newspaper business, working on the staff of the St. Paul Daily News at a starting salary of six dollars per week. Shortly afterward, Sullivan was assigned to write a column that he later said "was supposed to be a humorous column." He moved to New York where he joined the staff of the New York Evening Journal. While working in New York, a colleague showed him an advertisement by a motion picture company in the Saturday Evening Post inviting new authors to contribute stories. Gardner recalled it was that advertisement that got him started with "photoplay writing".

Sullivan's first script was returned to him, and he did not make another submission for some time. The first story he sold was Her Polished Family, which was purchased by Edison Studios for $25.

He later submitted a western story to the New York Motion Picture Corporation run by Thomas H. Ince and received a check for $50. In the following months, Ince's company purchased sixty of Sullivan's stories.

== Hollywood screenwriter ==
In 1914, Ince offered Sullivan a full-time job in Hollywood as a member of his movie studio's "scenario staff". By that time, Sullivan had married and was uncertain about moving to California. However, he accepted and for the next decade became the "dean" of Hollywood's screenwriters.

Sullivan began his career in Hollywood writing stories for Ince's two-reel films. He then progressed to full-length feature films, and his stories contributed much to the fame of stars including Dorothy Dalton, Enid Bennett, Louise Glaum and Constance Bennett.

His early films were mostly in the western genre, but also included historical dramas such as The Witch of Salem (1913) and The Battle of Gettysburg (1913), and comedies such as "The Adventures of Shorty" two-reelers from 1914 through 1917.

Sullivan's 1915 feature The Italian was one of the biggest box office hits of the year. And his screenplays for William S. Hart, including The Scourge of the Desert, The Aryan, Hell's Hinges, The Return of Draw Egan, Branding Broadway and Wagon Tracks helped make Hart one of the biggest stars of the 1910s.

Showing an ability to handle diverse topics, Sullivan also wrote screenplays involving domestic melodrama. These included The Golden Claw and a series of screenplays for silent film femme fatale, Louise Glaum, such as The Wolf Woman (described as "the greatest vampire woman of all time"), Sahara and the provocatively titled Sex (featuring Glaum performing a sensual "spider dance" dressed in a form-fitting cloak of webs).

With the outbreak of World War I, Sullivan also turned his attention to the war. In Shell 43, he told the story of English spy working behind German lines who saves the life of a German officer and is killed in a German trench by an Allied shell.

Perhaps Sullivan's most famous screenplay was Civilization, a big budget anti-war movie in which Jesus appeared on a World War I battlefield. In the film, a Germanic submarine commander refuses to follow orders to fire torpedoes at a ship carrying innocent passengers, saying he is "obeying orders -- from a Higher Power." The submarine is destroyed, and the commander's soul descends into hell, where he encounters Jesus. Jesus announces that the commander can find redemption by having Jesus occupy his body and return to the living world as a voice for peace. The commander is sentenced to death for refusing to follow orders, and at his execution, the spirit of Jesus emerges from his dead body and gives the king of the warring nation a tour of the battlefields. Jesus asks, "See here thy handiwork? Under thy reign, thy domain hath become a raging hell!" In the film's most famous scene, Jesus departs through the bloodied battlefields. The film was a popular success when it was released in 1916. In fact, the 1916 Democratic National Committee credited the film with helping to re-elect President Woodrow Wilson. However, after the entry of the United States into the war, the film was pulled from distribution.

Sullivan returned to the subject of World War I as the supervising story chief for the 1930 film adaptation of All Quiet on the Western Front.

Sullivan prided himself on tackling a diverse range of subject matters, telling an interviewer the following:

I have made all kinds and manner of pictures, none of them the work of a specialist in a certain grooved form. ... The public is fickle. The man who makes pictures for the public must be able to turn from comedy to melodrama, from psychological realism to sophisticated farce, from the big-scale popular spectacle to the cameo of emotions, sentimental drama.

By 1919, Sullivan was the best known screenwriter in Hollywood. The Los Angeles Times wrote of him:

Several years ago, when the newly-formed Triangle organization contributed a new art and finish to the motion picture, there came into great prominence C. Gardner Sullivan, a writer of fine capabilities; a careful, technical craftsman. No author having a contempt for the intellect of his audience -- and many writers of photodramas continue to hold their audiences in contempt -- could have made the success of screen authorship that C. Gardner Sullivan has.

In January 1920, Sullivan left New York for a world tour. He was given a roving commission by Ince allowing him to "leave the studio with a free mind and just browse around wherever fancy dictates; if the spirit should move him he may write a script now and then, 'just for practice,' or he may just store up a fund of mental notes for future use."

In February 1924, the Los Angeles Times reported that the number of feature films produced from the original stories or adaptations of Mr. Sullivan totaled 311 in eight years. The Times noted: "This record undoubtedly is unrivaled among screen authors. Mr. Sullivan's work is all the more remarkable because of the recognition which it has achieved for unvarying quality and variety." At that time, Sullivan described the rule he applied in the selection of a story for the screen:

Is it human, is it true to life, is it sincere? If you can conscientiously satisfy yourself on these things, you won't have to worry as to whether the public will like the story or not. If you are genuinely moved by it, you may be sure that the public will respond in like manner. ... Give the public a story that touches the heart and is true to life, and, to paraphrase Emerson, 'the world will make a beaten path to the theater box office.'

In his book about the history of American screenwriting, Marc Norman wrote that the Ince studio, where Sullivan was the lead writer, was the first to use the screenplay as the blueprint for the entire production, marking a departure from earlier productions in which the "screenplay" was simply "a one-page précis of the film's narrative." Indeed, Sullivan's scripts detailed locations, the number of actors, costumes, and even the blocking of the shoot. Norman pointed to the following excerpt from the Hell's Hinges script as an example of the directorial detail contained in Sullivan's work:

Scene L: Close-Up on Bar in Western Saloon
A group of good western types of the earlier period are drinking at the bar and talking idly -- much good fellowship prevails and every man feels at ease with his neighbor -- one of them glances off the picture and the smile fades from his face to be replaced by the strained look of worry -- the others notice the change and follow his gaze -- their face reflect his own emotions -- be sure to get over a good contrast between the easy good nature that had prevailed and the unnatural, strained silence that follows -- as they look, cut.

Once Sullivan's scripts were completed, Thomas Ince would stamp them "Produce exactly as written," leaving little to the discretion of the directors and cameramen. By setting every detail of the scene in words, Sullivan was able to "control the outcome of the film he saw in his mind's eye."

== Producer and screenwriter ==
In September 1924, Sullivan entered the production end of the business forming a new production company called C. Gardner Sullivan Productions. The company produced Cheap Kisses, a 1924 comedy drama, and If Marriage Fails, both based on screenplays written by Sullivan.

In the late 1920s, Sullivan signed on with Cecil B. DeMille as a producer. While working with DeMille, Sullivan made such films as The Yankee Clipper. In 1927, he was referred to as "the man who knows box office":

C. Gardner Sullivan, creator of 365 box-office hits, maker of 'The Yankee Clipper,' ... as well as of 'White Gold,' ... producer for the De Mille studios, whose reputation is that of 'the man who knows box office,' is the man who chose to film a story as truth rather than as 'mush for the morons' ...

With the arrival of censorship in the motion picture industry, Sullivan was an outspoken critic of the practice. In 1931, Sullivan argued publicly that censorship was impeding the presentation of satire in motion pictures. He noted that "some of the finest examples of screen writing are being rejected because their keen satire would be resented by some strata of society."

Sullivan remained active as a screenwriter in the 1930s with works including DeMille's 1938 adventure film The Buccaneer. His final film credit was the story of Jackass Mail, a 1942 western directed by Norman Z. McLeod and starring Wallace Beery.

== Personal life and death ==
Sullivan married actress Ann May on February 14, 1925, in Santa Ana. They had four children together; daughter Sheilah Dree, and sons Charles Gardner, Michael Patrick, and Timothy Reese. He was an avid golfer and crossword puzzle enthusiast.

In September 1965, Sullivan died of a heart attack at age 80 at his home in West Hollywood, California.

== Role in film history ==
In 1924, the magazine Story World selected a list of the ten individuals who had contributed the most to the advancement of the motion picture industry from the time of its inception. The list included Gardner (the only screenwriter on the list), director D.W. Griffith, actors Charlie Chaplin and Mary Pickford, Carl Laemmle (founder of Universal Studios), Charles Francis Jenkins (inventor of the motion picture projector), producer Thomas H. Ince, and art director Wilfred Buckland.

Four of Sullivan's films, The Italian (1915), Civilization (1916), Hell's Hinges (1916) and All Quiet on the Western Front (1930), have been listed in the National Film Registry.

== Filmography ==
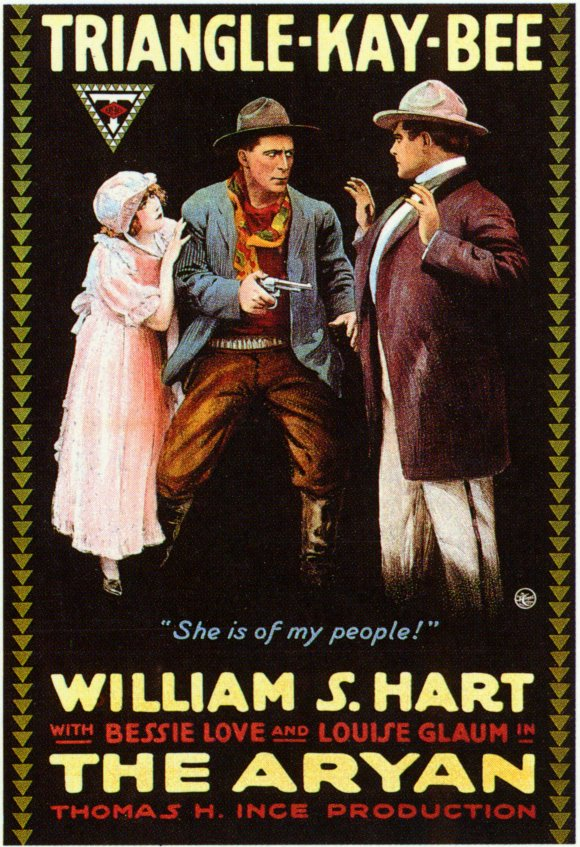
The Aryan (1915)

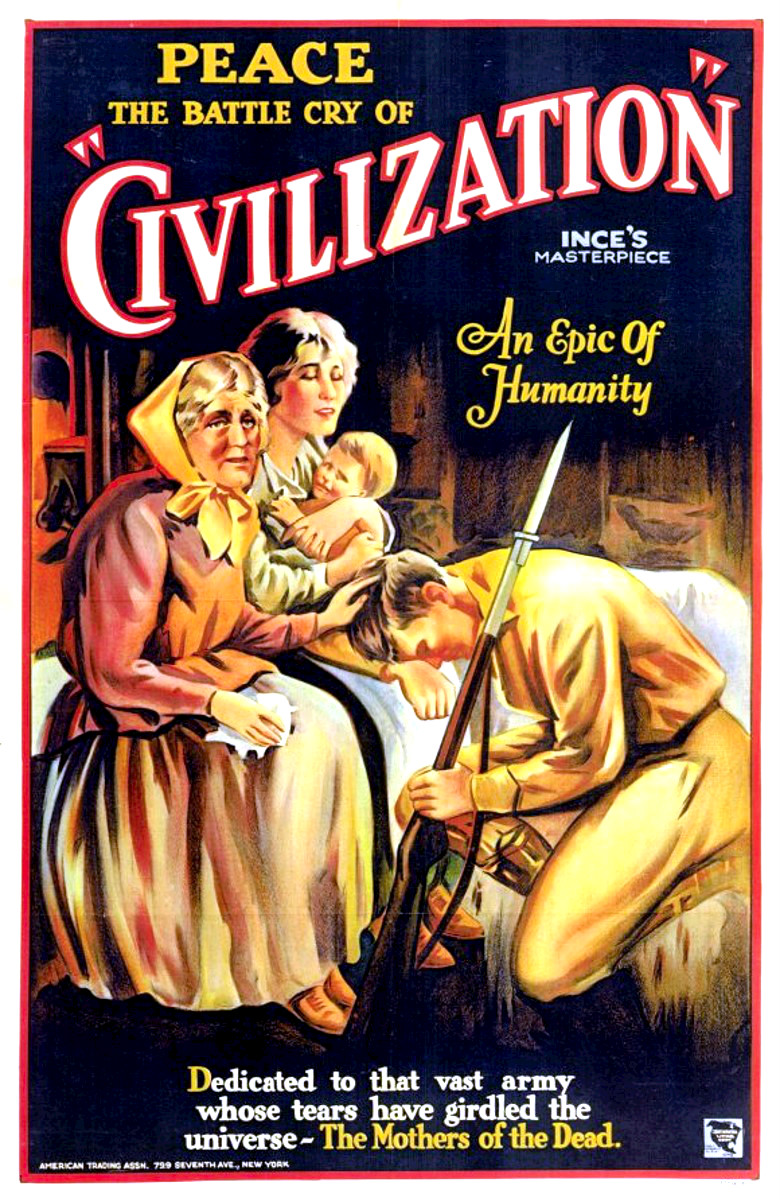
Civilization (1916)

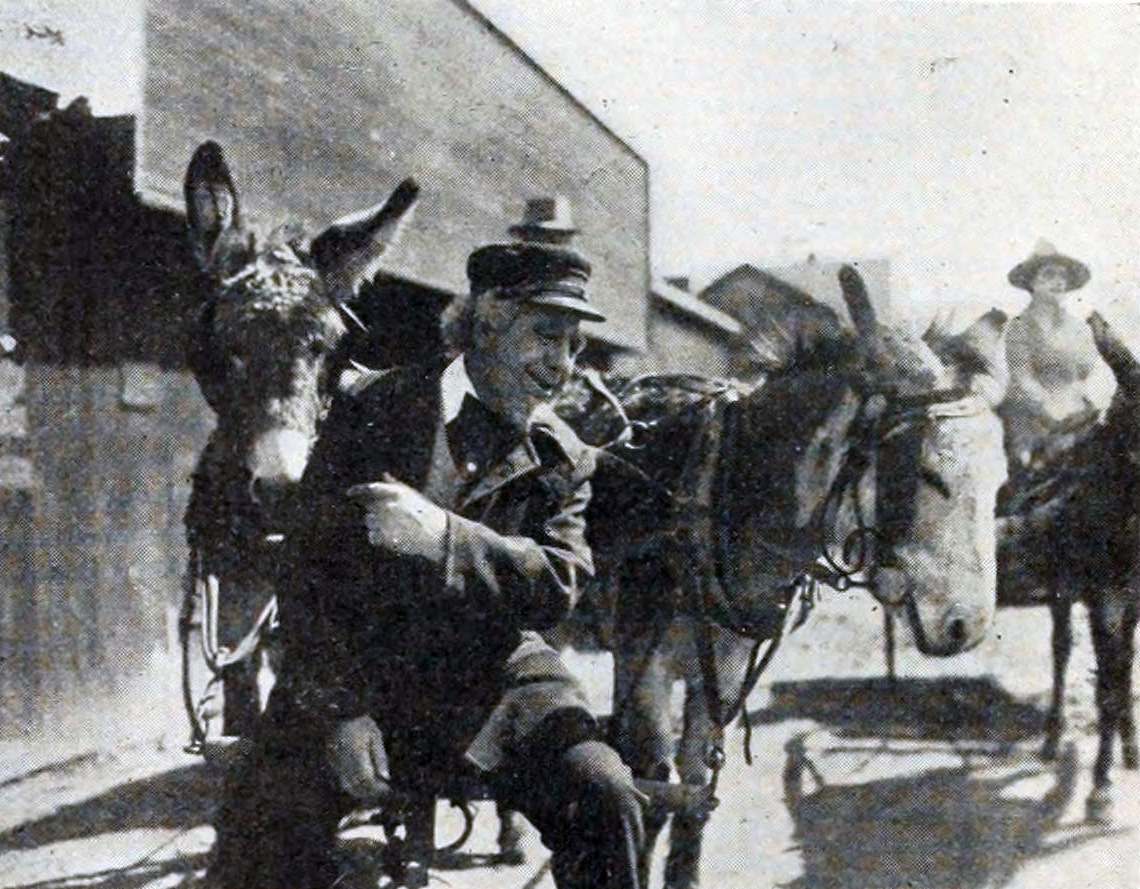
The Eye of the Night (1916)

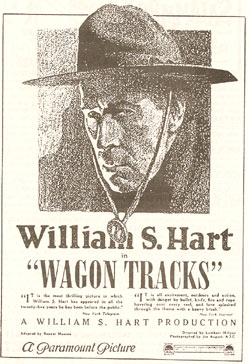
Wagon Tracks (1919)

The Silver Sheet, a studio publication promoting Thomas Ince Productions, cover illustration of Playing with Souls by Clara Longworth de Chambrun

1. Her Polished Family (1912) - the first story sold by Sullivan to Edison
2. When Lee Surrenders (1912) (scenario)
3. The Altar of Death (West, 1912) (co-director, writer with T. Ince)
4. The Army Surgeon (F. Ford, 1912) (writer)
5. The Invaders (F. Ford and T. Ince, 1912) (uncredited)
6. The Dead Pay (1912) (scenario)
7. A Shadow of the Past (T. Ince, 1913) (scenario)
8. Days of '49 (T. Ince, 1913) (scenario)
9. The Witch of Salem (West, 1913) (writer)
10. Will o' the Wisp (1913) (writer)
11. The Reaping (1913) (story)
12. The Seal of Silence (1913) (scenario)
13. The Boomerange (1913) (scenario)
14. The Battle of Gettysburg (T. Incee, 1914) (titles)
15. The Telltale Hatband (1913) (scenario)
16. The Paymaster's Son (1913) (scenario)
17. The Bargain (Barker, 1914)
18. The Wrath of the Gods (1914) (writer)
19. One of the Discarded (1914) (writer)
20. Two-Gun Hicks (Hart, 1914) (writer)
21. In the Sage Brush Country (1914) (scenario, story)
22. The Hour of Reckoning (1914) (written by)
23. Shorty and the Fortune Teller (1914) (story)
24. Shorty and Sherlock Holmes (1914)
25. Mother of the Shadows (Osborne, 1914)
26. Destiny's Night (1914)
27. Not of the Flock (Sidney, 1914) (producer)
28. Markia, aka The Fall of Carthage (1914)
29. The City of Darkness (1914)
30. Breed o' the North (1914) (writer)
31. Willie (1914) (scenario)
32. The Worth of a Life (1914) (story)
33. The World of His People (1914) (story)
34. Satan McAllister's Heir (1915) (writer)
35. The Last of the Line (T. Ince, 1915) (scenario)
36. The Roughneck (Hart and Smith, 1915) (writer)
37. The Ruse (Hart and Smith, 1915) (writer)
38. Pinto Ben (Hart, 1915)
39. Mr. 'Silent' Haskins (1915) (writer)
40. The Cross of Fire (1915) (written by)
41. In the Land of the Otter (1915) (written by)
42. The Grudge (1915) (writer)
43. The Darkening Trail (1915) (writer)
44. On the Night Stage (Barker, 1915) (story)
45. Winning Back (1915) (scenario)
46. On the High Seas (1915)
47. The Shoal Light (1915)
48. The Tools of Providence (1915) (scenario)
49. The Floating Death (1915) (scenario)
50. The Reward (scenario)
51. Hostage of the North (1915)
52. The Man from Nowhere, aka The Silent Stranger (1915) (scenario, story for The Silent Stranger)
53. The Cup of Life (West, 1915) (writer)
54. The Painted Soul (Sidney, 1915) (writer)
55. The Iron Strain (Barker, 1915) (scenario)
56. The Man Who Went Out (1915)
57. Matrimony (Sidney, 1915) (scenario)
58. In the Switch Tower (1915) (scenario)
59. The Girl Who Might Have Been (1915) (writer)
60. The Man from Oregon (1915) (scenario)
61. The Toast of Death (1915) (scenario)
62. The Mating (1915) (scenario)
63. Between Men (1915) (screenplay, story)
64. The Winged Idol (1915) (scenario)
65. The Golden Claw (Barker, 1915) (scenario)
66. The Forbidden Adventure (1915) (scenario)
67. The Edge of the Abyss (1915) (scenario)
68. The Scourge of the Desert (1915) (writer)
69. The Italian (Barker, 1915) (story) - ranked #15 at the box office in 1915
70. The Valley of Hate (1915)
71. The Coward (Barker, 1915)
72. The Aryan (Hart and Smith, 1915) (screenplay, story)
73. Peggy (Giblyn, 1915) (writer)
74. The Beckoning Flame (1916) (scenario)
75. The Conqueror (Barker, 1916) (scenario)
76. Honor's Altar (1916) (scenario)
77. The Last Act (1916) (scenario)
78. The Moral Fabric (1916) (scenario)
79. The Stepping Stone (Barker, 1916) (scenario)
80. Civilization's Child (Giblyn, 1916) (writer)
81. The No-Good Guy (Edwards, 1916) (scenario)
82. The Dividend (1916) (writer)
83. The Beggar of Cawnpore (Swickard, 1916) (scenario)
84. Not My Sister (Giblyn, 1916) (writer)
85. The Market of Vain Desire (Barker, 1916) (story)
86. The Bugle Call (Barker, 1916) (scenario)
87. The Eye of the Night (Edwards, 1916) (writer)
88. The Payment (West, 1916) (scenario)
89. Home (1916) (scenario)
90. A Corner in Colleens (Miller, 1916) (scenario)
91. The Dawn Maker (Hart, 1916) (screenplay, story)
92. Plain Jane (Miller, 1916) (scenario)
93. The Criminal (Barker, 1916) (scenario)
94. The Corner (1916) (screenplay, story)
95. Shell 43 (Barker, 1916) (writer)
96. Hell's Hinges (Hart and Swickard, 1916) (screenplay, story)
97. The Green Swamp (Sidney, 1916) (writer)
98. Civilization (T. Ince, 1916) (writer)
99. The Wolf Woman (1916) (scenario)
100. The Return of Draw Egan (Hart, 1916) (screenplay, story)
101. The Thoroughbred (Bartlett, 1916) (scenario)
102. Three of Many (1917) (screenplay, story)
103. The Iced Bullet (Barker, 1917) (scenario)
104. The Pinch Hitter (1917) (scenario)
105. Happiness (Barker, 1917) (writer)
106. The Zeppelin's Last Raid (1917)
107. The Hater of Men (1917) (scenario)
108. The Girl, Glory (1917) (scenario)
109. The Crab (1917) (scenario)
110. Those Who Pay (Wells, 1918) (scenario)
111. Without Honor (1918) (story)
112. Keys of the Righteous (1918) (screenplay, story)
113. Love Me (Neill, 1918) (scenario)
114. The Cast-Off (1918) (scenario)
115. Selfish Yates (Hart, 1917) (screenplay, story)
116. Shark Monroe (Hart, 1918) (screenplay, story)
117. Vive la France! (1918) (scenario)
118. The Border Wireless (Hart, 1918) (writer)
119. When Do We Eat? (1918) (screenplay, story)
120. Branding Broadway (Hart, 1918) (writer)
121. Naughty, Naughty (Storm, 1918) (story)
122. The Vamp (Storm, 1918)
123. The Poppy Girl's Husband (Hart and Hillyer, 1919) (scenario)
124. Stepping Out (Niblo, 1919)
125. The Market of Souls (De Grasse, 1919)
126. John Petticoats (Hillyer, 1919) (scenario, story)
127. Wagon Tracks (Hillyer, 1919) (screenplay, story)
128. Happy Though Married (Niblo, 1919) (writer)
129. The Haunted Bedroom (Niblo, 1919) (screenplay, story)
130. Other Men's Wives (Schertzinger, 1919) (screenplay, story)
131. Sahara (Rosson, 1919) (story, scenario)
132. The Virtuous Thief (Niblo, 1919) (screenplay, story)
133. Stepping Out (1919) (scenario, story)
134. Dangerous Hours (Niblo, 1919) (scenario)
135. The Lady of Red Butte (1919) (screenplay, story)
136. The Woman in the Suitcase (1920) (screenplay, story)
137. Love Madness (Henabery, 1920) (screenplay, story)
138. Sex (Niblo, 1920) (writer)
139. The False Road (Niblo, 1920) (screenplay, story)
140. Hairpins (Niblo, 1920) (screenplay, story)
141. Good Women (Gasnier, 1921) (screenplay, story)
142. Mother O' Mine (Niblo, 1921) (adaptation)
143. Greater Than Love (Niblo, 1921) (writer)
144. Hail the Woman (Wray, 1921) (writer)
145. White Hands (Hillyer, 1922) (story)
146. Human Wreckage (Wray, 1923) (writer)
147. Soul of the Beast (Wray, 1923) (story)
148. Dulcy (S. Franklin, 1923) (writer)
149. The Dangerous Maid (Heerman, 1923) (writer)
150. Long Live the King (Schertzinger, 1923) (adaptation)
151. Strangers of the Night (Niblo, 1923) (adaptation)
152. The Goldfish (Storm, 1924) (writer)
153. The Marriage Cheat (Wray, 1924) (adaptation)
154. Wandering Husbands (Beaudine, 1924) (screenplay, story)
155. The House of Youth (R. Ince, 1924) (writer)
156. The Only Woman (Olcott, 1924) (writer)
157. Idle Tongues (Hillyer, 1924) (adaptation)
158. The Mirage (Archainbaud, 1924) (adaptation)
159. Dynamite Smith (R. Ince, 1924) (screenplay, story)
160. Cheap Kisses (R. Ince and Tate, 1925) (screenplay, story, producer)
161. The Monster (West, 1925) (titles)
162. Playing with Souls (R. Ince, 1925) (adaptation)
163. The Pinch Hitter (1925) (story)
164. Wild Justice (C. Franklin, 1925) (screenplay, story)
165. Tumbleweeds (Baggot, 1925) (adaptation)
166. If Marriage Fails (J. Ince, 1926) (screenplay, story)
167. Three Faces East (Julian, 1926) (adaptation)
168. Bachelor Brides (Howard, 1926) (adaptation and scenario)
169. Sparrows (Beaudine, 1926) (adaptation)
170. Gigolo (Howard, 1926) (supervising story editor)
171. Her Man o' War (1926) (supervisor)
172. The Clinging Vine (1926) (presenter)
173. Corporal Kate (1926) (supervisor)
174. The Bugle Call (Sedgwick, 1927) (writer)
175. Turkish Delight (1927) (supervisor)
176. Vanity (supervisor)
177. The Yankee Clipper (1927) (producer)
178. White Gold (1927) (producer)
179. Tempest (Taylor, 1928) (writer)
180. The Woman Disputed (H. King and Taylor, 1928) (screenplay)
181. Sadie Thompson (Walsh, 1928) (titles, editor)
182. Alibi (West, 1929) (screenplay)
183. The Locked Door (Fitzmaurice, 1929) (screen adaptation)
184. All Quiet on the Western Front (1930) (supervising story chief)
185. What Men Want (1930) (supervising story editor)
186. Hell's Heroes (1930) (chief story supervisor)
187. The Cuban Love Song (Van Dyke, 1931) (screenplay)
188. Huddle (Wood, 1932) (dialogue continuity)
189. Strange Interlude (Strange Interval) (Leonard, 1932) (dialogue continuity)
190. Skyscraper Souls (Selwyn, 1932) (adaptation)
191. Men Must Fight (Selwyn, 1933) (writer)
192. Father Brown, Detective (Sedgwick, 1934) (writer)
193. Car 99 (Barton, 1935) (screenplay)
194. The Awakening of Jim Burke (1935) (story, production supervisor)
195. Three Live Ghosts (Humberstone, 1936) (screenplay)
196. The Robin Hood of El Dorado (1936) (uncredited)
197. The Buccaneer (DeMille, 1938) (screenplay)
198. Union Pacific (DeMille, 1939) (screenplay)
199. North West Mounted Police (DeMille, 1940) (screenplay)
200. Jackass Mail (McLeod, 1942) (story)
201. The Buccaneer (1958) (based on Sullivan's 1938 screenplay)
