= Jay Hunt (director) =

American film director (1855–1932)

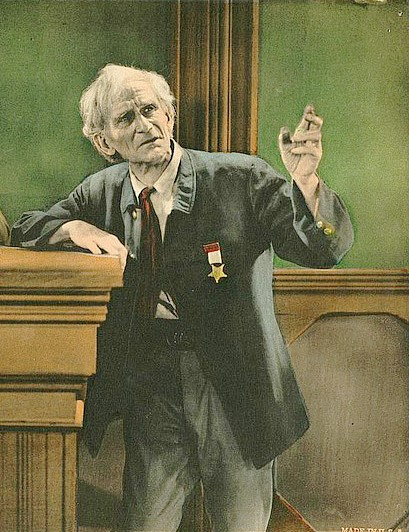
- Hunt in Lightnin' (1925)
- Born: August 4, 1855; Philadelphia, Pennsylvania, U.S.
- Died: November 18, 1932 (aged 77); Los Angeles, California, U.S.
- Years active: 1911–1931

Jay Hunt (August 4, 1855 – November 18, 1932) was an American film director and actor. He directed nearly 70 films between 1911 and 1919. He continued his career as an actor until 1931. The White Squaw, a 1920 film directed by Hunt, was preserved by the Academy Film Archive in 2011.

== Formative years ==
Born in Philadelphia, Pennsylvania on August 4, 1855, Hunt began his acting career at the Arch Street Theatre in that city, where he worked for Louisa Lane Drew.

== Career ==
According to the Hollywood Citizen-News, during his theatrical career, Hunt "had been associated with Otis Skinner, Edwin Booth, Mme. Modjecka, the Kiralfy Bros., Maud Granger, E. H. Sothern and was for 12 years director of the Bowdoyn Square Theater at Boston, Mass."

== Death ==
Following his death in Los Angeles, California on November 18, 1932, funeral services were held from him at a funeral home in that city. His former theatre company, Troupers, Inc., arranged and conducted his memorial. His widow, Leah Hunt, then brought his remains back to the East Coast when she relocated to East Orange, New Jersey.

== Selected filmography ==
- Star of the North (1914)
- The Man Who Went Out (1915)
- Civilization (1916)
- The Black Sheep of the Family (1916)
- The Promise (1917)
- My Lady Robin Hood (1919) - directed
- Yankee Speed (1924)
- Wanted by the Law (1924)
- Lightnin' (1925)
- Counsel for the Defense (1925)
- The Gentle Cyclone (1926)
- A Man Four-Square (1926)
- Men of the Night (1926)
- 3 Bad Men (1926)
- The Golden Web (1926)
- The Harvester (1927)
- The Overland Stage (1927)
- Captain Salvation (1927)
- The Poor Millionaire (1930)
- The Cheyenne Cyclone (1931)
