= The Witch of Salem =

- Directed by: Raymond B. West
- Written by: C. Gardner Sullivan
- Produced by: Thomas H. Ince
- Starring: Charles Ray; Clara Williams
- Production company: Domino Film Company
- Distributed by: Mutual Film
- Release date: November 20, 1913
- Running time: 2 reels
- Country: United States
- Languages: Silent; English intertitles

The Witch of Salem is a 1913 American silent short drama film directed by Raymond B. West and produced by Thomas H. Ince. The films stars Clara Williams and Charles Ray.

== Plot ==
Set in Salem, Massachusetts during the 17th century, the film tells the story a beautiful orphan girl named Prudence. Prudence is beloved by Old Hastings's son John. John must try to save Prudence's life when she is convicted of practicing witchcraft and is sentenced to being burned at the stake.
