= Shell 43 =

1916 film by Reginald Barker

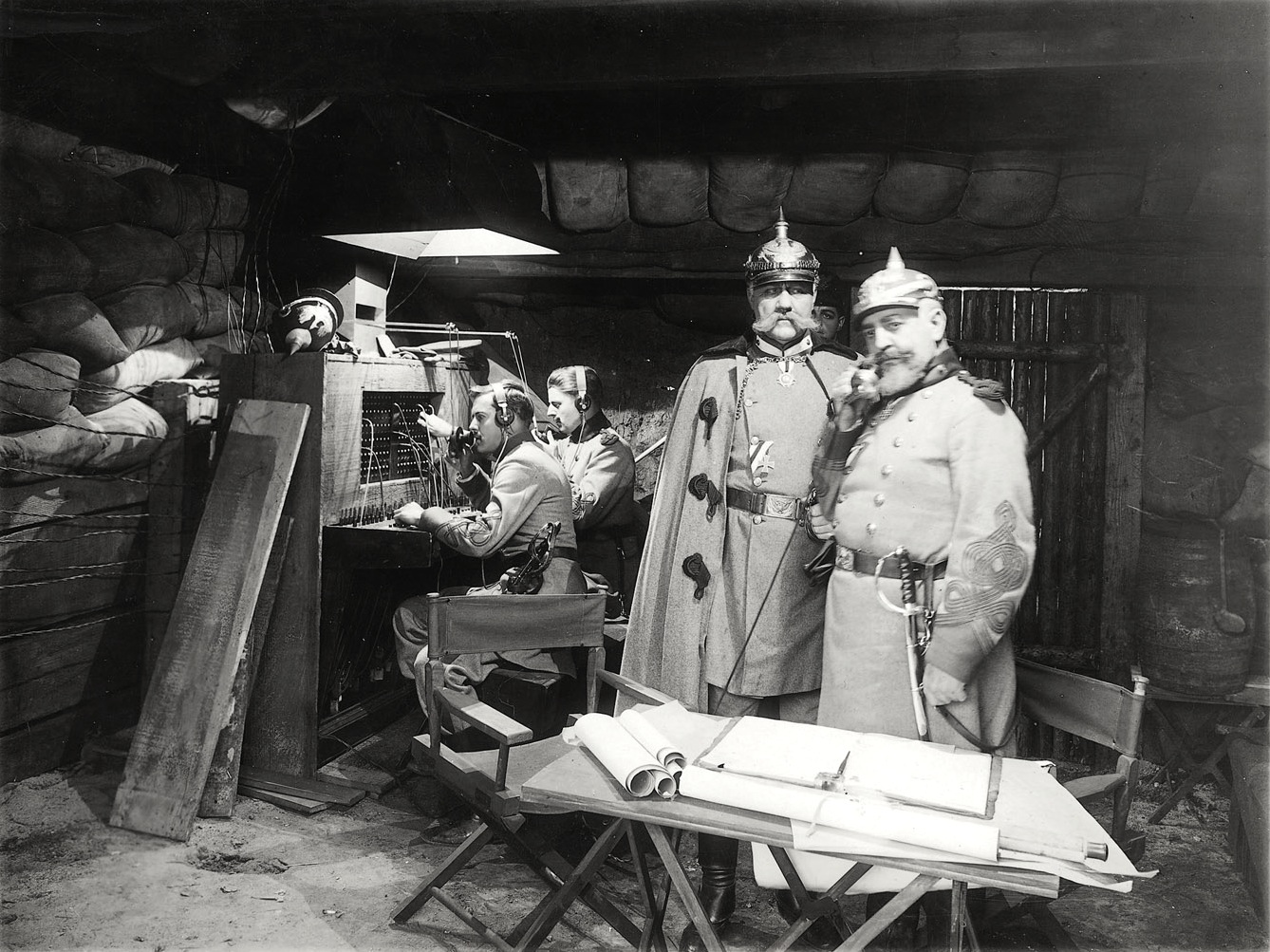
- Directed by: Reginald Barker
- Screenplay by: C. Gardner Sullivan
- Story by: Edward Sloman
- Produced by: Thomas H. Ince
- Starring: H.B. Warner; Enid Markey; John Gilbert
- Production company: Kay-Bee Pictures
- Distributed by: Triangle Film Corporation
- Release date: August 13, 1916 (United States)
- Running time: 50 minutes
- Country: United States
- Languages: Silent film English intertitles

Shell 43 is a 1916 American silent war film written by C. Gardner Sullivan, from a story by Edward Sloman, and starring H.B. Warner, Enid Markey, and John Gilbert.

== Plot ==
An English spy works behind German lines during World War I. He saves the life of a German officer and is killed in a German trench by an Allied shell.

== Preservation ==
With no prints of Shell 43 located in any film archives, it is considered a lost film.
