= The Man Who Went Out =

- Directed by: Jay Hunt
- Written by: C. Gardner Sullivan
- Produced by: Domino Film Company; Thomas H. Ince
- Starring: George Fisher
- Distributed by: Mutual Film
- Release date: July 22, 1915
- Running time: short
- Country: USA

The Man Who Went Out is a 1915 silent short film directed by Jay Hunt. It was released by Mutual Film.

== Plot ==
The film is a drama about frontier life.

== Cast ==
- Herschel Mayall - Captain Edwin Graham
- Roy Laidlaw - Colonel Graham, Edwin's Uncle
- George Fisher - Lieutenant James Graham - Edwin's son
- Margaret Thompson - Elsie
