= The Beggar of Cawnpore =

1916 film by Charles Swickard

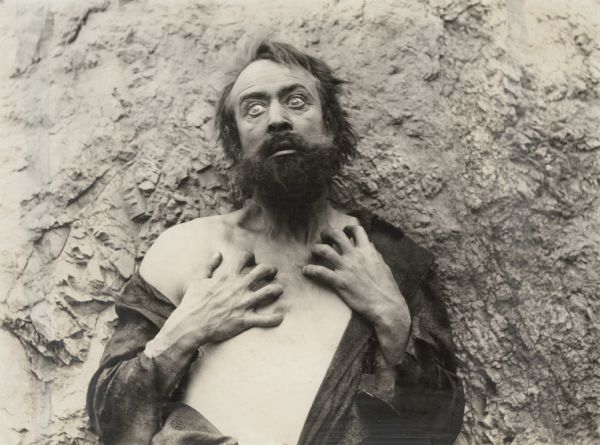
- Directed by: Charles Swickard
- Written by: C. Gardner Sullivan
- Produced by: Thomas H. Ince
- Starring: H. B. Warner; Lola May; Wyndham Standing
- Cinematography: Clyde De Vinna
- Production companies: Kay-Bee Pictures; New York Motion Picture
- Distributed by: Triangle Distributing
- Release date: April 30, 1916
- Running time: 60 minutes
- Country: United States
- Languages: Silent; English intertitles

The Beggar of Cawnpore is a 1916 American silent drama film directed by Charles Swickard and starring H. B. Warner, Lola May and Wyndham Standing. It is set against the backdrop of the 1857 Indian Mutiny.

== Cast ==
- H. B. Warner as Dr. Robert Lowndes
- Lola May as Betty Archer
- Wyndham Standing as Capt. Guy Douglas
- Alfred Hollingsworth as Mulhar Rao
- Harold Entwistle as Col. Archer
- Wedgwood Nowell as Werner, the Engineer

== Preservation status ==
A 28 mm print is preserved by George Eastman House and another print is held by the National Archives of Canada.

== Bibliography ==
- Taves, Brian. Thomas Ince: Hollywood's Independent Pioneer. University Press of Kentucky, 2012.
