= The Dawn Maker =

1916 film

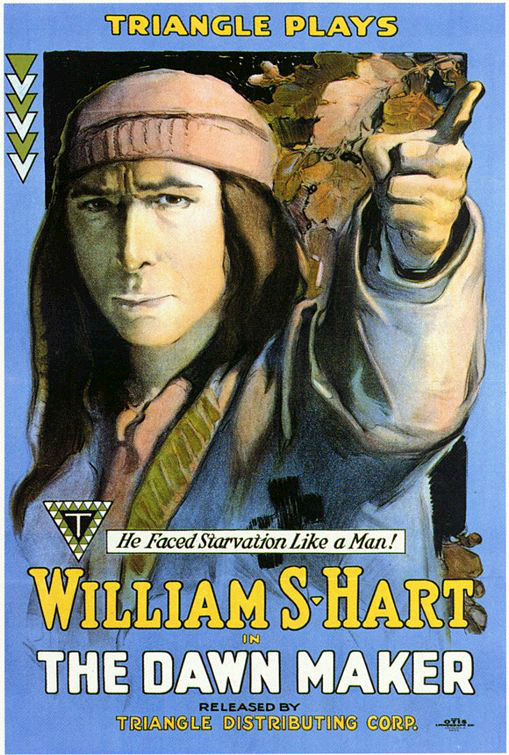
- Film poster
- Directed by: William S. Hart
- Written by: C. Gardner Sullivan (story & scenario)
- Produced by: Thomas H. Ince
- Starring: William S. Hart
- Cinematography: Joseph H. August
- Distributed by: Triangle Film Corporation
- Release date: September 24, 1916
- Running time: 50 minutes
- Country: United States
- Languages: Silent; English intertitles

The Dawn Maker is a lost 1916 silent film western directed by and starring William S. Hart and produced by Thomas H. Ince. Triangle Pictures distributed.

== Cast ==
- William S. Hart - Joe Elk
- Blanche White - Alice McRae
- William Desmond - Bruce Smithson
- J. Frank Burke - Walter McRae
- Joy Goodboy - Chief Troubled Thunder
