= Lola May =

American actress (May Purman; 1889–1971)

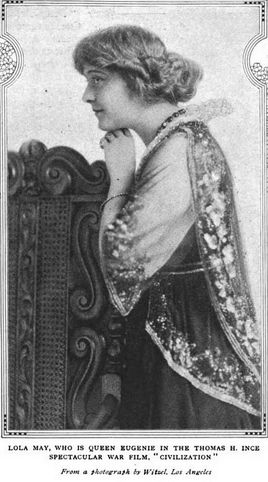
- May in 1916 publication
- Born: May Purman; March 15, 1889; North Dakota, U.S.
- Died: February 4, 1971 (aged 81); Los Angeles, California, U.S.
- Occupation: Actress
- Years active: 1914–1918 (film)

Lola May (born May Purman; 1889–1971) was an American silent film and stage actress.

== Life ==
May was born in North Dakota. She was a stage actress and appeared in seven films during the silent era including the historical drama The Beggar of Cawnpore. She appeared in the 1908-1909 Broadway hit A Gentleman from Mississippi. Her other Broadway plays included The Lure (1913), Just Like John (1912), and An Old New Yorker (1911).

Beginning in November 1913, May faced a lawsuit from Marie Crandell, who said that her estranged husband, Derby Crandell, had bought gifts for May and had dined with her. Mrs. Crandell said "My husband was a model husband and we were very happy until this other woman came between us." The suit asked for $50,000 damages. The suit was dismissed on March 21, 1914, after Mrs. Crandell "failed to file a bill of particulars".

In 1916 she appeared in Thomas H. Ince's anti-war film Civilization as Queen Eugenie. The film reputedly cost $1 million to make.

== Partial filmography ==
- The Lure (1914)
- The Beggar of Cawnpore (1916)
- The Heart of Nora Flynn (1916)
- The Green Swamp (1916)
- Civilization (1916)

== Bibliography ==
- George A. Katchmer. A Biographical Dictionary of Silent Film Western Actors and Actresses. McFarland, 2002.
