= Counsel for the Defense =

1925 film by Burton L. King

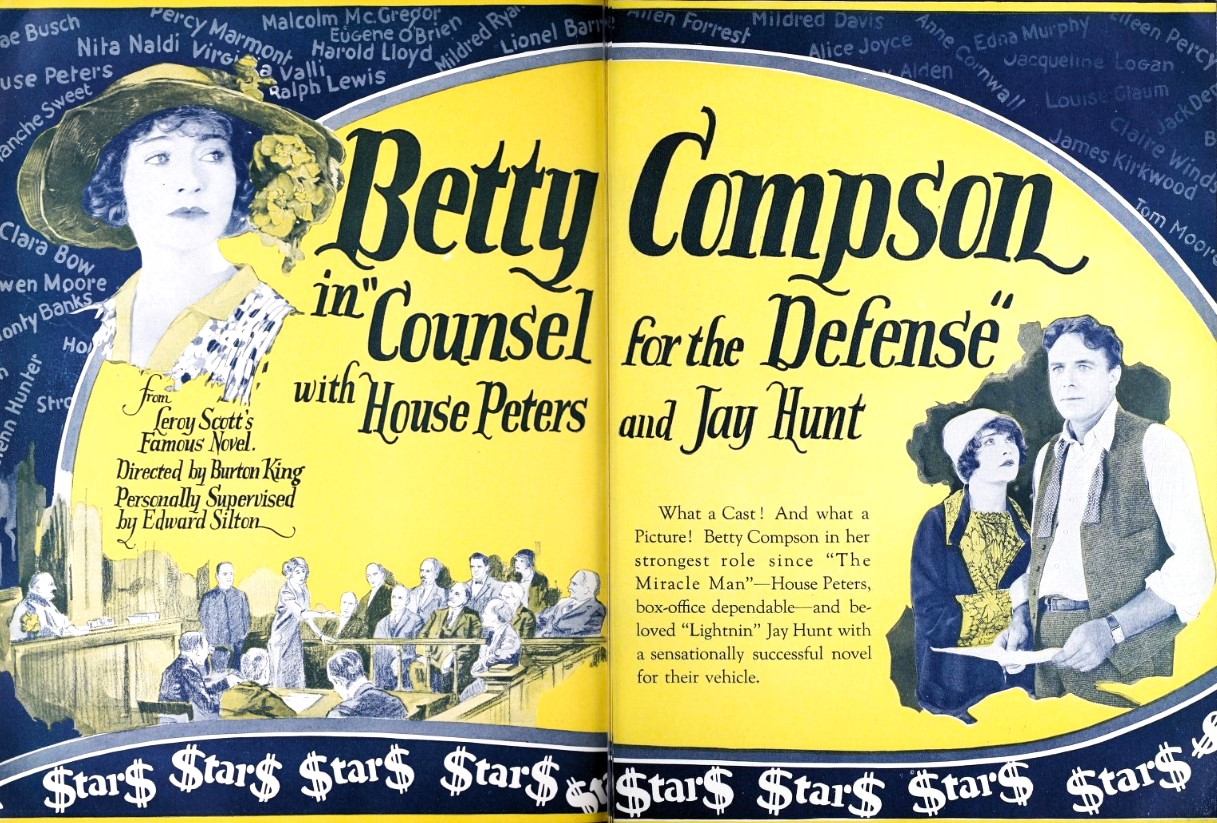
- Trade advertisement
- Directed by: Burton L. King
- Written by: Arthur Hoerl
- Screenplay by: Arthur Hoerl
- Based on: Counsel for the Defense by Leroy Scott
- Produced by: Edward S. Silton
- Starring: Jay Hunt; House Peters; Betty Compson
- Cinematography: Ned Van Buren; George Porter
- Production company: Burton King Productions
- Distributed by: Associated Exhibitors
- Release date: December 6, 1925
- Running time: 7 reels
- Country: United States
- Language: Silent (English intertitles)

Counsel for the Defense is a 1925 American silent drama film directed by Burton L. King and starring Jay Hunt, Betty Compson, and House Peters. It is based on the 1912 novel of the same name by Leroy Scott.

== Plot ==
As described in a film magazine review, two men who wish to give the town's waterworks into the hands of a private company are opposed by Doc West, an old doctor. To clear the path for their scheme, they have the doctor arrested and charged with bribery. No local lawyer wishes to oppose the powerful schemers, so the doctor's daughter Katherine defends him. He loses his case, but the young woman unearths evidence against his enemies, clears his name, and has the others brought to justice.

== Cast ==
- Jay Hunt as Doc West
- Betty Compson as Katherine West
- House Peters as Arnold Bruce
- Rockliffe Fellowes as Harrison Blake
- Emmett King as Harvey Sherman
- Bernard Randall as Stephen Marcy
- George MacDonald as Hosea Hollingsworth
- William Conklin as Thomas Burke
- Joan Standing as Printer's Devil

== Preservation ==
Counsel for the Defense is currently presumed lost. In February of 2021, the film was cited by the National Film Preservation Board on their Lost U.S. Silent Feature Films list.
