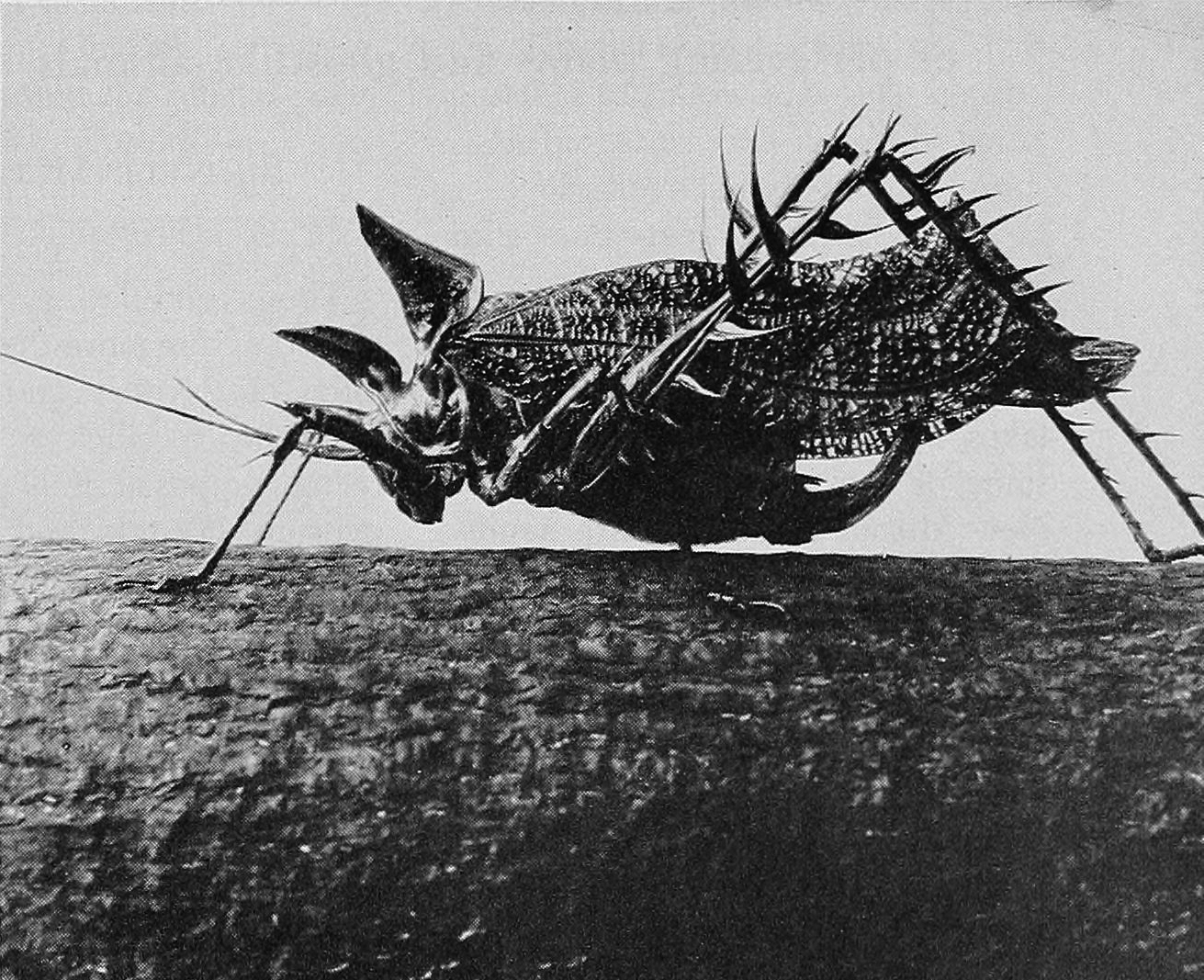

Scientific classification
- Domain: Eukaryota
- Kingdom: Animalia
- Phylum: Arthropoda
- Class: Insecta
- Order: Orthoptera
- Suborder: Ensifera
- Family: Tettigoniidae
- Subfamily: Phaneropterinae
- Genus: Markia
- Species: M. hystrix

Binomial name
- Markia hystrix (Westwood, 1844)

= Markia hystrix =

Species of cricket-like animal

Markia hystrix is a species of katydid in the subfamily Phaneropterinae. It occurs in highlands of western and central Colombia and in southern Panama, up to an altitude of at least 1,800 m (5,900 ft); although sometimes reported from elsewhere, this is due to confusion with other species in the genus Markia, all of which are known as lichen katydids. These highly spiny katydids are very well camouflaged, with colors and patterns that closely resemble the Usnea lichen upon which they live and feed. Adult M. hystrix have a length of about 4.5–5 cm (1.8–2.0 in) and show some variation in color depending on the exact color of the lichen in a region.
