= Civilization (film) =

1916 American film

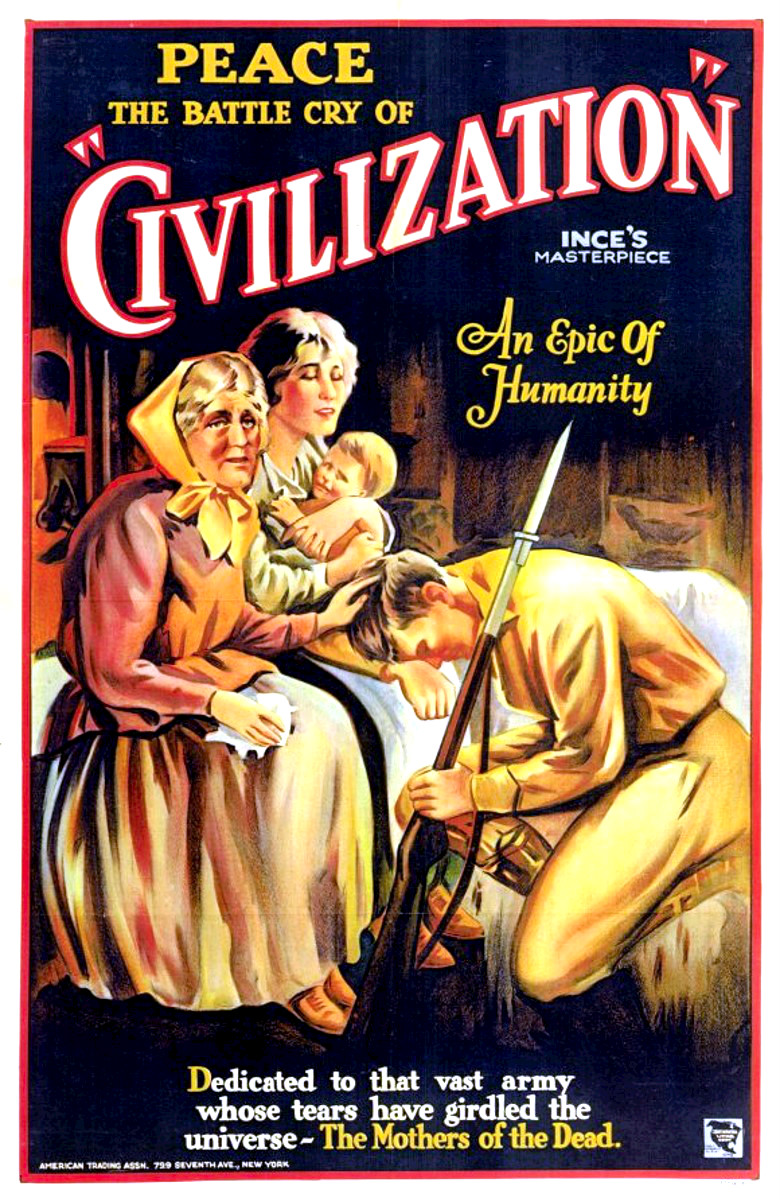
- Directed by: Reginald Barker; Thomas H. Ince; Raymond B. West
- Screenplay by: C. Gardner Sullivan; Edward Sloman
- Story by: C. Gardner Sullivan
- Produced by: Thomas H. Ince
- Starring: Howard C. Hickman; Enid Markey; George Fisher; Herschel Mayall
- Cinematography: Joseph H. August; Dal Clawson; Clyde De Vinna; Otis M. Gove; Devereaux Jennings; Charles E. Kaufman; Robert Newhard; Irvin Willat
- Edited by: Thomas H. Ince; Hal C. Kern; LeRoy Stone; Irvin Willat
- Music by: Hugo Riesenfeld; Victor Schertzinger
- Distributed by: Triangle Film Corporation
- Release date: June 2, 1916
- Running time: 88 min.
- Country: United States
- Languages: Silent film English intertitles

Civilization is a 1916 American pacifist drama film produced by Thomas H. Ince, written by C. Gardner Sullivan and Edward Sloman, and directed by Ince, Reginald Barker and Raymond B. West. The story involves a submarine commander who refuses to fire at a civilian ocean liner supposedly carrying ammunition for his country's enemies. The film was a big-budget spectacle that was compared to both The Birth of a Nation and the paintings of Jean-François Millet. The film was a popular success and was credited by the Democratic National Committee with helping to re-elect Woodrow Wilson as the U.S. president in 1916. The film was one of the early movies to depict Jesus Christ as a character, leading some to criticize the depiction as in "poor taste."

Civilization is sometimes viewed as one of the first anti-war films. In 1999, it was selected for preservation in the United States National Film Registry by the Library of Congress as being "culturally, historically, or aesthetically significant".

== Prologue ==
The film opened with a lengthy prologue. In some theaters, the prologue was performed by live actors and an orchestra. It included music composed by Victor Schertzinger and depicted a peaceful country home, with hills in the distance, a stream and clouds floating peacefully through the sky. Suddenly, the boom of a cannon is heard, artillery guns belch fire, and a Zeppelin flies over the city dropping bombs. In the smoke, "Civilization" is depicted kneeling pleadingly at the feet of a menacing "God of War." Soldiers are seen retreating before deadly gas. Against these scenes, the film's title cards express the film's anti-war message, concluding with the following comments:

Today, the great sorrowful eyes of this same Son of God gaze down upon blackened fields, where the mangled bodies of men are strewn as grains of wheat, upon flaming shattered hamlets and stricken firesides. As He listens to the screaming of the shells, the crashing of monstrous guns, all the ghastly symphony of the reddest war mankind has ever known, His heart must recognize the bitter truth in the statement of one of the world's foremost educators— That in nineteen centuries Civilization has failed to accept honestly the teachings of Jesus Christ. This is an allegorical story of a war that has laughed at the world's flaunting boast of a higher progress. It does not concern itself as to which side is in the right or wrong, but deals with those ranks which are paying, the grim penalty—the ranks of Humanity. If the awful trail of battle stretches vividly through the scenes of the narrative, it is in the hope that a shocked and appalled world may henceforth devote itself more earnestly in the cause of peace. Let our Civilization not be a mockery of our cherished ideals, but rather a synonym of that glorious work—Humanity. Dedicated to that vast, pitiful army whose tears have girdled the universe—the mothers of the dead.

== Plot ==
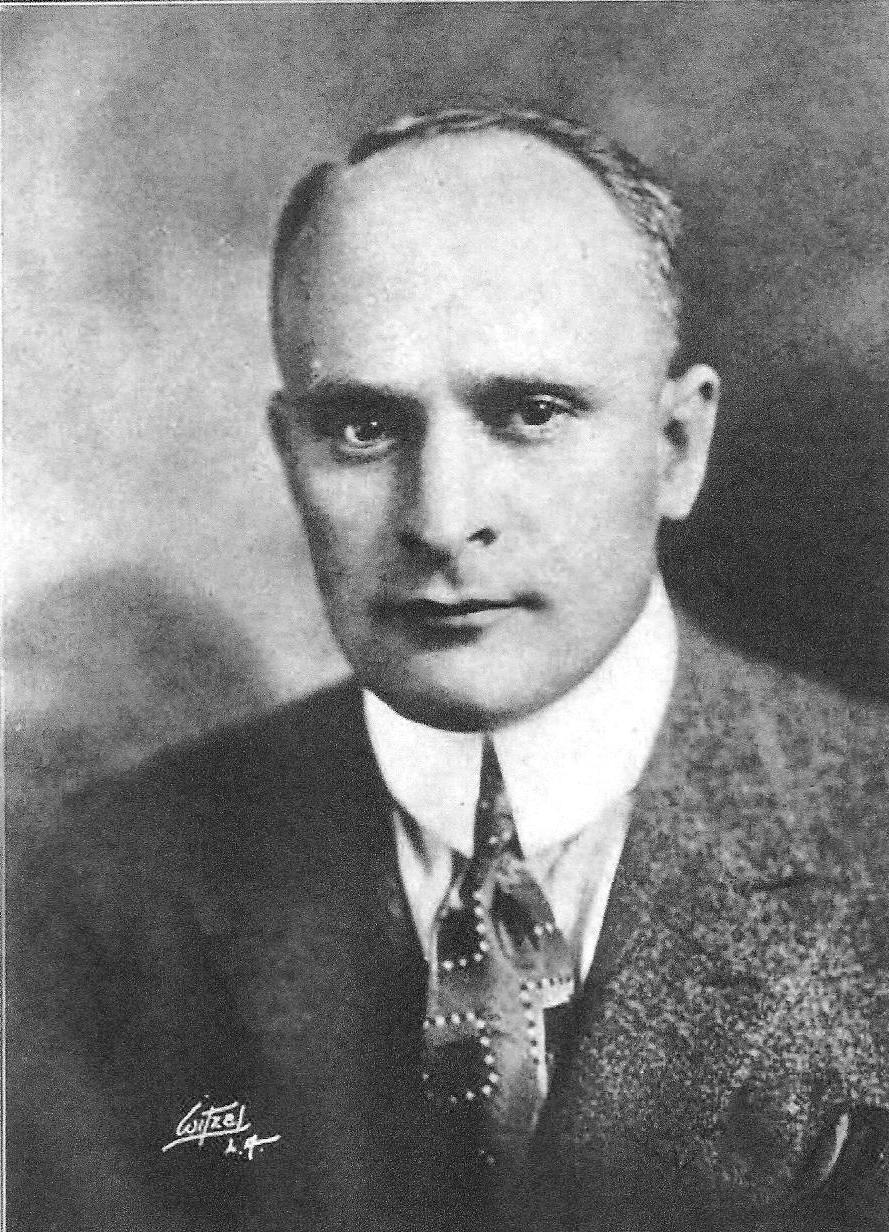
C. Gardner Sullivan wrote the initial outline for Civilization on Easter Sunday 1915.

The film opens with the outbreak of a war in the previously peaceful kingdom of Wredpryd. Count Ferdinand is the inventor of a new submarine who is assigned to command the new ship in battle. The King of Wredpryd orders the Count to sink the "ProPatria" ("for my country"), a civilian ship that is believed to be carrying munitions as well as civilian passengers. In his mind's eye, the Count sees a vision of what would happen if he sent a torpedo crashing into the liner, and he recoils. He refuses to follow his orders, saying he is "obeying orders -- from a Higher Power." Realizing his crew will carry out the orders, the Count fights with the crew and blows up his submarine, sending it to the bottom of the sea.

The Count's soul descends into purgatory, where he encounters Jesus. Jesus announces that the Count can find redemption by returning to the living world as a voice for peace. Jesus tells the Count "Peace to thee, child, for in thy love for humanity is thy redemption. In thy earthly body will I return, and with thy voice plead for peace. Much evil is being wrought in my name."

The Count returns to life and is stoned and reviled by his countrymen. He is put on trial by the king, a modern Pontius Pilate, and is sentenced to death. Five thousand women gather at the palace singing a song of peace and pleading with the king to end the war. The mothers' plea inspires the king to visit the cell of the condemned Count. The Count is found dead in his cell, and Jesus emerges from the Count's body and takes the king on a tour of the battlefields. Jesus asks "See here thy handiwork? Under thy reign, thy domain hath become a raging hell!" In the film's most famous scene, Jesus walks through the battlefields amid the carnage of war.

The signing of a peace treaty follows, and the closing scenes depicts the happiness in store for the returning soldiers.

Civilization (1916)

== Production ==
Civilization was a big budget spectacle from Thomas H. Ince. It was in production for nearly a year and advertised to have cost $1,000,000 to make but actually cost only $100,000 and returned $800,000.

C. Gardner Sullivan, The film's screenwriter, said he received the inspiration for the film on Easter Sunday morning in 1915. He wrote an outline on a single piece of typewriter paper, originally calling it "The Mothers of Men." Sullivan showed the outline to Ince, and Ince decided it was worth investing $1 million.

In April 1916, the Los Angeles Times wrote:

The next large feature looming on the horizon is the Ince photoplay, Civilization...It was nearly a year in the making, and is the most pretentious of the Ince features. Many hundreds of persons took part, and it is said that the film contains some of the most beautiful photography ever shown on the screen.

At the time of its release, it was described as "the ultimate achievement of the Ince studios."

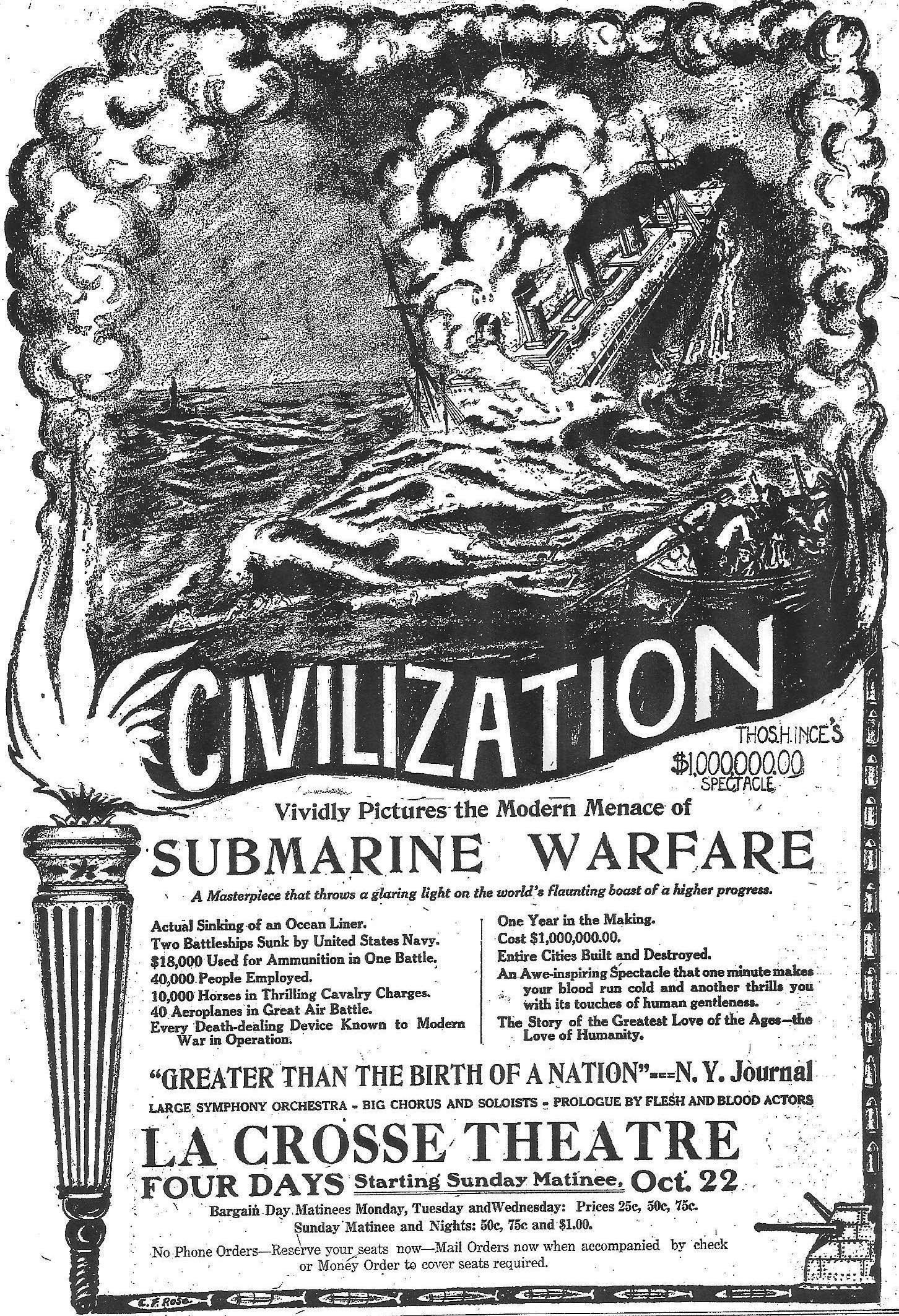
Full-page newspaper advertisement promoting the spectacle of Civilization

The film included large scale battle scenes, scenes of naval battles, trench warfare, aerial battles, and the resulting devastation. Ships from the United States Navy were utilized in the scenes depicting sea battles. Advertising for the film (pictured at right) boasted of the extravagant expense incurred in presenting the spectacle:

Actual Sinking of an Ocean Liner.
Two Battleships Sunk by United States Navy.
$18,000 Used for Ammunition in One Battle.
40,000 People Employed.
10,000 Horses in Thrilling Cavalry Charges.
40 Aeroplanes in Great Air Battle.
Every Death-dealing Device Known to Modern War in Operation.
One Year in the Making.
Cost $1,000,000.00.
Entire Cities Built and Destroyed.
An Awe-inspiring Spectacle that one minute makes your blood run cold and another thrills you with its touches of human gentleness.
The Story of the Greatest Love of the Ages —- the Love of Humanity.

George Fisher was given the daunting role of playing "The Christ" in Civilization. Press accounts mistakenly called him "the first cinema actor to portray Christ for the screen." At the time of the film's release, Fisher told the Los Angeles Times that, to get in the proper mood for the role, "he lived the life of a recluse, spending his time in study and meditation." He expressed his hope that the film's message would be heard:

I can say in truth that the playing of this part has affected my whole life and the impressions will never leave me. I have tried earnestly and sincerely, with a deep prayer in my heart, to bring a message to the world, one which will reach, perhaps, millions. Now my only wish is that whoever may witness the performances of Civilization will realize only the truth and beauty of the message.

The premiere was held at the Majestic Theatre in Los Angeles on April 17, 1916.

== Cast ==
- Howard C. Hickman as Count Ferdinand
- Herschel Mayall as The King of Wredpryd
- George Fisher as The Christ
- Enid Markey as Katheryn Haldemann
- Lola May as Queen Eugenie
- J. Frank Burke as Luther Rolf, The Peace Advocate
- Charles K. French as The Prime Minister
- J. Barney Sherry as The Blacksmith
- Jerome Storm as The Blacksmith's Son
- Ethel Ullman as The Blacksmith's Daughter
- Kate Bruce as A Mother

== Gallery ==
Scenes

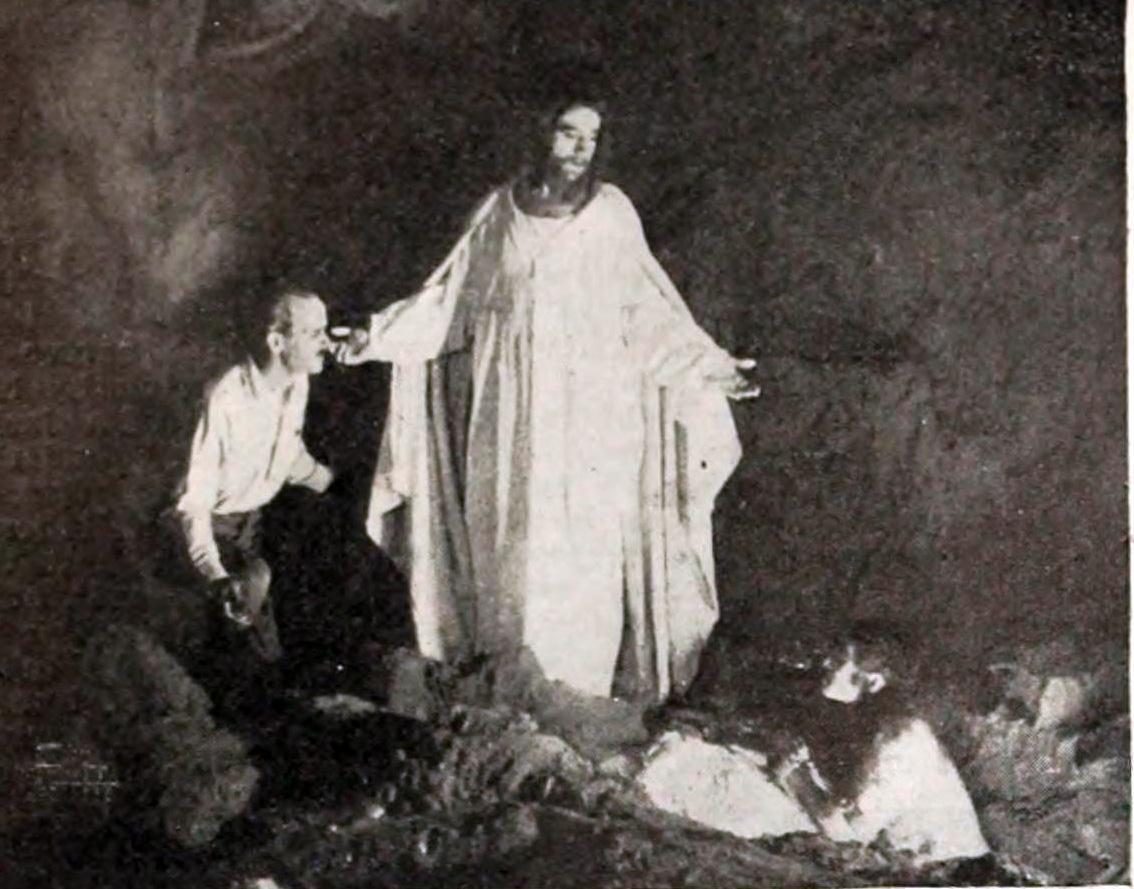

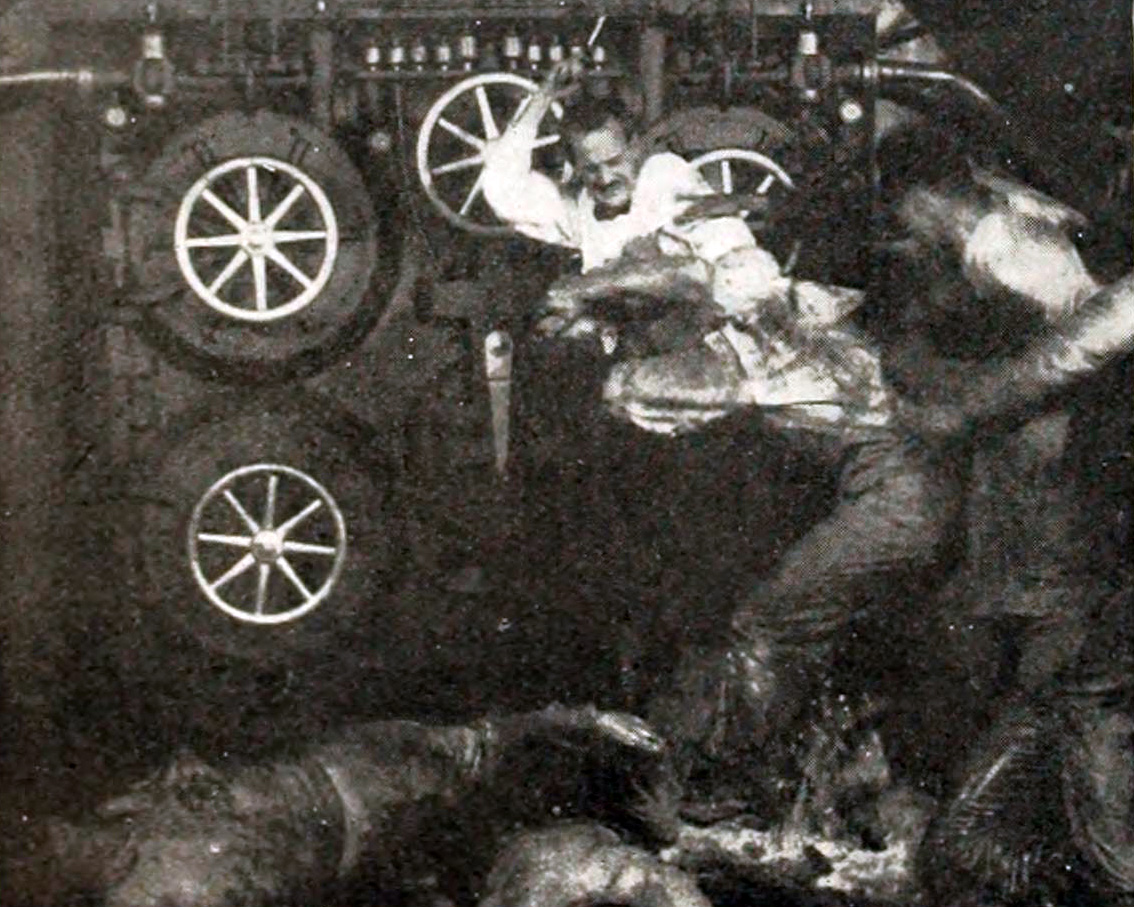

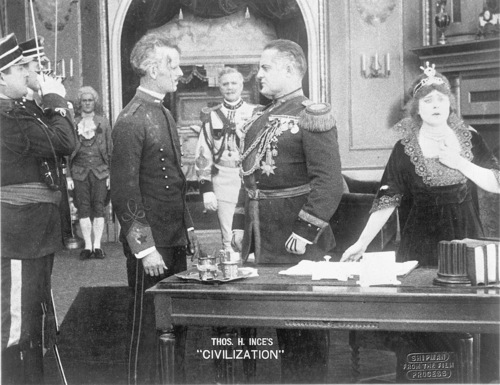

== Popular response ==
The film was a popular success when it was released in 1916. The Democratic National Committee credited the film with helping to re-elect President Woodrow Wilson in 1916. After the United States's entry into World War I, the film was pulled from distribution.

Film director Yasujirō Ozu claimed that he first decided to become a film director when watching Civilization.

== Critical reaction ==
Among critics, the reaction was mixed.

=== Positive reviews ===
In La Crosse, Wisconsin, a newspaper reviewer called it a "masterpiece" and the "Biggest Spectacle in History of Motion Pictures," surpassing even D.W. Griffith's The Birth of a Nation:

The photoplay and the spoken drama will be united for the first time in...the million dollar masterpiece of Thomas H. Ince...Civilization is an encyclopedia of the emotions. It is inevitable to compare such a picture, epic in its scope, including battles and the upheaval of a nation, to a similar picture, Griffith's Birth of a Nation. Ince has excelled his predecessor in the art of suggestion. In the vivid battle scenes of Civllization, there are four suggestive flashes for every one Griffith gave us. The conception is classically correct. No theater could be conceived that would be adequate in space or speed of action to carry across to an audience what was conveyed in this film.

In Indiana, a reviewer emphasized the film's spectacular effects and its depiction of Jesus:

'If Christ Should Visit Verdun' would make a good subtitle for Civilization, for that is really its theme...Pictorially, and in the spectacular effects that can be achieved within range of the camera, as well as in the sheer beauty of many of its scenes, it is a masterpiece indeed. Days of peace in the little town of Wrepryd, which is its locale, and in the peaceful country thereabout, might have been posed by the artist Millet, so strikingly do they stand out.

In Fairbanks, Alaska, a reviewer wrote that, if the film had been shown to the people of Europe before the war started there would have been no war:

Civilization is worth $1.50 today, tomorrow, or at any time. It is a masterpiece—a picture that grips and thrills. It preaches a powerful sermon and preaches it in a way that makes it interesting...After seeing Civilization one can truthfully say that had Henry Ford produced a film like this one that Ince directed, and sent it broadcast throughout the civilized world as an argument against war, he would have accomplished more for universal peace than did his famous 'peace expedition.' He would have reached the great mass of people who have but a faint recollection of the horrors of war, and would have showed them the pain and the suffering and the sorrow that war brings with it. Had such a picture as Civilization been shown to the people of Europe before the war started there would have been no war.

=== Negative reviews ===
Henry Christeen Warnack in the Los Angeles Times was troubled by the depiction of The Christ and wrote that the film "is not daring, it is only poor taste." He opined that it was offensive to the beliefs of Christians, Jews and atheists alike:

[T]he play will...be popular with everybody with the exception of three classes: It will probably prove offensive to Christians because they are likely to think of it as irreverent; to the Hebrew it will seem mystical and exaggerated; the non-church-goer will find it absurd and undramatic. Outside of the Christian, the Jew and the unbeliever, I haven't the sligthest [sic?] doubt of its appeal.

Warnack concluded his review as follows:

This violation of good taste and this error in judgment belong to the misconception of the story...Realizing the vast sum of money and the huge investment of talent and good faith that have been expended in this pretentious film, it is with deep regret that I am compelled to report it as a disappointment.

== See also ==
- The Kaiser, Beast of Berlin
- To Hell with the Kaiser!
- Yankee Doodle in Berlin
- Hearts of the World
- The Heart of Humanity
- Over the Rhine
- The False Faces
- The Unpardonable Sin
- The Unbeliever
- The Battle Cry of Peace
