= Wagon Tracks =

1919 film

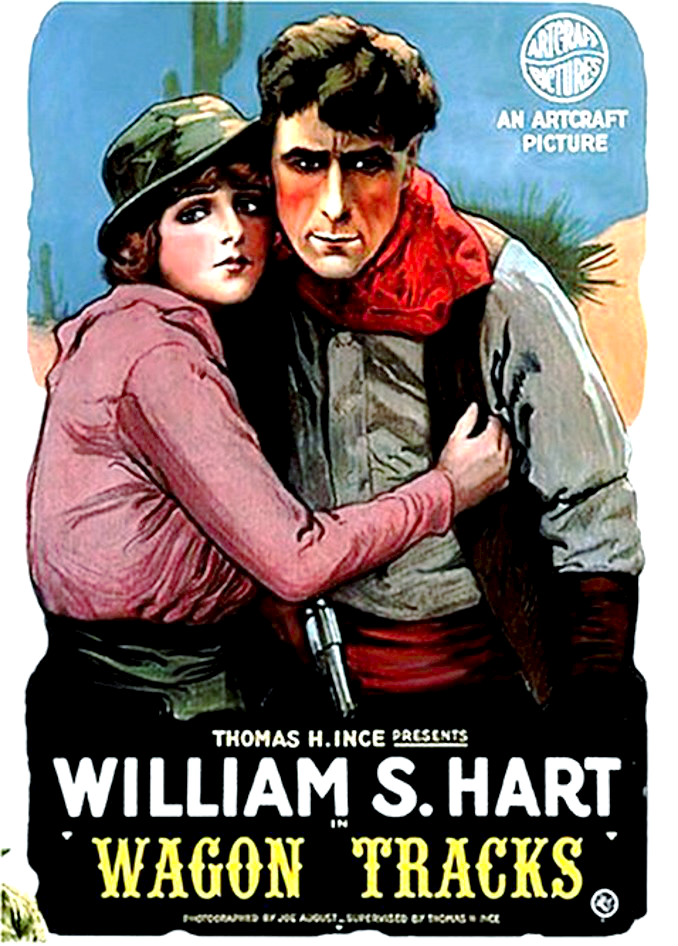
- Movie poster
- Directed by: Lambert Hillyer
- Written by: C. Gardner Sullivan
- Produced by: Thomas H. Ince; William S. Hart
- Starring: William S. Hart; Jane Novak; Robert McKim
- Cinematography: Joseph H. August
- Distributed by: Paramount Pictures/ Artcraft
- Release date: July 29, 1919
- Running time: 68 minutes
- Country: United States
- Languages: Silent; English intertitles

Wagon Tracks

Wagon Tracks is a 1919 American silent Western film written by C. Gardner Sullivan, produced by Thomas H. Ince and William S. Hart, and directed by Lambert Hillyer. Upon its release, the Los Angeles Times described it as Hollywood's greatest desert epic.

== Plot ==
The film centers on Buckskin Hamilton, a desert guide in the mold of Kit Carson. The film is set in the Gold Rush year of 1850.

Buckskin rides to Westport Landing to meet a steamer from St. Louis. The steamer is carrying a group that Buckskin has been hired to lead west on the old Santa Fe Trail from Kansas to New Mexico. The group aboard the steamship includes Buckskin's younger brother, Billy Hamilton, who has recently graduated from medical school through Buckskin's sacrifices.

While on the steamboat, Billy Hamilton catches David Washburn, a crooked gambler, cheating at cards. A fight ensues, and Washburn's sister, Jane Washburn walks in and becomes involved in a struggle over the gun. The gun is fired, and Billy Hamilton is killed. David Washburn convinces his sister that she pulled the trigger, and she takes the blame for her brother's actions.

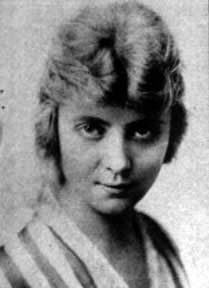
Actress Jane Novak plays Hart's love interest Jane Washburn.

Buckskin arrives to find his brother dead. Though initially vowing revenge, he is persuaded that the beautiful Jane Washburn did not intend to kill his brother. Buckskin then leads the group, including Jane and David Washburn, and Washburn's henchman, Merton, west along the Santa Fe Trail. Various adventures ensue, including two of the wagons falling over a precipice. A romance develops between Buckskin and Jane Washburn, and she confesses that Buckskin's brother had not been annoying her - the cover story developed by her brother. Buckskin becomes convinced that either David Washburn or his henchman, Merton, is responsible for the death of his brother and marches the two men into the desert at gunpoint. To save himself, Merton confesses that David Washburn killed Buckskin's brother.

As Buckskin marches the two men back to camp, he learns that one of the emigrants has shot an Indian brave. The Indian chief demands that a white man be sacrificed - "a life for a life." Buckskin gives David Washburn a choice – he can either sacrifice himself to the Indians and die a noble death or kill himself. Washburn agrees to kill himself, and Buckskin agrees to be the sacrifice to the Indians. However, Washburn fakes his suicide and tries to escape, running into the Indian camp where he is mistaken for, and accepted as, the sacrifice. Buckskin walks into the Indian camp as the Indians execute Washburn. Buckskin returns to the camp, where the movie ends in uncertainty as whether the death of David Washburn will cast a permanent shadow over the budding romance between Buckskin and Jane Washburn. The movie ends with Buckskin riding into the desert. Before he leaves, Jane says, "Then some day - you'll come back?" As he rides into the spreading dawn, Buckskin sadly replies, "Mebbe, Miss."

== Cast ==
- William S. Hart as Buckskin Hamilton
- Jane Novak as Jane Washburn
- Robert McKim as David Washburn
- Lloyd Bacon as Guy Merton
- Leo Pierson as Billy Hamilton
- Bert Sprotte as Brick Muldoon
- Charles Arling as The Captain

== Critical reception ==
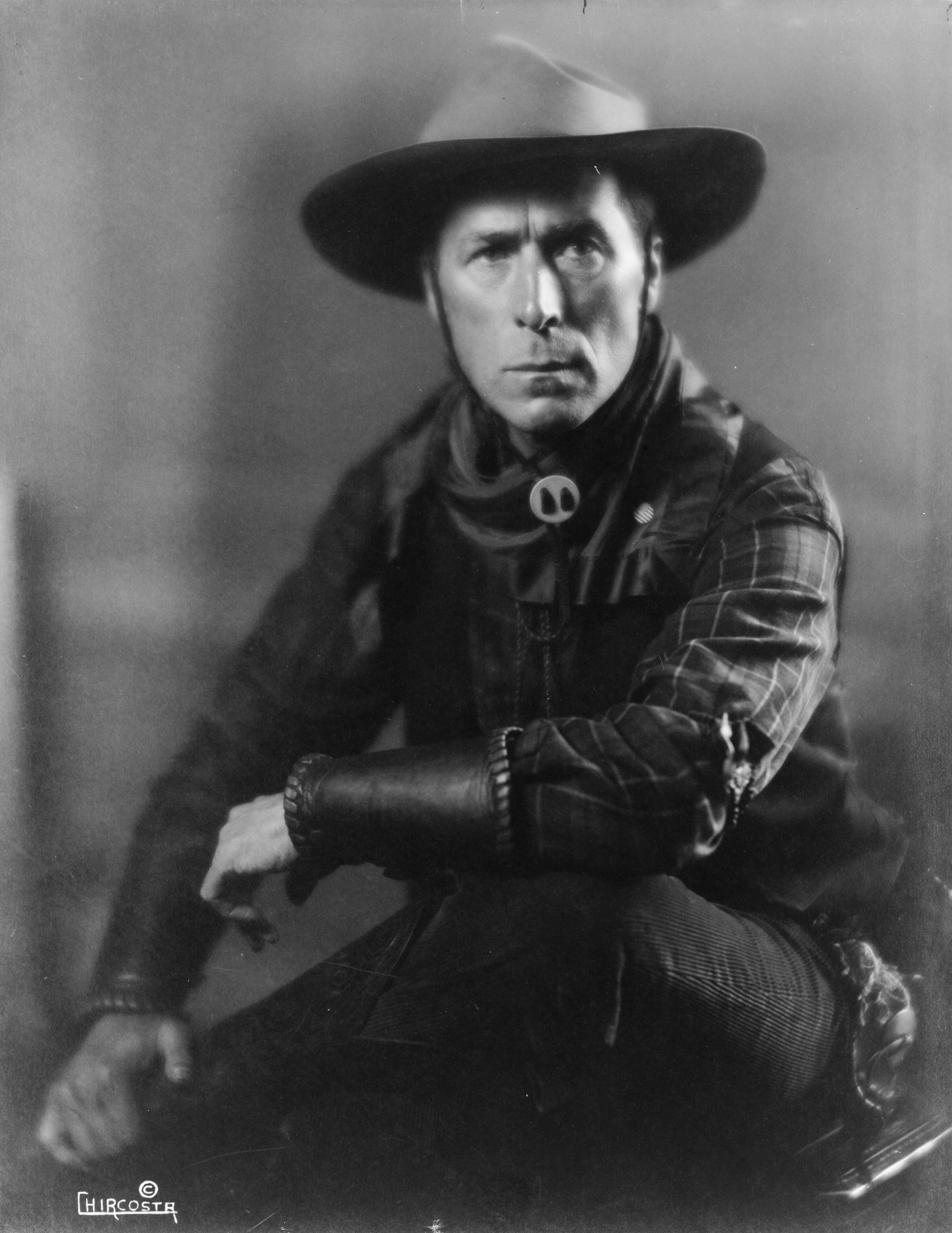
William S. Hart was the lead actor and producer of Wagon Tracks.

Upon its release in 1919, Wagon Tracks was hailed by the Los Angeles Times as the industry's "Greatest Desert Epic." In its praise of the film, the Times continued, "The great desert screen epic is with us at last. It has been done by William S. Hart and C. Gardner Sullivan, with the aid of a fine cast and superlative photography ... Let it also be said that the music adds so vividly to the charm of the production that it might be said to be raised to that level of artistic achievement for which the big ones among the producers and exhibitors are always striving, and which for lack of a better name we call by that rather grandiose one of grand opera of the screen."

Commenting on the screenplay, the Times called it Sullivan's "masterpiece," a "strikingly original story," and wrote that "it breathes that clean-cut, Americanism always striven for by play-wrights, novelists and operatic writers -- it is as ruggedly and wholesomely American as its name." As for Hart, the Times wrote that "it seems as if all his former efforts were mere training for this big epic of the outdoors."

Other reviewers also praised the film. The Atlanta Constitution called it an "unusually worth while offering" with "a story about love and fighting and Indians and thrills galore, a picture in which the popular screen hero literally outdoes himself." The Atlanta paper also wrote that Hart's face was "the synonym for power and manliness" and concluded, "No one who sees this picture will soon forget it. It will be a vivid memory for months afterward." The reviewer for the Lima Times Democrat wrote that "this is the strongest story Mr. Hart has had in a long time."

== Blu-ray release ==
The movie was released on Blu-ray by Olive Films on 24 January 2017.
