= Knight of the Trail =

1915 film

- Complete film
- Directed by: William S. Hart
- Written by: Richard V. Spencer; Thomas H. Ince
- Starring: William S. Hart
- Cinematography: Robert Doeran
- Production company: New York Motion Picture Corporation
- Distributed by: Mutual Film Corporation
- Release date: August 20, 1915
- Running time: 24 minutes
- Country: United States
- Languages: Silent; English intertitles

Knight of the Trail is a 1915 American short silent Western film directed by and starring William S. Hart.

== Cast ==
- William S. Hart as Jim Treen
- Leona Hutton as Molly Stewart
- Frank Borzage as Bill Carey

== Reception ==
Like many American films of the time, Knight of the Trail was subject to cuts by city and state film censorship boards. The Chicago Board of Censors required a cut of the scene of Jim being shot and the shooting by Jim.
