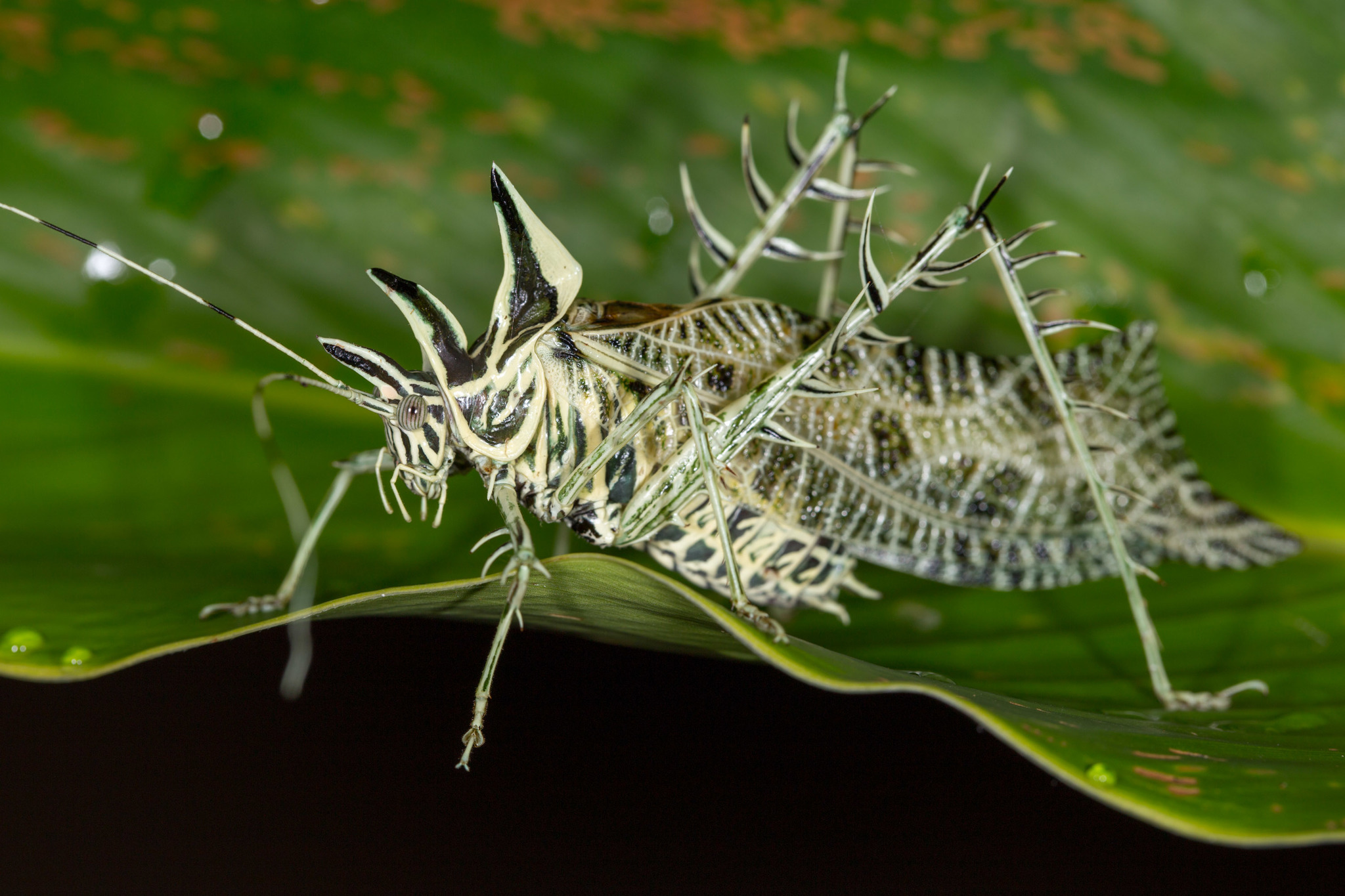
- Markia arizae

Scientific classification
- Domain: Eukaryota
- Kingdom: Animalia
- Phylum: Arthropoda
- Class: Insecta
- Order: Orthoptera
- Suborder: Ensifera
- Family: Tettigoniidae
- Subfamily: Phaneropterinae
- Tribe: Dysoniini
- Genus: Markia; White, 1862

Synonyms
- Tricala Walker, 1869; Mackia Walker, 1871

= Markia =

Genus of cricket-like animals

Markia is a genus in the family Tettigoniidae, sometimes called lichen katydids, which are found in Mexico, Central America and South America, often in highlands; however, the term "lichen katydids" is also used for other genera in the tribe Dysoniini. As suggested by the name, the spiny Markia katydids live and feed on Usnea lichen, and their shape and color pattern provides them with an excellent camouflage in this habitat. They are quite large, with adults typically 4.5–6.5 cm (1.8–2.6 in) long.

== Species ==
The Orthoptera species file includes:

species group erinaceus Cadena-Castañeda & Gorochov, 2013

1. Markia agudeloi Cadena-Castañeda, 2013
2. Markia arizae Cadena-Castañeda, 2013
3. Markia bolivarensis Cadena-Castañeda, 2013
4. Markia erinaceus Cadena-Castañeda & Gorochov, 2013
5. Markia gaianii Cadena-Castañeda, 2013
6. Markia guerreroi Cadena-Castañeda, 2013

species group hystrix (Westwood, 1844)

1. Markia espinachi Cadena-Castañeda, 2013
2. Markia hystrix (Westwood, 1844) - type species
3. Markia major (Brunner von Wattenwyl, 1878)
4. Markia nicolasi Cadena-Castañeda, 2013

species group sarriai Cadena-Castañeda, 2013

1. Markia sarriai Cadena-Castañeda, 2013
