= The Scourge of the Desert =

1915 film

- Directed by: William S. Hart
- Written by: C. Gardner Sullivan; Thomas H. Ince; William Clifford
- Starring: William S. Hart; Rhea Mitchell; Gordon Mullen
- Distributed by: Mutual Film
- Release date: January 6, 1915
- Running time: 20 minutes
- Country: United States
- Languages: Silent; English intertitles

The Scourge of the Desert (also known as Reformed Outlaw) is a 1915 American short silent Western film starring William S. Hart and Rhea Mitchell. It was billed as, "A Thrilling (Broncho) Romance of the Arizona Staked Plains." It was produced by Thomas H. Ince and written by C. Gardner Sullivan, Ince, and William Clifford.

== Cast ==
- William S. Hart as Bill Evers
- Rhea Mitchell as Ellen Holt
- Gordon Mullen as John Holt
- Joseph J. Dowling as Pastor Holt
- Roy Laidlaw as Croupier
- Walter Belasco
