= The Border Wireless =

1918 film

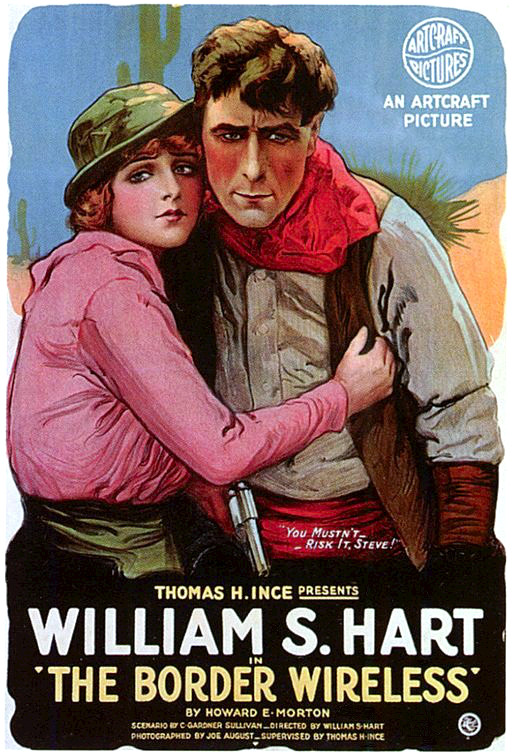
- Film poster with likenesses of Bill Hart and Wanda Hawley
- Directed by: William S. Hart
- Written by: Howard E. Morton (screen story); C. Gardner Sullivan (scenario); Irwin J. Martin (intertitles)
- Produced by: William S. Hart; Thomas H. Ince
- Starring: William S. Hart; Wanda Hawley
- Cinematography: Joseph August
- Production company: William S. Hart Productions
- Distributed by: Artcraft Pictures (affiliate of Paramount Pictures)
- Release date: September 29, 1918
- Running time: 50 minutes; 5 reels (4,353 feet)
- Country: United States
- Languages: Silent; English intertitles

The Border Wireless is a lost 1918 American silent Western film produced and directed by William S. Hart and distributed by Artcraft Pictures, an affiliate of Famous Players–Lasky and Paramount Pictures. Hart stars in the film along with Wanda Hawley as his leading lady.

== Cast ==
- William S. Hart as Steve Ransom
- Wanda Hawley as Elsa Miller
- Charles Arling as Herman Brandt
- Erich von Ritzau as Frederick Schloss
- Bert Sprotte as Von Helm
- Marcia Manon as Esther Meier
- James Mason as Carl Miller (unbilled)
