= Joseph August =

American cinematographer (1890–1947)

Joseph H. August
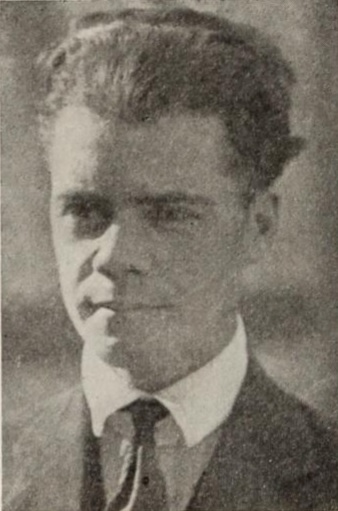
- Joseph H. August (1922)
- Born: April 26, 1890; Idaho Springs, Colorado, U.S.
- Died: September 25, 1947 (aged 57)
- Education: Colorado School of Mining
- Occupation: Cinematographer
- Years active: 1913–1947
- Known for: ASC Co-founder
- Children: Son, Joseph S. August (1916–2006)

Joseph H. August, A.S.C. (26 April 1890 – 25 September 1947) was an American cinematographer and co-founder of the American Society of Cinematographers.

His films included Gunga Din (1939) for which he was nominated for Academy Award for Best Cinematography, The Hunchback of Notre Dame (1939), The Devil and Daniel Webster (1941), and Portrait of Jennie (1948).

He died in 1947 shortly after completing the filming of Portrait of Jennie. He received his second Oscar nomination, posthumously, for this film. His son, Joseph S. August (1916–2006), was also a cinematographer.

== Selected filmography ==
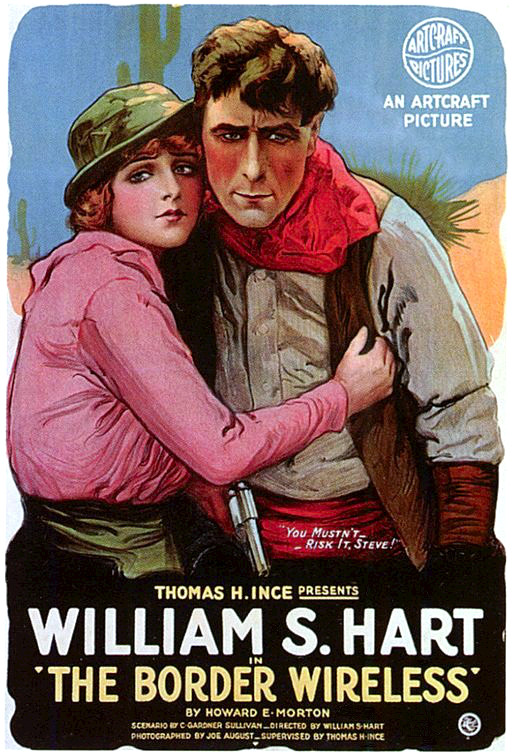
Poster for The Border Wireless, photographed by Joe August

- Hell's Hinges (1916; film debut)
- The Apostle of Vengeance (1916)
- The Aryan (1916)
- Truthful Tulliver (1917)
- The Gunfighter (1917)
- 'Blue Blazes' Rawden (1918)
- The Border Wireless (1918)
- Selfish Yates (1918)
- Travelin' On (1922)
- St. Elmo (1923)
- Good-By Girls! (1923)
- The Vagabond Trail (1924)
- Tumbleweeds (1925)
- The Beloved Rogue (1927)
- Two Arabian Knights (1928)
- Up the River (1930)
- The Black Camel (1931)
- The Brat (1931)
- Seas Beneath (1931)
- Vanity Street (1932)
- The Silent Witness (1932)
- As the Devil Commands (1932)
- The Circus Queen Murder (1933)
- Black Moon (1934)
- The Captain Hates the Sea (1934)
- Among the Missing (1934)
- Twentieth Century (1934)
- The Whole Town's Talking (1935)
- The Informer (1935)
- Sylvia Scarlett (1935)
- Mary of Scotland (1936)
- The Plough and the Stars (1936)
- The Soldier and the Lady (1937)
- The Saint in New York (1938)
- Gunga Din (1939)
- Man of Conquest (1939)
- Nurse Edith Cavell (1939)
- The Hunchback of Notre Dame (1939)
- Primrose Path (1940)
- Dance, Girl, Dance (1940)
- Melody Ranch (1940)
- The Devil and Daniel Webster (1941)
- They Were Expendable (1945)
- Portrait of Jennie (1948, final film)
