= Pinto Ben =

1915 film

Pinto Ben (aka Horns and Hoof)
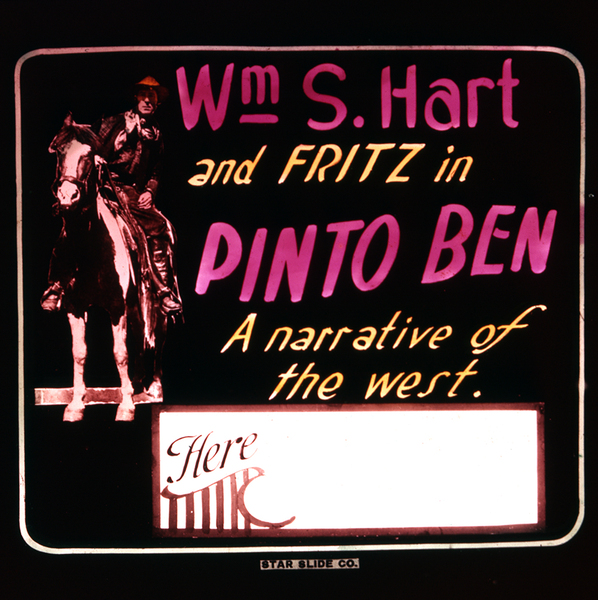
- lantern slide
- Directed by: William S. Hart
- Based on: poem Pinto Ben by William S. Hart
- Produced by: Broncho Motion Picture Company; Thomas H. Ince
- Starring: William S. Hart
- Cinematography: Robert Doeran
- Distributed by: Mutual Film
- Release date: August 25, 1915
- Running time: 2 reels
- Country: United States
- Languages: Silent; English intertitles

Pinto Ben is a 1915 short silent Western film written, directed by and starring William S. Hart. It had an alternate title of Horns and Hoofs and was released by Mutual Film. It was re-released in 1924 by Tri-Stone Pictures.

The film is preserved in the Library of Congress collection.

== Cast ==
- William S. Hart as Boss Rider
- Fritz the horse as Pinto Ben
