= The Quakeress =

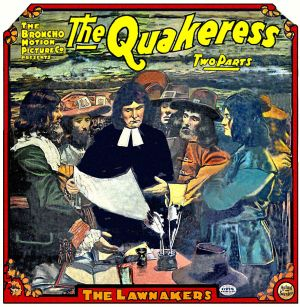
- Theatrical poster
- Directed by: Raymond B. West
- Written by: J. G. Hawks
- Produced by: Broncho Motion Picture Company
- Starring: Louise Glaum; Charles Ray; William Desmond Taylor
- Distributed by: Mutual Film
- Release date: August 13, 1913
- Running time: 20 minutes (2-reels)
- Country: United States
- Language: Silent with English intertitles

The Quakeress is a 1913 silent era short costume drama motion picture starring Louise Glaum, Charles Ray, and William Desmond Taylor.

Directed by Raymond B. West for the Broncho Motion Picture Company, the screenplay was written by J. G. Hawks.

The film was released on August 13, and distributed by the Mutual Film Corporation in two 10-minute parts (two-reels).

== Plot ==
The setting is an early American village, where a young Quaker woman, Priscilla (played by Glaum), is in love with the schoolmaster, John Hart (played by Ray). The local minister, Rev. Cole (played by Taylor), who calls on her at her cabin with flowers, is an unwelcome suitor. In revenge, he has "blue laws" passed, among them is one requiring attendance at church on Sunday.

Priscilla refuses to comply with the law and is arrested. After being plunged in and out of water and pilloried, she is banished from the colony. John goes with her. They are attacked by Indians and John is badly wounded. Priscilla manages to get back to the village in time to warn the Puritans of an impending attack. They defeat the Indians after a desperate battle.

The Rev. Cole, who has been mortally wounded, begs Priscilla's forgiveness and the Puritans make amends for their harsh treatment of her.

== Cast ==
- Louise Glaum as Priscilla
- Charles Ray as John Hart
- William Desmond Taylor as Rev. Cole

== Preservation status ==
- A print of this film is housed in the Library of Congress collection.

== See also ==
- List of American films of 1913
