= Love (1920 film) =

1920 film by Wesley Ruggles

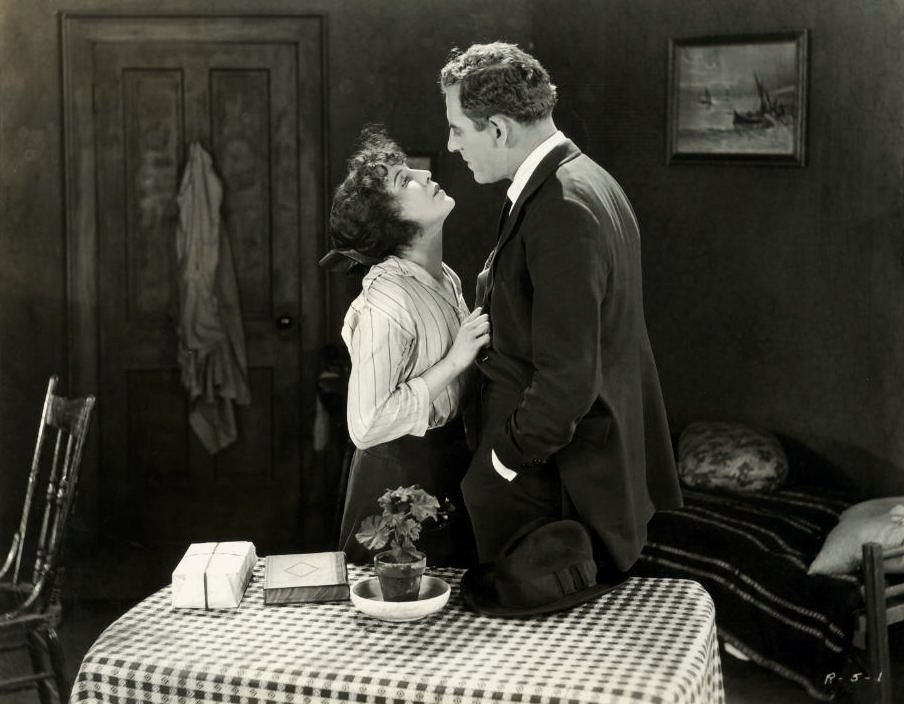
- Louise Glaum and James Kirkwood in the film
- Directed by: Wesley Ruggles
- Written by: Louis Joseph Vance
- Produced by: J. Parker Read, Jr.
- Starring: Louise Glaum; James Kirkwood; Joseph Kilgour
- Cinematography: Charles J. Stumar
- Edited by: Ralph H. Dixon
- Distributed by: Associated Producers
- Release date: December 5, 1920
- Running time: 70 minutes
- Country: United States
- Language: Silent with English intertitles

Love is an extant 1920 American silent romanctic drama film starring Louise Glaum, James Kirkwood, and Joseph Kilgour. Directed by Wesley Ruggles and produced by J. Parker Read, Jr., the screenplay was adapted by Louis Joseph Vance based on a story by Carol Kapleau.

== Plot ==
A young woman, Natalie Storm, works in a sweatshop and struggles to support her mother and little sister, Beatrice. Their mother dies and Beatrice suffers from poverty.

Because of her circumstances, Natalie rejects the marriage proposal of Tom Chandler, a self-educated mining engineer. He then leaves for South America, where he intends to make his fortune. To save her sister and herself, Natalie becomes the mistress of a wealthy Wall Street magnate, Alvin Dunning. When he publicly humiliates her, however, she becomes determined to free herself.

Meanwhile, Chandler discovers a copper mine in South America and returns. He is invited to a party at Dunning's home. When he meets Natalie as Dunning's mistress he is heartbroken and abruptly leaves. Natalie is by now desperate to get away from Dunning. She then acquires enough money from a lucky stock tip to leave him.

Dunning finds Natalie and attempts to force her to return to him. He is killed in a violent car accident and Natalie is severely injured. Upon opening her eyes after the crash, she sees Chandler standing over her. The couple is happily reconciled.

== Cast ==
- Louise Glaum as Natalie Storm
- Peggy Cartwright as Beatrice Storm
- James Kirkwood as Tom Chandler
- Joseph Kilgour as Alvin Dunning
- Edith Yorke as Natalie's mother
- Laura La Plante - (*scenes deleted)

== Production ==
The working title of the movie was The Woman Who Dared. Love was released by J. Parker Read, Jr., on December 5, through Associated Producers. The technical director was Harvey C. Leavitt and the technical director of architecture was Charles H. Kyson. The intertitles were written by H. Tipton Steck. The art titles were by F. J. van Halle, Carl Schneider and Leo H. Braun.

Love was banned by the British Board of Film Censors in 1921.

== Preservation ==
A copy of Love is held by the Archives du Film du CNC in Bois d'Arcy.

== See also ==
- List of American films of 1920
- List of banned films
