= I Am Guilty (1921 film) =

1921 film by Jack Nelson

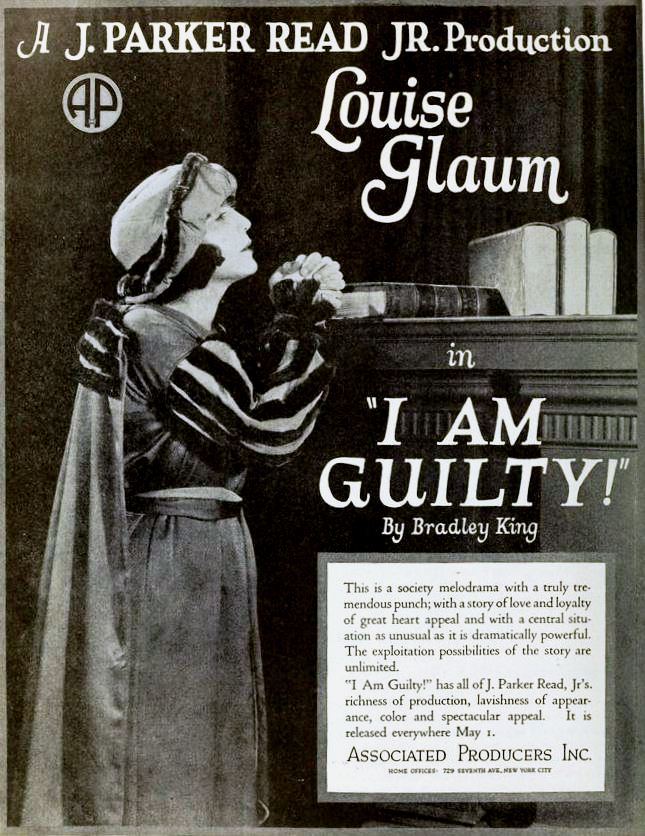
- Advertisement
- Directed by: Jack Nelson
- Written by: Bradley King
- Starring: Louise Glaum; Mahlon Hamilton; Claire Du Brey
- Cinematography: Charles J. Stumar
- Production company: J. Parker Read Jr. Productions
- Distributed by: Associated Producers
- Release date: May 27, 1921
- Running time: 70 minutes
- Country: United States
- Language: Silent (English intertitles)

I Am Guilty is a 1921 American silent drama film directed by Jack Nelson and starring Louise Glaum, Mahlon Hamilton, and Claire Du Brey.

== Plot ==
A lawyer defends his own wife, a former chorus girl, who has been accused of murder.

== Cast ==
- Louise Glaum as Connie MacNair
- Mahlon Hamilton as Robert MacNair
- Claire Du Brey as Trixie
- Joseph Kilgour as Teddy Garrick
- Ruth Stonehouse as London Hattie
- May Hopkins as Molly May
- George Cooper as Dillon
- Michael D. Moore as The Child
- Frederick Ko Vert as The Dancer

== Preservation ==
With no copies of I Am Guilty located in any film archives, it is a lost film.

== Bibliography ==
- Munden, Kenneth White. The American Film Institute Catalog of Motion Pictures Produced in the United States, Part 1. University of California Press, 1997.
