= The Goddess of Lost Lake =

1918 film by Wallace Worsley

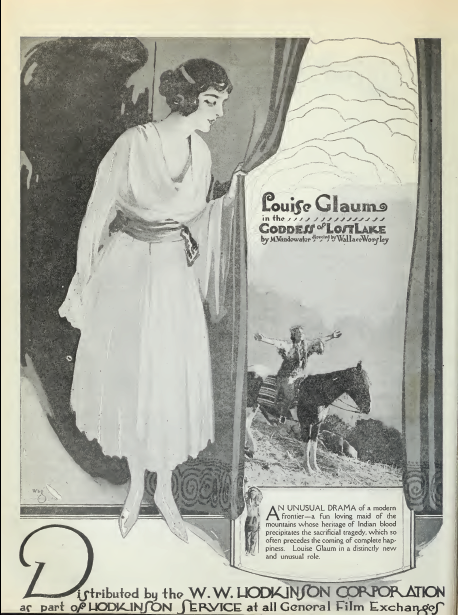
- Ad for film
- Directed by: Wallace Worsley
- Written by: Jack Cunningham
- Produced by: Louise Glaum; Robert Bunton
- Starring: Louise Glaum; Lawson Butt; Hayward Mack
- Cinematography: L. Guy Wilky
- Distributed by: W. W. Hodkinson Corporation
- Release date: October 14, 1918
- Running time: 50 minutes
- Country: United States
- Language: Silent (English intertitles)

The Goddess of Lost Lake is a 1918 American silent era drama film starring Louise Glaum, Lawson Butt, and Hayward Mack.

Directed by Wallace Worsley and produced by Louise Glaum and Robert Bunton through her production company, the Louise Glaum Organization, in association with Robert Brunton Productions, the screenplay was adapted by Jack Cunningham based on a story by M. Van de Water.

This film is now lost.

== Plot ==
The story is about a young woman who is a quarter Native American Indian, Mary Thorne, who returns to the home of her prospector father, Marshall Thorne, after completing her education in the East. She has a college degree and an air of refinement.

While her father is away hunting for gold at Lost Lake, Mary enjoys the freedom of his mountain cabin. When two hunters on a hunting expedition, Mark Hamilton and Chester Martin, show up and visit the cabin she decides to put on Indian clothing and pretend she is a full-blooded Indian princess for fun. Both men are attracted to the Indian maiden and Hamilton falls deeply in love with her. Martin, however, is contemptuous of her Indian background. When Mary hears him making derisive remarks about the Indian race, she returns to her father's cabin.

Martin follows her home, enters her bedroom, and attacks her. Hamilton comes to her rescue and prevents Martin from raping her. He then looks around the room and sees the modern decor. Realizing that Mary is a young woman of culture and education, he becomes angry because she fooled him and leaves. Meanwhile, while Mary's father is searching for gold, which legend has it is at the bottom of Lost Lake, a legend that also says a white man who once stole some of the gold killed an Indian prince and a white man's blood must fall before anymore gold can be taken, he is killed by an Indian guard at Lost Lake.

Mary inherits the gold that her father discovered. Hamilton, who cannot forget her, comes back and they are married.

== Cast ==
- Louise Glaum as Mary Thorne
- Lawson Butt as Mark Hamilton
- Hayward Mack as Chester Martin
- Joseph J. Dowling as Marshall Thorne
- Frank Lanning as Eagle

== Reception ==
Like many American films of the time, The Goddess of Lost Lake was subject to restrictions and cuts by city and state film censorship boards. For example, the Chicago Board of Censors required a cut, in Reel 5, of the intertitle "I've as good right as you".

== Production ==
Scenes for The Goddess of Lost Lake were filmed at Big Bear Lake and the Pinecrest Resort in the San Bernardino Mountains.
