= The Wolf Woman =

1916 film by Raymond B. West

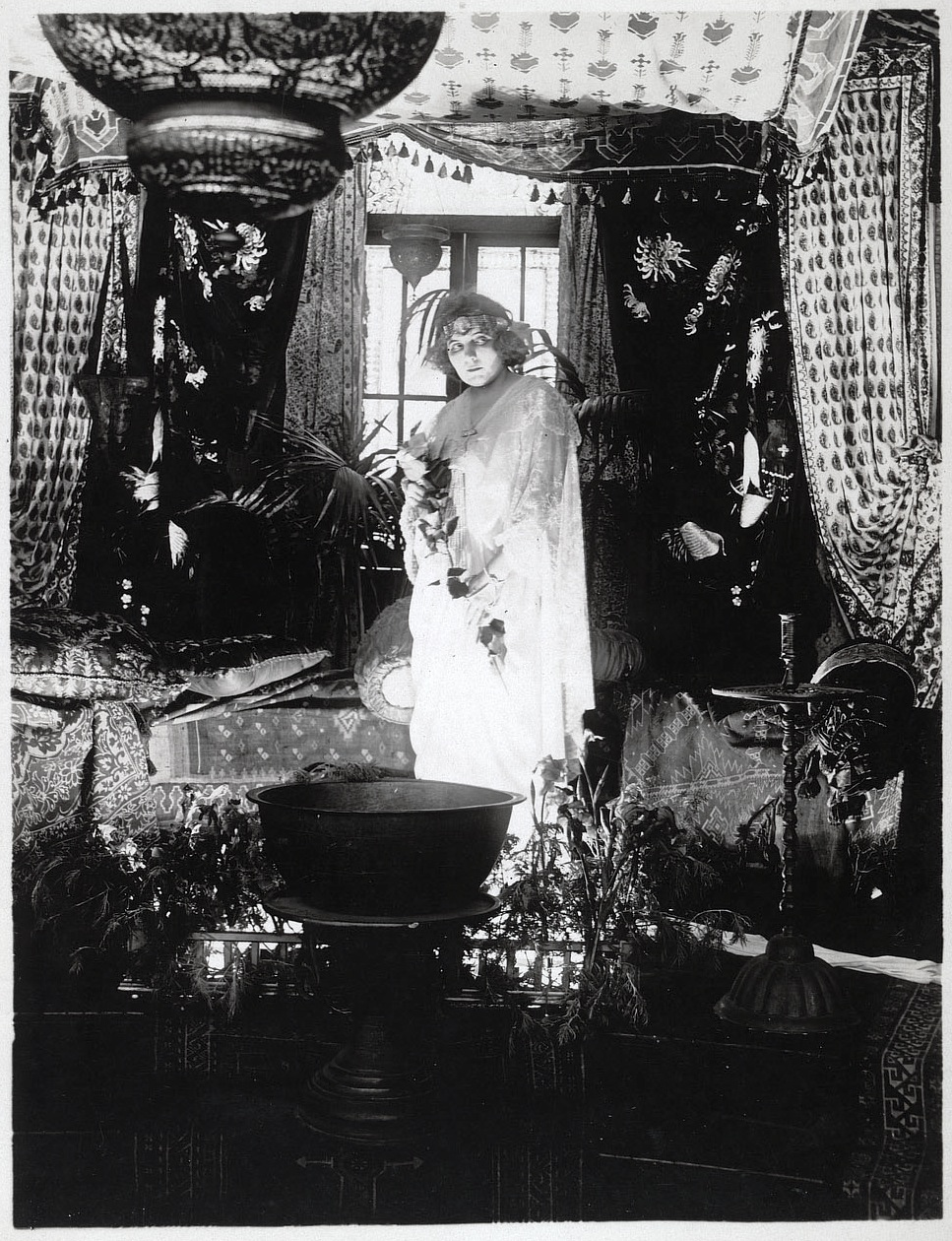
- Directed by: Raymond B. West
- Written by: C. Gardner Sullivan
- Produced by: Thomas H. Ince
- Starring: Louise Glaum; Howard C. Hickman; Charles Ray
- Cinematography: J. D. H. Herriott
- Production company: Kay-Bee Pictures
- Distributed by: Triangle Film
- Release date: September 17, 1916
- Running time: 50 min. (5-reels)
- Country: United States
- Language: Silent with English intertitles

The Wolf Woman is a 1916 silent era drama motion picture starring Louise Glaum, Howard C. Hickman, and Charles Ray.

The film was directed by Raymond B. West and produced by Thomas H. Ince, the screenplay was written by C. Gardner Sullivan.

== Plot ==
Leila Aradella (played by Glaum), a young and egotistical woman, finds pleasure from preying on weak men with her charm and beauty. John Morton (played by Hickman), a brilliant lawyer, is ruined both morally and financially by her. Rex Walden (played by Ray), the big-hearted son of a society matron, Mrs. Walden (played by Claire), then falls for Leila and proposes marriage.

The family and friends of Rex, who has become her complete slave, protest his decision, believing that Leila is trouble. Mrs. Walden sends his older brother, Franklin Walden (played by Standing), to attempt to stop Leila from playing with Rex's affections. Franklin, however, falls in love with her himself.

When Rex learns that Leila has left him for his brother, he is driven to commit suicide by her callous behavior. Mrs. Walden, now desperate, enlists Adele Harley (played by Temple), a girl of strong moral character, to win Franklin's affections away from Leila.

Franklin is gradually drawn away from Leila and Adele's victory causes Leila to lose her confidence. In a drunken and angry state, Leila falls through a massive mirror and her face is cut by a shard of glass. After "marring the beauty of her face so utterly that her power to charm men is forever lost," the permanently disfigured Leila ends up a broken and lonely woman.

== Cast ==
- Louise Glaum as Leila Aradella
- Howard C. Hickman as John Morton
- Charles Ray as Rex Walden
- Wyndham Standing as Franklin Walden
- Gertrude Claire as Mrs. Walden
- Marjory Temple as Adele Harley

== Production ==
The film attracted attention for the special effect of Glaum's character falling headlong through a large mirror. One newspaper reported on the effect as follows: "The effect is declared to be among the most sensational ever filmed, and for that reason the director and his camera man refuse to divulge their secret. So far, in fact, is it removed from ordinary photographic trickery that it bewildered the studio folk when they saw it in the projecting room."

Newspaper advertisements for the film called Leila "a modern siren," a woman who "regards men as her rightful prey." The studio's advertising also touted C. Gardner Sullivan's script for its "daring disregard for the artificialities of conventional dramatic construction," noting that he "has no mercy on the 'Wolf Woman' and crowns her career of self glorification and malicious destruction with ruin and disfigurement."

Sullivan said that he intended Glaum's character to be "a living proof of the triumph of the flesh, in whose creed the lure of the physical was placed above moral, spiritual or mental worth, and in whose incense-laden apartments the idol of sensuality replaced the crucifix or family Bible."

== Critical reception ==
After seeing the film, it was reported that New York critics unanimously pronounced Glaum as "the greatest vampire woman of all time." Another reviewer noted that Glaum had become famous for her "vampire" characterizations and billed The Wolf Woman as the "Greatest Vampire picture of all."
