= The Return of Draw Egan =

1916 film

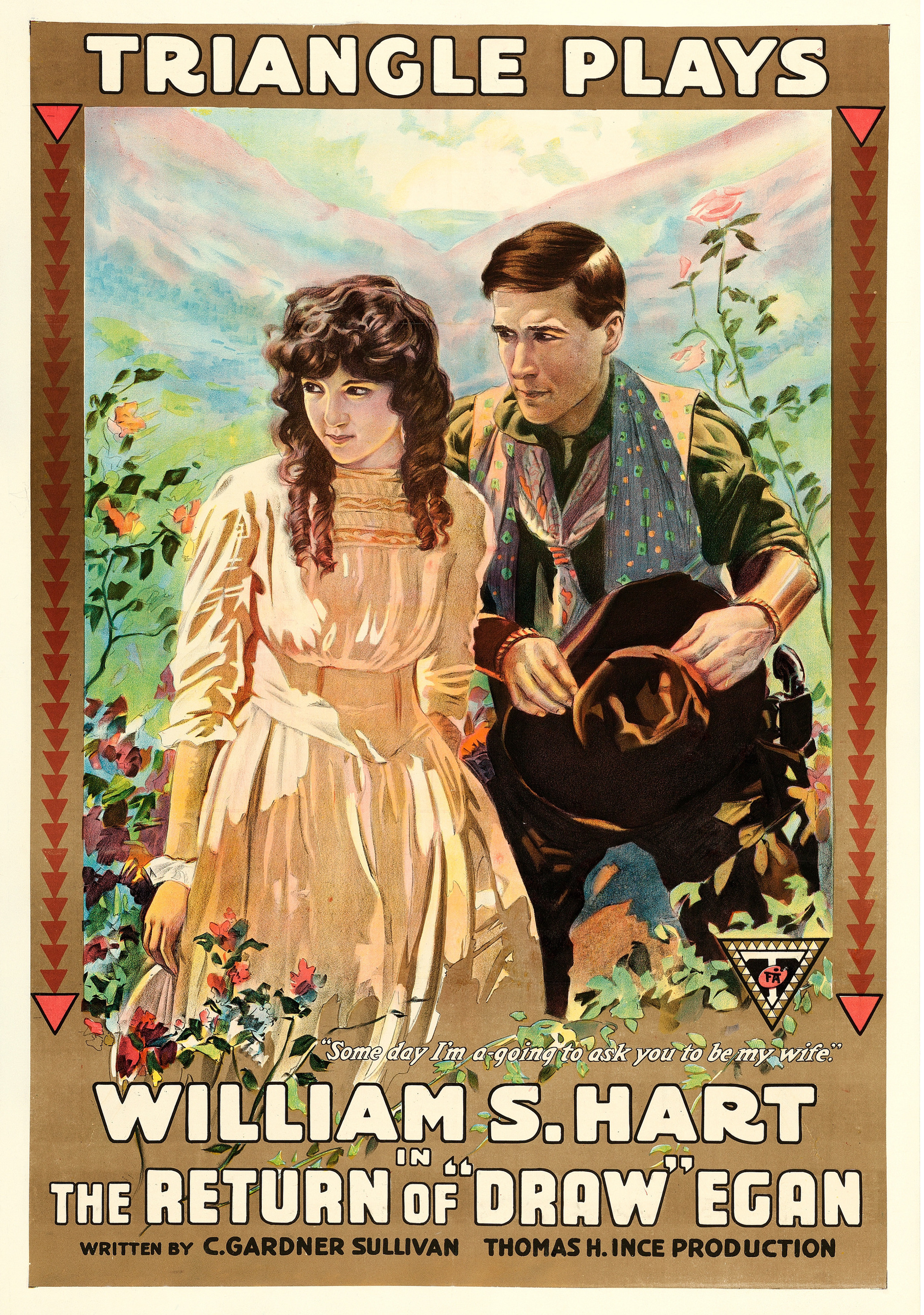
- Theatrical release poster
- Directed by: William S. Hart
- Written by: C. Gardner Sullivan
- Produced by: Thomas H. Ince
- Starring: William S. Hart; Louise Glaum; Margery Wilson
- Cinematography: Joseph H. August
- Distributed by: Triangle Distributing
- Release date: October 15, 1916
- Running time: 50 minutes (5-reels)
- Country: United States
- Languages: Silent; English intertitles

The Return of Draw Egan is a 1916 American silent Western film starring William S. Hart, Louise Glaum, Margery Wilson, Robert McKim, and J.P. Lockney.

Directed by William S. Hart and produced by Thomas H. Ince for Kay-Bee Pictures and the New York Motion Picture Company, the screenplay was written by C. Gardner Sullivan.

According to modern sources, the assistant director was Cliff Smith and the art director was Robert Brunton.

One of the early five-reel feature length silent movies, The Return of Draw Egan was exhibited on October 1, 1916, at the Realto Theater in New York City. The western was re-released in 1924. It is currently available on DVD.

== Plot ==
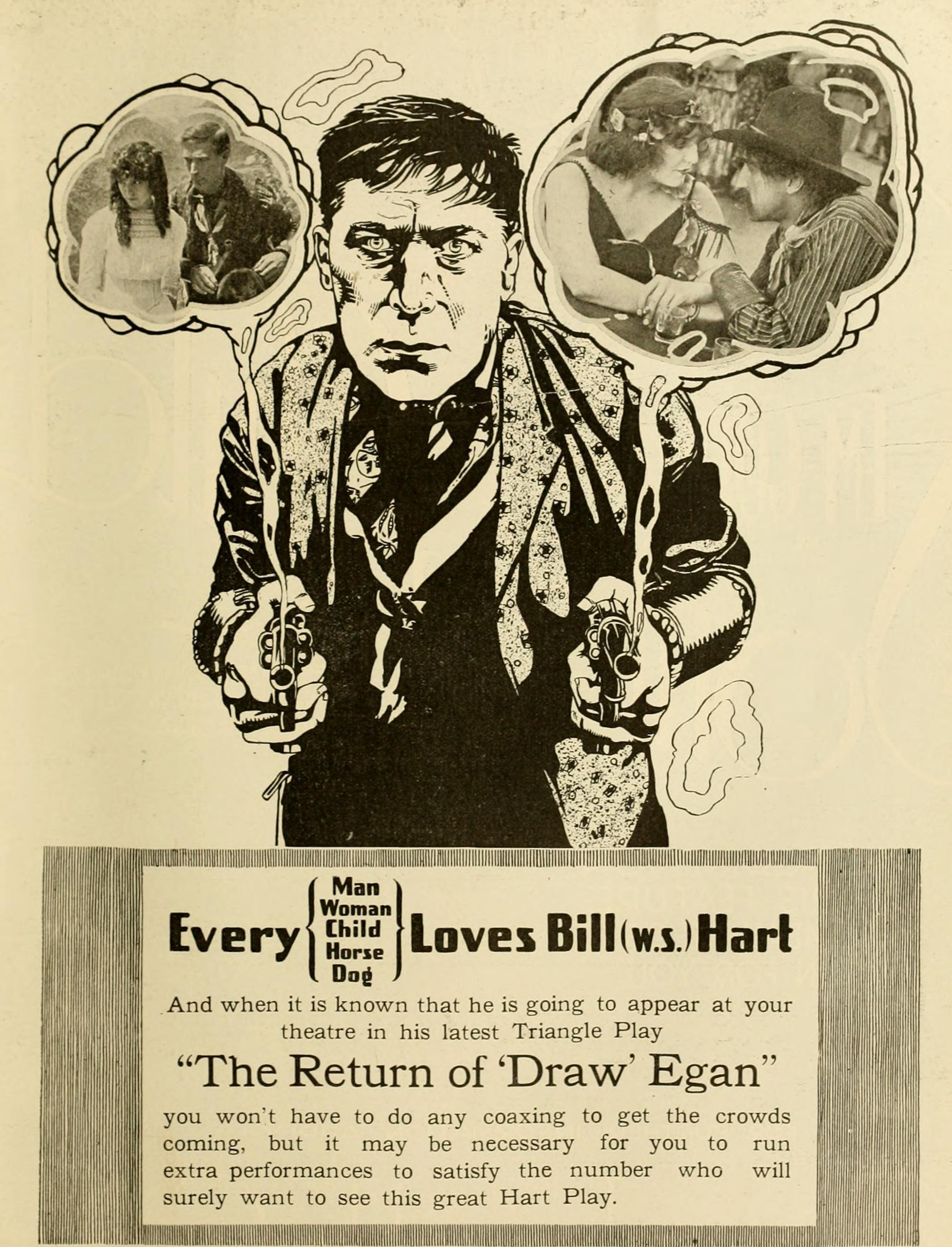
Advertisement

The Return of Draw Egan

The setting is the American Wild West. The notorious outlaw leader "Draw" Egan and his gang is chased by a posse of lawmen to his remote mountain cabin, where they are trapped. During a fierce shootout, Egan opens a trapdoor and they escape through a tunnel before the posse can overwhelm them.

With a bounty on his head, Egan turns up in the dangerous frontier range town of Yellow Dog. Presenting himself by the assumed name William Blake, he enters the saloon. The seductive dance-hall girl, Poppy, uses her alluring wiles to entice and entertain him. He looks amused when he is challenged to fight by a rowdy barfly, then punches and finishes the man off with the one powerful blow. The townspeople are impressed. Believing Blake to be a strong and law-abiding man, they want him to be their new marshal. The reformist mayor, Mat Buckton, hires him for the much avoided position to restore law and order and rid the town of the lawless gunmen who have nearly taken over.

Blake turns Yellow Dog into a model community, while hiding his criminal past, and plans to move on soon. But when he sees the mayor's daughter, Myrtle Buckton, he decides to stay on as marshal of Yellow Dog. Beginning a romance with the God-fearing young woman, he proceeds to settle down and become a genuinely lawful and respected member of the town. Then Arizona Joe, a member of Egan's former gang, shows up in Yellow Dog to make trouble. He threatens to expose Egan's past if he tries to make him obey the law and not help him take over the town.

The marshal gives in for a while, but then decides that the welfare of the town is more important than his romance with Myrtle. When he goes after Arizona Joe, the outlaw keeps his word and tells the whole town about Draw Egan. During the final showdown, which is short and brutal, Egan shoots and kills Joe. He then surrenders himself for arrest, but the grateful townspeople refuse to hear of it and offer to keep him in office. He is also prepared to give up Myrtle, but she tells him that his past is unimportant and they begin making plans for their future together.

== Cast in credited order ==
- William S. Hart as "Draw" Egan/William Blake
- Louise Glaum as Poppy
- Margery Wilson as Myrtle Buckton
- Robert McKim as Arizona Joe
- J.P. Lockney as Mat Buckton

== Uncredited cast listed alphabetically ==
- Dorothy Benham
- Hector Dion as William Cleves
- J. H. Gilmour
- Aggie Herring as townswoman
- Florence La Badie as Margery Carew
- Leo Willis as the townsman of Yellow Dog who gets into a fight with William Blake

== Reviews ==
A New York Times review of Monday, October 2, 1916, "Hart Film A "Thriller" --- "The Return of 'Draw' Egan" a Good Picture of the Wild West," reads:

"The Return of 'Draw' Egan," the new feature film exhibited yesterday at the Rialto, is an unusually good western picture of the William S. Hart school. It is better than most films of its type because it tells a reasonable story, or at least it tells its story convincingly, which amounts to the same thing.

Hart does this Bret Harte sort of thing so well that he must begin to fear he will spend the rest of his life in chaps and a saddle. He can draw a gun with the best road agents of fiction and can roll a cigarette with one hand and strike a match on his nails with the nonchalance of Will Rogers, so it is no wonder his director keeps him standing for closeups beside the counter of the Yellow Dog Saloon.

"The Return of 'Draw' Egan" is the story of the regeneration of a bad man through love. Egan, the mysterious masked bandit of the hills, has long been the terror of his district, but finally in the course of human events he is driven to cover and it is only by grace of an underground passage from his mountain cabin that he breaks through the iron ring of the posse.

In a distant range town his cool nerve and virtuosity with a revolver cause him to be made Marshal by the law-abiding element. He cleans up the town and has just begun to hope that his past is buried when one of his former henchmen arrives and holds the revealment of Egan's identity over his head. The accusation finally comes, and the settling of the score after the primal manner of plainsmen, is one of the most exciting sections of a film that almost equals the Fairbanks shows for the number and intensity of its fights. Of course, any audience would be terribly disappointed if Egan was not absolved and accepted by the girl, so the ending is happy."
