= Greater Than Love =

1921 film

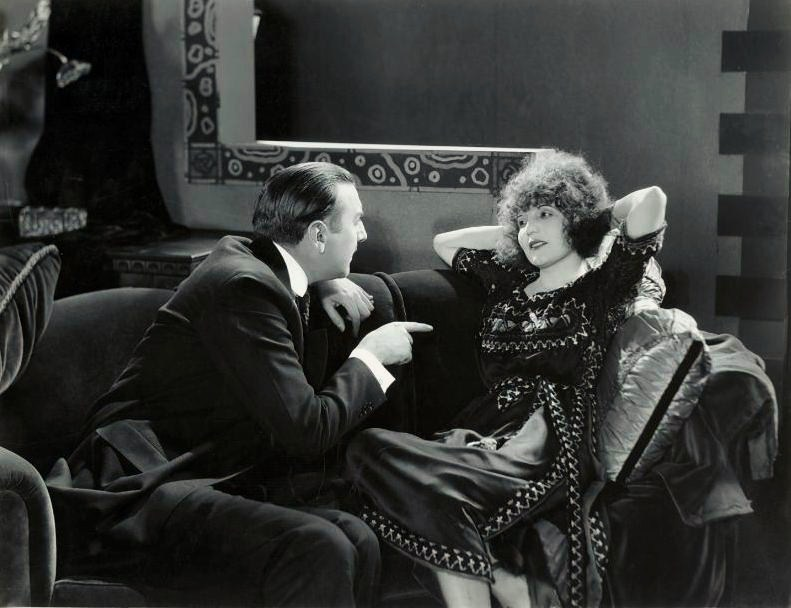
- Still of Mahlon Hamilton and Louise Glaum
- Directed by: Fred Niblo
- Written by: C. Gardner Sullivan
- Starring: Louise Glaum; Patricia Palmer
- Cinematography: Charles J. Stumar
- Distributed by: Associated Producers
- Release date: July 17, 1921
- Running time: 70 minutes
- Country: United States
- Language: Silent (English intertitles)

Greater Than Love is a 1921 American silent drama film directed by Fred Niblo. An incomplete print of the film exists in the Library of Congress.

== Cast ==
- Louise Glaum as Grace Merrill
- Patricia Palmer as Elsie Brown
- Rose Cade as Maizie
- Eve Southern as Clairice
- Willie Mae Carson as Pinkie
- Betty Francisco as Helen Wellington
- Mahlon Hamilton as Bruce Wellington
- Donald MacDonald as Elliott
- Edward Martindel as Frank Norwood
- Gertrude Claire as "Mother" Brown
