= Sex (1920 film) =

1920 American silent drama film directed by Fred Niblo

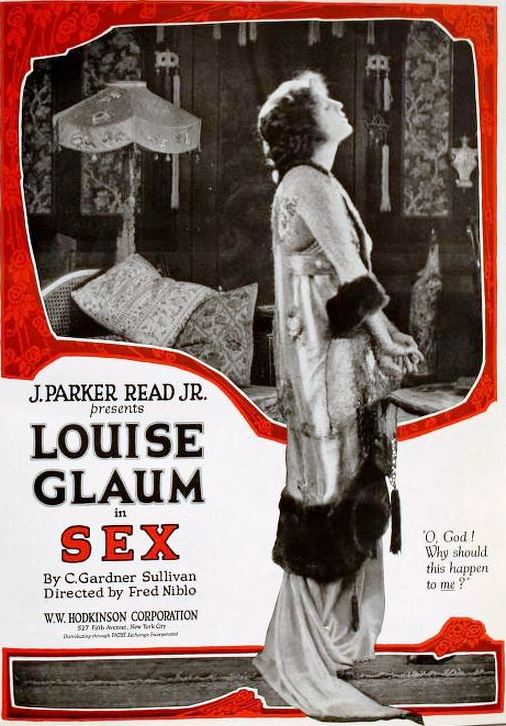
- Advertisement
- Directed by: Fred Niblo
- Written by: C. Gardner Sullivan
- Produced by: J. Parker Read; Thomas H. Ince
- Starring: Louise Glaum; Irving Cummings
- Cinematography: Charles J. Stumar
- Edited by: Ralph Dixon
- Production companies: J. Parker Read, Jr. Productions
- Distributed by: Pathé Exchange
- Release date: March 29, 1920
- Running time: 87 minutes
- Country: United States
- Language: Silent (English intertitles)

Sex is a 1920 American silent drama film directed by Fred Niblo, written by C. Gardner Sullivan, produced by J. Parker Read, and starring Louise Glaum. On its surface, the film was a morality story on the evils of marital infidelity. However, the film's producer, J. Parker Read, had made a series of pictures on sex themes. The release of Sex, with its provocative title and explicit scenes of seduction and debauchery, made it the subject of controversy among censors and commentators.

== Plot ==
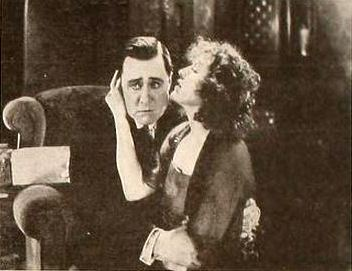
William Conklin and Louise Glaum in Sex

Sex (1920)

The film is a morality story on the evils of marital infidelity and the wild lifestyle of New York actors. At the same time, the film included scenes of seduction and debauchery that made it the subject of controversy over its prurient content.

The film's plot centers on Adrienne Renault (played by Louise Glaum), the beautiful queen of the Midnight Follies at the Frivolity Theater.

The film opens with Renault's current conquest, a married millionaire, Philip Overman (played by William Conklin). Overman is in his private box watching Renault perform her seductive "Spider Dance". Renault comes on stage dressed as a spider, "clad in a translucent cloak of webs wrapped cloak-like around a body-hugging black sheath".

In another scene of debauchery, the film depicts a party at which "stage-door johnnies drink out of women's slippers and scantily clad chorines slide down banisters, their undergarments visible to all and sundry".

The film then shifts to Mrs. Overman (played by Myrtle Stedman), home alone in her empty mansion. Her suspicions persuade her to hire a private detective to follow her husband. Eventually, Mrs. Overman uncovers her husband's infidelity. She begs Renault to release her husband, but Renault refuses, and Mrs. Overman obtains a divorce.

By this time, Renault has fallen in love with a new millionaire, Dick Wallace (played by Irving Cummings). Renault marries Wallace, but Wallace then betrays Renault, falling in love with Renault's young protege, Daisy (played by Viola Barry). It was Renault who had coached Daisy in the ways of seducing wealthy married men. Renault begs Daisy to release Wallace, harkening back to the scene where Mrs. Overmire had pleaded with Renault. As Renault had done with Mrs. Overman, Daisy refuses to release Wallace.

Renault then sails for Europe. She ends up on the same ship with the reunited Overmans, who are on a second honeymoon. The chastened Renault does nothing to disrupt the relationship, resigned to a life of solitude. The film's final intertitle reads, "The standards of morality eternally demand that the naked soul of Sex be stripped of its falsehoods – which can only be atoned for through bitter tears."

== Cast ==
- Louise Glaum as Adrienne Renault
- Irving Cummings as Dave Wallace
- Peggy Pearce as Daisy Henderson
- Myrtle Stedman as Mrs. Overman
- William Conklin as Philip Overman
- Jean Murat Minor Role (uncredited)

== Production ==
One of the unusual elements in the filming of Sex was the use of three cameras. One camera was used to produce the negative from which prints were to be made for use in the United States, and a second was used to be used for foreign prints. The third camera was "placed at an angle different from either of the others" and "was used in the expectation that a unique angle might provide a more interesting view of the dramatic action".

== Reception ==
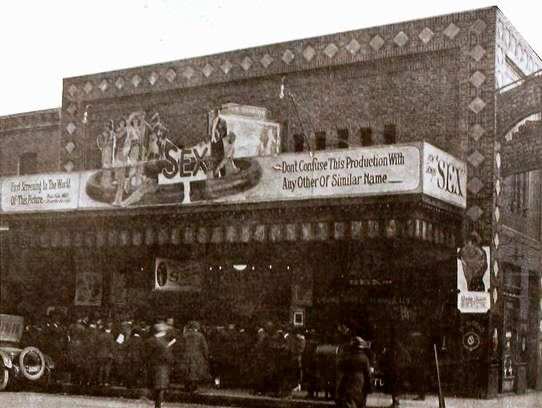
Sex at the Royal Theater in Des Moines, Iowa (May 1920)

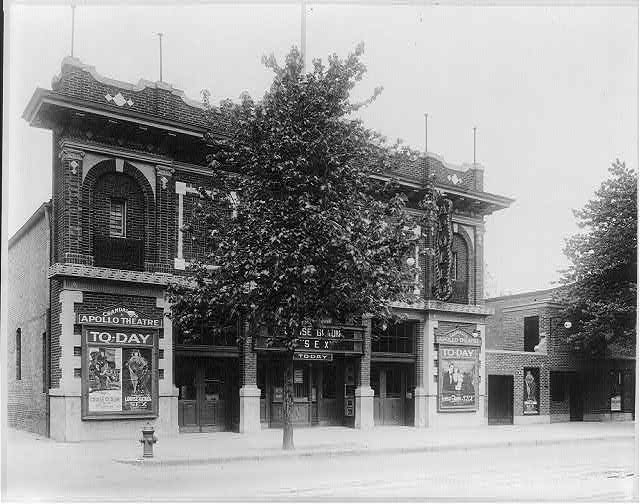
The Apollo Theater in Washington, DC in 1920 playing Sex

The film was a box office hit and received extensive coverage in the newspapers in 1920. A Massachusetts newspaper gave the film the following review:

Sex, the wonderplay of the season ... is startling, even bold in spots, but very, very nice. The picture has undeniable virtues and just as undeniable vices but they belong to the characters in the piece for 'Sex' has a 'soul.' ... A problem, beautifully presented and cleverly analyzed that leaves us with a sense of the infinite at the end -- which is distinctly unusual -- and which is entirely free from the sticky-sweet sentimentality of too many photoplays is the theme of sex. ... The art of the producer, applied with lavish, yet discriminating hand and the talents of the star make 'Sex' superlative entertainment and food for thought.

A Pennsylvania newspaper wrote: "We have heard a great deal in the past year about 'pictures with a soul' but we never quite got the significance of the 'soul-picture' until we saw 'Sex' with Louise Glaum as the star." A Chicago newspaper called it "a lesson to thousands of frivolous creatures who fool themselves into believing that youth lasts forever, that pleasure is life's chief object and that one can violate the laws that regulate our domestic lives and get away with it".

Glaum's performance as the "vampish" Renault drew extensive coverage. One reviewer called it "one of the most perfect vampire characterizations" ever given in a motion picture. Another review called Renault "a dazzling, alluring home wrecker ... who never had a qualm of conscience about taking another's husband".

When the film was screened in 2004, Los Angeles Times film critic, Kevin Thomas, wrote: "Six years before Mae West dared to call her play 'Sex', Thomas Ince produced and Fred Niblo directed a 1920 film called 'Sex', starring pioneering screen vamp Louise Glaum as a New York cabaret star, the mistress of a married man. What gives the film its edge is that in truth she is simply a blunt, honest woman who doesn't realize her own vulnerability."

== Controversy ==
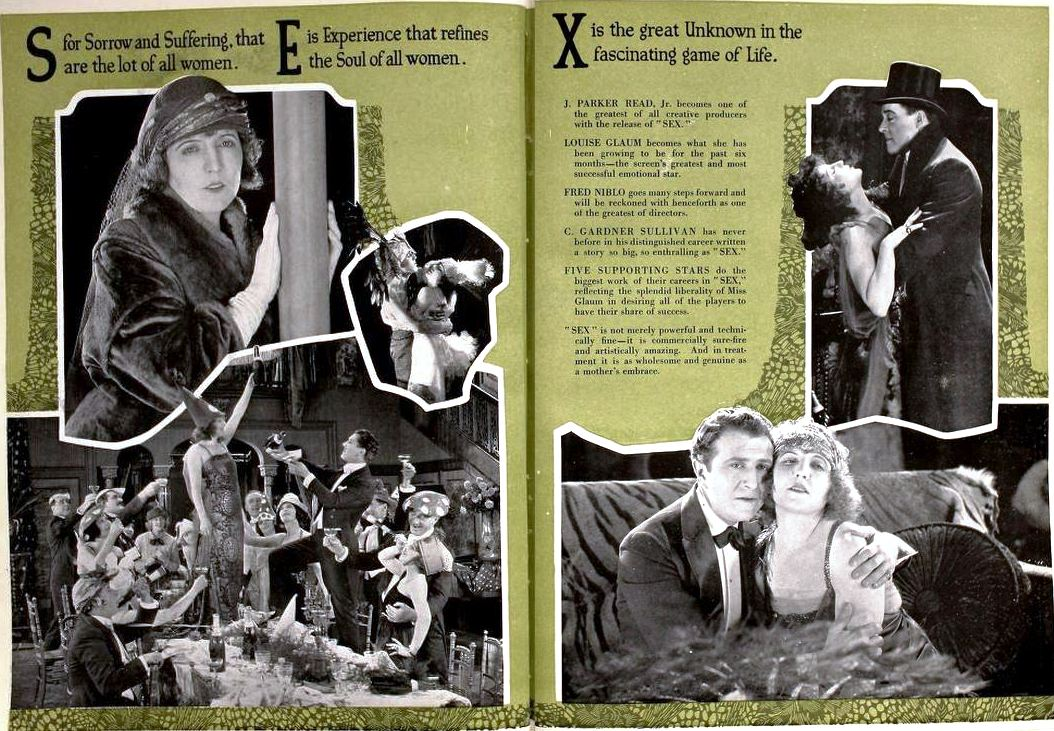
Ad in Motion Picture News (April 1920)

The film's title and subject matter were the subject of controversy in some locations. Playing off of the film's provocative title, newspaper advertising urged readers to "SEE SEX SEE SEX SEE SEX".

The Pennsylvania State Board of Motion Picture Censors refused to allow the film to be shown in Pennsylvania under its provocative title. To appease the censors, the film was distributed in Pennsylvania under the title Sex Crushed to Earth.

In Hagerstown, Maryland, the theater owner defended his showing of the film by pointing to its "social import":

Of all the social problems that beset the world that of Sex is indubitably the greatest. The 'mystery' of the sex equation has given rise to innumerable pruderies and pruriencies but Manager Thropp of the Colonial Theatre has come out flatly with the pronouncement that he has booked Sex ... because of its vast social import.

The film was a box office success, and the Los Angeles Times reported that it had led to a war being declared in some quarters against "sex pictures". Echoing the response of Sex producer, J. Parker Read, the Times in February 1921 wrote:

Sex has an important part in life either for evil or good, and it is the producers' privilege to show the error of the former and the virtue of the latter. Anybody who would wish to ban sex pictures from the screen, would be simply eliminating a highly important, if not the most important phase of life from the pictures. Thus did J. Parker Read, impresario of sensational sex films, outline his attitude toward the present agitation against pictures on sex themes.
