= Henri Diamant-Berger =

Director, producer and screenwriter

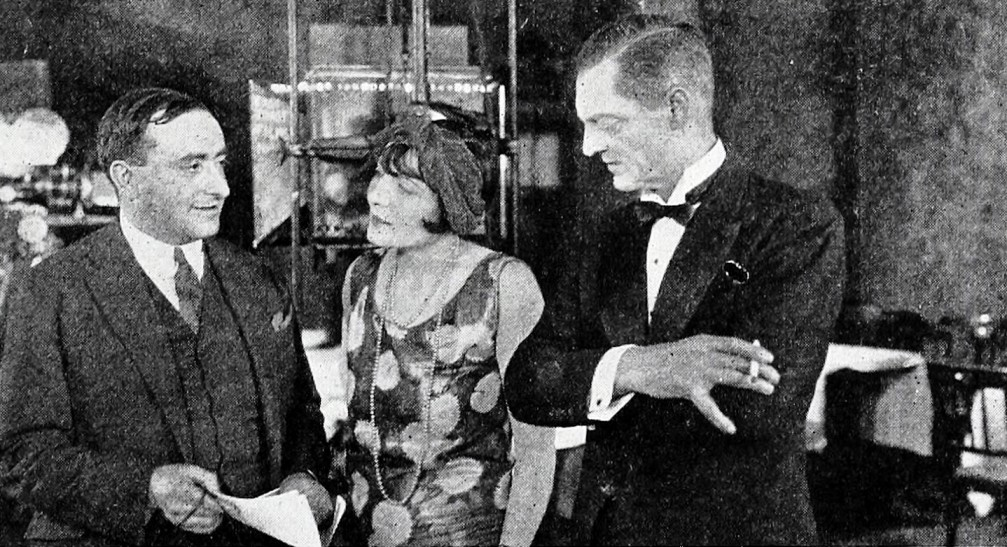
- Henri Diamant-Berger discussing a scene with Louise Glaum and Lionel Barrymore in Fifty-Fifty (1925)
- Born: 9 June 1895; Paris, France
- Died: 7 May 1972 (aged 76); Paris, France
- Occupation(s): Film director and producer, screenwriter
- Years active: 1913–1971

Henri Diamant-Berger (9 June 1895 – 7 May 1972) was a French director, producer and screenwriter. In a career that lasted more than 50 years, he directed 48 films between 1913 and 1959, produced 17 between 1925 and 1967 and wrote 21 screenplays between 1916 and 1971.

== Biography ==
Born in Paris, to a Jewish family, he studied to be a lawyer but was drawn to the motion picture business. He began his career when he co-directed the 1913 silent film short De film... en aiguilles with André Heuzé. In addition to writing screenplays, during the period from 1916 to 1919, Diamant-Berger also published and edited a film magazine and books about the movies. In 1918, he was hired by Pathé and sent to the United States to help set up the company's film laboratory at Fort Lee, New Jersey. Upon his return to France, Pathé had him set up a laboratory in Vincennes, as well as organize a film studio in Boulogne-Billancourt.

In 1921, Diamant-Berger directed the film serial Les Trois Mousquetaires, one of two film versions of Alexandre Dumas, père's novel The Three Musketeers released in 1921 (the other was Douglas Fairbanks' version) . For a short time in the mid-1920s, he made pictures in the US, including the drama Fifty-Fifty (1925) starring Lionel Barrymore. He also directed the 1927 silent film Éducation de Prince. By the end of the decade he successfully made the transition to talkies.

Through his Barrymore connection, Diamant-Berger acquired the screen rights for a play produced on Broadway in 1921 written by John Barrymore's ex-wife, Blanche Oelrichs. His French language film version of the same title, Clair de lune (1932), starred Claude Dauphin and Blanche Montel. Among his notable sound films was a remake, Les Trois Mousquetaires (1932), a six-hour epic about the three musketeers for which he wrote the screen adaptation and used much of the same cast from his 1921 silent version. Diamant-Berger's other directorial efforts include two Arsène Lupin detective films in 1937. However, after directing Tourbillon de Paris in 1939, he lost eight full years to World War II. In 1951, he directed the acclaimed drama Monsieur Fabre starring Pierre Fresnay.

During the 1960s, Diamant-Berger devoted himself exclusively to producing, making several successful films, which includes La Belle Américaine (1961), Heaven Sent (1963) and The Counterfeit Constable (1964).

Henri Diamant-Berger died at age 76 in Paris.

== Partial filmography ==
- Debout les morts!
- The Little Cafe (1919)
- My Aunt from Honfleur (1923)
- Fifty-Fifty (1925)
- Lover's Island (1925)
- The Unfair Sex (1926)
- Paris by Night (1930)
- Alone (1931)
- Ma tante d'Honfleur
- Général, à vos ordres
- Tout s'arrange (1931)
- My Aunt from Honfleur (1931)
- The Unknown Singer (1931)
- The Miracle Child (1932)
- Moonlight (1932)
- The Three Musketeers (1932)
- L'argent par les fenêtres (1933)
- Lovers and Thieves (1935)
- Arsene Lupin, Detective (1937)
- A Foolish Maiden (1938)
- Whirlwind of Paris (1939)
- The Unknown Singer (1947)
- Branquignol (1949)
- My Priest Among the Rich (1952)
- The Porter from Maxim's (1953)
- Madonna of the Sleeping Cars (1955)
- Ravishing (1960)
- My Priest Among the Poor (1956)
- It Happened on the 36 Candles (1957)
- The Bureaucrats (1959)

== See also ==
- 1913 in film
