= Associated Producers =

Defunct film production and distribution company

Associated Producers was an American film production and distribution company of the silent era.

== Overview ==
Inspired by the foundation of United Artists, the company brought together a group of leading film directors who hoped running their own company would given them greater financial and artistic control over their work. Those involved with the outfit included Allan Dwan, Marshall Neilan, Maurice Tourneur, Thomas H. Ince, Mack Sennett and George Loane Tucker

== History ==
Established in late 1919, the company chose not to release their films through United Artists as widely expected but to handle their own distribution. It was also announced that any other directors wishing to join the company would be welcomed. Future director Howard Hawks became involved raising finances for several pictures for the company.

The company announced plans to have at least thirty releases in its first year. Before long, however, this proved to be too ambitious a target. Many of the directors were still under contract to produce films for other studios before they could start work for Associated Producers. One of the most financially successful of the company's releases was Maurice Tourneur's The Last of the Mohicans. Otherwise the company was struggling financially, and according to Variety was losing $5,000 a day by summer 1921.

== Liquidation ==
Eventually the company abandoned its idea of independent releasing, and signed a deal for its films to be handled by First National Pictures. Soon afterwards production was stopped completely.

== Filmography ==
- Soldiers of Fortune (1919)
- The Luck of the Irish (1920)
- Love (1920)
- Homespun Folks (1920)
- The Last of the Mohicans (1920)
- The Leopard Woman (1920)
- The Forbidden Thing (1920)
- A Thousand to One (1920)
- Lying Lips (1921)
- A Small Town Idol (1921)
- A Perfect Crime (1921)
- I Am Guilty (1921)
- Mother o' Mine (1921)
- A Broken Doll (1921)
- The Ten Dollar Raise (1921)
- The Foolish Matrons (1921)
- Greater Than Love (1921)
- Devotion (1921)
- The Cup of Life (1921)
- Pilgrims of the Night (1921)
- Blind Hearts (1921)
- Love Never Dies (1921)
- Hail the Woman (1921)
- The Sea Lion (1921)

== Bibliography ==
- Lombardi, Frederic. Allan Dwan and the Rise and Decline of the Hollywood Studios. McFarland, 2013.
- Slide, Anthony. The New Historical Dictionary of the American Film Industry. Routledge, 2014.
