= The Leopard Woman =

1920 film by Wesley Ruggles

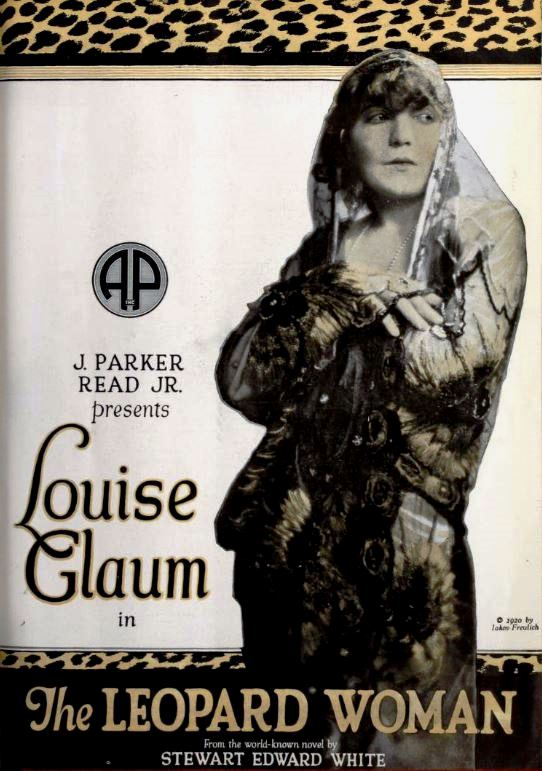
- Advertisement
- Directed by: Wesley Ruggles
- Written by: H. Tipton Steck; Stanley C. Morse
- Based on: The Leopard Woman by Stewart Edward White
- Produced by: J. Parker Read, Jr.
- Starring: Louise Glaum; House Peters; Noble Johnson
- Cinematography: Charles J. Stumar
- Edited by: Ralph H. Dixon
- Production company: Thomas H. Ince Studios
- Distributed by: Associated Producers
- Release date: October 1920
- Running time: 70 minutes
- Country: United States
- Language: Silent (English intertitles)

The Leopard Woman is a 1920 American silent adventure romance drama film starring Louise Glaum, House Peters, and Noble Johnson. Directed by Wesley Ruggles and produced by J. Parker Read, Jr., the screenplay was adapted by H. Tipton Steck and Stanley C. Morse based on the novel The Leopard Woman (1916) by Stewart Edward White.

== Plot ==
The story is set in Africa. Two rival European governments have sent secret agents to the uncivilized kingdom of M'tela. British agent John Culbertson (played by Peters) survives an attempt on his life and leads a safari from Bajuma, on the edge of the desert, to the savage kingdom.

An agent of the rival government, Madame (played by Glaum), who is known as the "Leopard Woman," is also leading a safari to M'tela. Her mission is to prevent the Englishman from reaching the kingdom. The two parties meet in the desert. The Leopard Woman's men are exhausted and dehydrated and she is forced to seek Culbertson's help. The Leopard Woman then feigns illness and manages to fulfill her promise to delay Culbertson. Although her government has given her orders to kill him, she falls in love with him. After they make love, he spurns her. She is enraged and orders her servant, Chaké (played by Johnson), to kill him. The attempt fails, however, and the Leopard Woman is relieved. She has decided that she really loves him after all.

Culbertson then loses his sight due to overexposure to the sun and his progress is delayed further. The Leopard Woman smashes his bottle of medicine in the hope of forcing him to return to Bajuma. Despite his blindness, Culbertson is determined to complete his mission and goes on to M'tela. With the help of a record player, Culbertson forms an alliance between the primitive tribe and Britain. Choosing love over her duty as a foreign rival, the Leopard Woman sends Chaké to find the British military surgeon. When his sight is restored, Culbertson declares his love for her.

== Cast ==
- Louise Glaum as Madame, the Leopard Woman
- House Peters as John Culbertson
- Noble Johnson as Chaké, Madame's servant
- Benny Ayers
- Nathan Curry
- Cesare Gravina as an Arab (uncredited)
- Alfred Hollingsworth in an undetermined role (uncredited)

== Production ==
The first release of Associated Producers, Inc., the movie was filmed at Thomas H. Ince Studios in Culver City. Additional scenes were shot in the desert near Palm Springs. According to news items of the day, the cast included "several hundred Africans, Egyptians and others."

== Reviews ==
A Los Angeles Times review of Thursday, December 9, 1920, reads:

"The Leopard Woman, romance of intrigue, conquest and mystery, is at the Walker Theater. Louise Glaum appears as the seductive enchantress whose wiles fall short of their mark when love destroys her aim. The photoplay was made from Stewart Edward White's story of the African veldt, and has been given a picturesque setting. Playing opposite the star is House Peters, who gives a delineation of the American scientist-explorer whose duty is stronger than love."

== See also ==
- List of American films of 1920
