= The Weaker Sex (1917 film) =

1917 film directed by Raymond B. West

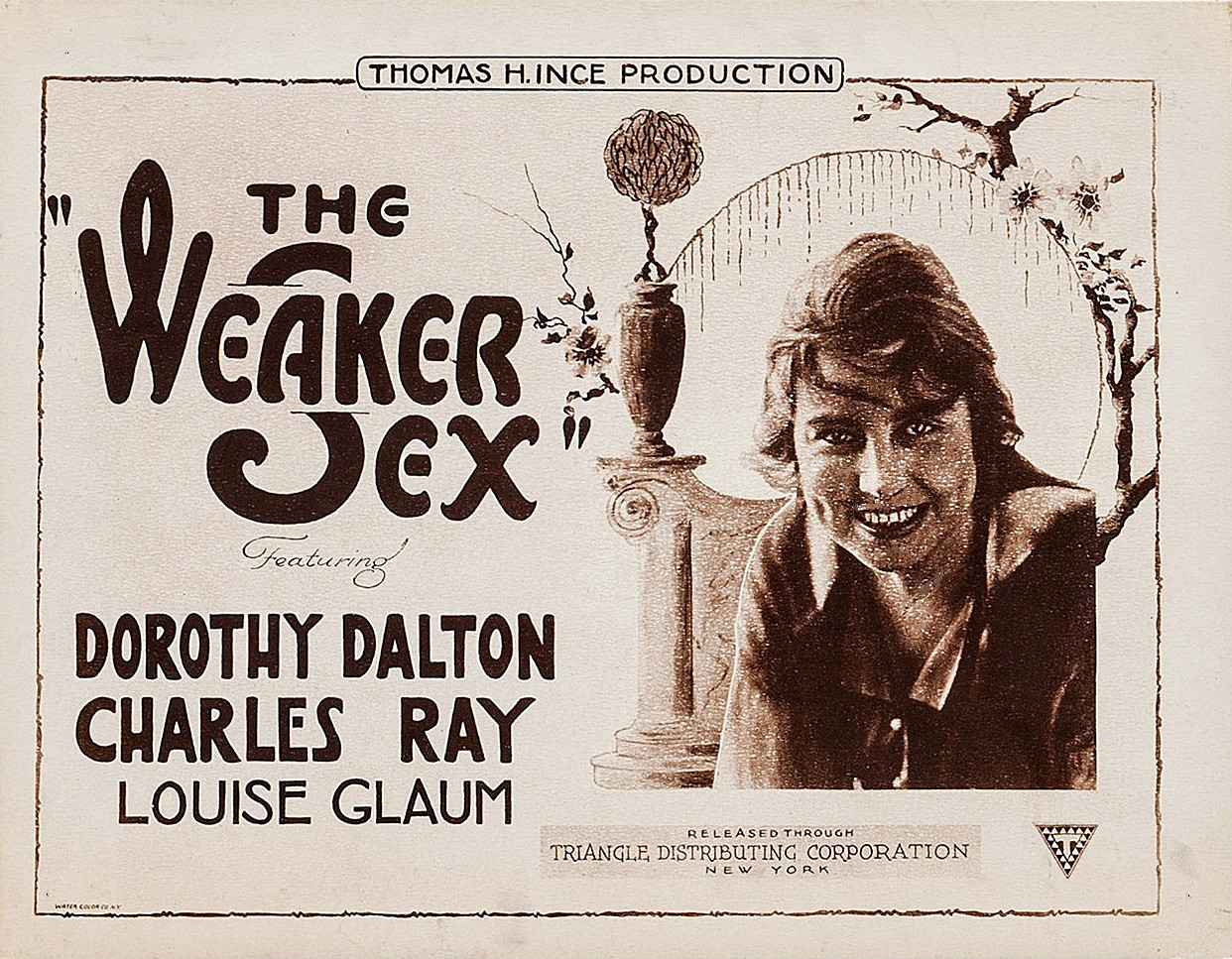
- Directed by: Raymond B. West
- Written by: Alice C. Brown; Monte M. Katterjohn
- Produced by: Thomas H. Ince
- Starring: Dorothy Dalton; Louise Glaum; Charles Ray
- Cinematography: Dal Clawson
- Production companies: Kay-Bee Pictures; New York Motion Picture
- Distributed by: Triangle Distributing
- Release date: January 7, 1917
- Running time: 50 minutes
- Country: United States
- Languages: Silent; English intertitles

The Weaker Sex is a 1917 American silent drama film directed by Raymond B. West and starring Dorothy Dalton, Louise Glaum and Charles Ray.

== Cast ==
- Dorothy Dalton as Ruth Tilden
- Louise Glaum as Annette Loti
- Charles Ray as Jack Harding
- Robert McKim as Raoul Bozen
- Charles K. French as John Harding
- Margaret Thompson as Marjory Lawton
- J. Barney Sherry as Edward Tilden
- Nona Thomas as Mary Wheeler
- John Gilbert as Minor role

== Bibliography ==
- Golden, Eve. John Gilbert: The Last of the Silent Film Stars. University Press of Kentucky, 2013.
