= Borrowed Plumage =

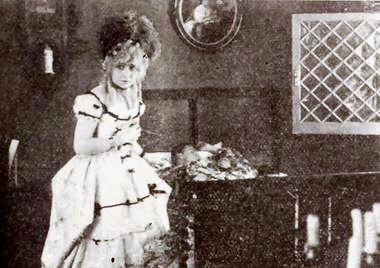
- Still from the film
- Directed by: Raymond B. West
- Written by: J. G. Hawks
- Produced by: Thomas H. Ince
- Starring: Bessie Barriscale
- Cinematography: Charles Stumar
- Production company: Triangle Film Corporation
- Distributed by: Triangle Distributing
- Release date: July 29, 1917
- Running time: 5 reels
- Country: United States
- Languages: Silent film English intertitles

Borrowed Plumage is a 1917 American silent comedy adventure film directed by Raymond B. West and starring Bessie Barriscale. It was produced by the Triangle Film Corporation.

== Cast ==
- Bessie Barriscale as Nora
- Arthur Maude as Darby O'Donovan
- Dorcas Matthews as Lady Angelica
- J. Barney Sherry (credited as Barney Sherry) as Earl of Selkirk
- Wallace Worsley as Sir Charles Broome
- Tod Burns as Giles

== Preservation ==
An incomplete 35 mm print of Borrowed Plumage is held by the Library of Congress. One reel of the film is considered lost.
