= Love Madness (film) =

1920 film

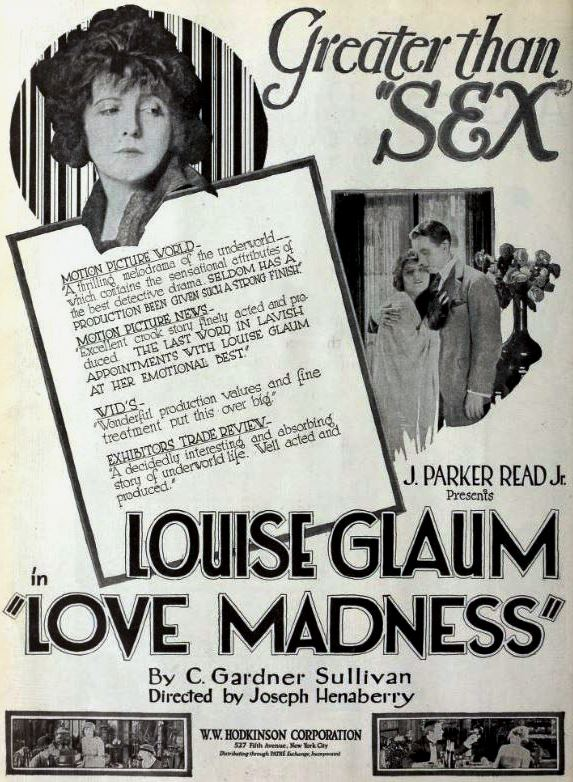
- Advertisement
- Directed by: Joseph Henabery
- Written by: C. Gardner Sullivan
- Produced by: J. Parker Read Jr.
- Starring: Louise Glaum; Matt Moore; Noah Beery
- Cinematography: Charles J. Stumar
- Edited by: Ralph Dixon
- Production company: J. Parker Read Jr. Productions
- Distributed by: Hodkinson Pictures; Pathé Exchange
- Release date: August 29, 1920
- Running time: 90 minutes
- Country: United States
- Language: Silent (English intertitles)

Love Madness is a 1920 American silent crime film directed by Joseph Henabery and starring Louise Glaum, Matt Moore, and Noah Beery.

== Plot ==
As described in a film magazine review, Mary Norwood's husband, a weakling, is framed by a gang of crooks and sent to prison to die for a murder he has not committed. His wife, believing implicitly in his innocence, assumes the role of a confidence woman, gets in with the gang, learns the truth by playing one gang member against the other for her affections. She has them arrested and frees her husband, who has become regenerated through the ordeal and emerges a bigger and better man.

== Cast ==
- Louise Glaum as Mary Norwood
- Matt Moore as Lloyd Norwood
- William Conklin as Joe the Swell
- Noah Beery as Jack Frost
- Jack Nelson as Pussyfoot Connor
- Arthur Millett as William B. Ashford
- Peggy Pearce as Goldie Lewis

== Bibliography ==
- Connelly, Robert B. The Silents: Silent Feature Films, 1910-36, Volume 40, Issue 2. December Press, 1998.
