= Fifty-Fifty (1925 film) =

1925 film directed by Henri Diamant-Berger

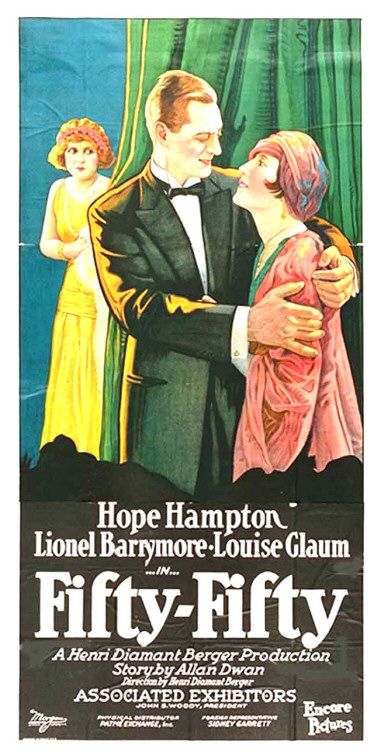
- Film poster
- Directed by: Henri Diamant-Berger
- Written by: Allan Dwan (original story)
- Produced by: Henri Diamant-Berger
- Starring: Hope Hampton; Lionel Barrymore; Louise Glaum
- Cinematography: Henry Cronjager
- Production company: Encore Pictures
- Distributed by: Associated Exhibitors
- Release date: November 15, 1925
- Running time: 50 minutes (5 reels)
- Country: United States
- Language: Silent (English intertitles)

Fifty-Fifty is a 1925 American silent drama film starring Hope Hampton, Lionel Barrymore, and Louise Glaum. Directed and produced by Henri Diamant-Berger for the production company Encore Pictures, Fifty-Fifty is a remake of a 1916 Norma Talmadge film also titled Fifty-fifty that was directed by Allan Dwan, who wrote the original story.

The film was exhibited the week of January 3, 1926, in Los Angeles, at the Hillstreet Theatre, which featured both vaudeville and movies.

== Plot ==
American millionaire Frederick Harmon (played by Lionel Barrymore) is in Paris, France, for business and pleasure. While enjoying the Parisian night life, he meets and falls in love with Ginette (played by Hope Hampton), a fashion model who moonlights as an apache dancer in a nightclub.

They marry and he returns to New York with her. When Harmon meets the urbane divorcee Nina Olmstead (played by Louise Glaum) he becomes involved in an affair. Ginette discovers her husband's infidelity and decides to win him back by going out with an old boyfriend, Jean (played by Jean Del Val), a member of the Paris underworld.

Nina schemes to end the marriage of the Harmons using the seeming romance between Ginette and Jean. Harmon learns of Nina's treachery and her attempt to estrange the couple fails. He realizes that Ginette was merely trying to make him jealous and that he completely trusts her loyalty to him. They are happily reconciled.

== Cast ==
- Hope Hampton as Ginette
- Lionel Barrymore as Frederick Harmon
- Louise Glaum as Nina Olmstead
- J. Moy Bennett as Charles O'Malley
- Arthur Donaldson as Grand Duke Popovitch
- Jean Del Val as Jean
- Josephine Norman

== Preservation ==
With no prints of Fifty-Fifty located in any film archives, it is a lost film.
