= The Aryan =

1916 film directed by William S. Hart

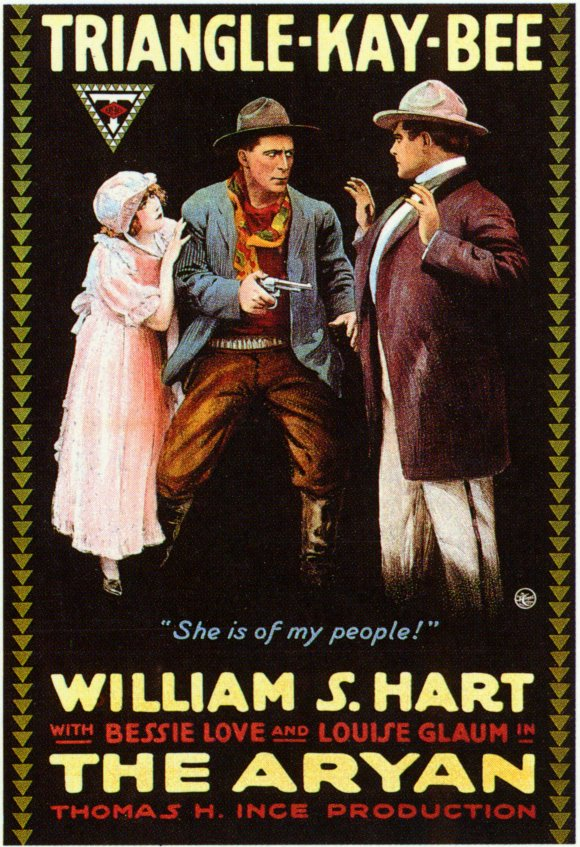
- Theatrical poster
- Directed by: William S. Hart
- Written by: C. Gardner Sullivan
- Produced by: Thomas H. Ince
- Starring: William S. Hart; Bessie Love; Louise Glaum; Charles K. French; Gertrude Claire
- Cinematography: Joseph H. August
- Production company: Triangle Film Corporation
- Release date: April 9, 1916 (U.S.)
- Running time: 50 minutes; 5 reels
- Country: United States
- Language: Silent (English intertitles)
- Budget: $13,500

The Aryan is a 1916 American silent Western film starring William S. Hart, Gertrude Claire, Charles K. French, Louise Glaum, and Bessie Love.

The film was directed primarily by William S. Hart and produced by Thomas H. Ince, with Hart also starring in the lead role. Though assisted by Reginald Barker and Clifford Smith, Hart largely oversaw the direction himself. His combined salary as actor and director was $150 per week (equivalent to $4,000 in 2025).

A partial print of the film survives in the Library of Congress, and was restored at the Museo del Cine Pablo Ducrós Hicken in Buenos Aires, Argentina.

== Plot ==
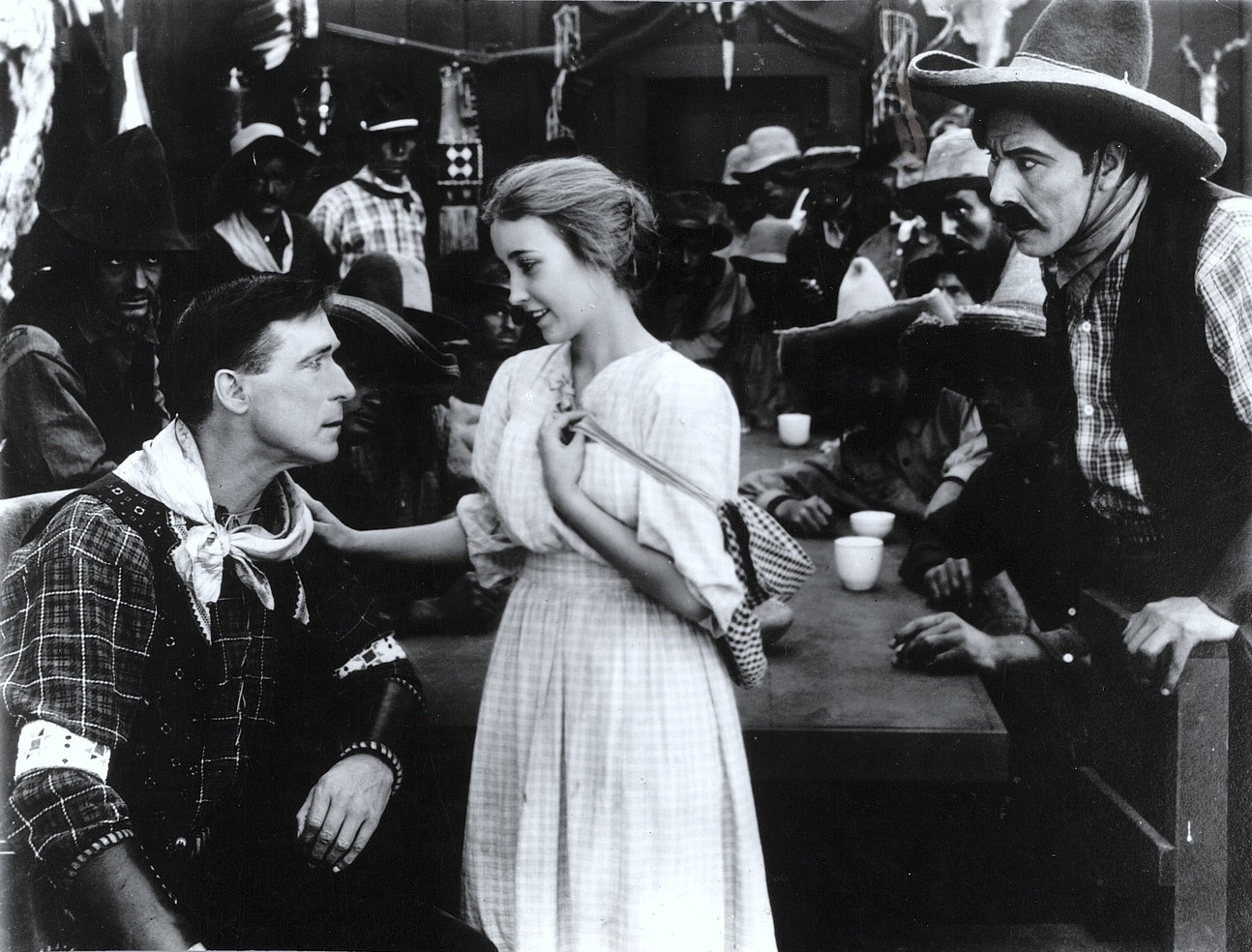
Denton (Hart) and Mary Jane (Love)

A hardworking miner, Steve Denton, has become wealthy after years of prospecting. He sets out to visit his ailing mother, Mrs. Denton.

In the town of Yellow Ridge, however, he becomes entangled with a dance hall girl named Trixie, known as "the firefly." Trixie swindles him out of his gold and intercepts a telegram informing him of his mother's condition.

The following day, Denton learns that his mother has died. Devastated and enraged by Trixie's deception and what he sees as the betrayal of those around him, he kills her lover, Chip Emmett, and abducts her. Dragging her by the hair, he takes her into the desert. There, in isolation, he enslaves Trixie and renounces "white civilization." He declares hatred for white men and women, and assumes command of a group of Indian and Mexican bandits.

Two years later, a wagon train of lost and dying Mississippi farmers appeals to Denton for help. He refuses. That night, Mary Jane Garth, an innocent and courageous young woman among the migrants, visits him in secret and pleads their case. She declares her belief that no white man would abandon a woman in need.

Her words stir Denton. He is moved to act, and guides the wagon train to safety. Once their survival is secured, he resumes his solitary life in the desert.

The Aryan (1916)

== Cast ==
- William S. Hart as Steve Denton
- Gertrude Claire as Mrs. Denton
- Charles K. French as "Ivory" Wells
- Bessie Love as Mary Jane Garth
- Louise Glaum as Trixie, "the firefly"
- Herschel Mayall as Chip Emmett
- Ernest Swallow as Mexican Pete
- Enid Bennett
- Jean Hersholt
- John Gilbert as an extra (uncredited)

=== Cast notes ===
Hart later reflected on his performance:

I think the most disagreeable part I ever had was in The Aryan. It was hard for me to really feel it, being that of a white man, forswearing his race, makes outlaw Mexicans his comrades, and allows white women to be attacked by them. It is difficult to put all one's decent instincts aside and live and think as such a despicable character must have done. But by allowing myself only to think of the terrible wrong that the white race had done me—pure imagery—I settled into it, and I am sure Bessie Love at the time believed I was the typical brute.

— "Living Your Character" in Motion Picture Magazine, May 1917

== Production ==
Hart initially rejected the screenplay by C. Gardner Sullivan for lacking a clear motive behind the protagonist's harsh demeanor. He pushed for an explanation that would make the character's cruelty believable. Sullivan eventually agreed.

Although silent, the script included long speeches, which were filmed and edited down.

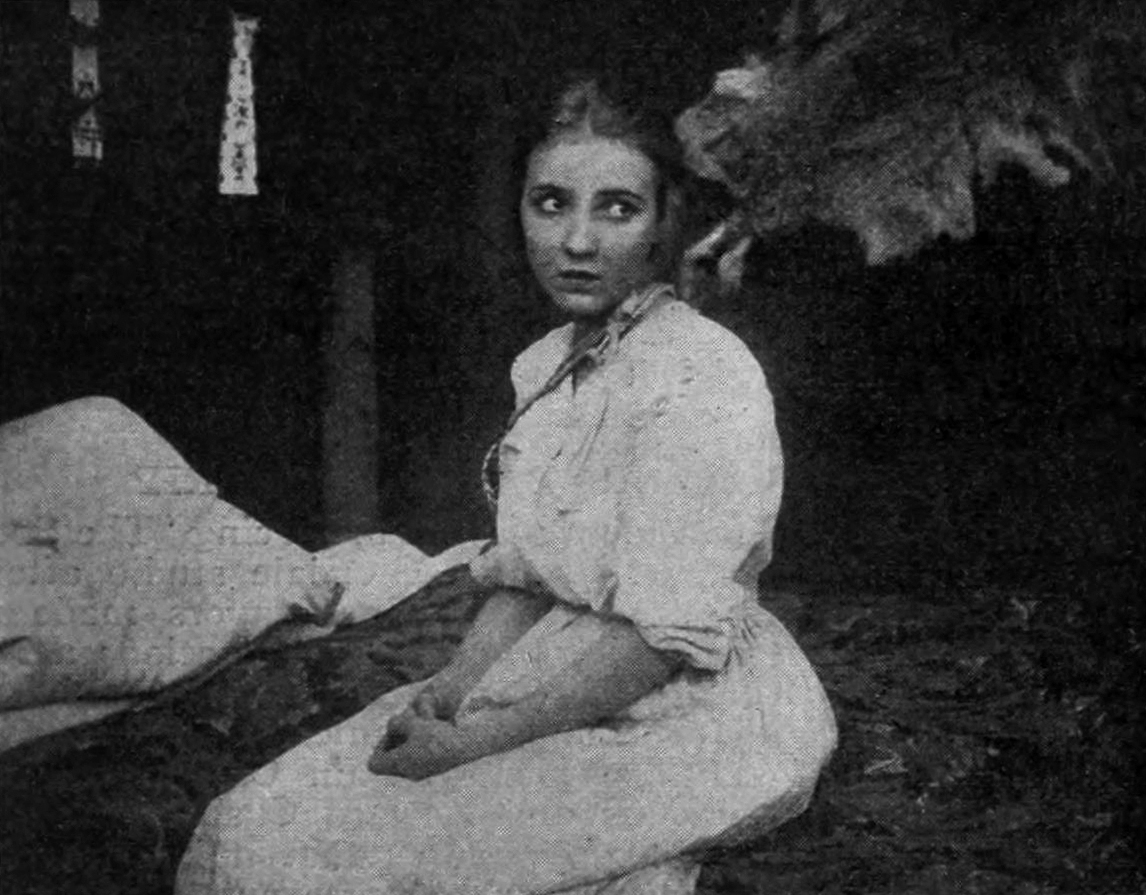
Love as Mary Jane Garth

Hart wanted Mae Marsh for the role of Mary Jane, but she was unavailable. D. W. Griffith suggested newcomer Bessie Love.

The film was produced during the height of Hart's career, but was notable for casting him as a severe and unsympathetic figure. The title reflects the racial ideologies common in early 20th-century American cinema. Hart later described the character of Steve Denton as "a white man who, foreswearing his race, makes outlaw Mexicans his comrades and allows white women to be attacked by them."

Filming took place at Inceville and in Sulphur Canyon.

== Reception ==
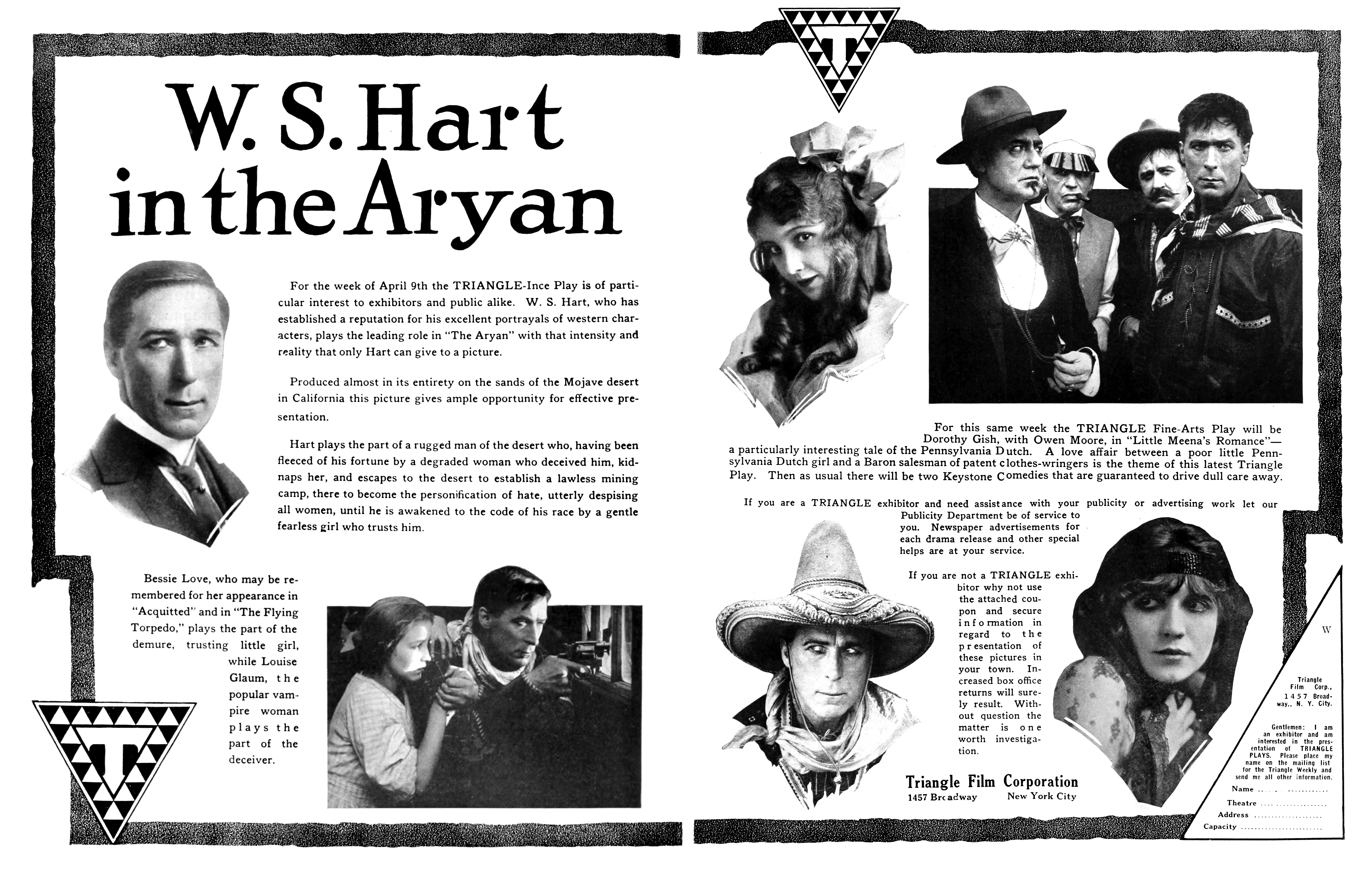
Magazine advertisement

Early reviews were highly positive. Acting, cinematography, and direction were praised. Hart himself considered it one of his finest Westerns.

More recent evaluations have criticized the film's racial themes. Scholar Andrew Brodie Smith called it "a sophisticated expression of racism in the Western genre." Others have identified it as one of the first films to explicitly endorse white supremacy over Native Americans.

== See also ==
- Racism in early American film
- Whitewashing in film
