= Sessue Hayakawa filmography =

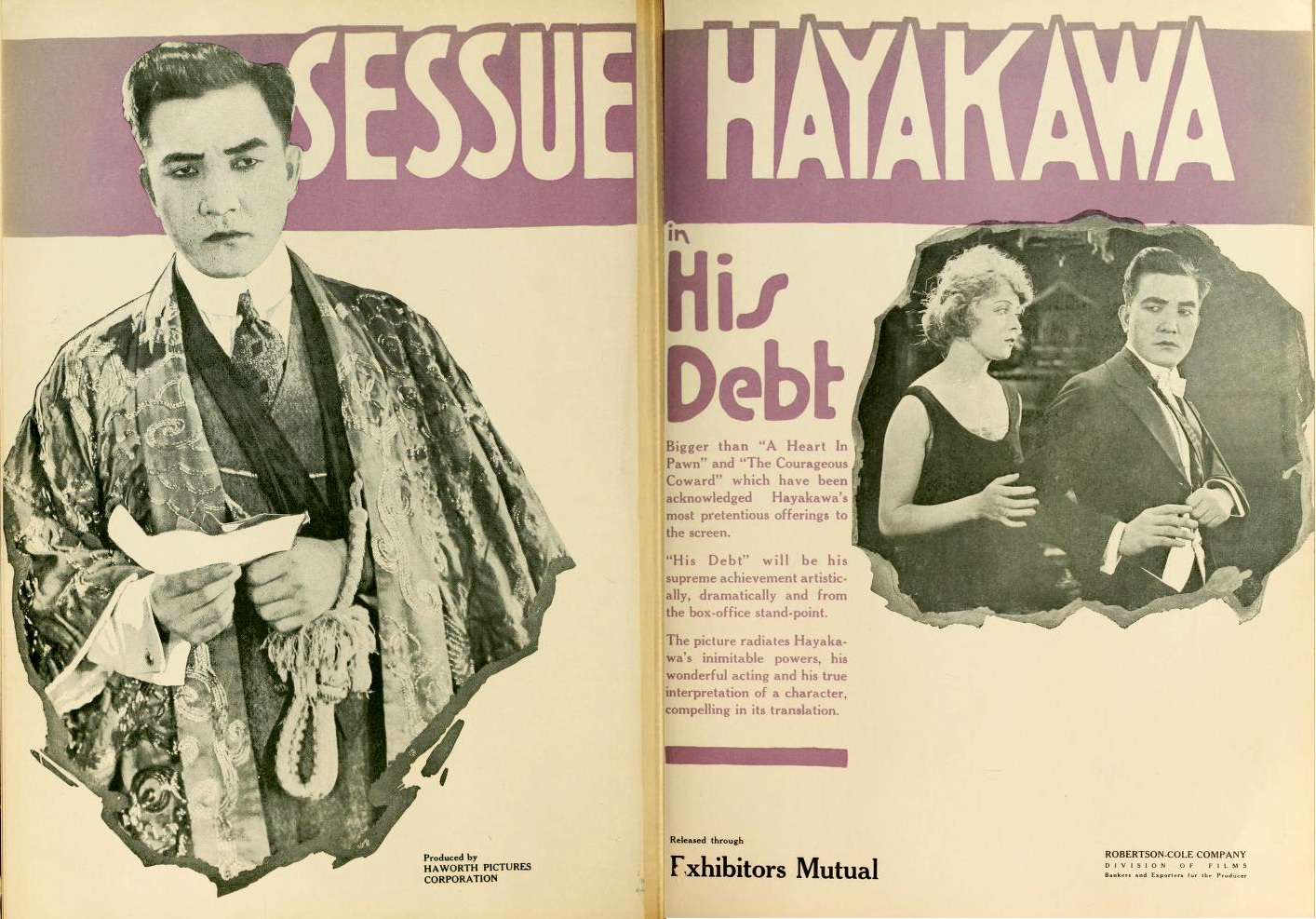
Advertisement in Moving Picture World, May 1919.

Sessue Hayakawa (June 10, 1886 – November 23, 1973) was one of the first Asian actors and filmmakers to gain great fame and success in the United States. He starred in both English-language and Japanese-language films. His career peaked during the silent film period but continued on and eventually thrived in the talkie era, culminating with an Academy Award-nominated performance in The Bridge on the River Kwai in 1957.

Key
†	Denotes a lost or presumed lost film.

== Early work ==
Year	Title	Role	Director	Notes
1914	O Mimi San	Yorotomo	Charles Miller	Two reels
1914	The Courtship of O San †	Shotoku	Charles Miller	Two reels
1914	The Geisha †	Takura	Raymond B. West	Two reels
1914	The Ambassador's Envoy †	Kamuri		Two reels
1914	A Tragedy of the Orient †	Kato	Reginald Barker	Two reels
1914	A Relic of Old Japan †	Koto	Reginald Barker	Two reels
1914	The Curse of Caste †	Kato	Reginald Barker	Two reels
1914	The Village 'Neath the Sea †	Red Elk	Thomas H. Ince; Jay Hunt	Two reels
1914	Star of the North †		Thomas H. Ince; Jay Hunt	Two reels
1914	The Death Mask †	Running Wolf	Thomas H. Ince	Two reels
1914	The Hateful God †	Unconfirmed	Scott Sidney	Two reels
1914	Nipped †	Taro Kamura	George Osborne	Two reels
1914	The Vigil †	Kenjiro	George Osborne	Two reels
1914	Mother of the Shadows †	Running Elk	George Osborne	Two reels
1914	The Last of the Line	Tiah - Gray Otter's Son	Jay Hunt	Two reels
1914	The Typhoon	Tokorama	Reginald Barker	
1914	The Wrath of the Gods	Lord Yamaki	Reginald Barker	
1914	The Sacrifice †			
1915	The Famine †	Horisho	George Osborne	One reel
1915	The Chinatown Mystery †	Yo Hong	Reginald Barker	Two reels

== Famous Player Lasky Films ==
Year	Title	Role	Director	Notes
1915	After Five †	Oki - the Valet	Cecil B. DeMille; Oscar Apfel	
1915	The Clue †	Nogi	James Neill; Frank Reicher	
1915	The Secret Sin	Lin Foo	Frank Reicher	
1915	The Cheat	Hishuru Tori (original release) / Haka Arakau	Cecil B. DeMille	
1915	Temptation †	Opera Admirer	Cecil B. DeMille	
1916	Alien Souls †	Sakata	Frank Reicher	
1916	The Honorable Friend †	Makino	Edward LeSaint	
1916	The Soul of Kura San †	Toyo	Edward LeSaint	
1916	The Victoria Cross	Azimoolah	Edward LeSaint	
1917	Each to His Kind †	Rhandah	Edward LeSaint	
1917	The Bottle Imp	Lopaka	Marshall Neilan	
1917	The Jaguar's Claws †	El Jaguar	Marshall Neilan	
1917	Forbidden Paths	Sato		
1917	Hashimura Togo †	Hashimura Togo		
1917	The Call of the East †	Arai Takada	George Melford	
1917	The Secret Game	Nara-Nara	William C. deMille	
1918	The Hidden Pearls †	Tom Garvin		
1918	The Honor of His House †	Count Ito Onato	William C. deMille	
1918	The White Man's Law	John A. Genghis	James Young	
1918	The Bravest Way †	Kara Tamura	George Melford	
1918	The City of Dim Faces †	Jang Lung	George Melford	

== Haworth Pictures Corporation ==
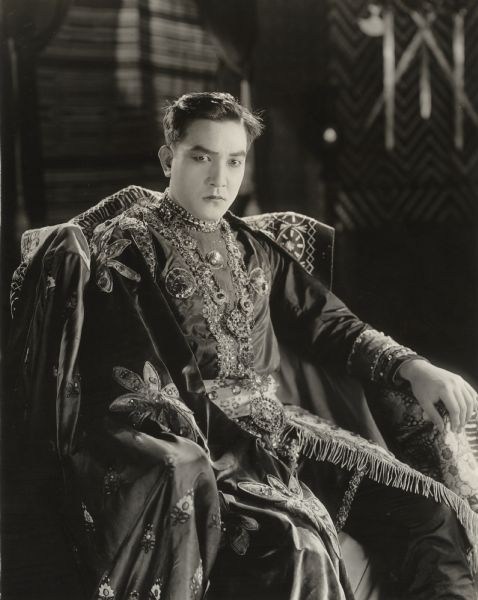
Sessue Hayakawa is costumed as the Prince of the Island of Desire in a publicity still for the 1920 silent fantasy film The Beggar Prince.

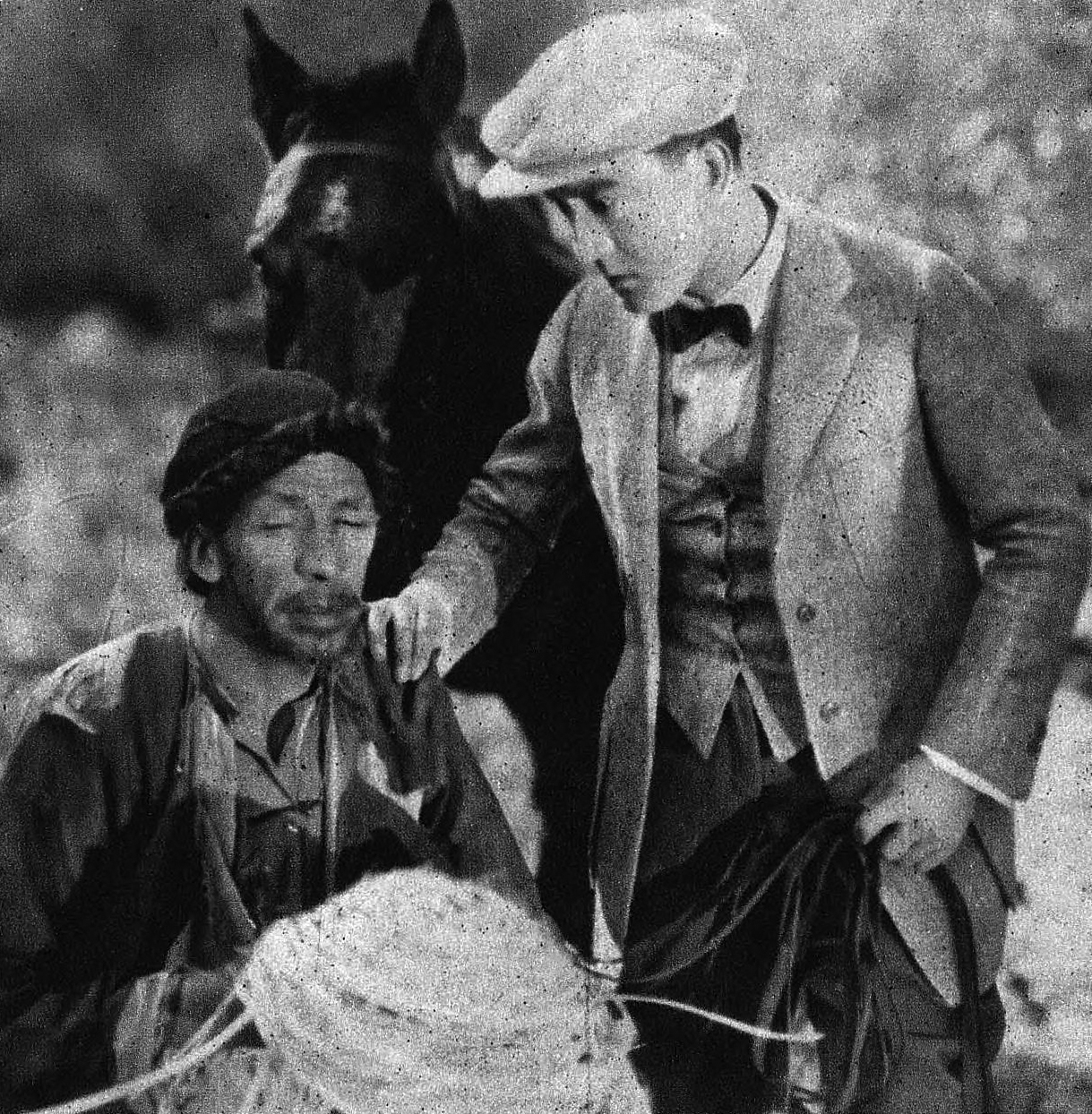
Omar Whitehead and Sessue Hayakawa in The Vermilion Pencil (1922)

Year	Title	Role	Director	Notes
1918	His Birthright	Yukio	William Worthington	Incomplete; Served as writer
1918	Banzai †	The American General		One reel
1918	The Temple of Dusk †	Akira	James Young	
1919	A Heart in Pawn †	Tomaya	William Worthington	
1919	The Courageous Coward †	Suki Iota	William Worthington	
1919	His Debt †	Goto Mariyama	William Worthington	
1919	The Man Beneath	Dr. Chindi Ashutor	William Worthington	
1919	The Gray Horizon †	Yamo Masata	William Worthington	
1919	The Dragon Painter	Tatsu - the Dragon Painter	William Worthington	
1919	Bonds of Honor †	Yamashito / Sasamoto	William Worthington	
1919	The Illustrious Prince †	Prince Maiyo	William Worthington	
1919	The Tong Man	Luk Chen	William Worthington	
1920	The Beggar Prince †	Nikki / Prince	William Worthington	
1920	The Brand of Lopez †	Vasco Lopez	Joseph De Grasse	
1920	The Devil's Claim	Akbar Khan / Hassan	Charles Swickard	
1920	Li Ting Lang	Li Ting Lang	Charles Swickard	
1920	An Arabian Knight †	Ahmed	Charles Swickard	
1921	The First Born	Chan Wang		Served as producer
1921	Black Roses	Yoda	Colin Campbell	Served as producer
1921	Where Lights Are Low †	Tsu Wong Shih	Colin Campbell	Served as producer
1921	The Swamp	Wang	Colin Campbell	Served as producer and writer
1922	Five Days to Live †	Tai Leung	Norman Dawn	
1922	The Vermilion Pencil †	Tse Chan / The Unknown / Li Chan		

== European, American and Japanese Films ==
Year	Title	Role	Director	Notes
1923	La Bataille †	Le Marquis Yorisaka	Himself; Édouard-Émile Violet	French film Served as producer
1924	The Great Prince Shan †	Prince Shan	A. E. Coleby	British film
1924	The Danger Line †	Marquis Yorisaka	Édouard-Émile Violet	American film
1924	Sen Yan's Devotion †	Sen Yan	A. E. Coleby	British film
1924	I Have Killed	Hideo - l'antiquaire japonais		French film
1929	The Man Who Laughed Last			Short film. Early talking film for Sessue Hayakawa
1931	Daughter of the Dragon	Ah Kee	Lloyd Corrigan	American film
1932	Taiyo wa higashi yori	Kenji		Japanese film
1934	Bakugeki hikôtai			Japanese film
1935	Tojin Okichi	Townsend Harris		Japanese film
1935	Kuni o mamoru mono: Nichiren	Nichiren		Japanese film
1937	The Daughter of the Samurai	Iwao Yamato	Arnold Fanck; Mansaku Itami	German-Japanese Film
1937	Yoshiwara	Ysamo, Kuli	Max Ophüls	French film
1937	The Cheat	Prince Hu-Long	Marcel L'Herbier	French film
1938	Storm over Asia	Le prince Ling	Richard Oswald	French film
1942	White Patrol	Halloway		French film
1942	Macao	Ying Tchaï		French film
1943	Malaria	Saïdi	Jean Gourguet	French film
1943	The Midnight Sun	Matsui	Bernard-Roland	French film
1946	Le Cabaret du grand large	Professeur Wang		French film
1947	Chinese Quarter	Tchang		French film

== Final films ==
Year	Title	Role	Director	Notes
1949	Tokyo Joe	Baron Kimura	Stuart Heisler	
1950	Three Came Home	Col. Mitsuo Suga	Jean Negulesco	
1950	Harukanari haha no kuni	Joe Hayami		Japanese film
1950	Re mizeraburu: kami to akuma			Japanese film
1950	Re mizeraburu: kami to jiyu no hata			Japanese film
1953	Onna kanja himon - Akô rôshi	Sakon Tachibana		Japanese film
1953	Kurama Tengu to Katsu Kaishû	Awanokami Katsu		Japanese film
1954	Nihon yaburezu			Japanese film
1955	House of Bamboo	Insp. Kita	Samuel Fuller	Dubbed by Richard Loo
1957	The Bridge on the River Kwai	Colonel Saito	David Lean	Nomination - Academy Award for Best Supporting Actor
1958	The Geisha Boy	Mr. Sikita	Frank Tashlin	
1959	Green Mansions	Runi	Mel Ferrer	
1960	Hell to Eternity	Gen. Matsui	Phil Karlson	
1960	Swiss Family Robinson	Kuala, Pirate Chief	Ken Annakin	
1961	The Big Wave	The Old Man	Tad Danielewski	
1966	The Daydreamer	The Mole	Jules Bass	Voice role
1967	Junjô nijûsô	Tajima		Japanese film

== Appearances as himself ==
Year	Title	Notes	Ref(s)
1918	United States Fourth Liberty Loan Drive		
1922	Night Life in Hollywood		
1931	Around the World in 80 Minutes with Douglas Fairbanks	Directed by Douglas Fairbanks and Victor Fleming.	
1932	Running Hollywood		

== Television appearances ==
Year	Title	Role	Notes	Ref(s)
1958	Kraft Television Theatre			
1958	Studio One			
1958	Wagon Train	Sakae Ito		
1959	The Steve Allen Show			
1961-1962	Here's Hollywood			
1963	Route 66	Takasuka		
1965	Taikōki	Takeda Shingen		

== Bibliography ==
- Miyao, Daisuke (2007). Sessue Hayakawa: Silent Cinema and Transnational Stardom. Duke University Press. ISBN 978-0-8223-3969-4. OCLC 470908395.
