= Kay-Bee Pictures =

Silent film company

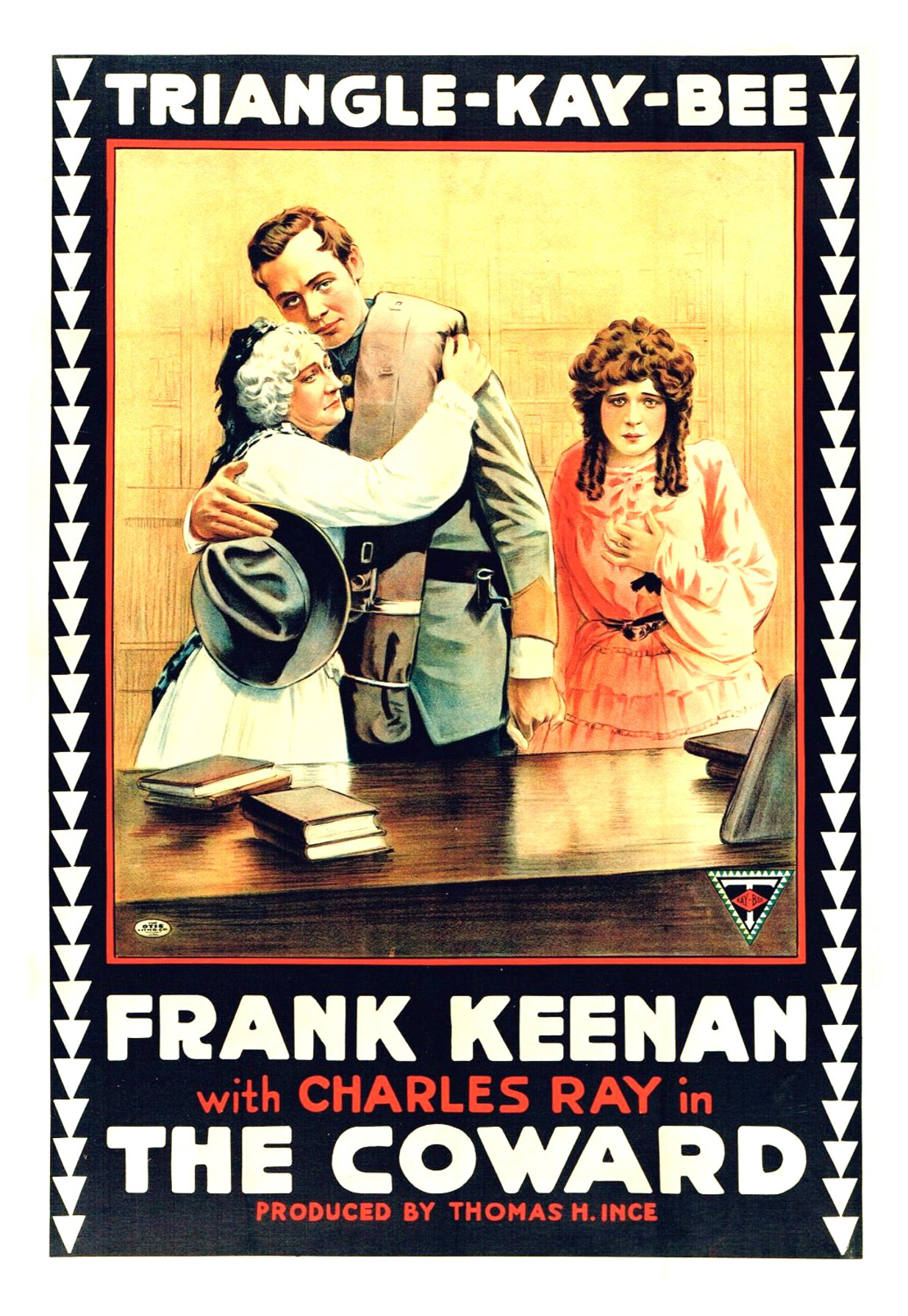
Poster for The Coward

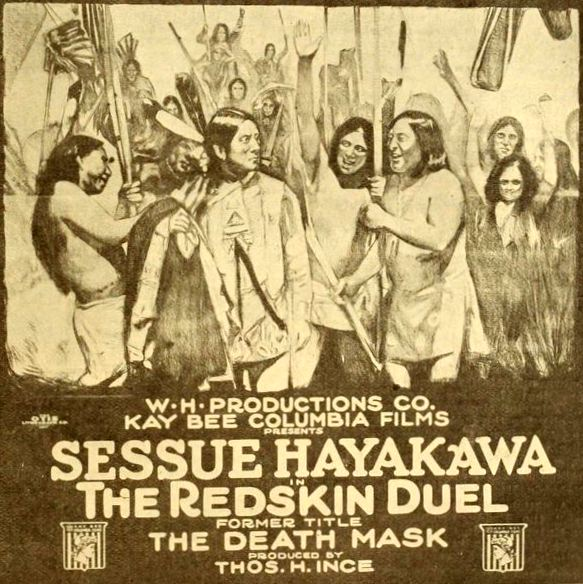
Ad for The Redskin Duel, a re-release of The Death Mask (1914)

Kay-Bee Pictures, or Kessel and Baumann, was an American silent film studio, and part of the New York Motion Picture Company. The company's mottos included, "every picture a headliner" and "Kay-Bee stands for Kessel and Baumann and Kessel and Baumann stands for quality", referring to Adam Kessel and Charles Baumann. It was party of the New York Motion Picture Company and was used after a settlement with rival Universal Pictures to end the film division named 101 Bison. Anna Little was one of its stars. Its executives included Thomas Ince.

== Filmography ==
- The Paymaster's Son (1913)
- The Sergeant's Secret (1913)
- Banzai (1913)
- Love's Sacrifice (1914)
- Mother of the Shadows (1914)
- The Death Mask (1914)
- The Geisha (1914)
- The Gangster and the Girl (1914)
- The Golden Claw (1915)
- The Winged Idol (1915)
- The Coward (1915)
- The Famine (1915)
- The Beckoning Flame (1915)
- The Beggar of Cawpur (1916)
- Shell 43 (1916)
- Civilization's Child (1916)
- Somewhere in France (1916)
- The Raiders (1916)
- Hell's Hinges (1916)
- The Return of Draw Egan (1916)
- The Three Musketeers (1916)
- The Stepping Stone (1916)
- The Wolf Woman (1916)
- The Corner (1916)
- The Apostle of Vengeance (1916)
- The Pitch Hitter (1917)
- The Weaker Sex (1917)
- The Clodhopper (1917)
- The Hater of Men (1917)
- The Bride of Hate (1917)
- The Millionaire Vagrant (1917)
- The Gunfighter (1917)
- Happiness (1917)
