= The Last of the Line =

1914 film

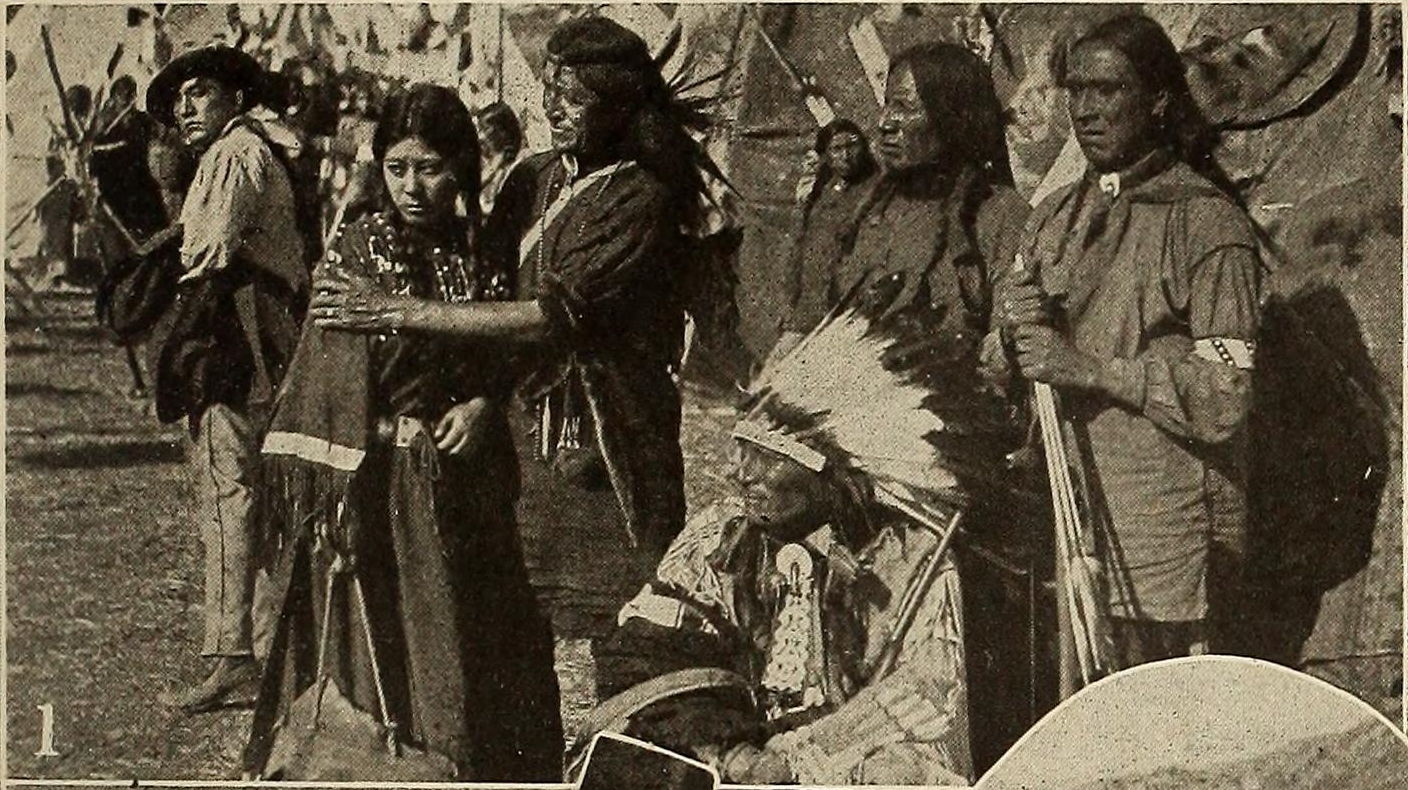
- Joe Goodboy, Tsuru Aoki, and Sessue Hayawaka in a publicity still
- Directed by: Jay Hunt
- Written by: Thomas H. Ince; C. Gardner Sullivan
- Starring: Joe Goodboy; Sessue Hayakawa; Tsuru Aoki; Stanely Bigham; Gladys Brockwell
- Production company: Domino Film Company
- Distributed by: Mutual Film
- Release date: December 24, 1914 (USA)
- Running time: 20 minutes
- Country: United States
- Languages: Silent; English intertitles

The Last of the Line

The Last of the Line is a 1914 American short silent Western film directed by Jay Hunt and featuring Joe Goodboy, Sessue Hayakawa, Tsuru Aoki, Stanley Bigham and Gladys Brockwell in pivotal roles.

== Plot ==
Gray Otter is an Indian chief who had high aspirations for his son Tiah, who was sent away from the tribe and educated on the east coast of the U.S. Tiah returns as a drunken womanizer who harasses a woman bathing and who can barely stand up straight. Gray Otter, meanwhile, makes a pact with the U.S. military that a gold shipment may pass through his territory without injury.

Tiah overhears this and sets up a raiding party to get the gold. Tiah and his gang attack the shipment and kill the men - though one escapes and alerts the U.S. cavalry, who ride toward the battle - before Gray Otter shows up and kills the raiders one by one. Ashamed of his son, Gray Otter props up the son's body against the stagecoach as if the son had died fending off the attack.

Gray Otter brings the soldiers and general to show them the slaughter and to tell them his story of what happened. The general deems Tiah a hero and gives him a military burial. The film ends with Gray Otter dejectedly sitting over his son's grave, despondent that he is now "the last of the line".

== See also ==
- Theme of the Traitor and the Hero- a thematically similar story from Jorge Luis Borges about a traitor who is killed and then branded a hero after his death because it is politically expedient.
