= The Curse of Caste =

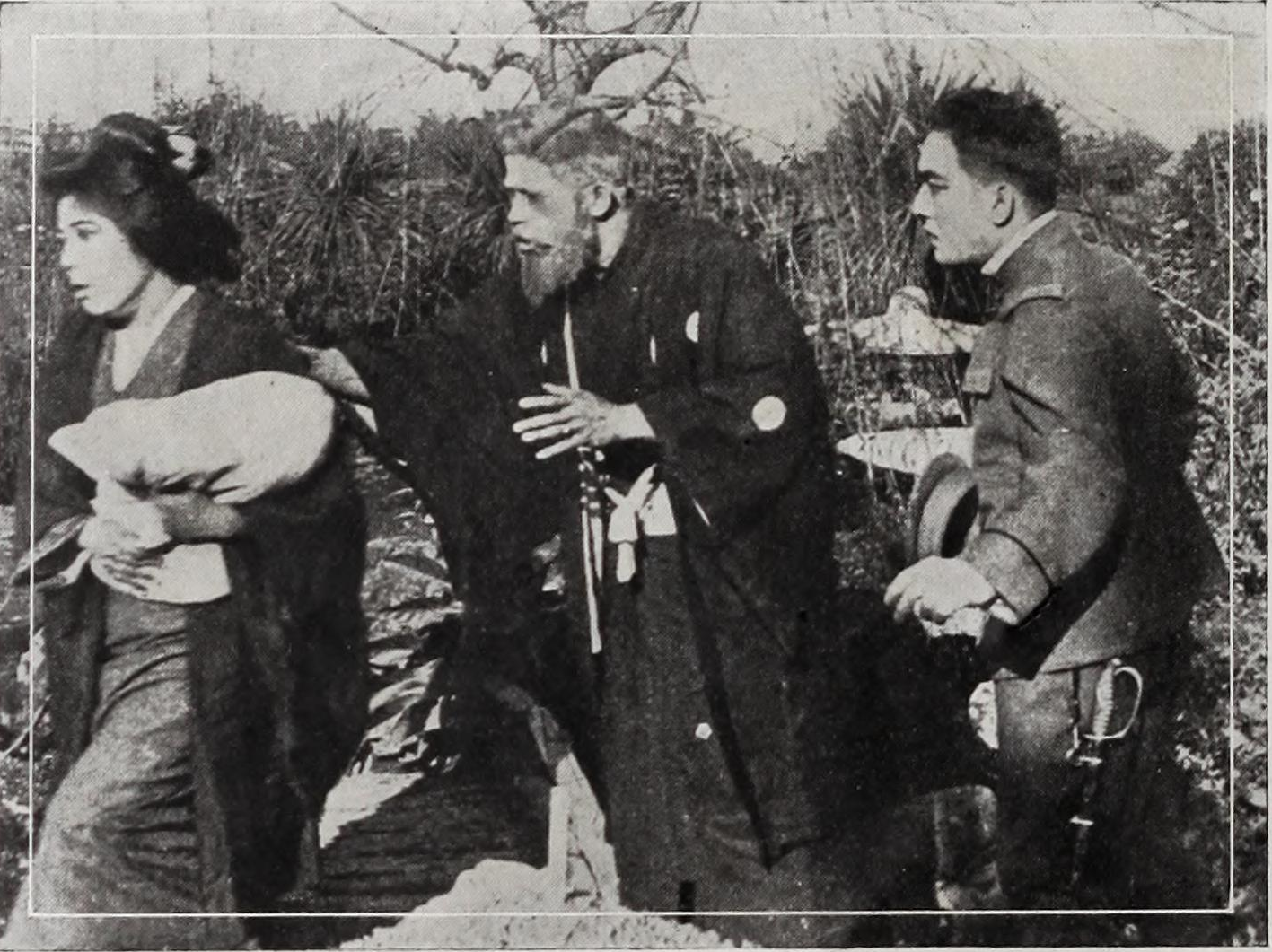
- Tsuru Aoki, Thomas Kurihara, Sessue Hayakawa
- Directed by: Reginald Barker
- Starring: Sessue Hayakawa; Tsuru Aoki; Thomas Kurihara
- Production company: Domino Film Company
- Distributed by: Mutual Film
- Release date: July 30, 1914 (USA)
- Running time: 20 minutes
- Country: USA
- Language: Silent (English intertitles)

The Curse of Caste is a 1914 American silent drama film short directed by Reginald Barker and featuring Sessue Hayakawa, Tsuru Aoki and Thomas Kurihara in important roles. The film was produced by the Domino Film Company and distributed by Mutual Film.

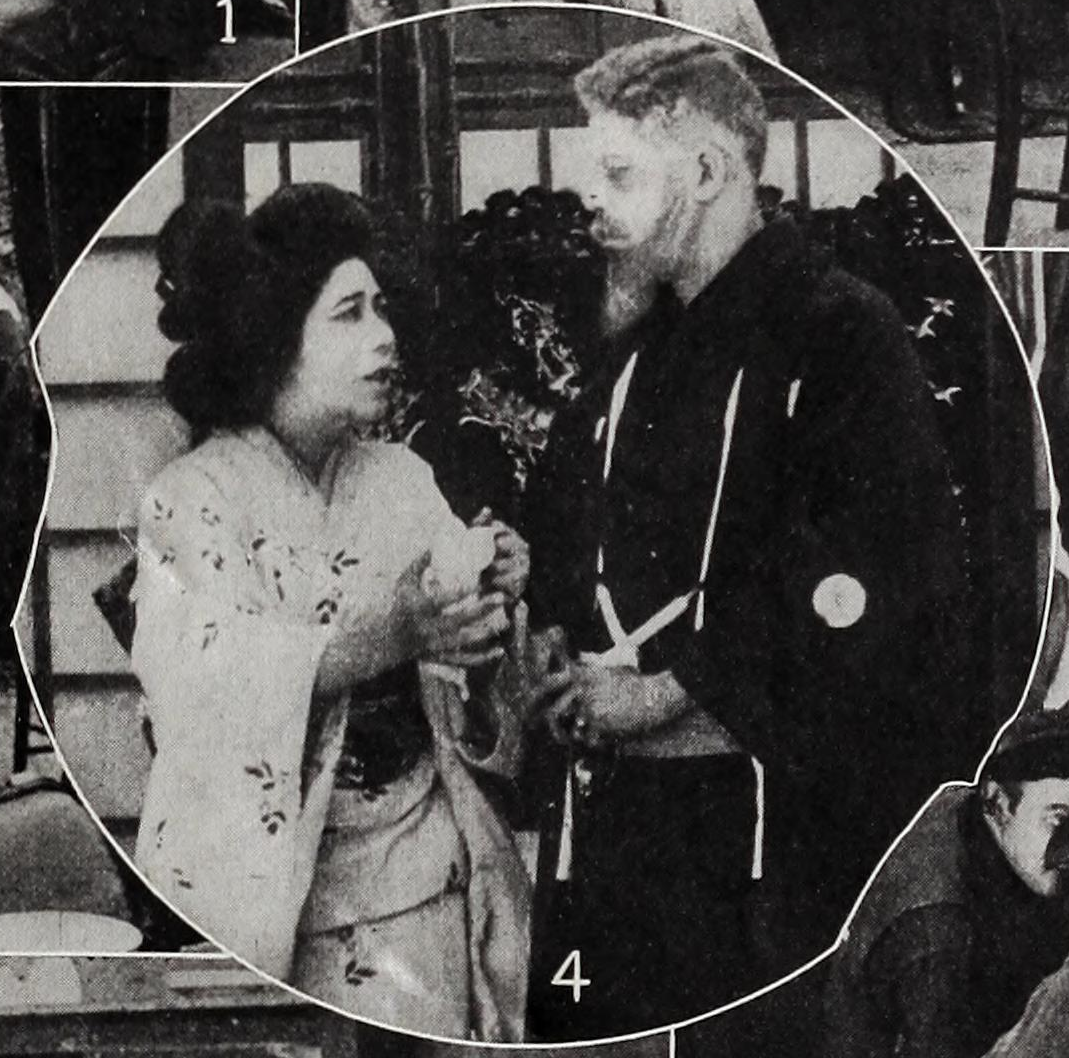
Tsuru Aoki and Thomas Kurihara

== Plot ==
As described in a film magazine, "Kato, a high class Japanese, is desirous of marrying Kissmoia, a low caste Japanese girl of the Etss. The father of Kato, a stern old aristocrat, refuses his consent to the marriage. The girl Kissmoia. realizing that she may cause her lover the displeasure of his father, takes her pack and leaves. Kato, who has seen her leaving, rushes after her and begs her to remain until he interviews his father and tells him of his love for her, and that marriage is his fondest hope. She remains while Kato interviews his father. The old man sternly refuses to consider the alliance, and Kato leaves his father's house and marries the girl of his choice.

A short time later he is living in a Japanese fishing village and while devotedly loving his wife, he also has many sorrowful moments when thinking of his aged father whom he also loves tenderly. Kissomoia sees this sorrow of her husband. Kato receives a communication from his father telling him that the old man's days are numbered and requesting that he return and live with him during the declining days of his life. The letter also specifies that under no circumstances will the proud old father receive his wife into the house. Kato unwittingly drops the letter which is discovered by Kissmoia. She resolves to forever remove herself from the pathway of her husband whom she believes she is dragging down. She leaves, goes to the ocean and there commits suicide by leaping into it. After a bitter all night with himself, the love of Kato for his wife overcomes that for his father and he rushes into her room only to find that she has gone. He sees the note which she left and becomes frantic. A searching party is organized and Kato discovers the body of Kissmoia floating in the surf at nightfall. While the surf washes around him, and with the body of his dead wife clasped in his arms, he stares vacantly out to sea, and the picture dissolves with them in that position."

== Cast ==
- Sessue Hayakawa as Kato Matsumoto
- Tsuru Aoki as Kissmoia
- Thomas Kurihara as General Hirata
