= The Hateful God =

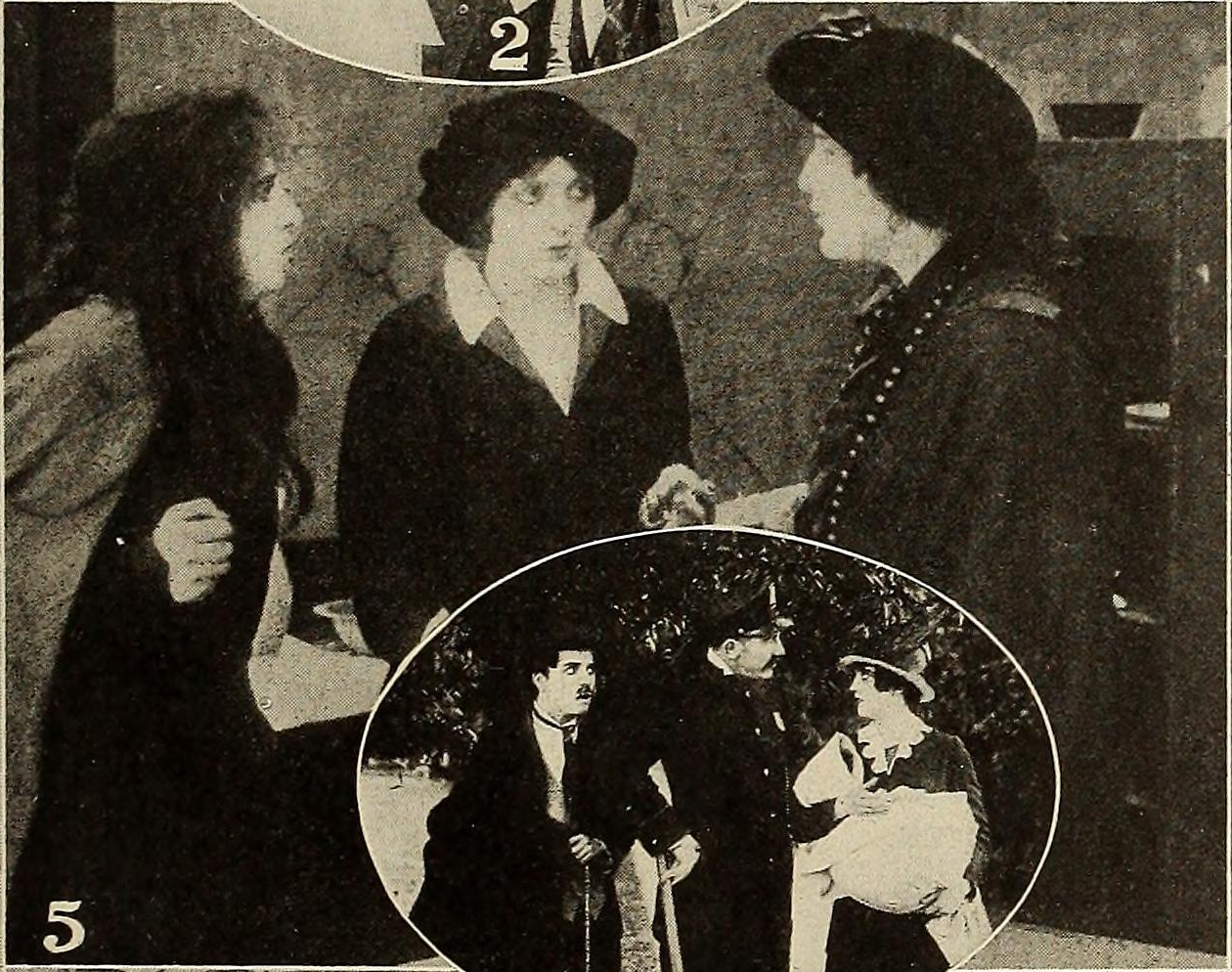
- Enid Markey in a publicity still
- Directed by: Scott Sidney
- Produced by: Thomas H. Ince
- Starring: Enid Markey
- Production company: Kay-Bee Pictures
- Distributed by: Mutual Film
- Release date: November 13, 1914
- Running time: 2 reels
- Country: USA
- Language: Silent (English intertitles)

The Hateful God is a 1914 American silent short drama film directed by Scott Sidney and starring Enid Markey. The film was produced for Kay-Bee Pictures and distributed by Mutual Film.

== Plot ==
According to a film magazine, "Jonathan Storm's idea of God is that of a King of Wrath. He constantly holds before the minds of his two motherless daughters this terrible image, and refuses to allow them the most innocent pleasures as being displeasing to the implacable Ruler of all. Grace, the elder daughter, at last dares to disobey. She takes her little sister Eva to the circus. During the performance a portion of the main tent collapses, and the child is badly hurt. Storm tells Grace that thus has God avenged Himself upon her for her disobedience, and the girl, tried beyond endurance, declares fiercely that she hates God, and will not stay longer under her father's roof. Grace goes to the city where, in her struggle to get along, she is helped by an institutional church of the new Christianity. Bronson Carr, a wealthy man interested in the church, is greatly attracted to Grace and when he learns her story he goes to intercede for her with her father. But it is not until Eva, bursting into tears, flings herself about the neck of the kind stranger and begs him to take her away with him, that Storm relents. Turning over the pages of the Bible his eye falls then on the words, God is Love. He goes to the city and brings Grace home."

== Cast ==
- J. Frank Burke as Jonathan Storm
- Enid Markey as Grace Storm
- Marvel Stafford as Eva Storm
- Harry Keenan as Bronson Carr

== Production ==
For the circus scenes, an enormous tent was constructed near "Inceville" (Santa Monica) in October 1914, where several circus acts were performed for the camera.

== External link ==
- The Hateful God at IMDb
