= Tsuru Aoki =

Japanese actress (1892–1961)

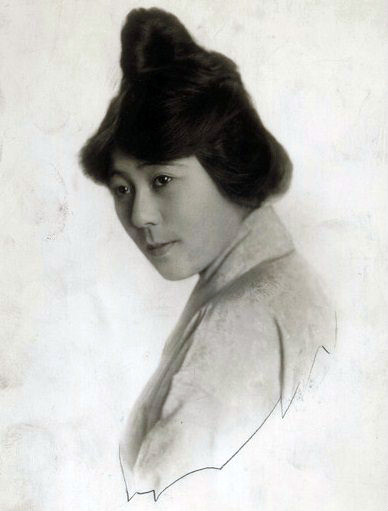
- Portrait in a newspaper, c. 1916
- Born: September 9, 1892; Tokyo, Empire of Japan
- Died: October 18, 1961 (aged 69); Tokyo, Japan
- Occupation: Actress
- Years active: 1913–1924, 1960
- Spouse: Sessue Hayakawa (m. 1914)

Signature
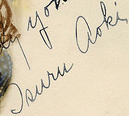

Tsuru Aoki (青木 鶴, Aoki Tsuru; September 9, 1892 – October 18, 1961) was a Japanese stage and screen actress whose career was most prolific in the United States during the silent film era of the 1910s through the 1920s. Aoki may have been the first Asian actress to garner top billing in American motion pictures.

== Life and career ==
Born in Tokyo, Aoki came to California in 1899 with her uncle, Otojirō Kawakami, his geisha wife, Kawakami Sadayakko, and Otojirō's troupe of actors. At their first stop in San Francisco, Tsuru performed with the troupe and assisted Sadayakko at a Palace Hotel tea ceremony where attendees raved over her "diminutive daintiness." But when the troupe ran into severe financial difficulties, Otojirō made arrangements to have Tsuru adopted by Toshio Aoki, a sketch artist for a local newspaper. Tsuru Aoki started taking lessons in ballet dance in New York City, when she went along with her uncle Toshio, who was hired by David Belasco for The Darling of the Gods. After Toshio's death a reporter looked after Aoki. Aoki began her acting career after returning to Los Angeles and performing in stage productions in the city's Japanese Theatre where she was noticed by film producer Thomas Ince who placed the young actress under contract. She was also responsible for recruiting Japanese actors for Imperial Japanese Company, a subsidiary of New York Motion Picture Corporation.

Aoki came to be one of the earliest professional Japanese film actresses within the film industry. She made her film debut in the Majestic Film Company release The Oath of Tsuru San in 1913 opposite actor William Garwood. Her follow-up film was the 1914 Ince production, O Mimi San, which starred the American child actress Mildred Harris and a young Sessue Hayakawa, with whom Aoki had acted onstage at the Japanese Theatre the previous year. The couple began a romantic relationship that culminated in their marriage on May 1, 1914, weeks before the release of their critically acclaimed and publicly successful film The Wrath of the Gods – a melodrama about an interracial romance between a man portrayed by Caucasian actor/ director Frank Borzage and an Asian woman portrayed by Aoki. The film also starred Sessue Hayakawa and featured actress Gladys Brockwell. Hayakawa and Aoki eventually made more than 20 films together throughout the 1910s and 1920s.

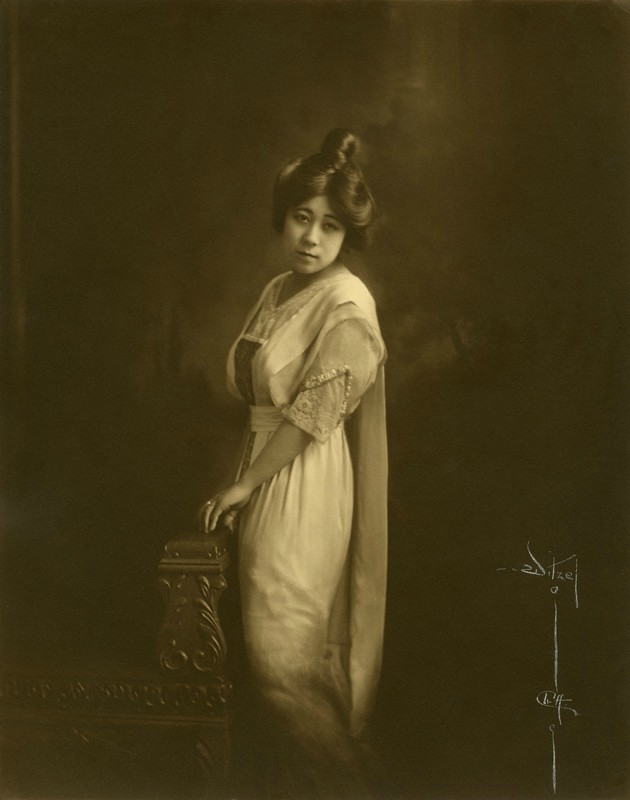
Aoki, c. 1915

A few scenes of Aoki dancing and acting in the 1919 film The Dragon Painter

One of Aoki's most recalled films of the silent period is the 1919 William Worthington-directed The Dragon Painter, based on the novel of the same title by Sidney McCall, in which Aoki starred as a young woman who convinces an isolated, mentally deranged artist named Tatsu (portrayed by Hayakawa) to come down from the mountains so that she may civilize him and he may further his artistic abilities. Other notable films of the period were The Typhoon (1914), The Vigil (1914), The Geisha (1914), The Chinatown Mystery (1915), His Birthright (1918), and The Breath of the Gods (1920).

Throughout the 1910s, Aoki appeared in approximately 40 films, often in leading-lady roles which was a first for an Asian actress. Some of her co-stars of the era included such notable names as Marin Sais, Frank Borzage, Gladys Brockwell, Mildred Harris, Jack Holt, Jane Wolfe, Dagmar Godowsky, Vola Vale, Florence Vidor, Earle Foxe, and Walter Long. After a series of moderately successful Ince-produced two-reel serials, Aoki's career in the United States began to falter (while her husband's career began to build momentum), and the couple travelled to France in 1923 and filmed the popular Édouard-Émile Violet-directed drama La Bataille. After returning to America, however, Aoki made only three more films before retiring from the screen to raise her and Hayakawa's three children. Her last silent screen performance was the 1924 release The Danger Line. Aoki returned to the screen in 1960 (her first sound film) to appear with her husband in the drama Hell to Eternity.

== Death ==
Tsuru Aoki died in Tokyo, Japan, on October 18, 1961, of acute peritonitis at the age of 69.

== Filmography ==
Title	Year	Role	Notes	Ref
The Oath of Tsuru San	1913	Tsuru San	Short; Lost film	
O Mimi San	1914	O Mimi San		
The Courtship of O San	1914	O San	Short; Lost film	
The Geisha	1914	Myo	Short; Lost film	
Love's Sacrifice	1914	Little Faun	Lost film	
The Wrath of the Gods	1914	Toya San		
A Tragedy of the Orient	1914	Kissmoia	Short; Lost film	
A Relic of Old Japan	1914	Katuma	Short; Lost film	
Desert Thieves	1914	Owanono	Short; Lost film	
Star of the North	1914	Star of the North	Short; Lost film	
The Curse of Caste	1914	Kissmoia	Short; Lost film	
The Village 'Neath the Sea	1914	Little Fawn	Short; Lost film	
The Death Mask	1914	Princess Nona	Short	
The Typhoon	1914	N/A		
Nipped	1914	San Toy Nakado	Short; Lost film	
The Vigil	1914	Mira	Short; Lost film	
Mother of the Shadows	1914	Laughing Moon	Short; Lost film	
The Last of the Line	1914	Girl at Riverside	Short	
The Famine	1915	Misao	Short; Lost film	
The Chinatown Mystery	1915	Woo	Short; Lost film	
The Beckoning Flame	1915	Janira	Short; Lost film	
Alien Souls	1916	Yuri Chan	Lost film	
The Honorable Friend	1916	Toki-Ye	Lost film	
The Soul of Kura San	1916	Kura-San	Lost film	
Each to His Kind	1917	Princess Nada	Lost film	
The Call of the East	1917	O'Mitsu – Arai's Sister	Lost film	
The Curse of Iku	1918	Omi San	Lost film	
The Bravest Way	1918	Sat-u		
His Birthright	1918	Saki San	Incomplete film	
A Heart in Pawn	1919	Sada	Lost film	
The Courageous Coward	1919	Rei Oaki	Lost film	
The Gray Horizon	1919	O Haru San	Lost film	
The Dragon Painter	1919	Ume-Ko		
Bonds of Honor	1919	Toku-ko	Lost film	
Locked Lips	1920	Lotus Blossom	Lost film	
A Tokyo Siren	1920	Asuti Hishuri	Lost film	
The Breath of the Gods	1920	Yuki Onda	Lost film	
Screen Snapshots	1920–1921	Herself		
Black Roses	1921	Blossom	Lost film	
Five Days to Live	1922	Ko Ai	Lost film	
Night Life in Hollywood	1922	Herself	Incomplete film	
The Battle	1923	La Marquise Yorisaka	Lost film	
The Danger Line	1924	Marquise Yorisaka	Lost film	
The Great Prince Shan	1924	Nita	Lost film	
Sen Yan's Devotion	1924	Sen Yan's Wife	Lost film	
Hell to Eternity	1960	Mother Une		
Decasia	2002	Geisha	Archive footage	

== Bibliography ==
- The Americanization of Tsuru Aoki: Orientalism, Melodrama, Star Image, and the New Woman by Sara Ross. Duke University Press, 2005. Camera Obscura 20 (3 60):129-157; doi:10.1215/02705346-20-3_60-129.
- Ross, Sara (2005). "The Americanization of Tsuru Aoki: Orientalism, Melodrama, Star Image, and the New Woman". In Catherine Russell (ed.). Camera Obscura 60: New Women of the Silent Screen: China, Japan, Hollywood. Durham, N.C.: Duke University Press. pp. 128–157. ISBN 978-0-8223-6624-9.
