= The Famine (film) =

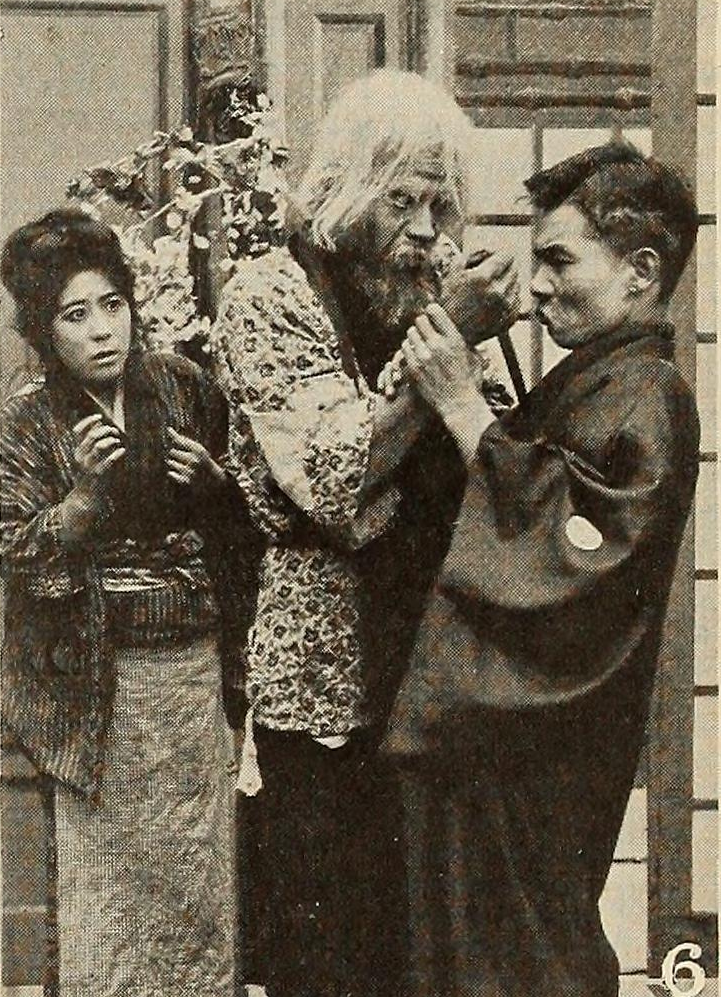
- Directed by: George Osborne
- Written by: Richard V. Spencer
- Starring: Sessue Hayakawa; Tsuru Aoki
- Production company: Kay-Bee Pictures
- Distributed by: Mutual Film
- Release date: January 29, 1915 (USA)
- Running time: 10 min.
- Country: USA
- Language: English

The Famine is a 1915 American silent short drama film directed by George Osborne and featuring Sessue Hayakawa and Tsuru Aoki.

== Plot ==
According to a film magazine, "At the time of the famine, Misao shares her last bit of bread with a beggar, Horisho. He never forgets, and later, when he finds Misao on the point of marrying Toyomo against her will, to save her father from poverty, the beggar determines to help her wed Yoshiro, whom she loves. Going to the home of Toyomo, Horisho pleads for a hearing. But the haughty Japanese, who is much above Misao in station, kicks him out of the house. That night Horisho overhears him telling Misao, that he has no intention of marrying her but wants her for his mistress. The beggar slips from his hiding place and kills Toyomo. He then helps Misao to escape to her lover. Meanwhile, the body of Toyomo has been discovered. Horisho is hunted down and killed — but he lives long enough to see Misao and Yoshiro safely out at sea in his boat."
