= A Tragedy of the Orient =

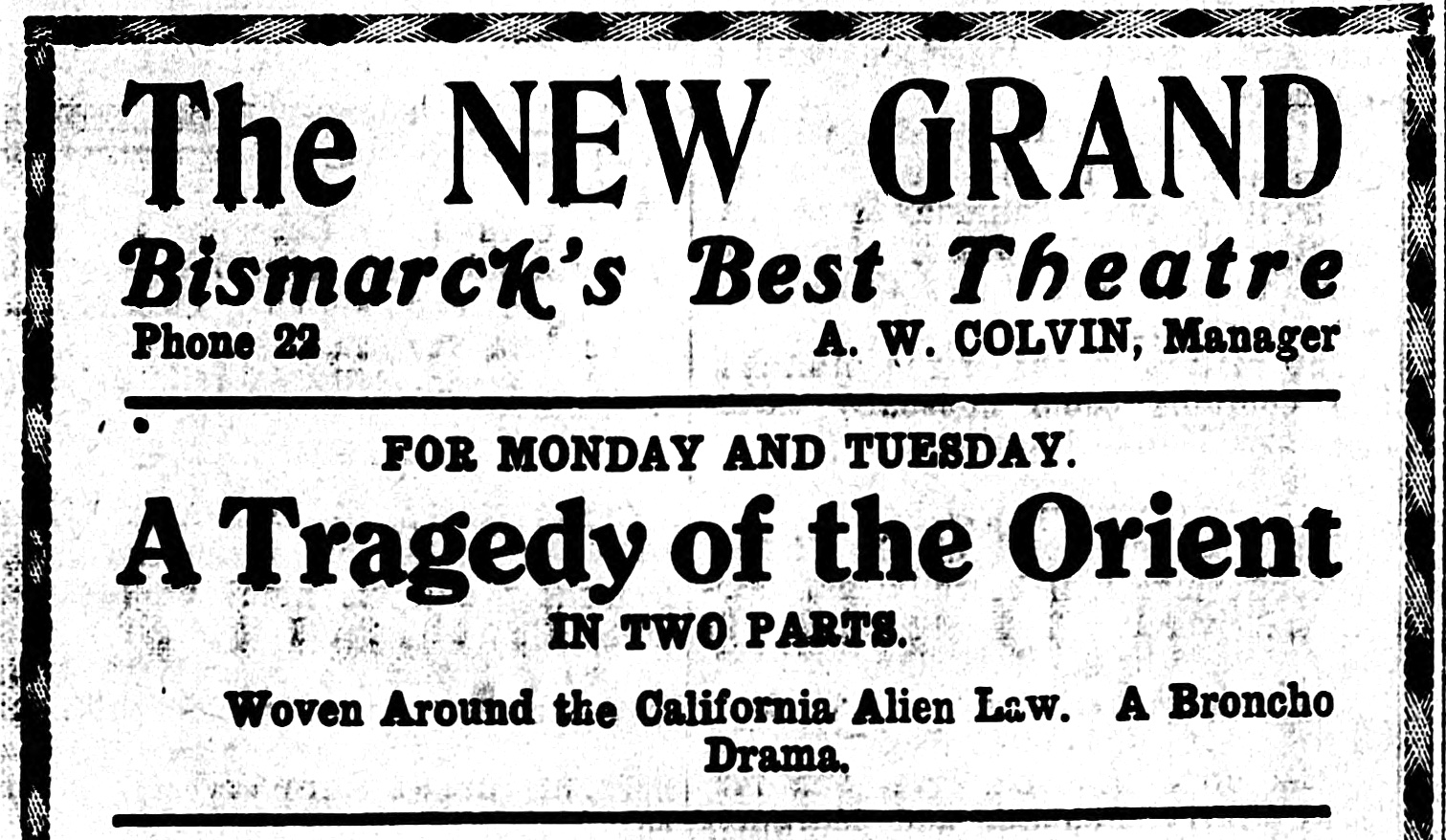
- Contemporary advertisement
- Directed by: Reginald Barker
- Starring: Sessue Hayakawa; Tsuru Aoki
- Production company: Broncho Film Company
- Distributed by: Mutual Film
- Release date: June 10, 1914 (USA)
- Running time: 20 minutes
- Country: USA
- Language: Silent (English intertitles)

A Tragedy of the Orient is a 1914 American silent short drama film directed by Reginald Barker and featuring Sessue Hayakawa, Tsuru Aoki, Frank Borzage and George Osborne in important roles. The film was produced by the Broncho Film Company and distributed by Mutual Film.

== Plot ==
As described in a film magazine, "In order to keep his son from marrying Kissmoia, the supposed daughter of General Hirata, Osako Matsumoto compels the general to tell Kissmoia that she is of lowly birth and is only his daughter by adoption. Kissmoia is so broken-hearted that she joins the Ceizha girls. Kato, Osako's son, plans with the marriage broker to release Kissmoia from the Ceizha house as his (Kato's) mistress. Kato is about to remove Kissmoia by force from the Ceizha House, when Tom Arnold, the newly appointed agent of the Japanese-American Steamship Company, rescues her.

He later marries her, having an American minister perform the ceremony. Kato and the marriage broker attempt to take the girl away from Arnold, but they are informed that now the girl is an American citizen and as such shall have the protection of the American consul. This so enrages Kato that he vows vengeance. Later when a notice is posted in front of the newspaper office to the effect that California has passed the Japanese alien law, Kato incites the populace to attack the first American they see, which happens to be Arnold. Kissmoia knows that it is Kato who has caused her husband's death. She sends him a note, telling him that she had made a mistake when she married the American and now that he is dead she will go to him. As he is about to embrace her she stabs him."

== Cast ==
- Tsuru Aoki as Kissmoia
- Sessue Hayakawa as Kato
- Frank Borzage as Tom Arnold
- George Osborne as Captain Williams

== Reception ==
The Motion Picture News gave the film a positive review, praising the scenery and the "capable Japanese cast."
