= Locked Lips =

1920 film by William C. Dowlan

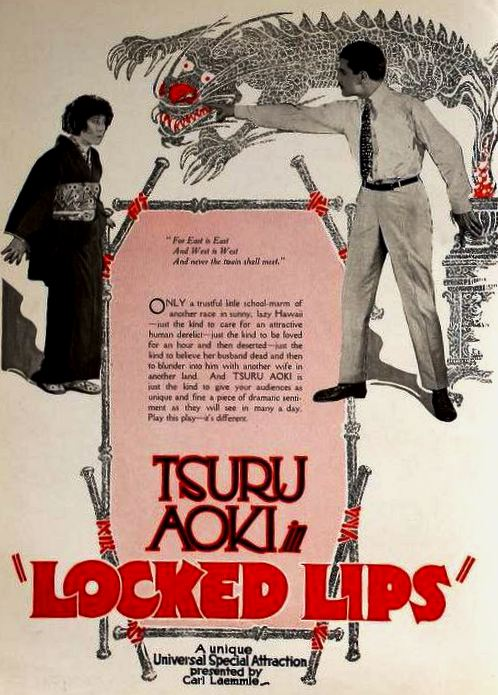
- Advertisement for the film
- Directed by: William C. Dowlan
- Written by: Violet Clark (scenario)
- Based on: "Blossom" by Clifford Howard
- Starring: Tsuru Aoki; Stanhope Wheatcroft
- Production company: Universal Film Manufacturing Company
- Release date: April 28, 1920 (USA)
- Running time: 5 reels
- Country: United States
- Language: Silent (English intertitles)

Locked Lips is a 1920 American drama film directed by William C. Dowlan and featuring Tsuru Aoki, Stanhope Wheatcroft, and Magda Lane.

== Plot ==
As described in a film magazine, Blossom, a Japanese orphan girl and a teacher at a native school in Hawaii, finds Parker, an American and a derelict, attempting to rob her cottage. She sympathizes with him and partially reclaims him, and then they are married. Park fleas to Honolulu and then to the United States, leaving behind indications that he drowned. Blossom comes to the United States and gets a position as a lady's maid to Audry. On the day that a baby is born to Audry, her husband Harvey Stanwood returns home, and Blossom recognizes in him her former husband Park. He, aware of Blossom's identity and fearing exposure, attempts to kill her with poison incense, but he falls victim to it instead. Blossom returns to her Japanese lover Komo and they find happiness.

== Cast ==
- Tsuru Aoki as Lotus Blossom
- Stanhope Wheatcroft as Park, aka Harvey Stanwood
- Magda Lane as Audrey Stanwood
- Yutaka Abe as Komo (as Jack Abbe)

== Preservation ==
With no prints of Locked Lips located in any film archives, it is considered a lost film.
