= A Relic of Old Japan =

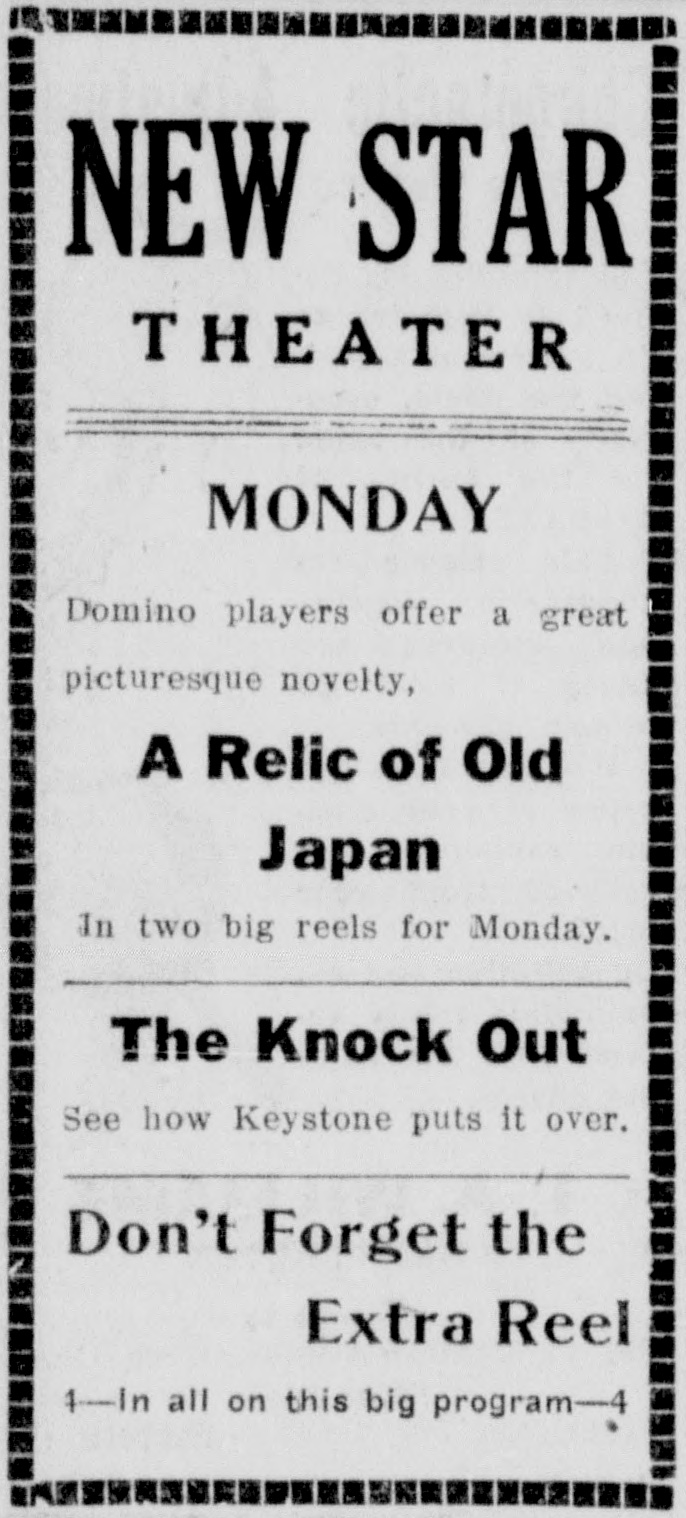
- Newspaper advertisement
- Directed by: Reginald Barker; Thomas H. Ince
- Written by: J.G. Hawks
- Starring: Sessue Hayakawa; Tsuru Aoki
- Production company: Domino Film Company
- Distributed by: Mutual Film
- Release date: June 11, 1914 (USA)
- Running time: 2 reels
- Country: USA
- Language: Silent (English intertitles)

A Relic of Old Japan is a 1914 American silent short drama film directed by Reginald Barker and Thomas H. Ince. Sessue Hayakawa, Tsuru Aoki, Frank Borzage and Henry Kotani played important roles in the film. The film was produced by the Domino Film Company and distributed by Mutual Film.

== Plot ==
As described in a film magazine, "Baron Yoshoto, an old Samurai of Japan, is loath to have his son, Koto, go to the states to finish his education, but is finally persuaded. Koto bids his sweetheart goodbye and vows to his father that he will not be influenced by American customs, but will return a Samurai.

A year later at a college club, Koto meets Jim Wendell, a crook and schemer. Wendell introduces Koto to a chorus girl, Annette Walsh, who ensnares him into a marriage. When Baron Yoshoto hears of Koto's marriage he disinherits him, and Annette, who has only married Koto for his money, deserts him and goes with Jim Wendell. Koto trails them and strangles Annette. He then goes to the police and gives himself up, writing a note of farewell to his father and sweetheart in old Japan."

== Cast ==
- Sessue Hayakawa as Koto
- Tsuru Aoki as Katuma
- Gladys Brockwell as Annette Walsh
- Frank Borzage as Jim Wendell
- Mr. Yoshida as Baron Yoshoto

== Censorship ==
Before A Relic of Old Japan could be released in Chicago, the Chicago Board of Censors required the removal of an intertitle saying "Try and land Koto and we will divide up," the scene where Koto strangles Annette, and the closeup of her body.
