= Nipped (film) =

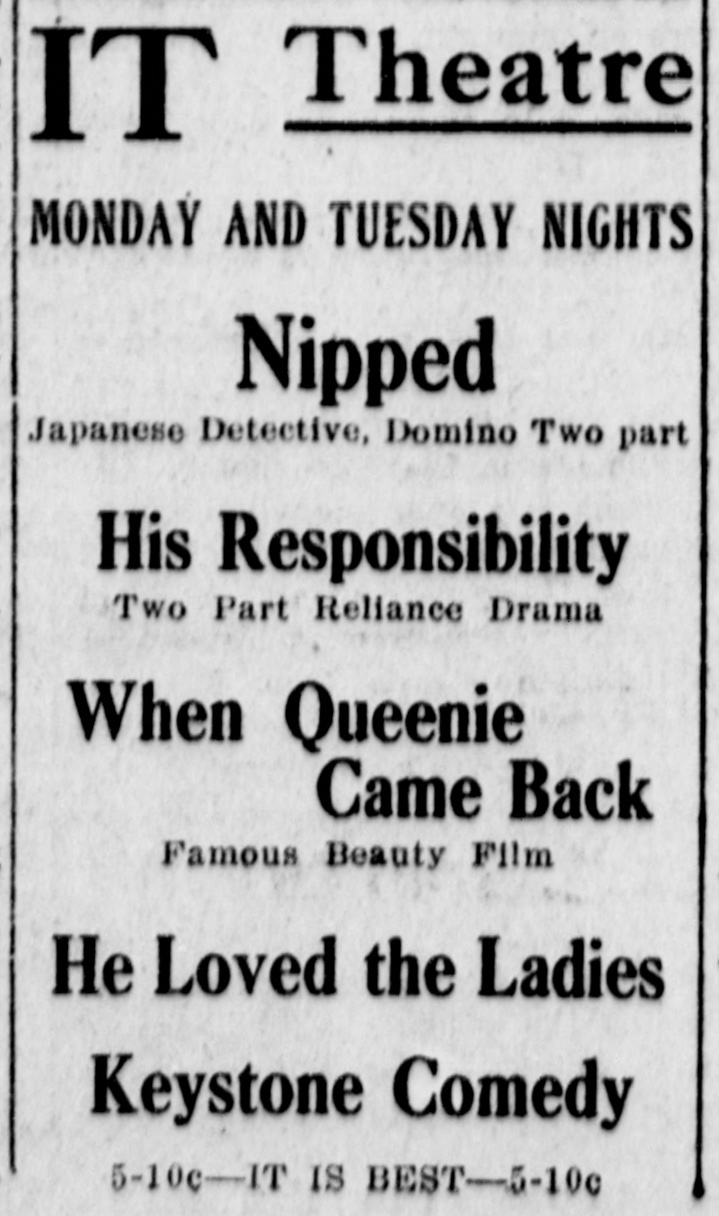
- Contemporary Advertisement
- Directed by: George Osborne
- Produced by: Thomas H. Ince
- Starring: Sessue Hayakawa; Tsuru Aoki; Mr. Yoshida; Frank Borzage
- Production company: Domino Film Company
- Distributed by: Mutual Film
- Release date: November 19, 1914 (USA)
- Running time: 20 minutes
- Country: USA
- Language: Silent (English intertitles)

Nipped is a 1914 American short silent drama film directed by George Osborne and featuring Sessue Hayakawa, Tsuru Aoki, Mr. Yoshida and Frank Borzage in pivotal roles.

== Plot ==
According to a film magazine, "Nasso Nakado a Japanese of high birth, is living on Magdalena Bay, Mexico, disguised as a fisherman. Taro Kamura, another distinguished subject of the Mikado, is sent as special envoy to arrange with General Gomez for land concessions. He and Nakado work together on the proposition and succeed in securing the promise of the land in return for arms and ammunition. In the meantime, San Toy, Nakado's beautiful daughter, secretly has been posing for an American artist, Tom Wright, with whom she has fallen in love. He learns through her the secrets of the Japanese. Taro Kamura meets San Toy and wishes to marry her. She rejects him, however, and one day he follows her to the American's tent. Wright sees the Mikado's envoys at night unloading a ship filled with ammunition and rifles, which they store in the Japanese Christian mission. He enlists the help of Bill Davis, another American, and with the cooperation of some miners they blow up the mission. Kamura tells Nakado and the Mexican general to look for the spy in Wright's tent. Meanwhile the young American has made his escape. But San Toy, returning to warn him, is shot and killed by Gomez who mistakes her for Wright. Kamura displays to Nakado the artist's painting of San Toy and says, 'It is just. Your daughter was a traitor to her country.'"

== Production ==
For the destruction of the mission, 20 tons of dynamite were used to create the explosion. Eight cameras were placed a distance away to fully capture the destruction.
