= The Chinatown Mystery =

- Directed by: Reginald Barker
- Written by: Monte M. Katterjohn
- Starring: Howard C. Hickman; Leona Hutton; Sessue Hayakawa; Tsuru Aoki; Walter Belasco; Louis Morrison
- Production company: Broncho Film Company
- Distributed by: Mutual Film
- Release date: February 10, 1915 (USA)
- Running time: 20 min.
- Language: English

The Chinatown Mystery is a 1915 American short silent mystery film directed by Reginald Barker and featuring Howard C. Hickman, Leona Hutton, Sessue Hayakawa and Tsuru Aoki in important roles.

== Plot ==
According to a film magazine, "Frank Sloan, reporter on a big city paper, is detailed to work in Chinatown upon the mysterious disappearance of a Chinese slave-girl. Woo. His nerves becomes unstrung and he falls into the opium habit. Some time later he obtains some inside information on a murder mystery, and promises Captain Wells that he will put him in a position to arrest the murderer if he will keep the fact a secret for just one hour — time enough for Sloan to get a scoop on it for his old paper. After the story is landed some of Sloan's friends shanghai him aboard a steamer bound on a long cruise, and he finally overcomes his cravings for opium. On his return he receives his old position again, and becomes reconciled to his fiancee."

== Cast ==
- Howard C. Hickman as Frank Sloan
- Leona Hutton as Grace Adams
- Sessue Hayakawa as Yo Hong
- Tsuru Aoki as Woo
- Walter Belasco as Hop Lee
- Louis Morrison as Captain Wells

== Production ==
Parts of The Chinatown Mystery were shot on location in San Francisco.
