= The Vigil (1914 film) =

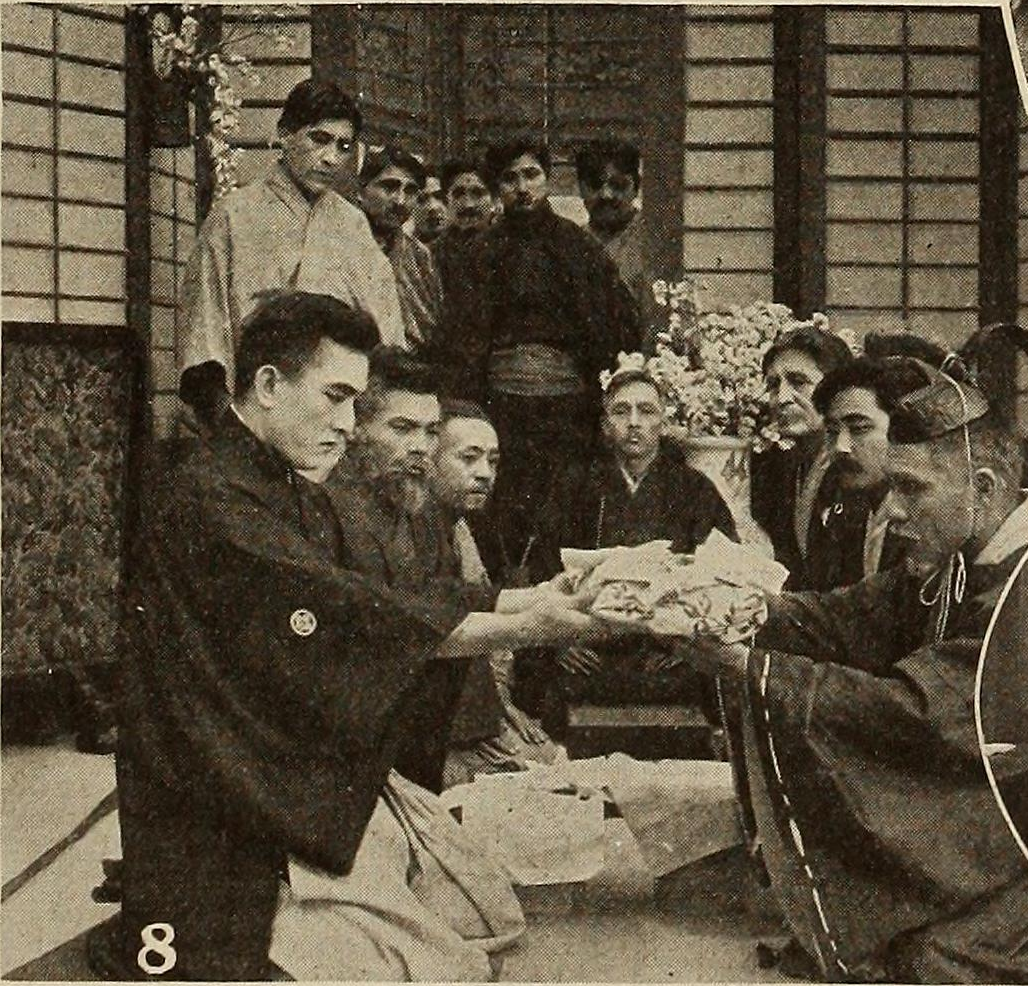
- Sessue Hayakawa in a publicity still
- Directed by: George Osborne
- Story by: Thomas H. Ince; Richard V. Spencer
- Starring: Tsuru Aoki; Sessue Hayakawa; Thomas Kurihara; Mr. Yamato
- Production company: Domino Film Company
- Distributed by: Mutual Film
- Release date: December 3, 1914 (USA)
- Running time: 20 min.
- Country: USA
- Language: Silent (English intertitles)

The Vigil is a 1914 American short silent drama film directed by George Osborne and featuring Tsuru Aoki, Sessue Hayakawa, Thomas Kurihara and Mr. Yamato in prominent roles.

== Plot ==
According to a film magazine, "Kamura, a Japanese fisherman, has arranged a betrothal between his daughter, Mira, and Owaru, whom she does not love. The son of a wealthy Japanese merchant is shipwrecked, and Mira rescues him. She and Kenjiro fall in love, and her engagement with Owaru is cancelled. According to native custom, Kenjiro is appointed "one year god-master", an honor which requires him to live the life of a hermit for twelve months. If, during this time, any calamity comes upon the community it is believed to have been caused by the godmaster's negligence of some religious duty. A ship from Asia Minor brings the plague to the town, and Owaru, jealous of his rival, fans the popular superstition and turns the village against the god-master. Choosing an occasion when Kenjiro is to keep an all night vigil, Owaru drugs his food, and the people find him asleep at his post. He is cast in prison and sentenced to be flogged to death. Mira is suspicious of the part Owaru has played in this. She disguises herself as one of his ancestors and appears to him, hoping to terrify him into confession. He escapes from his hut but falls over a precipice, Mira pursuing. Dying, he owns to her that he drugged Kenjiro."

== Cast ==
- Sessue Hayakawa as Kenjiro
- Tsuru Aoki as Mira
- Thomas Kurihara as Owaru
- Mr. Yamato as Kamura
