= The Village 'Neath the Sea =

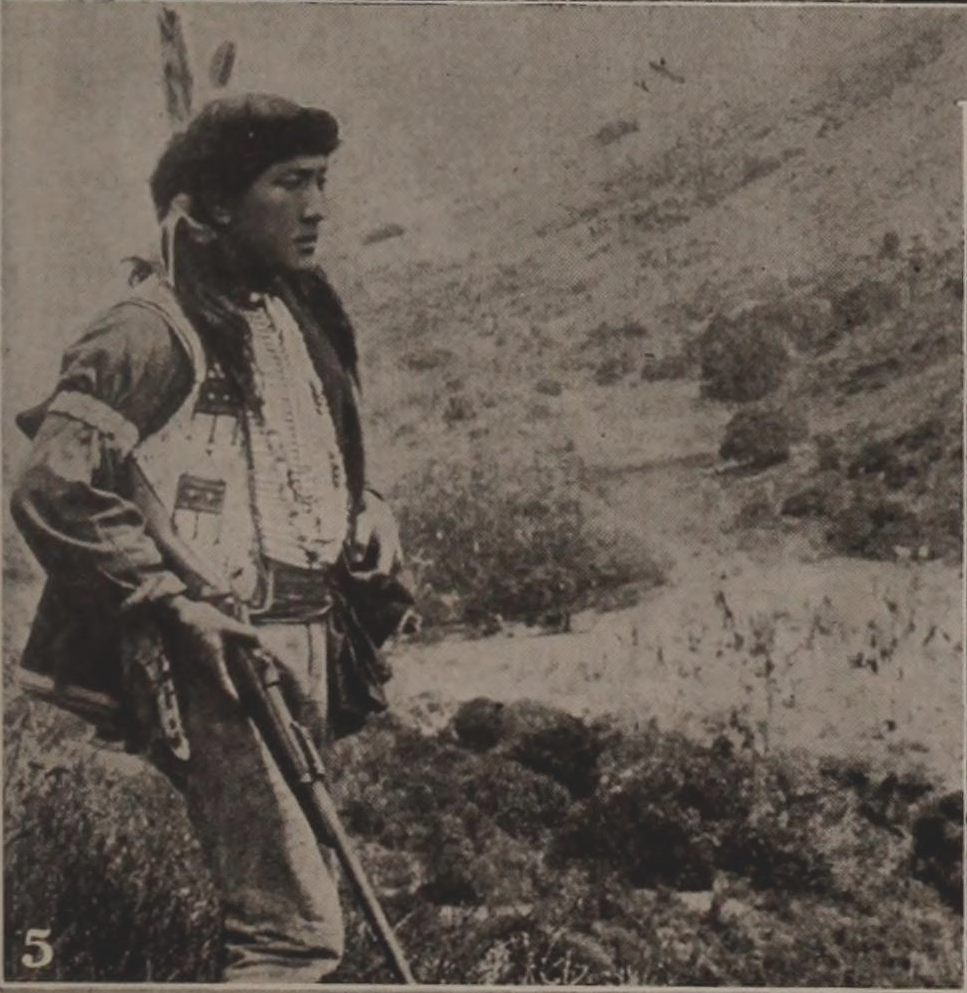
- Sessue Hayakawa
- Directed by: Thomas H. Ince; Jay Hunt
- Produced by: Thomas H. Ince
- Starring: Tsuru Aoki; Sessue Hayakawa
- Production company: Domino Film Company
- Distributed by: Mutual Film
- Release date: August 27, 1914 (USA)
- Running time: 20 mins.
- Country: USA
- Language: Silent (English intertitles)

The Village 'Neath the Sea is a 1914 American silent short adventure film directed by Thomas H. Ince and Jay Hunt. Sessue Hayakawa, Tsuru Aoki, Lone Bear and Ernest Swallow played important roles in it.

== Plot ==
According to a film magazine, "Red Elk, a young Indian brave, marries Little Fawn of the Sioux, and takes her home with him to his village on the California coast. Big Bear, fired with jealousy, tells Red Elk that he will not keep his bride many moons, and one night while they are sleeping. Big Bear enters the tepee and carries Little Fawn away. Red Elk pursues them all night, overtaking them at last by the sea. A glimpse of the Indian girl's face tells him that she is dead. The young brave returns to his people, half crazed. An aged woman of the tribe relates to him an old, old legend of the village under the ocean where Little Fawn awaits his coming. At midnight Red Elk throws himself into the sea."

== Cast ==
- Tsuru Aoki as Little Fawn
- Sessue Hayakawa as Red Elk
- Ernest Swallow as Big Bear
- White Star as Chief
- Lone Bear as Old crone

== Production ==
Exteriors for The Village 'Neath the Sea were shot at Santa Monica Canyon.
