= The Oath of Tsuru San =

1913 film

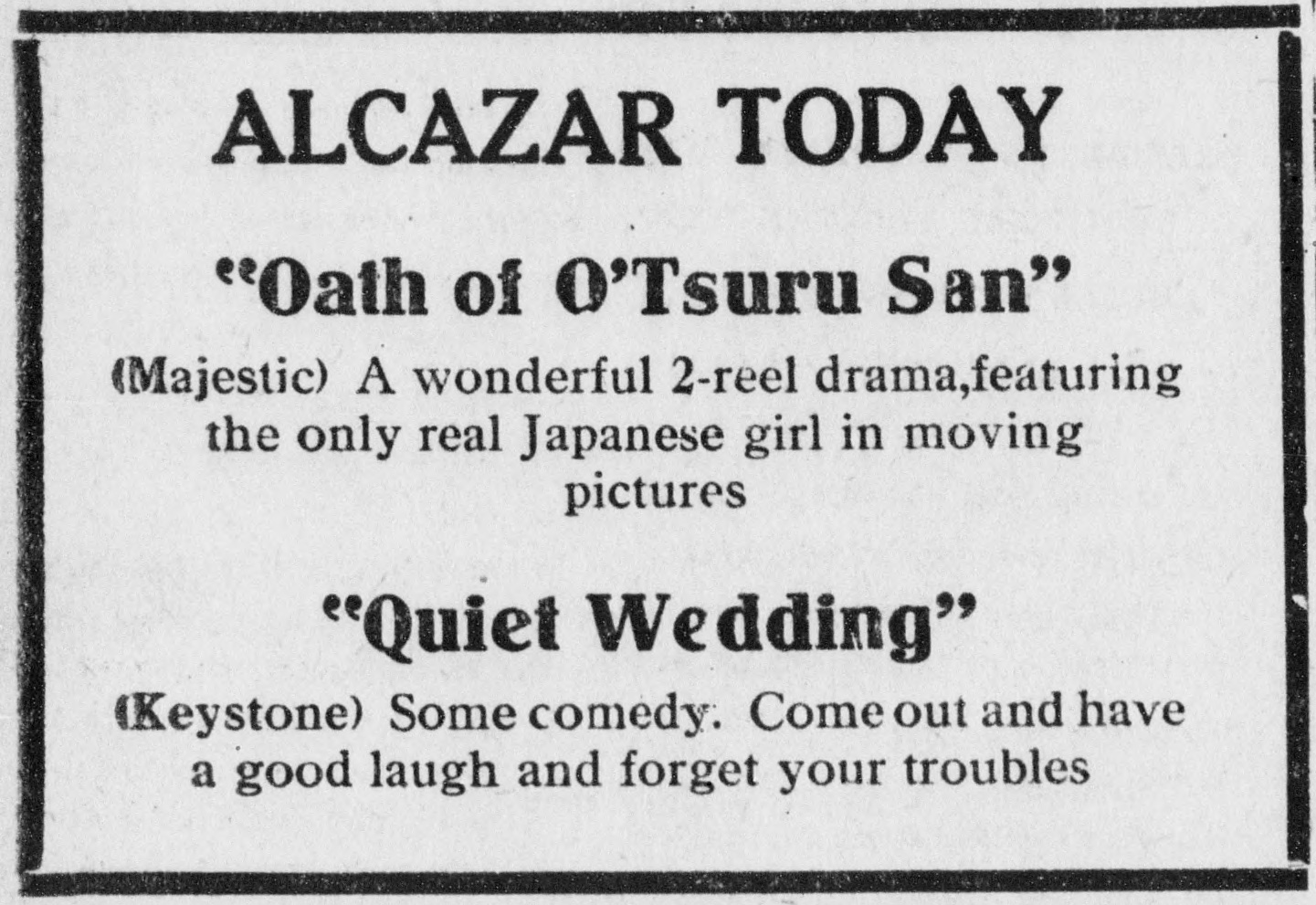
- Contemporary newspaper advertisement for the film
- Starring: William Garwood; Tsuru Aoki
- Distributed by: Mutual Film
- Release date: October 28, 1913
- Running time: 2 reels
- Country: United States
- Languages: Silent film English intertitles

The Oath of Tsuru San is an American silent short drama film starring William Garwood and Tsuru Aoki. It was released in October 1913.

== Cast ==
- Tsuru Aoki as O'Tsuru San
- William Garwood as Ned Winthrop
- William Nigh as Yokosawa

== Production ==
The Oath of Tsuru San was filmed at the Majestic Studios in Los Angeles, with Tsuru Aoki supervising the set construction. The costumes were imported from Japan.
