= The Courtship of O San =

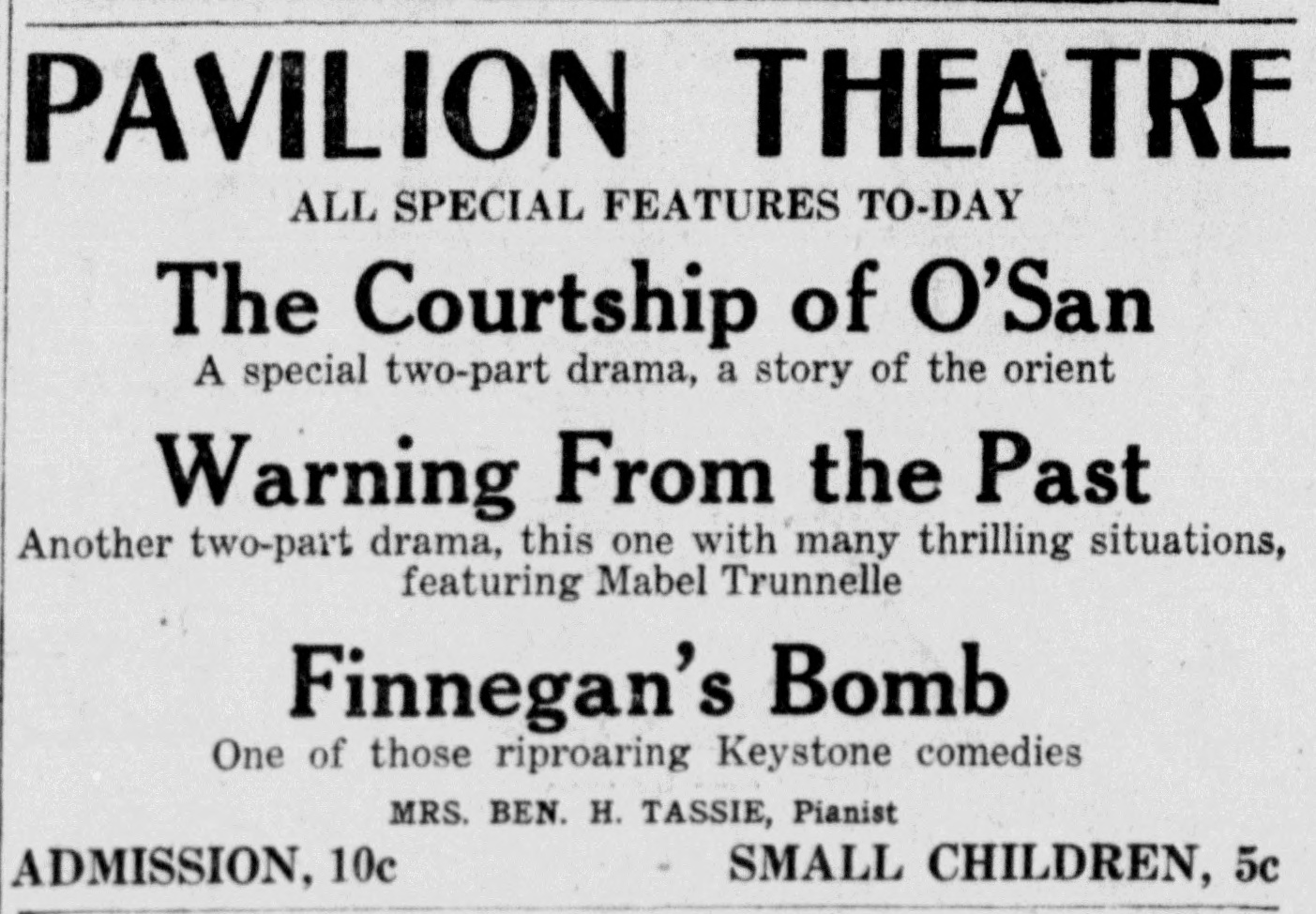
- Contemporary newspaper advertisement for the film.
- Directed by: Charles Miller
- Written by: Richard V. Spencer
- Starring: Sessue Hayakawa; Tsuru Aoki; Thomas Kurihara
- Production company: Domino Film Company
- Distributed by: Mutual Film
- Release date: February 26, 1914 (USA)
- Running time: 20 mins.
- Country: USA
- Language: English

The Courtship of O San is a 1914 American silent drama short film directed by Charles Miller and featuring Sessue Hayakawa, Tsuru Aoki and Mr. Yoshida in the lead roles. The film was produced by the Domino Film Company and was distributed by Mutual Film.

== Plot ==
As described by a film magazine, "The story tells of Shotoku, the son of a Marquis, who meets and becomes enamored of O San, a well-known actress. Under the guise of being a tradesman he wins her affections and asks her to be his wife. She consents and the wedding is arranged. The Marquis has not been informed of his son's coming nuptials, and orders that he shall marry Yama, the daughter of the Baron Kamuri. The boy protests, yet cannot tell the truth for the Japanese father, like the ancient Romans, has the power of life and death over his children.

The wedding with the girl of noble birth is all arranged. Shotoku takes tearful leave of O San, telling her that he must go to America, yet hating to deceive the girl he loves. He also discloses his identity. O San reads of the coming wedding, and knows that her lover has lied to her. She arranges to become one of the entertainers at the ceremony.

On the day of the wedding O San, posing purely as an entertainer, stabs Shotoku mortally, then runs away. After hiding from the authorities she is captured and brought back. The boy asks that they be left alone for a little while before his death, to which the police agree. He then asks her pardon for what he had done and dies in her arms. She, following the traditions of her people, commits suicide beside the body of the man she loved."

== Cast ==
- Sessue Hayakawa as Shotoku
- Tsuru Aoki as O San
- Mr. Yoshida as Osaka - The Marquis
- Thomas Kurihara as Baron (as Kisaburô Kurihara)
- Ms. Matsumoto as Yama

== Reception ==
Variety's review was positive, praising the atmosphere and the "natural" acting style of the Japanese performers.
