= The Death Mask =

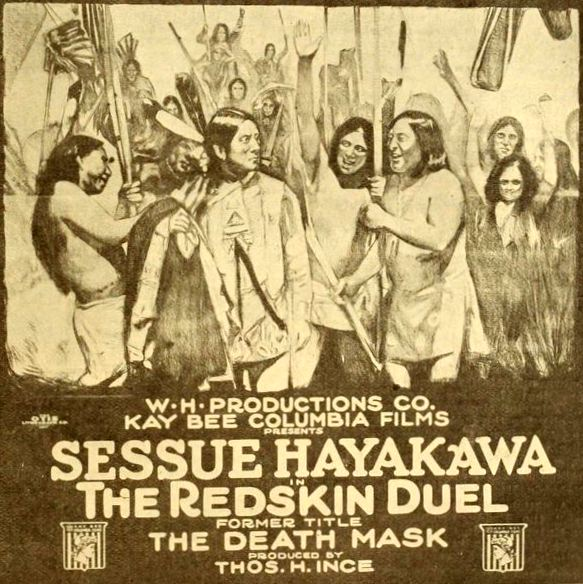
- Directed by: Thomas H. Ince
- Produced by: Thomas H. Ince
- Starring: Sessue Hayakawa; One Feather; Ernest Swallow; Crazy Thunder; Pete Red Elk; Tsuru Aoki
- Production company: Kay-Bee Pictures
- Distributed by: Mutual Film
- Release date: September 25, 1914 (USA)
- Running time: 2 reels
- Country: USA
- Language: Silent (English intertitles)

The Death Mask is a 1914 American short drama film directed and produced by Thomas H. Ince and featuring Sessue Hayakawa and Tsuru Aoki in prominent roles.

== Plot ==
According to a film magazine, "Running Wolf, the son of the High Chief of a Southland tribe, is fascinated by the vision of an Indian maiden which appears to him at intervals. He repulses gently the advances of Nona, a maiden of his own tribe, to the sorrow of his father. One Bear, an exhausted Indian, staggers into the camp and tells them of a tribe of fierce Indians far to the north, called the Tribe of the Three Brothers. He also describes a beautiful Indian girl whom Running Wolf recognizes as the girl of his dreams.

He journeys north to secure the Indian maid. He arrives, defeats the two brothers in battle, and the Indians calls upon the third terrible brother who always wears a grotesque mask over his face and whom they regard with superstitious awe. Running Wolf previously sheltered the Indian princess who was lost in a rain storm. The terrible third brother appears on the scene, but Running Wolf makes a dash for him and he retreats. The chase leads into the forest, where Running Wolf unmasks the mysterious personage and reveals the face of Nona, the maiden of his own tribe. They make their escape back to the village of his father."

== Censorship ==
The Chicago Board of Censors cut out scenes of stabbing during a duel and the wiping of blood from knives.

Full film
