= Desert Thieves =

1914 film

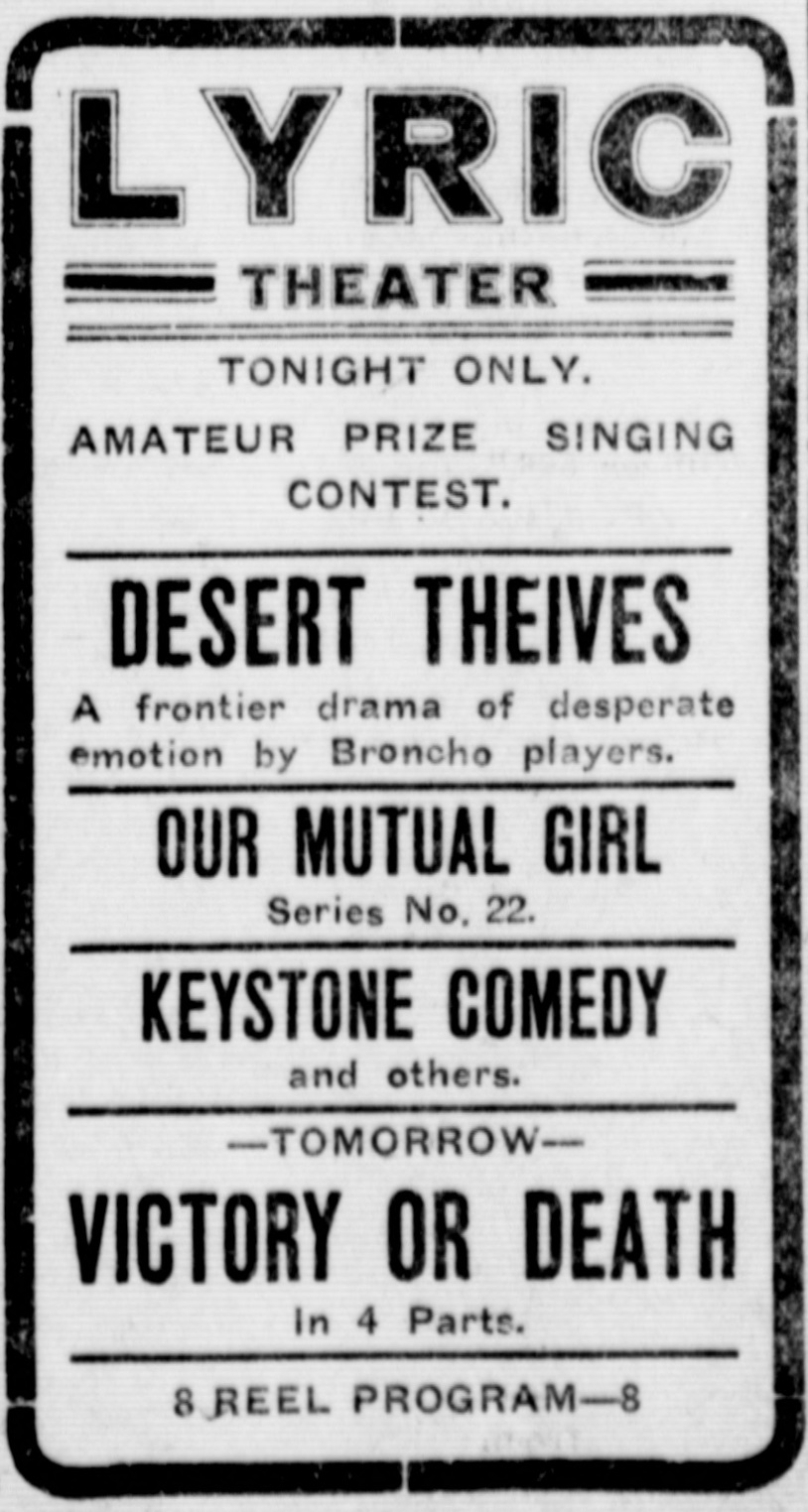
- Contemporary advertisement
- Directed by: Scott Sidney
- Written by: Richard V. Spencer
- Produced by: Thomas H. Ince
- Starring: Charles Ray; Gretchen Lederer; Tsuru Aoki; Frank Keenan; Ernest Swallow
- Production company: Broncho Film Company
- Distributed by: Mutual Film
- Release date: June 24, 1914 (USA)
- Country: United States
- Languages: Silent; English intertitles

Desert Thieves is a 1914 American short silent Western film directed by Scott Sidney and featuring Charles Ray, Gretchen Lederer, Tsuru Aoki, Frank Keenan and Ernest Swallow in lead roles.

== Plot ==
As described in a film magazine, "Dave Graham, a prospector, meets with an accident, falling down a steep precipice. Painted Feather, an Indian chief, happens along and hears Graham calling for help. He goes to his rescue, bringing him to his camp, where his sister, Owanono, nurses him. She falls in love with Dave and shows him where a lost gold mine is situated, at the same time showing him some nuggets that have come from the mine.

In the meantime Mr. and Mrs. Blake from a mining camp are caught cheating in a game of poker and sent over the desert, where Mr. Blake is overcome with exhaustion. She manages her way to Dave's log cabin and pleads with him to go and rescue her husband, which he does. He falls in love with Mrs. Blake and she knowing this tries to make him believe that she is going to desert her husband for him, the three of them going to the desert. When they reach the desert Mrs. Blake and her husband knock Dave unconscious and try to get the bags of gold nuggets from him. When they have done this, they are very much surprised to find that the bags do not contain gold nuggets, only rocks. When Blake finds out that the bags contain only rocks, be curses and threatens to kill his wife, hut she grasps the revolver and accidentally kills him. In the meantime Dave is struggling to get out of his bonds. After she has killed her husband she attempts to go back where Dave is and being lost accidentally runs up against him. They are both lost in a sandstorm on the desert."

== Cast ==
- Charles Ray
- Gretchen Lederer
- Tsuru Aoki as Owanono
- Frank Keenan
- Ernest Swallow

== Reception ==
Moving Picture World gave the film a negative review, describing the film as having "An utter lack of anything pleasing or elevating in the story."
