= Love's Sacrifice (film) =

1914 film

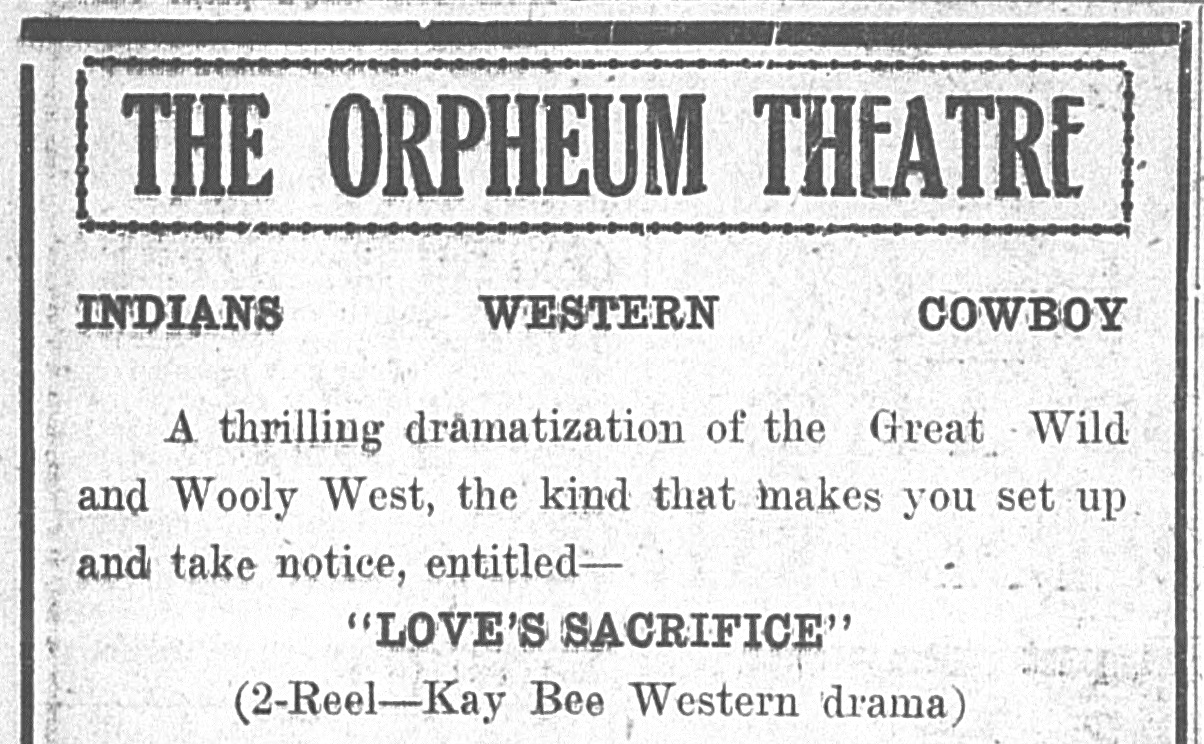
- Contemporary advertisement
- Directed by: George Osborne
- Production company: Kay-Bee Pictures
- Distributed by: Mutual Film
- Release date: May 1, 1914 (USA)
- Running time: 2 reels
- Country: United States
- Languages: Silent; English intertitles

Love's Sacrifice is a 1914 American short silent Western film directed by George Osborne and featuring William Ehfe, Tsuru Aoki, Black Bull and Virginia Philley Withey in important roles.

== Plot ==
As described in a film magazine, "Exiled from Mexico, Don Jose, a wealthy Spanish grandee, crosses the border and is captured by a band of Indians under Chief Black Bull. All of those in the caravan are killed, with the exception of Don Jose's baby daughter, who has been secreted under the wagon train.

Black Bull takes the child into his tribe and brings her up like one of his own children. Years later, John Cobb and his partner become lost in the desert. Cobb is found unconscious beside the body of his partner by Black Bull's adopted daughter, now known as Little Fawn. Cobb is taken to the Indian village. There he falls in love with his rescuer, Little Fawn, and marries her.

Soon after an Eastern financier offers to buy the mining claim which Cobb and his dead partner had been working before they became lost in the desert. Cobb sells out at a good price and takes his bride back East to Washington, where he introduces her as a Spanish lady.

At a reception in Cobb's home two of the Indians in Black Bull's tribe who come to Washington to see the Great White Father, visit Little Fawn, as they continue to call her. Their visit greatly scandalizes society women at the reception and believing Little Fawn to be an Indian they snub and "cut" her until the girl's spirit is crushed.

Little Fawn steals away and travels overland to the reservation, Cobb follows her, but too late. Black Bull, after revealing the secret of her birth, points out the mound that marks her grave."

== Cast ==
- William Ehfe as John Cobb - The Husband
- Tsuru Aoki as Little Fawn
- Black Bull as The Indian Chief
- Virginia Philley Withey as Little Fawn as a Child
