= Mother of the Shadows =

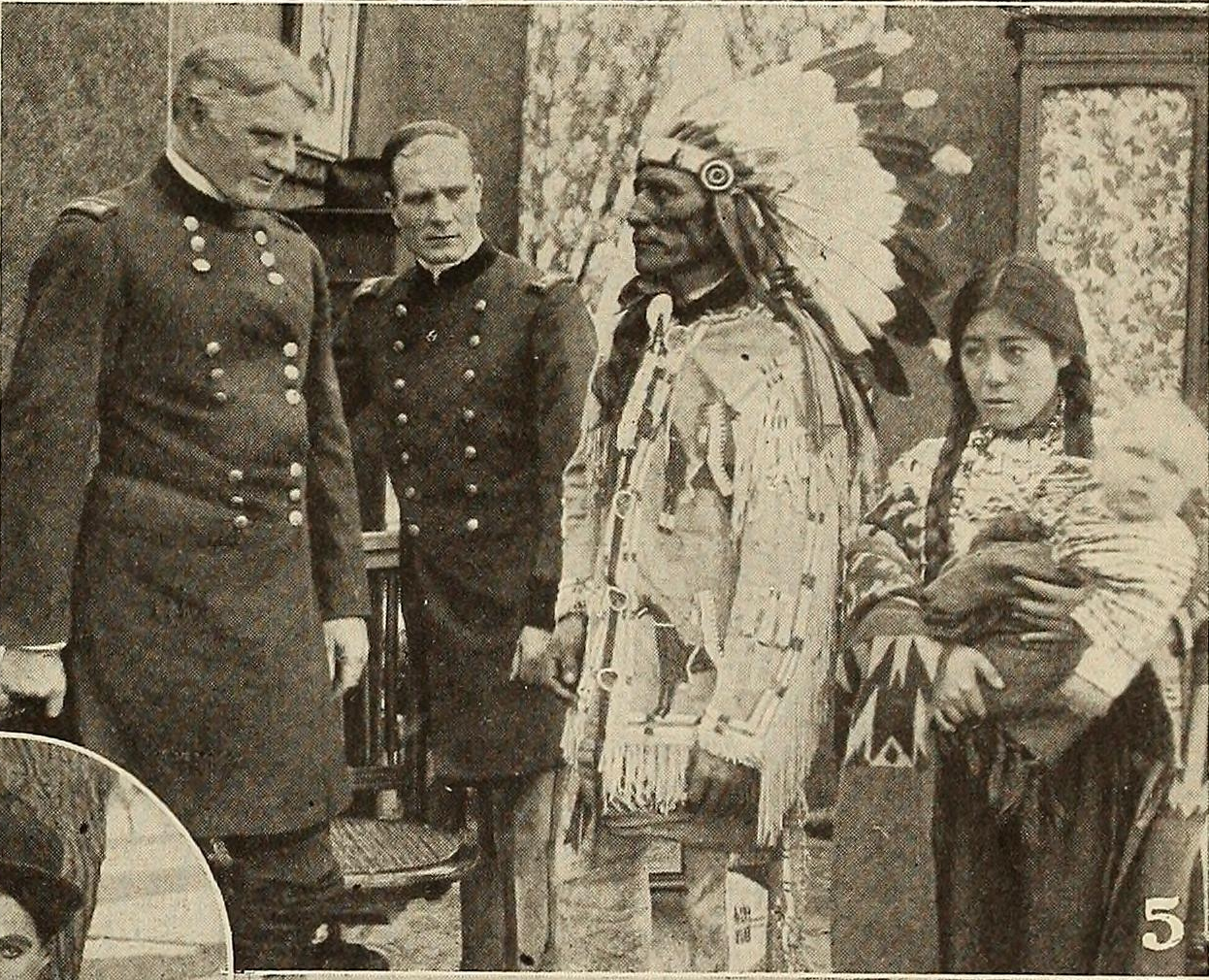
- J. Barney Sherry, Joe Goodboy, and Tsuru Aoki in a publicity still
- Directed by: George Osborne
- Starring: Tsuru Aoki; Sessue Hayakawa; John Keller; Joe Goodboy; J. Barney Sherry
- Production company: Kay-Bee Pictures
- Distributed by: Mutual Film
- Release date: December 4, 1914 (USA)
- Running time: 20 min.
- Country: USA
- Language: Silent (English intertitles)

Mother of the Shadows is a 1914 American short silent drama film directed by George Osborne and featuring Tsuru Aoki, Sessue Hayakawa, John Keller, Joe Goodboy and J. Barney Sherry in important roles.

== Plot ==
According to a film magazine, "Laughing Moon loves Lieutenant Eldridge, who confesses to being the father of her child, and at the Colonel's command, he marries her. In time the Indian girl realizes that her American husband is ashamed of her — and when she overhears him say that when their son is older he also will be ashamed of his shapeless, parchment skinned squaw mother, her heart is broken. Not long after this, the Sioux chief quarrels with the Colonel, and one of the chiefs warriors is placed under arrest at the post. The Indians attack the post, and the Sioux prisoner throws open a gate which guards the Colonel's quarters and runs to rally his tribesmen and lead them thither. Realizing that the gate must be held at any cost, Laughing Moon thrusts her arm through the bar slot, in place of the wooden bar which the Indian has thrown away. The Sioux try to batter down the gate, chopping through at her arm and badly wounding her. But she manages to hold on till a detachment of soldiers arrive. Eldridge is very proud of his wife. But she has determined that her son shall remember her only as the Indian princess who saved the fort. She opens the bandages binding her wounds — and when they find her, she is dead."

== Cast ==
- Sessue Hayakawa as Running Elk
- Tsuru Aoki as Laughing Moon
- John Keller as Lieut. Harry Eldridge
- Joe Goodboy as Crooked Horn
- J. Barney Sherry as The Colonel
