= Star of the North (film) =

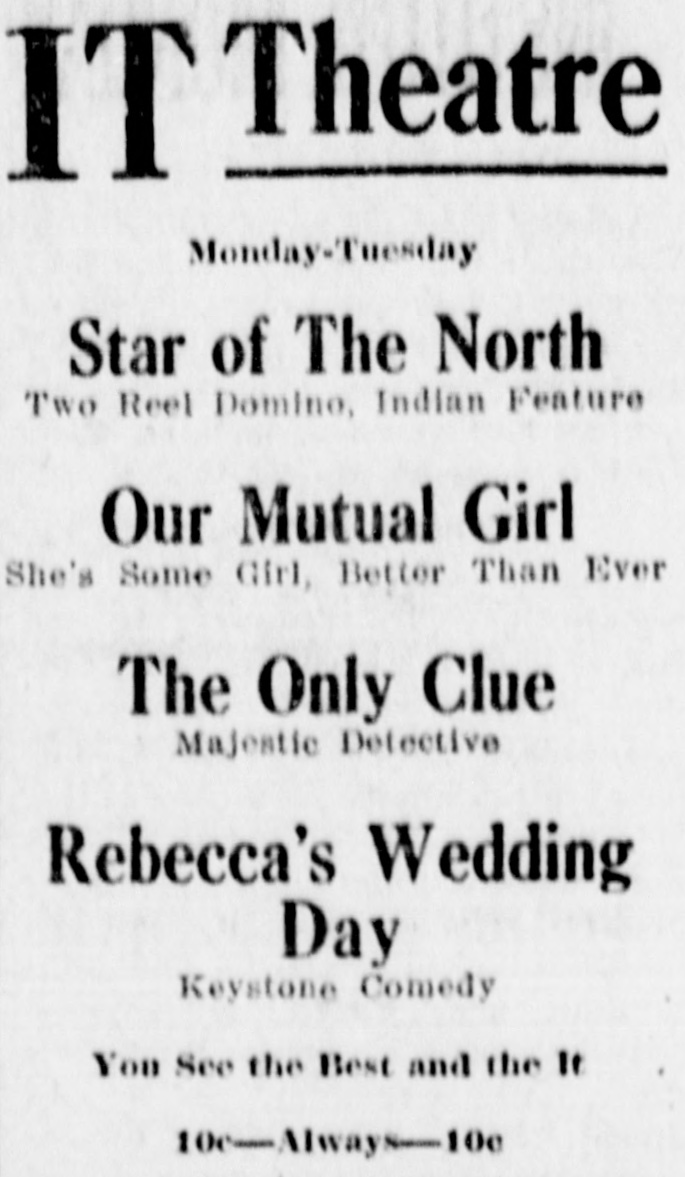
- Contemporary advertisement
- Directed by: Thomas H. Ince; Jay Hunt
- Produced by: Thomas H. Ince
- Starring: Tsuru Aoki; J. Frank Burke; Herschel Mayall; Ernest Swallow
- Production company: Domino Film Company
- Distributed by: Mutual Film
- Release date: July 16, 1914 (USA)
- Running time: 20 minutes
- Country: United States
- Language: Silent

Star of the North is a 1914 American silent short adventure film directed by Thomas H. Ince and Jay Hunt. Tsuru Aoki, J. Frank Burke, Herschel Mayall and Ernest Swallow played important roles in the film.

== Plot ==
According to a film magazine, "Star of the North, daughter of Iron Heart, a Sioux War Chief, is in love with Owahtonah. Black Kettle, a Cheyenne chief, hearing of her beauty, comes to her father's village to pay court to her. Iron Heart accepts the presents of Black Kettle, and betrothes his daughter to the visiting chief. Star of the North and Black Kettle leave for the Cheyenne Chief's Village. The first night they camp their horses are frightened by a bear. While Black Kettle is away looking after the horses, Star of the North escapes and takes refuge in a deserted cabin. Black Kettle, unable to trail Star of the North in the darkness, gives up the pursuit until dawn. The Indian girl, tired out, goes to sleep in the cabin, but is rudely awakened by Jim Holt, renegade trapper, who returns to his cabin after a night's debauch at the saloon. After a struggle with him, she escapes, takes his horses and goes to her lover, Owahtonah. Fearing punishment by her father for her broken engagement, Star of the North and her lover leave the village and seek refuge with another tribe."

== Cast ==
- Tsuru Aoki as Star of the North
- Ernest Swallow as Owahtonah
- J. Frank Burke as Black Kettle
- Hershell Mayall as Jim Holt
