= Sessue Hayakawa =

Japanese actor (1886–1973)

- 早川 雪洲
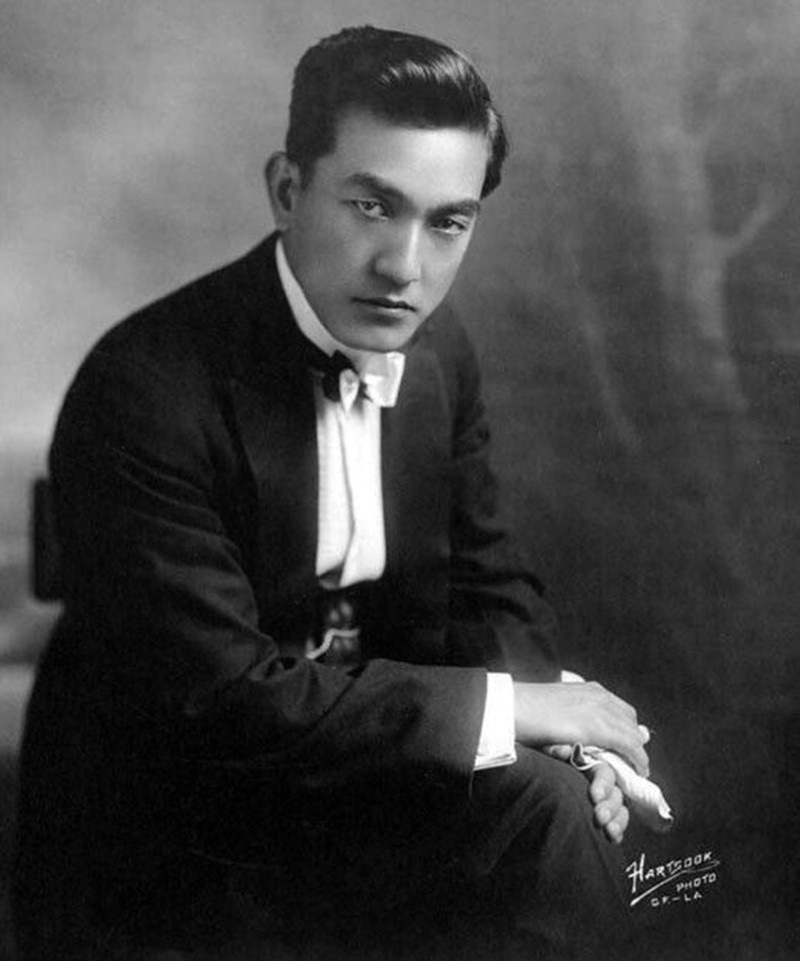
- Hayakawa in 1918
- Born: Kintarō Hayakawa; June 10, 1886; Minamibōsō, Chiba, Japan
- Died: November 23, 1973 (aged 87); Chiyoda, Tokyo, Japan
- Occupations: Actor; film producer; writer
- Years active: 1913–1967
- Spouse: Tsuru Aoki (m. 1914; died 1961)
- Children: 3

Signature (Japanese)
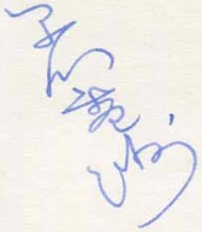

Kintarō Hayakawa (Note: Japanese: 早川 金太郎, romanized: Hayakawa Kintarō) (June 10, 1886 – November 23, 1973), known professionally as Sessue Hayakawa, (Note: Japanese: 早川 雪洲, Hepburn: Hayakawa Sesshū) was a Japanese actor. He was a popular star and matinée idol in Hollywood during the silent film era of the 1910s and early 1920s. Hayakawa was the first actor of Asian descent to achieve stardom as a leading man in the United States and Europe. His "broodingly handsome" good looks and typecasting as a sexually dominant villain made him a heartthrob among American women during a time of racial discrimination, and he became one of the first male sex symbols of Hollywood.

After withdrawing from the Japanese naval academy and attempting suicide at 18, Hayakawa attended the University of Chicago, where he studied political economics in accordance with his wealthy parents' wish that he become a banker. Upon graduating, he traveled to Los Angeles to board a scheduled ship back to Japan, but tried acting in Little Tokyo. Hayakawa impressed Hollywood figures and was signed to star in The Typhoon (1914). He made his breakthrough in The Cheat (1915), and became famous for his roles as a forbidden lover. Hayakawa was one of the highest-paid stars of his time, earning $5,000 per week in 1915 and $2 million per year through his own production company from 1918 to 1921. Because of rising anti-Japanese sentiment and business difficulties, Hayakawa left Hollywood in 1922 and performed on Broadway and in Japan and Europe for many years before making his Hollywood comeback in Daughter of the Dragon (1931).

Of his talkies, Hayakawa is probably best known for his role as Colonel Saito in The Bridge on the River Kwai (1957), which earned him a nomination for the Academy Award for Best Supporting Actor, and the pirate captain in Swiss Family Robinson (1960). Hayakawa starred in over 80 feature films, and three of his films (The Cheat, The Dragon Painter, and The Bridge on the River Kwai) stand in the United States National Film Registry.

== Early life ==
Kintarō Hayakawa (早川 金太郎, Hayakawa Kintarō) was born on June 10, 1886, in the village of Nanaura, later part of a town called Chikura, in the city of Minamibōsō in Chiba Prefecture, Japan. From a young age, he yearned to go overseas and took on English studies in preparation. His father was the head of a fishermen's union with some wealth. He had five siblings.

From an early age, Hayakawa's family intended him to become an officer in the Imperial Japanese Navy. However, while a student at the naval academy in Etajima, he swam to the bottom of a lagoon (he grew up in a shellfish diving community) on a dare and ruptured his eardrum. The injury caused him to fail the navy physical. His father felt shame and embarrassment by his son's failure, and this drove a wedge between them. The strained relationship drove the 18-year-old Hayakawa to attempt seppuku (ritual suicide). One evening, Hayakawa entered a shed on his parents' property and prepared the venue. He put his dog outside and attempted to uphold his family's samurai tradition by stabbing himself more than 30 times in the abdomen. The barking dog brought Hayakawa's parents to the scene, and his father used an axe to break down the door, saving his life.

After he recovered from the suicide attempt, Hayakawa moved to the United States and began to study political economics at the University of Chicago to fulfill his family's new wish that he become a banker. While a student, he reportedly played quarterback for the football team and was once penalized for using jujitsu to bring down an opponent. Hayakawa graduated from the University of Chicago in 1912 and subsequently made plans to return to Japan. Hayakawa traveled to Los Angeles and awaited a transpacific steamship. During his stay, he discovered the Japanese Theatre in Little Tokyo and became fascinated with acting and performing plays.

However, the above account, is disputed in part or whole. According to Professor of Japanese language and literature at UC San Diego Daisuke Miyao, Hayakawa's turn to acting was in reality less eventful; there is no record of Hayakawa having attended University of Chicago or having played sports there. Hayakawa's acting career instead likely followed a series of odd jobs in California: as a dishwasher, waiter, ice cream vendor, and factory worker; his theatrical appearances also were just another temporary pursuit. Another revisionist account by author Orie Nakagawa holds that Hayakawa had always intended to go to California to find work under his older brother in San Francisco; his father, however, convinced him to study at Chicago instead, and Hayakawa did so for a year before leaving to return to his original pursuits.

== Career ==
=== Early career ===
Hayakawa began his acting career in 1913. It was around this time that Hayakawa first assumed the stage name Sessue (雪洲, Sesshū), meaning "snowy continent" (雪 means "snow" and 洲 means "continent"). One of the productions in which Hayakawa performed was called The Typhoon. Tsuru Aoki, a member of the acting troupe, was so impressed with Hayakawa's abilities and enthusiasm that she enticed film producer Thomas H. Ince to see the play. Ince saw the production and offered to turn it into a silent film with the original cast. Eager to return to Japan, Hayakawa tried to dissuade Ince by requesting the astronomic fee of $500 a week, but Ince agreed to his request.

The Typhoon (1914) became an instant hit and was followed by two additional pictures produced by Ince, The Wrath of the Gods (1914) co-starring Hayakawa's new wife, Aoki, and The Sacrifice (1914). With Hayakawa's rising stardom, Jesse L. Lasky soon offered Hayakawa a contract, which he accepted, making him part of Famous Players–Lasky (now Paramount Pictures).

=== Stardom ===
White women were willing to give themselves to a Japanese man. [...] When Sessue was getting out of his limousine in front of a theater of a premiere showing, he grimaced a little because there was a puddle. Then, dozens of female fans surrounding his car fell over one another to spread their fur coats at his feet.

— Tōyō Miyatake, a celebrity photographer in early 1900s Los Angeles

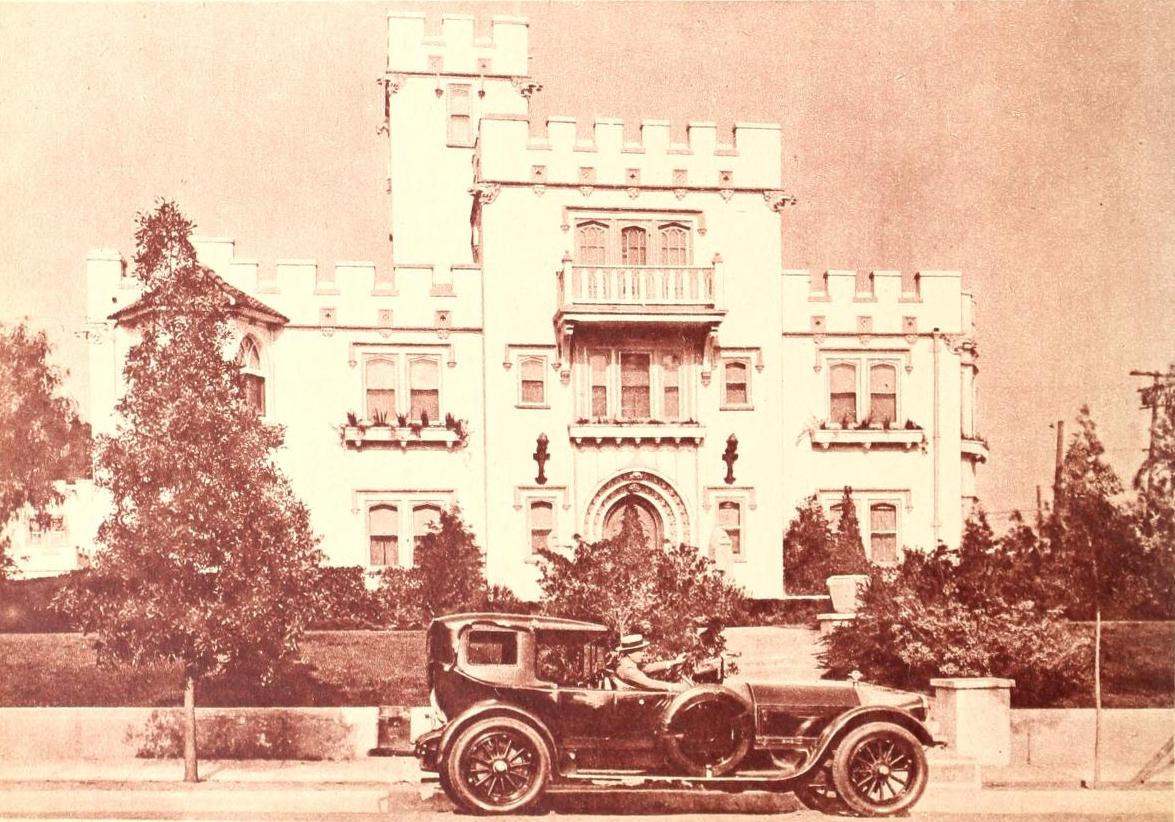
Sessue Hayakawa in front of his "castle" house in his car, 1922

Hayakawa's second film for Famous Players–Lasky was The Cheat (1915), directed by Cecil B. DeMille. The Cheat co-starred Fannie Ward as Hayakawa's love interest and was a huge success, making Hayakawa a romantic idol and sex symbol to the female movie-going public. "It caused a sensation," says Stephen Gong, the executive director of San Francisco's Center for Asian American Media. "The idea of the rape fantasy, forbidden fruit, all those taboos of race and sex—it made him a movie star. And his most rabid fan base was white women." With his popularity and "broodingly handsome" good looks, Hayakawa commanded a salary that reached over $3,500 a week at the height of his fame in 1919. In 1917, he built his residence, a castle-styled mansion, at the corner of Franklin Avenue and Argyle Street in Hollywood, which was a local landmark until it was demolished in 1956.

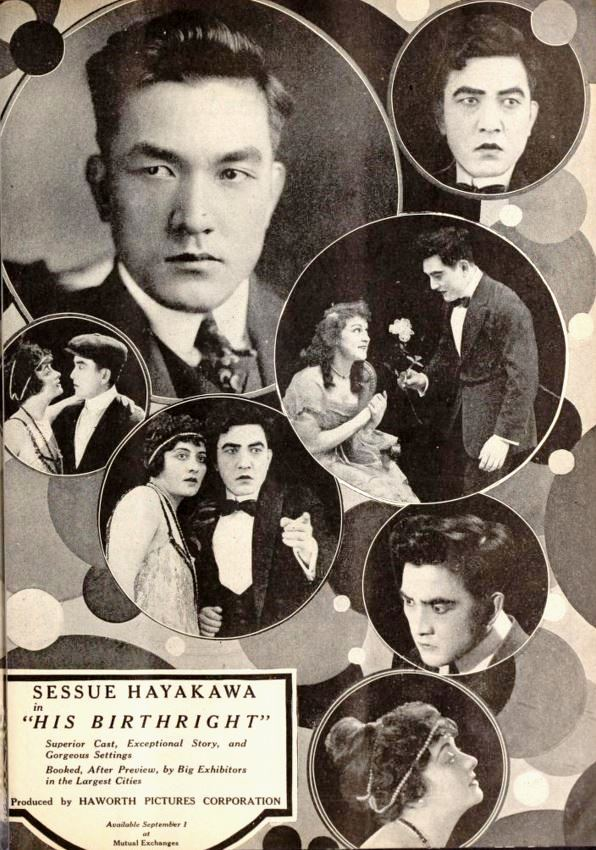
Advertisement in Exhibitors Herald for the American drama film His Birthright with Hayakawa, Marin Sais, and Mary Anderson, 1918

Following The Cheat, Hayakawa became a leading man for romantic dramas in the 1910s and early 1920s. He also began acting in Westerns and action films. He sought roles but, dissatisfied with being constantly typecast, Hayakawa decided to form his own production company. There is some lack of clarity on how Haworth Pictures Corporation got its original funding. Hayakawa himself gave two different versions. The first was in his autobiography; he tells of William Joseph Connery, a fellow University of Chicago alumnus, introducing him to A.B.C. Dohrmann, the president of a china and glassware company in San Francisco who was willing to pay one million dollars to establish the company. In the second version, Connery's parents were multimillionaire coal mine owners who provided the million dollars.

A few scenes of Sessue Hayakawa acting in the 1919 film The Dragon Painter

Over the next three years, Hayakawa produced 23 films and had earned $2 million by 1920, with which he was able to pay back the $1 million he had borrowed from Connery. Hayakawa produced, starred in, and contributed to the design, writing, editing, and directing of the films. Critics hailed Hayakawa's understated, Zen-influenced acting style. Hayakawa sought to bring muga, or the "absence of doing", to his performances, in direct contrast to the then-popular studied poses and broad gestures. In 1918, Hayakawa personally chose the American serials actress Marin Sais to appear opposite him in a series of films, the first being the racial drama The City of Dim Faces (1918), followed by His Birthright (1918), which also starred Aoki. His collaboration with Sais ended with Bonds of Honor (1919). Hayakawa also appeared opposite Jane Novak in The Temple of Dusk (1918) and Aoki in The Dragon Painter (1919). According to Goldsea Hayakawa's fame rivaled that of Douglas Fairbanks, Charlie Chaplin and John Barrymore. Hayakawa drove a gold plated Pierce-Arrow and entertained lavishly in his "Castle", which was known as the scene of some of Hollywood's wildest parties. Shortly before Prohibition took effect in 1920, he bought a large supply of liquor, leading him to joke that he owed his social success to his liquor supply. He took Aoki on a trip to Monaco where he gambled at the Monte Carlo Casino.

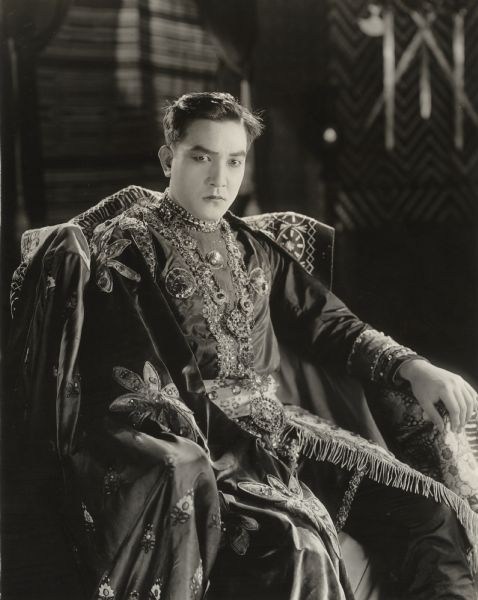
Hayakawa costumed as the Prince of the Island of Desire in a publicity still for the 1920 silent fantasy film The Beggar Prince

Hayakawa left Hollywood in 1922; different authors give various explanations such as prevailing anti-Japanese sentiment and business difficulties. Nakagawa focuses on three events in particular: first, on the set of The Swamp (1921), his appendix ruptured and while he was at the hospital there was an attempt to usurp his insurance money; second, there was a baseless tabloid report that Aoki had attempted suicide; and third, Hayakawa believed there was an attempt on his life by the Robertson-Cole Pictures Corporation (accused of supporting anti-Japanese legislation) by the collapse of an unsafe earthquake sequence on the set of The Vermilion Pencil in order to gain insurance money, leading to his suing the studio. He visited Japan with Aoki for the first time since he had come to the US. He returned soon afterwards, however and played the lead role in Tiger Lily on Broadway in 1923. The next decade and a half also saw him perform in Japan and Europe. In London, Hayakawa starred in The Great Prince Shan (1924) and The Story of Su (1924). In 1925, he wrote a novel, The Bandit Prince, and adapted it into a short play. In 1930, Hayakawa performed in Samurai, a one-act play written specifically for him, in front of Great Britain's King George V and Queen Mary. Hayakawa became widely known in France, where audiences "enthusiastically embraced" him and made his French debut, La Bataille (1923) (also produced by Robertson-Cole Pictures Corporation), a critical and financial success. German audiences found Hayakawa "sensational" and in Russia he was considered one of the "wonderful actors" of America. In addition to numerous Japanese films, Hayakawa also produced a Japanese-language stage version of The Three Musketeers. In the initial decades of his career, Hayakawa established himself as the first leading man of Asian descent in American and European cinema. He was also the first non-Caucasian actor to achieve international stardom.

=== Later career and retirement ===
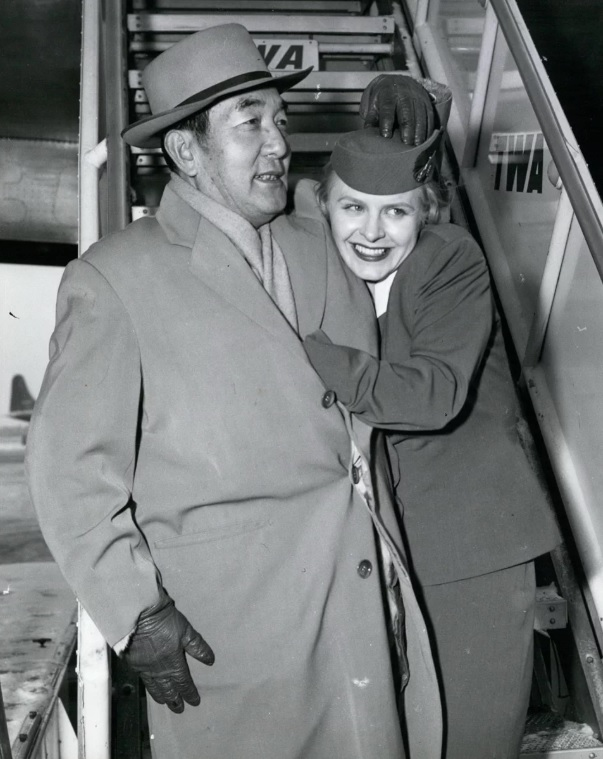
Hayakawa with a flight attendant in New York, c. 1960

Returning to the United States again in 1926 to appear on Broadway—and later in vaudeville—Hayakawa opened a Zen temple and study hall on New York's Upper West Side. Hayakawa later transitioned into doing talkies; his return to Hollywood and sound film debut came in Daughter of the Dragon (1931), starring opposite Chinese American performer Anna May Wong. His accent did not go over well when sound was added to movies. Hayakawa played a samurai in the German-Japanese co-production The Daughter of the Samurai (1937). The same year, Hayakawa went to France to perform in Yoshiwara (1937), but was trapped in the country and separated from his family upon the German occupation of France in 1940. Hayakawa made few films in the following years, but supported himself financially by selling his watercolor paintings. He became friends with writer Jirōhachi Satsuma who was also trapped in France. Goldsea states that he joined the French Resistance and helped Allied flyers during World War II, although Hayakawa states that he mainly helped the local Japanese community during the war and after. His nomadic lifestyle continued until 1950.

In 1949, Humphrey Bogart's production company located Hayakawa and offered him a role in Tokyo Joe. Before issuing a work permit, the American Consulate investigated Hayakawa's activities during the war and found that he had in no way contributed to the German war effort. Hayakawa followed Tokyo Joe with Three Came Home (1950), in which he played real-life POW camp commander Lieutenant-Colonel Suga, before returning to France.

After the war, Hayakawa's on-screen roles can best be described as "the honorable villain", a figure exemplified by his portrayal of Colonel Saito in The Bridge on the River Kwai (1957). The film won the Academy Award for Best Picture and Hayakawa earned a nomination for the Best Supporting Actor; he was also nominated for a Golden Globe. He called the role the highlight of his career. Thereafter, Hayakawa largely retired from acting. He stated after appearing in Hell to Eternity (1960), that he would only star in two more films, with the American-Japanese co-production The Big Wave (1961) becoming the first of the two.

Throughout the following years he performed guest appearances on a handful of television shows (including Wagon Train, Route 66, Studio One, Kraft Theatre, and the comedy series The Red Skelton Hour.) and films, both in the American and in East Asian cinema, making his final major performance in the animated film The Daydreamer (1966).

During his late life, Hayakawa dedicated himself to Zen Buddhism, became an ordained Zen master, worked as a private acting coach, and wrote his autobiography Zen Showed Me the Way.

== Racial barriers ==
Throughout Hayakawa's career, many segments of American society were filled with feelings of anti-Japanese sentiment, partly from nationalism rising from World War I and World War II. Hayakawa was constantly typecast as a villain or forbidden lover and was unable to play parts that would be given to white actors such as Douglas Fairbanks. Hayakawa stated, "Such roles [in The Wrath of the Gods, The Typhoon, and The Cheat] are not true to our Japanese nature... They are false and give people a wrong idea of us. I wish to make a characterization which shall reveal us as we really are." In 1949, he lamented, "My one ambition is to play a hero". Hayakawa's dilemma was analogous to that of Rudolph Valentino, nine years his junior; both were foreign born, and were typecast as exotic or forbidden lovers. Although Hayakawa's contract with Famous Players expired in May 1918, the studio still asked him to star in The Sheik. Hayakawa refused in order to start his own company. With influence from June Mathis, the role went to the barely known Valentino, turning him into a screen icon overnight.

Writing to the "What the Picture Did for Me" section of the Exhibitors Herald in March 1922, a theater owner in Denison, Iowa, with a population of about 3,500, revealed the mixed feelings about Hayakawa in middle America (and the language used to describe him): "The Jap is sure a good actor, but some people don't seem to like him." In 1930, the Production Code came into effect (enforced after 1934) which forbade portrayals of miscegenation in film. This meant that unless Hayakawa's co-star was an Asian actress, he would not be able to portray a romance with her. Hayakawa was placed in this awkward position due to his ethnicity. Naturalization laws at that time prevented him from becoming a U.S. citizen and because of anti-miscegenation laws, he could not marry someone of another race.

Hayakawa's early films were not popular in Japan because many felt that his roles portrayed Japanese men as sadistic and cruel. Many Japanese viewers found this portrayal insulting. Nationalistic groups in particular were censorious. Some Japanese believed that Hayakawa was contributing to increased anti-Japanese sentiment in the U.S., and regarded him as a traitor to the Japanese people. After Hayakawa established himself as an American superstar, the negative tone in the press that regarded him as a national and racial shame lessened by a noticeable degree, and Japanese media started publicizing Hayakawa's cinematic achievements instead. His later films were also not popular, because he was seen as "too Americanized" during a time of nationalism.

== Personal life ==
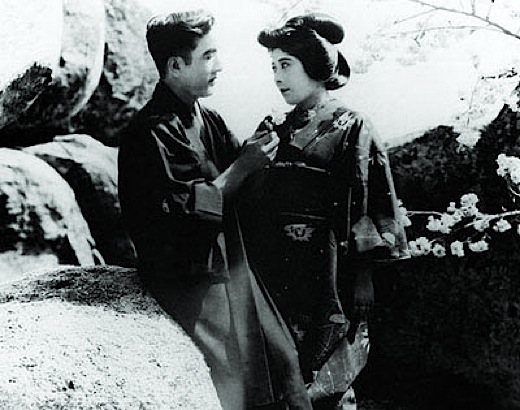
Hayakawa and his wife, Tsuru Aoki, in the 1919 film The Dragon Painter

On May 1, 1914, Hayakawa married fellow Issei performer Tsuru Aoki, who co-starred in several of his films. Hayakawa had an affair with a white actress, Ruth Noble, a fellow vaudeville performer who had co-starred with him in The Bandit Prince. Noble gave birth to a son, Alexander Hayes, but gave Hayakawa custody of the child. Sessue and Aoki adopted him, changing his name to Yukio, and they raised and educated him in Japan. Later, they adopted two more daughters: Yoshiko, an actress, and Fujiko, a dancer. Aoki died in 1961.

Physically, Hayakawa possessed "an athlete's physique and agility". A 1917 profile on Hayakawa stated that he "is proficient in jiu-jitsu, an expert fencer, and can swim like a fish. He is a good horseman and plays a fast tennis racket. He is tall for a Japanese, being 5 ft 7.5 in (171.5 cm) in height, and weighs 157 pounds (71 kg)."

Hayakawa was known for his discipline and martial arts skills. While filming The Jaguar's Claws, in the Mojave Desert, Hayakawa played a Mexican bandit, with 500 cowboys as extras. On the first night of filming, the extras drank all night and well into the next day. No work was being done, so Hayakawa challenged the group to a fight. Two men stepped forward. Hayakawa said, "The first one struck out at me. I seized his arm and sent him flying on his face along the rough ground. The second attempted to grapple and I was forced to flip him over my head and let him fall on his neck. The fall knocked him unconscious." Hayakawa then disarmed yet another cowboy. The extras returned to work, amused by the way the small man manhandled the big bruising cowboys.

== Death ==
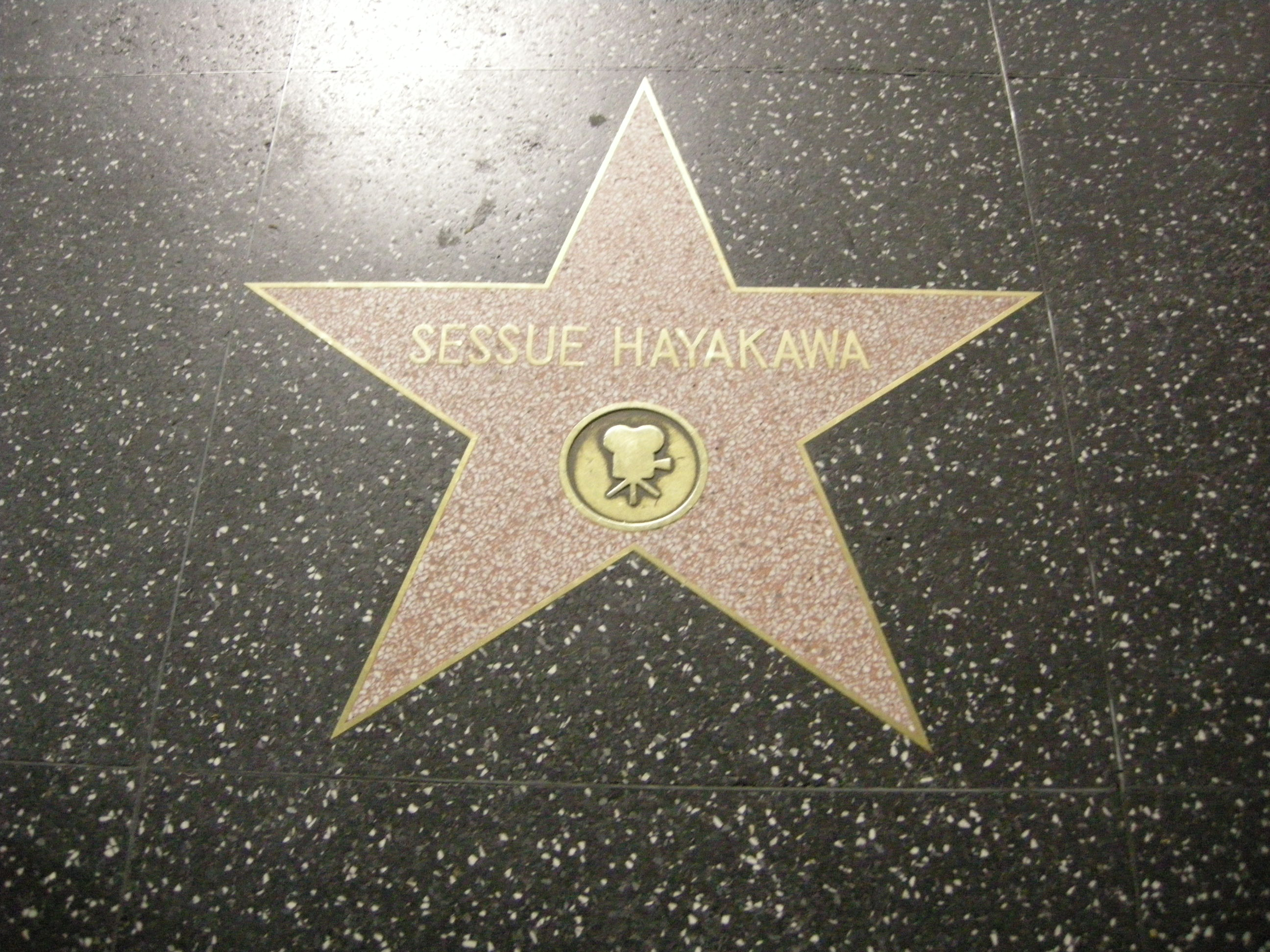
Hayakawa's star on the Hollywood Walk of Fame

Hayakawa retired from film in 1966. He died in Tokyo on November 23, 1973 from a cerebral thrombosis, complicated by pneumonia. He was buried in the Chokeiji Temple Cemetery in Toyama, Japan.

== Legacy ==
Many of Hayakawa's films are lost. Most of his later works, including The Bridge on the River Kwai, The Geisha Boy, Swiss Family Robinson, Tokyo Joe, and Three Came Home are available on DVD. In 1960, Hayakawa was awarded a star on the Hollywood Walk of Fame at 1645 Vine Street, in Hollywood, Los Angeles, California for his contributions to the motion picture industry.

A musical based on Hayakawa's life, Sessue, was performed in Tokyo in 1989. In September 2007, the Museum of Modern Art hosted a retrospective on Hayakawa's work entitled: Sessue Hayakawa: East and West, When the Twain Met. Japanese film director Nagisa Oshima planned to create a biopic entitled Hollywood Zen based on Hayakawa's life. The script was allegedly completed and set to film in Los Angeles, but due to constant delays and the death of Oshima in 2013, the project has yet to be filmed.

In 2020, Hayakawa's life story was told as part of PBS's documentary Asian Americans.

His legacy is lasting, especially in the Asian-American community. Media professor Karla Rae Fuller wrote in 2010: "What is even more remarkable about Hayakawa's precedent-setting career in Hollywood as an Asian American is the fact that he is virtually ignored in film history as well as star studies. [...] Furthermore, the fact that he reached such a rare level of success whereby he could form and run his own production company makes his omission from the narrative of Hollywood history even more egregious."

== Selected filmography ==
Since Hayakawa appeared in roughly 100 films during his over five-decade career, the following is a selection of significant productions; a more comprehensive list is covered in a separate article.

- The Wrath of the Gods (1914)
- The Typhoon (1914)
- The Cheat (1915)
- His Birthright (1918)
- The Dragon Painter (1919)
- The Vermilion Pencil (1922)
- Daughter of the Dragon (1931)
- The Daughter of the Samurai (1937)
- Tokyo Joe (1949)
- Three Came Home (1950)
- House of Bamboo (1955)
- The Bridge on the River Kwai (1957)
- The Geisha Boy (1958)
- Green Mansions (1959)
- Hell to Eternity (1960)
- Swiss Family Robinson (1960)
- The Big Wave (1961)
- The Daydreamer (1966)

== See also ==
- Portrayal of East Asians in Hollywood
- Stereotypes of East Asians in American media

== Bibliography ==
- Miyao, Daisuke (2007). Sessue Hayakawa: Silent Cinema and Transnational Stardom. United States: Duke University Press. ISBN 978-0-8223-3969-4.
