= List of Film Booking Offices of America films =

The following is a list of films produced or distributed by the American company Film Booking Offices of America (FBO) prior to its merger with RKO Pictures. The list does not include foreign-produced films distributed in the United States by FBO.

== 1910s ==
Title	Release date	Director	Notes
Mickey	August 1918	F. Richard Jones	
The Girl of My Dreams	December 1918	Louis Chaudet	Lost film
All of a Sudden Norma	January 1919	Howard Hickman	Lost film
Hoop-La	January 1919	Louis Chaudet	Presumed lost
Life's a Funny Proposition	January 1919	Thomas N. Heffron	Presumed lost
The Long Lane's Turning	February 1919	Louis Chaudet	
The Prodigal Liar	February 1919	Thomas N. Heffron	Presumed lost
A Trick of Fate	February 1919	Howard Hickman	Lost film
What Every Woman Wants	February 1919	Jesse D. Hampton	Presumed lost
A Heart in Pawn	March 1919	William Worthington	Presumed lost
Hearts Asleep	March 1919	Howard Hickman	Lost film
The Lamb and the Lion	March 1919	Francis J. Grandon	Presumed lost
The Courageous Coward	April 1919	William Worthington	Incomplete film, with the final reel preserved at the EYE Film Institute Netherlands
The Love Call	April 1919	Louis Chaudet	Presumed lost
Modern Husbands	April 1919	Francis J. Grandon	Presumed lost
Whitewashed Walls	April 1919	Park Frame	Presumed lost
His Debt	May 1919	William Worthington	Presumed lost
Josselyn's Wife	May 1919	Howard Hickman	Lost film
Just Squaw	May 1919	George E. Middleton	Presumed lost
The Mints of Hell	May 1919	Park Frame	Presumed lost
Bare-Fisted Gallagher	June 1919	Joseph Franz	Lost film
In Search of Arcady	June 1919	Bertram Bracken	Presumed lost
The Man Who Turned White	June 1919	Park Frame	Lost film Fragments exist at the Library of Congress
Tangled Threads	June 1919	Howard Hickman	Lost film
Better Times	July 1919	King Vidor	A copy is held at the EYE Film Institute Netherlands
The Man Beneath	July 1919	William Worthington	A copy is held at the EYE Film Institute Netherlands
A Man's Country	July 1919	Henry Kolker	Lost film A fragment was discovered at the Danish Film Institute
Man's Desire	July 1919	Lloyd Ingraham	Presumed lost
The Woman Michael Married	July 1919	Henry Kolker	Lost film
The Other Half	August 1919	King Vidor	
The Pagan God	August 1919	Park Frame	Presumed lost
The Gray Horizon	August 1919	William Worthington	Presumed lost
A Sagebrush Hamlet	August 1919	Joseph Franz	An incomplete copy is held at the Library of Congress
Dangerous Waters	September 1919	Park Frame, Joseph Franz	Presumed lost
The Dragon Painter	September 1919	William Worthington	
For a Woman's Honor	September 1919	Park Frame	Lost film
Her Purchase Price	September 1919	Howard Hickman	Lost film
The House of Intrigue	September 1919	Lloyd Ingraham	Presumed lost
Back to God's Country	October 1919	David Hartford	
Bonds of Honor	October 1919	William Worthington	Presumed lost
The Gray Wolf's Ghost	October 1919	Park Frame, Joseph Franz	Presumed lost
Kitty Kelly, M.D.	October 1919	Howard Hickman	Presumed lost
The Open Door	October 1919	Dallas M. Fitzgerald	Presumed lost
The Blue Bandanna	November 1919	Joseph Franz	Presumed lost
The Broken Butterfly	November 1919	Maurice Tourneur	A copy is held at the Centre national du cinéma et de l'image animée
A Fugitive from Matrimony	November 1919	Henry King	Presumed lost
The Illustrious Prince	November 1919	William Worthington	Presumed lost
Poor Relations	November 1919	King Vidor	Presumed lost
Beckoning Roads	December 1919	Howard Hickman	Presumed lost
Haunting Shadows	December 1919	Henry King	Presumed lost
Heart of Juanita	December 1919	George E. Middleton	Presumed lost
The Pleasant Devil	December 1919	Christy Cabanne	Presumed lost
The Tong Man	December 1919	William Worthington	A copy is preserved at the Library of Congress

== 1920s ==
Title	Release date	Director	Notes
The Beggar Prince	January 1920	William Worthington	Lost film
The Third Generation	January 1920	Henry Kolker	Presumed lost
The Flame of Hellgate	February 1920	George E. Middleton	Presumed lost
The Forbidden Woman	February 1920	Harry Garson	A copy is held at the Library of Congress
The Luck of Geraldine Laird	February 1920	Edward Sloman	Lost film
Who's Your Servant?	February 1920	Julian Johnson	Lost film
The White Dove	March 1920	Henry King	An incomplete copy is held at the Centre national du cinéma et de l'image animée
A Woman Who Understood	March 1920	William Parke	Lost film
The Brand of Lopez	April 1920	Joseph De Grasse	Presumed lost
Bright Skies	April 1920	Henry Kolker	Presumed lost
The Butterfly Man	April 1920	Louis J. Gasnier	Lost film
The Devil's Claim	May 1920	Charles Swickard	Incomplete copies are held at the George Eastman Museum
The Fortune Teller	May 1920	Albert Capellani	Lost film
The Notorious Mrs. Sands	May 1920	Christy Cabanne	Lost film
The Third Woman	April 1920	Charles Swickard	Presumed lost
The Wonder Man	May 1920	John G. Adolfi	Presumed lost
Heart of Twenty	June 1920	Henry Kolker	Presumed lost
Uncharted Channels	June 1920	Henry King	Presumed lost
Li Ting Lang	July 1920	Charles Swickard	A copy is held at Gosfilmofond
Moon Madness	July 1920	Colin Campbell	Lost film
An Arabian Knight	August 1920	Charles Swickard	Presumed lost
Life's Twist	August 1920	Christy Cabanne	Presumed lost
Big Happiness	September 1920	Colin Campbell	Lost film
Occasionally Yours	September 1920	James W. Horne	Presumed lost
So Long Letty	October 1920	Al Christie	
The Stealers	October 1920	Christy Cabanne	Presumed lost
813	November 1920	Scott Sidney	Lost film
Kismet	November 1920	Louis J. Gasnier	
A Slave of Vanity	November 1920	Henry Otto	Lost film
The Little 'Fraid Lady	December 1920	John G. Adolfi	Presumed lost
Seeing It Through	December 1920	Claude Mitchell	Presumed lost
The First Born	January 1921	Colin Campbell	A copy is held at the BFI National Archive
The Mistress of Shenstone	February 1921	Henry King	An abridged version is held at Filmoteca de Catalunya
One Man in a Million	February 1921	George Beban	Presumed lost
The Servant in the House	February 1921	Jack Conway	Lost film
Seven Years Bad Luck	February 1921	Max Linder	
See My Lawyer	March 1921	Al Christie	Presumed lost
What's a Wife Worth?	March 1921	Christy Cabanne	Presumed lost
Good Women	April 1921	Louis J. Gasnier	Presumed lost
If Women Only Knew	April 1921	Edward H. Griffith	
Nobody's Kid	April 1921	Howard C. Hickman	Presumed lost
Beach of Dreams	May 1921	William Parke	Presumed lost
Black Roses	May 1921	Colin Campbell	Presumed lost
Cold Steel	May 1921	Sherwood MacDonald	Lost film
Salvage	June 1921	Henry King	Lost film
The Greater Profit	July 1921	William Worthington	Lost film
Hearts and Masks	July 1921	William A. Seiter	Presumed lost
Live and Let Live	July 1921	Christy Cabanne	Presumed lost
Shams of Society	September 1921	Thomas B. Walsh	Presumed lost
The Sting of the Lash	September 1921	Henry King	Presumed lost
Where Lights Are Low	September 1921	Colin Campbell	Presumed lost
A Wife's Awakening	September 1921	Louis J. Gasnier	Presumed lost
The Barricade	October 1921	Christy Cabanne	Presumed lost
The Foolish Age	October 1921	William A. Seiter	Presumed lost
The Swamp	October 1921	Colin Campbell	A copy is preserved at the Gosfilmofond
The Lure of Jade	November 1921	Colin Campbell	Presumed lost
Silent Years	November 1921	Louis J. Gasnier	Presumed lost
At the Stage Door	December 1921	Christy Cabanne	Presumed lost
The Duke of Chimney Butte	December 1921	Frank Borzage	Presumed lost
Eden and Return	December 1921	William A. Seiter	Presumed lost
Billy Jim	January 1922	Frank Borzage	Presumed lost
Two Kinds of Women	January 1922	Colin Campbell	Lost film
Five Days to Live	January 1922	Norman Dawn	Presumed lost
Beyond the Rainbow	February 1922	Christy Cabanne	A copy is held at the UCLA Film and Television Archive
The Call of Home	February 1922	Louis J. Gasnier	Presumed lost
Boy Crazy	March 1922	William A. Seiter	Lost film
The Fire Bride	March 1922	Arthur Rosson	Presumed lost
The Vermilion Pencil	March 1922	Norman Dawn	Lost film
The Blonde Vampire	April 1922	Wray Physioc	Presumed lost
The Bootleggers	April 1922	Roy Sheldon	Lost film
The First Woman	April 1922	Glen Lyons	Presumed lost
Gay and Devilish	May 1922	William A. Seiter	Presumed lost
The Glory of Clementina	May 1922	Emile Chautard	Lost film
The Son of the Wolf	June 1922	Norman Dawn	Presumed lost
The Understudy	June 1922	William A. Seiter	Presumed lost
Colleen of the Pines	July 1922	Chester Bennett	Presumed lost
The Kickback	July 1922	Val Paul	Presumed lost
My Dad	July 1922	Clifford Smith	Presumed lost
In the Name of the Law	August 1922	Emory Johnson	Lost film
Up and at 'Em	August 1922	William A. Seiter	A copy is held at the Lobster Film Archive
The Snowshoe Trail	September 1922	Chester Bennett	
The Broadway Madonna	October 1922	Harry Revier	Presumed lost
Good Men and True	November 1922	Val Paul	Lost film
Thelma	November 1922	Chester Bennett	Presumed lost
Captain Fly-by-Night	December 1922	William K. Howard	
The Third Alarm	December 1922	Emory Johnson	
When Love Comes	December 1922	William A. Seiter	Presumed lost
Canyon of the Fools	January 1923	Val Paul	A copy is held at the Library of Congress
The Bishop of the Ozarks	February 1923	Finis Fox	Lost film
Fighting Blood	February 1923	Malcolm St. Clair, Henry Lehrman	Serial; Presumed lost
Stormswept	February 1923	Robert Thornby	A copy is held at the BFI National Archive
Can a Woman Love Twice?	March 1923	James W. Horne	Presumed lost
The Fourth Musketeer	March 1923	William K. Howard	Presumed lost
Crashin' Thru	April 1923	Val Paul	Lost film
The West~Bound Limited	April 1923	Emory Johnson	
Mary of the Movies	May 1923	John McDermott	An incomplete copy is held at the Ngā Taonga Sound & Vision
The Remittance Woman	May 1923	Wesley Ruggles	Lost film
Divorce	June 1923	Chester Bennett	Presumed lost
Human Wreckage	June 1923	John Griffith Wray	Lost film
The Mysterious Witness	June 1923	Seymour Zeliff	Lost film
Desert Driven	July 1923	Val Paul	Presumed lost
The Flying Dutchman	July 1923	Lloyd B. Carleton	Presumed lost
Itching Palms	July 1923	James W. Horne	Presumed lost
The Miracle Baby	August 1923	Val Paul	Lost film
Breaking Into Society	September 1923	Hunt Stromberg	Presumed lost
Daytime Wives	September 1923	Émile Chautard	Presumed lost
The Fair Cheat	September 1923	Burton L. King	Lost film
Haldane of the Secret Service	September 1923	Harry Houdini	
The Dancer of the Nile	October 1923	William P.S. Earle	Lost film
Blow Your Own Horn	November 1923	James W. Horne	Presumed lost
The Love Pirate	November 1923	Richard Thomas	Presumed lost
Lights Out	December 1923	Alfred Santell	Presumed lost
Fashionable Fakers	December 1923	William Worthington	Presumed lost
The Mailman	December 1923	Emory Johnson	Incomplete
After the Ball	January 1924	Dallas M. Fitzgerald	Presumed lost
Judgment of the Storm	January 1924	Del Andrews	A copy is held at the Centre national du cinéma et de l'image animée
The Lullaby	January 1924	Chester Bennett	Presumed lost
The Mask of Lopez	January 1924	Albert S. Rogell	Presumed lost
Alimony	February 1924	James W. Horne	Presumed lost
By Divine Right	February 1924	Roy William Neill	Lost film
Damaged Hearts	February 1924	T. Hayes Hunter	Presumed lost
North of Nevada	February 1924	Albert S. Rogell	Presumed lost
Phantom Justice	February 1924	Richard Thomas	Presumed lost
The White Sin	February 1924	William A. Seiter	A copy is preserved at the Library of Congress
Galloping Gallagher	March 1924	Albert S. Rogell	Incomplete, 29 minutes survive
Yankee Madness	March 1924	Charles R. Seeling	Presumed lost
A Girl of the Limberlost	April 1924	James Leo Meehan	Lost film
His Forgotten Wife	April 1924	William A. Seiter	A copy is held at the Library of Congress
The Silent Stranger	April 1924	Albert S. Rogell	Lost film
The Danger Line	May 1924	Édouard-Émile Violet	Presumed lost
The Dangerous Coward	May 1924	Albert S. Rogell	Presumed lost
The Spirit of the USA	May 1924	Emory Johnson	Incomplete, 15 minutes survive
Untamed Youth	May 1924	Emile Chautard	Presumed lost
The Fighting Sap	June 1924	Albert S. Rogell	Presumed lost
The Desert Sheik	July 1924	Tom Terriss	Presumed lost
A Woman Who Sinned	July 1924	Finis Fox	Presumed lost
American Manners	August 1924	James W. Horne	A copy is preserved at the Library of Congress
Fools in the Dark	August 1924	Alfred Santell	Presumed lost
Life's Greatest Game	September 1924	Emory Johnson	Lost film
Stepping Lively	September 1924	James W. Horne	A copy is held at the Centre national du cinéma et de l'image animée
Vanity's Price	September 1924	Roy William Neill	Lost film
The Dangerous Flirt	October 1924	Tod Browning	Lost film
The Millionaire Cowboy	October 1924	Harry Garson	Presumed lost
Thundering Hoofs	October 1924	Albert S. Rogell	A copy is held at the UCLA Film and Television Archive
Broken Laws	November 1924	Roy William Neill	A copy is held at the Cinematheque Royale de Belgique
Laughing at Danger	November 1924	James W. Horne	Copies are held at the Gosfilmofond and the UCLA Film and Television Archive
On the Stroke of Three	November 1924	F. Harmon Weight	Lost film
Silk Stocking Sal	November 1924	Tod Browning	Lost film
Trigger Fingers	November 1924	B. Reeves Eason	Lost film
The Air Hawk	December 1924	Bruce M. Mitchell	Presumed lost
Breed of the Border	December 1924	Harry Garson	Lost film
Cheap Kisses	December 1924	John Ince, Cullen Tate	Lost film
Flashing Spurs	December 1924	B. Reeves Eason	Lost film
The No-Gun Man	December 1924	Harry Garson	Lost film
Midnight Molly	January 1925	Lloyd Ingraham	A copy is held at the BFI National Archive
The Range Terror	January 1925	William James Craft	Presumed lost
Youth and Adventure	January 1925	James W. Horne	Copies are held at Gosfilmofond and Cineteca Italiana
The Cloud Rider	February 1925	Bruce M. Mitchell	A copy is preserved at the Cineteca Italiana
Forbidden Cargo	February 1925	Tom Buckingham	Lost film
Red Blood and Blue	February 1925	James C. Hutchinson	Presumed lost
Galloping Vengeance	March 1925	William James Craft	Presumed lost
Jimmie's Millions	March 1925	James P. Hogan	Presumed lost
Scar Hanan	March 1925	Edward Linden, Ben F. Wilson	Presumed lost
That Devil Quemado	April 1925	Del Andrews	Presumed lost
The Riding Comet	April 1925	Ben F. Wilson	Presumed lost
Tearing Through	April 1925	Arthur Rosson	A copy is held at Gosfilmofond
Alias Mary Flynn	May 1925	Ralph Ince	Lost film
The Bandit's Baby	May 1925	James P. Hogan	Presumed lost
The Fighting Demon	May 1925	Arthur Rosson	Presumed lost
Lilies of the Streets	May 1925	Joseph Levering	Presumed lost
Speed Wild	May 1925	Harry Garson	Presumed lost
The Texas Bearcat	May 1925	B. Reeves Eason	Lost film
White Fang	May 1925	Laurence Trimble	Presumed lost
White Thunder	May 1925	Ben F. Wilson	Presumed lost
Drusilla with a Million	June 1925	F. Harmon Weight	A copy is held at the Lobster Film Archive
High and Handsome	June 1925	Harry Garson	Presumed lost
The Human Tornado	June 1925	Ben F. Wilson	Presumed lost
If Marriage Fails	June 1925	John Ince	Lost film
Parisian Nights	June 1925	Alfred Santell	A copy is held at the Cinematheque Royale de Belgique
Smooth as Satin	June 1925	Ralph Ince	Lost film
Whistling Jim	June 1925	Wilbur McGaugh	Presumed lost
The Wild Bull's Lair	June 1925	Del Andrews	Presumed lost
The Bloodhound	July 1925	William James Craft	Presumed lost
Lady Robinhood	July 1925	Ralph Ince	Lost film Trailer survives
The Mysterious Stranger	July 1925	Jack Nelson	Presumed lost
Heads Up	August 1925	Harry Garson	Presumed lost
The Isle of Hope	August 1925	Jack Nelson	Presumed lost
Let's Go, Gallagher	August 1925	Robert De Lacey	Presumed lost
Ridin' the Wind	August 1925	Del Andrews	Presumed lost
That Man Jack!	August 1925	William James Craft	Presumed lost
The Keeper of the Bees	September 1925	James Leo Meehan	Lost film Trailer survives
A Man of Nerve	September 1925	Louis Chaudet	Presumed lost
Three of a Kind	September 1925	F. Harmon Weight	Lost film
The Wall Street Whiz	September 1925	Jack Nelson	Presumed lost
All Around Frying Pan	November 1925	David Kirkland	Lost film
Broadway Lady	November 1925	Wesley Ruggles	A copy is held at the Library of Congress
The Last Edition	November 1925	Emory Johnson	A copy is held at the EYE Film Institute Netherlands
No Man's Law	November 1925	Del Andrews	Presumed lost
The Ridin' Streak	November 1925	Del Andrews	Presumed lost
The Wyoming Wildcat	November 1925	Robert De Lacey	Presumed lost
The Cowboy Musketeer	December 1925	Robert De Lacey	Presumed lost
Flaming Waters	December 1925	F. Harmon Weight	A copy is held at the Library of Congress
The Midnight Flyer	December 1925	Tom Forman	Presumed lost
The Prince of Pep	December 1925	Jack Nelson	
Smilin' at Trouble	December 1925	Harry Garson	Presumed lost
The Blue Streak	January 1926	Noel M. Smith	Presumed lost
Born to Battle	January 1926	Robert De Lacey	Presumed lost
Man Rustlin'	January 1926	Del Andrews	Presumed lost
Queen o'Diamonds	January 1926	Chester Withey	Presumed lost
The Traffic Cop	January 1926	Harry Garson	Presumed lost
When Love Grows Cold	January 1926	Harry O. Hoyt	Lost film Fragments and a trailer survive
Beyond the Rockies	February 1926	Jack Nelson	
The King of the Turf	February 1926	James P. Hogan	A copy is held at the Cinematheque Royale de Belgique
The Tough Guy	February 1926	David Kirkland	Presumed lost
The Arizona Streak	March 1926	Robert De Lacey	Presumed lost
The Night Patrol	March 1926	Noel M. Smith	
The Non-Stop Flight	March 1926	Emory Johnson	
Secret Orders	March 1926	Chester Withey	Lost film
The Broadway Gallant	April 1926	Noel M. Smith	Presumed lost
The Fighting Boob	April 1926	Jack Nelson	Presumed lost
The Impostor	April 1926	Chester Withey	Presumed lost
The Isle of Retribution	April 1926	James P. Hogan	Lost film
Sir Lumberjack	April 1926	Harry Garson	Presumed lost
Wild to Go	April 1926	Robert De Lacey	Presumed lost
Glenister of the Mounted	May 1926	Harry Garson	Presumed lost
Hands Across the Border	May 1926	David Kirkland	Lost film
The Jade Cup	May 1926	Frank Hall Crane	Presumed lost
The Masquerade Bandit	May 1926	Robert De Lacey	Presumed lost
A Poor Girl's Romance	May 1926	F. Harmon Weight	Presumed lost
The Valley of Bravery	May 1926	Jack Nelson	Presumed lost
The Better Man	June 1926	Scott R. Dunlap	Presumed lost
The Dead Line	June 1926	Jack Nelson	Presumed lost
The Two-Gun Man	June 1926	David Kirkland	Presumed lost
The Cowboy Cop	July 1926	Robert De Lacey	A copy is held at the EYE Film Institute Netherlands
Doubling with Danger	July 1926	Scott R. Dunlap	Presumed lost
Flame of the Argentine	July 1926	Edward Dillon	Lost film
Her Honor, the Governor	July 1926	Chester Withey	
Mulhall's Greatest Catch	July 1926	Harry Garson	Presumed lost
Bigger Than Barnum's	August 1926	Ralph Ince	Presumed lost
The College Boob	August 1926	Harry Garson	Presumed lost
Collegiate	August 1926	Del Andrews	Presumed lost
The Devil's Gulch	August 1926	Jack Nelson	Presumed lost
The Loves of Ricardo	August 1926	George Beban	Presumed lost
The Merry Cavalier	August 1926	Noel M. Smith	Presumed lost
Flashing Fangs	September 1926	Henry McCarty	Presumed lost
Going the Limit	September 1926	Chester Withey	Presumed lost
Hair-Trigger Baxter	September 1926	Jack Nelson	Presumed lost
Kosher Kitty Kelly	September 1926	James W. Horne	An incomplete copy is preservedat the Library of Congress
Laddie	September 1926	James Leo Meehan	Presumed lost
Lone Hand Saunders	September 1926	B. Reeves Eason	Presumed lost
One Minute to Play	September 1926	Sam Wood	Presumed lost
Out of the West	September 1926	Robert De Lacey	Presumed lost
Tom and His Pals	September 1926	Robert De Lacey	Presumed lost
The Dude Cowboy	October 1926	Jack Nelson	Presumed lost
The Adorable Deceiver	October 1926	Phil Rosen	Lost film
The Border Whirlwind	November 1926	John P. McCarthy	Presumed lost
Bred in Old Kentucky	November 1926	Edward Dillon	Presumed lost
Breed of the Sea	November 1926	Ralph Ince	Presumed lost
Is That Nice?	November 1926	Del Andrews	Presumed lost
The Timid Terror	November 1926	Del Andrews	Presumed lost
Flaming Fury	December 1926	James P. Hogan	A copy is held at the Cinematheque Royale Belgique
Red Hot Hoofs	December 1926	Robert De Lacey	Presumed lost
A Regular Scout	December 1926	David Kirkland	Presumed lost
Rose of the Tenements	December 1926	Phil Rosen	Presumed lost
Cactus Trails	January 1927	Scott Pembroke	Lost film
California or Bust	January 1927	Phil Rosen	Presumed lost
Don Mike	January 1927	Lloyd Ingraham	Presumed lost
Her Father Said No	January 1927	Jack McKeown	Presumed lost
Home Struck	January 1927	Ralph Ince	Presumed lost
Lightning Lariats	January 1927	Robert De Lacey	Presumed lost
Uneasy Payments	January 1927	David Kirkland	Presumed lost
Salvation Jane	March 1927	Phil Rosen	Presumed lost
The Sonora Kid	March 1927	Robert De Lacey	Presumed lost
Tarzan and the Golden Lion	March 1927	J.P. McGowan	
The Terror of Bar X	March 1927	Scott Pembroke	Presumed lost
When a Dog Loves	March 1927	J.P. McGowan	Presumed lost
Ain't Love Funny?	April 1927	Del Andrews	Presumed lost
Cyclone of the Range	April 1927	Robert De Lacey	Presumed lost
Naughty Nanette	April 1927	James Leo Meehan	Presumed lost
City of Shadows	May 1927	J.P. McGowan	Presumed lost
The Fighting Hombre	May 1927	Jack Nelson	Presumed lost
Lure of the Night Club	May 1927	Tom Buckingham	Presumed lost
Mother	May 1927	James Leo Meehan	Presumed lost
The Outlaw Dog	May 1927	J.P. McGowan	Presumed lost
Silver Comes Through	May 1927	Lloyd Ingraham	Presumed lost
Splitting the Breeze	May 1927	Robert De Lacey	Presumed lost
Yours to Command	May 1927	David Kirkland	Presumed lost
Bulldog Pluck	June 1927	Jack Nelson	
Ladies Beware	June 1927	Charles Giblyn	Presumed lost
The Magic Garden	June 1927	James Leo Meehan	Presumed lost
The Business Girl	July 1927	David Kirkland	Presumed lost
Galloping Thunder	July 1927	Scott Pembroke	Presumed lost
The Great Mail Robbery	July 1927	George B. Seitz	An incomplete copy is held at the Library of Congress
Tom's Gang	July 1927	Robert De Lacey	Presumed lost
Arizona Nights	August 1927	Lloyd Ingraham	Presumed lost
Breed of Courage	August 1927	Howard M. Mitchell	Presumed lost
The Coward	August 1927	Alfred Raboch	Lost film
Judgment of the Hills	August 1927	James Leo Meehan	Presumed lost
Not for Publication	August 1927	Ralph Ince	Presumed lost
Clancy's Kosher Wedding	September 1927	Arvid E. Gillstrom	Presumed lost
The Flying U Ranch	September 1927	Robert De Lacey	Presumed lost
In a Moment of Temptation	September 1927	Philip Carle	Presumed lost
The Mojave Kid	September 1927	Robert N. Bradbury	Lost film
A Racing Romeo	September 1927	Sam Wood	Presumed lost
Shanghaied	September 1927	Ralph Ince	Presumed lost
The Boy Rider	October 1927	Louis King	Presumed lost
The Cherokee Kid	October 1927	Robert De Lacey	Presumed lost
Jake the Plumber	October 1927	Edward Ludwig	Presumed lost
Ranger of the North	October 1927	Jerome Storm	Presumed lost
Aflame in the Sky	November 1927	J.P. McGowan	Presumed lost
The Bandit's Son	November 1927	Wallace Fox	Presumed lost
The Harvester	November 1927	James Leo Meehan	Presumed lost
Hook and Ladder No. 9	November 1927	F. Harmon Weight	Presumed lost
The Desert Pirate	December 1927	James Dugan	Presumed lost
Legionnaires in Paris	December 1927	Arvid E. Gillstrom	Presumed lost
Little Mickey Grogan	December 1927	James Leo Meehan	Presumed lost
The Slingshot Kid	December 1927	Louis King	Presumed lost
South Sea Love	December 1927	Ralph Ince	Presumed lost
The Swift Shadow	December 1927	Jerome Storm	Presumed lost
Coney Island	January 1928	Ralph Ince	Lost film
Dead Man's Curve	January 1928	Richard Rosson	Presumed lost
Driftin' Sands	January 1928	Wallace Fox	Presumed lost
Wizard of the Saddle	January 1928	Frank Howard Clark	Presumed lost
Fangs of the Wild	February 1928	Jerome Storm	Presumed lost
Her Summer Hero	February 1928	James Dugan	Lost film
The Little Buckaroo	February 1928	Louis King	Presumed lost
The Riding Renegade	February 1928	Wallace Fox	Presumed lost
The Texas Tornado	February 1928	Frank Howard Clark	
Wallflowers	February 1928	James Leo Meehan	Presumed lost
When the Law Rides	February 1928	Robert De Lacey	Presumed lost
Beyond London Lights	March 1928	Tom Terriss	Lost film
Chicago After Midnight	March 1928	Ralph Ince	Lost film
Freckles	March 1928	James Leo Meehan	Presumed lost
Breed of the Sunsets	April 1928	Wallace Fox	Presumed lost
Crooks Can't Win	April 1928	George M. Arthur	Presumed lost
The Devil's Trademark	April 1928	James Leo Meehan	Presumed lost
Law of Fear	April 1928	Jerome Storm	Presumed lost
The Little Yellow House	April 1928	James Leo Meehan	Presumed lost
Phantom of the Range	April 1928	James Dugan	
The Pinto Kid	April 1928	Louis King	Presumed lost
Red Riders of Canada	April 1928	Robert De Lacey	Presumed lost
Skinner's Big Idea	April 1928	Lynn Shores	Presumed lost
Alex the Great	May 1928	Dudley Murphy	Lost film
Man in the Rough	May 1928	Wallace Fox	Presumed lost
Dog Justice	June 1928	Jerome Storm	Presumed lost
The Fightin' Redhead	July 1928	Louis King	Presumed lost
Hit of the Show	July 1928	Ralph Ince	
Sally of the Scandals	July 1928	Lynn Shores	A copy is held at the Centre national du cinéma et de l'image animée
Trail of Courage	July 1928	Wallace Fox	Presumed lost
The Bantam Cowboy	August 1928	Louis King	Presumed lost
Captain Careless	August 1928	Jerome Storm	Presumed lost
Danger Street	August 1928	Ralph Ince	Presumed lost
Lightning Speed	August 1928	Robert N. Bradbury	Presumed lost
The Perfect Crime	August 1928	Bert Glennon	Presumed lost
Terror Mountain	August 1928	Louis King	Presumed lost
The Charge of the Gauchos	September 1928	Albert H. Kelley	
Dog Law	September 1928	Jerome Storm	Presumed lost
Gang War	September 1928	Bert Glennon	Lost film
Stocks and Blondes	September 1928	Dudley Murphy	Presumed lost
Young Whirlwind	September 1928	Louis King	Presumed lost
The Avenging Rider	October 1928	Wallace Fox	Lost film A fragment is held at Gosfilmofond
The Circus Kid	October 1928	George B. Seitz	Presumed lost
Sally's Shoulders	October 1928	Lynn Shores	Lost film
Son of the Golden West	October 1928	Eugene Forde	Presumed lost
The Wreck of the Singapore	October 1928	Ralph Ince	Presumed lost
His Last Haul	November 1928	Marshall Neilan	Presumed lost
King Cowboy	November 1928	Robert De Lacey	Presumed lost
Rough Ridin' Red	November 1928	Louis King	Presumed lost
Sinners in Love	November 1928	George Melford	Presumed lost
Taxi 13	November 1928	Marshall Neilan	A copy is held at Cineteca Nazionale
Tracked	November 1928	Jerome Storm	Presumed lost
Tyrant of Red Gulch	November 1928	Robert De Lacey	Lost film
Blockade	December 1928	George B. Seitz	Presumed lost
Headin' for Danger	December 1928	Robert N. Bradbury	Presumed lost
Hey Rube!	December 1928	George B. Seitz	Presumed lost
Orphan of the Sage	December 1928	Louis King	Presumed lost
Stolen Love	December 1928	Lynn Shores	Lost film
Tropic Madness	December 1928	Robert G. Vignola	Lost film A fragment exists at the BFI National Archive
The Air Legion	January 1929	Bert Glennon	A copy is held at the Cinema Museum, London
Fury of the Wild	January 1929	Leon D'Usseau	
The Jazz Age	January 1929	Lynn Shores	A copy is held at the Library of Congress
Love in the Desert	January 1929	George Melford	Copies are held at the Cinteca Del Friuli and the Centre national du cinéma et de l'image animée
Outlawed	January 1929	Eugene Forde	Presumed lost
Trail of the Horse Thieves	January 1929	Robert De Lacey	Presumed lost
The Voice of the Storm	January 1929	Lynn Shores	Presumed lost
The Yellowback	January 1929	Jerome Storm	Presumed lost
Come and Get It	February 1929	Wallace Fox	Lost film
Gun Law	February 1929	Robert De Lacey	Presumed lost
The One Man Dog	February 1929	Leon D'Usseau	Presumed lost
A Real Girl	February 1929	Ralph Ince	Presumed lost
The Red Sword	February 1929	Robert G. Vignola	Lost film
The Vagabond Cub	February 1929	Louis King	Presumed lost
The Drifter	March 1929	Robert De Lacey	Presumed lost
The Freckled Rascal	March 1929	Louis King	Presumed lost
The Amazing Vagabond	April 1929	Wallace Fox	Presumed lost
Idaho Red	April 1929	Robert De Lacey	Presumed lost
The Big Diamond Robbery	May 1929	Eugene Forde	
The Little Savage	May 1929	Louis King	Presumed lost
The Woman I Love	May 1929	George Melford	Presumed lost
Laughing at Death	June 1929	Wallace Fox	Presumed lost
The Pride of Pawnee	June 1929	Robert De Lacey	Presumed lost
Pals of the Prairie	July 1929	Louis King	Presumed lost

== Bibliography ==
- Munden, Kenneth White. The American Film Institute Catalog of Motion Pictures Produced in the United States, Part 1. University of California Press, 1997.
