= Banzai =

Banzai is a traditional Japanese exclamation meaning "ten thousand years" of long life.

Banzai may also refer to:

== Arts and entertainment ==
=== Music ===
- Banzai, a French disco group; see Euro disco
- Banzai! (album), 1991, by Tigertailz
- "Banzai" (Kaela Kimura song)
- Bonnie Banzai, guitar player and singer in Swedish punkband Asta Kask
- Banzai (album), a 2017 album by Gata Cattana
- "Banzai", a song by Kevin Coyne from his 1982 album Politicz
- "Banzai", a 2025 single by Todoroki Hajime

=== Film and television ===
- Banzaï, a 1983 French film
- Banzai (1918 film), an American film
- Banzai (1997 film), an Italian film
- Banzai (G.I. Joe), a fictional character in the G.I. Joe universe
- Banzai (TV series), a British spoof of Japanese gameshows
- Banzai (The Lion King), a hyena character from the 1994 Disney animated film The Lion King

=== Other uses in arts and entertainment ===
- Banzai! (magazine), the German edition of the Weekly Shōnen Jump manga magazine
- Banzai Drop, a variation of the diving seated senton professional wrestling move
- Anime Banzai, an anime convention in Utah, US

== People with the surname ==
- Ichirō Banzai (坂西 一良; 1891–1945), Japanese general
- Buckaroo Banzai, a fictional movie character

== Other uses ==
- Banzai charge or banzai attack, a last, desperate military charge
- Banzai Cliff, one of the sites of mass Japanese suicide on the island of Saipan during World War II
- Banzai skydive, the act of throwing a parachute out of a plane and trying to catch up to it in mid-fall, put it on, and deploy it before hitting the ground
- Banzai Pipeline, a renowned Hawaiian surfing location
- Banzai, Fujian, a town in Pinghe County, Fujian, China

== See also ==
- Bonsai (disambiguation)
