= Haworth Pictures Corporation =

Film studio

Haworth Pictures Corporation was a film studio established by Japanese actor Sessue Hayakawa in March 1918.

Haworth Pictures Corporation was Hollywood’s first Asian-owned production company.

== Filmography ==
- His Birthright (1918)
- The Temple of Dusk (1918)
- Banzai (1918, short)
- Bonds of Honor (1919)
- A Heart in Pawn (1919)
- The Courageous Coward (1919)
- His Debt (1919)
- The Man Beneath (1919)
- The Gray Horizon (1919)
- The House of Intrigue (1919)
- The Dragon Painter (1919)
- Bonds of Honor (1919)
- The Illustrious Prince (1919)
- The Tong Man (1919)
- The Beggar Prince (1920)
- The Brand of Lopez (1920)
- The Devil's Claim (1920)
- Li Ting Lang (1920)
- An Arabian Knight (1920)
- The Power of Love (1922)

== Bibliography ==
- Miyao, Daisuke (2007). Sessue Hayakawa: Silent Cinema and Transnational Stardom. Duke University Press. ISBN 978-0-8223-3969-4. OCLC 470908395.
