= Li Ting Lang =

1920 film by Charles Swickard

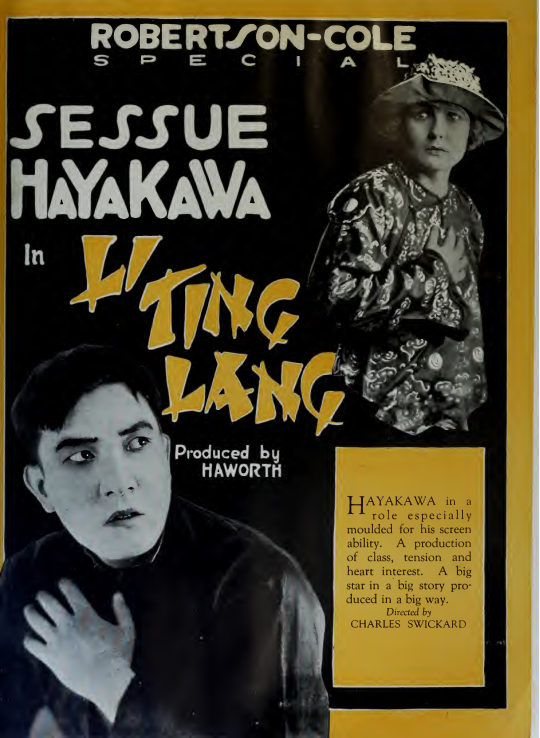
- Ad published in Film Daily
- Directed by: Charles Swickard
- Written by: E. Richard Schayer (story & scenario)
- Produced by: Haworth Pictures Corporation
- Starring: Sessue Hayakawa; Doris Pawn
- Release date: July 24, 1920
- Running time: 50 minutes
- Country: United States
- Language: Silent (English intertitles)

Li Ting Lang is a 1920 American silent drama film directed by Charles Swickard and produced by Sessue Hayakawa's Haworth Pictures Corporation. The film was based on the short story Li Ting Lang, Chinese Gentleman, by Howard P. Rockey, which was published in the December 1916 issue of The Green Book Magazine. A print of Li Ting Lang exists in the Gosfilmofond film archive in Moscow, Russia.

== Plot ==
Li Ting Lang is a Chinese prince studying at an American university. His classmates called him "Old Ting-a-Ling" and don't know that he is royalty. Li falls in love with wealthy Marion Halstead, who had been dating one of his college friends.

LI and Marion announce their engagement, but Marion is socially ostracized, so Li releases her from her promise to him. He then considers suicide. An emissary comes to America with instructions to force Li to return to China, drugs the prince, and Li wakes up on a ship bound for his homeland. His college friends believe the missing student killed himself. Years later Marion marries the other man who had been courting her.

During the 1911 Revolution, Li Tang Lang becomes a general of the revolutionary army. Marion goes to China on her honeymoon, sees and recognizes Li. She goes to his home, but is followed by men who plan to murder her and blame her death on the general. Li Ting Lang defends Marion, and she leaves China with her husband.

== Cast ==
- Sessue Hayakawa as Li Ting Lang
- Allan Forrest as Rob Murray
- Charles Mason as Red Dalton (credited as Charles E. Mason)
- Doris Pawn as Marion Halstead
- Frances Raymond as Priscilla Mayhew
- Marc Robbins as Prince Nu Chang
