= Beauty and the Bad Man =

1925 film

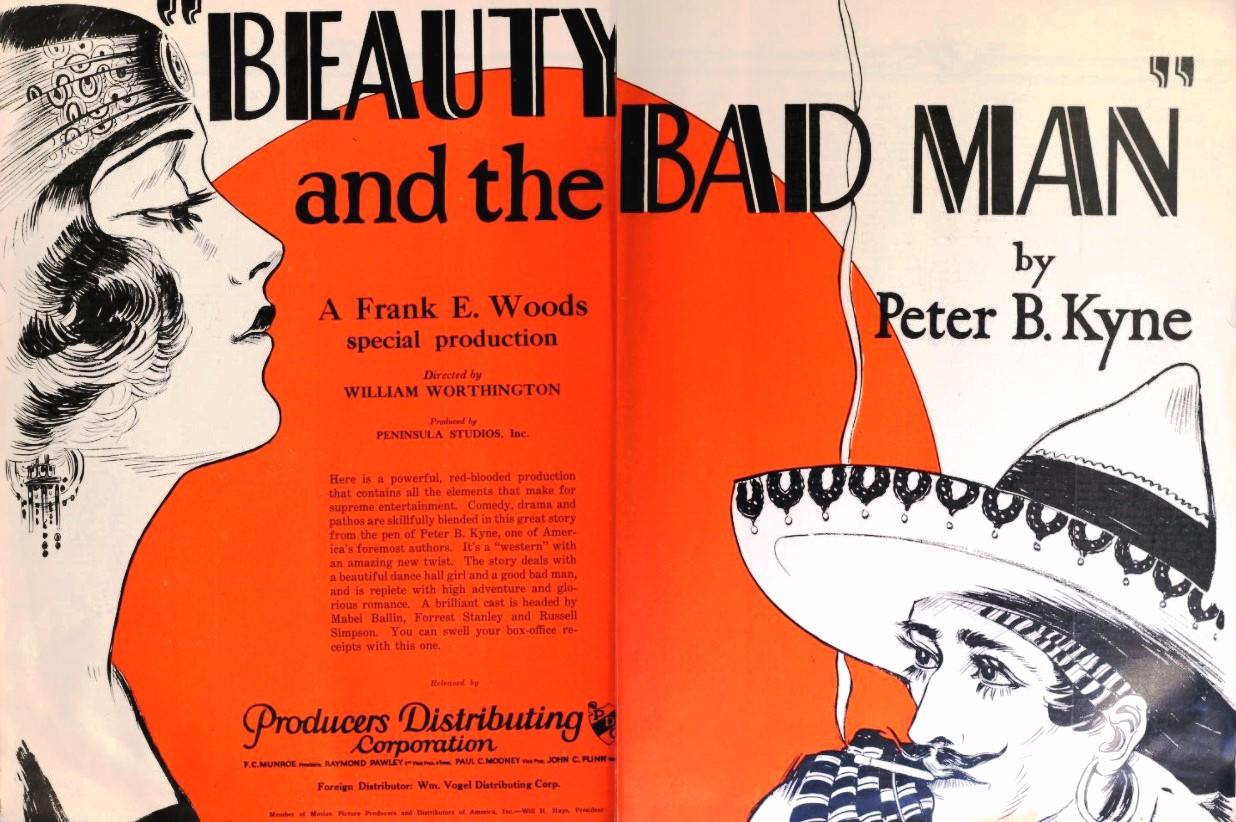
- Advertisement
- Directed by: William Worthington
- Written by: Richard Schayer; Frank E. Woods
- Based on: "Cornflower Cassie's Concert" by Peter B. Kyne
- Starring: Mabel Ballin; Forrest Stanley; Russell Simpson
- Production company: Peninsula Studios
- Distributed by: Producers Distributing Corporation
- Release date: March 29, 1925
- Running time: 60 minutes
- Country: United States
- Languages: Silent; English intertitles

Beauty and the Bad Man is a lost 1925 American silent Western film directed by William Worthington and starring Mabel Ballin, Forrest Stanley, and Russell Simpson.

== Plot ==
As described in a film magazine review, Cassie, an orphan with vocal abilities, enters the mining town after fleeing from her worthless husband of one day. She meets the gambler, who likes her and stakes her with the money he won after breaking the bank. She uses the money to cultivate her voice, and then returns to the mining town famous. Her old husband wants her to return, and when she refuses he fires a gun, but he is late and is winged by a friend of the gambler. Cassie then realizes her love for the gambler.

== Cast ==
- Mabel Ballin as Cassie
- Forrest Stanley as Madoc Bill
- Russell Simpson as Chuckwalla Bill
- George Beranger as L.I.B. Bell
- Edna Mae Cooper as Mayme
- James Gordon as Gold Hill Cassidy

== Preservation ==
With no prints of Beauty and the Bad Man located in any film archives, it is a lost film.
