= Bonsai (disambiguation) =

Bonsai is the art of growing small trees and plants.

Bonsai may also refer to:

== Films ==
- Bonsai (2011 film), a 2011 Chilean film
- Bonsai (2018 film), a 2018 Indian film

== Other uses ==
- Bonsai Kitten, an internet hoax promoting the "art" of shaping animals' bodies

== See also ==
- Banzai (disambiguation)
- Bonzai Records, a Belgium-based record label
- Peter Bondra (born 1968), hockey player whose nickname is "Bonzai"
- Cassia "Bonzai" O'Reilly, Irish singer-songwriter
