= The Temple of Dusk =

1918 film by James Young

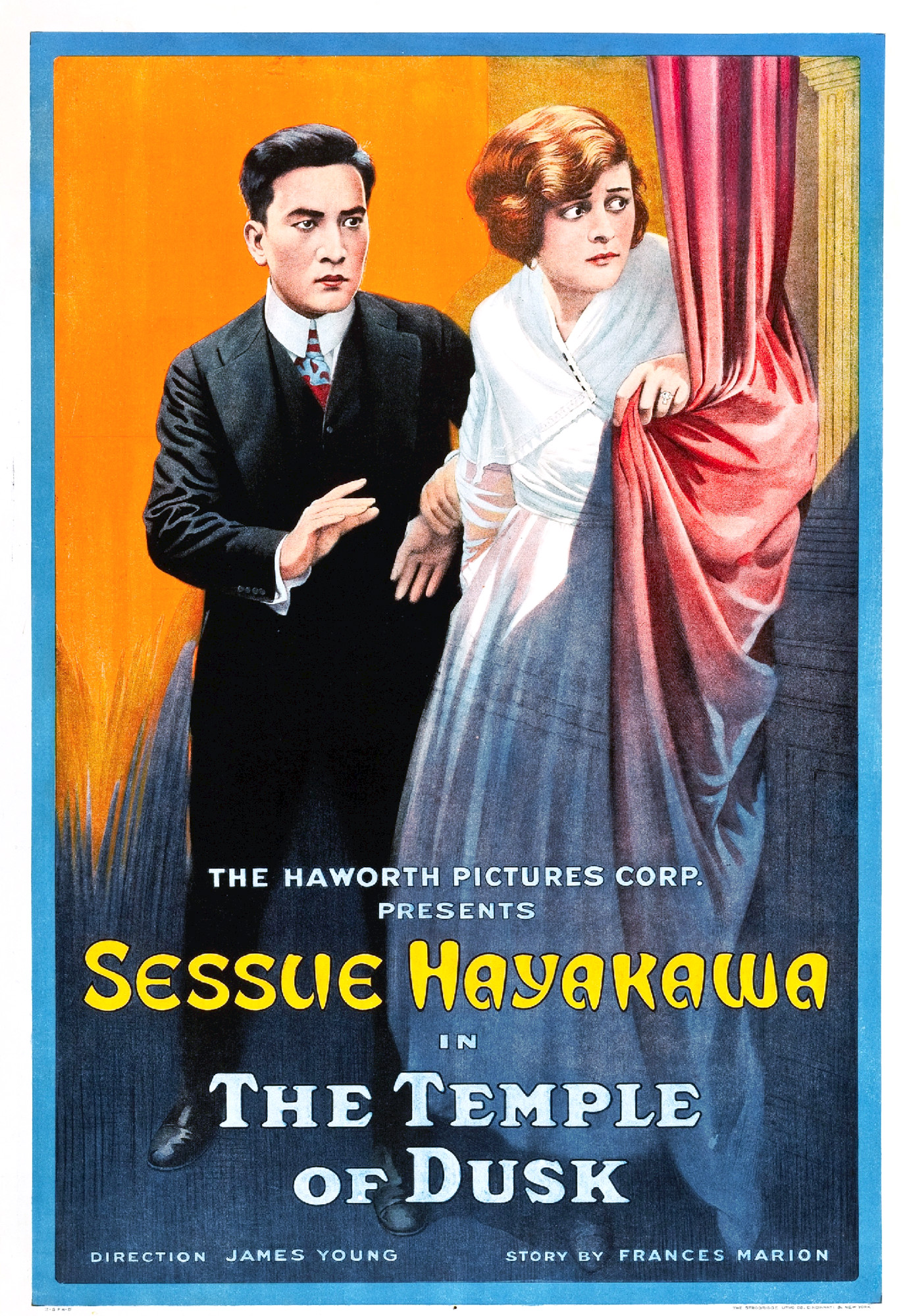
- Poster for film
- Directed by: James Young
- Screenplay by: Frances Marion
- Story by: Frances Marion
- Starring: Sessue Hayakawa; Jane Novak; Louis Willoughby; Mary Jane Irving
- Cinematography: Dal Clawson
- Production company: Haworth Pictures Corporation
- Distributed by: Mutual Film
- Release date: October 20, 1918 (USA)
- Running time: 50 min.
- Country: United States
- Language: Silent (English intertitles)

The Temple of Dusk is a lost 1918 American silent drama film directed by James Young. It was produced by Sessue Hayakawa's Haworth Pictures Corporation.

== Plot ==
As described in a film magazine, Akira (Hayakawa), a Japanese poet who lives in Tokyo, falls in love with an American, Ruth Vale (Novak), who has grown to womanhood under his father's care. He is much saddened, however, when she marries an American. Three years elapse and Ruth dies of an illness, leaving a baby in the poet's care. Akira agrees to accompany the child and father to America, and when the American is accused of the murder of a man who entered his home, Akira assumes the guilt. He escapes from prison to visit the child and is shot by a guard. An allegorical scene shows Akira and Ruth entering the Temple of Dusk together.

== Cast ==
- Sessue Hayakawa as Akira
- Jane Novak as Ruth Vale
- Louis Willoughby as Edward Markham
- Mary Jane Irving as Blossom
- Sylvia Breamer as Adrienne Chester
- Henry A. Barrows as Pembroke Wilson (credited as Henry Barrows)

== Reception ==
Like many American films of the time, The Temple of Dusk was subject to cuts by city and state film censorship boards. For example, the Chicago Board of Censors required a cut, in Reel 3, of the scene with the wife at the mantle and her lover on the couch and the first kissing scene between wife and lover where Akira discovers them.

== Preservation ==
With no holdings located in archives, The Temple of Dusk is considered a lost film.
