= The Beggar Prince =

1920 film by William Worthington

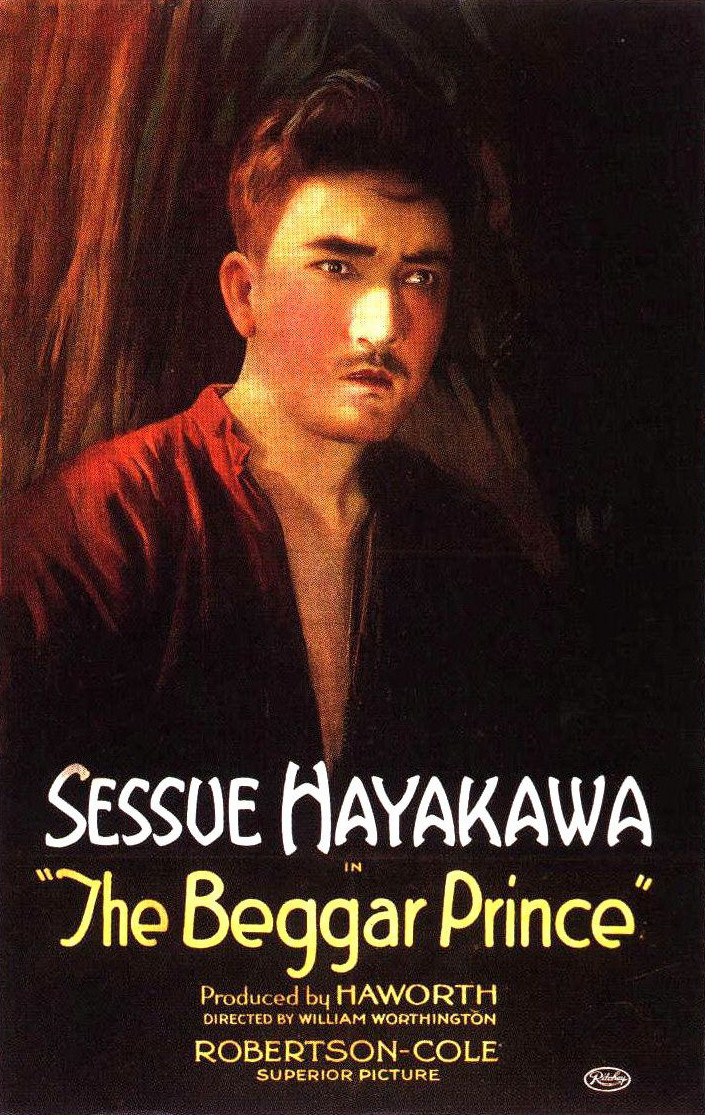
- Film Poster
- Directed by: William Worthington
- Written by: E. Richard Schayer(story & scenario)
- Starring: Sessue Hayakawa
- Cinematography: Frank D. Williams
- Production company: Haworth Productions
- Distributed by: Robertson-Cole Distributing Corporation
- Release date: January 25, 1920
- Running time: 50 minutes
- Country: USA
- Language: Silent...English intertitles

The Beggar Prince is a lost 1920 American silent drama film directed by William Worthington and produced by Sessue Hayakawa's Haworth Pictures Corporation.

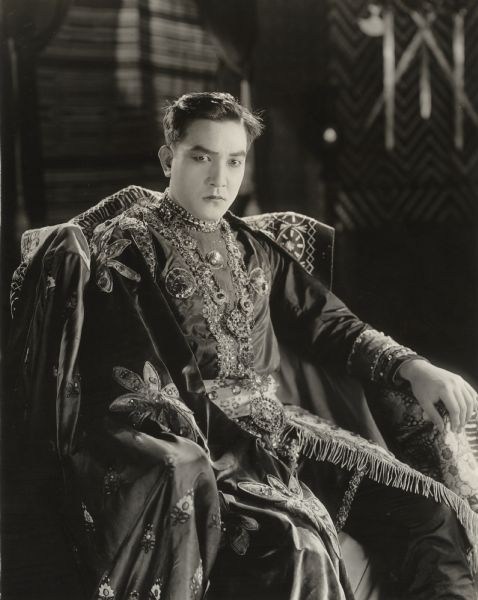
still from the production.

== Plot ==
An island is ruled by a prince who mistakenly believes he can control the moon and the sea. The prince tries to be with a beautiful girl who doesn't like him. A fisherman sees the prince harassing the girl and knocks him out, swaps clothes with him and takes over the role as leader of the country. After some time the fisherman feels guilty and returns the throne to the cast-out prince. The prince has found a peaceful way of life and both men marry the women they love.

== Cast ==
- Sessue Hayakawa as Nikki/Prince
- Beatrice La Plante as Olala
- Thelma Percy as Sosad
- Bert Hadley as Grand Vizier
- Robert Bolder as Bunko
- Josef Swickard as Nodo
- Charles A. Post as Court Murderer (*as Buddy Post)
