= His Birthright =

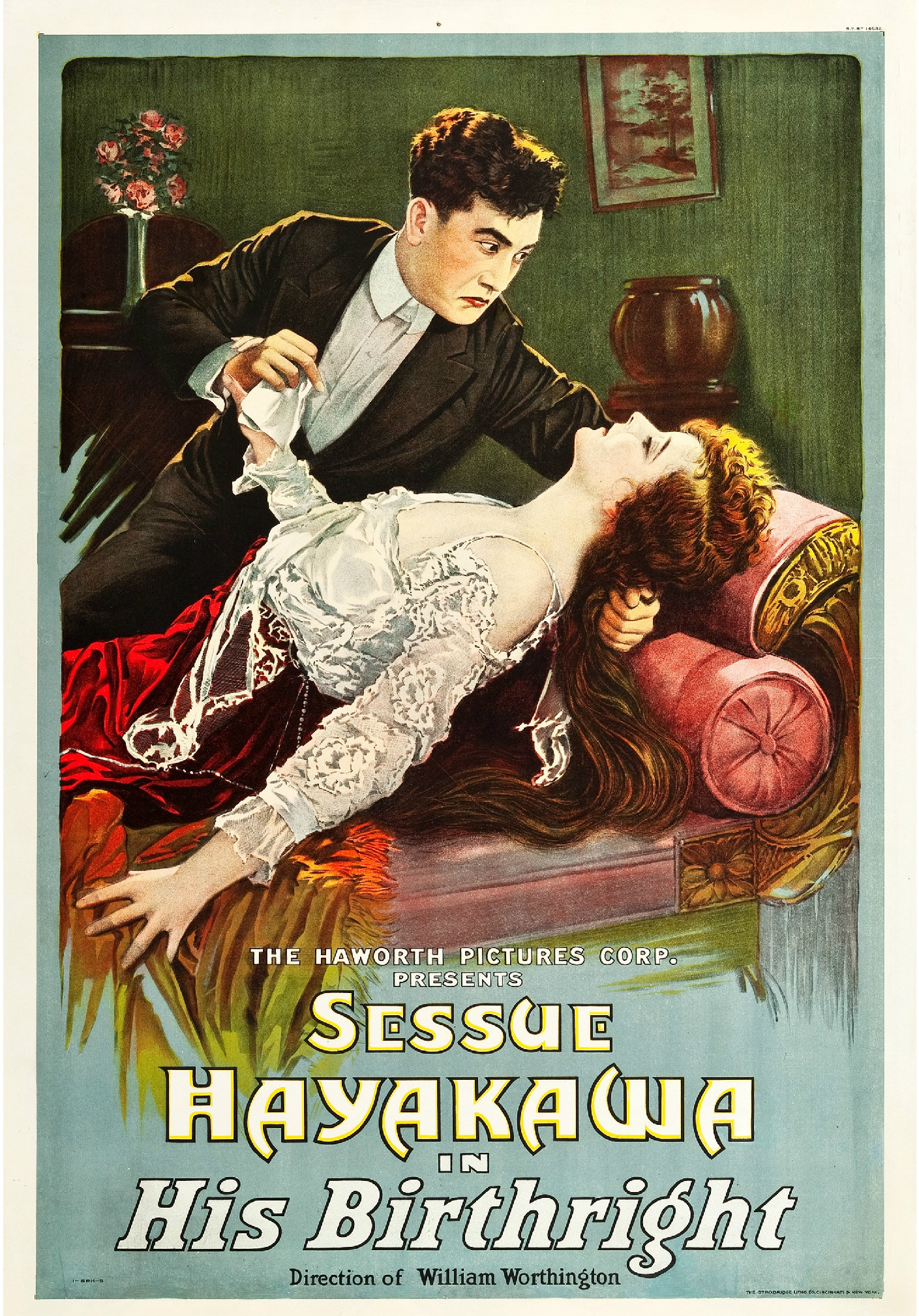
- Film poster.
- Directed by: William Worthington
- Story by: Sessue Hayakawa; Denison Clift
- Produced by: Sessue Hayakawa
- Starring: Sessue Hayakawa; Marin Sais; Howard Davies; Mary Anderson; Tsuru Aoki
- Cinematography: Robert Newhard
- Music by: Joseph O'Sullivan "Nipponese"
- Production company: Haworth Pictures Corporation
- Distributed by: Mutual Film
- Release date: September 8, 1918 (USA)
- Running time: 50 minutes
- Language: Silent (English intertitles)

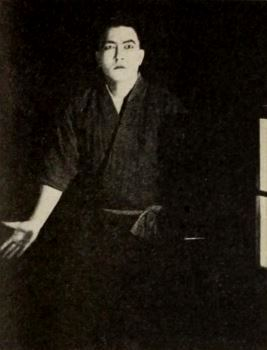
Still of Sessue Hayakawa as Yukio.

His Birthright is a 1918 American silent drama film directed by William Worthington for Haworth Pictures Corporation. Sessue Hayakawa produced the film and played the lead role. The rest of the cast includes Marin Sais, Howard Davies, Mary Anderson, and Hayakawa's wife Tsuru Aoki.

== Plot ==
As described in a film magazine, Yukio is a Japanese-American whose father, a naval officer, failed to return to his mother after the honeymoon. The mother commits harakiri and the son becomes determined to kill his father and goes to America. Influenced by a female German spy, Yukio steals an important document from his father, who is now an admiral. Rebuffed by the woman and ashamed to have sunk to the level of a thief, he then decides to recover the paper. He does so after a desperate battle with the woman's colleagues and returns the document to his father, who descends upon the place with police and captures the spies. Yukio announces that he came to take his father's life, but the admiral tells him that he loved Yukio's mother and did not return to her as he could not find her. Taking his place as the admiral's son, Yukio is now determined to join the U.S. army and fight in World War I, a cause in which Japan and America are united.

== Cast ==
- Sessue Hayakawa as Yukio
- Marin Sais as Edna Kingston
- Howard Davies as Adm. John Milton
- Mary Anderson as Helen Milton
- Tsuru Aoki as Saki San
- Sidney De Gray as James Barnes (credited as Sydney De Grey)
- Harry von Meter as Adm. von Krug
- Mayme Kelso as Mrs. Harland Smith

== Release ==
Soon after the New Orleans release of His Birthright, the film was seized by Naval Intelligence officers at the Palace on September 18th. A complaint was lodged by friends of Rear Admiral John B. Milton, stationed at New Orleans Navy Yard, who felt that the similar name of Howard Davies' character reflected poorly on the Rear Admiral.

== Reception ==
Variety's review was largely positive, praising the acting and settings, but found the plot element of Admiral John Milton having a love affair with a Japanese woman to be disagreeable. The reviewer said they would have preferred if the man was an ordinary American citizen who had to "bear the disgrace of being confronted with an illegitimate son."

== Preservation ==
Only 3 of the 5 reels of His Birthright are known to survive and they are held by the EYE Filmmuseum in the Netherlands.
