= The Brand of Lopez =

1920 film by Joe De Grasse

Easy to Get
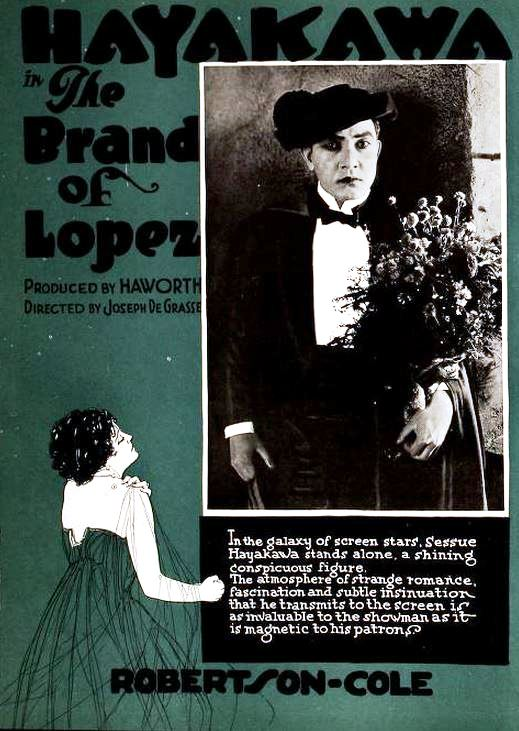
- Advertisement
- Directed by: Joseph De Grasse
- Written by: J. Grubb Alexander; Richard Schayer (story)
- Produced by: George W. Stout
- Starring: Sessue Hayakawa; Florence Turner
- Cinematography: Frank D. Williams
- Production company: Haworth Pictures Corporation
- Distributed by: Robertson-Cole Distributing Corporation
- Release date: April 1920
- Running time: 50 minutes; 5 reels
- Country: United States
- Language: Silent (English intertitles)

The Brand of Lopez is a 1920 American silent drama film directed by Joseph De Grasse and produced by Sessue Hayakawa's Haworth Pictures Corporation. Although the main characters are a matador and an actress, there are no bull fighting or theater scenes portrayed in the film.

== Plot ==
As described in a film magazine, matador Vasco Lopez is the idol of Spain. His engagement to actress Lola Castillo leads to complications when another man brings her home from the theater. Lopez brands her with his cigarette and stabs her escort, Captain Alvarez. He then escapes into the mountains and becomes a leader of a band of brigands. Lola obtains a divorce and marries Captain Alvarez. Lopez, seeking revenge, sends his men to abduct Lola, but they bring her younger sister Maria instead and Lopez rapes her. She returns to the town and dies a year later, leaving a baby which is exchanged by a nurse for a child of Lola's that dies at birth. Five years later, Lopez surrounds their home and takes Captain Alvarez and the child prisoner, and then orders them shot. He locks himself in a room with Lola. When the nurse confesses the truth of the child's paternity and the police are surrounding the villa, Lopez leaves and sacrifices himself by interjecting himself as the bandits are shooting at Alvarez and his son.

== Cast ==
- Sessue Hayakawa as Vasco Lopez
- Florence Turner as Lola Castillo
- Sidney Payne as Captain Alvarez
- Evelyn Ward as Maria Castillo
- Eugenie Besserer as Señora Castillo
- Gertrude Norman as Marianna
- Kitty Bradbury as Señora Lopez

== Censorship ==
Initially, The Brand of Lopez was rejected in its entirety by the Kansas Board of Review, but was reviewed again two months later, where it passed with cuts. The scene of girls brought before Lopez, and the intertitle "When this candle burns out, you will be the wife of Lopez" was removed. Reel 5 was altered significantly, adding the intertitle "Your wife is dying, will you not come to her?" and removing all titles and scenes related to deathbed marriage.
