= The House of Intrigue =

1919 film by Lloyd Ingraham

- Directed by: Lloyd Ingraham
- Written by: Arthur Stringer
- Screenplay by: Richard Schayer
- Starring: Mignon Anderson; Helene Sullivan; Peggy May
- Cinematography: Sam Landers
- Production company: Haworth Pictures Corporation
- Distributed by: Robertson-Cole Distributing Corporation; Exhibitors Mutual Distributing Company
- Release date: September 21, 1919 (USA)
- Language: English

The House of Intrigue is a 1919 American crime drama film directed by Lloyd Ingraham. It was produced by Haworth Pictures Corporation and based on a novel written by Arthur Stringer.
