= Shams of Society =

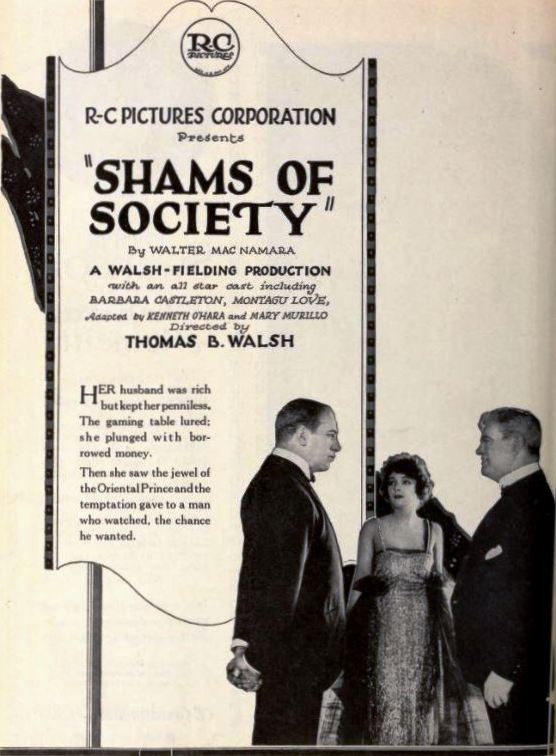
- Advertisement for the film
- Directed by: Thomas B. Walsh
- Written by: Mary Murillo; Kenneth O'Hara
- Based on: Shams of Society by Walter MacNamara
- Starring: Barbara Castleton; Montagu Love; Macey Harlam
- Cinematography: John S. Stumar; Charles Stumar
- Production company: Walsh-Fielding Productions
- Distributed by: R-C Pictures
- Release date: September 18, 1921
- Running time: 6 reels
- Country: United States
- Language: Silent (English intertitles)

Shams of Society is a 1921 American melodrama film. It was directed by Thomas B. Walsh. It was based on the story "Shams" by Walter McNamara and was adapted by Mary Murillo and Kenneth O'Hara.

The six-reel film was produced by Walsh-Fielding Productions and released by R-C Pictures.

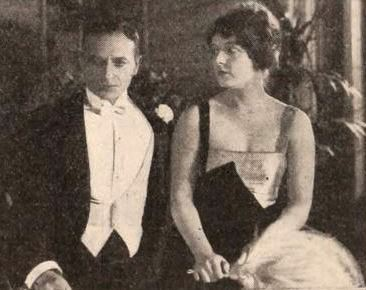

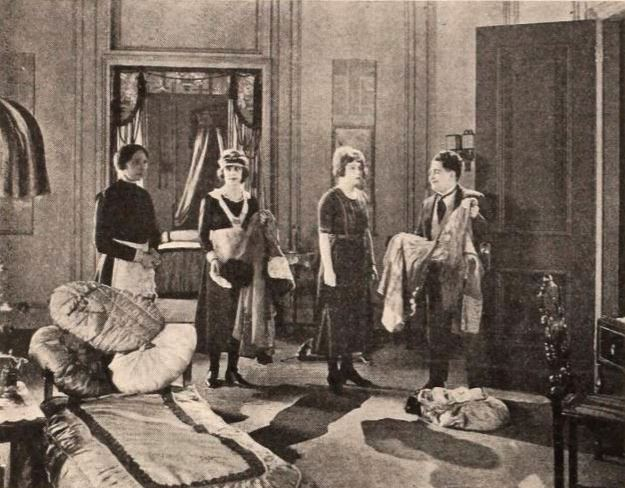

== Plot ==
Herbert Porter, although well-to-do, does not understand that his wife Helen is entitled to a money allowance. He freely opens accounts for her at all the fashionable stores, but she is short of ready cash, a fact which causes her considerable annoyance. With Mrs. Crest she visits a gambling resort run under the guise of a gown shop. Here she loses money and borrows from Mrs. Crest. She is obliged to pawn her jewels at a pawn shop kept by one Manning, known in society as Milton Howard. She has previously offended Howard, who is thus given a chance to revenge himself. Judge Harrington, a friend of Helen's, induces her to tell him her troubles. An Indian Prince loses a valuable gem at a reception. Howard knows who has taken it and instructs his employees to show to his private office the woman who tries to pawn it. Helen appears and Howard demands that she meet him that night. Porter, won by Harrington's argument, gives Helen a check for $5,000. She goes to keep her appointment with Howard. Porter, suspicious, follows. He is about to shoot Howard, when the latter calls in his mother and sisters and has Helen tell them of the troubles besetting women in the smart set. This cures them of aU desire to break into society. Husband and wife come to a perfect understanding and all ends well.

== Cast ==
- Barbara Castleton as Helen Porter
- Montagu Love as Hebert Porter
- Macey Harlam as Milton Howard
- Julia Swayne Gordon as Mrs. Crest
- Ann Brody as "Mama" Manning
- Gladys Feldman
- Sallie Tysha as Manning sister
- Lucille Lee Stewart as Lucille Lee
- Edward Davis as Judge Harrington
- Victor Gilbert as Reggie Frothingham

== See also ==
- List of American films of 1921
- List of Film Booking Offices of America films
