= The Illustrious Prince =

1919 film by William Worthington

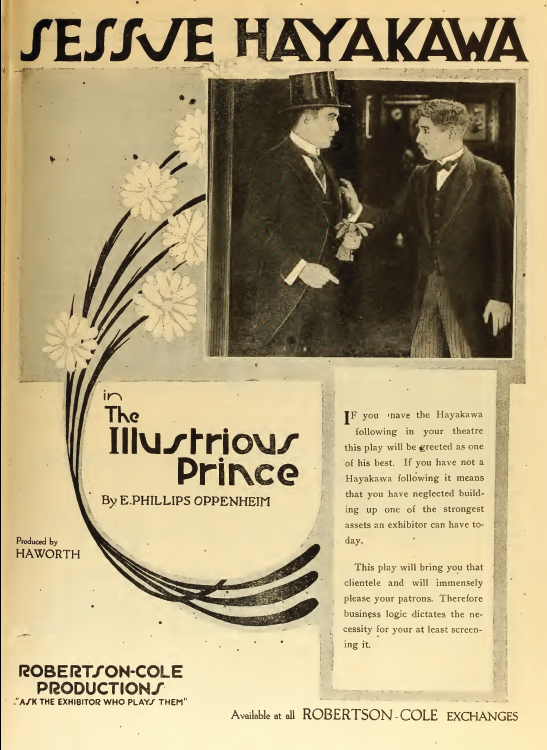
- Advertisement for film
- Directed by: William Worthington
- Screenplay by: Richard Schayer
- Based on: The Illustrious Prince by E. Phillips Oppenheim
- Starring: Sessue Hayakawa; Mabel Ballin; Harry Lonsdale
- Cinematography: Frank D. Williams
- Production company: Haworth Pictures Corporation
- Distributed by: Robertson-Cole Distributing Corporation
- Release date: November 2, 1919
- Running time: 50 min.
- Country: United States
- Language: Silent (English intertitles)

The Illustrious Prince is a 1919 American silent drama film directed by William Worthington and produced by Sessue Hayakawa's Haworth Pictures Corporation.

== Cast ==
- Sessue Hayakawa as Prince Maiyo (and the Prince's father)
- Mabel Ballin as Penelope Morse
- Harry Lonsdale as the Duke of Devenham
- Beverly Traverse as the Duchess
- Robert Lawler as Sir Charles Somerfield
- Bertram Grassby as Count de la Mar
- Toyo Fujita as Soto
- Edward Peil as Inspector Jacks
