= His Debt =

1919 film by William Worthington

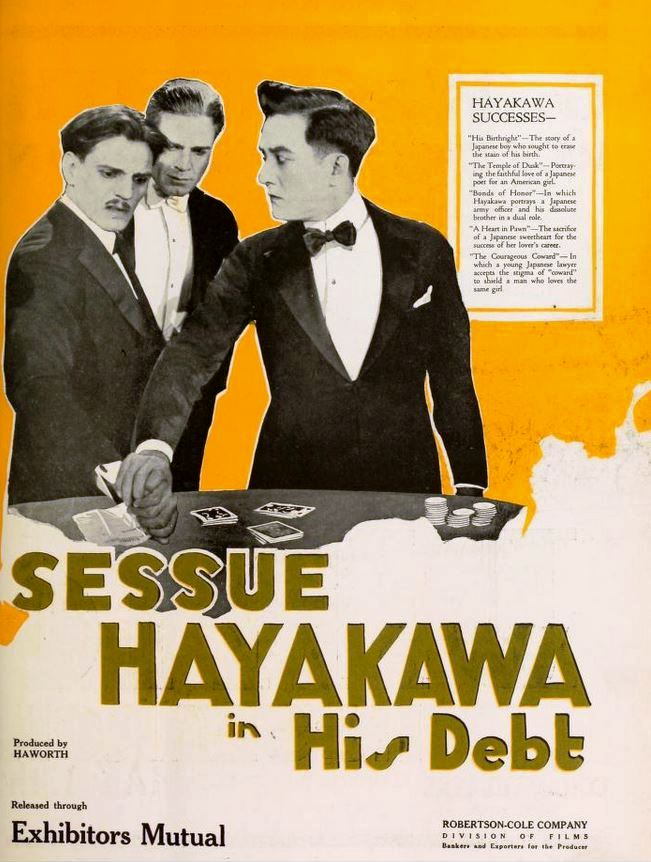
- Advertisement for film
- Directed by: William Worthington
- Story by: L. V. Jefferson
- Starring: Sessue Hayakawa; Jane Novak; Francis McDonald; Fred Montague
- Cinematography: Frank D. Williams
- Production company: Haworth Pictures Corporation
- Distributed by: Robertson-Cole
- Release date: May 25, 1919 (USA)
- Running time: 50 min.
- Country: United States
- Language: Silent (English intertitles)

His Debt is a 1919 American silent drama film directed by William Worthington and produced by Haworth Pictures Corporation.

== Plot ==
As described in a film magazine, Goto Mariyama, Japanese owner of a fashionable gambling house, accepts the worthless check of Blair Whitcomb, who has lost his fortune at the gaming table. Whitcomb makes an attempt on Mariyama's life. Gloria Manning, Whitcomb's fiance, is a nurse and saves Mariyama's life. He is about to propose marriage when he learns of her engagement. Much as he loves her, he still is determined to have his revenge upon Whitcomb. When the police come to take Whitcomb prisoner, so earnestly does Gloria plead for her sweetheart, even after she learns of his guilt, that Mariyama relents.

== Cast ==
- Sessue Hayakawa as Goto Mariyama
- Jane Novak as Gloria Manning
- Francis McDonald as Blair Whitcomb
- Fred Montague as J.P. Manning

== Preservation ==
With no holdings located in archives, His Debt is considered a lost film.
