= A Heart in Pawn =

1919 film by William Worthington

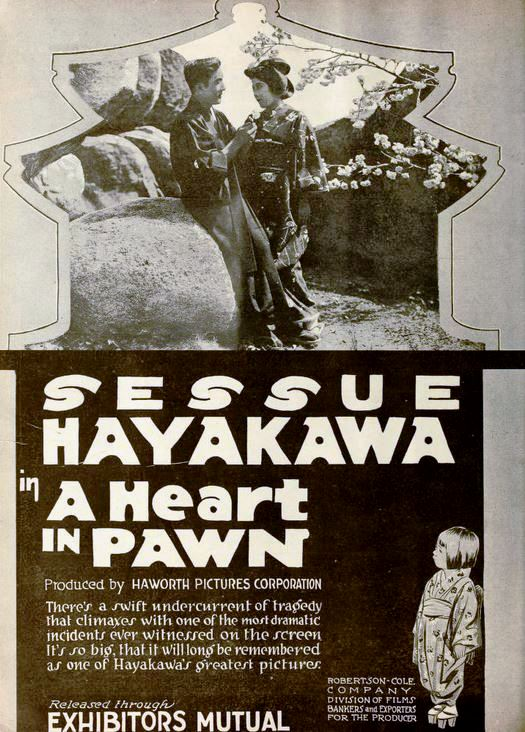
- An advertisement for the film
- Directed by: William Worthington
- Written by: Frances Guihan (scenario); Thomas J. Geraghty (scenario)
- Starring: Sessue Hayakawa; Vola Vale; Tsuru Aoki
- Cinematography: Dal Clawson
- Production company: Haworth Pictures Corporation
- Distributed by: Robertson-Cole
- Release date: March 20, 1919 (USA)
- Running time: 50 min.
- Language: Silent (English intertitles)

A Heart in Pawn is a 1919 American silent drama film directed by William Worthington. Sessue Hayakawa's Haworth Pictures Corporation produced the film and Worthington played the lead role along with Vola Vale and his wife Tsuru Aoki.

The film included sequences filmed at the Japanese Tea Garden in Golden Gate Park.

== Cast ==
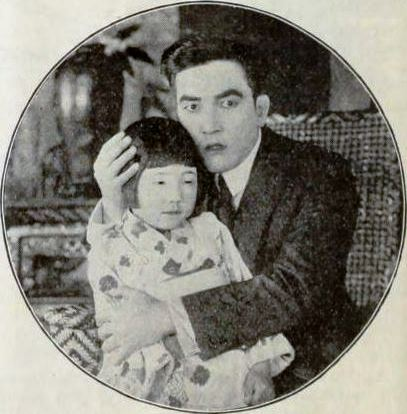
Sessue Hayakawa and child actor

- Sessue Hayakawa as Tomaya
- Vola Vale as Emily Stone
- Tsuru Aoki as Sada
- Florence Vidor as Dr. Stone's daughter

== Preservation ==
With no prints of A Heart in Pawn located in any film archives, it is considered a lost film.
