= The First Born (1921 film) =

1921 film

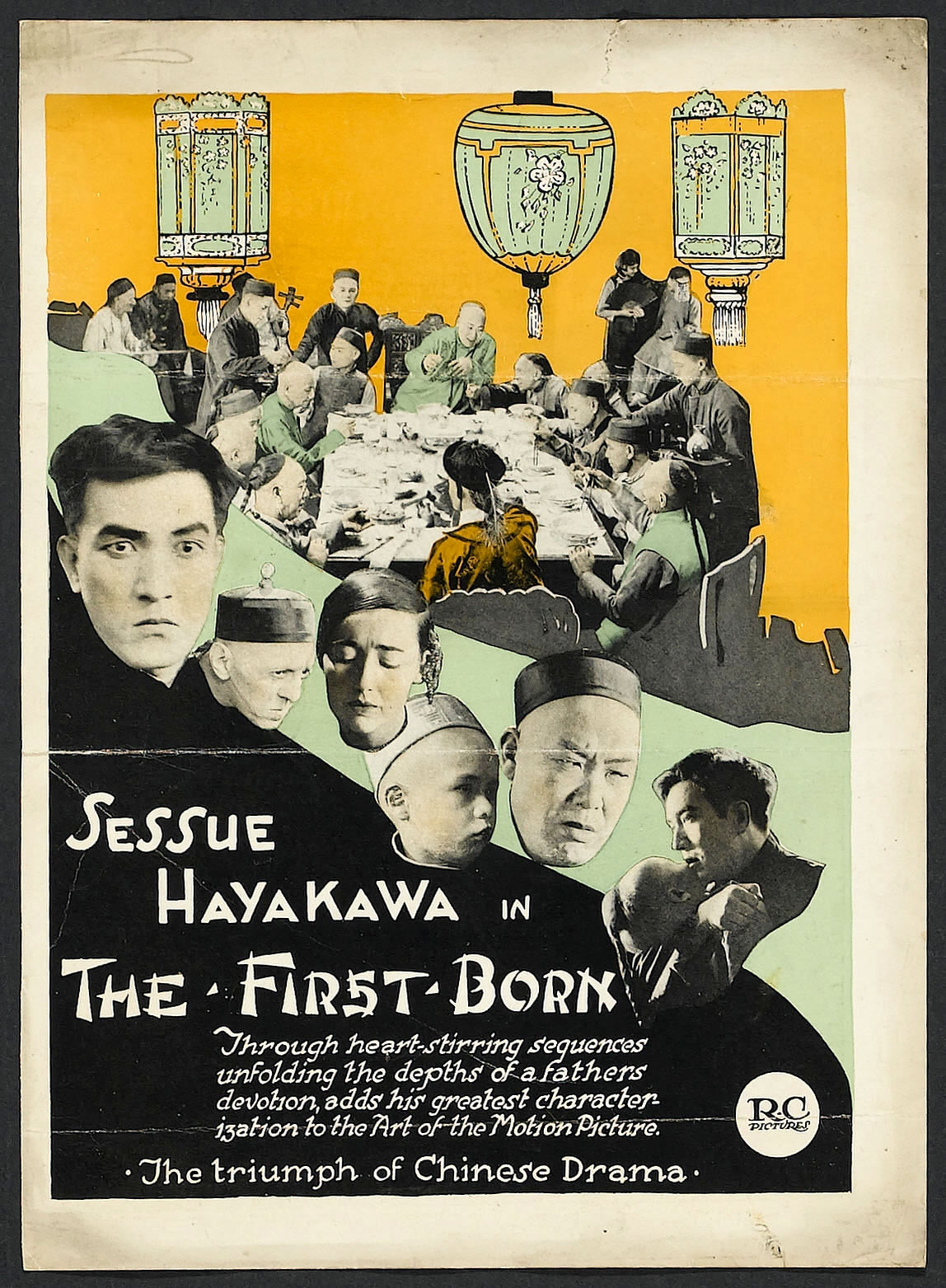
- Lobby poster
- Directed by: Colin Campbell
- Written by: Frederick Stowers
- Produced by: Sessue Hayakawa
- Starring: Sessue Hayakawa; Helen Jerome Eddy
- Cinematography: Frank D. Williams
- Distributed by: Robertson-Cole (*aka FBO)
- Release date: January 30, 1921
- Running time: 5-6 reels
- Country: United States
- Language: Silent (English intertitles)

The First Born is a 1921 American silent romantic drama film directed by Colin Campbell and produced by and starring Sessue Hayakawa. It was distributed by the Robertson-Cole Company.

== Cast ==
- Sessue Hayakawa as Chan Wang
- Helen Jerome Eddy as Loey Tsing
- Sonny Loy as Chan Toy (credited as "Sonny Boy" Warde)
- Goro Kino as Man Low Tek
- Marie Pavis as Chan Lee
- Frank M. Seki as Hop Lee
- Wilson Hummel as Kuey Lar
- Anna May Wong

== Preservation status ==
The film is preserved at the BFI National Archive.
