= The Man Beneath =

1919 film by William Worthington

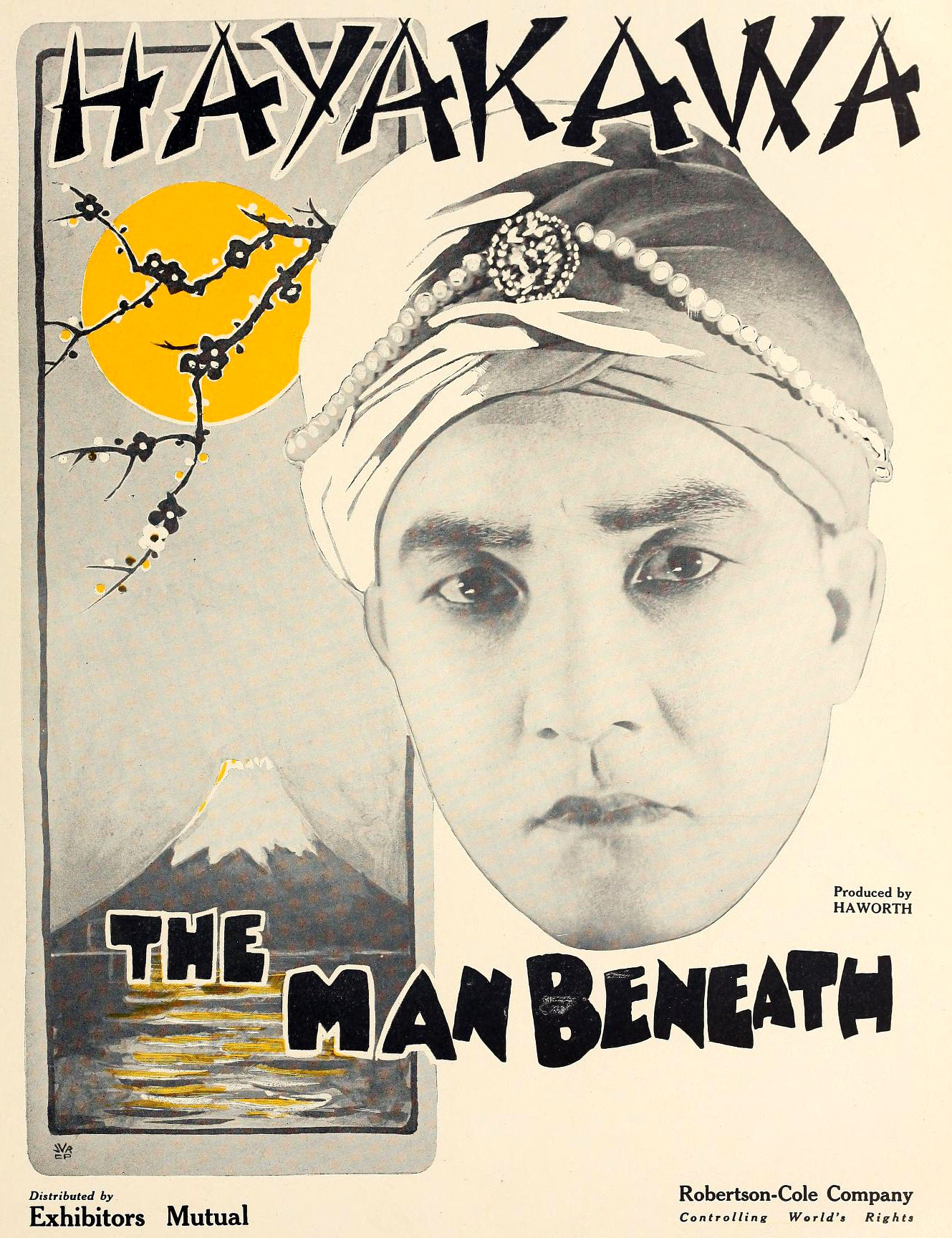
- Advertisement
- Directed by: William Worthington
- Based on: Only a Nigger by Edmund Mitchell
- Produced by: Sessue Hayakawa
- Starring: Sessue Hayakawa; Helen Jerome Eddy; Pauline Curley; John Gilbert
- Cinematography: Frank D. Williams
- Production company: Haworth Pictures Corporation
- Distributed by: Exhibitors Mutual; Robertson-Cole Distributing Corporation
- Release date: July 6, 1919 (USA)
- Running time: 50 minutes
- Country: United States
- Language: Silent (English intertitles)

The Man Beneath is a 1919 American silent crime drama film directed by William Worthington and produced by Sessue Hayakawa's Haworth Pictures Corporation. A complete copy of the film is in the collection of the EYE Film Institute Netherlands.

== Plot ==
As described in a film magazine, Kate Erskine and her sister Mary love Dr. Chindi Ashutor and James Bassett, respectively, the latter having been college chums, one being a noted physician while the other pursuing no occupation as yet. Mary and Bassett become engaged while Dr. Ashutor goes to aid his countrymen in plague-stricken India. While he is away Bassett receives a summons from the Black Hand, an order he joined in his youth for adventure. Feeling his life in danger, he goes to Dr. Ashutor in India and with his aid almost succeeds in establishing his feigned death as a reality. However, the spies of the order follow them to Scotland and to the home of the Erskines. Here Dr. Ashutor is instrumental in finally ridding Bassett from the menace of the order. Mary and Bassett then marry, while the situation of Kate and Dr. Ashutor remains undecided.

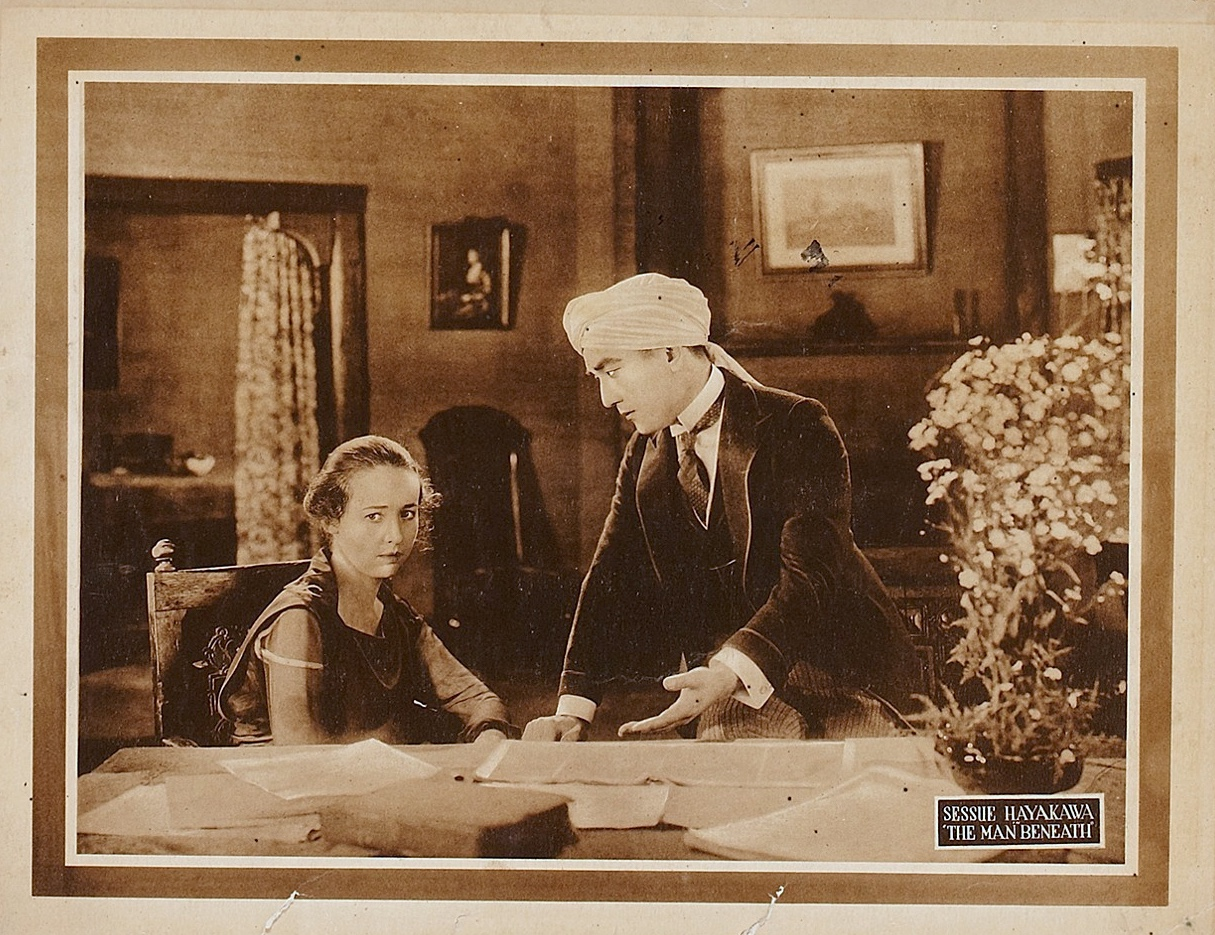
The Man Beneath Lobbycard

== Cast ==
- Sessue Hayakawa as Dr. Chindi Ashutor
- Helen Jerome Eddy as Kate Erskine
- Pauline Curley as Mary Erskine
- John Gilbert as James Bassett (credited as Jack Gilbert)
- Fontaine La Rue as Countess Petite Florence
- Wedgwood Nowell as François
- Fanny Midgley (uncredited)

== Reception ==
Variety's review was mixed, praising the acting but criticized the editing and intertitles for being confusing.

Moving Picture World's review by Margaret I. MacDonald was positive, calling the film "thrillingly adventurous" and "dramatically romantic."
