= The Devil's Claim =

1920 film by Charles Swickard

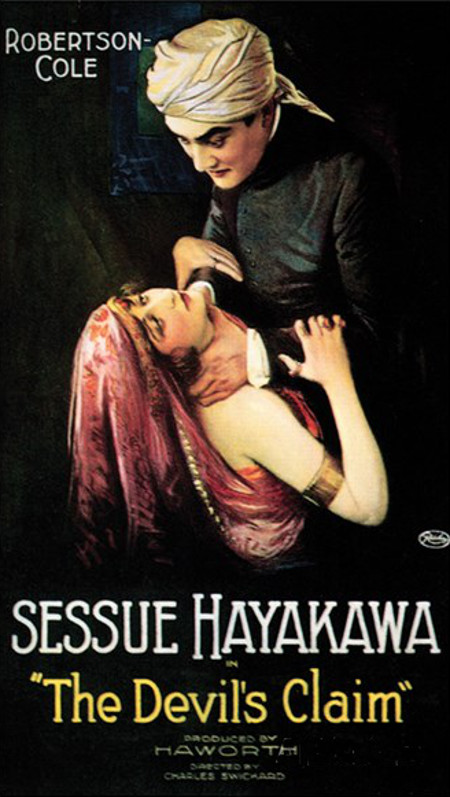
- Theatrical release poster
- Directed by: Charles Swickard
- Written by: J. Grubb Alexander (screenplay and story)
- Produced by: George W. Stout
- Starring: Sessue Hayakawa; Colleen Moore; Rhea Mitchell
- Cinematography: Frank D. Williams
- Production company: Haworth Pictures Corporation
- Distributed by: Robertson-Cole Distributing Corporation
- Release date: May 2, 1920
- Country: United States
- Language: Silent (English intertitles)

The Devil's Claim is a 1920 American silent drama film starring Sessue Hayakawa and Colleen Moore. A print of this film survives.

== Plot ==
As summarized in a film publication, Akbar Khan, a novelist in New York, uses his love affairs as inspiration for his books. His current affair is with Indora, a Persian girl. However, the passion has left the relationship and he casts her out. Social worker Virginia Crosby comes to her aid and pretends to fall for Khan. He is inspired to write about "The Devil’s Trademark" (this was the working title of the film), an adaption of a serial for a popular magazine. The film flashes to his vision of the story, which is set in Paris with Khan as the hero Hassan. Hassan's companion in the story is a beautiful Hindu woman. The story includes a stolen talisman, a blindfolded marriage, Egyptian sorceresses, a sect of devil worshipers, and reincarnated evil spirits. Virginia then leaves Khan before the story is finished, and sends for Indora, who steps into her place.

== Cast ==
- Sessue Hayakawa as Akbar Khan/Hassan
- Rhea Mitchell as Virginia Crosby
- Colleen Moore as Indora
- William Buckley as Spencer Wellington
- Sidney Payne as Kemal
- Joe Wray as Salim

== Bibliography ==
- Jeff Codori (2012), Colleen Moore; A Biography of the Silent Film Star, McFarland Publishing, (Print ISBN 978-0-7864-4969-9, EBook ISBN 978-0-7864-8899-5).
