= The Greater Profit =

1921 film

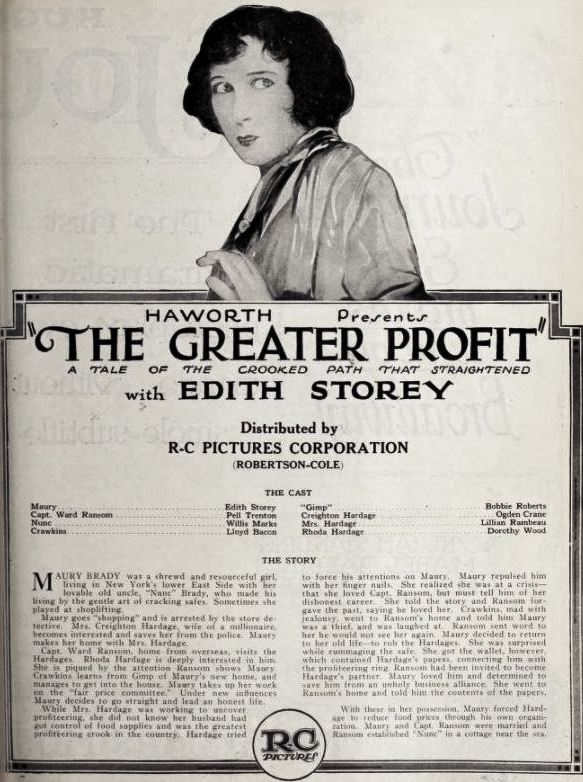
- Directed by: William Worthington
- Written by: Clifford Howard; Burke Jenkins; Bennett Cohen(& story contributor)
- Produced by: Haworth
- Starring: Edith Storey
- Cinematography: Edward Gheller
- Distributed by: Robertson-Cole Distribution
- Release date: June 4, 1921
- Country: United States
- Languages: Silent; English titles

The Greater Profit is a 1921 American lost silent crime film directed by William Worthington and starring Edith Storey.

== Cast ==
- Edith Storey as Maury Brady
- Pell Trenton as Captain Ward Ransom
- Willis Marks as 'Nunc' Brady
- Lloyd Bacon as Jim Crawkins
- Bobbie Roberts as 'Gimp' the Hunchback
- Ogden Crane as Creighton Hardage
- Lillian Rambeau as Mrs. Creighton Hardage
- Dorothy Wood as Rhoda Hardage
