= Banzai (1918 film) =

1918 film

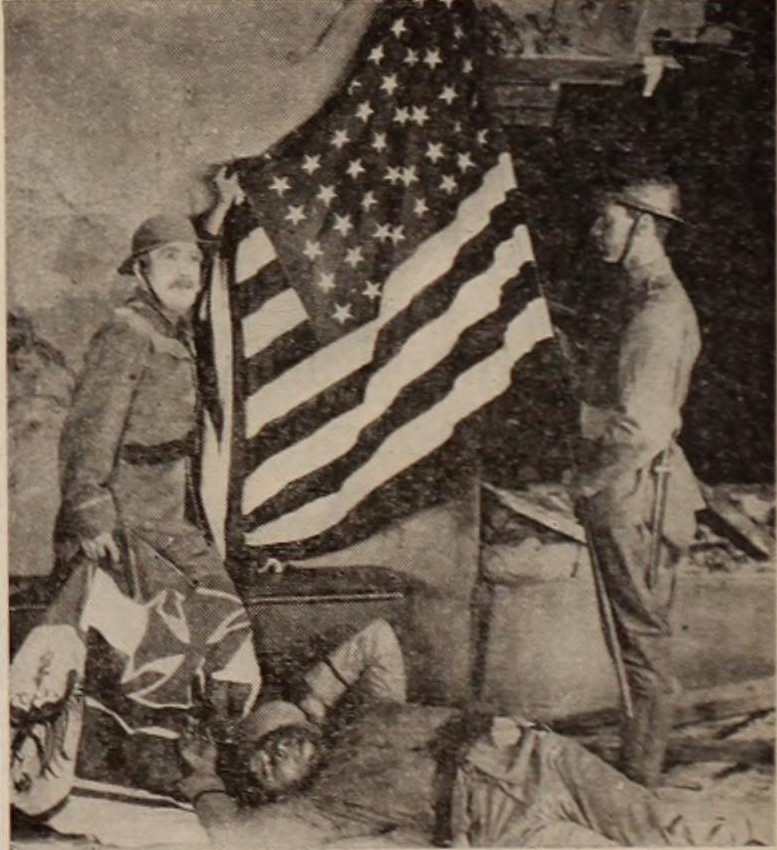
- Starring: Sessue Hayakawa
- Production company: Haworth Pictures Corporation
- Distributed by: Mutual Film
- Release date: October 1918
- Running time: 10 min.
- Country: USA
- Language: English

Banzai is a 1918 American silent short propaganda film starring Sessue Hayakawa and produced by his Haworth Pictures Corporation. The film was produced as an effort to support the fourth U.S. Liberty Bond drive, where many film stars were enlisted to create propaganda films.

== Plot ==
According to a film magazine, "Huns carousing at headquarters refer to America's war plans as a joke, and state that after Paris, New York will fall. American troops suddenly appear and wipe out the Huns. The American general discovers his men are without ammunition. An orderly announces that the Fourth Liberty Loan drive is on, and the general shouts "This means victory and the end of the war." The camera is moved showing the action has taken place on a stage. The General advances for a curtain call and presents a liberty loan plea, and shouts "Banzai" (hurrah)."
