= Bonds of Honor =

1919 American silent film directed by William Worthington

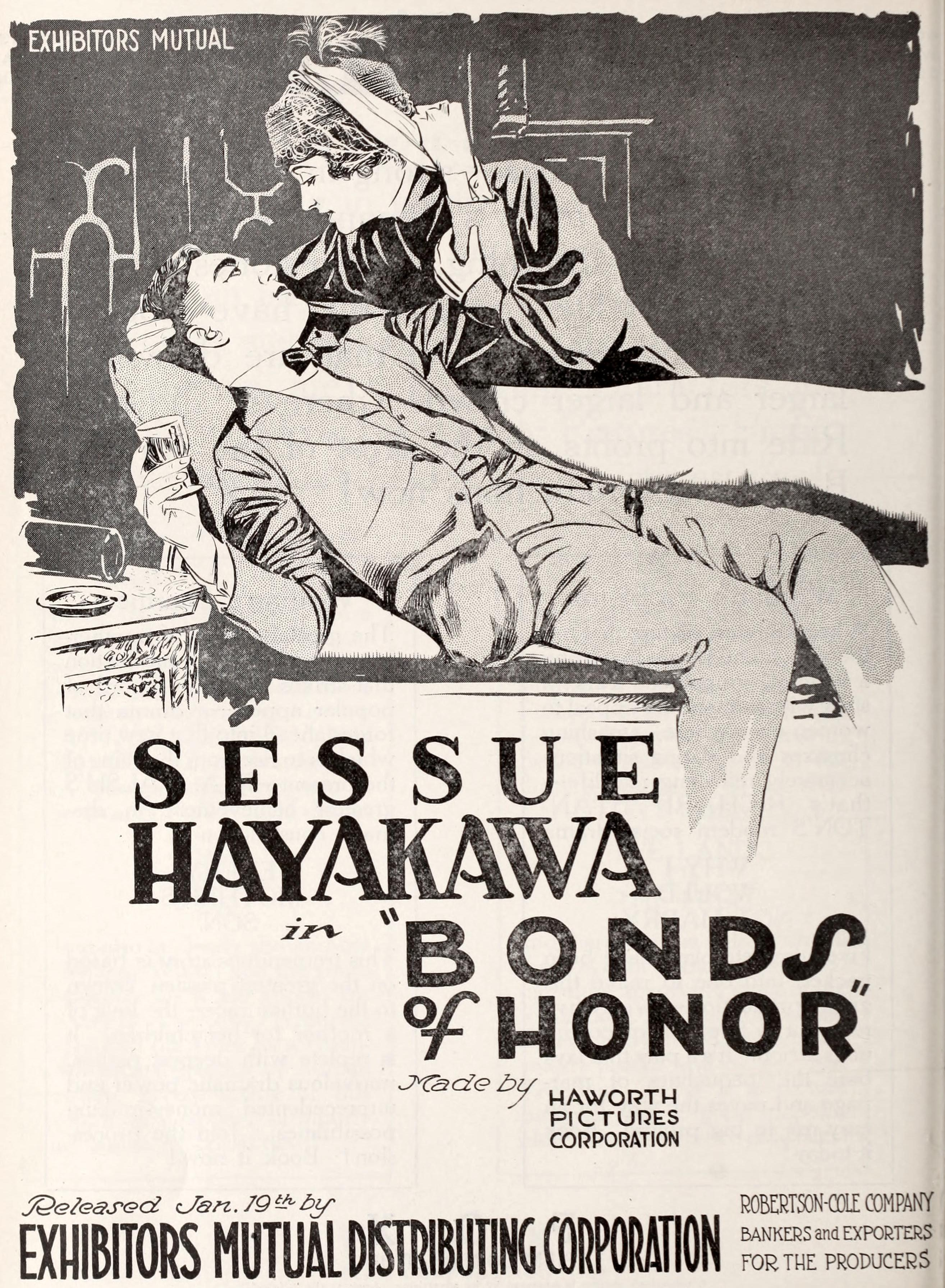
- Contemporary advertisement
- Directed by: William Worthington
- Written by: Frances Guihan
- Story by: Clara Whipple
- Starring: Sessue Hayakawa; Tsuru Aoki; Marin Sais; Dagmar Godowsky; Herschel Mayall; Toyo Fujita; M. Foshida
- Cinematography: Dal Clawson
- Edited by: Mildred Johnston
- Production company: Haworth Pictures Corporation
- Distributed by: Robertson-Cole Distributing Corporation; Exhibitors Mutual Distributing Company; Phocea Film (France)
- Release dates: October 4, 1919 (USA); 1921, France
- Running time: 5 reels
- Language: Silent (English intertitles)

Bonds of Honor is a 1919 American silent drama film directed by William Worthington. Sessue Hayakawa's Haworth Pictures Corporation produced the film and he himself played the leading roles along with his wife Tsuru Aoki. Marin Sais, Dagmar Godowsky, Herschel Mayall, Toyo Fujita and M. Foshida also appeared in the film.

== Plot ==
Sessue Hayakawa as Yamashito commits treason in WWI to pay off debts from gambling, and his brother Sasamoto also played by Hayakawa assumes his identity to restore the family honor and track him down.

== Cast ==
- Sessue Hayakawa as Yamashito / Sasamoto
- Marin Sais as Olga Orczy
- Tsuru Aoki as Toku-ko
- Dagmar Godowsky as Elva Petrovitch
- Herschel Mayall as Paul Berkowitz
- Toyo Fujita as Count Sakurai
- M. Foshida as Baron Saito

== Preservation ==
An abridged version of Bonds of Honor is held by the BFI in London.
