= The Gray Horizon =

1919 film by William Worthington

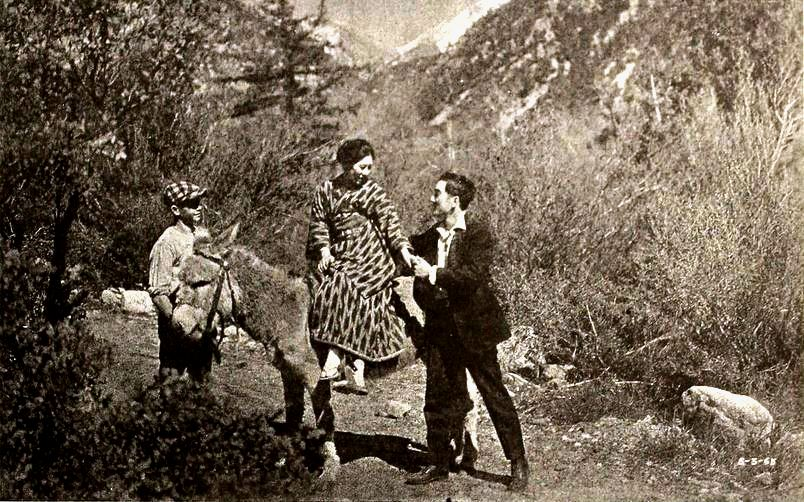
- Still from the film
- Directed by: William Worthington
- Starring: Sessue Hayakawa; Bertram Grassby; Eileen Percy; Tsuru Aoki; Mary Jane Irving; Andrew Robson
- Cinematography: Frank D. Williams
- Production company: Haworth Pictures Corporation
- Distributed by: Robertson-Cole
- Release date: August 18, 1919 (USA)
- Running time: 50 min.
- Language: Silent (English intertitles)

The Gray Horizon is a 1919 American silent drama film directed by William Worthington. Sessue Hayakawa's Haworth Pictures Corporation produced the film and he himself played the lead role. Bertram Grassby, Tsuru Aoki, Eileen Percy, Mary Jane Irving, and Andrew Robson also featured in the film.

The film includes sequences shot on location in the Sierra Nevada Mountains in California.

== Plot ==
As described in a film magazine, the skill of colorful Japanese artist Yamo Masata, who lives in the hills of California, attracts the attention of a clever counterfeiter who seeks the artist's aid in the preparation of spurious bonds. At first deceived, the artist becomes indignant when he learns the truth of the enterprise, and shows the man the door. The artist's sister, O Haru San, who is newly arrived in America and is searching for the American husband who deserted her, identifies the stranger as her spouse. He seeks to escape but in the encounter that follows both the counterfeiter and the sister meet death. In time, the artist is taken up by society and becomes wealthy and famous. Then he discovers that his chief patroness Doris Furthman, a lady he has come to love, is the bigamous widow of the man the artist murdered. The lady's brother accuses the artist of evil designs and learns the truth about the murder. When the artist demands proof regarding the accusation, he discovers that the evidence will blast the life of the woman he has come to love, so the artist destroys the evidence and prepares to go to trial.

== Cast ==
- Sessue Hayakawa as Yamo Masata
- Bertram Grassby as John Furthman
- Eileen Percy as Doris Furthman
- Tsuru Aoki as O Haru San
- Mary Jane Irving as Kenneth Furthman
- Andrew Robson as Robert Marsh

== Preservation ==
With no prints of The Gray Horizon located in any film archives, it is considered a lost film.
