= An Arabian Knight =

1920 film by Charles Swickard

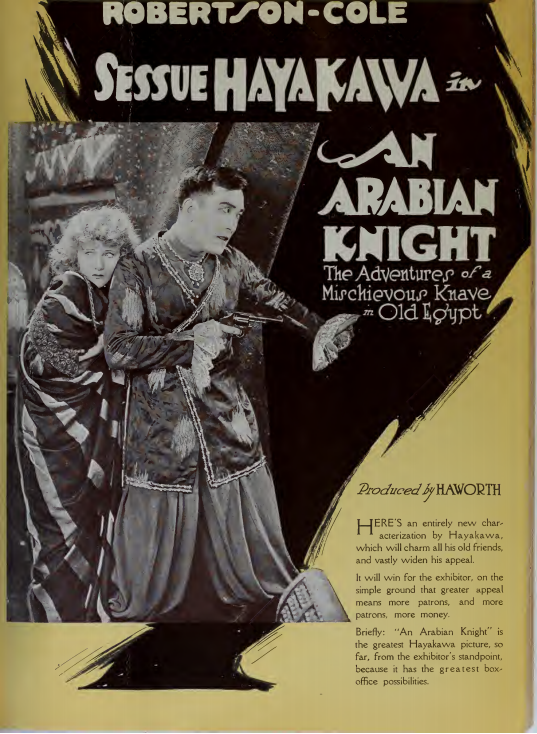
- Advertisement
- Directed by: Charles Swickard
- Written by: Richard Schayer (scenario)
- Story by: Gene Wright (story)
- Starring: Sessue Hayakawa; Lillian Hall; Jean Acker
- Cinematography: Frank D. Williams
- Production company: Haworth Pictures Corporation
- Distributed by: Robertson-Cole Distributing Corporation
- Release date: August 22, 1920
- Running time: 5 reels
- Country: United States
- Language: Silent (English intertitles)

An Arabian Knight is a 1920 American drama film directed by Charles Swickard and produced by Sessue Hayakawa's Haworth Pictures Corporation. Its survival status is classified as unknown, which suggests that it is a lost film. Nevertheless, the Library of Congress lists this as being in their collection.

== Plot ==
As described in a film magazine, Cordelia Darwin, spinster sister of Egyptologist George Darwin who resides in the desert, is a believer in reincarnation. Certain that she lived two thousand years ago as the Princess Rhodolphis and that youthful dragoman Ahmed is the reincarnation of her lost lover, she installs him in her home as a butler. Elinor Wayne, ward of the Darwins, becomes the prey of Egyptian nobleman Aboul Pasha. His determination to win her results in her abduction by rascals who take her to the home of the dancer Soada. Ahmed follows and rescues Elinor. When murderers hired by Pasha burn down the Darwin home, Ahmed aids the Darwins and Elinor in escaping. Elinor and George are reunited as sweethearts, while Ahmed finds his soul mate in Zorah.

== Cast ==
- Sessue Hayakawa as Ahmed
- Lillian Hall as Elinor Wayne
- Jean Acker as Zorah
- Yvonne Pavis as Soada (credited as Marie Pavis)
- Elaine Inescourt as Cordelia Darwin
- Harvey Clark as George Darwin (credited as Harvey Clarke)
- Fred C. Jones as Aboul Pasha (credited as Fred Jones)
- Roy Coulson as Wassef
- Tom Bates as Bedr
