= The Tong Man =

1919 film by William Worthington

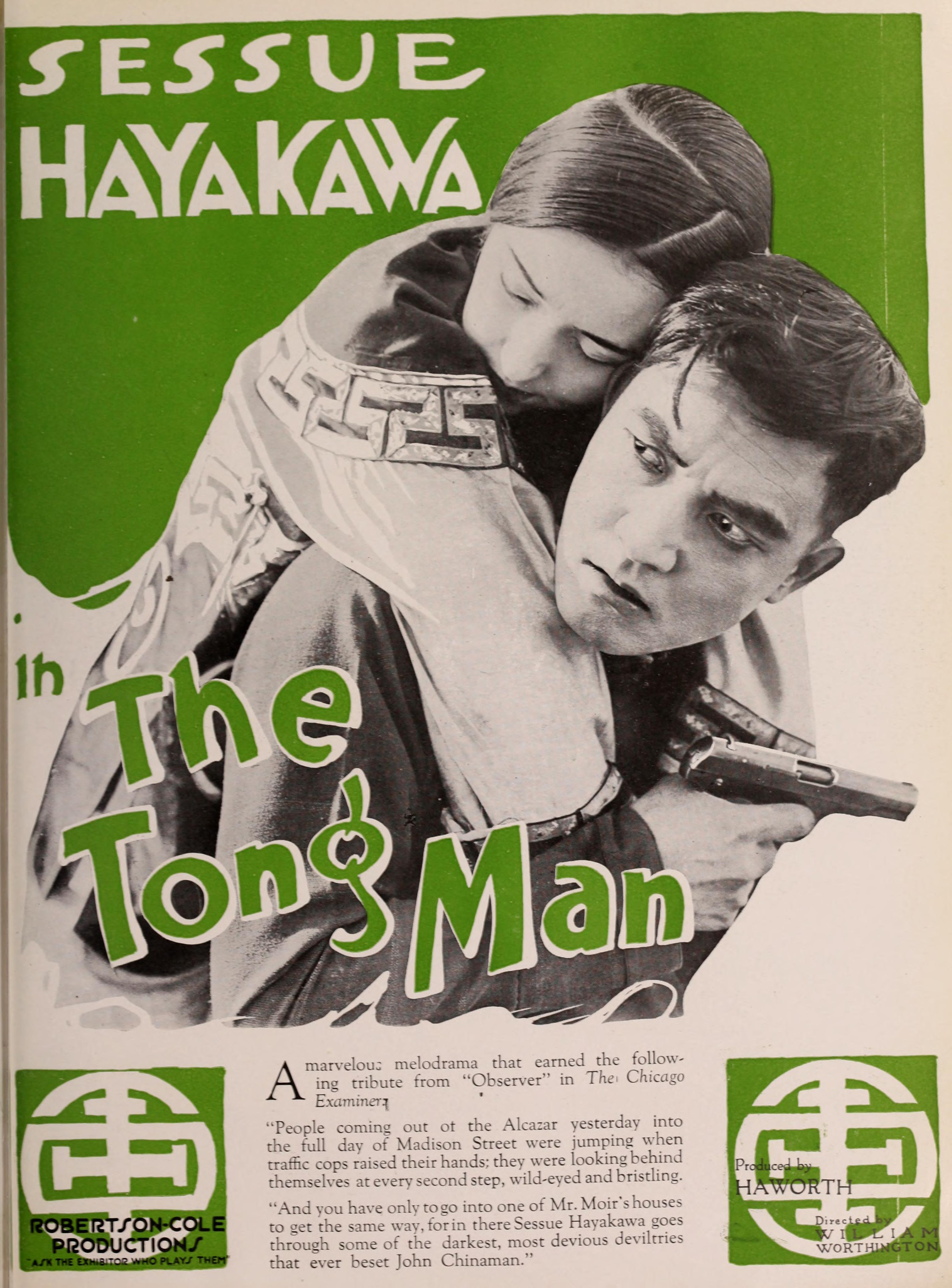
- Advertisement
- Directed by: William Worthington
- Written by: Richard Schayer (scenario)
- Based on: The Dragon’s Daughter by Clyde Westover
- Produced by: George W. Stout
- Starring: Sessue Hayakawa
- Cinematography: Frank D. Williams
- Production company: Haworth Pictures Corporation
- Distributed by: Robertson-Cole Distributing Corporation
- Release date: December 14, 1919
- Running time: 5 reels
- Country: United States
- Language: Silent (English intertitles)

The Tong Man

The Tong Man is a 1919 American silent crime thriller film directed by William Worthington and produced by Haworth Pictures Corporation.

The Tong Man survives and is available on home video. The film has long been preserved by the Library of Congress.

== Plot ==
As described in a film magazine, Luk Chen, whose heart beats for Sen Chee and for her alone, is commissioned by the tong of which he is a member to murder her father for failure to deliver her to Ming Tai, a power in San Francisco's Chinatown. His love proves stronger than his sense of duty and he fails to execute the command, so Ming Tai performs the duty in his stead. Ming Tai then abducts Sen Chee. Luk Chen affects a rescue and they conceal themselves in a dungeon belonging to Ming Tai. Their enemy discovers them and for a time it seems their end is only seconds away. They are then rescued and make their way by boat to China.

== Cast ==
- Sessue Hayakawa as Luk Chen
- Helen Jerome Eddy as Sen Chee
- Marc Roberts as Ming Tai
- Toyo Fujita as Louie Toy
- Yutaka Abe as Lucero (credited as Jack Yutaka Abbe)

== Censorship ==
The Tong Man was booked at the Victoria Theatre in Rochester, New York, but was unable to be exhibited due to an appeal by the Chinese Consul-General with the support of Chinese residents.

Before The Tong Man could be exhibited in Kansas, the Kansas Board of Review required the elimination of the scene where Ming embraces Sen Chee and the scene where a man is hit in the face with a hatchet.
