= William Worthington (actor) =

American actor (1872–1941)

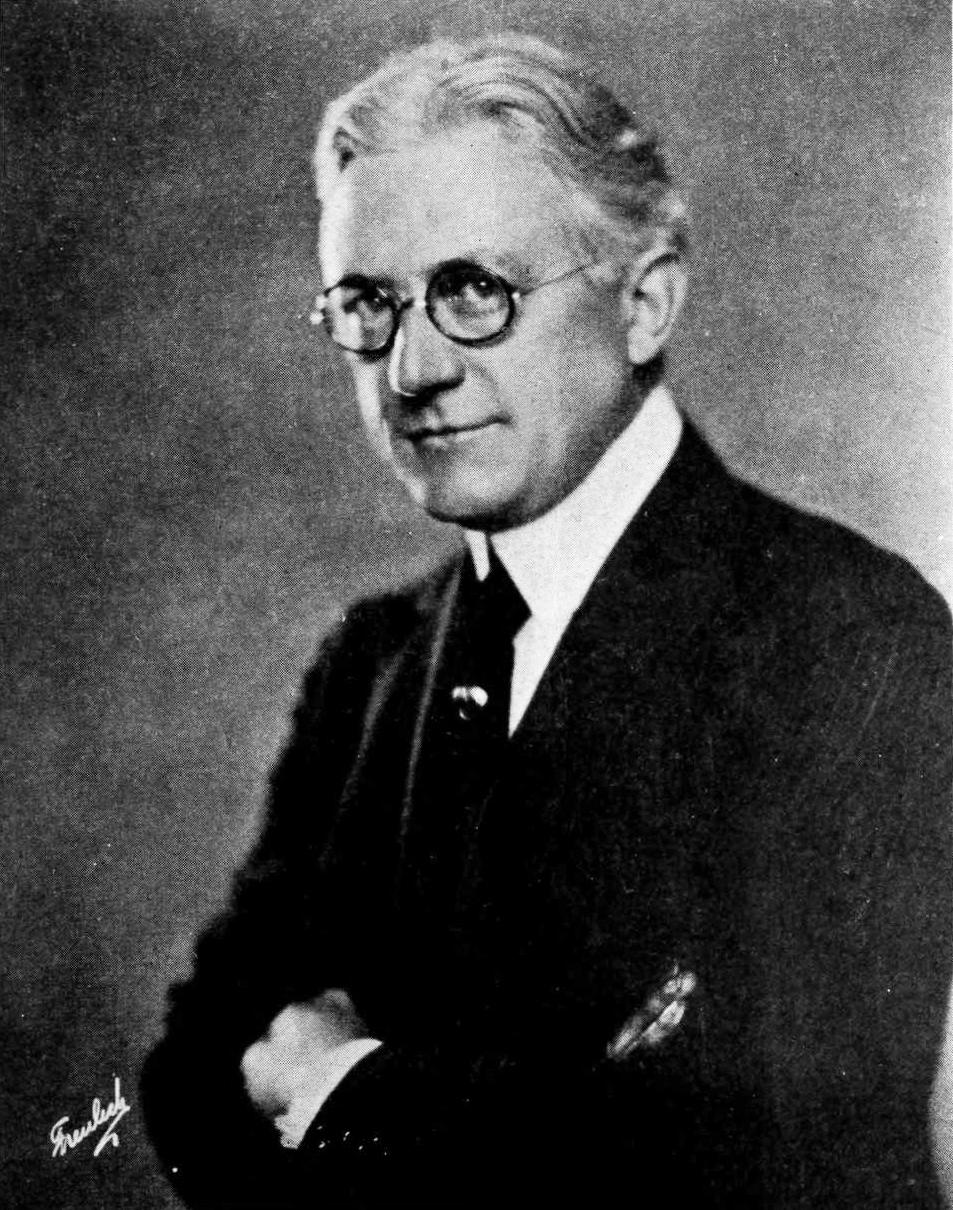
- Portrait of Worthington by photographer Roman Freulich, 1922
- Born: April 8, 1872; Troy, New York, U.S.
- Died: April 9, 1941 (aged 69); Beverly Hills, California, U.S.
- Occupations: Silent film actor and director

William Worthington (April 8, 1872 in Troy, New York – April 9, 1941 in Beverly Hills, California) was an American silent film actor and director.

== Career ==
Worthington became interested in the performing arts when he began his career as an opera singer and stage actor. He entered films with a lead role in 1913, and one of his more notable films was Damon and Pythias in 1914. From 1917 to 1925, William concentrated on directing films and was the head of a film production firm called Multicolor, which was bought by Cinecolor in 1932. He was active in films up until his death in 1941.

== Filmography ==
=== Actor ===
- The Old Clerk (1913)
- The Restless Spirit (1913, Short) as A Stranger
- The Passerby (1913, short) as Mr. Klein
- Forgotten Women (1913, short) as The Reveller
- Back to Life (1913, short) as The Gambler
- The Barrier of Bars (1913, short)
- The Dread Inheritance (1913, short) as The Doctor
- Risen from the Ashes (1914, short)
- Samson (1914) as Ladal
- Stolen Glory (1914, short) as Paul Devine
- The Woman in Black (1914, short) as Prof. M. Byrd
- The Spy (1914) as Gen. George Washington
- On the Rio Grande (1914, short) as James Russell, Anna's Father
- Prowlers of the Wild (1914, short) as John
- The Sob Sister (1914, short) as Mr. Tracy
- Circle 17 (1914, short) as Prof. Bartoli
- Through the Flames (1914, short) as Bill Hampton, Bert's Pal
- A Prince of Bavaria (1914, short) as Peter Carson, Caroline's Father
- As the Wind Blows (1914, short) as The Husband
- Kid Regan's Hands (1914, short) as Bill Sweeney
- The Vagabond (1914, short) as The Father
- The Link That Binds (1914, short) as McClain, Donald's Father
- The Chorus Girl's Thanksgiving (1914, short)
- The Opened Shutters (1914) as Thinkright Johnson
- Damon and Pythias (1914) as Damon
- Called Back (1914) as Dr. Manuel Ceneri
- A Page from Life (1914, short) as Carter, Rita's Father
- The Big Sister's Christmas (1914, short) as Martin Towne
- The Flash (1915, short) as Old Carl Bauer
- Changed Lives (1915, short) as James
- The Black Box (1915, serial) as Prof. Ashleigh / Lord Ashleigh
- The Grail (1915, Short) as Griswold, Jean's Father
- Homage (1915, Short) as Abdiel O'Day, Erwin's Father
- The Great Ruby Mystery (1915, short) as Heinrich von Buclow
- The Queen of Hearts (1915, short) as Col. Phillipot
- The Reward of Chivalry (1916, short) as Minor Role (uncredited)
- A Wife at Bay (1916, short)
- Beyond the Trail (1916, short)
- High Heels (1921) as Joshua Barton
- The Green Goddess (1923) as The High Priest
- Red Lights (1923) as Luke Carson
- The Awful Truth (1925) as Jonathan Sims
- Her Honor, the Governor (1926)
- Kid Boots (1926) as Eleanor's father
- The Return of Boston Blackie (1927) as John Markham
- Good Morning, Judge (1928) as Mr. Grey Sr
- Half a Bride (1928) as Mr. Winslow
- Happiness Ahead (1928) as Mortimer Goodstone
- The Man Who Came Back (1931) as Capt. Gallon
- Finger Prints (1931) as John Mackey
- Shipmates (1931) as Adm. R.S. 'Bill' Schuyler
- The Trial of Vivienne Ware (1932) as Assistant Defense Attorney (uncredited)
- No More Orchids (1932) as Cannon (uncredited)
- The Keyhole (1933) as Extra on Ship (uncredited)
- Gabriel Over the White House (1933) as Member of Congress (uncredited)
- The Little Giant (1933) as Harry S. Ames, Cass-Winter Associate (uncredited)
- Picture Snatcher (1933) as Reporter Witnessing Execution (uncredited)
- The Silk Express (1933) as Annoyed Ship Passenger (uncredited)
- Melody Cruise (1933) as Guest at Bon Voyage Party (uncredited)
- Morning Glory (1933) as Banker, Party Guest (uncredited)
- Lady for a Day (1933) as Hotel Guest (uncredited)
- I Loved a Woman (1933) as Jefferson (uncredited)
- The Perils of Pauline (1933, serial) as American Consul [Ch. 1]
- Duck Soup (1933) as First Minister of Finance (uncredited)
- Design for Living (1933) as Theatre Patron (uncredited)
- You Can't Buy Everything (1934) as Teller (uncredited)
- Beggars in Ermine (1934) as Board Member (uncredited)
- The Gold Ghost (1934, Short) as Gloria's Father, Jim
- The World Moves On (1934) as Judge of Duel (uncredited)
- His Greatest Gamble (1934) as Dinner Guest (uncredited)
- Dames (1934) as Board Member in Show (uncredited)
- One Exciting Adventure (1934) as Man
- Tailspin Tommy (1934, Serial) as Denver Doctor [Ch. 6] (uncredited)
- The President Vanishes (1934) as Legislator
- Flirtation Walk (1934) as Civilian (scenes deleted)
- The Man Who Reclaimed His Head (1934) as Attendant (uncredited)
- Grand Old Girl (1935) as School Board Member (uncredited)
- Symphony of Living (1935) as Symphony Chairman
- A Notorious Gentleman (1935) as Minor Role (uncredited)
- Twenty Dollars a Week (1935) as Mr. Davidson
- A Night at the Ritz (1935) as Banker (uncredited)
- Cardinal Richelieu (1935) as King's Chamberlain
- Reckless (1935) as Wedding Guest (uncredited)
- The Casino Murder Case (1935) as First Bidder (uncredited)
- Public Hero No. 1 (1935) as Prison Board Member (uncredited)
- Hooray for Love (1935) as Man Nodding 'No' in Montage (uncredited)
- Love Me Forever (1935) as Bit Role (uncredited)
- Keeper of the Bees (1935) as Colonel
- Orchids to You (1935) as Judge at Flower Show (uncredited)
- Anna Karenina (1935) as Opera Spectator (uncredited)
- Diamond Jim (1935) as Man at Bar (uncredited)
- The Case of the Lucky Legs (1935) as Audience Member Next to Patton (uncredited)
- Grand Exit (1935) as Doctor (uncredited)
- In Old Kentucky (1935) as Bit (uncredited)
- If You Could Only Cook (1935) as Mr. Fletcher (uncredited)
- Magnificent Obsession (1935) as Man on Boat (uncredited)
- Dangerous Intrigue (1936) as Steel Mill Executive (uncredited)
- Champagne Charlie (1936) as Board Member (uncredited)
- The Law in Her Hands (1936) as Appellate Court judge (uncredited)
- The Crime of Dr. Forbes (1936) as Faculty Doctor (uncredited)
- The Final Hour (1936) as Judge (uncredited)
- Alibi for Murder (1936) as John J. Foster (uncredited)
- Polo Joe (1936) as Guest (uncredited)
- Can This Be Dixie? (1936) as George Washington Peachtree
- The Accusing Finger (1936) as Senator (uncredited)
- Camille (1936) as Extra in Casino (uncredited)
- Give Me Liberty (1936, Short) as Pendleton (uncredited)
- After the Thin Man (1936) as 'Respectable' Man in Car (uncredited)
- That Girl from Paris (1936) as Wedding Guest (uncredited)
- Battle of Greed (1937) as Judge William H. Avery
- Woman-Wise (1937) as Guest in Cafe (uncredited)
- The Devil's Playground (1937) as Vice Admiral (uncredited)
- Criminal Lawyer (1937) as Party Guest (uncredited)
- Man of the People (1937) as Judge (uncredited)
- The Last of Mrs. Cheyney (1937) as Extra on Ship (uncredited)
- Ready, Willing and Able (1937) as Elderly Man in Hallway (uncredited)
- Penny Wisdom (1937, Short) as Dinner Guest (uncredited)
- The Great Gambini (1937) as Elderly Man (uncredited)
- The Singing Marine (1937) as Ship Passenger (uncredited)
- Marry the Girl (1937) as George Washington (uncredited)
- Broadway Melody of 1938 (1937) as N.O. Norwich, Theatrical Agent in Montage (uncredited)
- The Footloose Heiress (1937) as Mr. Clark's Associate (uncredited)
- Music for Madame (1937) as Bus Passenger (uncredited)
- Alcatraz Island (1937) as First Trial Judge (uncredited)
- Live, Love and Learn (1937) as Mr. Killy (uncredited)
- Missing Witnesses (1937) as John - Radio Listener (uncredited)
- Hollywood Hotel (1937) as Man at Premiere (uncredited)
- Sergeant Murphy (1938) as Judge at Horse Show (uncredited)
- Walking Down Broadway (1938) as Judge (uncredited)
- Accidents Will Happen (1938) as Irate car owner getting bumped (uncredited)
- Women Are Like That (1938) as The Minister (uncredited)
- The Beloved Brat (1938) as Dr. Reynolds (uncredited)
- A Trip to Paris (1938) as Councilman (uncredited)
- Hold That Kiss (1938) as Dog Show Judge (uncredited)
- Squadron of Honor (1938) as Major (uncredited)
- The Amazing Dr. Clitterhouse (1938) as Updyke's Guest (uncredited)
- The Chaser (1938) as Dr. Matthews (uncredited)
- I Am the Law (1938) as Committee Man (uncredited)
- Boys Town (1938) as Governor (uncredited)
- The Spider's Web (1938) as Cantlon (uncredited)
- There Goes My Heart (1938) as Banker (uncredited)
- Young Dr. Kildare (1938) as Board Member (uncredited)
- The Cowboy and the Lady (1938) as Dinner Party Guest (uncredited)
- Gang Bullets (1938) as Judge (uncredited)
- Angels with Dirty Faces (1938) as Warden (uncredited)
- Sweethearts (1938) as Backstage Man at NBC Theater (uncredited)
- Homicide Bureau (1939) as Citizen League Member (uncredited)
- They Made Her a Spy (1939) as Senator in the Dome Cafe (uncredited)
- The Story of Vernon and Irene Castle (1939) as Man Reading Newspaper (uncredited)
- First Offenders (1939) as Judge (uncredited)
- Dark Victory (1939) as Specialist #1 (uncredited)
- Zenobia (1939) as Townsman (uncredited)
- Union Pacific (1939) as Oliver Ames (uncredited)
- The Girl from Mexico (1939) as Mr. Patton (uncredited)
- 6,000 Enemies (1939) as Frank Jordan (uncredited)
- The Forgotten Woman (1939) as Doctor (uncredited)
- Hawaiian Nights (1939) as Man in Hotel Lobby (uncredited)
- Espionage Agent (1939) as Instructor in Montage (uncredited)
- Rio (1939) as American Banker (uncredited)
- Pride of the Blue Grass (1939) as First Steward (uncredited)
- Mr. Smith Goes to Washington (1939) as Committeeman (uncredited)
- The Oklahoma Kid (1939) as (uncredited)
- Abe Lincoln in Illinois (1940) as Minor Role (uncredited)
- Law and Order (1940) as Judge Williams
- Blossoms in the Dust (1941) as City Councilman (uncredited)
- Joan of Ozark (1942) as Clem (uncredited) (final film role)

=== Director ===
- The Grail (1915)
- Homage (1915)
- The Gopher (1915)
- The Social Lion (1915)
- Misjudged (1915)
- The Queen of Hearts (1915)
- Her Prey (1915)
- The Fair God of Sun Island (1915)
- On the Level (1915)
- In Search of a Wife (1915)
- As the Shadows Fall (1915)
- The Reward of Chivalry (1916)
- The Family Secret (1916)
- The Dupe (1916)
- After the Play (1916)
- The Best Man's Bride (1916)
- The Mark of a Gentleman (1916)
- Darcy of the Northwest Mounted (1916)
- The Wire Pullers (1916)
- Bringing Home Father (1916)
- The Rose Colored Scarf (1916)
- The False Part (1916)
- They Wouldn't Take Him Seriously (1916)
- Nature Incorporated (1916)
- Lee Blount Goes Home (1916)
- Cross Purposes (1916)
- The Heart of a Show Girl (1916)
- Main 4400 (1916)
- Love Never Dies (1916)
- The Masked Woman (1916)
- A Stranger from Somewhere (1916)
- Little Partner (1916)
- Bringing Home Father (1917)
- The Devil's Pay Day (1917)
- The Man Who Took a Chance (1917)
- The Clock (1917)
- The Car of Chance (1917)
- The Clean-Up (1917)
- The Beloved Traitor (1918)
- Twenty-One (1918)
- The Ghost of the Rancho (1918)
- His Birthright (1918)
- The Gray Horizon (1919)
- The Courageous Coward (1919)
- A Heart in Pawn (1919)
- His Debt (1919)
- All Wrong (1919)
- The Man Beneath (1919)
- The Dragon Painter (1919)
- Bonds of Honor (1919)
- The Illustrious Prince (1919)
- The Tong Man (1919)
- The Beggar Prince (1920)
- The Silent Barrier (1920)
- The Greater Profit (1921)
- The Unknown Wife (1921)
- The Beautiful Gambler (1921)
- Opened Shutters (1921)
- Go Straight (1921)
- Dr. Jim (1921)
- Tracked to Earth (1922)
- Out of the Silent North (1922)
- Afraid to Fight (1922)
- Kindled Courage (1923)
- The Bolted Door (1923)
- Fashionable Fakers (1923)
- Beauty and the Bad Man (1925)
- The Girl on the Stairs (1925)

== See also ==
- Multicolor
