= The Swamp (1921 film) =

1921 silent film by Colin Campbell

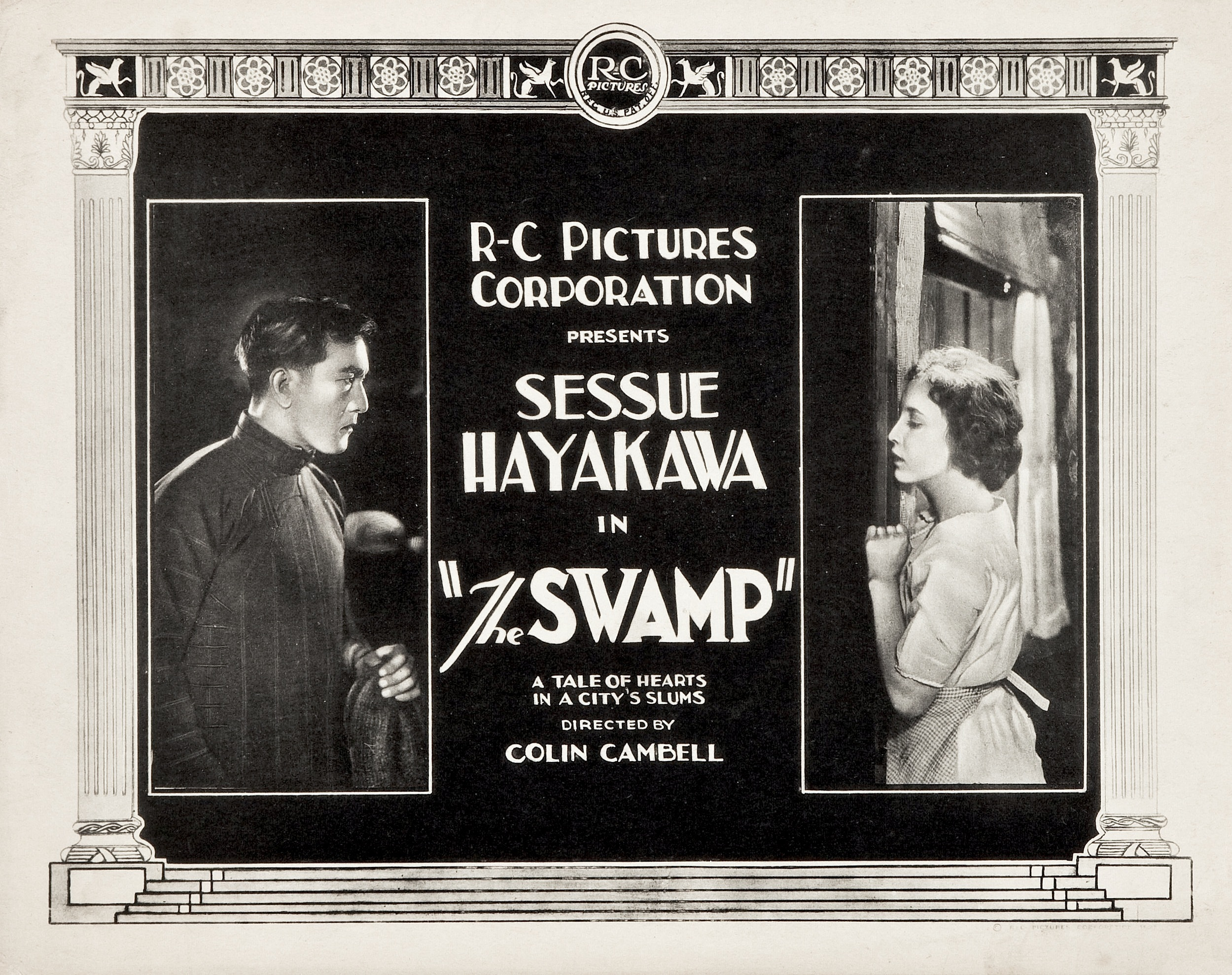
- Lobby card
- Directed by: Colin Campbell
- Written by: J. Grubb Alexander (scenario)
- Story by: Sessue Hayakawa
- Produced by: Sessue Hayakawa
- Starring: Sessue Hayakawa; Bessie Love
- Cinematography: Frank D. Williams
- Distributed by: Robertson-Cole Pictures Corporation
- Release date: October 30, 1921 (U.S.)
- Running time: 6 reels; 5,560 feet
- Country: United States
- Language: Silent (English intertitles)

The Swamp (called Le Devin du faubourg/The Neighborhood Fortune-Teller in France) is a 1921 American silent drama film released by the Robertson-Cole Pictures Corporation and directed by Colin Campbell. The film was written and produced by Sessue Hayakawa, who also co-stars with Bessie Love. A print of this film is preserved at the Gosfilmofond archive in Moscow.

== Plot ==
Mary and her son Buster live in a single room in a tenement in the slums of the city, having been deserted by their husband and father, wealthy Spencer Wellington. While selling newspapers, Buster meets Wang, a vegetable peddler. Wang protects Buster from attack, and receives a black eye in the endeavor. When Mary becomes ill, Wang cares for her until she is well. When Mary and Buster are about to be evicted, Wang sells his horse and vegetable stand to help them out, and he and Buster team up and become fortune-tellers.

Through Wang, Mary learns that her husband is planning to remarry. When Wang entertains at the wedding reception, he reveals Spencer's past, and Spencer's new fiance, society lady Norma Biddle, ends the engagement. Mary obtains a divorce from Spencer, and marries the new rent collector Johnnie Rand, who is a former sweetheart. Wang is able to retrieve his horse, and he returns to his homeland, where he is reunited with his sweetheart.

== Cast ==
- Sessue Hayakawa as Wang
- Bessie Love as Mary
- Janice Wilson as Norma Biddle
- Frankie Lee as Buster
- Lillian Langdon as Mrs. Biddle
- Harland Tucker as Spencer Wellington
- Ralph McCullough as Johnnie Rand

== Reception ==
The film received positive reviews, and Hayakawa and Love received praise for their performances.
