= The Courageous Coward =

1919 film by William Worthington

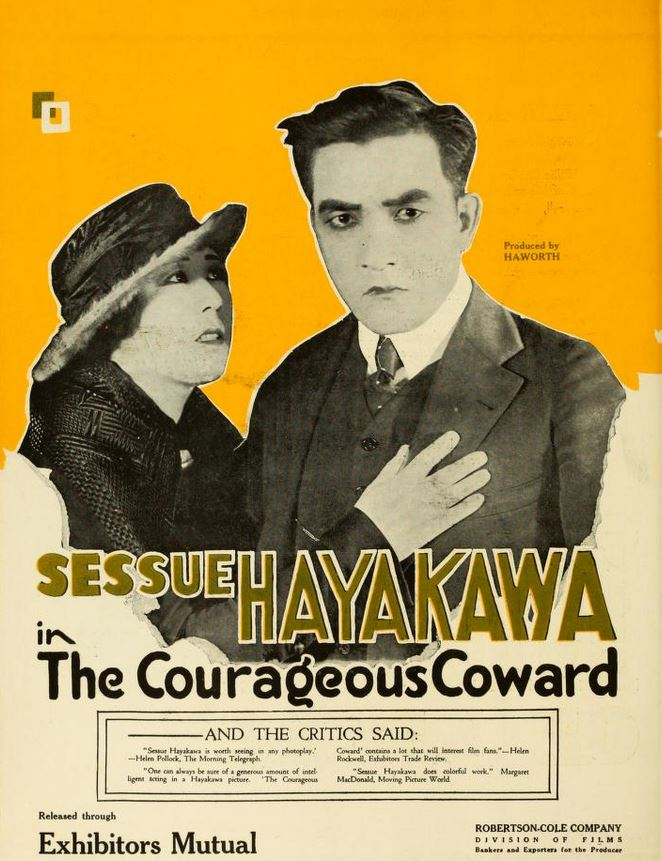
- Advertisement for film
- Directed by: William Worthington
- Written by: Thomas J. Geraghty; Frances Guihan (scenario)
- Starring: Sessue Hayakawa; Tsuru Aoki
- Cinematography: Dal Clawson
- Production company: Haworth Pictures Corporation
- Distributed by: Exhibitors Mutual / Robertson-Cole
- Release date: April 1919
- Running time: 5 reels
- Country: United States
- Language: Silent (English intertitles)

The Courageous Coward is a 1919 American silent drama film directed by William Worthington and featuring Sessue Hayakawa and Tsuru Aoki in lead roles.

== Plot ==
As described in a film magazine, Suki, born and educated in America, still worships the customs of his ancestral country. Foreign born Rei arrives in Chinatown and wins his heart. He goes to college to finish his law studies, leaving Rei to await his return. Rei is led to believe that she should become Americanized to please him on his return, so she learns the way of the cabarets in the company of Tom Kirby, son of ward boss Big Bill Kirby.

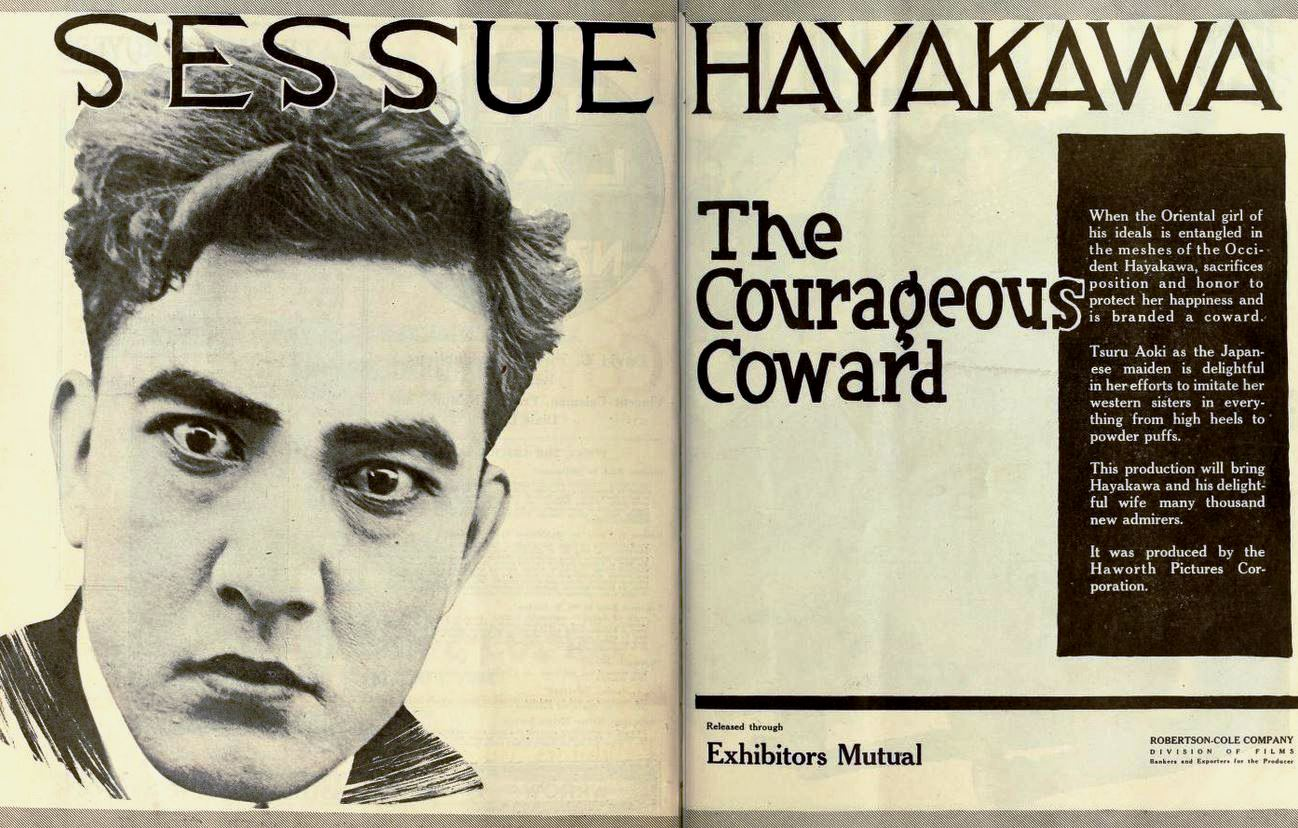
Advertisement in Moving Picture World, April 1919.

Suki returns and is disappointed. Rei finally consents to elope with Tom, leaving Suki lost to her. A murder is committed and Suki prosecutes a suspect almost to the point of conviction when Tom confesses his guilt to him. When Suki refuses to go forward with the case, he is branded a coward and disgraced, with only Rei believing in him. At length Tom confesses to the murder and prepares to stand trial, his confession clearing Suki and leaving him free to marry Rei.

== Cast ==
- Sessue Hayakawa as Suki Iota
- Tsuru Aoki as Rei Oaki
- Toyo Fujita as Tangi
- George Hernandez as Big Bill Kirby
- Francis McDonald as Tom Kirby (credited as Francis J. McDonald)
- Buddy Post as Cupid

== Preservation ==
Only the fifth reel of The Courageous Coward is known to survive, held by EYE Filmmuseum in the Netherlands. It is otherwise considered a lost film.
