= Richard Schayer =

American screenwriter

- Born: December 13, 1880; Washington, D.C., USA
- Died: March 13, 1956 (aged 75); Hollywood, California, USA
- Years active: 1916–1956

Richard Schayer (December 13, 1880 – March 13, 1956) was an American screenwriter. He wrote for more than 100 films between 1916 and 1956. He was born in Washington, D.C., son of Col. George Frederick Schayer and writer Julia Schayer, and died in Hollywood, California. He was one of seven studio executives who worked at Universal Pictures during the golden age of Laemmle management.

He co-wrote the original story upon which the Universal Pictures horror classic The Mummy starring Boris Karloff was based on.

== Selected filmography ==
- Blindfolded (1918)
- The Dragon Painter (1919)
- The Tong Man (1919)
- The Westerners (1919)
- When a Man Loves (1919)
- An Arabian Knight (1920)
- The Killer (1921)
- The Spenders (1921)
- Beach of Dreams (1921)
- The Man of the Forest (1921)
- The Lure of Egypt (1921)
- Black Roses (1921)
- The Glory of Clementina (1922)
- The Ramblin' Kid (1923)
- The Victor (1923)
- The Thrill Chaser (1923)
- Hook and Ladder (1924)
- Ride for Your Life (1924)
- Ridgeway of Montana (1924)
- The Dangerous Flirt (1924)
- Silk Stocking Sal (1924)
- The Ridin' Kid from Powder River (1924)
- The Man in Blue (1925)
- The Calgary Stampede (1925)
- Beauty and the Bad Man (1925)
- The Seventh Bandit (1926)
- The Frontier Trail (1926)
- Rustlers' Ranch (1926)
- The Terror (1926)
- Devil-May-Care (1929)
- Where East Is East (1929)
- Hallelujah! (1929)
- Trader Horn (1931)
- Private Lives (1931)
- The Mummy (1932)
- Night World (1932)
- The Black Arrow (1948)
- The Iroquois Trail (1950)
- Kim (1950)
- Children of Pleasure (1930)
- Indian Uprising (1952)
- Khyber Patrol (1954)
