= Manchu Love =

1929 film

- Directed by: Elmer Clifton
- Written by: Jack Cunningham
- Produced by: Herbert T. Kalmus
- Starring: Sojin; Etta Lee; Tetsu Komai; Le Ong; Gum Chun; Al Chang; Baby Wai
- Cinematography: Ray Rennahan
- Production companies: Metro-Goldwyn-Mayer; Technicolor Corporation
- Distributed by: Metro-Goldwyn-Mayer
- Release date: January 12, 1929
- Running time: 20 minutes
- Country: United States
- Languages: Silent; English intertitles
- Budget: $16,240

Manchu Love is a 1929 American pre-code Hollywood Metro-Goldwyn-Mayer short silent historical fiction film short in two-color Technicolor. The film features a cast entirely of people of Asian descent and stars Sojin as Su Shun and Etta Lee as Empress Tzu Hsi. It was the ninth film produced as part of Metro-Goldwyn-Mayer's "Great Events" series.

== Production ==
The film was shot at the Tec-Art Studio in Hollywood. Director Elmer Clifton was paid $1000.00 for his work on this film and Light of India, a later entry in the series. The art direction and color supervision by Natalie Kalmus drew significant praise despite the project having one of the lowest budgets in the "Great Events" series.

== Preservation status ==
This film has survived in its entirety. A complete print was preserved by the Cinema Arts Laboratory in 1993 and is held in the archives at the George Eastman House. It was screened as recently as 2015 at the Museum of Modern Art's Roy and Niuta Titus Theater for a presentation by authors James Layton and David Pierce.
