= Light of India =

1929 film

- Directed by: Elmer Clifton
- Produced by: Herbert T. Kalmus
- Starring: Betty Boyd; Shogwan Singh; Harold Goodwin
- Production companies: Metro-Goldwyn-Mayer; Technicolor Corporation
- Distributed by: Metro-Goldwyn-Mayer
- Release date: March 9, 1929
- Country: United States
- Languages: Silent; English Intertitles

Light of India is a 1929 MGM short silent film short in two-color Technicolor. It was the tenth film produced as part of Metro-Goldwyn-Mayer's "Great Events" series.

== Production ==
The film was shot at the Tec-Art Studio in Hollywood. Director Elmer Clifton was paid $1000.00 for his work on this film and earlier series entry Manchu Love.

== Preservation status ==
Light of India is believed to be lost.
