= The Remittance Woman =

1923 film directed by Wesley Ruggles

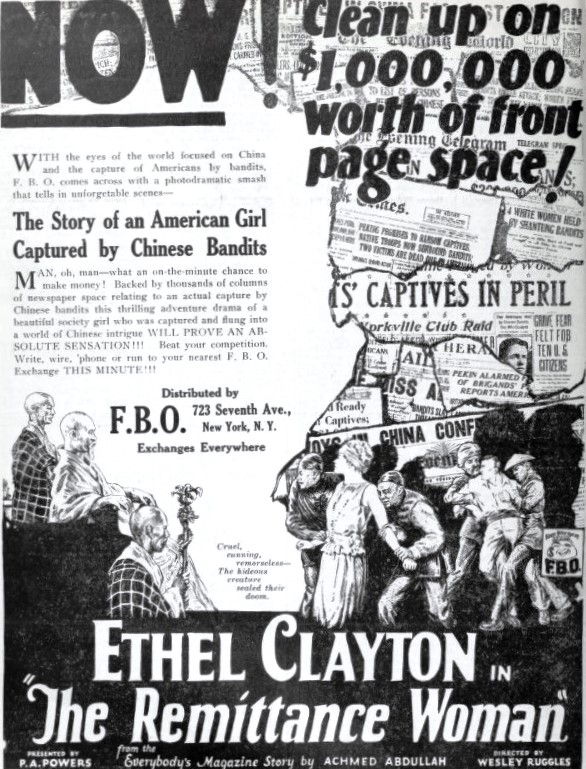
- Trade advertisement
- Directed by: Wesley Ruggles
- Written by: Achmed Abdullah (novel); Carol Warren
- Starring: Ethel Clayton; Rockliffe Fellowes; Mario Carillo
- Cinematography: Joseph A. Du Bray
- Production company: Robertson-Cole Pictures Corporation
- Distributed by: Film Booking Offices of America
- Release date: May 12, 1923
- Running time: 60 minutes
- Country: United States
- Language: Silent (English intertitles)

The Remittance Woman is a 1923 American silent drama film directed by Wesley Ruggles and starring Ethel Clayton, Rockliffe Fellowes, and Mario Carillo. A remittance man (or woman) was one sent away from home (usually Britain) to avoid shame on the family. The following year a book of the same title appeared, by American pulp author Achmed Abdullah.

== Cast ==
- Ethel Clayton as Marie Campbell
- Rockliffe Fellowes as George Holt
- Mario Carillo as Moses d'Acosta
- Frank Lanning as Tsang Tse
- Tom Wilson as Higginson
- Etta Lee as Liu Po-Yat
- James B. Leong as Chuen To Yan
- Edward Kimball as Anthony Campbell
- Toyo Fujita as Sun Yu-Wen

== Preservation ==
With no prints of The Remittance Woman located in any film archives, it is a lost film.

== Bibliography ==
- Goble, Alan. The Complete Index to Literary Sources in Film. Walter de Gruyter, 1999.
