= Black Roses (1921 film) =

1921 film

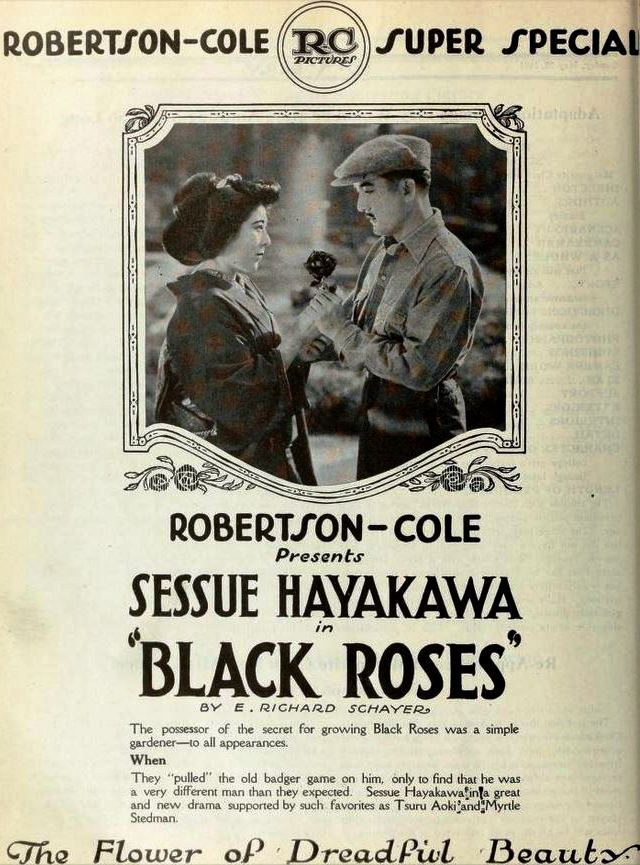
- Advertisement for the film
- Directed by: Colin Campbell
- Written by: Richard Schayer
- Starring: Sessue Hayakawa; Myrtle Stedman; Tsuru Aoki; Andrew Robson; Toyo Fujita
- Cinematography: Frank D. Williams
- Production company: Hayakawa Feature Play Company
- Distributed by: Robertson-Cole Distributing Corporation
- Release date: May 22, 1921 (USA)
- Running time: 6 reels
- Country: United States
- Language: Silent (English intertitles)

Black Roses is a 1921 American silent crime drama film directed by Colin Campbell. Sessue Hayakawa, Myrtle Stedman, Tsuru Aoki, Andrew Robson, and Toyo Fujita appeared in the film.

== Plot ==
As described in a film magazine, when Benson Burleigh is found murdered with his gardener Yoda beside him with a knife in his hand, the police conclude that Yoda is guilty. While in prison Yoda learns that 'Monocle' Harry, Blanche De Vore, and Wong Fu framed him of the crime. When the opportunity arrives, with the assistance of his fellow convicts he steals a locomotive while its crew is eating lunch and uses it to burst through the prison yard gates. He drives the locomotive at full speed until they outrun an automobile full of prison guards. With money provided by a fellow cellmate, he poses as a wealthy Japanese nobleman. He outwits the trio of criminals and frees his wife Blossom, whom they had kidnapped, and turns them over to the police.

== Cast ==
- Sessue Hayakawa as Yoda
- Myrtle Stedman as Blanche De Vore
- Tsuru Aoki as Blossom
- Andrew Robson as Benson Burleigh
- Toyo Fujita as Wong Fu
- Henry Herbert as 'Monocle' Harry
- Harold Holland as Detective Cleary
- Carrie Clark Ward as Bridget

== Preservation ==
A complete print of Black Roses is held by the Cinémathèque française in Paris.
