= The Honorable Friend =

1916 film by Edward LeSaint

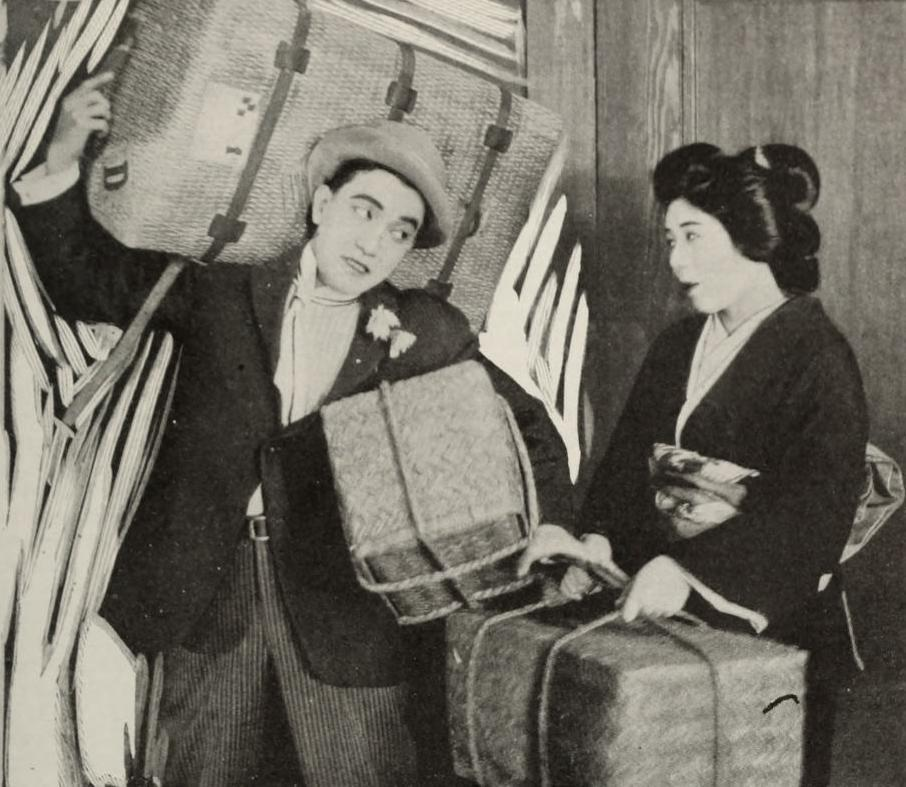
- Publicity photo for the film
- Directed by: Edward LeSaint
- Screenplay by: Elizabeth McGaffey; Eve Unsell
- Produced by: Jesse L. Lasky
- Starring: Sessue Hayakawa; Tsuru Aoki; Raymond Hatton; Goro Kino; M. Matsumato; William Elmer
- Cinematography: Harold Rosson
- Production company: Jesse L. Lasky Feature Play Company
- Distributed by: Paramount Pictures
- Release date: August 27, 1916
- Running time: 50 minutes
- Country: United States
- Language: English

The Honorable Friend is a 1916 American silent drama film and Edward LeSaint's directorial debut. It was written by Elizabeth McGaffey and Eve Unsell. The film stars Sessue Hayakawa and Tsuru Aoki. The film was released on August 27, 1916, by Paramount Pictures.

== Plot ==
As described in a film magazine, a curio dealer, Kayosho, is torn between his fiancée, Hana, and her cousin, Toki-Ye, who lives in Japan. Kayosho brings Toki-Ye to California under the impression that she will marry his employee, Makino. Toki-Ye and Makino fall in love and are married, but Kayosho tries to come between them. Kayosho is found dead and the young couple both confess to his murder, each believing that the other is guilty. However, it was Hana's father, Goto, who murdered Kayosho over the broken engagement. Once both Toki-Ye and Makino are cleared of the murder, they live happily ever after.

== Cast ==
- Sessue Hayakawa as Makino
- Tsuru Aoki as Toki-Ye
- Raymond Hatton as Kayosho
- Goro Kino as Goto
- M. Matsumato as Hana
- William Elmer as Murphy

== Preservation ==
With no prints of The Honorable Friend located in any film archives, it is considered a lost film.
