= Togo Yamamoto =

Japanese actor (1886–1952)

Yamamoto Tōgō
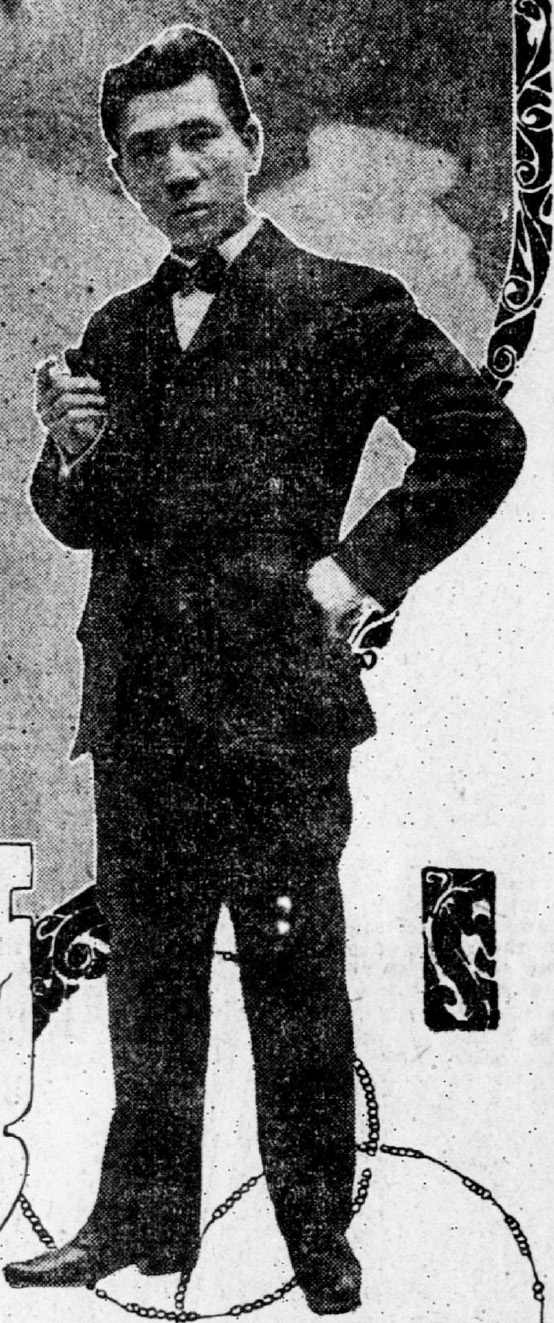
- San Francisco newspaper, 1906
- Born: 4 November 1886; Yokohama, Japan
- Died: March 24, 1952 (aged 65)
- Occupation: Actor
- Years active: 1904–1947

Togo Yamamoto (山本冬郷, Yamamoto Tōgō; November 4, 1886 – March 24, 1952) was a pioneering actor who appeared on stage and film in the United States and Japan.

== Biography ==
Born in Yokohama, Japan, on 4 November 1886, Togo emigrated to the United States and began an acting career in the early years of the 20th century.

Yamamoto told Blanche Partington in a 1906 interview that he had been "in the dramatic business" in Japan, playing "tragedy, comedy, both" before coming to the United States. His first appearance on the American stage was in The White Tigress of Japan (1904), a play about the Russo-Japanese War. "I was Japanese spy—I killed half a dozen Russians every night!" he told Partington. Theatrical manager Kirke La Shelle spotted him in the production and hired him to play the part of a Japanese servant in The Heir to the Hoorah (1905).

Yamamoto subsequently appeared in a number of stage plays, including The Offenders (1908), An American Widow (1909), The Inferior Sex (1910), The Muezzin (1910), Kismet (1911), Miss Phoenix (1913), and others.

In 1918, Yamamoto made his first appearances on the silver screen in The Midnight Patrol (1918) and The City of Dim Faces (1918). In both films he played Chinese characters, as he did in many of his later American films. He appeared in more than a dozen American films, most notably Cecil B. DeMille's Something to Think About (1920), in which he played a Japanese servant, and Flesh and Blood, a 1922 film starring Lon Chaney, in which he played a Chinese character, The Prince.

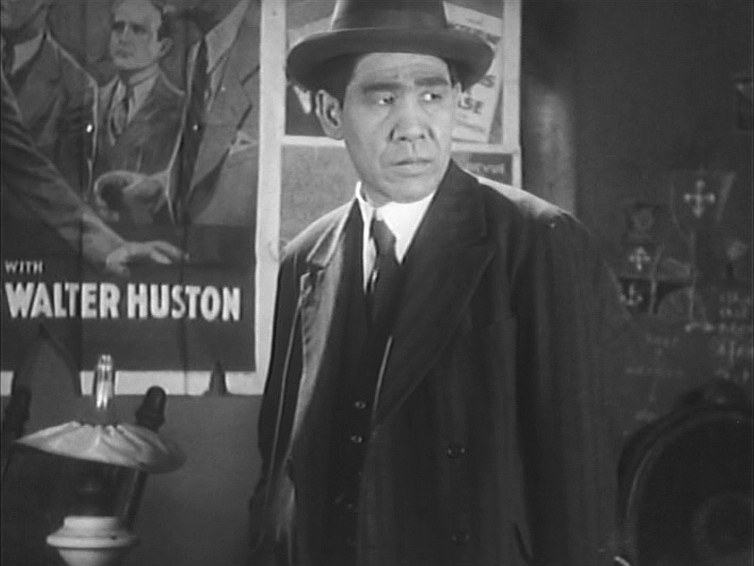
Tōgō Yamamoto in Sono yo no tsuma (1930)

In 1925, Yamamoto returned to his native Japan and appeared with Tokihiko Okada in a film entitled Maboroshi no hansen. After a four-year hiatus, he returned to the Japanese screen in two 1929 films and no fewer than eleven 1930 films, including Sono yo no tsuma and Ojosan, both directed by Yasujirō Ozu.

He worked steadily through the 1930s, appearing in more than 40 films, working with directors like Ozu and Hiroshi Shimizu, usually in supporting roles. In the 1940s, however, he appeared in only a handful of films. Among his last were Nishi manrui (Two outs, Bases Loaded, 1946) and Yottsu no koi no monogatari (Four Tales of Passion, 1947).

== Partial filmography ==
- The City of Dim Faces (1918)
- The Willow Tree (1920)
- The River's End (1920)
- Pagan Love (1920)
- Something to Think About (1920)
- A Tale of Two Worlds (1921)
- Where Lights Are Low (1921)
- The Lure of Jade (1921)
- Reported Missing (1922)
- Flesh and Blood (1922)
- The Shock (1923)
- Head Winds (1925)
- That Night's Wife (その夜の妻 Sono Yo no Tsuma, 1930)
