= Etta Lee =

American actress

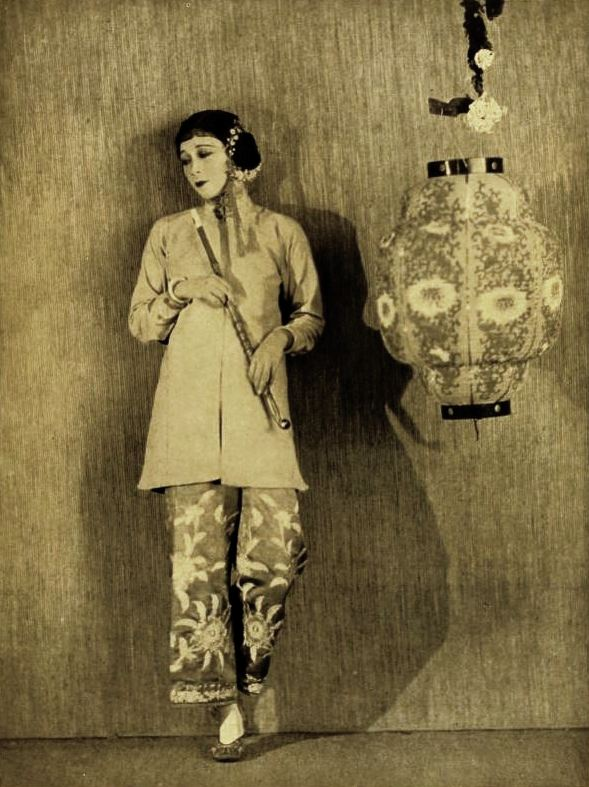
- From a 1923 magazine
- Born: Etta Lee Frost; September 12, 1906; Kauai, Territory of Hawaii, U.S.
- Died: October 27, 1956 (aged 50); Eureka, California, U.S.
- Occupation: Actress
- Years active: 1921–1935
- Spouse: Frank Robinson Brown (m. 1932–1956)

Etta Lee Frost (September 12, 1906 – October 27, 1956) was an American silent film actress, known for supporting roles.

== Early life ==
Etta Lee Frost was born on September 12, 1906, in Kauai, Territory of Hawaii (now Hawaii), as the daughter of Martin B. Frost. Her father was a Chinese medical doctor and her mother was of French ancestry. She had a sister, Ella Deverill, and grew up in California and went on to get her degree in education at Occidental College in Los Angeles. Lee moved back to Hawaii to be a teacher, before returning to Los Angeles to begin her career as an actress.

== Career ==
Lee's first film was A Tale of Two Worlds in 1921, where she played Ah Fah, a Chinese maid. She played another Chinese maid named Liu in the 1923 film The Remittance Woman, a maid in The Untameable (1923), A Thief in Paradise (1925), The Trouble with Wives (1925), and International House (1933). Other so-called exotic roles she was cast in included The Slave of the Sand Board in The Thief of Bagdad (1924). In 1923, she was called the only Eurasian girl in films.

Lee directly commented on the lack of diversity in her roles in an article in 1924. She noted that "I am equipped…to show oriental impulse and emotional complexities. But in this field I have not yet had opportunity." She went on to discuss that even in terms of getting roles meant for Chinese women, she was often turned down because she was of mixed race and did not look Chinese enough.

She made her first stage debut in the summer of 1927, with a production of The Scarlet Virgin in Los Angeles.

== Personal life ==
In 1932, Lee married Frank Robinson Brown, a Welsh-born radio announcer and columnist, and retired from acting afterward. She became active in her community following retirement, becoming chairwoman of the Eureka Woman's Club. She was also an active member of the Episcopal Church.

Lee died at her residence in Eureka, California, on October 27, 1956, at the age of 50. She was survived by her husband, sister, and two nephews.

== Filmography ==
=== Film ===
Year	Title	Role	Notes
1921	A Tale of Two Worlds	Ah Fah	
1922	The Toll of the Sea	gossip	
1922	The Infidel	Chinese girl	Lost film
1922	East is West		Uncredited role
1923	The Remittance Woman	Liu Po-Yat	Lost film
1923	The Untameable	Ah Moy	
1924	The Thief of Baghdad	slave of the Sand Board	Uncredited role
1925	A Thief in Paradise	Rosa's maid	Lost film
1925	The Dressmaker from Paris	mannequin	Uncredited role Lost film
1925	Recompense	dancing girl	Lost film
1925	The Trouble with Wives	maid	Lost film
1927	Camille	Mataloti	Incomplete film
1927	The Chinese Parrot	girl in gambling den	Lost film
1929	Manchu Love	Empress Tzu Hsi	
1933	International House	Peggy's maid	Uncredited role
1934	The Mysterious Mr. Wong	Lusan - Moonflower's attendant	
1935	Clive of India	slave girl	Uncredited role
1935	Let's Live Tonight	manicurist	Uncredited role
