= Five Days to Live =

1922 film by Norman Dawn

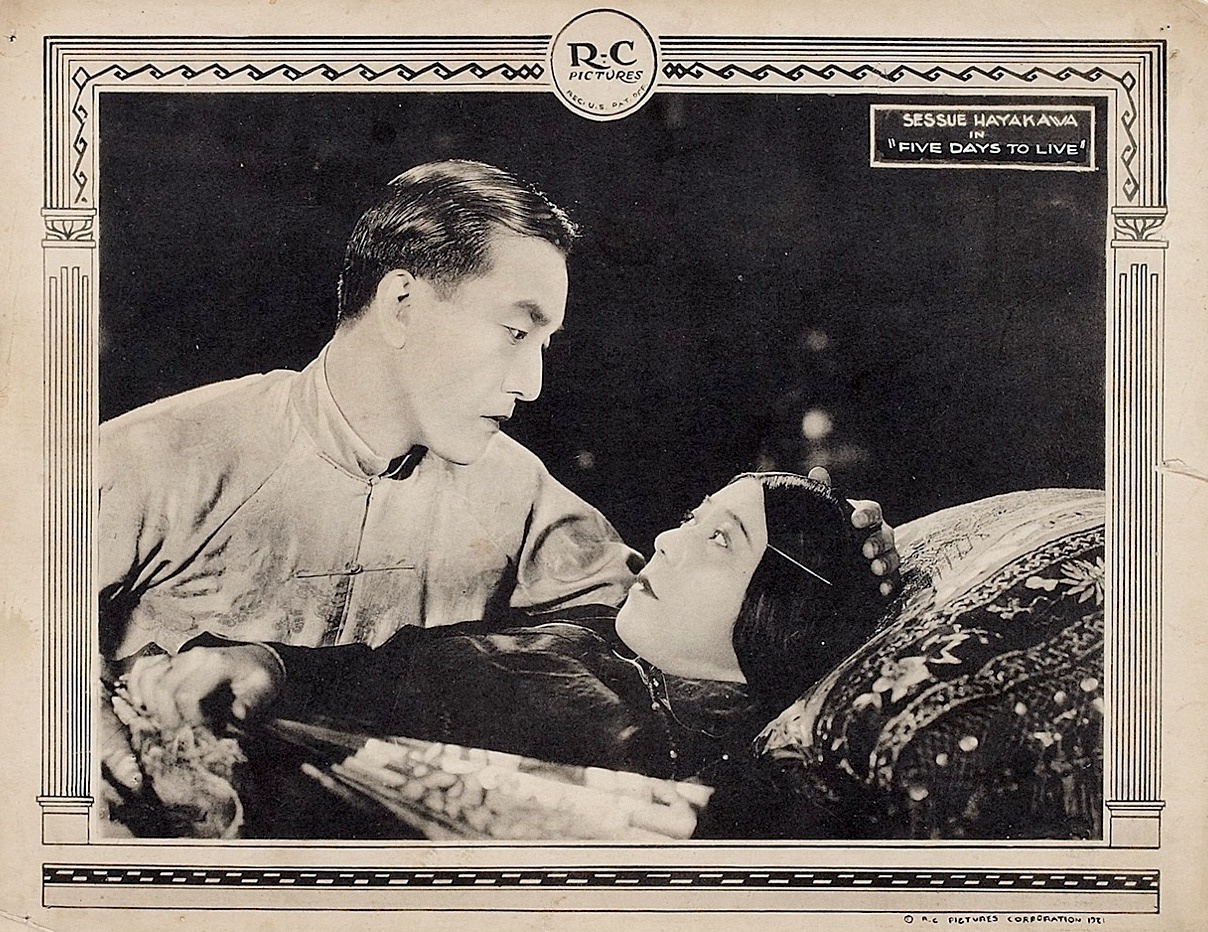
- Lobby card
- Directed by: Norman Dawn
- Screenplay by: Eve Unsell; Garrett Fort
- Story by: Dorothy Goodfellow
- Based on: The Street of the Flying Dragon by Dorothy Goodfellow
- Starring: Sessue Hayakawa; Tsuru Aoki; Goro Kino
- Production company: Robertson-Cole Pictures Corporation
- Release date: January 8, 1922 (USA)
- Running time: 60 min
- Country: United States
- Language: Silent (English intertitles)

Five Days to Live is a 1922 American silent drama film directed by Norman Dawn and featuring Sessue Hayakawa, Tsuru Aoki, Goro Kino, Misao Seki, Toyo Fujita, and George Kuwa.

An impoverished Chinese vase painter is considered an unsuitable suitor for his lover. He accepts the offer of a wealthy thief to die in his place at the day of his execution, in exchange for payment in gold. Paid in advance, the painter marries his lover. Five days later, he attempts to fulfil his promise and die at the thief's place. But he learns that the thief has already died from a cholera infection, and there is no need for him to die.

== Plot ==
As described in a film magazine, Tai Leung, a poor artist who paints vases, befriends Ko Ai when she is knocked down by a passing vehicle and he later returns a pig to her that was lost in the melee. Her guardian orders him from the place, but his love for the young Chinese woman grows stronger each day and he makes love to her by stealth through the barred window of her room. To satisfy a debt owed by the guardian, Ko Ai is betrothed to a wicked old money lender and Tai becomes desperate as the day of the wedding approaches. On learning that the notorious thief "The Canton Wolf," who is set to be executed in five days, will turn over his ill-gotten wealth to anyone who will take his place on the day of his execution, Tai goes to him and agrees to be his substitute in return for his gold. The Tai then showers Ko Ai with jewels and money and wins her guardian's consent for their marriage. The five days of their honeymoon slip by rapidly and, on the last day, Tai tells her of his sacrifice. She agrees to die also. Tai goes to the prison to fulfill his promise but is saved from the executioner's ax as he finds that "The Wolf" has died from cholera. Tai rushes back to his cottage just in time to save his bride from taking her own life by inhaling poisonous incense.

== Cast ==
- Sessue Hayakawa as Tai Leung
- Tsuru Aoki as Ko Ai
- Goro Kino as Chong Wo
- Misao Seki as Li
- Toyo Fujita as Young Foo
- George Kuwa as Hop Sing

== Preservation ==
With no prints of Five Days to Live located in any film archives, it is considered a lost film. Five Days to Live was cited on The National Film Preservation Board's list of Lost U.S. Silent Feature Films as of October 2019.
