= A Tokio Siren =

1920 film by Norman Dawn

A Tokyo Siren
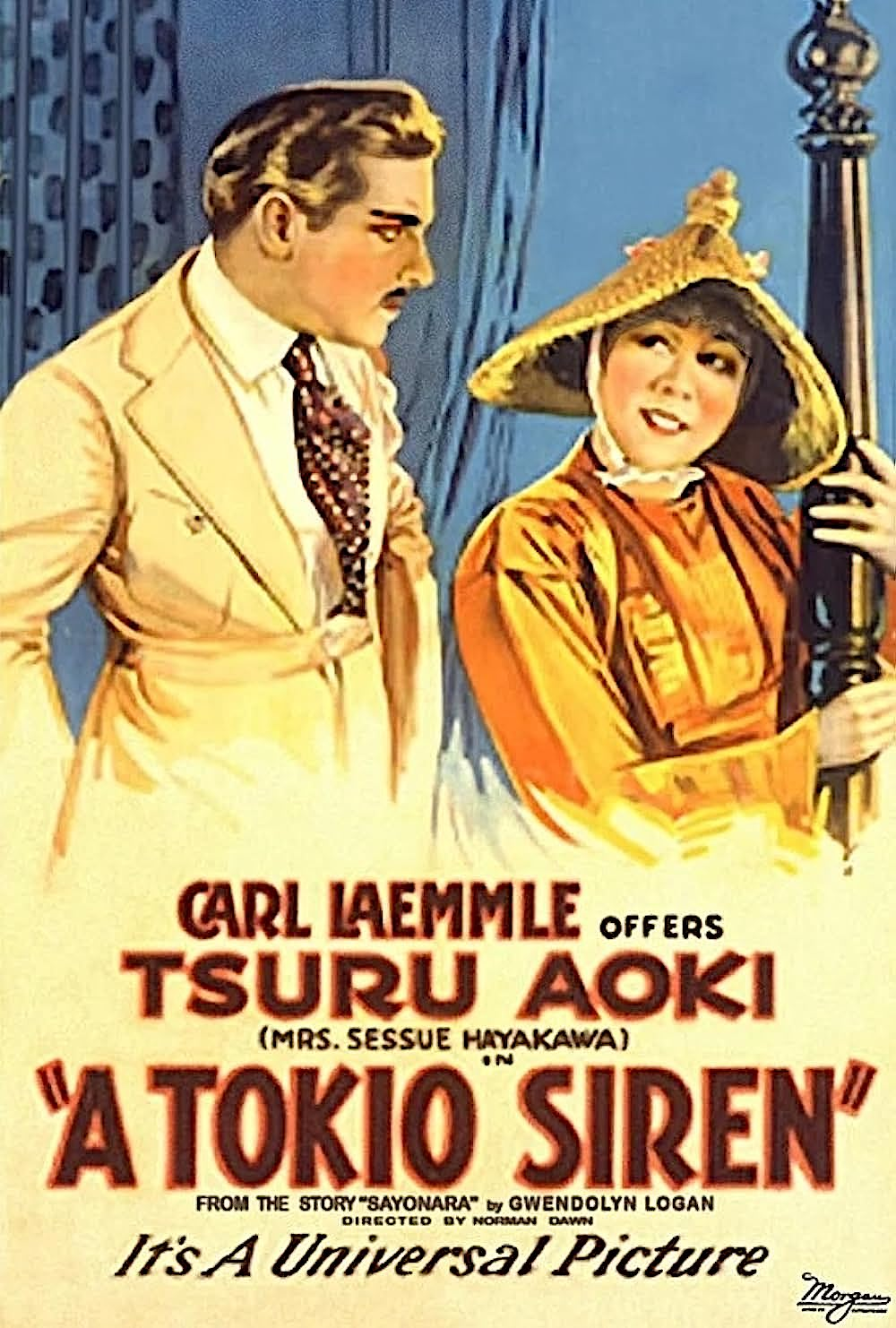
- Movie poster
- Directed by: Norman Dawn
- Written by: Gwendolyn Logan; Doris Schroeder
- Starring: Tsuru Aoki; Jack Livingston; Goro Kino; Toyo Fujita; Arthur Jasmine; Peggy Pearce
- Cinematography: Thomas Rae
- Production company: Universal Film Manufacturing Company
- Distributed by: Universal Film Manufacturing Company
- Release date: June 1920
- Running time: 50 minutes
- Country: United States
- Language: Silent (English intertitles)

A Tokio Siren (also known as A Tokyo Siren) is a 1920 American silent drama film directed by Norman Dawn and starring Tsuru Aoki, Jack Livingston, Goro Kino, Toyo Fujita and Arthur Jasmine. The film was based on Gwendolyn Logan's story "Cayonara."

The final scenes of the film were shot on location on Catalina Island. Footage was featured in Decasia, an American collage film by director Bill Morrison.

== Plot ==
A young American doctor is in Tokyo trying to heal his heartbreak after being jilted by his lover. Just as he is about to return to his home country, he decides to help a young Japanese woman escape a bad situation by making her legally his wife. When the doctor arrives in America, his former lover returns, and is sad to find that he is married. Meanwhile, the young woman begins to fall for the doctor's Japanese assistant.

== Cast ==
- Tsuru Aoki as Asuti Hishuri
- Jack Livingston (billed as Jack Livingstone) as Dr. Niblock
- Goro Kino as Hakami
- Toyo Fujita as Hishuri
- Arthur Jasmine as Ito
- Peggy Pearce as Ethel
- Florence Hart as Amelia Niblock
- Frederick Vroom as Mr. Chandler
- Eleanor Hancock as Mrs. Chandler
- Dorothy Hipp as Matsu

== Preservation ==
Complete prints of A Tokio Siren are held by the Museum of Modern Art in New York and the National Archives of Canada in Ottawa.
