= Tetsu Komai =

Japanese-American actor (1894–1970)

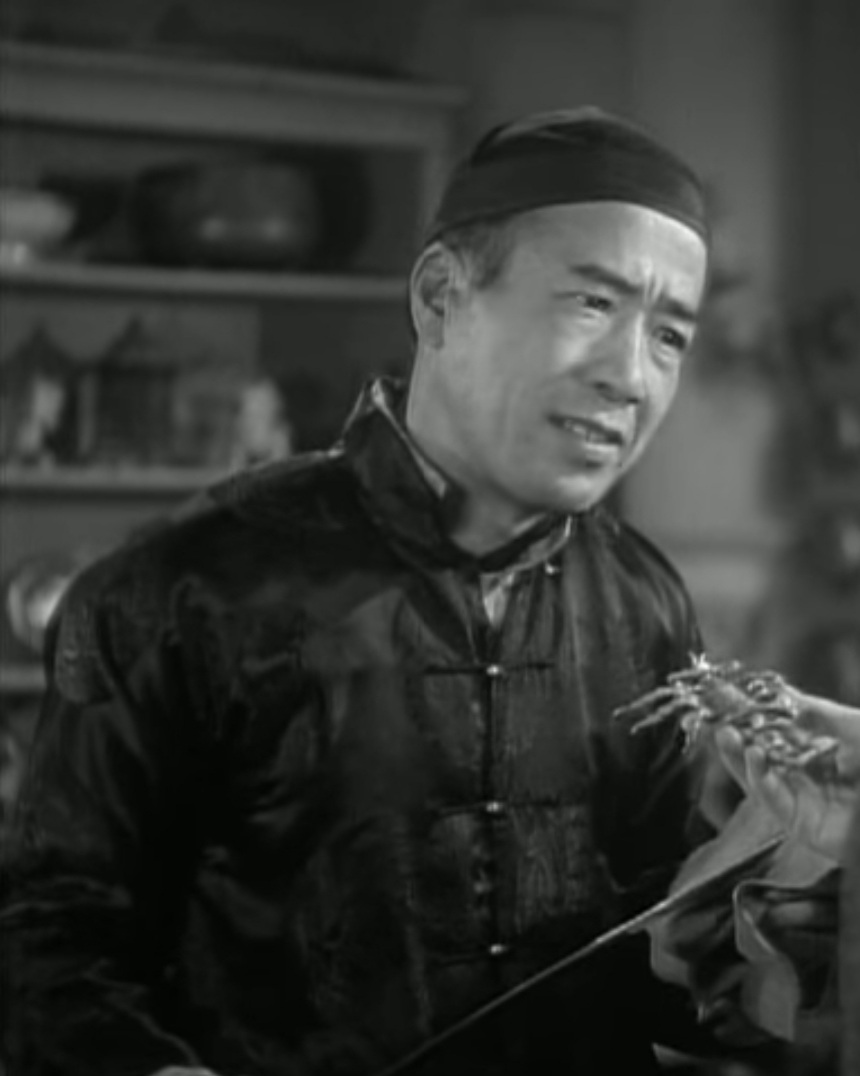
- Komai in Adventures of Captain Marvel (1941)
- Born: 駒井哲; 23 April 1894; Kumamoto, Kyushu, Japan
- Died: 10 August 1970 (aged 76); Gardena, California, U.S.
- Other names: Tetsuo Komai
- Occupation: Actor
- Years active: 1925–1964

Tetsu Komai (駒井哲, Komai Tetsu) (23 April 1894 – 10 August 1970), also known as Tetsuo Komai, was a Japanese-born American actor, known for his minor roles in Hollywood films.

== Biography ==
Born in Kumamoto, Kyushu, Komai had small parts in over 50 films from the 1920s until the mid-1960s. In his early films, Tetsu, who was usually called on to play Chinese characters, was often described with derogatory terms such as "Chinaman,". He played the villain in many of his films.

Komai emigrated to the United States in December 1907, arriving at the Port of Seattle; he lived in Seattle for several years after this initial immigration. During the Second World War, following the signing of Executive Order 9066, the actor, his wife, and their children were interned with groups of other Japanese-Americans and Japanese resident aliens at the Gila River War Relocation Center in Arizona from August 27, 1942, to November 3, 1945.

He died on 10 August 1970 at the age of 76 in Gardena, California of congestive heart failure.

== Partial filmography ==
- The Unchastened Woman (1925)
- Old Ironsides (1926) - Pirate (uncredited)
- Tell It to the Marines (1926) - Hangchow Leader (uncredited)
- Shanghai Bound (1927) - Scarface
- Streets of Shanghai (1927) - Chang Ho
- Detectives (1928) - Chin Lee
- Moran of the Marines (1928) - Sun Yat
- The Woman from Moscow (1928) - Groom
- Manchu Love (1929)
- Chinatown Nights (1929) - Woo Chung (uncredited)
- Bulldog Drummond (1929) - Chong
- Welcome Danger (1929) - Florist Henchman (uncredited)
- New York Nights (1929) - Waiter (uncredited)
- King of Jazz (1930) - Emcee, Japanese Version
- The Return of Dr. Fu Manchu (1930) - Chang (uncredited)
- The Sea Wolf (1930) - Igo, Waiter in Honky Tonk (uncredited)
- East Is West (1930) - Hop Toy
- Oriente es Occidente (1930) - Hop Toy
- The Criminal Code (1930) - Convict (uncredited)
- La mujer X (1931) - Bit Role (uncredited)
- East of Borneo (1931) - Hrang the Raftsman (uncredited)
- Daughter of the Dragon (1931) - Lao (uncredited)
- Prestige (1931) - Sergeant
- She Wanted a Millionaire (1932) - Charlie
- Border Devils (1932) - The General
- Radio Patrol (1932) - Valet (uncredited)
- The Texas Bad Man (1932) - Yat Gow
- Roar of the Dragon (1932) - Messenger on Horseback (uncredited)
- War Correspondent (1932) - Fang
- The Mask of Fu Manchu (1932) - Swordsman (uncredited)
- The Secrets of Wu Sin (1932) - Wu Sin
- The Bitter Tea of General Yen (1932) - General Yen's Messenger (uncredited)
- Island of Lost Souls (1932) - M'ling
- A Study in Scarlet (1933) - Ah Yet (uncredited)
- White Woman (1933) - Chisholm Servant (uncredited)
- Four Frightened People (1934) - Native Chief
- Now and Forever (1934) - Mr. Ling, Hotel Manager
- The Oil Raider (1934) - Chinese Cook (uncredited)
- Oil for the Lamps of China (1935) - Ho
- China Seas (1935) - Malay Pirate (uncredited)
- Without Regret (1935) - General Wu Chen (uncredited)
- Hong Kong Nights (1935) - Wong
- Escape from Devil's Island (1935) - Ah Wong (uncredited)
- Klondike Annie (1936) - Lan Fang (uncredited)
- Roaming Lady (1936) - General Fang
- The Princess Comes Across (1936) - Detective Kawati
- Isle of Fury (1936) - Kim Lee
- History Is Made at Night (1937) - SOS Radio Operator (uncredited)
- China Passage (1937) - Wong (uncredited)
- That Man's Here Again (1937) - Wong (uncredited)
- The Singing Marine (1937) - Chang
- Outlaws of the Orient (1937) - Ho-Feng's Man (uncredited)
- West of Shanghai (1937) - General Ma (uncredited)
- Torchy Blane in Chinatown (1939) - Lem Kee (uncredited)
- The Real Glory (1939) - Alipang
- The Letter (1940) - Head Boy
- Adventures of Captain Marvel (1941, Serial) - Chan Lai [Ch. 4]
- They Met in Bombay (1941) - Captain Chang's First Mate (uncredited)
- Sundown (1941) - Kuypens' Shenzi Aide (uncredited)
- Green Dolphin Street (1947) - Chinese Man (uncredited)
- Task Force (1949) - Japanese Representative (uncredited)
- Tokyo Joe (1949) - Lieutenant General 'The Butcher' Takenobu (uncredited)
- Japanese War Bride (1952) - Japanese Servant
- Alfred Hitchcock Presents (1958) (Season 3 Episode 37: "The Canary Sedan") - Old Bearded Man
- Tank Battalion (1958) - 'Egg Charlie'
- Alfred Hitchcock Presents (1959) (Season 5 Episode 12: "Specialty of the House") - Lum Fong Ho
- Tokyo After Dark (1959) - Father (uncredited)
- The Night Walker (1964) - Gardener (final film role)
