= Where Lights Are Low =

1921 film

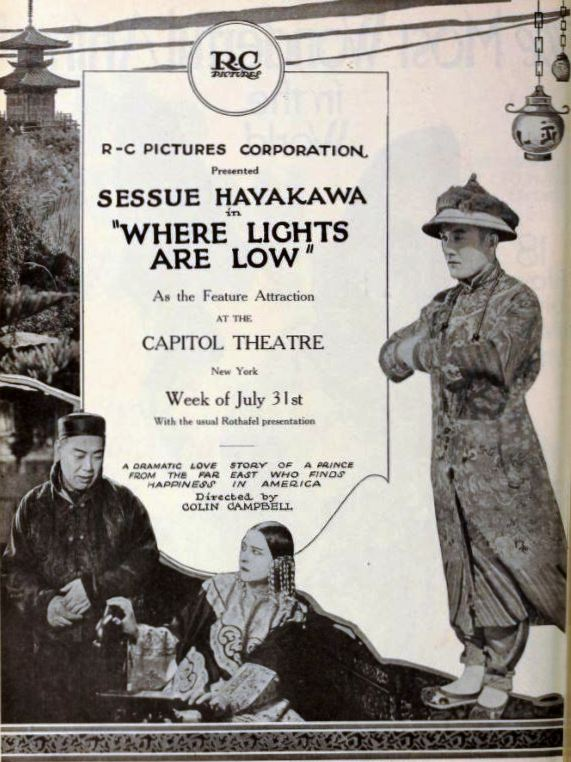
- Advertisement
- Directed by: Colin Campbell
- Written by: Jack Cunningham
- Produced by: Sessue Hayakawa
- Starring: Sessue Hayakawa; Togo Yamamoto; Goro Kino
- Cinematography: Frank D. Williams
- Production company: Haworth Studios
- Distributed by: Robertson-Cole Distributing Corporation
- Release date: September 4, 1921
- Running time: 60 minutes
- Country: United States
- Languages: Silent; English intertitles

Where Lights Are Low is a 1921 American silent drama film directed by Colin Campbell and starring Sessue Hayakawa, Tôgô Yamamoto, and Goro Kino.

== Cast ==
- Sessue Hayakawa as Tsu Wong Shih
- Tôgô Yamamoto as Chang Bong Lo
- Goro Kino as Tuang Fang
- Gloria Payton as Quan Yin
- Kiyosho Satow as Lang See Bow
- Misao Seki as Chung Wo Ho Kee
- Toyo Fujita as Wung
- Jay Eaton as 'Spud' Malone
- Harold Holland as Sergeant McConigle

== Bibliography ==
- Donald W. McCaffrey & Christopher P. Jacobs. Guide to the Silent Years of American Cinema. Greenwood Publishing, 1999. ISBN 0-313-30345-2
