= Gwendolyn Logan =

American actress

- Born: Gwendolen Beatrice Nora Logan; December 30, 1881; Bellary, British India
- Died: October 26, 1967 (aged 85); Los Angeles, California, US
- Occupation: Actress
- Spouses: Philip Hubbard (divorced): Conrad Seiler

Gwendolyn Logan was a British-born American actress and screenwriter.

== Career ==
Born in Bellary, British India, she co-wrote the 1916 British film East Is East, and the 1920 American film, A Tokyo Siren. Acting roles included an uncredited Mrs. Courtland in the 1941 version of Dr Jekyll and Mr Hyde.

== Selected filmography (writer) ==
- East Is East (1916)
- Finger Prints (1920) (short)
- A Tokyo Siren (1920)

== Selected filmography (actress) ==
- The Man from Blankley's (1930)
- Once a Lady (1931)
- We Live Again (1934)
- Dr Jekyll and Mr Hyde (1941)
- Rings on Her Fingers (1942)

== Personal life ==
She was married twice, first to screenwriter Philip Hubbard. The couple had two children but divorced in 1921. In 1924, she married writer Conrad Seiler, with whom she remained married until his death.

Logan died in Los Angeles, California, on October 26, 1967, aged 85, from undisclosed causes.
