= Harold Holland =

British actor and playwright

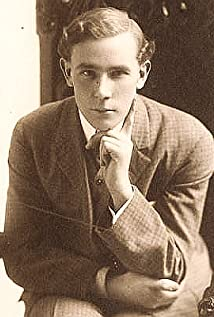
Harold Holland

Harold Holland (May 12, 1885 – September 27, 1974) was a British theatre and silent film actor and playwright. He was born in Bloomsbury, London. He played Dr. Rogers in the 1913 film Riches and Rogues, and took the lead role of Dr. Thomas "Tom" Flynn in the 1914 comedy The Lucky Vest. After having worked on Charlie Chaplin films including Shanghaied and The Bank in 1915, he was hired by the Morosco Photoplay Company in 1916 as it expanded.

Before and after working in silent films, Holland had a theatre career in the United Kingdom. His West End roles include Bella Donna, One-Act Plays, and Treasure Island. He also performed as the title character in the UK tour of Sherlock Holmes in 1919. As a playwright, he wrote the 1918 war play True Values, a propaganda piece encouraging women at home to work and invest in the war, and 1927 play The Big Drum, an early self-referential play set in a fictional theatre. Other works written by Holland include BW and Break the Sword.

His later film career, in the United States, included work in the early silent Westerns, for which he was called "a silent star", and noted roles in various films dealing with foreign ethnicity, including two roles as Irish policemen who prevent organized crime by Chinese gangs.

He died in Los Angeles in 1974.

== Filmography ==
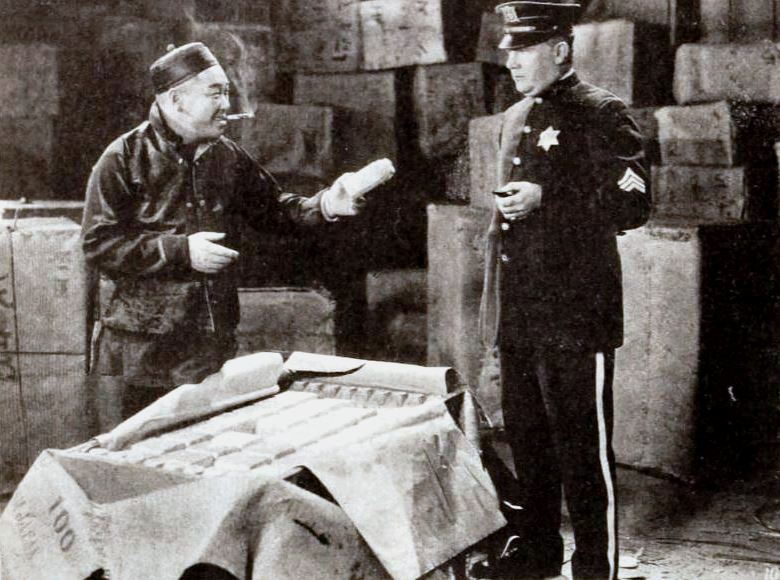
Harold Holland (right) in Where Lights Are Low

- Riches and Rogues (1913), a British and Colonial Kinematograph Company film
- The Lucky Vest (1914)
- Shanghaied (1915)
- The Bank (1915)
- Get the Boy (1916)
- The House of Lies (1916)
- Daughter Angele (1918)
- The Midnight Patrol (1918)
- Tony America (1918)
- Silk Hosiery (1920)
- Where Lights Are Low (1921)
- Black Roses (1921)
- The Spenders (1921; as Harry Holland)
- The Man Trackers (1921)
- Come on Over (1922)
- Chalk Marks (1924)
- The Call of the Klondike (1926)
