= East Is East (1916 film) =

1916 British film by Henry Edwards

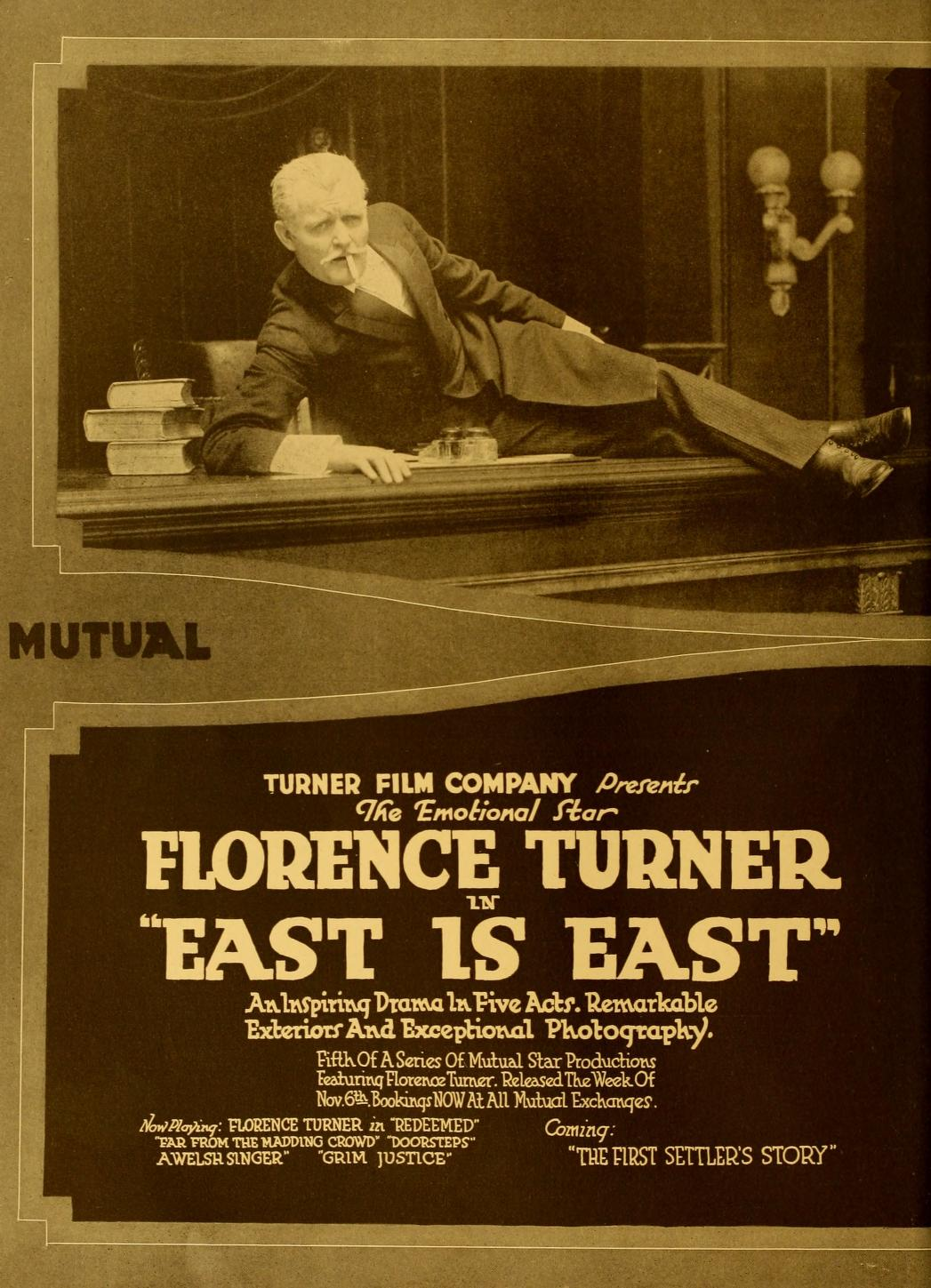
- Directed by: Henry Edwards
- Written by: Philip Hubbard (play); Gwendolyn Logan
- Produced by: Henry Edwards
- Starring: Florence Turner; Henry Edwards
- Cinematography: Tom White
- Production company: Turner Film Company
- Distributed by: Butcher's Film Service; Mutual Film (US)
- Release date: September 1916
- Running time: 80 minutes
- Country: United Kingdom
- Languages: Silent film English intertitles

East Is East is a 1916 British silent film drama directed by Henry Edwards, who also starred in the film with Florence Turner. The film is an early example of the plot premise which would prove very popular in the British silent film canon: that of a character (almost always a pretty young girl) from the working-class East End of London being suddenly thrust by circumstance into the daunting milieu of West End high society.

The full print of East Is East survives, and is well regarded by historians of British silent film. Writing for the British Film Institute, Bryony Dixon notes: "Edwards seems to have had an innate or instinctive understanding of cinema space both as an actor and director, and despite being hampered as everyone else at that early date by rather fixed sets and camera positions, he uses himself and the other actors to convey the space beyond the fourth wall, creating the illusion of a satisfyingly convincing world." She also notes: "The locations are well chosen and evocative of a bygone era, particularly the lovely scenes in the Kentish hop fields", and that Edith Evans in a very early screen role "outrageously upstages everyone at every opportunity". Although largely a serious drama, the film also includes scenes of visual humour arising from the awkward collision of East End and West End manners and habits.

== Plot ==
Victoria Vickers (Turner) lives with her aunt and uncle in Poplar and is being courted by Bert Grummett (Edwards), who aspires to one day marry Victoria and open up his own fish and chip shop. For the time being, Victoria is happy for them just to remain friends.

The Vickers family and Bert go off on their annual summer jaunt to pick hops in Kent. Unknown to them, Victoria is being desperately sought by a solicitor to pass on the good news that she has inherited a fortune from the estate of a recently deceased distant relative. There is a deadline for her to claim her bounty, but happily the solicitor tracks her down in Kent in the nick of time and rushes her back to London.

Under an unusual proviso in the will, Victoria must spend three years under the guidance of a society guardian in order to acquire the social polish and sophistication to go with her new wealth. She is sent to live with the wealthy Mrs. Carrington (Ruth Mackay) and her son, but quickly starts to find the high life more restrictive and dreary than she had bargained for. She is thrilled to receive a visit from Bert, but Mrs. Carrington is appalled by his lack of savoir faire and decides to send Victoria abroad for two years to finish her transformation away from Bert's poor influence. Before she is packed off, Victoria lends Bert a sum of money.

Victoria returns to London when the two years are up, now to all outward appearances the finished article. Bert meanwhile has used the money wisely to build up a thriving and profitable business. Now prosperous and respectable, he calls to repay the loan to Victoria, who admits that she is stifled in her new life and wishes she could return to her former East End happiness but in the circumstances does not think it possible. She subsequently accepts a surprise marriage proposal from the Carrington son.

Bert reads of Victoria's engagement in a newspaper, and is so upset that he decides to retire from active business and buys a cottage in the Kent countryside, to which he withdraws in solitude. On the night of her engagement party, Victoria overhears her fiancé telling a female acquaintance that the only reason he wants to marry her is to get his hands on her money to pay off large gambling debts. Horrified, she announces that she intends to break the engagement and give up her claim to the fortune, as she has realised that high society is not for her. She returns to Poplar to look for Bert but cannot find him. She travels to Kent, feeling nostalgic for the carefree times she spent there. She happens to pass Bert's cottage and he spots her from his window. He rushes out to her and they are reunited with the promise of a happy future together.

== Cast ==
- Florence Turner as Victoria Vickers
- Henry Edwards as Bert Grummett
- Ruth Mackay as Mrs. Carrington
- W.G. Saunders as Dawson
- Edith Evans as Aunt
