= Cammie King =

American child actress (1934–2010)

- King as Bonnie Blue Butler in Gone With the Wind (1939)
- Born: Eleanore Cammack King; August 5, 1934; Los Angeles, California, U.S.
- Died: September 1, 2010 (aged 76); Fort Bragg, California, U.S.
- Resting place: Holy Cross Cemetery, Culver City
- Occupation: Actress
- Years active: 1938–1967
- Children: 2
- Relatives: Judd Conlon (father-in-law)

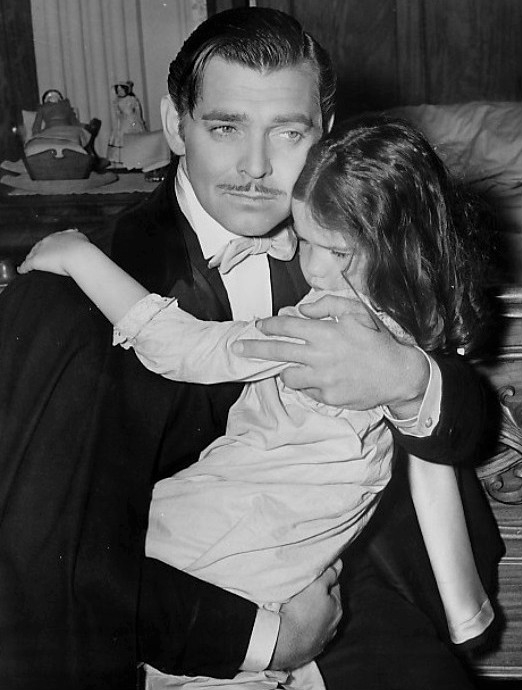
Clark Gable and Cammie King in Gone With the Wind (1939)

Eleanore Cammack King (August 5, 1934 – September 1, 2010) was an American actress and public relations officer. She is best known for her portrayal of Bonnie Blue Butler in Gone with the Wind (1939). She also provided the voice for the doe Faline as a fawn in the animated Disney film, Bambi (1942).

== Early life and family ==
King was born in Los Angeles, California, on August 5, 1934. Her parents were W. Cammack King, a chemical plant manager, and Eleanore King, a schoolteacher. Her older sister, Diane, was a child actress. Her parents divorced a few years after the filming of Gone With the Wind. Her mother then married Herbert Kalmus, co-founder of Technicolor, in 1949.

== Acting career ==
Though King's acting career only spanned a few years, she appeared in two of the biggest films of the era, Gone with the Wind and Bambi. She landed the part of Bonnie Blue Butler in Gone With the Wind at the age of four, after casting directors had tested 250 applicants for the role, including her seven-year-old sister Diane. After Diane was deemed too old for the part, she told the staff, "My sister looks like me and is only four and she can read lines". Cammie did remember her lines, but she was unable to keep her eyelids from moving during Bonnie's death scene and was fitted with a death mask. An adult male small person served as a body double for Bonnie's fall from the horse.

Cammie provided the voice of Faline as a fawn in Disney's 1942 film Bambi. According to the Los Angeles Times, she was cast in a third role in the early 1940s but broke out with chicken pox on the day filming began and was dropped from the cast list. Reflecting on her film career, she once joked, "I peaked at 5".

== Education and later career ==
King studied at Marymount High School and went on to attend the University of Southern California, graduating in 1956 with a bachelor's degree in communications. Afterwards she worked as a production assistant on Climax!, a CBS-TV anthology series.

In 1980, she moved to Northern California and had a long public-relations career that included working for the Mendocino Coast Chamber of Commerce. In the early 2000s, King made a guest appearance as a contestant on the TV game show To Tell the Truth, hosted by John O'Hurley. She spent 40 years working as a marketing coordinator for the Fort Bragg-Mendocino Coast Chamber of Commerce.

King often appeared at retrospectives with the surviving Gone With the Wind cast members. In 2009, she privately published a small book, Bonnie Blue Butler: A Gone With the Wind Memoir, mainly selling copies directly to fans via personal appearances and the internet.

== Personal life ==
She married Walter "Ned" Pollock in 1957. Together they adopted two children, Matthew and Katharine. Pollock died of cancer in 1968. She then married Michael W Conlon in 1971, and he adopted her two children. She and Conlon divorced in 1975. Her father-in-law from her second marriage, Judd Conlon, was a musical arranger for many Disney films including Alice in Wonderland (1951) and Peter Pan (1953).

King died on September 1, 2010, at her home in Fort Bragg, California, at age 76, from lung cancer.

== Filmography ==
Year	Title	Role	Notes
1939	Blondie Meets the Boss	Millie	Uncredited
1939	Gone with the Wind	Bonnie Blue Butler	
1942	Bambi	Voice of Young Faline	Uncredited
2010	Change in the Wind	Narrator	Voice
