= Misao Seki =

Japanese actor and comedian

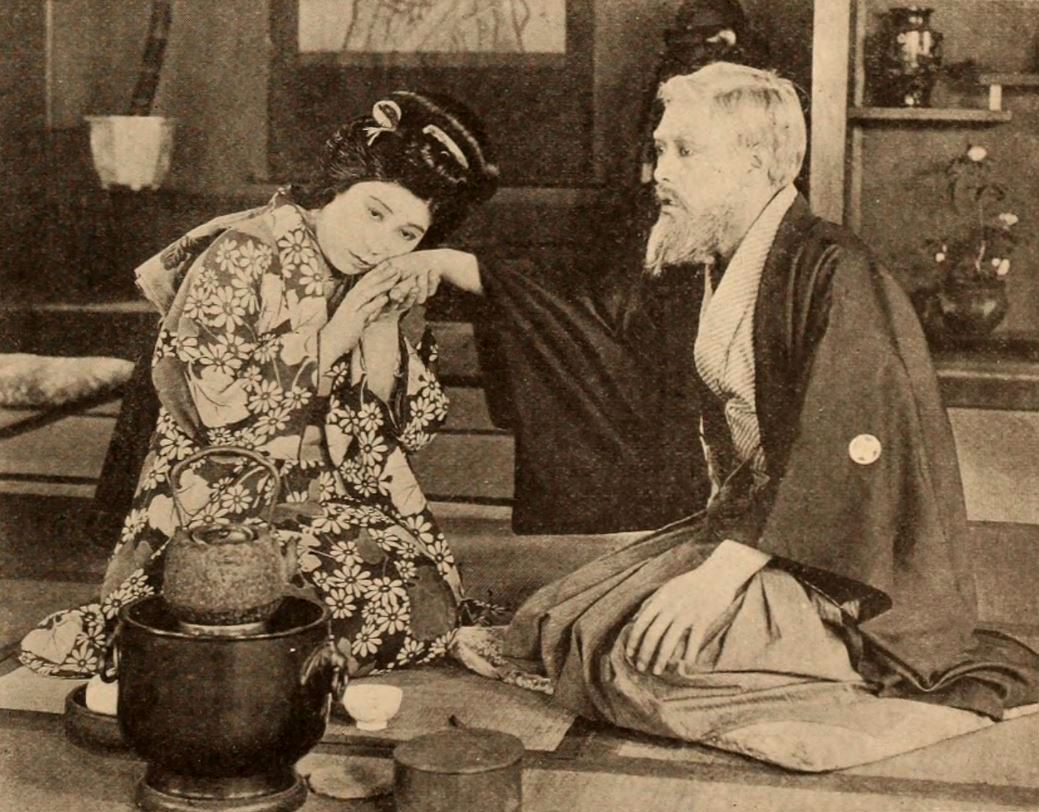
- Pictured in The Breath of the Gods
- Born: February 23, 1884; Yokohama, Japan
- Occupation: Actor
- Spouse: Saijiro Inouye

Misao Seki was a film actor and comedian who worked in Japan and Hollywood from the 1910s through the 1940s. He appeared in more than 100 films over the course of his career.

== Biography ==
Seki was reportedly born in Yokohama, Japan, into a well-known family of actors; he began acting around the age of 5. He attained a level of fame as an actor and comedian in his native country before moving briefly to the U.S. as a young man. After appearing in vaudeville shows in Seattle and San Francisco, he took on roles in a string of English-language films in Hollywood. Later in his career, he appeared mostly in Japanese films.

== Selected filmography ==
- Kaigun (1943)
- Flowers of Patriotism (1942)
- Capricious Young Man (1936)
- Mumyodô (1930)
- Nâniwa kâgamî (1930)
- Crossroads (1928)
- A Page of Madness (1926)
- Zoku Amateur Club (1923)
- The Vermilion Pencil (1922)
- Five Days to Live (1922)
- Where Lights Are Low (1921)
- The Outside Woman (1921)
- The Breath of the Gods (1920)
- Mystic Faces (1918)
- Her American Husband (1918)
