= The Texas Bad Man =

1932 film

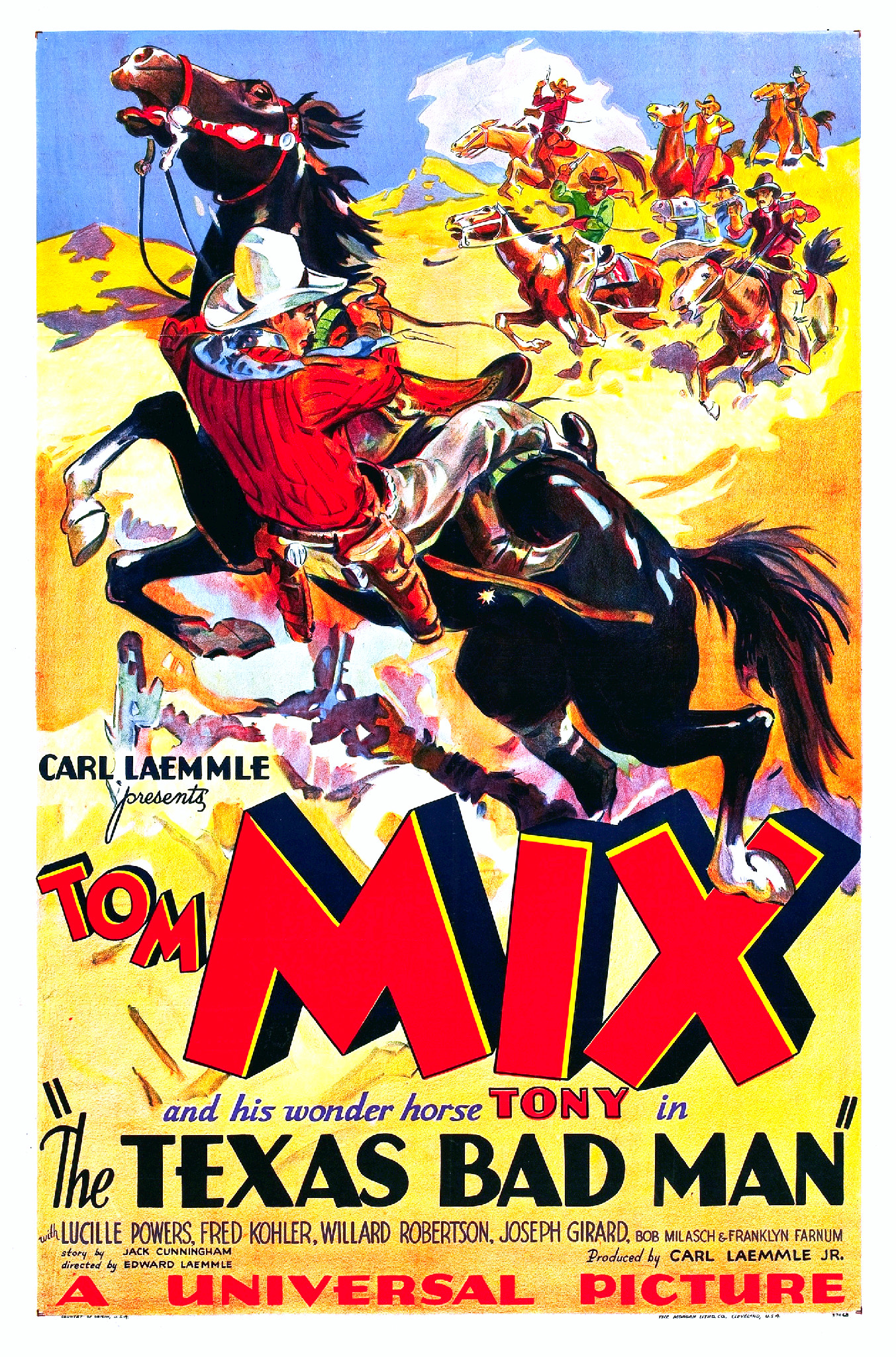
- Theatrical release poster
- Directed by: Edward Laemmle
- Screenplay by: Jack Cunningham; Richard Schayer
- Story by: Jack Cunningham
- Produced by: Carl Laemmle, Jr. Stanley Bergerman
- Starring: Tom Mix; Lucille Powers; Willard Robertson; Fred Kohler; Joseph W. Girard; Tetsu Komai
- Cinematography: Daniel B. Clark
- Edited by: Philip Cahn
- Production company: Universal Pictures
- Distributed by: Universal Pictures
- Release date: June 30, 1932
- Running time: 60 minutes
- Country: United States
- Language: English

The Texas Bad Man is a 1932-1933 American Western film directed by Edward Laemmle, written by Jack Cunningham and Richard Schayer, and starring Tom Mix, Lucille Powers, Willard Robertson, Fred Kohler, Joseph W. Girard and Tetsu Komai. It was released on June 30, 1932, by Universal Pictures. (Note: The film's copyright was renewed in 1960 under R254126)

== Plot ==
The Rangers have planted wanted posters of their man Tom Logan around hoping he can join the outlaw gang they are after. Robbing the stage ahead of the gang gets him in and he learns Keefe is the boss. When it's time for the big bank robbery Keefe puts Tom in charge but secretly tells a henchman to kill him during the holdup.

== Cast ==
- Tom Mix as Tom Logan
- Lucille Powers as Nancy Keefe
- Willard Robertson as Milton Keefe
- Fred Kohler as Gore Hampton
- Joseph W. Girard as Ranger Captain Charley Carter
- Tetsu Komai as Yat Gow
- Edward LeSaint as Banker Chester Bigelow
- Tony the Horse as Tony
