= The City of Dim Faces =

1918 film by George Melford

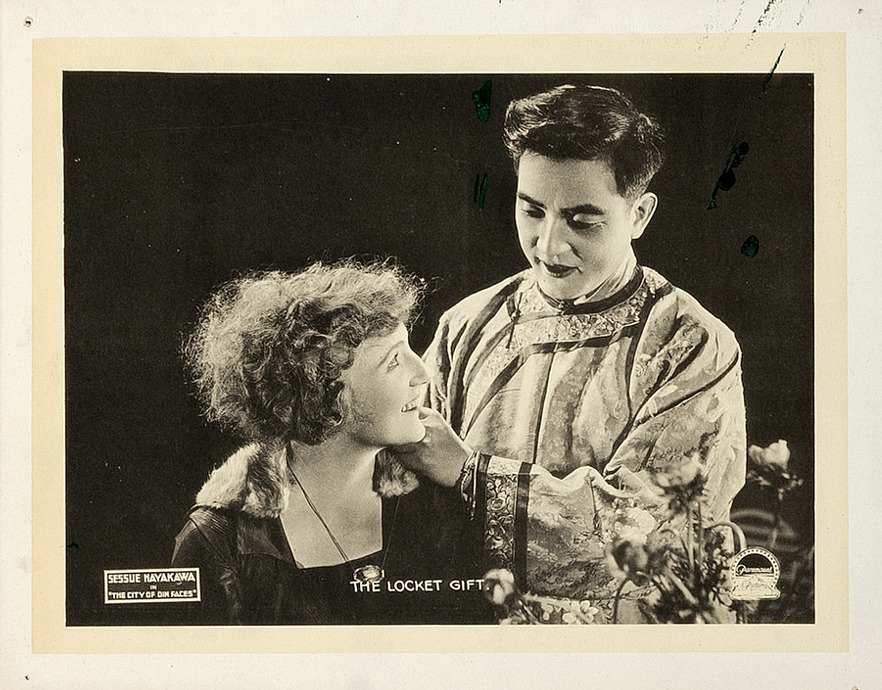
- Lobby card
- Directed by: George Melford
- Written by: Frances Marion
- Produced by: Adolph Zukor; Jesse Lasky
- Starring: Sessue Hayakawa
- Cinematography: Paul Perry
- Distributed by: Famous Players–Lasky; Paramount Pictures
- Release date: July 15, 1918
- Running time: 5 reels
- Country: USA
- Languages: Silent, English titles

The City of Dim Faces is a lost American 1918 silent film directed by George Melford and starring Sessue Hayakawa. It was produced by Famous Players–Lasky and distributed by Paramount Pictures.

== Cast ==
- Sessue Hayakawa – Jang Lung
- Doris Pawn – Marcell Matthews
- Marin Sais – Elizabeth Mendall
- James Cruze – Wing Lung
- Winter Hall – Brand Matthews
- Togo Yamamoto – Foo Sing
- James Wang – Luk Tim Eli
- George King – Lee Willie
- Larry Steers – Ben Walton
