= Flesh and Blood (1922 film) =

1922 film by Irving Cummings

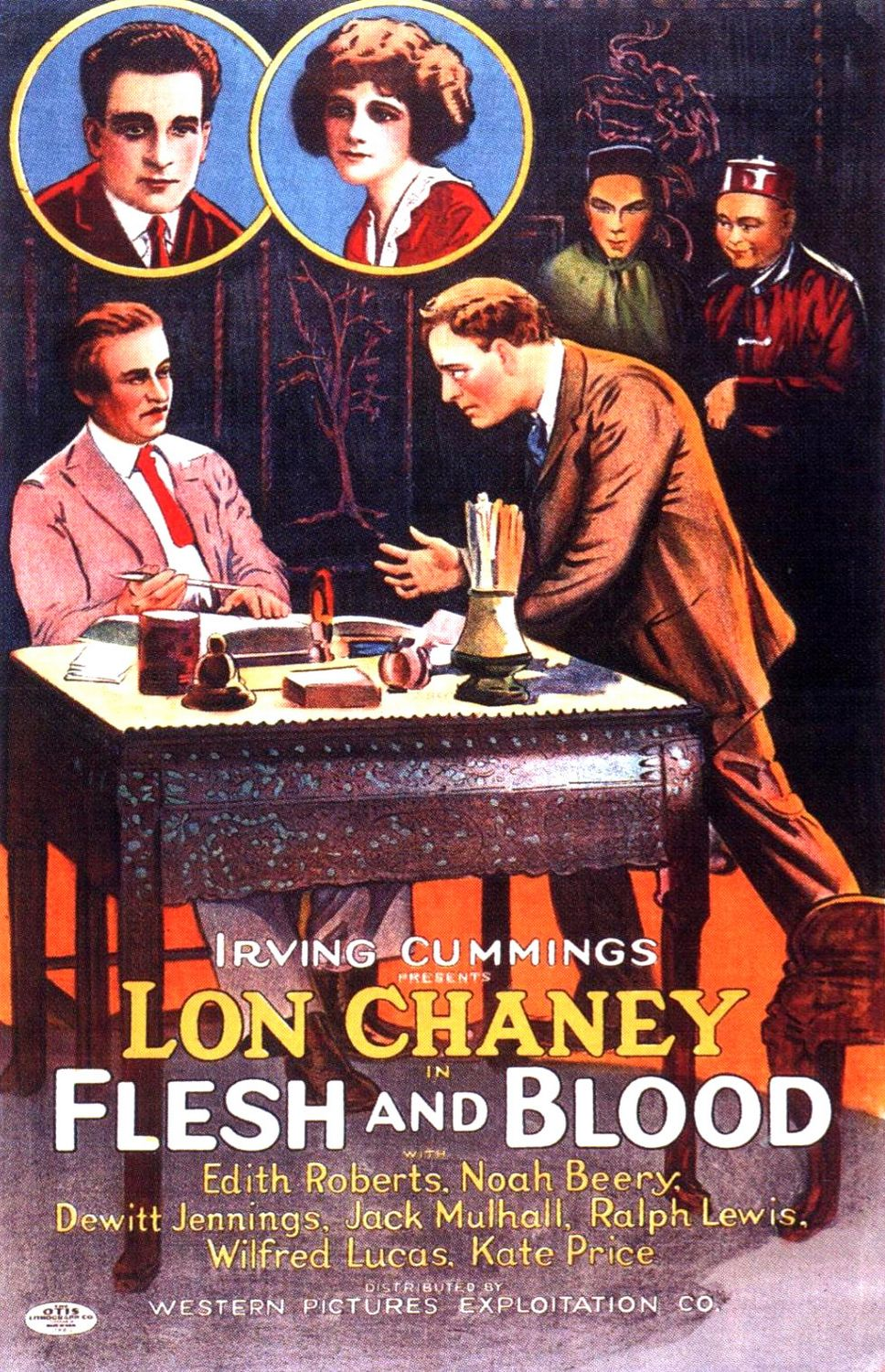
- Directed by: Irving Cummings
- Written by: Louis Duryea Lighton (story & scenario)
- Produced by: Irving Cummings
- Starring: Lon Chaney; Noah Beery
- Cinematography: Conrad Wells
- Distributed by: Western Pictures Exploitation Company
- Release date: July 1922
- Running time: 73 minutes
- Country: United States
- Language: Silent (English intertitles)

Flesh and Blood is a 1922 American silent drama film directed by Irving Cummings and starring Lon Chaney, Noah Beery, Edith Roberts and De Witt Jennings. The film originally had a color flashback scene with Chinese actors, but the color footage is no longer in any of the available prints. The film's working titles were Prison and Fires of Vengeance. Interior scenes were shot at Universal Studios.

The popular song, "Just a Song at Twilight" is featured prominently in the film, and was usually performed by the accompanists as the main musical theme for the film. Due to an oversight, the film was never properly copyrighted. The film was rereleased theatrically in 1927.

A print of the film is held at the George Eastman Museum in Rochester, New York. A still exists showing Lon Chaney visiting his daughter at the mission (see plot)

== Plot ==
Flesh and Blood (1922)

In San Francisco's Chinatown, David Webster escapes from prison, where he has been incarcerated for 15 years for a crime he never committed, to see his wife and his daughter. He plans to force Fletcher Burton, the man who framed him, to sign a confession exonerating himself. But he learns that his wife has died and his daughter now works in a local mission aiding the poor. Webster visits the girl at the mission without revealing he is her father (she thinks her father is dead) and is moved to tears by her beauty and kindness

The girl is engaged to marry the wealthy Ted Burton, the son of the crook who framed him, but Fletcher Burton has been refusing to allow the marriage to take place, thinking that Webster's daughter isn't good enough for his son. Confronting him alone in his office, Webster gets a written confession from the villain, but agrees to destroy it if Burton will allow the two young people to marry. In the end, the wedding takes place and Webster turns himself in back at the prison to finish out his sentence, satisfied that his daughter will be happy and well cared for.

== Cast ==
- Lon Chaney as David Webster
- Edith Roberts as The Angel Lady (Webster's daughter)
- Ralph Lewis as Fletcher Burton
- Jack Mulhall as Ted Burton
- Noah Beery as Li Fang
- DeWitt Jennings as Detective Doyle
- Togo Yamamoto as The Prince
- Kate Price as the Landlady
- Wilfred Lucas as the Policeman

== Critiques ==
"Lon Chaney's enviable reputation as an actor will probably be strong enough to pull 'em in to see this picture, but it is likely that many persons will consider that the story does not fill the requirements for so capable a player. In this particular play Chaney does everything that is required of him--and does it well, as do also the others of the cast--but there is not quite enough action to make the production noteworthy." ---Moving Picture World

"There is a bit of inserted action, illustrating a tale related to (Webster) by the philosophical Li Fang, which is told in color with Chinese players....There will be no complaints on the part of patrons -- they will be entirely satisfied." --- Exhibitors Trade Review

"Chaney can bring out pathos so that mawkish sentiment never intrudes. The picture is a good audience number." ---Motion Picture News (which called Chaney "one of the most gifted character actors on the screen".)

"While the story is full of incident and character, it contains very little action....(but has) some nice bits of characterization. Chaney does good work as a cripple." ---Film Daily
