= A Tale of Two Worlds =

1921 film

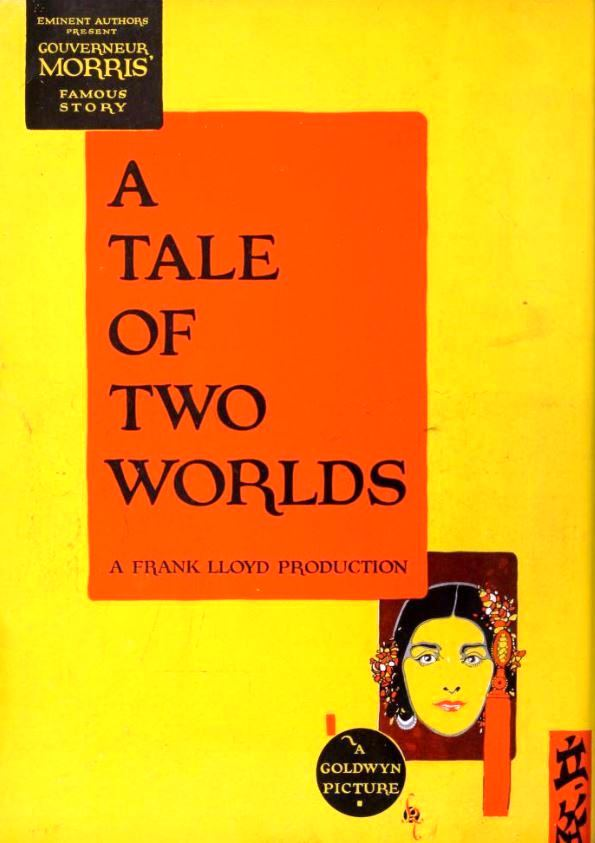
- Advertisement
- Directed by: Frank Lloyd
- Written by: Charles Kenyon; J.E. Nash
- Based on: a story by Gouverneur Morris
- Produced by: Samuel Goldwyn
- Starring: Leatrice Joy; Wallace Beery
- Cinematography: Norbert Brodine
- Distributed by: Goldwyn Pictures
- Release date: March 13, 1921
- Running time: 6 reels; 5,649 feet
- Country: United States
- Language: Silent (English intertitles)

A Tale of Two Worlds

A Tale of Two Worlds is a 1921 American silent drama film produced and distributed by Goldwyn Pictures and directed by Frank Lloyd. The film stars several well-known actors including Leatrice Joy, Wallace Beery, Edythe Chapman, and J. Frank Glendon. The film has been preserved at the Library of Congress.

== Plot ==
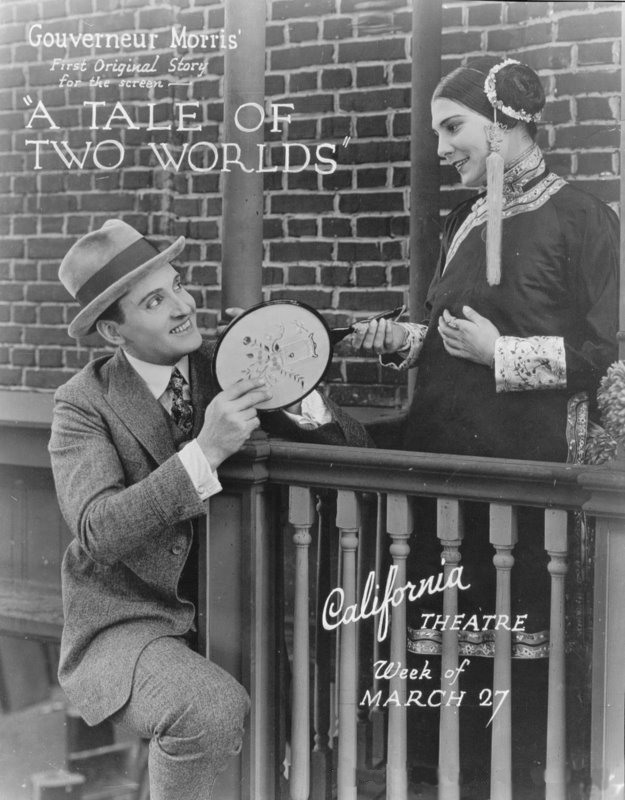
Advertisement with J. Frank Glendon and Leatrice Joy

Based upon a summary in a film publication, Ah Wing saves a white child during the Boxer Rebellion and raises her as Chinese in America as Sui Sen. Ling Jo, a tong leader and slave trader, desires Sui Sen and enters a marriage contract with Ah Wing where he will search and give the Scepter of the Mings to Ah Wing in return for the girl. Ah Wing agrees because he does not believe that the scepter can be recovered, but when it is produced, he, while heartbroken, must keep his word. The wedding day is set and Ling Jo wants Sui Sen even after being told that she is white. Robert Newcomb, a curio collector who has fallen in love with Sui Sen, and with the help of a young Chinese man called "The Worm", who also loves her, rescues her from the tong chief.

== Cast ==
- Leatrice Joy as Sui Sen
- Wallace Beery as Ling Jo
- E.A. Warren as Ah Wing
- Jack Abbe as The Worm
- J. Frank Glendon as Robert Newcomb
- Edythe Chapman as Mrs. Newcomb, mother of Robert
- Togo Yamamoto as One Eye, the Highbinder
- Arthur Soames as Doctor Newcombe
- Dwight Crittendon as Mr. Carmichael
- Irene Rich as Mrs. Carmichael
- Etta Lee as Ah Fah
- Goro Kino as The Windlass Man
- Margaret McWade as The Attendant
- Ah Wing as Servant Spy
- Louie Cheung
- Chow Young

== Censorship ==
Initially rejected in its entirety by the Kansas Board of Review, on another review, they permitted the film but required the removal of several scenes regarding the torture chamber and of Chinese girls being sold.
