= Toyo Fujita =

Japanese actor (1893–1959)

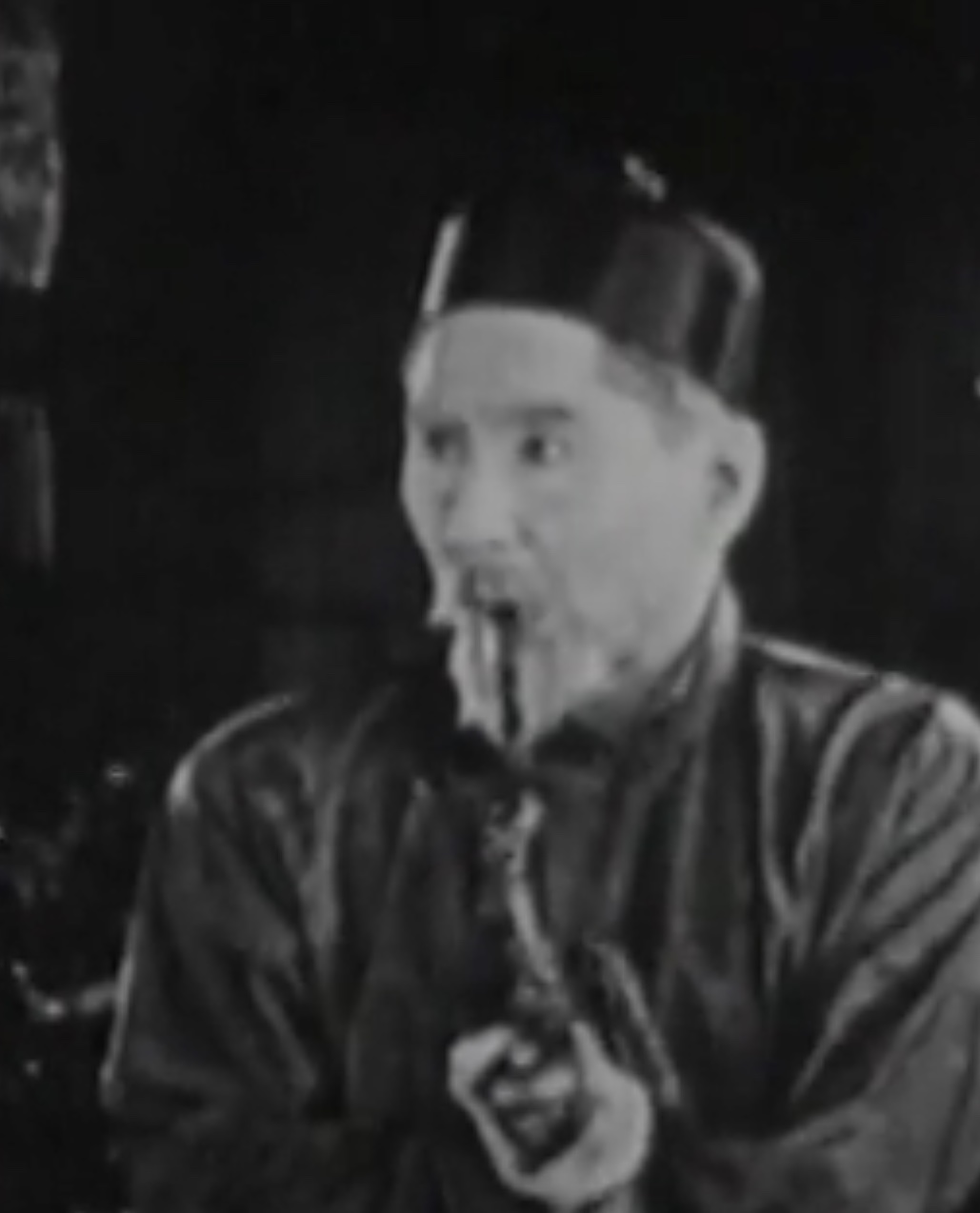
- Toyo Fujita as Louie Toy in The Tong Man
- Born: 16 July 1893; Japan
- Died: 25 July 1959 (aged 66); Santa Clara, California, USA
- Occupation: Actor

Toyo Fujita (16 July 1893 – 25 July 1959) was a Japanese actor who worked in Hollywood from the late 1910s through the mid-1930s.

== Biography ==
Toyo earned a reputation as a talented actor on the stage in Japan, and later moved to the United States, where he appeared in theatrical productions in Los Angeles and San Francisco. He later settled down in Los Angeles, where he owned and operated a theater in the city's Little Tokyo neighborhood. Apparently this is where he met Sessue Hayakawa, an actor he often worked with in Hollywood films. He told reporters he was fond of reading about pirates.

== Selected filmography ==
- The Courageous Coward (1919)
- The Dragon Painter (1919)
- Bonds of Honor (1919)
- The Illustrious Prince (1919)
- The Tong Man (1919)
- A Tokyo Siren (1920)
- Black Roses (1921)
- Where Lights Are Low (1921)
- Five Days to Live (1922)
- The Remittance Woman (1923)
- The Garden of Weeds (1924)
- Officer O'Brien (1930)
- The Return of Dr. Fu Manchu (1930)
- Kuni o mamoru mono: Nichiren (1935)
