= Pagan Love =

1920 film by Hugo Ballin

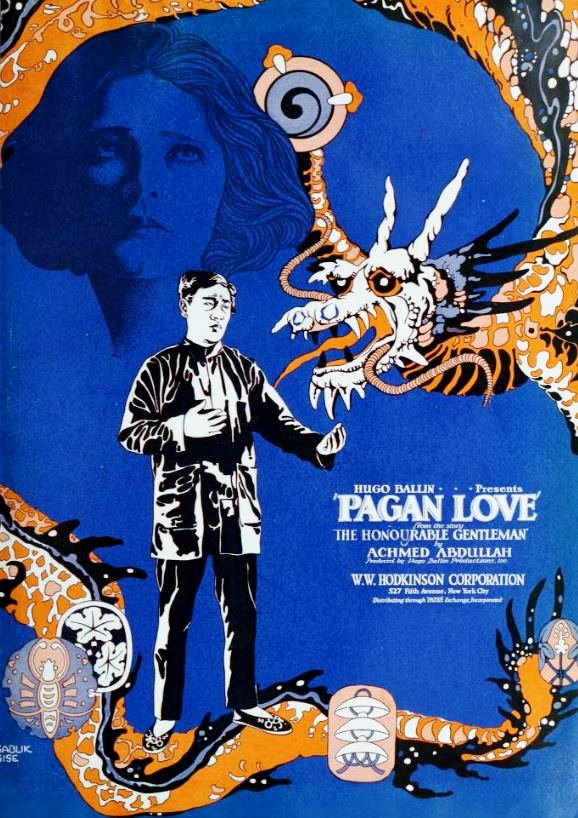
- film poster
- Directed by: Hugo Ballin
- Written by: Hugo Ballin; George S. Hellman; Achmed Abdullah
- Based on: The Honourable Gentleman by Achmed Abdullah
- Produced by: Hugo Ballin
- Starring: Mabel Ballin; Togo Yamamoto
- Cinematography: J. Roy Hunt; Harry Farrell
- Distributed by: W. W. Hodkinson Corporation; Pathé Exchange
- Release date: December 7, 1920
- Running time: 6 reels
- Country: United States
- Language: Silent (English intertitles)

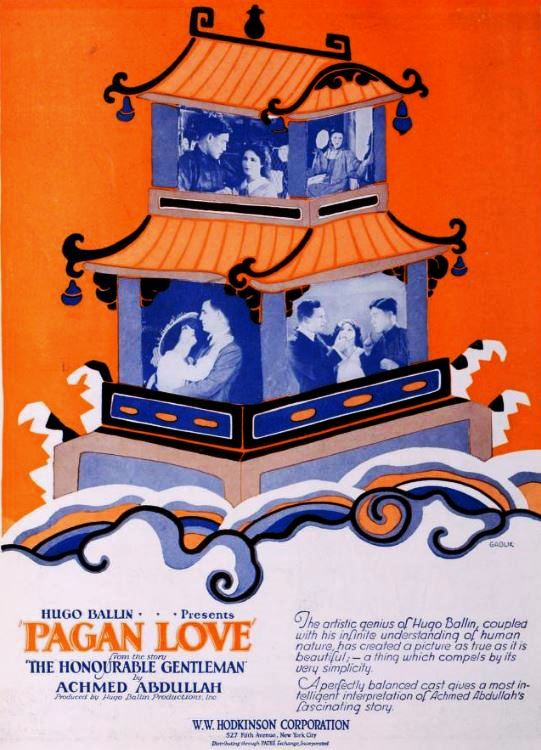
alternate poster artwork

Pagan Love is a 1920 American silent romantic drama film produced and directed by Hugo Ballin and starring his wife Mabel Ballin, Togo Yamamoto, and Rockliffe Fellowes. Its alternate title is The Honourable Gentleman, which is also the title of the short story by Achmed Abdullah that it is based on. The W. W. Hodkinson Corporation and Pathé Exchange handled the distribution.

== Cast ==
- Togo Yamamoto as Tsing Yu-Ch'ing
- Mabel Ballin as Kathleen Levinsky
- Rockliffe Fellowes as Dr. Hartwick
- Charles Fang as The Hatchetman
- Nellie Fillmore as Mrs. O'Grady

== Preservation status ==
The National Archives of Canada in Ottawa has a copy of this film.
