= The Hatchet Man =

1932 film

- Re-release film poster
- Directed by: William A. Wellman
- Written by: J. Grubb Alexander; Achmed Abdullah (play); David Belasco (play)
- Starring: Edward G. Robinson; Loretta Young
- Cinematography: Sidney Hickox
- Edited by: Owen Marks
- Music by: Bernhard Kaun
- Distributed by: Warner Bros. Pictures
- Release date: February 6, 1932
- Running time: 74 min.
- Country: United States
- Language: English
- Budget: $263,000
- Box office: $742,000

The Hatchet Man (1932) is a pre-Code film directed by William A. Wellman and starring Edward G. Robinson. Warner Bros. Pictures had purchased the David Belasco/Achmed Abdullah play The Honorable Mr. Wong about the Tong gang wars. Made during the few years before strict enforcement of the Production Code, The Hatchet Man has elements that would not be allowed later, such as adultery, narcotics, and a somewhat graphic use of a flying hatchet.

The opening crawl reads: 'San Francisco's Chinatown 15 years ago (1917) had the largest Oriental population of any colony outside China. Its 40,000 yellow residents were divided into various political factions known as Tongs, each governed by a president and council. These various Tongs were almost constantly at war, so the office of “hatchet man” was one of special importance. The honorable title of “hatchet man” was passed from father to son by inheritance only, and it was he, with the aid of his sharp axe, who dispensed the justice of the great God Buddha...'

== Plot ==
“...Our story opens following the death of Hop Li, member of the powerful Lem Sing Tong, and we see his funeral procession passing down DuPont Street”...

A huge dragon banner unfolds, declaring war. People panic: men sharpen hatchets; shops are shuttered. Wong Low Get is summoned from Sacramento to take revenge for Hop's death. He is stunned when the council president, Nog Hong Fah, tells him that Sun Yat Ming, his friend since childhood, is the guilty party. Sun is surprised and pleased to see Wong. He has prepared for his own assassination: His will leaves everything to his old friend. He also asks Wong to raise his little daughter, Toya San, and marry her when she comes of age. Wong agrees—and then reveals that he is the Lem Sing Tong hatchet man. Wong swears before the Buddha that Toya will never know “the song of sorrow.” Sun calmly kneels and prays and forgives Wong's “innocent hand its stroke of justice.”

The film portrays a changing Chinatown, where traditional conflicts between rival tongs are less prominent. Wong, a wealthy businessman, supports changes in women's roles and greater personal freedom. Nog, however, opposes these changes. On Toya's birthday, Nog expects her betrothal to take place, but learns that Wong intends to allow her to choose for herself.

Wong offers Toya his mother's ring and declares his love. He is overjoyed when she replies “My father's wish is also mine.” He kneels before the statue of Buddha, affirming his promise to bring her only happiness.

On the day of the wedding, the Bing Foo, an outlaw Tong based in Sacramento, declares war. Wong fears a nationwide conflict and the transformation of Tongs into gangsters. Nog hires bodyguards, and the handsome young gangster, Harry En Hai (Leslie Fenton) is assigned to Wong. Toya is a modern girl with a good education, and at first she gives Harry the brush off.

Wong and Toya are happy together, but threats and blackmail from Sacramento continue. Wong's devoted clerk, Chung Ho, is killed, and Wong goes to Sacramento to meet with the Bing Foo. Only Big Jim Malone, the white gangster who started the war, refuses to cooperate. Wong eliminates him, and the war ends.

Meanwhile, Harry has seduced Toya. When Wong returns, he finds them embracing passionately. She steps between Harry and Wong, and recalls his promise to make her happy, always. Wong gives Toya and her happiness to Harry, making him swear, warning that if he breaks faith Buddha will find him. Because of this “unworthy act”, Wong is stricken from the Tong's records everywhere. Shunned, he falls into poverty.

At last, Wong hears from Toya in a note, “written from a living death” in China, to tell him she loves only him. The government caught Harry selling opium, and deported both of them. Wong redeems his hatchets from pawn and heads across the Pacific to China, working as a stoker.

Toya is prisoner in an opium den/brothel, sold to Madame Si-Si by Harry. Harry sees Wong, but thinks he is a drug-induced hallucination. Toya faints when she sees him, but Wong has only love for her. He confronts Madame Si-Si and demands his wife, by ancient Chinese law and on the honor of a hatchet man. Madame SiSi scoffs; he proves it by hitting the eye of a dragon in a wall painting. Toya and Wong leave. He promises to return for Harry. On the other side of the partition, Madame Si Si shrieks at an unresponsive Harry while her servant removes the hatchet from the partition—and from Harry's skull. Harry's body falls, Cut to the statue of Buddha; Wong repeats his warning to Harry. “The great Lord Buddha will find you no matter where you are on the face of the Earth”.

== Cast ==
- Edward G. Robinson as Wong Low Get
- Loretta Young as Sun Toya San
- Dudley Digges as Nog Hong Fah
- Leslie Fenton as Harry En Hai
- Edmund Breese as Yu Chang
- Tully Marshall as Long Sen Yat
- J. Carrol Naish as Sun Yat Ming
- Charles Middleton as Lip Hop Fat
- E. Alyn Warren as Soo Lat, The Cobbler
- Edward Peil, Sr. as Bing Foo
- Otto Yamaoka as Chung Ho
- Blanche Friderici as Madame Si-Si

== Production ==
Contemporary reviews, including The New York Times, make the mistake of calling J. Carroll Naish's character “Sun Yat Sen” instead of Sun Yat Ming, a slip probably caused by familiarity with the name of the real Sun Yat Sen, one of the great leaders of modern China.

According to Naish's obituary in The New York Times, this was his first major film and the first of his many dialect roles, but he never played his own ethnicity—Irish.

Throughout the film, Music Director Leo F. Forbstein uses variations on “Poor Butterfly“, a popular song released in 1916. “Poor Butterfly” was inspired by Giacomo Puccinni's tragic opera Madama Butterfly.

The film was released in Britain as The Honourable Mr. Wong.

TCM's Brian Cady observes: “As was typical of the time, almost no Asian actors appear in the cast of a film set completely among Chinese characters. Makeup artists had noticed that audiences were more likely to reject Western actors in Asian disguise if the faces of actual Asians were in near proximity. Rather than cast the film with all Asian actors, which would have then meant no star names to attract American audiences, studios simply eliminated most of the Asian actors from the cast.”

== Reception ==
Mordaunt Hall of The New York Times described the film as a “grim melodrama...a fast-moving tale with an Oriental motif and one of its particularly effective features is the make-up of the players, not so much that of Mr. Robinson but of others, especially Dudley Digges and Loretta Young...” International Photographer commended Robinson for maintaining audience sympathy despite "the gruesomeness of his (character's) art" and described Young's makeup (though not her acting) as "an artistic triumph."

Leonard Maltin gives the picture two and a half out of four stars, calling it a “Fascinating yarn about Chinatown tongs, and Robinson's attempts to Americanize himself. Potent melodrama, once you get past obvious barrier of Caucasian cast.“

== Box office ==
According to Warner Bros. records, the film earned $491,000 in the U.S. and $251,000 elsewhere.

== See also ==
- List of American films of 1932
- Portrayal of East Asians in Hollywood
