= Little Red Decides =

1918 film by Jack Conway

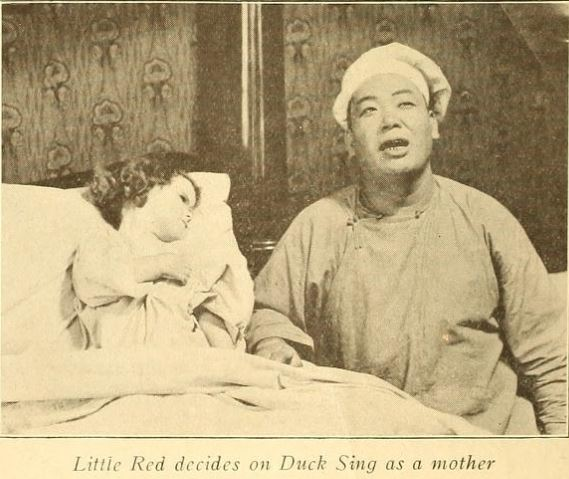
- Directed by: Jack Conway
- Written by: William M. McCoy (story); Jack Cunningham
- Starring: Frederick Vroom; Jean Hersholt; Alice Davenport
- Cinematography: Elgin Leslie
- Production company: Triangle Film Corporation
- Distributed by: Triangle Distributing
- Release date: February 24, 1918
- Running time: 5 reels
- Country: United States
- Languages: Silent; English intertitles

Little Red Decides is a 1918 American silent drama film directed by Jack Conway and starring Frederick Vroom, Jean Hersholt and Alice Davenport.

== Cast ==
- Barbara Connolly as Little Red
- Goro Kino as Duck Sing
- Frederick Vroom as Col. Ferdinand Aliso
- Jack Curtis as Tom Gilroy
- Walter Perry as Two Pair Smith
- Jean Hersholt as Sour Milk
- Frank MacQuarrie as Parson Jones
- Nellie Anderson as Mrs. Jones
- Margaret Cullington as Miss Hanly
- Alice Davenport as Widow Bolton
- Maude Handforth as Eliza Squires
- Percy Challenger as Little Doc
- George Pearce as Dr. Kirk
- Curley Baldwin as Foreman
- Betty Pearce as Miss Wattles

== Bibliography ==
- James Robert Parish & Michael R. Pitts. Film directors: a guide to their American films. Scarecrow Press, 1974.
