= The Lure of Jade =

1921 film

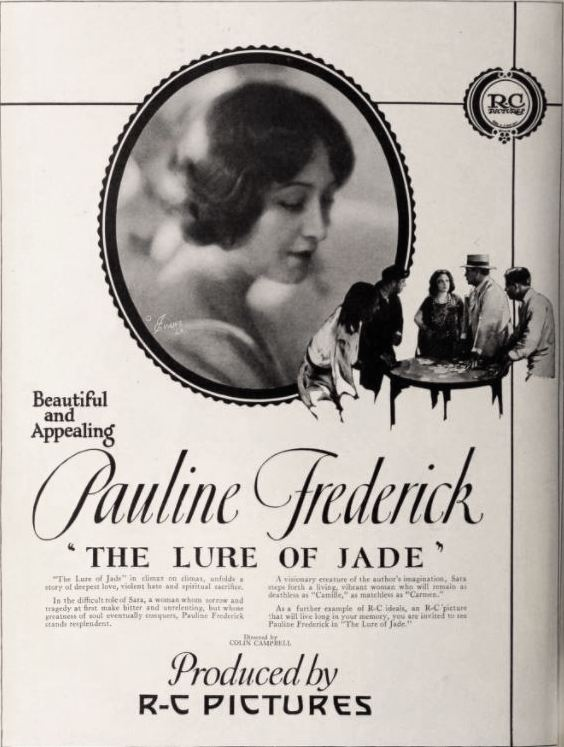
- Advertisement
- Directed by: Colin Campbell
- Written by: Marion Orth
- Starring: Pauline Frederick; Thomas Holding; Arthur Rankin
- Cinematography: Devereaux Jennings
- Production company: Robertson-Cole Pictures Corporation
- Distributed by: Robertson-Cole Distributing Corporation
- Release date: November 13, 1921
- Running time: 6 reels
- Country: United States
- Language: Silent (English intertitles)

The Lure of Jade is a 1921 American silent drama film directed by Colin Campbell and starring Pauline Frederick, Thomas Holding, and Arthur Rankin.

== Cast ==
- Pauline Frederick as Sara Vincent
- Thomas Holding as Capt. Louis Corey
- Arthur Rankin as Allan Corey
- Léon Bary as Stuart Beresford
- Hardee Kirkland as RAdm. Vincent
- Lee Shumway as Capt. Willing
- Clarissa Selwynne as Alida Corey
- Tôgô Yamamoto as Sara's servant
- Goro Kino as Willing's servant

== Bibliography ==
- Donald W. McCaffrey & Christopher P. Jacobs. Guide to the Silent Years of American Cinema. Greenwood Publishing, 1999. ISBN 0-313-30345-2
