= Something to Think About =

1920 film

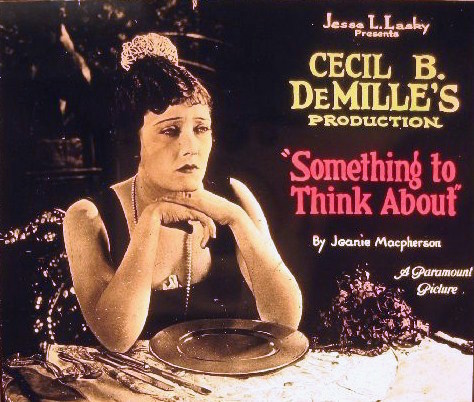
- Glass slide used to promote the film in theaters
- Directed by: Cecil B. DeMille
- Story by: Jeanie MacPherson
- Produced by: Cecil B. DeMille; Jesse L. Lasky
- Starring: Elliott Dexter
- Cinematography: Karl Struss; Alvin Wyckoff
- Edited by: Anne Bauchens
- Production company: Famous Players–Lasky / Artcraft
- Distributed by: Paramount Pictures
- Release date: October 17, 1920
- Running time: 78 minutes
- Country: United States
- Language: Silent (English intertitles)
- Budget: $169,330
- Box office: $915,848.51

Something to Think About is a 1920 American silent drama film directed by Cecil B. DeMille. The film stars Elliott Dexter and Gloria Swanson.

Art direction for the film was done by Wilfred Buckland and art titles were done by Ferdinand Burgdorff.

== Plot ==
As described in a film magazine, David Markely's affection for Ruth Anderson followed her from childhood and deepened with her womanhood. He is a young man of means but a cripple, while she is the daughter of a blacksmith. David persuades her father to allow him to have her educated. When she returns from school, the father realizes David's attitude towards Ruth and plans their marriage. Ruth, against her father's wishes, marries Jim Dirk, the young lover of her heart. A few years later Jim is killed in a subway accident. Ruth returns to her father for forgiveness but finds him blinded by the sparks from his forge and on the way to the county poorhouse. He is stubborn in his unforgiveness of her. She is about to take her own life when David rescues her, offering the protection of his name for her and the child that is about to be born to her. As his wife she eventually realizes a great love for him which he refuses to admit is anything but gratitude. The preachings of his housekeeper have an effect that brings about the reconciliation of Ruth and her father, and through the little boy Bobby he becomes a member of the happy household.

== Cast ==
- Elliott Dexter as David Markely
- Gloria Swanson as Ruth Anderson
- Monte Blue as Jim Dirk
- Theodore Roberts as Luke Anderson
- Claire McDowell as Housekeeper
- Michael D. Moore as Bobby (credited as Mickey Moore)
- Julia Faye as Banker's Daughter
- Jim Mason as Country Masher
- Togo Yamamoto as Servant
- Theodore Kosloff as Clown
- William Boyd (uncredited)

== Production notes ==
Something to Think About began filming on January 20, 1920, with a budget of $169,330. Filming completed on March 30, 1920. The film was released on October 20, 1920 and grossed a total of $915,848.51.

== Preservation ==
Complete prints of Something to Think About are held by the George Eastman Museum and the EYE Filmmuseum.
