= Goro Kino =

Japanese actor

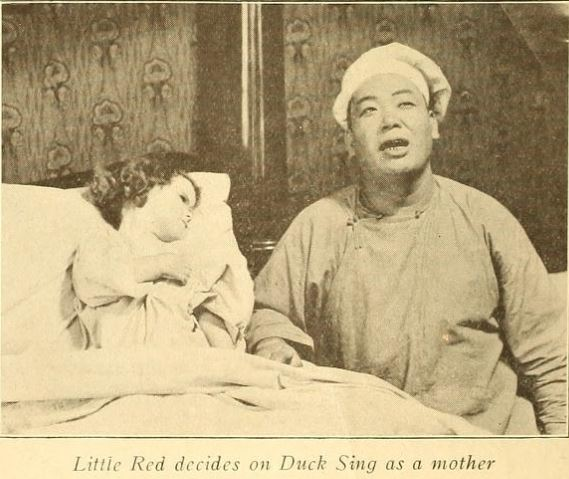
- Pictured in Little Red Decides (1918)
- Born: June 2, 1877; Tokyo, Japan
- Died: February 4, 1922 (aged 44); Los Angeles, California, United States
- Occupation: Film actor
- Spouse: Miso Kino

Goro Kino (sometimes credited as Gordo Keeno) was a Japanese actor who worked in Hollywood during the silent era. Like many of his Japanese contemporaries, in Hollywood, he was often cast as a villain.

== Biography ==
According to contemporaneous reports, Kino had already established a career for himself in Japan on the stage before moving to San Francisco to work in a stock company and eventually to Los Angeles to work in film.

He was a founding member of the Japanese Photo Players' Association alongside performers like Sessue Hayakawa and Misao Seki. One of his biggest film roles was as Duck Sing in 1918's Little Red Decides.

He said of his "evil" look in The Lure of Jade that even he was afraid to look in the mirror, and that he scared the cameramen on set; however, he was regarded as one of the nicest people in the business in real life.

Off-set, his hobbies included cultivating roses. He was married to Miso Kino, who also reportedly worked as an actress in Hollywood; she survived him when he died in 1922, but may have drowned a year later while crossing the Pacific.

== Selected filmography ==
- Yellow Men and Gold (1922)
- Five Days to Live (1922)
- Narikin (1921)
- Lotus Blossom (1921)
- The Lure of Jade (1921)
- Sanji Goto (1921)
- At the End of the World (1921)
- Where Lights Are Low (1921)
- A Tale of Two Worlds (1921)
- The First Born (1921)
- The Purple Cipher (1920)
- A Tokyo Siren (1920)
- The Midnight Patrol (1918)
- The Bravest Way (1918)
- Little Red Decides (1918)
- The Haunted Pajamas (1917)
- The Flower of Doom (1917)
- The Honorable Friend (1916)
- The Fox Woman (1915)
