= Achmed Abdullah =

American writer

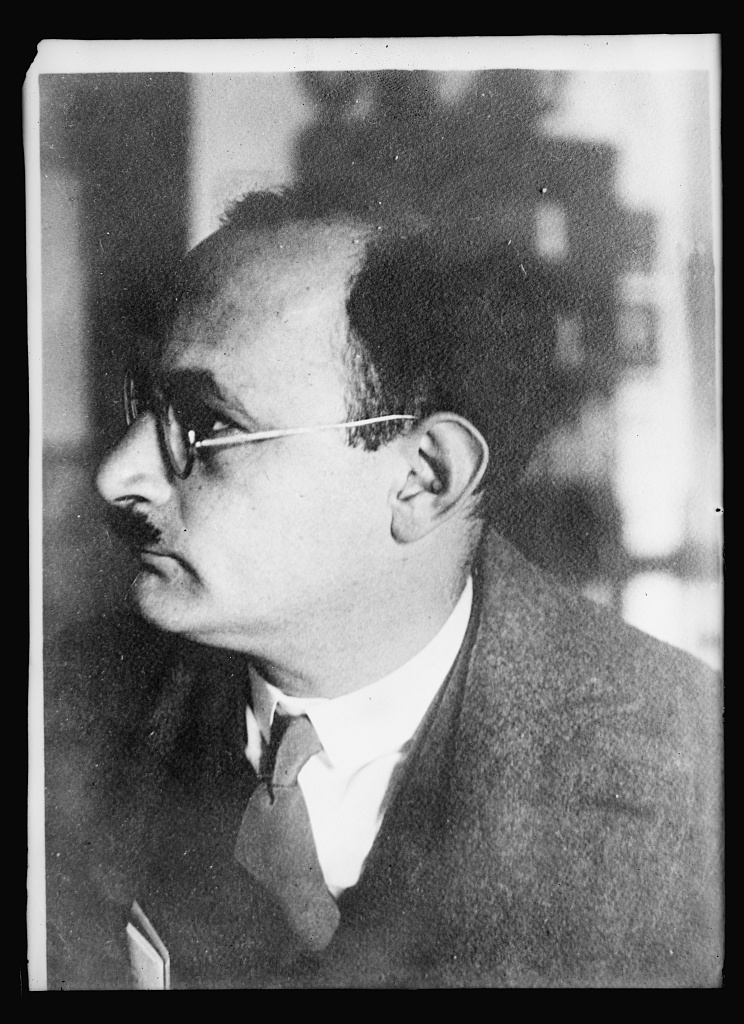
- Born: 12 May 1881
- Died: 12 May 1945
- Occupations: Screenwriter, writer
- Writing career
- Pen name: A. A. Nadir, John Hamilton
- Language: English language

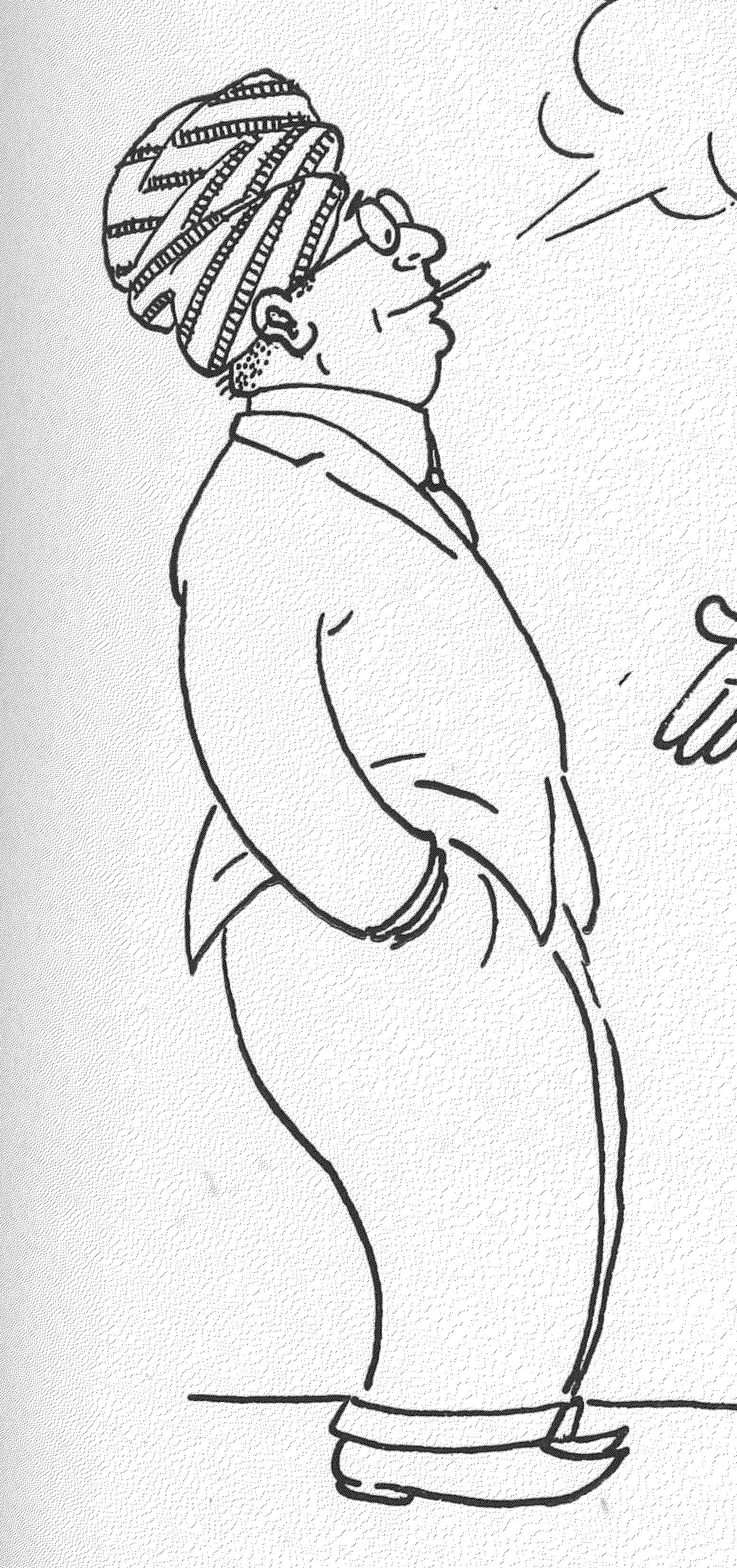
1923 caricature of Achmed Abdullah by Gene Markey

Achmed Abdullah (12 May 1881 – 12 May 1945) was an American writer apparently from Afghanistan. He gave his full name variously as "Achmed Abdullah Nadir Khan el-Durani el-Iddrissyeh" or as "Alexander Nicholayevitch Romanoff". He is most noted for his pulp stories of crime, mystery and adventure novels. He wrote screenplays for some successful films. He was the author of the progressive Siamese drama Chang: A Drama of the Wilderness, an Academy Award-nominated film made in 1927. He earned an Academy Award nomination for collaborating on the screenplay to the 1935 film The Lives of a Bengal Lancer.

== Biography ==
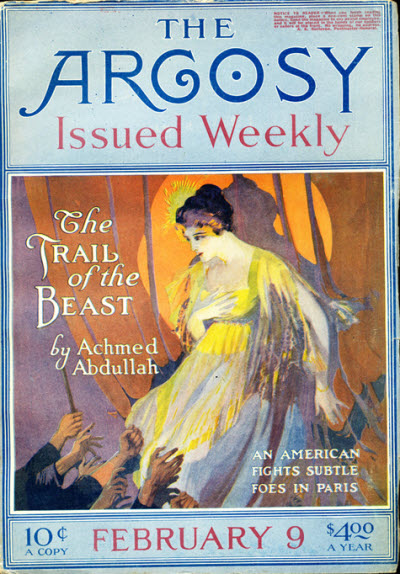
Abdullah's novel The Trail of the Beast was serialized in The Argosy in 1918

=== Self-written early biography ===
Achmed Abdullah's biography prior to coming to the US is based on his own writings and interviews, and his reminiscences in The Cat Had Nine Lives, and is not verified by independent sources.

In 1922, he claimed to a popular writer that his father had been the governor of Kabul. On the 1930 census, he declared that both his parents were born in Afghanistan. In his 1933 autobiography, he claimed that his mother was Princess Nourmahal Durani of the Durrani dynasty, a daughter of an Amir, but that his birth father was Grand Duke Nicholas Romanoff, a non-existent cousin of Czar Nicholas Romanoff, and that he was born Alexander Nicholayevitch Romanoff in Yalta, Russia. In his Social Security application, however, he gave his father's name as "Jor. D. Khan" and his mother's name as "Nurmalal Tarmarlan". Regardless, he consistently gave his birthplace as Yalta.

In various sources including his autobiography, Abdullah claimed that at the age of 12, he was sent to Eton College and then to Oxford University to be educated, though there are no records of him attending either school. He claimed that although he was born Russian Orthodox, he was raised as a Muslim by his uncle who adopted him. Abdullah claimed that he himself was a devout Catholic.

Upon his graduation, he said he joined the British Army and rose to rank of acting colonel during his 17-year military career. He claimed to have served in Afghanistan, Tibet in 1903–04 with the Younghusband Expedition. He was also deployed in Africa, China and also with the British-Indian army in India. In addition, he was also a colonel in a cavalry regiment for one year in the Turkish army as a British spy. He claimed to have mostly spent the time in the military as a spy because of his wide knowledge of Oriental and Middle Eastern customs and religions. It is said that he traveled widely in Russia, Europe, Africa, the Middle East, and China and spoke many languages and dialects. He claimed he was made a British citizen by an Act of Parliament and convicted by the Germans during the First World War for being a spy.

=== United States ===
Sometime before 1912 he emigrated to the United States and eventually became a writer and playwright, and later on, a Hollywood screenwriter. Abdullah's work appeared in several US magazines, including Argosy, All-Story Magazine, Munsey's Magazine and Blue Book. Abdullah's short story collection Wings contains several fantasy stories, which critic Mike Ashley describes as containing "some of his most effective writing".

He translated some Afghan poems, including a poem by the wife of Mohammad Afzal Khan and chaharbeiti lyrics.

Achmed Abdullah married at least three times: to Irene Bainbridge, Jean Wick, and Rosemary A. Dolan. He was the father of two daughters with Irene Bainbridge: Phyllis Abdullah (who died in childhood) and Pamelia Susan Abdullah Brower.

In January 1945, he was admitted to Columbia Presbyterian Medical Center and on May 12, his 64th birthday, he died of a heart attack.

== Bibliography ==
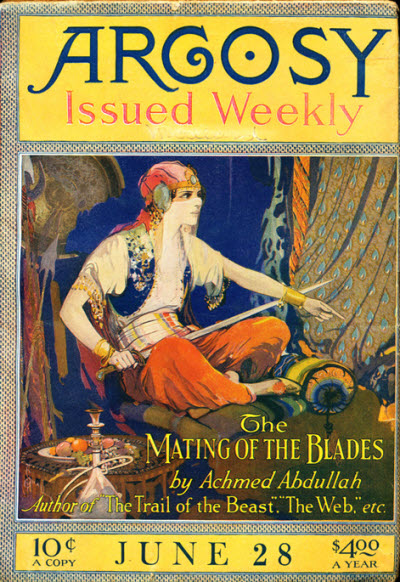
The Mating of the Blades in The Argosy (1918).

- The Red Stain (New York, Hearst's International Library Co., 1915)
- Bucking the Tiger (New York, Robert J. Shores, 1917)
- The Blue-Eyed Manchu (New York, Robert J. Shores, 1917)
- The Trail of the Beast (New York, James A. McCann, 1919)
- The Honorable Gentleman and Others (New York, G. P. Putnam's Sons, 1919)
- The Man on Horseback (New York, James A. McCann, 1919)
- Wings, Tales of the Psychic (New York, James A. McCann, 1920)
- The Ten Foot Chain; or, Can Love Survive the Shackles? (New York, Reynolds, 1920) with Max Brand, E. K. Means, and P. P. Sheehan
- The Mating of the Blades (New York, James A. McCann, 1920)
- Night Drums (New York, James A. McCann, 1921)
- Alien Souls (New York, James A. McCann, 1922)
- The Remittance-Woman (Garden City, N.Y., Garden City Pub. Co., 1924)
- The Thief of Bagdad (New York, A. L. Burt, 1924)
- Shackled (New York, Brentano's, 1924)
- The Swinging Caravan (New York, Brentano's, 1925)
- The Year of the Wood-Dragon (New York, Brentano's, 1926)
- A Wild Goose of Limerick (New York, Brentano's, 1926)
- Ruth's Rebellion (New York, George H. Doran, 1927)
- Steel and Jade (New York, George H. Doran, 1927)
- Lute and Scimitar, Being Poems and Ballads of Central Asia, Translated Out of the Afghan, the Persian, the Turkoman, the Tarantchi, the Bokharan, the Balochi, and the Tartar Tongues, Together with an Introduction and Historical and Philological Annotations (New York, Payson & Clarke, 1928)
- They Were So Young (New York, Payson & Clarke, 1929)
- Broadway Interlude (New York, Payson & Clarke, 1929) with Faith Baldwin
- Dreamers of Empire (New York, Frederick A. Stokes, 1929) with T. Compton Pakenham
- Black Tents (New York, Horace Liveright, 1930)
- The Veiled Woman, a Novel of West and East (New York, Horace Liveright, 1931)
- The Bungalow On the Roof (New York, The Mystery League, 1931)
- Girl On the Make (New York, Ray Long & Richard R. Smith, 1932) with Faith Baldwin
- A Romantic Young Man (New York, Farrar & Rinehart, 1932)
- Love Comes to Sally (New York & Chicago, A. L. Burt, 1933)
- The Cat Had Nine Lives; Adventures and Reminiscences (New York, Farrar & Rinehart, 1933)
- Fighting Through (London, Warne, 1933)
- Never Without You (New York, Farrar & Rinehart, 1934)
- Mysteries of Asia (London, Allen, 1935)
- The Flower of the Gods (New York, Green Circle Books, 1936) with Anthony Abbott (pseud. Fulton Oursler)
- For Men Only; A Cook Book (New York, G. P. Putnam's Sons, 1937) with John Kenny
- Deliver Us from Evil (New York, G. P. Putnam's Sons, 1939)

== Filmography ==
- Pagan Love (1920) (screenplay and story - "The Honourable Gentleman")
- Bucking the Tiger (1921) (story)
- The Remittance Woman (1923) (novel)
- The Thief of Bagdad (1924) (screenplay)
- Chang: A Drama of the Wilderness (1927) (titles)
- Su última noche (1931) (adaptation)
- The Hatchet Man (1932) (play "The Honorable Mr. Wong")
- The Lives of a Bengal Lancer (1935) (screenplay)
