= Natalie Kalmus =

American media executive (1878–1965)

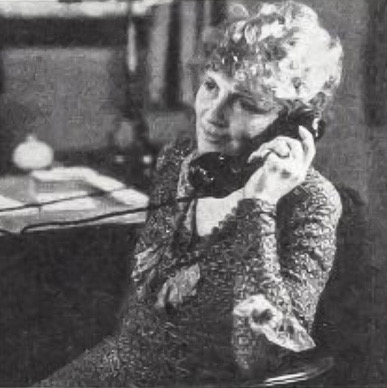
- Kalmus in 1930
- Born: Natalie Mabelle Dunfee; April 7, 1878; Houlton, Maine, U.S.
- Died: November 15, 1965 (aged 87); Boston, Massachusetts, U.S.
- Resting place: Beechwood Cemetery; Centerville, Massachusetts, U.S.
- Occupation(s): Color Art Director, Technicolor Corporation
- Spouse: Herbert Kalmus (m. 1902; div. 1922)

Natalie M. Kalmus (née Dunfee, also documented as Dunphy; April 7, 1878 – November 15, 1965) was the executive head of the Technicolor art department and credited as the director or "color consultant" of all Technicolor films produced from 1934 to 1949.

Once an art student and model, she married American scientist and engineer Herbert T. Kalmus in 1902 and later co-founded with him the Technicolor Motion Picture Corporation, serving for two decades as the company's chief on-site representative at studios that rented Technicolor's cameras for filming their color productions. Natalie Kalmus, who is often credited as a co-developer of the Technicolor process itself, was a member of the production team that shot the first Technicolor footage in 1917. Kalmus held strong views about the balanced use of color in film composition and often clashed with directors, cinematographers, and studio set designers who in her view sought to overuse dramatic colors simply as random accents in scenes, too often, gratuitously or for theatrical effect.

== "Ringmaster to the rainbow" ==
Kalmus collaborated with the art and wardrobe departments of motion-picture studios during the preparation and filming of Technicolor productions. She reviewed their costume selections, set furnishings, and lighting and then specified needed color changes and equipment adjustments to create the best visual "palette" for her company's Technicolor cameras. She and her staff also prepared color preference charts for each scene in a film. Kalmus by 1939, according to The New York Times, was earning $65,000 a year ($1,470,000 today) as an executive for Technicolor. In summarizing her duties as the company's color art director at various studios, Kalmus described her role "'as playing ringmaster to the rainbow'". Those duties also required her to work closely with principal cast during production to establish the best visual environment and emotional atmosphere to support and even enhance the actors' performances. In 1932, Photoplay feature writer Lois Shirley described for her readers the mix of psychology and technical expertise that "color scientist" Kalmus employed to get a leading actress to select an appropriate item of clothing for the Technicolor cameras:

When Fay Wray was selecting her wardrobe for Dr. X, an all-Technicolor [1932] production, Natalie Kalmus, color scientist for the Technicolor Company, suggested a robe of turquoise blue which was scientifically the best color. Fay looked ravishing—both to the naked eye and to the more delicate one of the color camera. But Fay didn't like it. She felt uncomfortable in it. She did not vibrate in it. She chose, instead, a dark-blue robe. She couldn't explain her reactions. She said, "I just feel better in it."
Natalie Kalmus knew the robe would go green for the picture. She didn't tell Fay. Although turquoise blue would be better for the shot, green would not damage the color scheme. But if Fay didn't feel right, her acting might not be right. Mrs. Kalmus knew no actress could do her best work with wrong radiations emanating from the color she was wearing.
This may sound silly to you. I can assure you that there is no star in Hollywood that thinks so, today.

=== Kalmus's color chart, 1932 ===
In addition to explaining to studio personnel the technical aspects of filming in Technicolor, Kalmus in her work analyzed and documented her observations regarding the psychological effects of color, more specifically how different colors emanate particular "vibrations" or varying levels of "radiations". When presented individually or in concert, those vibrations, according to Kalmus's extensive film experience, can evoke a predictable range of emotional responses from viewers. She, as a point of reference, composed charts with colors categorized and defined by their respective effects. Those charts provide some insight into her methodology in directing the use of the Technicolor cameras rented from her company. They also provide some understanding of her thinking in her discussions with set designers as well as in her consultations with actors, whether assisting them in choosing costumes in line with the scripted personalities of their characters or "encouraging" an actor's own "mental satisfaction" during dress rehearsals and while performing on camera. The following is a verbatim transcription of "The Significance of Color", one of the quick-reference charts "made by Natalie Kalmus" and published in the previously cited 1932 Photoplay article written by Lois Shirley:

- Blacks and dark browns. Definitely depressive.
- Gray. The lifting of sadness. A mixture of black and white. People who wear it are often in-between people.
- Red. The strongest vibration of all. A stimulant. It is sex; it is life. Many emotional people cannot wear it, because it throws them into chaos. Slow, unemotional, unimaginative people seek it to arouse emotional energy.
- Scarlet. The come-hither color. An exaggeration of red.
- Blue. It represents peace, harmony and home and definitely refines and cools. Excellent for those working at high tension.
- Green. Fresh green means life; springtime. It is both a sedative and a stimulant, depending on the person. And it is definitely the money-getting color; the indication of the ultra-ambitious; the intellect. Heavy, dull green is indicative of laziness and envy. Dull greens are splendid for the nervous, dynamic character but act almost as a sleeping potion to the slow-minded.
- Pink. Youthful joyousness. Almost all young people should have pink rooms for soft radiations while character is forming.
- Purple. Royalty; dignity; glory. Always used in religious rites and to pay homage to royalty, church dignitaries, etc. However, it is ponderous and adds weight.
- Orange. The color of physical strength. It tends to submerge all about it.
- Yellow. The highest of all. The sun. Gaiety; joy; glory; power; great love. Always stimulating. Lemon yellow, however, is soothing.
- Orchid [a rich, lighter tone of purple]. Indicative of spiritual affections and when carried to great lengths forms a barrier against love.

=== Criticism ===
Kalmus had both technical reasons and her color charts for insisting on the use of specific colors for costumes, props, and lighting during filming with Technicolor cameras. In her efforts to ensure that colors were properly registered and reproduced, she was often accused by studio personnel of going to the extreme in set composition, of insisting on too many neutral or muted colors in scenes. "A super-abundance of color is unnatural", she once observed, "and has a most unpleasant effect not only upon the eye itself, but upon the mind as well." She recommended "the judicious use of neutrals" as a "foil for color" to lend "power and interest to the touches of color in a scene." In March 1939, during the making of Gone with the Wind, producer David O. Selznick complained in a memo to the film's production manager:

[The] technicolor experts have been up to their old tricks of putting all sorts of obstacles in the way of real beauty.... We should have learned by now to take with a pound of salt much of what is said to us by the technicolor experts.... I have tried for three years now to hammer into this organization that the technicolor experts are for the purpose of guiding us technically on the [film] stock and not for the purpose of dominating the creative side of our pictures as to sets, costumes, or anything else.... If we are not going to go in for lovely combinations of set and costume and really take advantage of the full variety of colors available to us, we might just as well have made the picture in black and white. It would be a sad thing indeed if a great artist had all violent colors taken off his palette for fear that he would use them so clashingly as to make a beautiful painting impossible.

While directing the Metro-Goldwyn-Mayer musical Meet Me in St. Louis (1944), Vincente Minnelli recalled his work with Kalmus: "My juxtaposition of color had been highly praised on the stage, but I couldn't do anything right in Mrs. Kalmus's eyes."

== After Technicolor ==
Natalie Kalmus's association with Technicolor, Inc. ended in 1948 when she named the company as a co-defendant in her alimony suit against Herbert Kalmus. She sued unsuccessfully for separate maintenance, including half of her ex-husband's assets of the corporation. Two years later, embarking on a new line of business, she licensed her name for a line of designer television cabinets made by a California manufacturer. The correspondence and records relating to that and other business ventures, along with Kalmus's personal papers are preserved in the Margaret Herrick Library at the Academy of Motion Picture Arts and Sciences in Beverly Hills, California.

In 1955, the Society of Motion Picture and Television Engineers, established the Natalie M. and Herbert T. Kalmus Medal for high quality scientific contributions to filmmaking in motion picture production, post-production, and distribution services.

== Personal life and death ==
Natalie married Herbert Kalmus on July 23, 1902 in Baldwinville, Massachusetts. She studied at the University of Zurich and Queen's University in Ontario where her husband also taught physics, electro-chemistry and metallurgy and earned his doctorate. The couple "secretly" divorced June 22, 1922, but they continued to live in "separate adjoining apartments" in Hollywood into the 1940s. Despite their divorce, Natalie and Herbert continued to work together for over two decades, with most of their friends completely unaware that their marriage had ended.

Natalie Kalmus died at Roslindale General Hospital in Boston, Massachusetts on November 15, 1965. She was interred in Beechwood Cemetery in the village of Centerville, Massachusetts, on Cape Cod.
