= Herbert Kalmus =

American scientist and engineer (1881–1963)

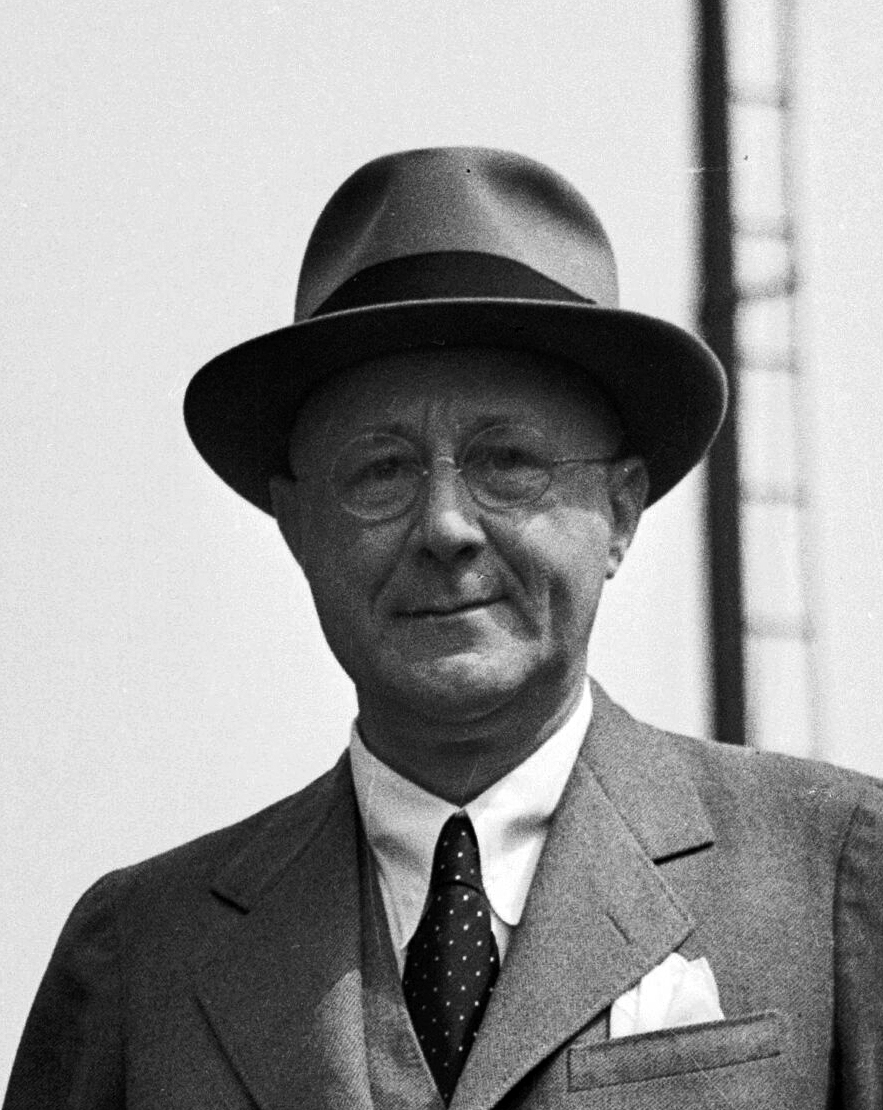
- Kalmus in 1936
- Born: Herbert Thomas Kalmus; November 9, 1881; Chelsea, Massachusetts, USA
- Died: July 11, 1963 (aged 81); Los Angeles, California, USA
- Occupations: Scientist; Engineer
- Known for: Co-founder of Technicolor; Developing color motion picture film processes
- Spouse: Natalie Dunfee (m. 1902; div. 1922)

Herbert Thomas Kalmus (November 9, 1881 – July 11, 1963) was an American scientist and engineer who played a significant role in developing color motion picture film. Kalmus was the co-founder and president of the Technicolor Motion Picture Corporation.

== Biography ==
Kalmus received a bachelor's degree from the Massachusetts Institute of Technology in 1904; the "Tech" in Technicolor is partly a tribute to that school. He earned his doctorate at the University of Zurich and was a research associate at MIT from 1908 to 1910 before teaching physics, electrochemistry and metallurgy at Queen's University, Kingston, Ontario, Canada. He was also a director of research for the Canadian government's electro-chemical laboratory.

On July 23, 1902, Kalmus married Natalie (née Dunfee or Dunphy) Kalmus, who became the color coordinator for nearly every live-action Technicolor feature released from 1934 to 1949. Although they divorced in 1922 after twenty years of marriage, they continued to live together, appearing as husband and wife, until 1944. He then married Eleanore King in 1949.

In 1912, Kalmus and fellow MIT graduate Daniel Comstock formed Kalmus, Comstock, and Wescott, an industrial research and development firm, with mechanic W. Burton Wescott, who left the company in 1921. When the firm was hired to analyze an inventor's flicker-free motion picture system, they became intrigued with the art and science of filmmaking, particularly color motion picture processes, leading to the incorporation of Technicolor in 1915. Most of Technicolor's early patents were taken out by Comstock and Wescott, while Kalmus served primarily as the company's president and chief executive officer.

In 1938, Kalmus received the Progress Medal from the Society of Motion Picture and Television Engineers, and in 1939, the Motion Picture Academy awarded him a special Oscar for color development. In 1952, he received their Samuel L. Warner memorial award, "for Technicolor's perfection of the imbibition process for 16mm color prints and for the techniques of making separate sound negatives for mass production by the 35mm/32mm method for excellence of 16mm sound", however it was "accepted on his behalf by Mr. Wadsworth Pohl, his associate." He was made an honorary life member of the SMPTE. He also received an award from the US Office of Scientific Research and Development.

He was a director at Stanford Research Institute.

He had two daughters. Kalmus' god-daughter (and later step-daughter), Cammie King, played the part of Bonnie Blue Butler in the film Gone With the Wind (1939). The autobiography of Herbert Kalmus, Mr. Technicolor (ISBN 1882127315), was published in 1993.

== Legacy ==
- Kalmus has a star on the Walk of Fame in Hollywood, California.
- Kalmus Beach in Hyannis, Massachusetts, is named after him.
- In 1955, the Society of Motion Picture and Television Engineers, established the Natalie M. and Herbert T. Kalmus Medal for high quality scientific contributions to filmmaking in motion picture production, post-production, and distribution services.
