= Alimony (disambiguation) =

Alimony is a legal obligation on a person to provide financial support to his or her spouse before or after marital separation or divorce.

Alimony may also refer to:

- Alimony in the United States
- Alimony (1917 film), American silent drama film
- Alimony (1924 film), American silent drama film
- Alimony (1949 film), American crime film
- "Alimony", a song by "Weird Al" Yankovic from the album Even Worse

== See also ==
- Child support, an ongoing, periodic payment made by a parent for the financial benefit of a child following the end of a marriage or other relationship
- Aliment, an allowance for maintenance; alimony under Scots law
