= Derelys Perdue =

American actress (1902–1989)

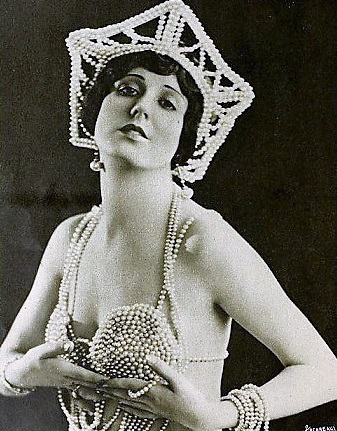
- Perdue in 1923
- Born: Geraldine Perdue; March 22, 1902; Kansas City, Missouri, U.S.
- Died: September 30, 1989 (aged 87); Los Angeles, California, U.S.
- Occupations: Actress; dancer
- Years active: 1908–1929

Derelys Perdue (born Geraldine Perdue; March 22, 1902 – September 30, 1989) was an American silent-film actress and popular dancer during the 1920s.

== Biography ==
Born Geraldine Perdue in Kansas City, Missouri, following high school, she attended a private school for girls. Standing 5' 2.5", she began her career as a dancer (she had been dancing since the age of six), gaining much popularity. She first received attention in Hollywood during a stage production entitled Attila and the Huns, with Ramón Novarro playing Attila and Perdue playing one of the Huns. Perdue went on to appear as a dancer with Novarro in the 1921 film A Small Town Idol. Her first film credit was the 1923 film Daytime Wives. She was named one of the WAMPAS Baby Stars that year.

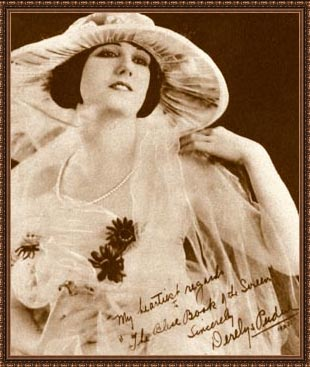
Derelys Perdue in 1923

Perdue reportedly got on poorly with fellow actress Grace Darmond, with whom she starred in A Dangerous Adventure (1922). It was later told that the two women were actually fighting it out for real in several scenes, nearly pulling each other's hair out.

However, she still went on to appear in many more films, including the 1924 film The Last Man on Earth. She later played Mrs. Newlywed in The Newlyweds film series of short comedies in 1928 and 1929. Soon enough, though, Perdue's career was beginning to fall apart. Her boss, future presidential father Joseph P. Kennedy, insisted that she change her name to Ann Perdue, a more sensible name compared to Derelys. She sued him, but lost, and her film career ended in 1929.

The suit was brought against Film Booking Inc. Distributing Agency for Robertson-Cole Photoplays in April 1923. Movie distributors had conducted a contest in a picture magazine asking fans to suggest a name for Miss Perdue. Her last film was The Smiling Terror (1929), a low-budget western.

Throughout her career, she was especially noted for her great talent for dancing in her films. She even organized dancing episodes in several films. She also performed solo or in group at a variety of locations in Los Angeles.

== Personal life ==
She was divorced from Louis M. Feldman in Los Angeles, California in November 1926.

== Death ==
Derelys Perdue died in 1989 in Los Angeles, California, aged 87.

== Partial filmography ==
- Man, Woman & Marriage (1921)
- A Small Town Idol (1921)
- A Dangerous Adventure (1922)
- The Bishop of the Ozarks (1923)
- Daytime Wives (1923)
- Blow Your Own Horn (1923)
- Untamed Youth (1924)
- The Last Man on Earth (1924)
- Paint and Powder (1925)
- Where the Worst Begins (1925)
- The Gingham Girl (1927)
- The Mystery Rider (1928)
- Quick Triggers (1928)
- The Smiling Terror (1929)

== Sources ==
- The Fresno, California Bee, Change of Name Results In Suit, Monday, April 23, 1923, Page 12.
- The Los Angeles Times, Rivals Are Neck and Neck, March 16, 1923, Page II 1.
- Oakland, California Tribune, Movieland, Sunday, November 7, 1926, Page W-3.
