= Blow Your Own Horn =

Blow Your Own Horn may refer to:

- A 1983 album by Herb Alpert
- Blow Your Own Horn (film), a 1923 film
