= The Devil's Pass Key =

1920 film by Erich von Stroheim

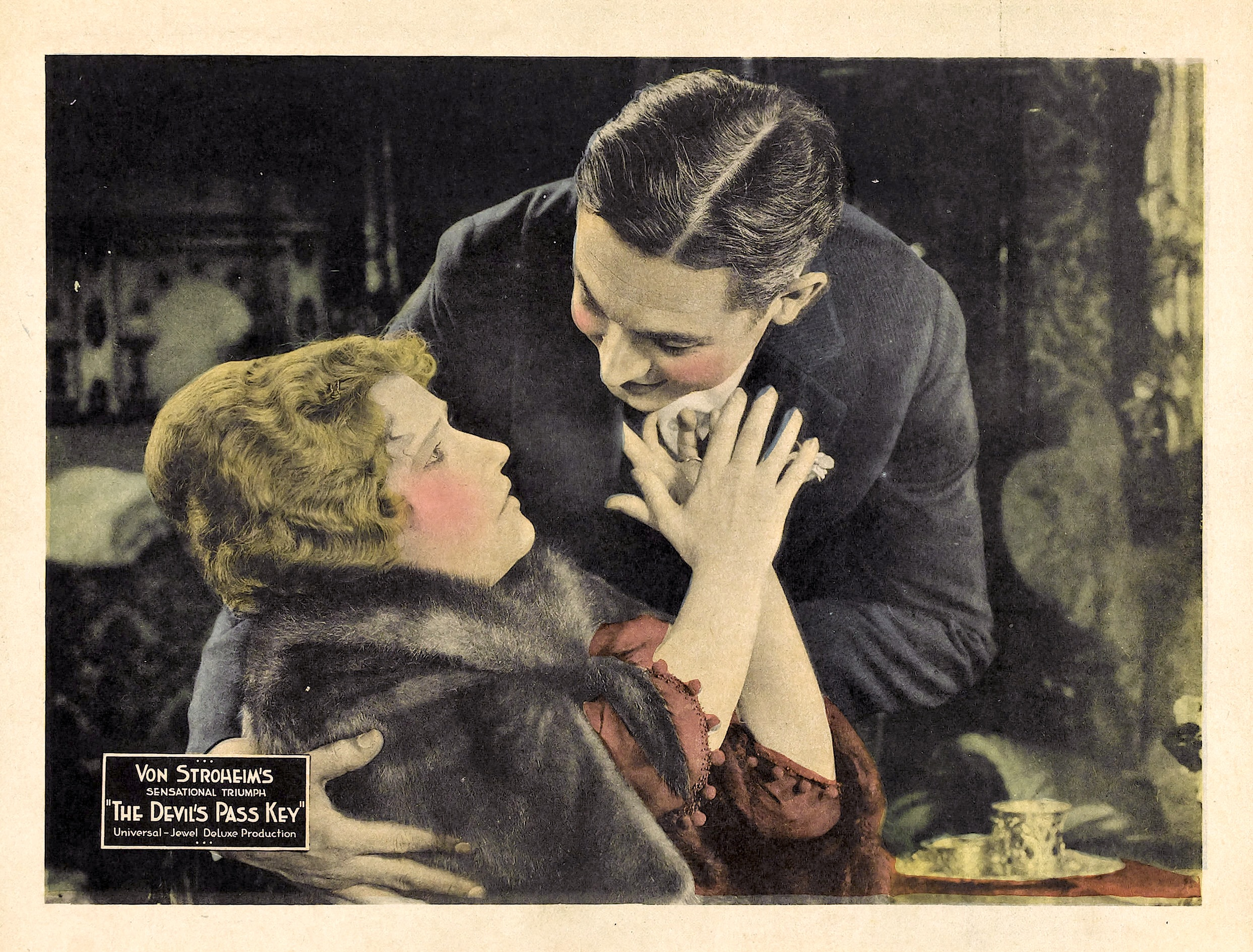
- lobby card
- Directed by: Erich von Stroheim
- Screenplay by: Erich von Stroheim
- Story by: "Clothes and Treachery" by Baroness Olga de Meyer
- Produced by: Carl Laemmle
- Starring: Sam de Grasse; Mae Busch; Maude George; Leo White
- Cinematography: Ben F. Reynolds; William H. Daniels; Howard Oswald
- Edited by: Jeanne Spencer; Grant Whytock
- Production company: Jewel Productions
- Distributed by: Universal Film Manufacturing Company
- Release date: August 30, 1920
- Running time: 130 minutes (original cut); 80 minutes (original release)
- Country: United States
- Language: Silent (English intertitles)
- Budget: $185,000

The Devil's Pass Key (or The Devil's Passkey) is a 1920 silent drama film directed by Erich von Stroheim. Considered a “lost film”, no print is officially known to exist.

The film was produced by Universal Pictures and distributed under its prestigious Jewel banner, later calling it "One of the best photodramatic productions of the year". The production was shot from September 1919 through December 1919 and premiered on August 8, 1920, at the Capitol Theatre in New York City, New York.

== Plot ==
As a lost film, the plot summary for The Devil's Pass Key is based on contemporary descriptions or reconstructed from archival material, including “continuities” from Universal studio archives. The original story purchased from Baroness de Meyer by the studio is no longer extant. The following synopsis of the film was offered in a contemporary film magazine, Exhibitor's Herald.

Grace Goodright is the beautiful but extravagant wife of Warren Goodright, an American playwright living in Paris. Grace is living beyond her means and owes her modeste Renee Malot money. Malot suggests that Grace contact a wealthy American, army officer Captain Rex Strong, who might be able to assist her financially. Rex offers Grace a loan, but only if as "security" for the loan she grants him sexual favors. Grace refuses, and Malot, angered at losing an opportunity for obtaining a commission for the loan, attempts to trap Grace in a blackmail scheme. The newspapers print the spicy bit of scandal without mentioning any names. Warren uses the story as the plot for his next play and it meets success. Paris is thrown into a furor over the affair and Warren threatens the life of Captain Strong. After the latter convinces Warren that his wife is innocent, the matter is resolved happily.

== Cast ==
- Sam de Grasse as Warren Goodright
- Mae Busch as La Belle Odera
- Maude George as Renee Malot
- Leo White as Amadeus Malot
- Jack Mathis as Count De Trouvere
- Al Edmundson as Alphonse Marior
- Una Trevelyn as Grace Goodright
- Clyde Fillmore as Captain Rex Strong
- Ruth King as Yvonne Strong
- Edward Reinach as Director of Theatre Français

== Pre-Production ==
The Devil's Pass Key is based on a story by Baroness Olga de Meyer entitled “Clothes and Treachery.” The only child of the Neapolitan Duke of Caracciolo, and the god-daughter of Edward VII (and rumored to be the king's biological offspring), she and her husband Adolph de Meyer mingled with European high-society. It is unclear whether von Stroheim had directly solicited the story from the literary Baroness, or whether the story, purchased by Universal for $750, was then assigned to the director by studio executives. Von Stroheim wrote the screenplay, completing it on 19 October 1919.

== Production ==
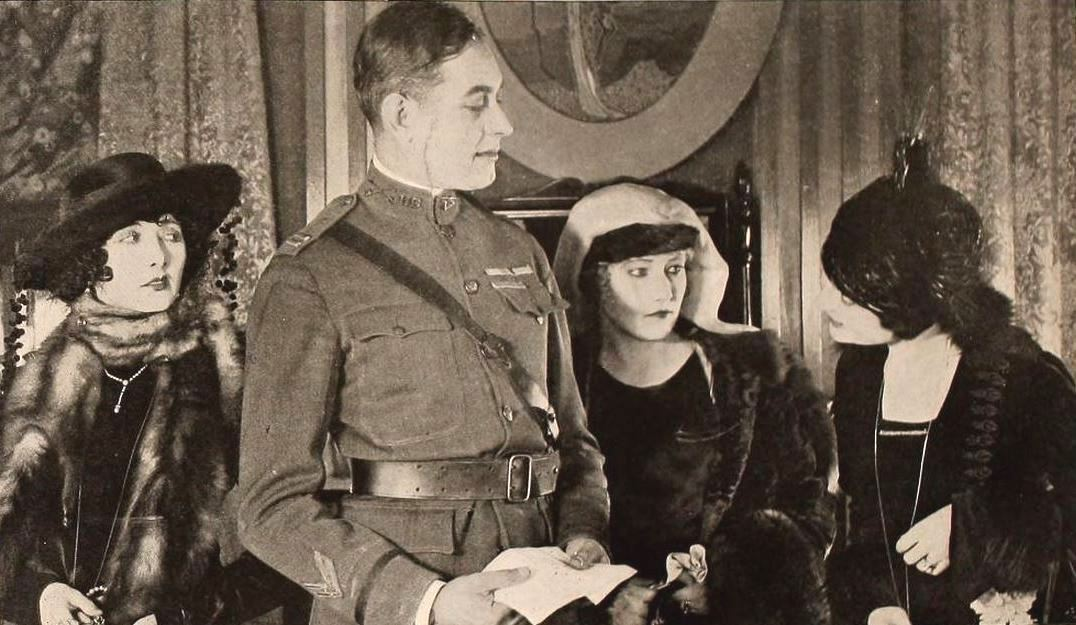
The Devil's Pass Key publicity still. L to R: Mae Busch, Clyde Fillmore, Una Trevelyn, and Maude George.

The cast for The Devil’s Pass Key was assembled from vaudeville and musical comedy personnel reflecting von Stroheim's predilection for naturalistic acting and his antipathy towards stage-trained performers. Actor Sam de Grasse, now a von Stroheim cast regular, was joined by Mae Busch, Maude George and Clyde Fillmore to play the leads in the film.

Von Stroheim shot his film “in sequence” allowing the cast to discover and develop their characters. He personally “acted out each part for each player”, fully entering into the dramatization so as to elicit “realistic” performances from his cast.

Shooting for The Devil’s Pass Key ended on 4 December 1919 and marked the beginning of a protracted editing process that took nearly five months to complete. The immense amount of footage was a product of von Stroheim's “habit of shooting dozens of takes in the hope of making a magical selection in the cutting room.” In terms of its length, The Devil’s Pass Key measured approximately 7500 feet; the finished film totaled a modest running time of about two hours, suggesting none of the profligacy in the duration that characterized subsequent von Stroheim films, first manifested in his Foolish Wives (1922). Despite these delays in editing, The Devil’s Pass Key was completed with notable “efficiency and dispatch.”

The final print was shipped to New York on 4 April 1920 for press screening and to arrange for booking by Universal's sales department. The film would be premiered on 8 August at New York's Capitol Theater.

== Critical response ==
In order to entice critical and popular anticipation for The Devil’s Pass Key, producer Carl Laemmle delayed release of the picture. In June 1920 von Stroheim was in New York City giving press interviews to enhance his growing popularity as a Hollywood director. Universal was particularly eager to promote von Stroheim's success in creating cinematic “spectacle and verisimilitude” and to link his personal idiosyncrasies to this phenomenon.

Following upon von Stroheim's successful 1919 debut feature, Blind Husbands, The Devil’s Pass Key “cemented [his] reputation as among the finest of American directors.” Based on its critical and commercial approval, von Stroheim was positioned to begin his next, and far more ambitious project, Foolish Wives.

Film historian Richard Koszarski reports “a surprising dearth of contemporary references to the film, this despite the fact that what references do exist are among von Stroheim’s best. Because this film has been lost for so long, historians often omit it when discussing or writing about the canon of von Stroheim's film work.

== Preservation status ==
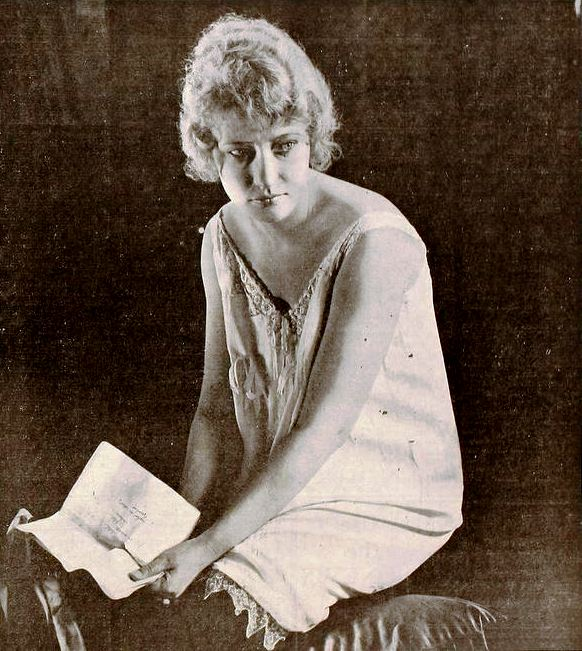
Una Trevelyn in the production.

The Devil’s Pass Key has officially been designated as a “lost film” and registered as such by Universal Studios archive facility records. Historian Richard Koszarski reported in 1983 that Universal's Woodbridge, New Jersey unit possessed a fragile nitrate negative of the film, a reel of which was largely decomposed. The following year the entire negative was destroyed, according to Universal records.

Tantalizing reports that the picture survives in private collections persist. A story in The Hollywood Reporter, international edition, dated November 12, 1993, stated that this film would be shown at the 1994 Berlin Film Festival — a film previously thought to be lost. As of July 2015, the validity of this has not yet been proven. As recently as 2019, film historian Kevin Brownlow stated that the Cinemateca de Cuba in Havana owned a print of the film.

== See also ==
- List of lost films

== Sources ==
- "Exhibitors Herald (Apr-Jun 1920)". Exhibitor's Herald. Vol. April–June, 1920. June 1920 – via Internet Archive.
- "The Devil's Pass Key" (PDF). The New York Times. August 9, 1920.
- "Noticed and Noted" (PDF). The New York Times. September 5, 1920.
- "Screen: People and Plays" (PDF). The New York Times. January 2, 1921.
- Koszarski, Richard (1983). The Man You Loved to Hate: Erich von Stroheim and Hollywood. Oxford University Press. ISBN 0-19-503239-X.
- Silent Era (2020). "The Devil's Pass Key". Progressive Silent Film List.
