= A City Sparrow =

1920 film

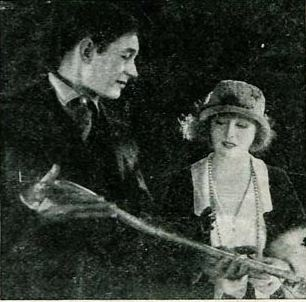
- Still with Clyde Fillmore and Ethel Clayton
- Directed by: Sam Wood
- Screenplay by: Kate Jordan; Clara Genevieve Kennedy
- Produced by: Jesse L. Lasky
- Starring: Ethel Clayton; Walter Hiers; Clyde Fillmore; Lillian Leighton; William Boyd; Rose Cade
- Cinematography: Alfred Gilks
- Production company: Famous Players–Lasky Corporation
- Distributed by: Paramount Pictures
- Release date: October 17, 1920
- Running time: 50 minutes
- Country: United States
- Language: Silent (English intertitles)

A City Sparrow is a 1920 American silent drama film directed by Sam Wood and written by Kate Jordan and Clara Genevieve Kennedy. The film stars Ethel Clayton, Walter Hiers, Clyde Fillmore, Lillian Leighton, William Boyd, and Rose Cade. The film was released on October 17, 1920, by Paramount Pictures.

== Plot ==
As summarized in a film magazine, Milly West, a cabaret dancer becomes injured, and after a surgeon says she cannot become a mother, she gives up on love. Tim loves her and after she rejects him, writes his mother in the country that he has killed himself. David, a man from the country, takes her there to recover and later wins her over.

The magazine also used stills to illustrate the plot:

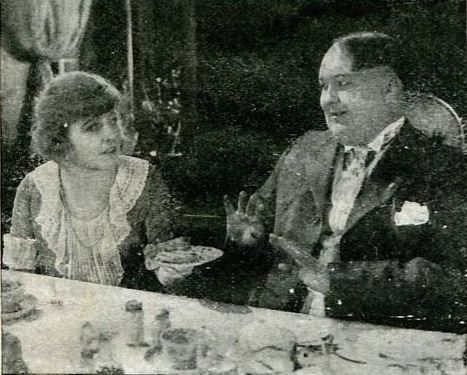
Milly, a cabaret dancer, offers Tim her pie at a theatrical boarding house

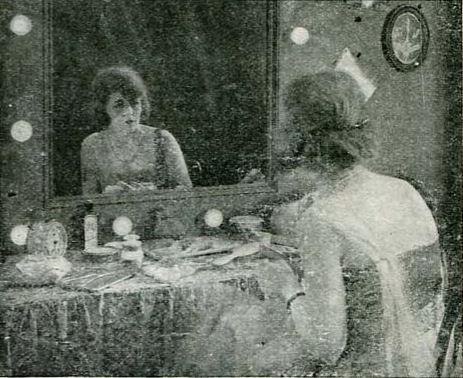
In her dressing room, Milly muses over the seriousness of the surgeon's decree

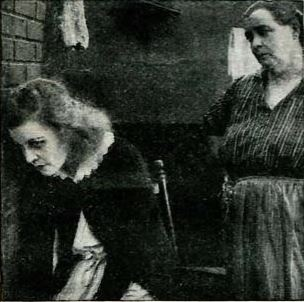
Too weak to continue her dancing act, Milly is compelled to leave the stage

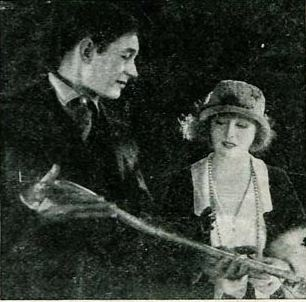
During a sojourn in the country she meets David Muir, who learns to love her

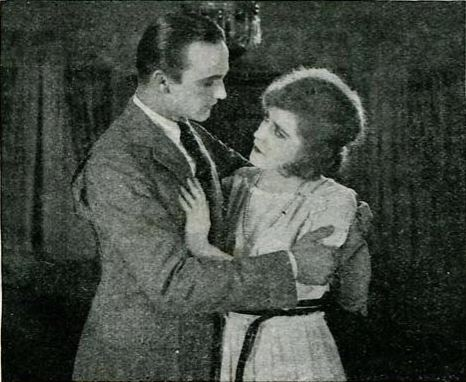
Resisting the pleas of her former dancing partner, Milly refuses to return to the café

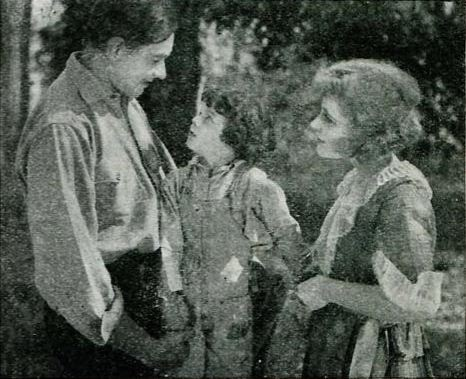
David persuades Milly; she promises to marry him and mother the waif that brought them together

== Cast ==
- Ethel Clayton as Milly West
- Walter Hiers as Tim Ennis
- Clyde Fillmore as David Muir
- Lillian Leighton as Ma Ennis
- William Boyd as Hughie Ray
- Rose Cade as Annie
- Robert Brower as Parson Neil
- Helen Jerome Eddy as Hester Neil
- Sylvia Ashton as Mrs. Babb

== Preservation status ==
- Currently a lost film.
