= The Last Man on Earth (1924 film) =

1924 film by John G. Blystone

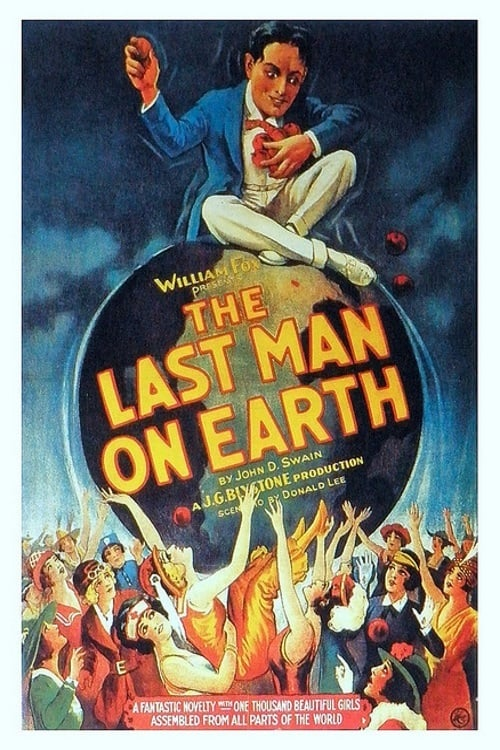
- Theatrical release poster
- Directed by: John G. Blystone
- Written by: Donald W. Lee
- Based on: "The Last Man on Earth"; 1923 novelette in Munsey's Magazine by John D. Swain
- Produced by: William Fox
- Starring: Earle Foxe; Grace Cunard; Gladys Tennyson; Derelys Perdue; Maurice Murphy; Clarissa Selwynne
- Cinematography: Allen M. Davey
- Music by: Ernö Rapée
- Production company: Fox Film Corporation
- Distributed by: Fox Film Corporation
- Release date: November 2, 1924 (U.S.)
- Running time: 70 minutes
- Country: United States
- Language: Silent (English intertitles)

The Last Man on Earth is a 1924 American silent comedy film directed by John G. Blystone, starring Earle Foxe and produced by Fox Film Corporation and based on the short story of the same name by John D. Swain that appeared in the November 1923 issue of Munsey's Magazine. The film was remade as the semi-musical comedy It's Great to Be Alive (1933) and in Spanish as El último varon sobre la Tierra (1933), and influenced the sci-fi novel Mr. Adam (1946).

== Plot ==
As described in a review in a film magazine, In 1940, Elmer Smith proposes to Hattie, his childhood sweetheart, and she turns him down, saying that she would not marry him if he were the last man on earth. He jumps in his plane, determined to go where there are no women. A strange disease known as "masculitis" develops that kills all the males over fourteen years old. Women now run the world.

Ten years later, Gertie, a gangster, while fleeing from the police finds herself in a forest and discovers Elmer, who has been living as a hermit. She brings him back and, after he is examined at a hospital, the government buys him for $10,000,000 as he is the last man on earth. Then arises the problem of what to do with him. Two lazy senators engage in a prize fight, the winner to claim him as a husband.

His former sweetheart Hattie attends the fight and Elmer sees her. Then it is all off as he rushes to Hattie, keeping the other women at bay. They marry and a year later, twin boys are born.

== Cast ==
- Earle Foxe as Elmer Smith
- Grace Cunard as Gertie
- Gladys Tennyson as Frisco Kate
- Derelys Perdue as Hattie
- Maurice Murphy as Elmer's Pal
- Clarissa Selwynne as Dr. Prodwell
- Fay Holderness as Elmer's Mother
- Marion Aye as Red Sal
- Harry Dunkinson as Elmer's Father
- Marie Astaire as Paula Prodwell
- Pauline French as Furlong
- Jean Johnston as Hattie (age 6)
- William Steele as Hattie's Father
- Buck Black as Elmer (age 8)
- Jean Dumas as Hattie's Mother
- Mimi Aguglia as Undetermined Secondary Role (uncredited)
- Lois Boyd as Undetermined Secondary Role (uncredited)
- Anita Garvin as A Millionairess (uncredited)
- Joan Meredith as Undetermined Secondary Role (uncredited)

== Censorship ==
Although filmed as a regular comedy, The Last Man on Earth was banned by the Virginia State Board of Censors for having women contending over a single man. As stated by the Board in a 29 October 1924 memorandum:

Although "The Last Man on Earth" is a comedy which has somewhat elaborately been staged, and does not purport to carry a serious message, the picture is of such a nature as to justify its total rejection in its present form. It is full of suggestive situations and questionable sub-titles calculated to convey a double meaning. The dignity of womanhood is flouted in almost every reel and an effort is made to win the laughter of the beholder through indecent scenes and salacious or smutty sub-titles. Even if the sub-titles and situations depicted could pass muster, there would still be a question as to whether or not the costumes worn by the actors come within the bounds of propriety.

The story of the comedy represents women of various ages contending in the most shameless fashion for the possession of a young man. Little, if any, attempt is made to conceal the fact that they are impelled by sex impulse. In some of the scenes the suggestion is so broad as to give one a positive shock.

The film was also banned by the British Board of Film Censors.

== Preservation ==
Prints of The Last Man on Earth are held in the Cinematheque Royale de Belgique in Brussels and the Museum of Modern Art in New York.
