= Daytime Wives =

1923 film

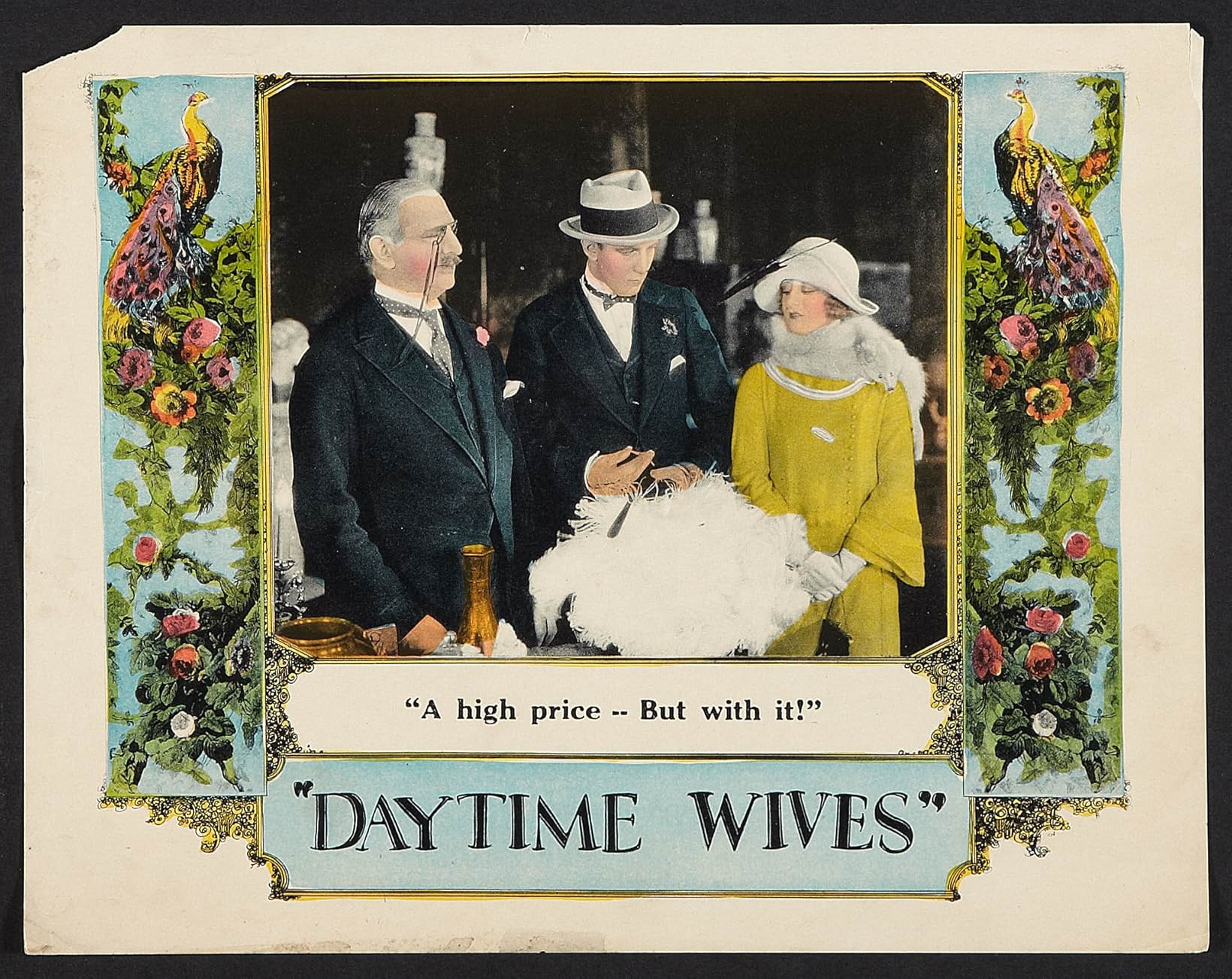
- Lobby card
- Directed by: Émile Chautard
- Screenplay by: Helmer Walton Bergman; Wyndham Gittens
- Story by: Lenore Coffee; John F. Goodrich
- Starring: Derelys Perdue; Wyndham Standing; Grace Darmond; William Conklin; Guy Edward Hearn; Katherine Lewis
- Cinematography: Lucien Andriot
- Production company: Robertson-Cole Pictures Corporation
- Distributed by: Film Booking Offices of America
- Release date: September 2, 1923
- Running time: 70 minutes
- Country: United States
- Language: Silent (English intertitles)

Daytime Wives is a 1923 American drama film directed by Émile Chautard, and written by Helmer Walton Bergman and Wyndham Gittens. The film stars Derelys Perdue, Wyndham Standing, Grace Darmond, William Conklin, Guy Edward Hearn, and Katherine Lewis. The film was released on September 2, 1923, by Film Booking Offices of America.

== Cast ==
- Derelys Perdue as Ruth Holt
- Wyndham Standing as Elwood Adams
- Grace Darmond as Francine Adams
- William Conklin as Amos Martin
- Guy Edward Hearn as Ben Branscom
- Katherine Lewis as Betty Branscom
- Kenneth Gibson as Larry Gilfeather
- Christina Mott as Celeste
- Jack Carlyle as Jack Jagner
- Craig Biddle Jr. as A Laborer
- Mickey McBan as Child (uncredited)
