= The Midnight Guest =

1923 film

- Directed by: George Archainbaud
- Screenplay by: Rupert Julian
- Story by: Rupert Julian; A. P. Younger
- Starring: Grace Darmond; Mahlon Hamilton; Clyde Fillmore; Pat Harmon; Mathilde Brundage
- Cinematography: Charles J. Stumar
- Production company: Universal Pictures
- Distributed by: Universal Pictures
- Release date: March 17, 1923
- Running time: 50 minutes
- Country: United States
- Language: English

The Midnight Guest is a 1923 American crime film directed by George Archainbaud and written by Rupert Julian. The film stars Grace Darmond, Mahlon Hamilton, Clyde Fillmore, Pat Harmon and Mathilde Brundage. The film was released on March 17, 1923, by Universal Pictures.

== Cast ==
- Grace Darmond as Gabrielle
- Mahlon Hamilton as John Dryden
- Clyde Fillmore as William Chatfield
- Pat Harmon as Monk
- Mathilde Brundage as Aunt Sally
