= Clyde Fillmore =

American actor

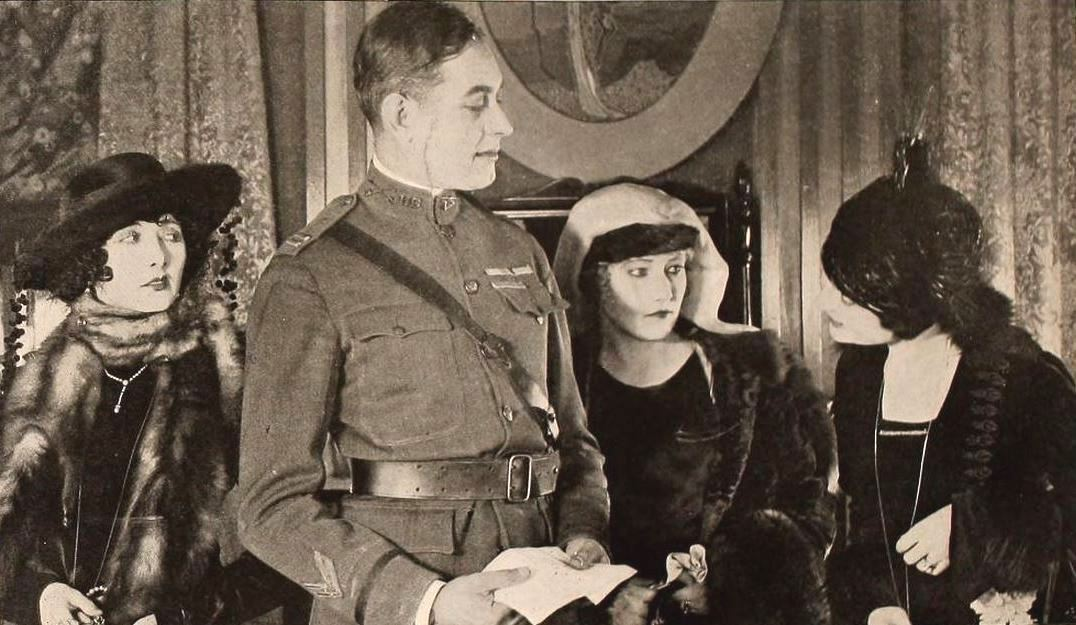
- The Devil's Pass Key (1920)
- Born: Clyde Fogel; October 25, 1874; McConnelsville, Ohio, US
- Died: December 19, 1946 (Aged 72); Santa Monica, California, US
- Resting place: cremated
- Education: University of Oregon
- Occupation: actor
- Years active: 1918–1946
- Spouse: Lea Penman

Clyde Fillmore (born Clyde Fogel; October 25, 1874 – December 19, 1946), was an American actor of stage and screen. He is best remembered for a 1920 silent film that is now long lost, The Devil's Pass Key directed by Erich von Stroheim. In the sound era he played several character parts, sometimes uncredited. He began in films in 1918 at the age of 43 after a stage career.

Fillmore graduated from the University of Oregon in 1898.

Fillmore's stage credits include having the lead in a 25-week run of Civilian Clothes at the Morosco Theatre in Los Angeles.

Film studios for which Fillmore worked included Famous Players–Lasky.

Fillmore married actress Lea Penman in San Francisco, California, on December 6, 1924, the day after she was granted an annulment of her second marriage.

== Filmography ==
Year	Title	Role	Notes
1919	The Millionaire Pirate	Robert Spurr	
1919	The Fire Flingers	Benjamin Burley	
1919	When Fate Decides	Donald Cavendish	
1919	The Sundown Trail	Velvet Eddy	
1920	Nurse Marjorie	John Danbury	
1920	The Ladder of Lies	Peter Gordon	
1920	The Devil's Pass Key	Captain Rex Strong	
1920	Crooked Streets	Lawrence Griswold	
1920	The Soul of Youth	Mr. Hamilton	
1920	A City Sparrow	David Muir	
1921	The Outside Woman	Dr. Frederick Ralston	
1921	Sham	Tom Jaffrey	
1921	The Sting of the Lash	Joel Grant	
1921	Moonlight Follies	Tony Griswold	
1922	Real Adventure	Rodney Aldrich	
1923	The Midnight Guest	William Chatfield	
1923	The Love Pirate	Chief Deputy Hugh Waring	
1924	Alimony	Granville	
1930	Hot Bridge		Short, Uncredited
1930	Song Service	Mr. Wellman	Short
1935	Annapolis Farewell	Lieutenant Commander	Uncredited
1937	The Affairs of Pierre		Short
1938	Air Parade		Short
1938	Getting an Eyeful	Buddy	Short
1941	Unholy Partners	Jason Grant	
1941	The Shanghai Gesture	The Comprador	
1942	The Remarkable Andrew	Mayor Ollie Lancaster	
1942	Two Yanks in Trinidad	Col. Powers	
1942	The Mystery of Marie Roget	Mons. De Luc	
1942	The Talk of the Town	Senator James Boyd	Uncredited
1942	My Sister Eileen	Ralph Craven	
1942	Laugh Your Blues Away	Sen. Hargrave	
1942	Fall In	Arnold Benedict	
1942	When Johnny Comes Marching Home	Hamilton Wellman	
1943	Margin for Error	Dr. Jennings	
1943	City Without Men	Senator Malloy	
1943	Taxi, Mister	Alderman Hogan, ex-Baseball Umpire	
1943	The More the Merrier	Senator Noonan	
1943	Watch on the Rhine	Sam Chandler	
1943	Swing Fever	Mr. Nagen	
1943	What a Woman!	Dillon	Uncredited
1944	Once Upon a Time	FBI Agent	Uncredited
1944	The Scarlet Claw	Inspector	Uncredited
1944	Christmas Holiday	Colonel	Uncredited
1944	Wilson	Senator	Uncredited
1944	Gypsy Wildcat		Uncredited
1944	Laura	Owner of Bullitt & Co Ad Agency	Uncredited
1944	Bowery to Broadway	Reformer	Uncredited
1944	Three Is a Family	Mr. Spencer	
1944	Tahiti Nights	High Priest	Uncredited
1945	Keep Your Powder Dry	Gen. Brett	Uncredited
1945	Between Two Women	Slipper Room Patron	Uncredited
1945	I'll Remember April	J.C. Cartwright	
1945	Guest Wife	President Reed	Uncredited
1945	Lady on a Train	Waring Cousin	Uncredited
1945	The Hidden Eye	Rodney Hampton	
1945	Week-End at the Waldorf	Party Guest	Uncredited
1945	She Went to the Races	Dr. Bostwick	Uncredited
1945	Hit the Hay	Mayor Blackburn	
1946	Colonel Effingham's Raid	Engineer	Uncredited
1946	Bad Bascomb	Gov. Clark	Uncredited
1946	Strange Voyage	Barrier, the Sportsman	(final film role)
