= Untamed Youth (1924 film) =

1924 silent film

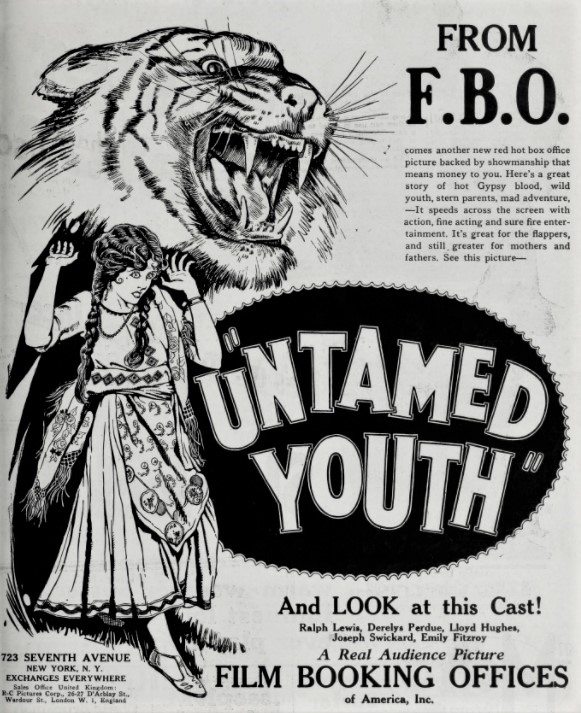
- Directed by: Emile Chautard
- Written by: Charles Beahan; Charles Stillson
- Based on: Born of the Cyclone by G. Marion Burton
- Starring: Derelys Perdue; Lloyd Hughes; Ralph Lewis
- Cinematography: Pierre Collings; Joseph A. Dubray
- Production company: Robertson-Cole Pictures Corporation
- Distributed by: Film Booking Offices of America
- Release date: May 4, 1924
- Running time: 50 minutes
- Country: United States
- Languages: Silent; English intertitles

Untamed Youth is a 1924 American silent drama film directed by Emile Chautard and starring Derelys Perdue, Lloyd Hughes and Ralph Lewis.

== Cast ==
- Ralph Lewis as Joe Ardis
- Derelys Perdue as Marcheta
- Lloyd Hughes as Robert Ardis
- Emily Fitzroy as Emily Ardis
- Josef Swickard as Pietro
- Joseph J. Dowling as Reverend Loranger
- Tom O'Brien as Jim Larson
- Mickey McBan as Ralph

== Preservation ==
With no prints of Untamed Youth located in any film archives, it is considered a lost film.

== Bibliography ==
- Munden, Kenneth White. The American Film Institute Catalog of Motion Pictures Produced in the United States, Part 1. University of California Press, 1997.
