= Below the Surface (1920 film) =

1920 film by Irvin Willat

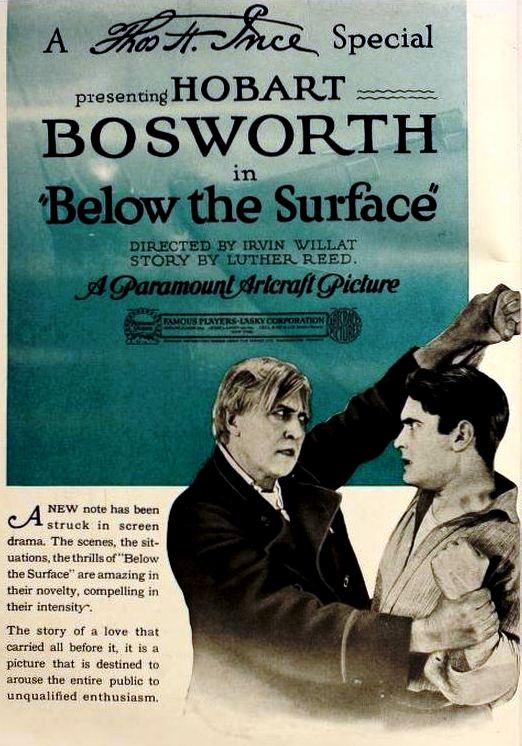
- Ad for film
- Directed by: Irvin Willat
- Written by: Luther Reed (screen story); E. Magnus Ingleton (scenario)
- Produced by: Thomas H. Ince
- Starring: Hobart Bosworth; Grace Darmond
- Cinematography: J.O. Taylor
- Distributed by: Paramount Pictures
- Release date: June 1920
- Running time: 60 minutes; 6 reels (6,220 feet)
- Country: United States
- Language: Silent (English intertitles)

Below the Surface

Below the Surface is a surviving 1920 American silent drama film directed by Irvin Willat and starring Hobart Bosworth. Thomas H. Ince produced the picture with distribution through Paramount Pictures.

The film survives in the Library of Congress along with outtakes from the production, and it has been released on DVD.

== Plot ==
Martin Flint and his son Paul Flint are partners in a deep sea diving business who are heralded as heroes after they save the lives of twenty men trapped in a sunken submarine. This brings their names to the attention of confidence man James Arnold, who tries to interest them in a fraudulent scheme to extract treasure from a sunken wreck. The father declines, but the son accepts, lured by a young woman with the con man, Edna Gordon, whom Luther is tricked into marrying. As a result of the dive to the treasure ship, Luther is stricken with the bends, and after he returns home to find that his wife has abandoned him, he becomes desperately ill. The doctor tells Martin that any further upset could kill his son, so despite knowing that she has no interest in his son, he calms Paul by telling him that he's going to bring Edna back to him. Martin discovers that Edna and Luther have returned to Boston, so he goes to an underworld cabaret she frequents in an attempt to get her back. She refuses to return, so he drags her out of the club, and they board the ferry to return home to Paul. James follows them to rescue his lover, Edna, from her father-in-law, but before they are able to escape her cabin the ferry rams into a derelict hidden by a fog bank, and the ship rapidly begins to sink. Martin attempts to save them, but is carried away by the swift influx of water and has no choice but to board a lifeboat. Luther refuses to accept his father's story, and risks his life to make the dive down to the sunken ferry only to discover the floating bodies of his wife and her lover, James.

== Cast ==
- Hobart Bosworth as Martin Flint
- Grace Darmond as Edna Gordon
- Lloyd Hughes as Paul Flint
- George Webb as James Arnold
- Gladys George as Alice
- J. P. Lockney as Dave
- Edith Yorke as Marth Flint
- George Clair as Geb Quail

== See also ==
- List of Paramount Pictures films
