= The Beautiful Gambler =

1921 film

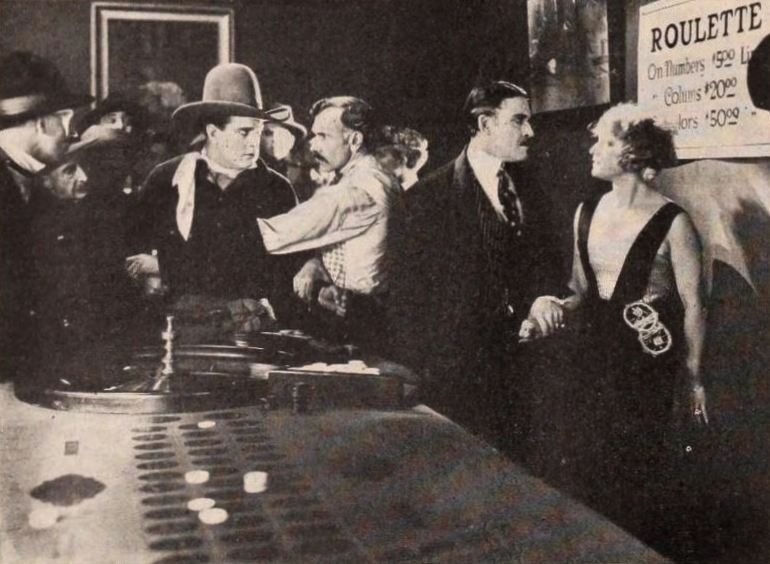
- A still from the film.
- Directed by: William Worthington
- Written by: Hope Loring; Peter B. Kyne
- Starring: Grace Darmond; Jack Mower; Harry von Meter
- Cinematography: George Barnes
- Production company: Universal Film Manufacturing Company
- Distributed by: Universal Film Manufacturing Company
- Release date: June 1921
- Running time: 5 reels
- Country: United States
- Languages: Silent; English intertitles

The Beautiful Gambler is a 1921 American silent Western film directed by William Worthington and starring Grace Darmond, Jack Mower, and Harry von Meter.

== Plot ==
Molly Hanlon marries a villainous and professional gambler after her father gets into a lot of debt from gambling. One day, the saloon she is at catches on fire, but she is saved by Miles Rand. Both Hanlon and Rand assume that the gambler has perished, and move to New York. However, it is revealed that the gambler is not dead, and he tracks the two down to kill them in revenge. He is unsuccessful. and Rand kills him, but authorities unaware of the circumstances arrest him and have him convicted of murder. One of the gambler's associates explains the situation to authorities, and Rand is freed. The film ends with Hanlon and Rand being free to marry.

== Cast ==
- Grace Darmond as Molly Hanlon
- Jack Mower as Miles Rand
- Harry von Meter as Lee Kirk
- Charles Brinley as Jim Devlin
- Herschel Mayall as Judge Rand
- Willis Marks as Mark Hanlon

== Preservation ==
With no holdings located in archives, The Beautiful Gambler is considered a lost film.
