= A Diplomatic Mission =

1918 American silent comedy-drama film

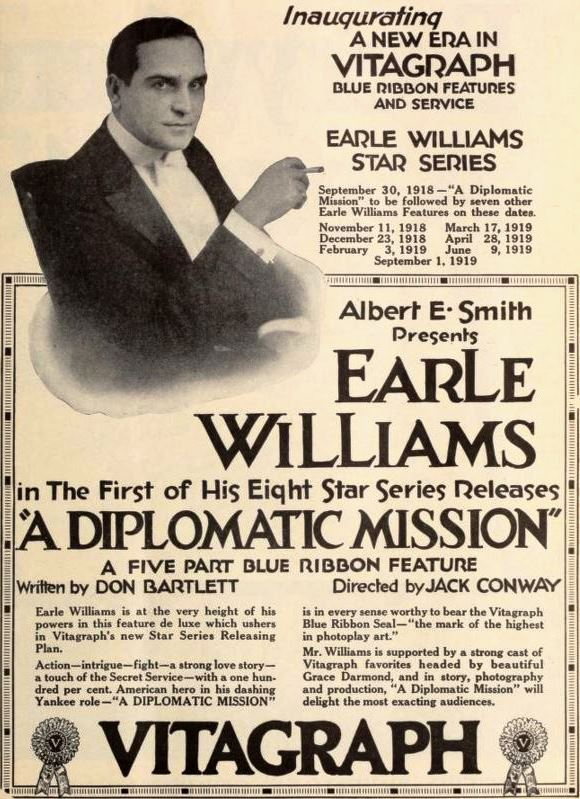
- Directed by: Jack Conway
- Written by: Don Bartlett; Albert J. Ohlson
- Produced by: Albert E. Smith
- Starring: Earle Williams; Grace Darmond; Leslie Stuart
- Production company: Vitagraph Company of America
- Distributed by: Vitagraph Company of America
- Release date: September 30, 1918
- Running time: 5 reels
- Country: United States
- Languages: Silent; English intertitles

A Diplomatic Mission is a 1918 American silent comedy-drama film directed by Jack Conway and starring Earle Williams, Grace Darmond and Leslie Stuart.

== Cast ==
- Earle Williams as Sylvester Todd
- Grace Darmond as Lady Diana Loring
- Leslie Stuart as Sir John Boyden
- Kathleen Kirkham as Lady Boyden
- J. Gordon Russell as Von Goetz

== Bibliography ==
- James Robert Parish & Michael R. Pitts. Film directors: a guide to their American films. Scarecrow Press, 1974.
