= A Dangerous Adventure (serial) =

1922 film

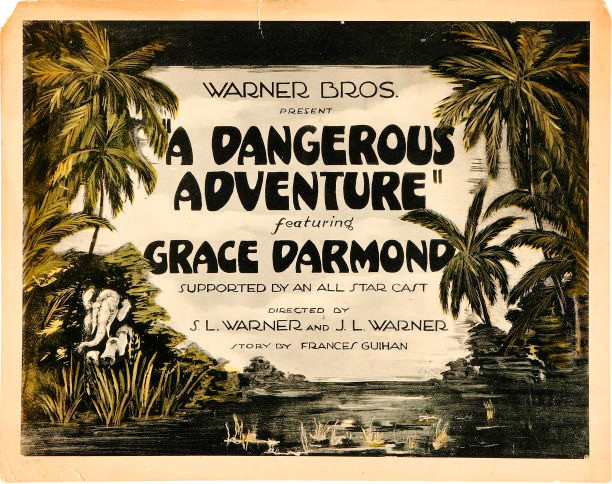
- Lobby card
- Directed by: Sam Warner; Jack L. Warner
- Screenplay by: Sam Warner
- Based on: A Dangerous Adventure by Frances Guihan
- Produced by: William Nicholas Selig
- Starring: Grace Darmond; Philo McCullough; Jack Richardson; Robert Agnew; Derelys Perdue; Rex De Rosselli
- Cinematography: André Barlatier; John W. Boyle; Walter L. Griffin; Floyd Jackman
- Production company: Warner Bros.
- Distributed by: Warner Bros.
- Release date: November 1, 1922
- Running time: 15 chapters
- Country: United States
- Language: Silent (English intertitles)
- Budget: $175,000
- Box office: $142,000 (worldwide rentals)

A Dangerous Adventure is a 1922 American silent adventure serial film directed by Sam Warner and Jack L. Warner and written by Sam Warner. The film stars Grace Darmond, Philo McCullough, Jack Richardson, Robert Agnew, Derelys Perdue, and Rex De Rosselli. The film was released by Warner Bros. on November 1, 1922.

== Plot ==
As described in a film magazine review, two young women and their uncle trek into Africa in quest of buried treasure. They encounter wild animals, terrible natives, and rampaging storms but escape them all. The sweethearts of the women come to their rescue and bring them back.

== Cast ==
- Grace Darmond as Marjorie Stanton
- Philo McCullough as MacDonald Hayden
- Jack Richardson as Herbert Brandon
- Robert Agnew as Jimmy Morrison
- Derelys Perdue as Edith Stanton
- Rex De Rosselli as Ubanga
- Omar Whitehead as Native

== Chapter titles ==
1. The Jungle Storm
2. The Sacrifice
3. The Lion Pit
4. Brandon's Revenge
5. At the Leopard's Mercy
6. The Traitor
7. The Volcano
8. The Escape
9. The Leopard's Cave
10. The Jungle Water Hole
11. The Hippopotamus Swamp
12. The Lion's Prey
13. In the Tiger's Lair
14. The Treasure Cave
15. The Rescue

== Reception ==
According to Warner Bros records the film earned $83,000 domestically and $59,000 foreign.
