= Olga de Meyer =

British-born artists' model, socialite, patron of the arts, writer and fashion figure

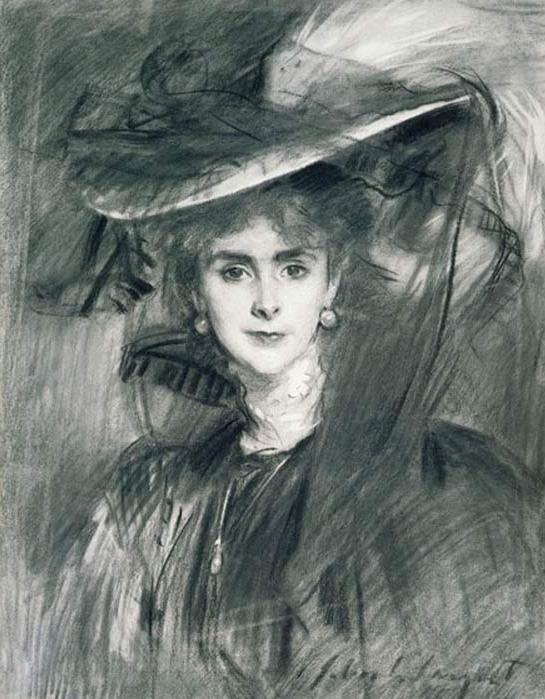
Drawing of Olga de Meyer by John Singer Sargent, 1907

Baroness Olga de Meyer (born Maria Beatrice Olga Alberta Caracciolo; 8 August 1871 – 6 January 1931) was a British-born artists' model, socialite, patron of the arts, writer, and fashion figure of the early 20th century. She was best known as the wife of photographer Adolph de Meyer and goddaughter of King Edward VII, who was also rumoured to be her biological father. After 1916, she preferred to be known as Mahrah de Meyer.

== Background ==
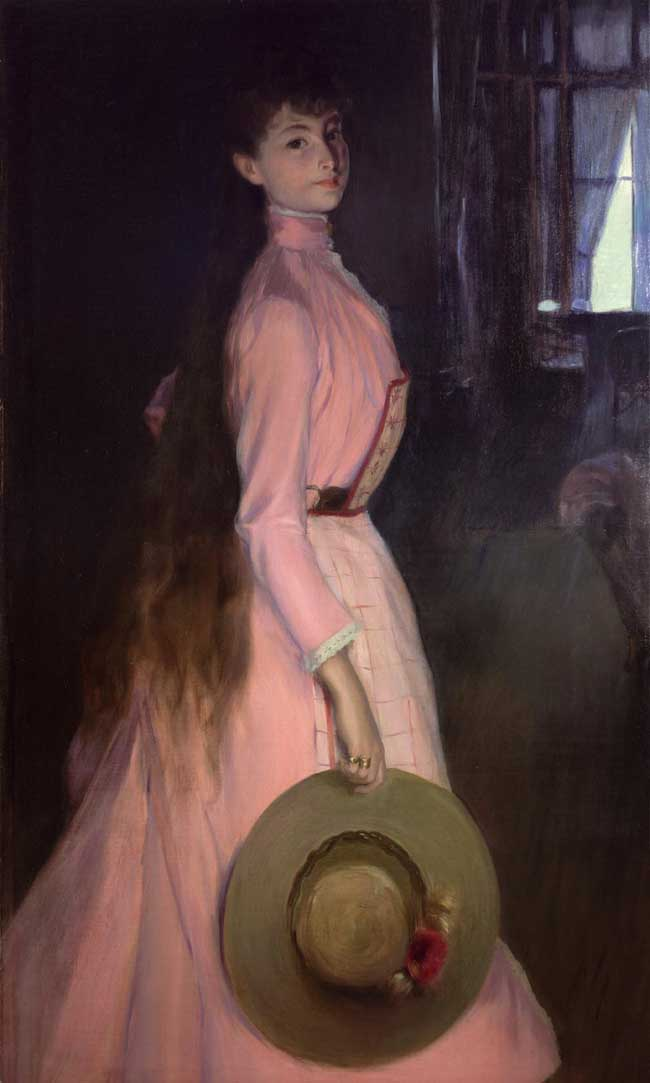
Portrait of Donna Olga Caracciolo dei Duchi di Castelluccio by Jacques-Emile Blanche, 1889

Of Portuguese, Italian, French, and American descent, she was born Donna Maria Beatrice Olga Alberta Caracciolo in London, England. Her father was Neapolitan nobleman Gennaro Caracciolo Pinelli (1849–?), eldest son of the 4th Duke of Castelluccio, while her mother was the former Marie Blanche Sampayo (1849–1890), a daughter of Antoine François Oscar Sampayo, a French diplomat who served as that country's minister to Portugal, and his American wife, Virginia Timberlake. Her great-grandmother Margaret O'Neill Eaton was the central figure in the Petticoat affair, a scandal that plagued President Andrew Jackson. Another great-grandparent was a Marshal of France, Count Auguste Regnaud de Saint-Jean d'Angély.

Olga was born at 14 William Street, Lowndes Square, Chelsea, on 8 August 1871 and her father registered the birth in Chelsea North-East Sub-District on 5 September 1871, 'Olga' being the third and 'Alberta' the fifth of her seven forenames. The 1871 Census, taken on 3 April 1871, showed the couple with her mother at Thomas's Hotel and Lord Carrington's diary shows them together at Marlborough House on 4 July 1871 when the Duchess was heavily pregnant and the Duke was unwell. Jane Ridley says that the Duchess 'scandalised London society that winter, going out shooting in a kilt and smoking cigarettes'. Later gossip purveyed by Jacques Emile Blanche (who knew Olga and her mother at Dieppe in the 1880s) said that the couple had separated 'at the church door' and that Olga was the daughter or god-daughter of the Prince of Wales, later King Edward VII, but Ridley considers it most unlikely that she was his child. As a Catholic Olga was certainly not the Prince's god-daughter. In the 1870s when staying at Sandringham 'an Italian Duchess, who is an Englishwoman, and her daughter, brought up as a Roman Catholic and now turning Protestant', presumably the Duchess and Olga, are mentioned by a visiting bishop. According to the writer Philippe Jullian the Prince believed that Olga was his child and supported her, but others assumed that her mother's friend Stanislaus Augustus, 3rd Prince Poniatowski (1835–1908), a married former equerry of Napoleon III, was her father. Immediately after the death of her mother in 1891, Olga went to Naples and married in 1892, Prince Marino Brancaccio, a member of another Catholic family, but they were divorced at Hamburg in June 1899. When Olga married Adolph de Meyer the following month in London she did so in a Protestant ceremony.

Olga de Meyer attended the King's coronation in Westminster Abbey in 1902 when her presence was described as "conspicuous". According to an article entitled "Coronation of King Edward VII: Splendid Scene in Westminster Abbey", The New York Times, 10 August 1902, Olga sat in the front row of the King's box along with several of his intimate friends, including Mary Cornwallis-West, Minnie Paget and the king's mistress Alice Keppel.

In 1916, Olga de Meyer took the forename "Mahrah" upon the advice of an astrologer.

== Marriages ==
Olga Caracciolo was married to:

- Nobile Marino Brancaccio (1852–1920), a Neapolitan nobleman who was a son of Carlo Brancaccio, Prince of Triggiano and Duke of Lustra. They married in Naples, Italy, on 9 May 1892 (civil) and 11 May 1892 (religious), and divorced on 7 June 1899, in Hamburg, Germany. Artist Jacques-Émile Blanche, a family friend, called it "a short and most dramatic union".'
- Adolph de Meyer (1868–1946), a celebrated artist dubbed by Cecil Beaton "the Debussy of photography." They married on 25 July 1899 at Holy Trinity Church, Sloane Street, Cadogan Square, in London. This was a marriage of convenience, as the groom was homosexual and the bride was bisexual; some sources identify her as a lesbian. The de Meyers were characterised by Violet Trefusis—who counted Olga among her lovers and whose mother, Alice Keppel, was Edward VII's best known mistress—as "Pederaste and Médisante" (a pun on Pelleas and Melisande, from the French for 'pederast' and 'woman who criticises/maligns [médire]') because, as Trefusis observed "He looked so queer and she had such a vicious tongue."

Among her affairs was one with Princess (Edmond) de Polignac, an heiress of Singer sewing machines and arts patron, in the years 1901 to 1905.

== Muse and writer ==
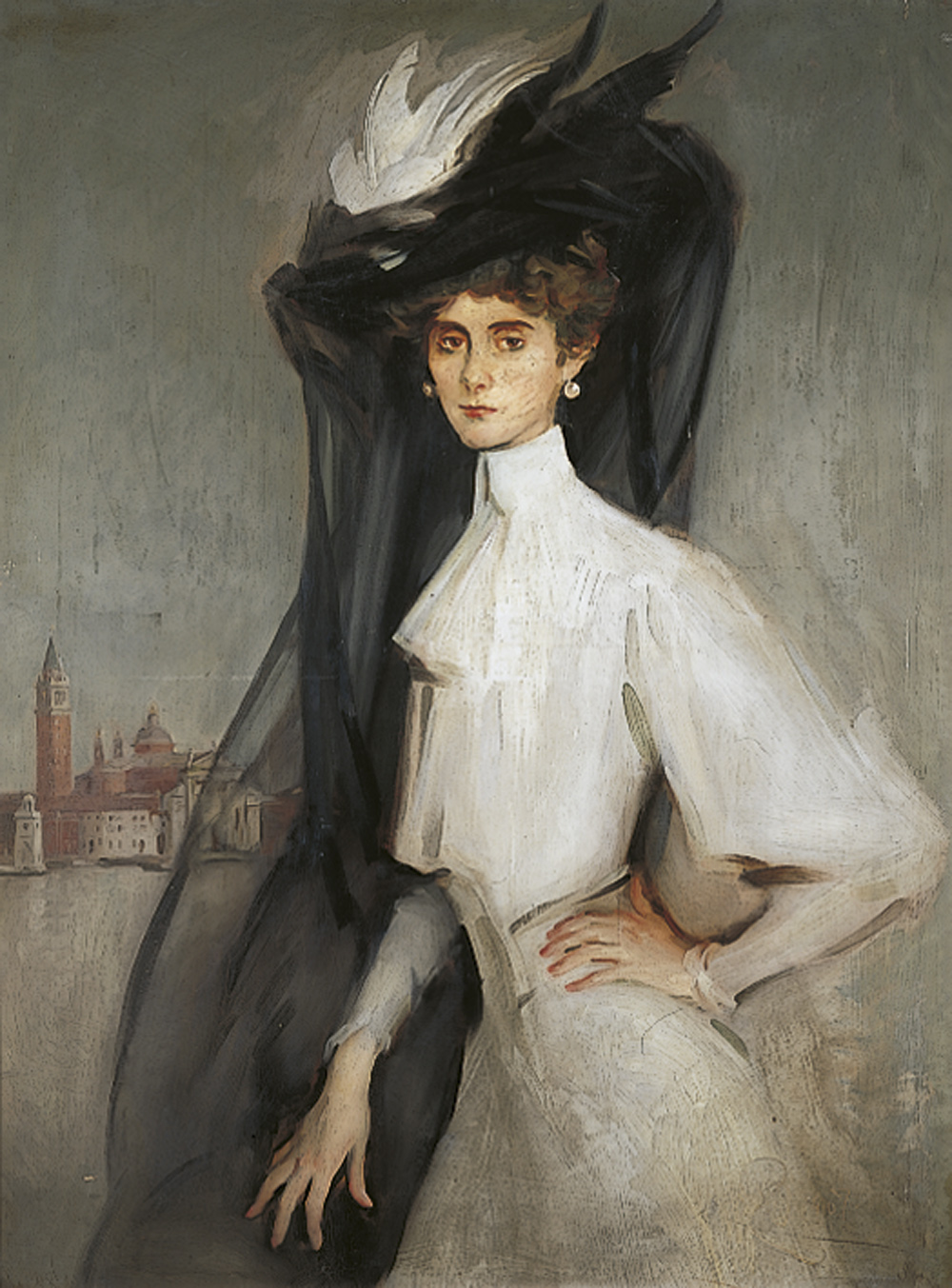
Portrait of Olga de Meyer by William Bruce Ellis Ranken, Leeds Museums and Galleries

Known for "her elusive combination of childlike innocence and soigné charm" and described as "tall and slender, with Venetian red hair", Olga de Meyer was muse and model to many artists, among them Jacques-Émile Blanche, James McNeill Whistler, James Jebusa Shannon, Giovanni Boldini, Walter Sickert, John Singer Sargent, and Paul César Helleu. Another of her artist admirers was Charles Conder, who was infatuated with Olga Caracciolo and painted her portrait; Aubrey Beardsley was part of her youthful circle as well. Olga de Meyer also inspired characters in novels by Elinor Glyn and Ada Leverson.

Of Olga's beauty, British novelist George Moore was unimpressed. As he commented to an admiring artist friend, "By Jove, you're all after the girl, a fine Mélisande for the stage, with her beautiful hair down to her heels. She's paintable, I admit, but as to one's daily use, I should rather have the mother than the child. Too slender for me ... you know my tastes."

She worked briefly as a society columnist for La Galoise, a Paris newspaper, in the 1890s. As Mahrah de Meyer, a name she adopted in 1916, she wrote one novel, the autobiographical Nadine Narska (Wilmarth Publishing, 1916). The New York Times condemned the novel as "morbid, exaggerated, ... [and] guilty of many carelessly written sentences", while The Dial called de Meyer's book "a miscellaneous mixture of paganism, diluted Nietzsche, worldly morals, and the doctrine of reincarnation".

One of de Meyer's short stories, Clothes and Treachery, was made into The Devil's Pass Key, a 1919 silent movie by director Erich von Stroheim.

== Sportswoman ==
Known as the "woman [amateur fencing] champion of Europe", Baroness de Meyer competed at tournaments in Europe and the United States in the early 1900s. At the Colony Club in New York City on 6 January 1913, she participated in an exhibition match with California champion fencer Sibyl Marston.

== Death ==
An observer wrote "Nervous, drugged, surrounded by ambiguous friends and accompanied by a too-conspicuous husband, Olga had become frankly spiteful. Her scandal-mongering had eliminated the last of her respectable friends, and people visited her only because they could be sure to find a pipe of opium or a sniff of cocaine."

Olga de Meyer is said to have died of a heart attack in a detoxification clinic in Austria in 1930 or 1931, but she was reported as being at St. Moritz with her husband in January 1931. She died on 6 January 1931, aged 59. She was interred two days later at Freiburg, Baden, Germany.

== Sources ==
- Profile of Adolf de Meyer, broadway.cas.sc.edu
- Meyer, A. de. Of Passions and Tenderness: Portraits of Olga by Baron de Meyer. Marina del Rey: Graystone Books, 1992
