= Alimony (1924 film) =

1924 film

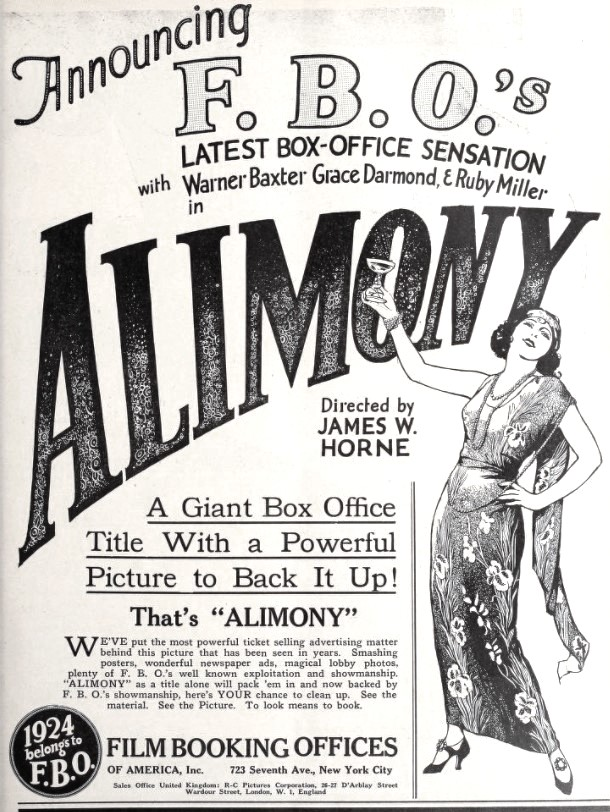
- Advertisement
- Directed by: James W. Horne
- Written by: Wyndham Gittens; E. Magnus Ingleton
- Story by: Ashley T. Locke
- Starring: Grace Darmond; Warner Baxter; Ruby Miller
- Cinematography: Joseph A. Dubray
- Production company: Robertson-Cole Pictures Corporation
- Distributed by: Film Booking Offices of America
- Release date: February 3, 1924
- Running time: 70 minutes
- Country: United States
- Language: Silent (English intertitles)

Alimony is a 1924 American silent drama film directed by James W. Horne and starring Grace Darmond, Warner Baxter, and Ruby Miller. In the United Kingdom it was released under the title When the Crash Came.

== Plot ==
As described in a film magazine review, Jimmy Mason, inventor, and his wife Marion are in desperate circumstances. When he becomes ill, she sells his invention to Granville, a wealthy oil man. Granville covets Marion and, with the wiles of adventuress Gloria Du Bois, separates Marion from Jimmy over the husband's supposed dalliance with that other woman. Jimmy soon goes broke after Marion demands and gets a huge alimony allowance. With the money thus obtained, she comes to his rescue and reestablishes his fortunes by marrying him on her terms, and they face a happy future together.

== Cast ==
- Grace Darmond as Marion Mason
- Warner Baxter as Jimmy Mason
- Ruby Miller as Gloria Du Bois
- William A. Carroll as Philip Coburn
- Jackie Saunders as Betty Coburn
- Clyde Fillmore as Granville
- Herschel Mayall as Blake
- Alton Brown as Grey

== Preservation ==
With no prints of Alimony located in any film archives, it is considered a lost film.
