= Alimony in the United States =

Alimony is governed in the United States by U.S. state laws, which establish requirements regarding payments, recovery and penalties. The determination of alimony varies greatly from state to state within the U.S. Some state statutes, including those of Texas, Montana, Kansas, Utah, Kentucky and Maine, give explicit guidelines to judges on the amount and/or duration of alimony. In Texas, Mississippi and Tennessee, for example, alimony is awarded only in cases of marriage or civil union of ten years or longer and the payments are limited to three years unless there are special, extenuating circumstances.

Alimony terms are among the most frequent issues causing litigation in family law cases. Eighty percent of divorce cases involve a request for modification of alimony.

In Texas, there is a legal presumption that alimony is not appropriate. Only after the requesting spouse can reasonably demonstrate that they have given the best effort in good faith to secure an independent income but failed is a petition for alimony taken into consideration. The amount of spousal support in that may be awarded is limited to the lesser of $5,000 per month or 20% of the payee's gross income.

Some states, including California, Nevada and New York, have spousal support statutes that list factors that a judge should consider when determining alimony. In these states, the determination of duration and amount of alimony is left to the discretion of the family court judges as limited by legal precedent. In 2012, Massachusetts enacted alimony reform that set limits on alimony and eliminated lifetime alimony. In 2013, Colorado signed into law alimony reform, creating a standardized non-presumptive guideline upon which courts can rely.

== Types of alimony ==
In general, there are four types of alimony:

1. Temporary alimony: Support ordered when the parties are separated prior to divorce. Also called alimony pendente lite, which is Latin, meaning, "pending the suit".
2. Rehabilitative alimony: Support given to a lesser-earning spouse for a period of time necessary to acquire work outside the home and become self-sufficient.
3. Permanent alimony: Support paid to the lesser-earning spouse until the death of the payor, the death of the recipient, or the remarriage of the recipient.
4. Reimbursement alimony: Support given as a reimbursement for expenses incurred by a spouse during the marriage (such as educational expenses).

Some of the possible factors that bear on the amount and duration of the support are:

Factor	Description
Length of the marriage or civil union	Generally, alimony lasts for a term or period. However, it will last longer if the marriage or civil union lasted longer. A marriage or civil union of over 10 years is often a candidate for permanent alimony.
Time separated while still married	In some U.S. states, separation is a triggering event, recognized as the end of the term of the marriage. Other U.S. states do not recognize separation or legal separation. In a state not recognizing separation, a 2-year marriage followed by an 8-year separation will generally be treated like a 10-year marriage.
Age of the parties at the time of the divorce	Generally, more youthful spouses are considered to be more able to 'get on' with their lives, and therefore thought to require shorter periods of support.
Relative income of the parties	In U.S. states that recognize a right of the spouses to live 'according to the means to which they have become accustomed', alimony attempts to adjust the incomes of the spouses so that they are able to approximate, as best possible, their prior lifestyle.
Future financial prospects of the parties	A spouse who is going to realize significant income in the future is likely to have to pay higher alimony than one who is not.
Health of the parties	Poor health goes towards need, and potentially an inability to support oneself. The courts are disinclined to leave one party indigent.
Fault in marital breakdown	In U.S. states where fault is recognized, fault can significantly affect alimony, increasing, reducing or even nullifying it. Many U.S. states are 'no-fault' states, where one does not have to show fault to get divorced. No-fault divorce spares the spouses the acrimony of the 'fault' processes, and closes the eyes of the court to any and all improper spousal behavior. In Georgia, however, a person who has an affair that causes the divorce is not entitled to alimony.

== Prenuptial agreements ==
Prenuptial agreements are recognized in all fifty states and the District of Columbia. Every jurisdiction allows parties to agree to spousal support and alimony terms in a premarital or postnuptial agreement, if their marital agreement is prepared in accordance with state and federal law requirements. Divorce courts retain the discretion to refuse to enforce prenuptial agreement terms restricting a party's right to seek alimony if that party would have to seek public assistance as a result of the alimony waiver, or if the restriction on the right to seek alimony is unconscionable or unfair when the divorce occurs. Lack of financial disclosure prior to signing a prenuptial agreement or a post-nuptial agreement by the party against whom alimony is sought may also cause a court to invalidate a waiver of alimony provision. Prenuptial Agreements with valid alimony waivers or restrictions entered into in one state should be fully enforceable by the courts of another state in the event of a divorce, unless the terms of the prenuptial agreement violate the foreign jurisdiction's laws.

California is the only state with a law that requires that the parties be represented by counsel if spousal support (alimony) is limited by the agreement.

Instead of a complete waiver of the right to seek alimony, prenuptial agreements and post-nuptial agreements can also contain terms where the parties agree to a set amount of guaranteed alimony for the lower wage earner at the time of divorce, or limit on the amount of alimony either party can seek if they divorce.

== Alimony reform ==
In the United States, family laws and precedents as they relate to divorce and alimony vary based on state law. Also, with new family models, "working couples", "working wives", "stay-at-home dads", etc., there are situations where some parties to a divorce question whether traditional economic allocations made in a divorce are fair to their individual case. Some groups have proposed various forms of legislation to reform alimony parameters (i.e. amounts and term).

Some states (e.g. Florida, Texas, Maine) are moving away from permanent alimony awards that are intended to maintain a spouse's standard of living enjoyed during the marriage and are moving towards durational or rehabilitative alimony. In other states, like Mississippi and Tennessee, alimony is usually awarded for life.

Some of the critical issues that proponents and opponents of alimony reform disagree upon are:

- Whether alimony should be temporary or permanent
- Regardless of duration, should alimony payers have the unquestionable right to retire?
- Does the lesser earning spouse deserve alimony to meet his or her basic needs (sustenance) or enough to sustain "the lifestyle accustomed to during the civil union or marriage"?
- Should the income and assets of a new spouse be used in determining how much alimony gets paid?
- How clear and prescriptive should state statutes be versus allowing a larger degree of Judicial Discretion?

In 2012, bills were introduced in the New Jersey Assembly and Senate. The Assembly passed a bill calling for a Blue Ribbon Commission to address Alimony Reform. The Senate has a similar bill pending that has not yet been posted in the Judiciary Committee. The NJ Matrimonial Bar Association has been vehemently fighting against Alimony Reform, led by Patrick Judge Jr. chairman of the Family Law section of the New Jersey State Bar Association. Attorney Judge stated that the New Jersey State Bar Association ("NJSBA") objected to the inclusion of individuals with a vested interest in reforming alimony on the Blue Ribbon Commission and that the NJSBA supported the "establishment of a commission [to study alimony reform] but only as long as the commission is constituted so that a fair and unbiased review of the current alimony laws takes place…[and] should not be predisposed to an outcome…."

In 2023 Florida passed an alimony reform bill (SB 1416) which eliminated permanent alimony and established a process for allowing alimony payers to request modifications when they want to retire. The bill allowed judges to reduce or terminate alimony obligations based on a number of factors. The passage came after decades of contentious debate garnering three vetoes of similar bills. Some groups that were previously major opponents of the reform approved of the 2023 policy, such as Florida Family Fairness and The Florida Bar.

California, Connecticut, Georgia, Illinois, Oklahoma, New York, South Carolina, Tennessee, Utah, and West Virginia have all passed laws that allow for the modification or termination of alimony upon demonstration that the recipient is cohabitating with another person. In April 2009, the Governor of New Jersey, Jon Corzine, signed into law changes in the alimony statutes for his state which would bar alimony payments to parents who kill, abuse, or abandon their children.

== Taxation ==
In divorces and separation agreements signed on December 31, 2018, and earlier, alimony is tax-deductible for the payer, and treated as taxable income for the recipient. Pursuant to the Tax Cuts and Jobs Act of 2017, for divorce judgments dated January 1, 2019 and later, spousal support is treated as not-taxable and non-deductible for either party.

== Collection ==
A spouse trying to recover back alimony sometimes may use only the collection procedures that are available to all other creditors, such as reporting the amount due to a collection agency, or seek enforcement through contempt of court proceedings against an obligor who is able to pay but has failed to do so. Alimony obligations are not dischargeable in bankruptcy.
