= Adolph de Meyer =

French-born American celebrity photographer

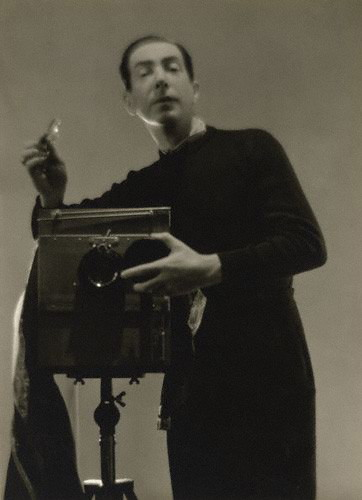
- Self-portrait
- Born: Adolphe Edouard Sigismond Meyer; 1 September 1868; Paris, France
- Died: 6 January 1946 (aged 77); Los Angeles, California, U.S.
- Resting place: Forest Lawn Memorial Park
- Occupation: Photographer
- Known for: Celebrity portrait photographs
- Spouse: Olga de Meyer (m. 1899; died 1931)

Baron Adolph de Meyer (1 September 1868 – 6 January 1946) was a French-born American photographer famed for his portraits in the early 20th century, many of which depicted celebrities such as Mary Pickford, Rita Lydig, Luisa Casati, Billie Burke, Irene Castle, John Barrymore, Lillian Gish, Ruth St. Denis, King George V, and Queen Mary. He was also the first official fashion photographer for the American magazine Vogue, appointed to that position in 1913.

== Background ==
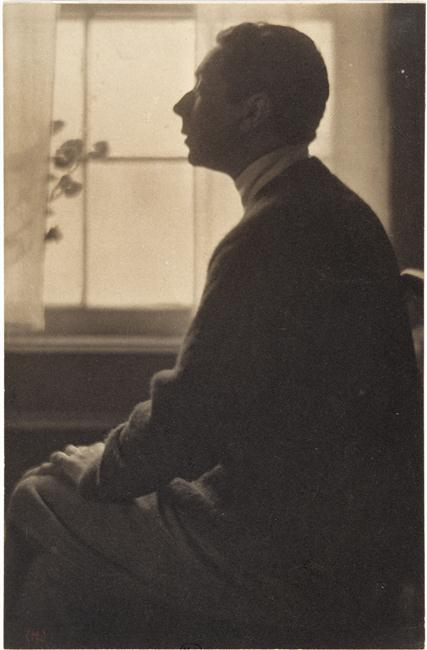
Adolf de Meyer c. 1904, by Clarence Hudson White (1871–1925)

Born in the 16th arrondissement of Paris and educated in Dresden, Germany, Adolphus Meyer was the son of a German Jewish father, Adolphus Louis Meyer, and Scottish mother, Adele Watson. He was baptised in Dresden in January 1869. In 1893, he joined the Royal Photographic Society and moved to London in 1895.

He used the surnames Meyer, von Meyer, de Meyer, de Meyer-Watson, and Meyer-Watson at various times in his life. From 1897, he was known as Baron Adolph Edward Sigismond de Meyer, though some contemporary sources list him as Baron Adolph von Meyer and Baron Adolph de Meyer-Watson.

In editions dating from 1898 until 1913, Whitaker's Peerage stated that de Meyer's title had been granted in 1897 by Frederick Augustus III of Saxony, and another source states "the photographer inherited it from his grandfather in the 1890s". Some sources state that no evidence of this nobiliary creation, however, has been found.

== Marriage ==
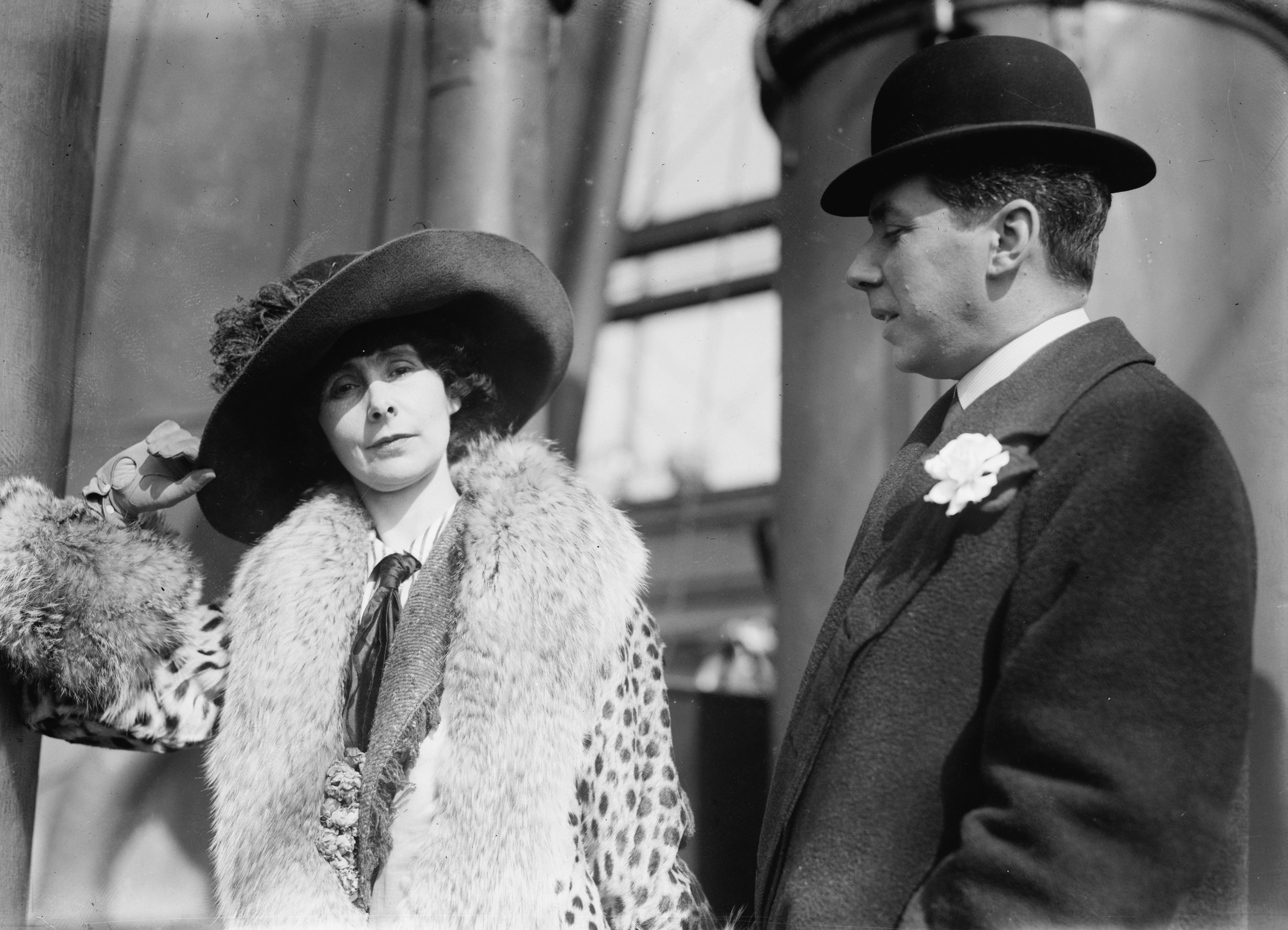
Baron and Baroness de Meyer

On 25 July 1899, at Holy Trinity Church, Sloane Street, Cadogan Square in London, England, de Meyer married Donna Olga Caracciolo, an Italian noblewoman who had been divorced earlier that year from Marino Brancaccio; some said she was a goddaughter of Edward VII. The couple reportedly met in 1897, at the home of a member of the Sassoon banking family, and Olga would be the subject of many of her husband's photographs.

The de Meyers' marriage was one of convenience rather than romantic love because the groom was homosexual and the bride was bisexual or lesbian. As Baron de Meyer wrote in an unpublished autobiographical novel, before they wed, he explained to Olga "the real meaning of love shorn of any kind of sensuality". He continued by observing, "Marriage based too much on love and unrestrained passion has rarely a chance to be lasting, whilst perfect understanding and companionship, on the contrary, generally make the most durable union".

After the death of his wife in 1931, Baron de Meyer became romantically involved with a young German, Ernest Frohlich (born circa 1914), whom he hired as his chauffeur and later adopted as his son. The latter went by the name Baron Ernest Frohlich de Meyer.

== Career ==
From 1898 to 1913, de Meyer lived in fashionable Cadogan Gardens, London. And from 1903 to 1907, his work was published in Alfred Stieglitz's quarterly Camera Work. Cecil Beaton dubbed him "the Debussy of photography". In 1912, he photographed Nijinsky in Paris. He immigrated to the United States in 1913.

In 1916, on the outbreak of World War I, de Meyers, took the new names of Mahrah and Gayne, on the advice of an astrologer. He applied for American citizenship in 1916, where his previous citizenship was indicated as German.

He became a photographer for Vogue from 1913 to 1921, and for Vanity Fair. During the World War I years, de Meyer brought to Vogue an Edwardian style featuring a rebellion against the rationality of the second industrial revolution and a fashion movement that was characterized as a queer counterculture.

In 1922, de Meyer accepted an offer to become the chief photographer and Parisian fashion correspondent for Harper's Bazaar in Paris, spending the next 12 years there.

On the eve of World War II, in 1938, de Meyer returned to the United States. Today, few of his prints survive, most having been destroyed during World War II but some 52 photographs of Olga, packed by his adopted son Ernest, came to light in 1988 and were published in 1992.

He died in Los Angeles on the anniversary of his wife's death, 6 January 1946, being registered as 'Gayne Adolphus Demeyer, writer (retired), and was buried at Forest Lawn Memorial Park in Glendale.

In 2017, the Metropolitan Museum of Art presented Quicksilver Brilliance: Adolf de Meyer Photographs, an exhibit of forty works spanning his career. Portraits of socialites such as Rita de Acosta Lydig and entertainer Josephine Baker were shown, as well as an album "documenting Nijinsky's scandalous 1912 ballet L'Après-midi d'un faune.”

== Gallery ==
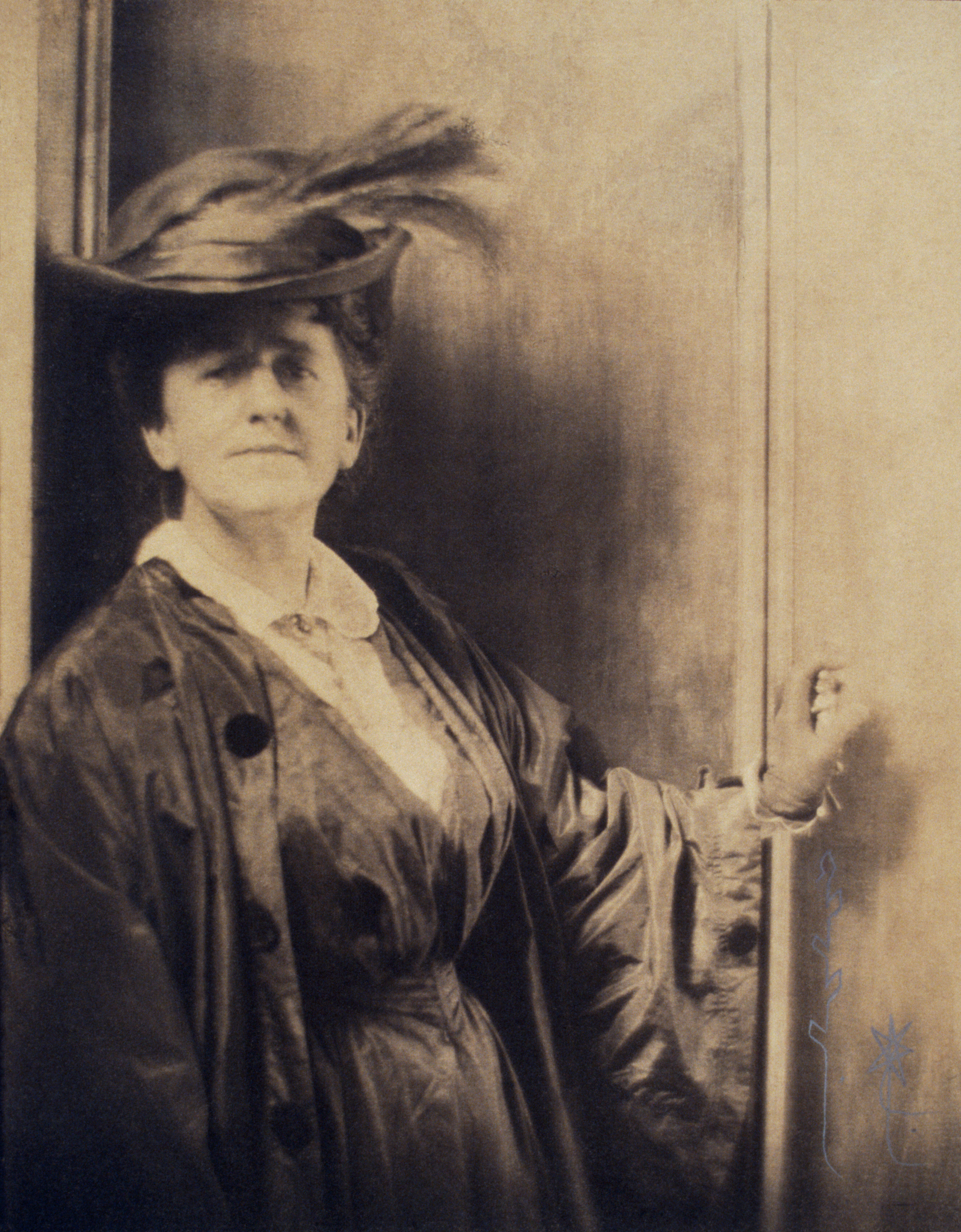
Gertrude Käsebier, c. 1900

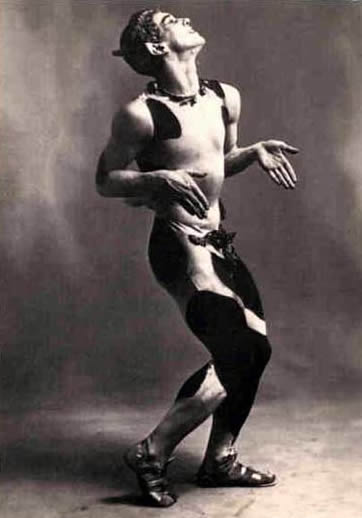
Vaslav Nijinsky, 1912

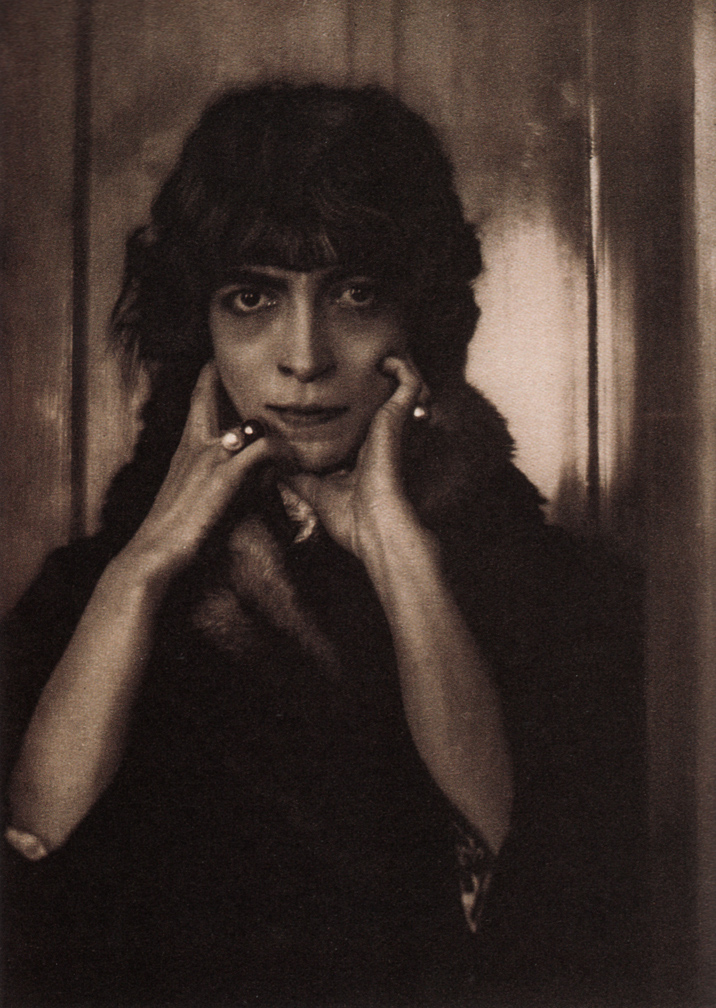
Luisa Casati, 1912

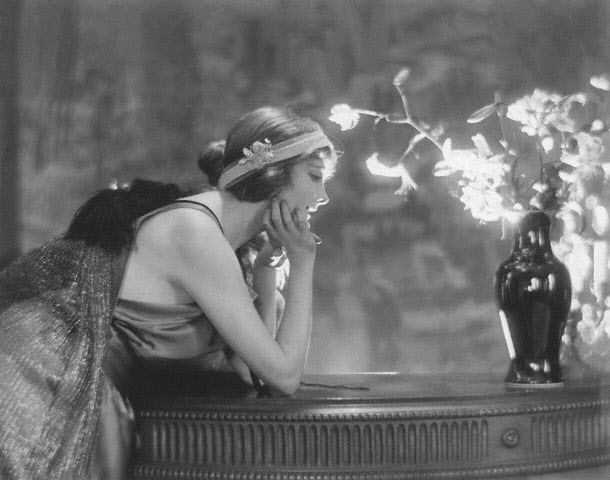
Jeanne Eagels wearing a cape over a dress in tulle with an ostrich ruff by Madeleine Chéruit, Paris fashion designer, 1921

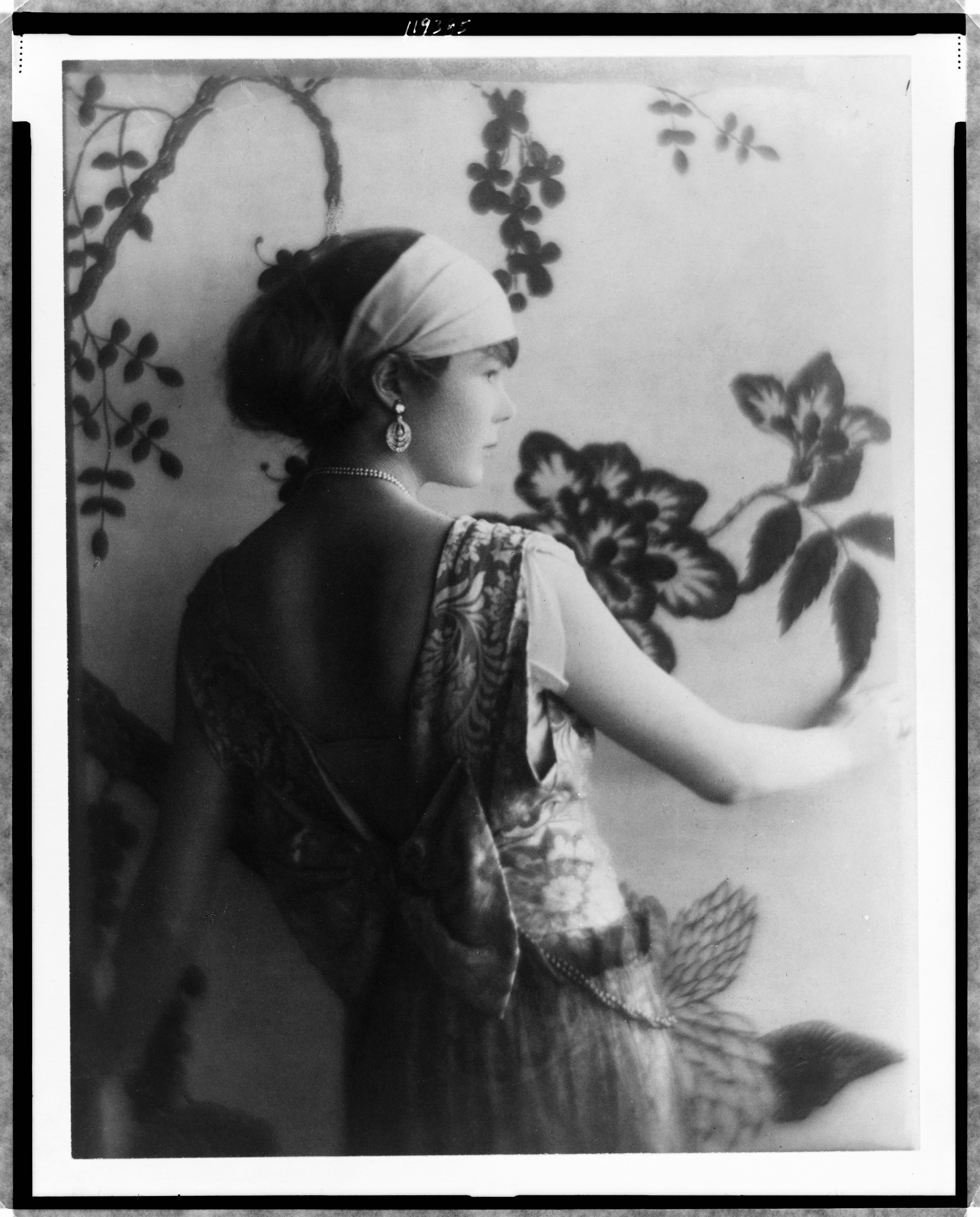
Portrait of a woman, 1920–1930

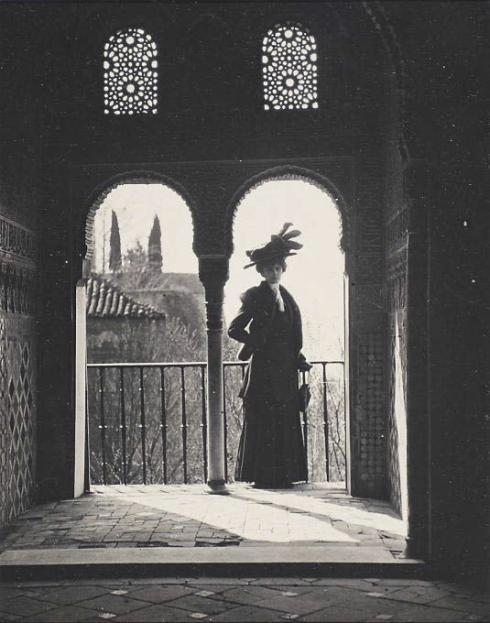
Woman in black in Mosque Archway, 1900s

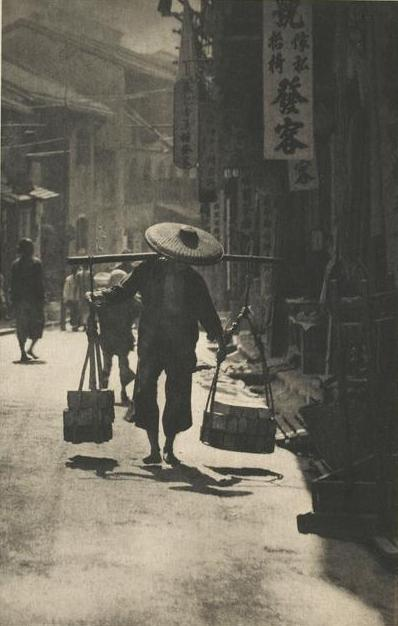
A street in China, Camera Work, 1912

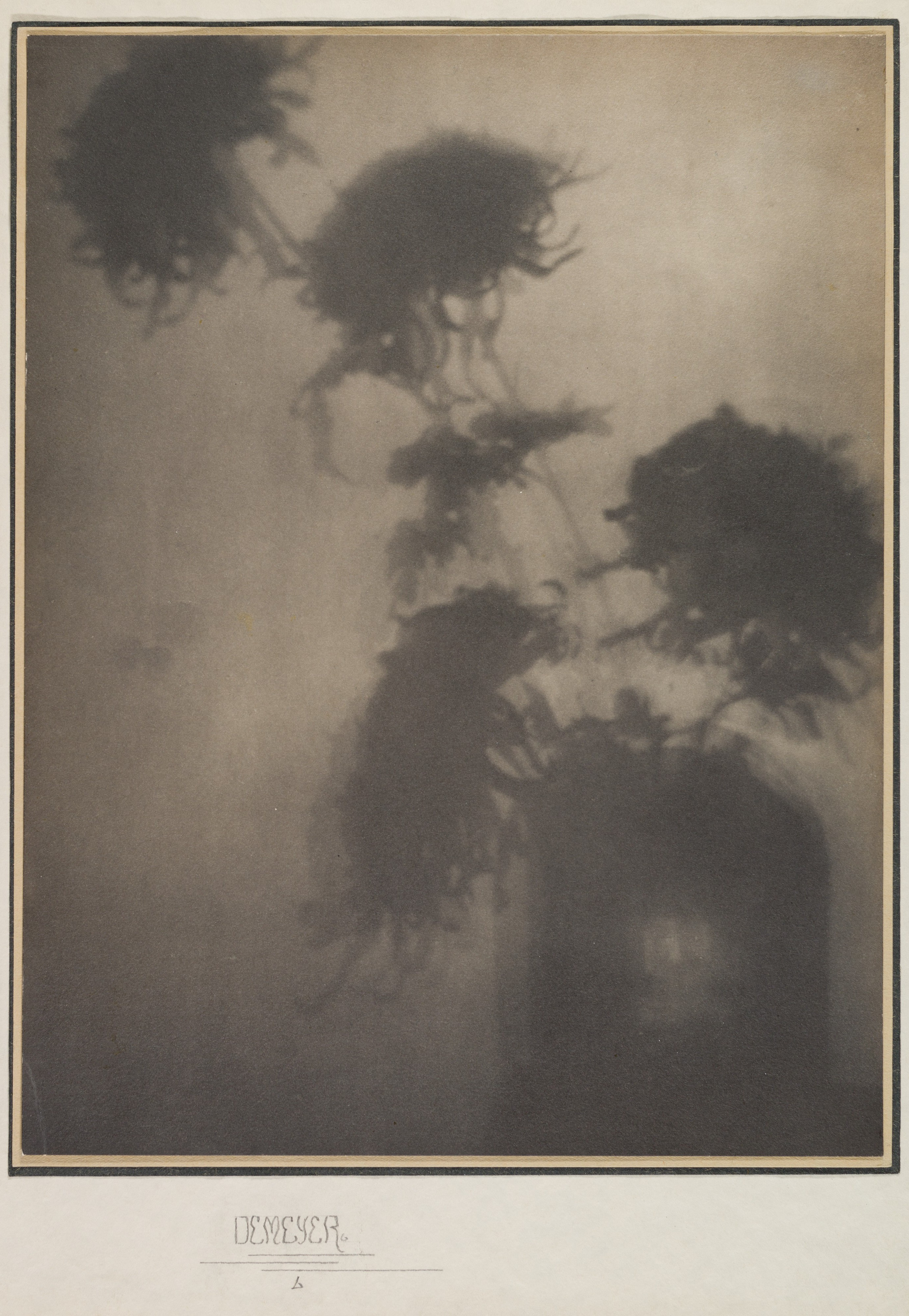
The Shadows on the Wall (Chrysanthemums), c.1906

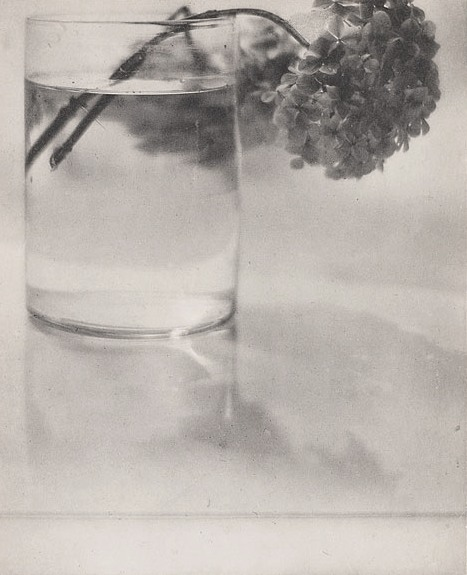
Hydrangea, 1907

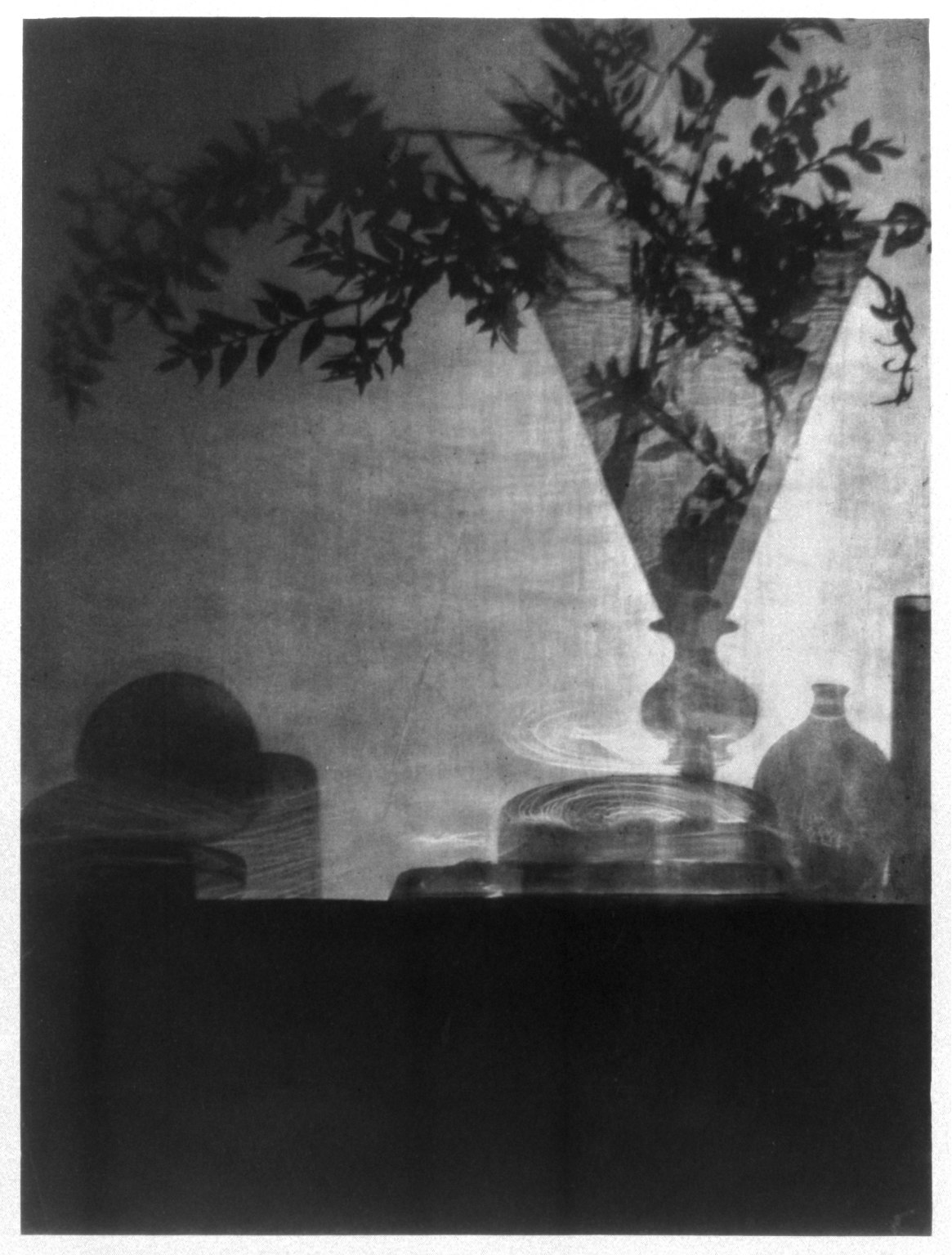
Glass and Shadows,1912

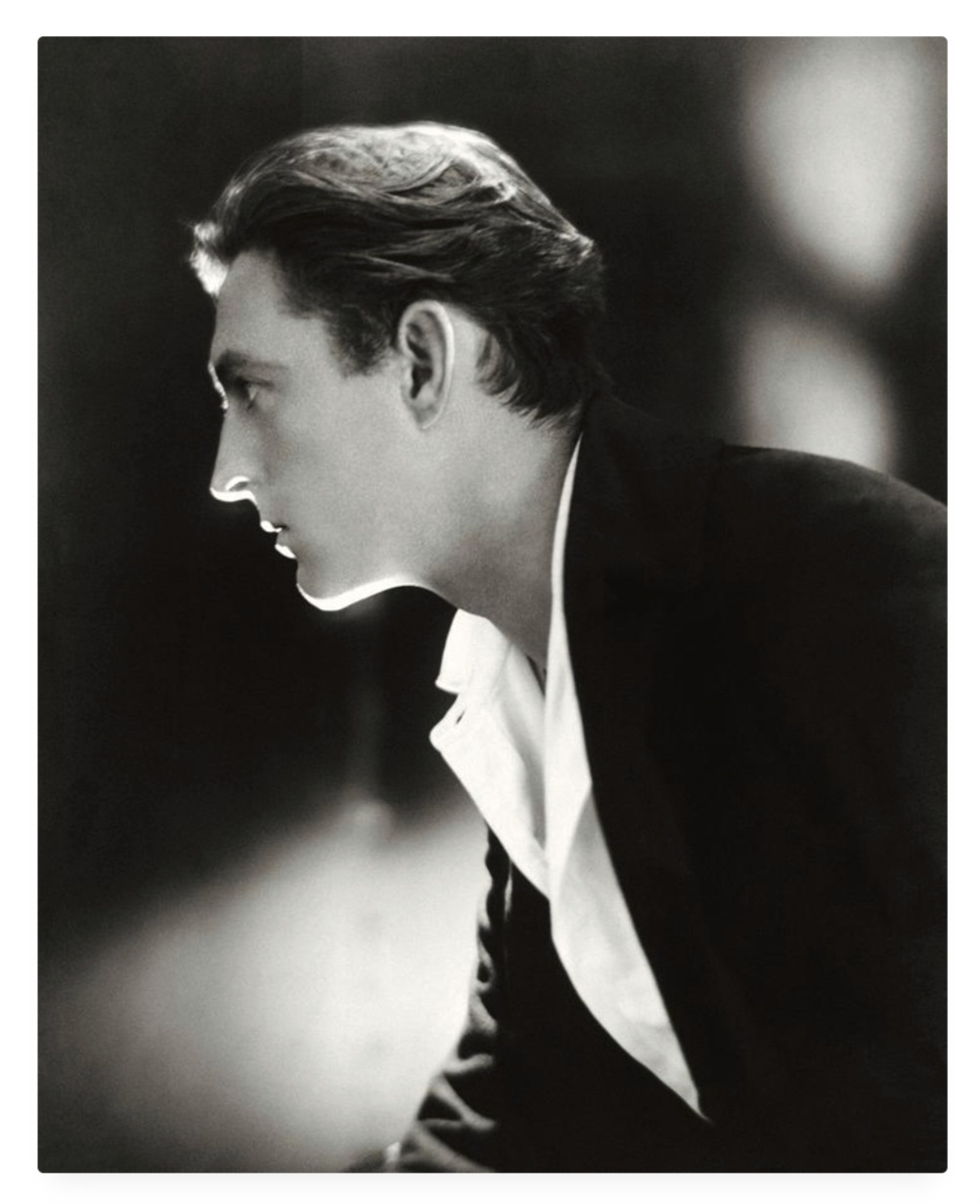
John Barrymore, 1920

== Sources ==
- Royal Mistresses and Bastards (2007) page 358 re Blanche, Duchess of Carraciolo and Olga de Meyer.
- Baron Adolf de Meyer
- Adolf de Meyer
