= Blow Your Own Horn (film) =

1923 film by James W. Horne

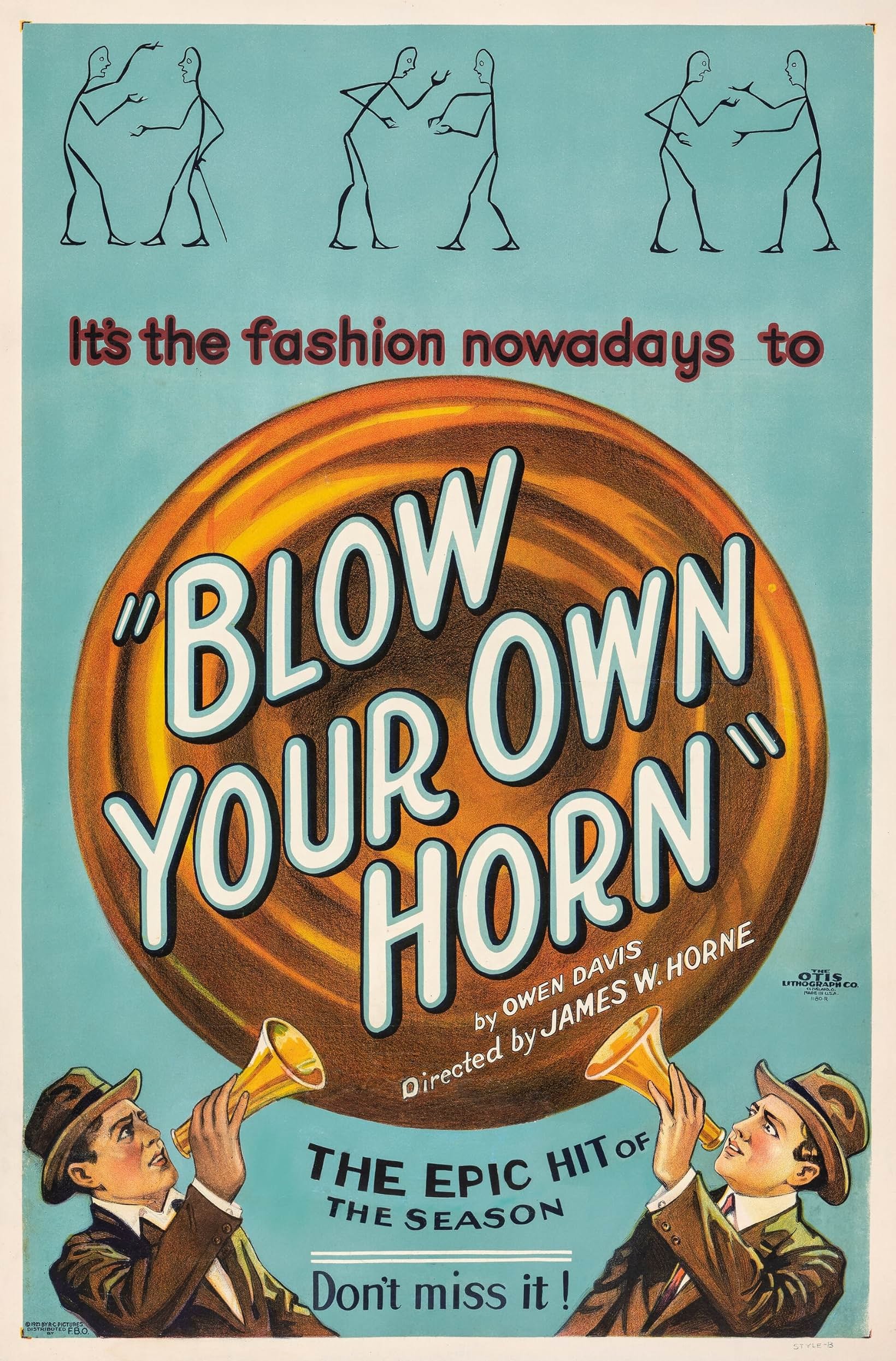
- Directed by: James W. Horne
- Written by: Owen Davis (play); Rex Taylor
- Starring: Warner Baxter; Ralph Lewis; Derelys Perdue
- Cinematography: Joseph A. Du Bray
- Production company: Robertson-Cole Pictures Corporation
- Distributed by: Film Booking Offices of America
- Release date: November 11, 1923
- Country: United States
- Languages: Silent; English intertitles

Blow Your Own Horn is a 1923 American silent comedy film directed by James W. Horne and starring Warner Baxter, Ralph Lewis, and Derelys Perdue.

== Cast ==
- Warner Baxter as Jack Dunbar
- Ralph Lewis as Nicholas Small
- Derelys Perdue as Anne Small
- Eugene Acker as Augustus Jolyon
- William H. Turner as Dinsmore Bevan
- Ernest C. Warde as Gillen Jolyon
- Johnny Fox as Buddy Dunbar
- Mary Jane Sanderson as Julia Yates
- Eugenie Forde as Mrs. Jolyon
- Dell Boone as Mrs. Gilroy Yates
- Billy Osborne as Percy Yates
- Stanhope Wheatcroft as Timonthy Cole

== Bibliography ==
- Munden, Kenneth White. The American Film Institute Catalog of Motion Pictures Produced in the United States, Part 1. University of California Press, 1997.
