= Grace Darmond =

Canadian-American actress (1893–1963)

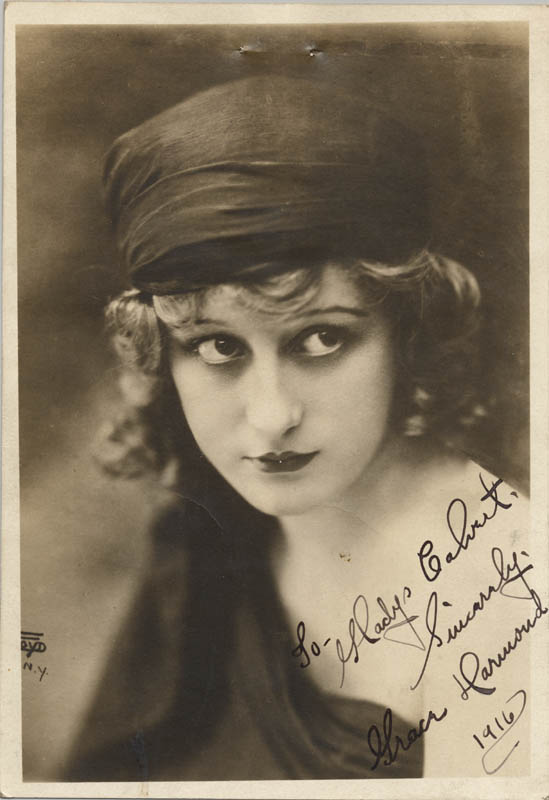
- Darmond in 1916
- Born: Grace Marie Glionna; November 20, 1893; Toronto, Ontario, Canada
- Died: October 8, 1963 (aged 69); Los Angeles, California, U.S.
- Years active: 1914–1927, 1941
- Spouses: Harvey Leon Madison (m. 1925; div. 1926) Randolph P. Jennings (m. 1928; div. 1932)
- Partner: Jean Acker (1918–1923)

Grace Darmond (born Grace Marie Glionna; November 20, 1893 – October 8, 1963) was a Canadian and American actress.

== Early life ==
Grace Marie Glionna was born in Toronto on November 20, 1893. Her parents were Vincent Baptiste "James" Glionna, an Italian-American barber and violinist who had lived in Canada since 1877, and Alice Louise Sparks Glionna, an Ontario native of Irish descent. Grace was baptised as a Roman Catholic on December 3, 1893, as Mary Gracie Glionna. The 1920 copy of Darmond's birth certificate gives her birth name as Grace Mary Glionna and her birth year as 1898. Vincent died in 1903, and Alice remarried in 1912 to Richard Johnson. After Vincent's death, Grace and her mother emigrated to the United States, settling in Chicago.

Grace Darmond in the 1919 film The Valley of the Giants.

== Career ==
As a teenager, Grace Glionna began to appear on the stage, changing her name to Grace Darmond. She signed with Selig Polyscope Company in 1914, and made her film debut in the comedy short The Clock Went Wrong.

Darmond was active onscreen from 1914 to 1927. She starred in the first Technicolor film, The Gulf Between (1917), with actor Niles Welch. The film premiered September 13 in Boston and September 21 at the Aeolian Hall in New York City. However, when the film went into limited release in early 1918 on a tour of eastern U. S. cities, it was a critical and commercial failure. The early Technicolor process ("System 1") was an additive colour technique that required a special projector, and it suffered from "fringing" and "haloing" of colours.

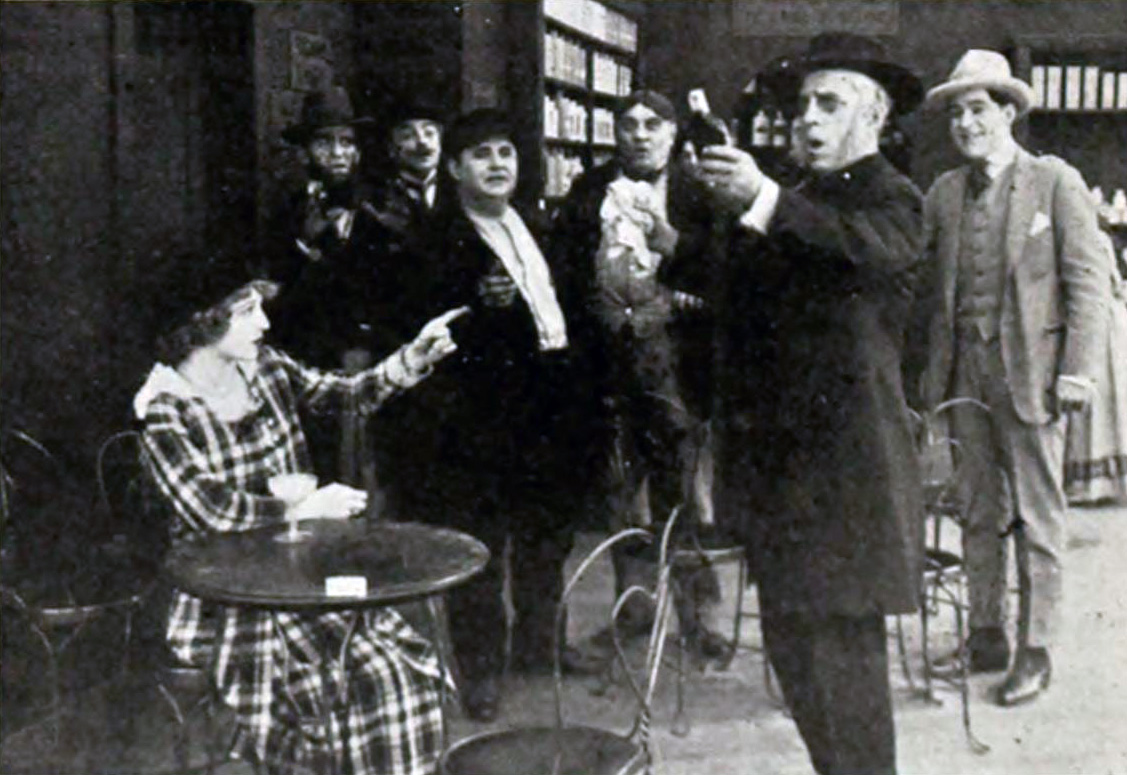
A Temperance Town (1916)

Darmond was pretty, slender and starred in many notable films of the period, but she never was able to break through as a leading actress in big budget films. Most of her roles were in support of bigger names of the time, and most of her starring roles were in smaller, lesser known films. She appeared in Below the Surface (1920), starring with Hobart Bosworth and Lloyd Hughes, and that same year played in A Dangerous Adventure, produced and directed by Warner Brothers. This led to her being cast alongside Boris Karloff in the mystery thriller The Hope Diamond Mystery (1921). In the July edition of Motion Picture Magazine, she was featured in an article by Joan Tully entitled "Mantled With Shyness (A Word Portrait of Grace Darmond)".

Her last notable film was Wide Open (1927), starring Lionel Belmore and Dick Grace. When the advent of talkies came about, Darmond, like so many actresses and actors from the silent film era, was not able to make a successful transition. She ended her acting career, and for the most part disappeared from the public eye until her death in 1963.

== Personal life ==
Darmond was reportedly a lesbian, but she has also been referred to as bisexual. Although performing in a substantial number of films over roughly 13 years, she was known in Hollywood's inner circle as the lover of actress Jean Acker, the first wife of actor Rudolph Valentino. Darmond also socialized, as did many struggling movie actresses of that era, with actress Alla Nazimova, who was allegedly a former lesbian lover of Jean Acker, although it has never been verified that Nazimova and Darmond were linked romantically. Darmond and Acker attended parties at Nazimova's Garden of Allah, an imposing house on Sunset Boulevard named after a Robert Smythe Hichens play in which Nazimova had appeared.

Darmond and Jean Acker met in 1918, and the two allegedly became lovers shortly thereafter. Acker met relatively unknown actor Rudolph Valentino only a few months later at a party at Nazimova's home. She and Valentino began dating, but reportedly never had sexual relations. They married in 1919, but on their wedding night, Acker fled the house and ran to Darmond's home, allegedly stating that it was Darmond whom she loved. The marriage is alleged to have never been consummated, and Acker filed for a legal separation in 1921; she later filed charges of bigamy against Valentino when he married designer Natacha Rambova in Mexico before his divorce from Acker was finalized. Darmond and Acker lived at 1337 Orange Drive in Los Angeles when Acker was married to Valentino, including the divorce trial period.

Darmond married Randolph P. Jennings, who worked in the oil industry, on January 22, 1928. The marriage ceremony was performed in Hollywood by a minister named James H. Lash, and witnessed by Lillian Willat (legal married name of actress Billie Dove) and Robert Fairbanks (possibly Robert Payne Ullman, who was known professionally as Robert Fairbanks, brother of the actor Douglas Elton Thomas Ullman, aka Douglas Fairbanks). The probable venue of the wedding was 7065 Hollywood Boulevard, which was the site of the Hollywood Congregational Church in the 1920s.

Darmond evidently lied about her age to her fiancé, as well as the county clerk, as she would have been at least 29 at the time the marriage licence was issued. There is an issue about whether she was born November 20, 1893, or November 20, 1898, but she could not possibly have been born as late as 1901. She clearly continued this subterfuge with her husband throughout their marriage, as she is listed as his wife, Grace D. Jennings, 28, on the 1930 census, which also reveals that the couple resided at 712 N. Beverly Drive, Beverly Hills, California, and that they had a butler named Chris W. Tandoc. The pair divorced in 1935.

Darmond died at the age of 69 in her apartment at 7850 W. Sunset Blvd. (formerly the San Ramon Apartments; later known as The Villa Rosa) in Hollywood. At the time, she was being treated for lung pain at the Motion Picture & Television Country Hospital in Woodland Hills, Los Angeles.

== Partial filmography ==
- A Pair of Stockings (1914, Short) - Mrs. Brainerd
- The Estrangement (1914, Short) - The Seymour Daughter
- When the Clock Went Wrong (1914, Short)
- Making Good with Her Family (1914, Short)
- An Egyptian Princess (1914, Short) - Mlle. Aimee - the Egyptian Princess
- The Lure of the Ladies (1914, Short)
- Your Girl and Mine: A Woman Suffrage Play (1914) - Equal Suffrage Apparition
- The Quarry (1915, Short) - Molly Bryan
- The Millionaire Baby (1915) - Valerie Carew
- A Texas Steer (1915) - Bossy Brander
- The House of a Thousand Candles (1915) - Marian Evans
- The Leaving of Lawrence (1915, Short) - Bessie Grant
- A Black Sheep (1915) - Ada Steele
- The Black Orchid (1916, Short) - Eleanor Roberts
- Her Dream of Life (1916, Short) - Rita Crossley
- A Social Deception (1916, Short) - Violet Rensselear
- Wives of the Rich (1916, Short) - Mrs. John Grant
- Badgered (1916, Short) - Vera Jackson
- A Stranger in New York (1916, Short) - Miss Weigh Innitt
- Temperance Town (1916, Short) - Ruth Jones
- The Shielding Shadow (1916) - Leontine
- The Gulf Between (1917) - Marie
- In the Balance (1917) - Louise Maurel
- The Other Man (1918) - Dorothy Harmon
- The Crucible of Life (1918) - Gladys Dale
- An American Live Wire (1918) - Ida Payne
- The Seal of Silence (1918) - Ruth Garden
- The Girl in His House (1918) - Doris Athelstone
- A Diplomatic Mission (1918) - Lady Diana Loring
- The Man Who Wouldn't Tell (1918) - Elinor Warden
- The Highest Trump (1919) - Lois Graham
- What Every Woman Wants (1919) - Gloria Graham
- The Valley of the Giants (1919) - Shirley Sumner
- The Hawk's Trail (1919) - Claire Drake
- Below the Surface (1920) - Edna Gordon
- The Invisible Divorce (1920) - Claire Kane Barry
- So Long Letty (1920) - Letty Robbins
- The Hope Diamond Mystery (1921) - Mary Hilton / Bibi
- See My Lawyer (1921) - Norma Joyce
- White and Unmarried (1921) - Dorothea Welter
- The Beautiful Gambler (1921) - Molly Hanlon
- The Song of Life (1922) - Aline Tilden
- Handle with Care (1922) - Jeanne Lee
- I Can Explain (1922) - Dorothy Dawson
- A Dangerous Adventure (1922, Serial) - Marjorie Stanton
- The Hero (1923)
- The Midnight Guest (1923) - Gabrielle
- Daytime Wives (1923) - Francine Adams
- Gold Madness (1923) - Hester Stanton
- The Wheel of Fortune (1923)
- Discontented Husbands (1924) - Emily Ballard
- Alimony (1924) - Marion Mason
- The Gaiety Girl (1924) - Pansy Gale
- The Painted Flapper (1924)
- Flattery (1925) - Allene King
- Where the Worst Begins (1925) - Annice Van Dornn
- The Great Jewel Robbery (1925) - Doris Dunbar
- Her Big Adventure (1926) - Betty Burton
- The Night Patrol (1926) - Goldie Ferguson
- Honesty – The Best Policy (1926) - Lily
- Her Man o' War (1926) - Countess of Lederbon
- The Marriage Clause (1926) - Mildred Le Blanc
- Wide Open (1927)
- Hour of Reckoning (1927) - Marion Hastings
- Wages of Conscience (1927) - Lillian Bradley / Mary Knowles
- Our Wife (1941) - Minor Role (uncredited) (final film role)
