= Carl Gantvoort =

American actor (1883–1935)

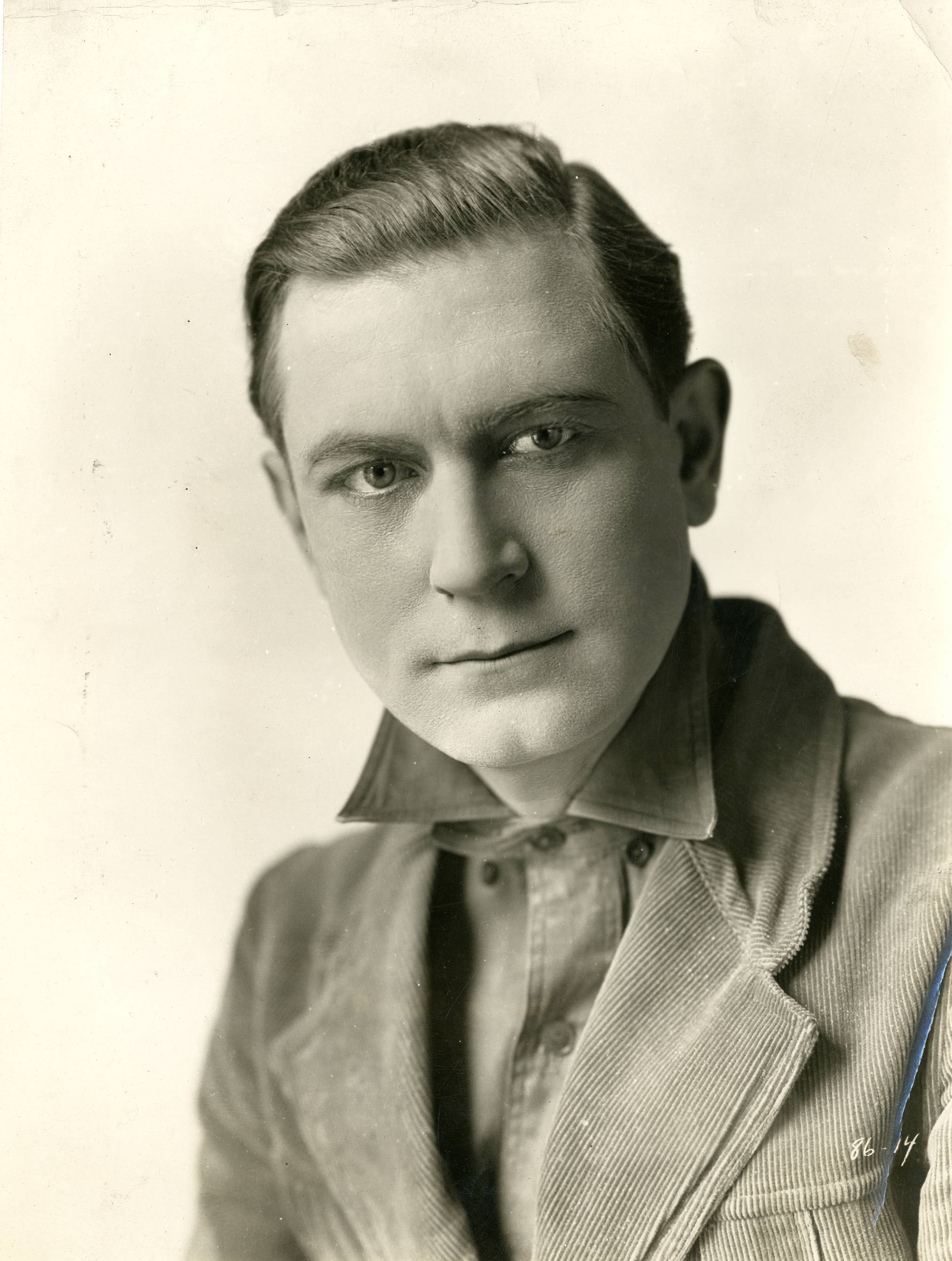
- Gantvoort in 1922
- Born: 1883; Bowling Green, Kentucky, U.S.
- Died: September 28, 1935 (aged 51–52); Los Angeles, California, U.S.
- Occupation: Actor
- Years active: 1912–1922

Carl Gantvoort (1883 – September 28, 1935*) was an opera singer stage and screen actor in the United States. He starred in The Gray Dawn (1922).

He attended the University of Cincinnati.

His theatrical performances included a role as Little John in a 1912 production of Robin Hood. He also had roles in Little Simplicity, The Maid of the Mountains, The Riviera Girl, Pom-pom as Bertrand, Iole as George Wayne, and The Geisha.

== Personal life ==
His father, Arnold J. Gantvoort, was manager of CCM and taught classes. His mother was Nettie Looker, granddaughter of Othniel Looker. He had 6 siblings: Hermann, Gertrude, Bertha, Brunhilde, Elsa, and Helen.

He was married to Anne Brussert, who he met when she was performing a play in Ohio. They married after he completed college and divorced in 1922.

== Death ==
News reports about his death in Los Angeles state he was found unconscious in the street with a skull fracture and they mention different dates, namely 28, 29 or 30 of September 1935. It was speculated that he might have been robbed or hit by a car, relatives said he suffered with fainting spells. An inquest was closed with an open verdict by a coroner's jury who could not determine cause of death. Another report simply states he died of a heart attack.

== Filmography ==
- Man of the Forest (1921), a Western
- The Mysterious Rider (1921 film) (1921)
- A Certain Rich Man (1921)
- The Lure of Egypt (1921)
- When Romance Rides (1922)
- The Gray Dawn (1922)
- Heart's Haven (1922)
- Golden Dreams (1922)

== Gallery ==
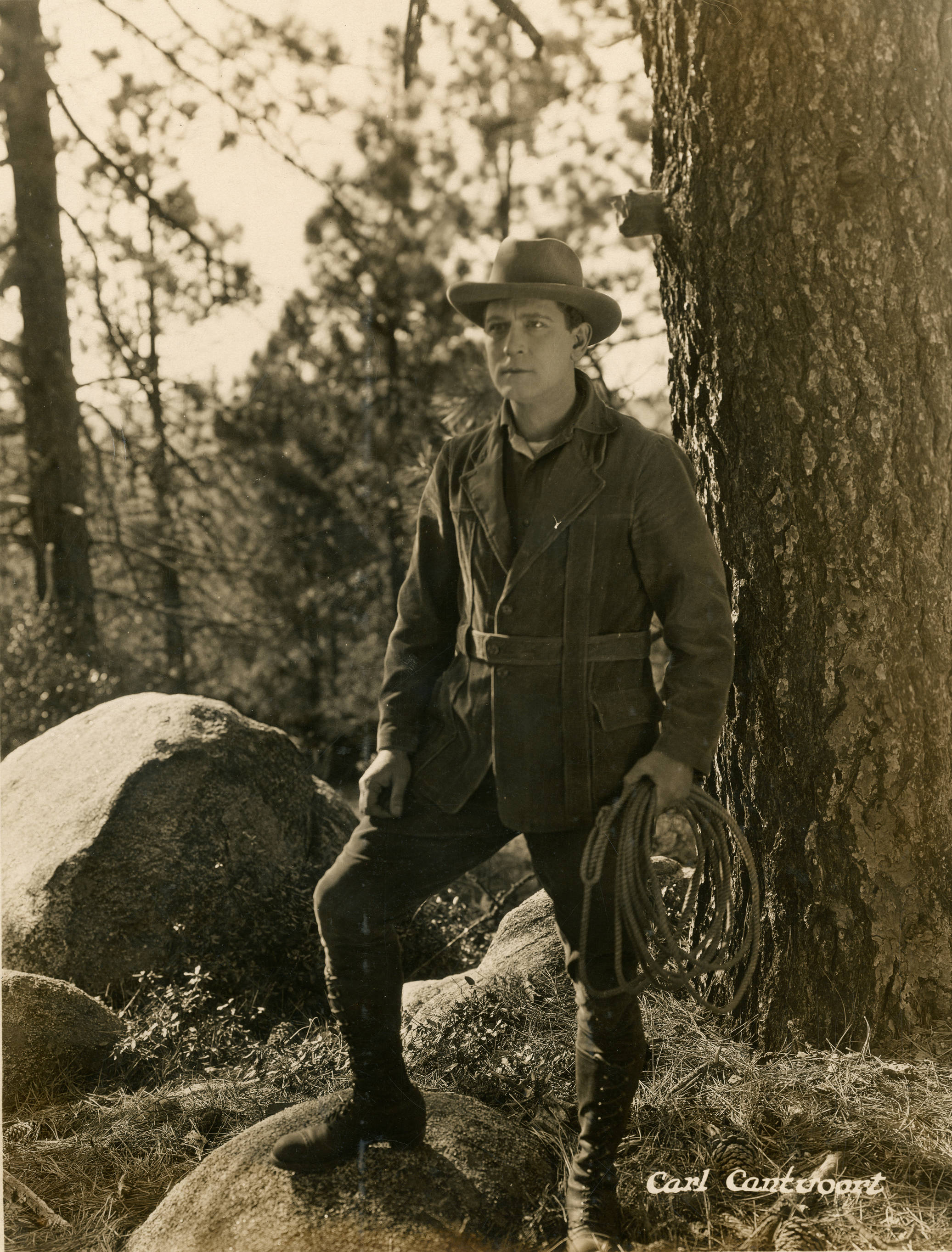
Playbill for A Certain Rich Man (1921)

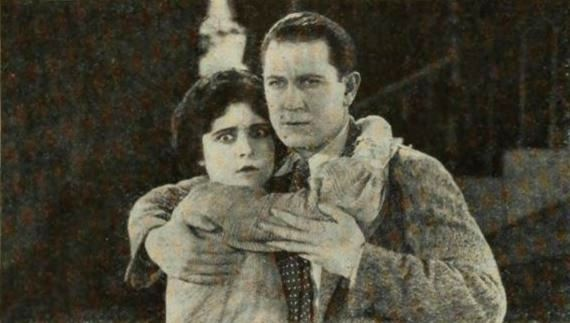
With Claire Adams in Golden Dreams (1922)

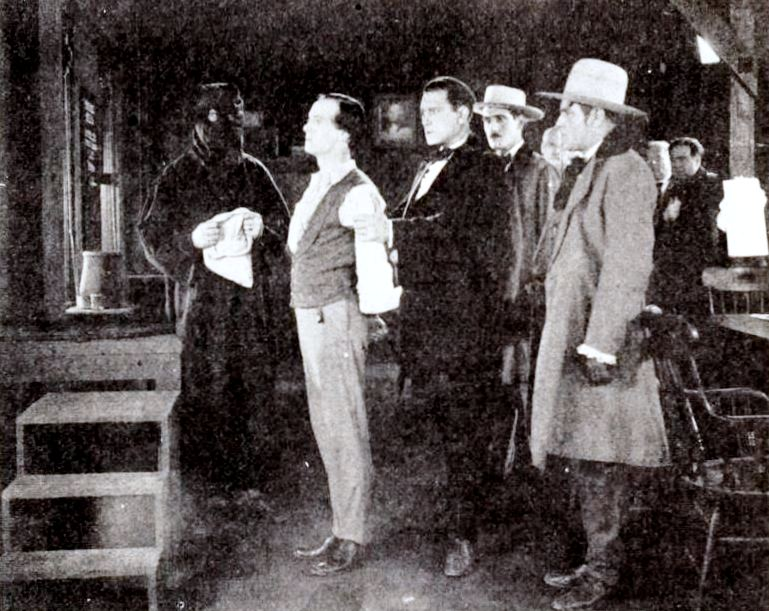
Still with Gantvoort in it from The Gray Dawn
