= The Mysterious Rider =

The Mysterious Rider may refer to:

- The Mysterious Rider (1921), a western novel by Zane Grey
- The Mysterious Rider (1921 film), an American Western silent film directed by Benjamin B. Hampton that was based on the novel
- The Mysterious Rider (1927 film), an American Western silent film directed by John Waters that was based on the novel
- The Mysterious Rider (1933 film), an American Western film directed by Fred Allen
- The Mysterious Rider (1938 film), an American Western film directed by Lesley Selander that was based on the novel
- The Mysterious Rider (1942 film), an American Western film directed by Sam Newfield
- The Mysterious Rider (1948 film), English title for Il cavaliere misterioso, an Italian historical-adventure film directed by Riccardo Freda
