= A Certain Rich Man =

1921 silent film

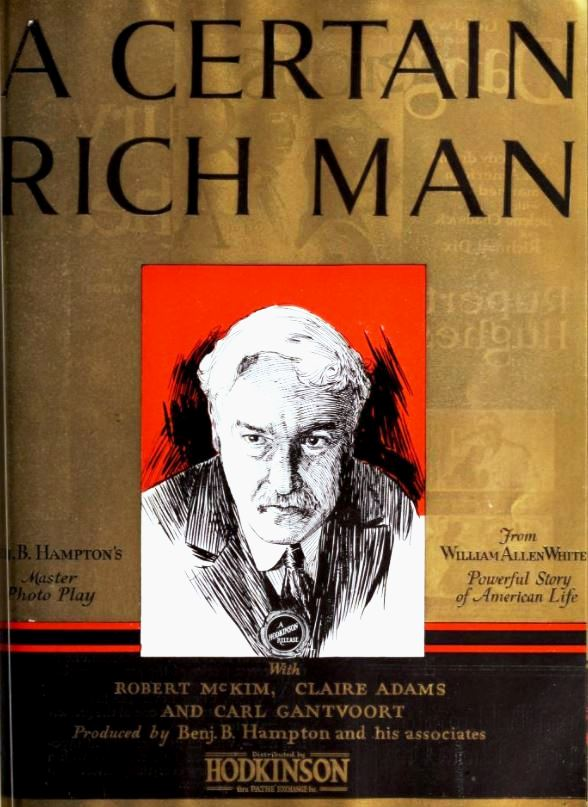
- Directed by: Howard Hickman
- Written by: William Allen White
- Produced by: Elliott J. Clawson; Benjamin B. Hampton
- Starring: Carl Gantvoort; Claire Adams; Robert McKim
- Cinematography: Joseph A. Dubray
- Production company: Great Authors Pictures
- Distributed by: Hodkinson Pictures
- Release date: May 28, 1921
- Running time: 60 minutes
- Country: United States
- Languages: Silent; English intertitles

A Certain Rich Man is a 1921 American silent drama film directed by Howard Hickman and starring Carl Gantvoort, Claire Adams and Robert McKim. It is adapted from the popular 1909 novel of the same name by William Allen White.

== Cast ==
- Carl Gantvoort as Bob Hendricks
- Claire Adams as Molly Culpepper
- Robert McKim as John Barclay
- Jean Hersholt as Adrian Brownwell
- Joseph J. Dowling as Col. Martin Culpepper
- Lydia Knott as John Carclay's Mother
- Frankie Lee as Young Neal Ward
- Mary Jane Irving as Young Janet Barclay
- Harry Lorraine as Gen. Hendricks
- J. Gunnis Davis as Lige Bemis
- Charles Colby as Watts McHurdie
- Walter Perry as Jake Dolan
- Fleming Pitts as Mose
- Grace Pike as Col. Culpepper's Wife
- Eugenia Gilbert as Janet Barclay
- Gordon Dumont as Neal Ward
- Edna Pennington as Mrs. Jane Barclay

== Bibliography ==
- Munden, Kenneth White. The American Film Institute Catalog of Motion Pictures Produced in the United States, Part 1. University of California Press, 1997.
