= The Spenders =

1921 film directed by Jack Conway

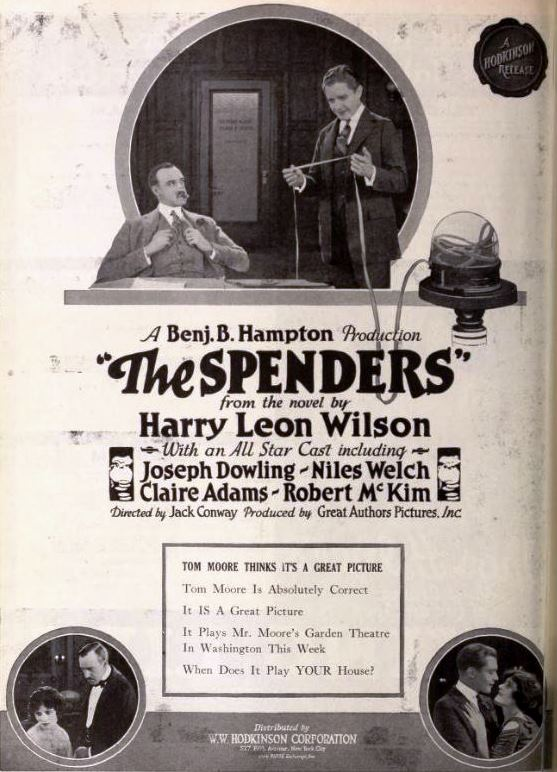
- Directed by: Jack Conway
- Written by: Harry Leon Wilson (novel); Richard Schayer
- Produced by: Benjamin B. Hampton
- Starring: Claire Adams; Robert McKim; Joseph J. Dowling
- Cinematography: Enrique Juan Vallejo; Fowler H. Sturgis
- Production company: Benjamin B. Hampton Productions
- Distributed by: Pathé Exchange; W. W. Hodkinson Corporation
- Release date: January 1921
- Country: United States
- Languages: Silent; English intertitles

The Spenders is a 1921 American silent comedy film directed by Jack Conway and starring Claire Adams, Robert McKim and Joseph J. Dowling.

== Premise ==
At the death of Daniel Bines, a millionaire from Montana City, his fortune partially goes to his children Percy and Psyche. Both decide to use their money to go to New York City.

== Cast ==
- Claire Adams as Avice Milbrey
- Robert McKim as Rulon Shepler
- Joseph J. Dowling as Uncle Peter Bines
- Niles Welch as P. Percival Bines
- Betty Brice as Psyche Bines
- Adele Farrington as Mrs. Bines
- Virginia Harris as Mrs. Ashelstane
- Tom Ricketts as Mr. Milbrey
- Otto Lederer as Abe Trummel
- Harold Holland as Lord Mauburn

== Bibliography ==
- Goble, Alan. The Complete Index to Literary Sources in Film. Walter de Gruyter, 1999.
