= Benjamin Hampton =

Benjamin Hampton may refer to:

- Ben Hampton (born 1992), Australian rugby player
- Benjamin B. Hampton (1875–1932), American film producer
