= Moneychangers =

Moneychangers may refer to:

- The Moneychangers, a 1975 novel by Arthur Hailey
- Money changer, a person or organization that exchanges the currency of one country for that of another
- The Money Changers, a 1920 American silent film
- The Moneychanger, a 2019 Uruguayan film
