= The Iced Bullet =

1917 film directed by Reginald Barker

- Directed by: Reginald Barker
- Written by: C. Gardner Sullivan
- Produced by: Thomas H. Ince
- Starring: William Desmond; Robert McKim; J. Barney Sherry
- Cinematography: Robert Newhard
- Production companies: Kay-Bee Pictures; New York Motion Picture
- Distributed by: Triangle Distributing
- Release date: January 21, 1917
- Running time: 50 minutes
- Country: United States
- Languages: Silent; English intertitles

The Iced Bullet is a 1917 American silent mystery film directed by Reginald Barker and starring William Desmond, Robert McKim and J. Barney Sherry. The film's sets were designed by the art director Robert Brunton.

== Cast ==
- William Desmond as The Author / Horace Lee
- Robert McKim as Donald Greene
- J. Barney Sherry as Richard Deering
- Margaret Thompson as Evelyn Deering
- Joseph J. Dowling as The Butler
- Jerome Storm as Butler's Son
- Louis Durham as Joe
- J. Frank Burke as The Specialist
- Reginald Barker as Self
- C. Gardner Sullivan as Self

== Bibliography ==
- Langman, Larry. American Film Cycles: The Silent Era. Greenwood Publishing, 1998.
