= The Money Changers =

1920 film by Jack Conway

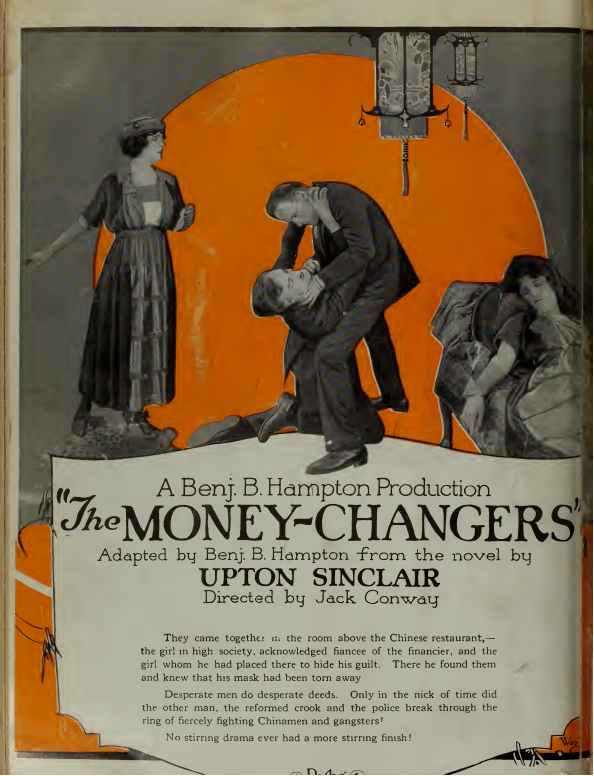
- Directed by: Jack Conway
- Written by: William Clifford; Benjamin B. Hampton
- Based on: The Money Changers by Upton Sinclair
- Produced by: Benjamin B. Hampton
- Starring: Robert McKim; Claire Adams; Roy Stewart
- Cinematography: Enrique Juan Vallejo
- Production company: Benjamin B. Hampton Productions
- Distributed by: Pathé Exchange
- Release date: October 31, 1920
- Running time: 6 reels
- Country: United States
- Language: Silent (English intertitles)

The Money Changers is a 1920 American silent drama film directed by Jack Conway and starring Robert McKim, Claire Adams, and Roy Stewart. It is based on a 1908 novel by Upton Sinclair.

== Cast ==
- Robert McKim as Hugh Gordon
- Claire Adams as Lucy Hegan
- Roy Stewart as Allan Martin
- Audrey Chapman as Mary Holmes
- George Webb as Monk Mullen
- Betty Brice as Maggie O'Brien
- Edward Peil Sr. as Ling Choo Fong
- Harvey Clark as Chow Chin
- Harry Tenbrook as Chink Murphy
- Stanton Heck as George Conley
- Zack Williams as Wesley Shiloh Mainwaring
- George Hernandez as James Hegan
- Gertrude Claire as Mrs. Mullen
- Laddie Earle as Jimmy Mullen

== Reception ==
The film industry created the National Association of the Motion Picture Industry (NAMPI) in 1916 in an effort to preempt censorship by states and municipalities, and it used a list of subjects called the "Thirteen Points" which film plots were to avoid. The Money Changers, with its white slavery plot line, is an example of a film that clearly violated the Thirteen Points and yet was still distributed. Since the NAMPI was ineffective, it was replaced in 1922.

== Bibliography ==
- James Robert Parish & Michael R. Pitts. Film Directors: a Guide to their American Films. Scarecrow Press, 1974. ISBN 0-8108-0752-1
