= Riders of the Dawn (1920 film) =

1920 film

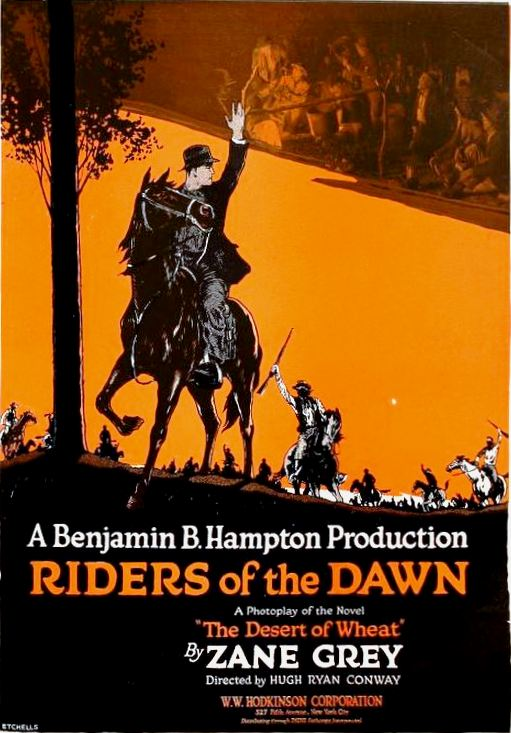
- Directed by: Jack Conway
- Written by: Zane Grey (novel); L. V. Jefferson; William Clifford
- Produced by: Benjamin B. Hampton
- Starring: Roy Stewart; Claire Adams; Joseph J. Dowling
- Cinematography: Enrique Juan Vallejo
- Production company: Zane Grey Pictures
- Distributed by: Pathé Exchange; W. W. Hodkinson Corporation
- Release date: May 2, 1920
- Running time: 6 reels
- Country: United States
- Languages: Silent; English intertitles

Riders of the Dawn is a 1920 American silent Western film directed by Jack Conway and starring Roy Stewart, Claire Adams, and Joseph J. Dowling.

== Cast ==
- Roy Stewart as Kurt Dorn
- Claire Adams as Lenore Anderson
- Joseph J. Dowling as Tom Anderson
- Robert McKim as Henry Neuman
- Marie Messinger as Kathleen
- Violet Schram as Olga
- Arthur Morrison as Olsen
- Marc B. Robbins as Chris Dorn
- Fred Starr as Nash
- Frank Brownlee as Glidden

== Bibliography ==
- James Robert Parish & Michael R. Pitts. Film Directors: A Guide to Their American Films. Scarecrow Press, 1974.
