= Just Tony =

1922 film

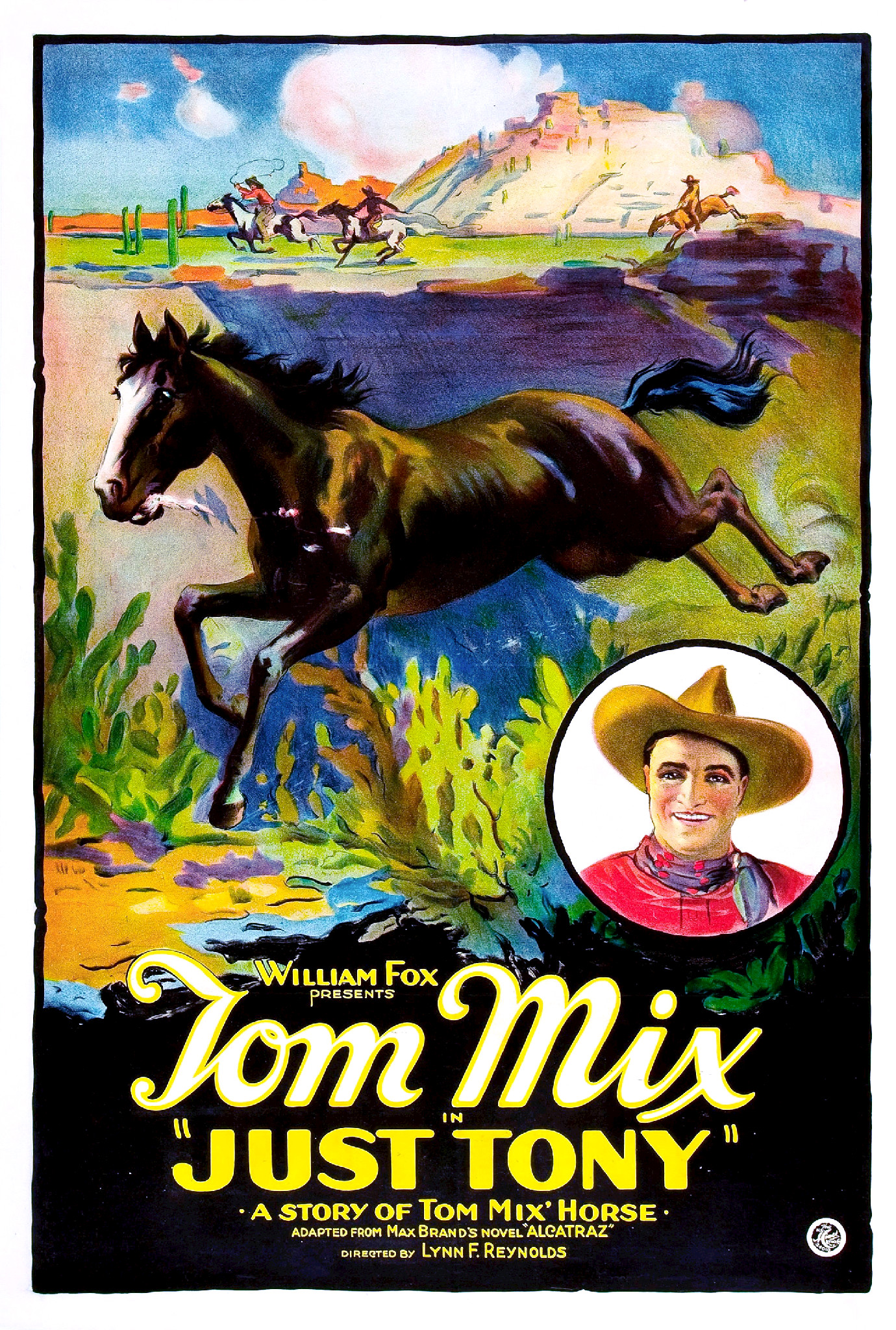
- Directed by: Lynn Reynolds
- Written by: Lynn Reynolds
- Based on: Alcatraz by Max Brand
- Produced by: William Fox
- Starring: Tom Mix; Claire Adams; Frank Campeau
- Cinematography: Daniel B. Clark
- Production company: Fox Film Corporation
- Distributed by: Fox Film Corporation
- Release date: August 20, 1922
- Running time: 70 minutes
- Country: United States
- Languages: Silent; English intertitles

Just Tony is a 1922 American silent Western film directed by Lynn Reynolds and starring Tom Mix, Claire Adams and Frank Campeau. It is based on the novel Alcatraz by Max Brand. It portrays a wild mustang who slowly comes to trust the cowboy who attempts to tame him.

== Cast ==
- Tom Mix as Jim Perris
- J.P. Lockney as Oliver Jordan
- Claire Adams as Marianne Jordan
- Frank Campeau as Lew Hervey
- Duke R. Lee as Manuel Cordova
- Walt Robbins as Shorty
- Tony the Wonder Horse as Tony - A Wild Horse

== Preservation ==
A 16mm print of the film is held by George Eastman House.

== Bibliography ==
- Connelly, Robert B. The Silents: Silent Feature Films, 1910-36, Volume 40, Issue 2. December Press, 1998.
- Munden, Kenneth White. The American Film Institute Catalog of Motion Pictures Produced in the United States, Part 1. University of California Press, 1997.
- Solomon, Aubrey. The Fox Film Corporation, 1915-1935: A History and Filmography. McFarland, 2011.
