= The Man of the Forest (1921 film) =

1921 film

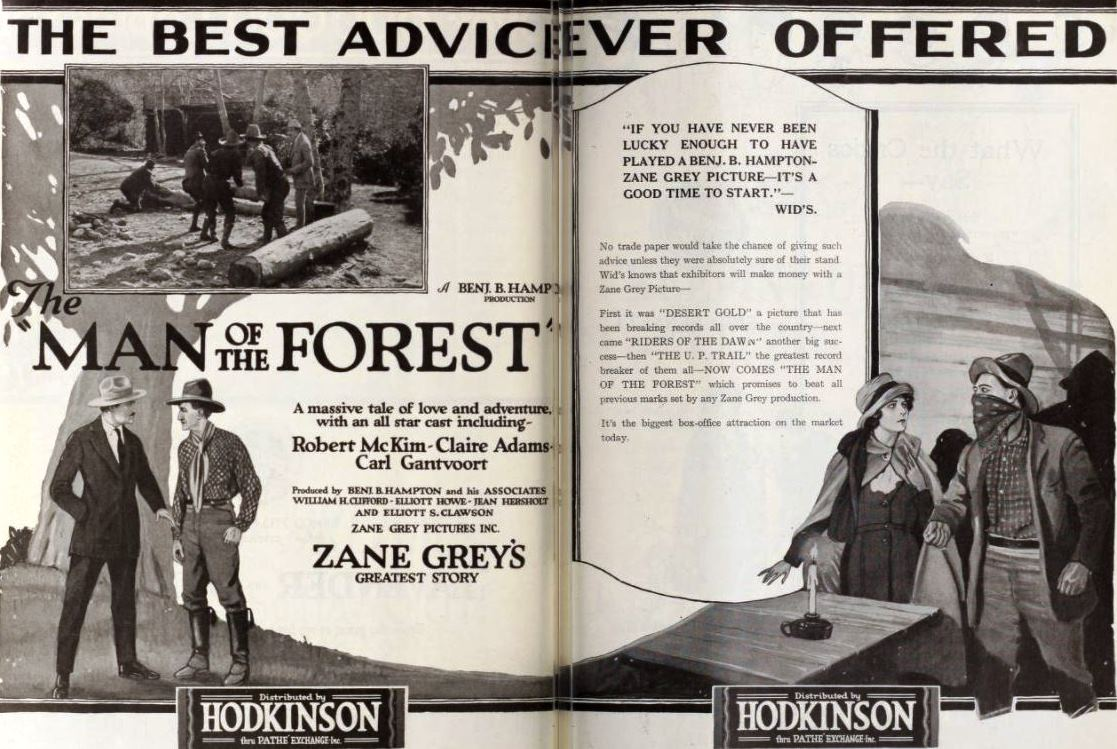
- Directed by: Howard Hickman
- Written by: William Clifford; Richard Schayer
- Based on: The Man of the Forest by Zane Grey
- Produced by: Benjamin B. Hampton
- Starring: Carl Gantvoort; Claire Adams; Robert McKim
- Cinematography: Joseph A. Dubray
- Production company: Zane Grey Pictures
- Distributed by: Hodkinson Pictures
- Release date: June 1921
- Running time: 70 minutes
- Country: United States
- Languages: Silent; English intertitles

Man of the Forest is a 1921 American silent Western film directed by Howard Hickman and starring Carl Gantvoort, Claire Adams and Robert McKim.

== Cast ==
- Carl Gantvoort as Milt Dale
- Claire Adams as Helen Raynor
- Robert McKim as Harvey Riggs
- Jean Hersholt as Lem Beasley
- Harry Lorraine as Al Auchincloss
- Eugenia Gilbert as Bessie Beasley
- Frank Hayes as Los Vegas
- Charlotte Pierce as Bo Raynor
- Charles Murphy as Snake Anson
- Fred Starr as Jim Wilson
- Tote Du Crow as Lone Wolf

== Bibliography ==
- Munden, Kenneth White. The American Film Institute Catalog of Motion Pictures Produced in the United States, Part 1. University of California Press, 1997.
