= Quicksand (1918 film) =

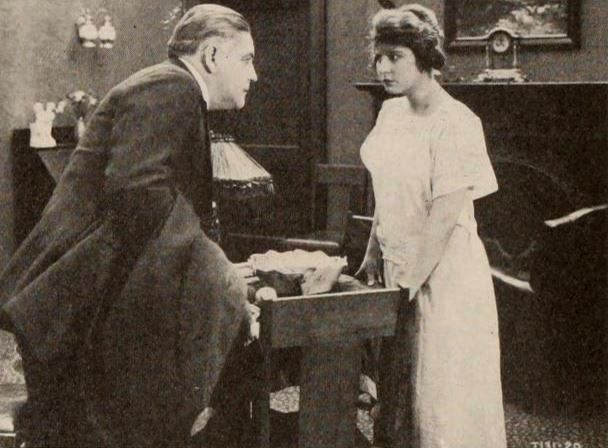
- Still with Barrows and Dalton
- Directed by: Victor Schertzinger
- Screenplay by: John Lynch; R. Cecil Smith
- Produced by: Thomas H. Ince
- Starring: Henry A. Barrows; Edward Coxen; Dorothy Dalton; Frankie Lee; Philo McCullough
- Cinematography: John Stumar
- Production company: Thomas H. Ince Corporation
- Distributed by: Paramount Pictures
- Release date: December 22, 1918
- Running time: 50 minutes
- Country: United States
- Language: Silent (English intertitles)

Quicksand is a lost 1918 American silent drama film directed by Victor Schertzinger and written by John Lynch and R. Cecil Smith. The film stars Henry A. Barrows, Edward Coxen, Dorothy Dalton, Frankie Lee, and Philo McCullough. The film was released on December 22, 1918, by Paramount Pictures.

== Plot ==
As described in a film magazine, Mary is married to Jim Bowen, a trusted cashier for insurance brokers. John Boland is a district leader and the keeper of a cafe frequented by Alan Perry, the wastral son of Bowen's employer. Perry obtains Bowen's endorsement on a fraudulent check and Bowen is arrested, convicted, and sentenced to five years imprisonment. Mary believes her husband is innocent and, suspecting Perry, she applies with Boland to be a singer in his cafe. Boland secretly loves her and hopes that she will obtain a divorce from her convict husband and marry him. Perry becomes infatuated with her and one night follows her home. Meanwhile, her husband has escaped from prison and seeks refuge in his home. Boland, warned of Bowen's escape, notifies the police and the home is surrounded. Boland arrives to find Mary struggling with Perry, and when he attempts to rescue her he is struck down and apparently killed by Perry. Threatening to turn him over to the police for murder, Mary extracts a confession of the fraud from Bowen. The police break into the house and arrest Perry, while the recovered Boland becomes surety for Bowen.

== Cast ==
- Henry A. Barrows as John Boland
- Edward Coxen as Jim Bowen
- Dorothy Dalton as Mary Bowen
- Frankie Lee as Frankie Bowen
- Philo McCullough as Alan Perry
