= Within the Cup =

1918 silent film

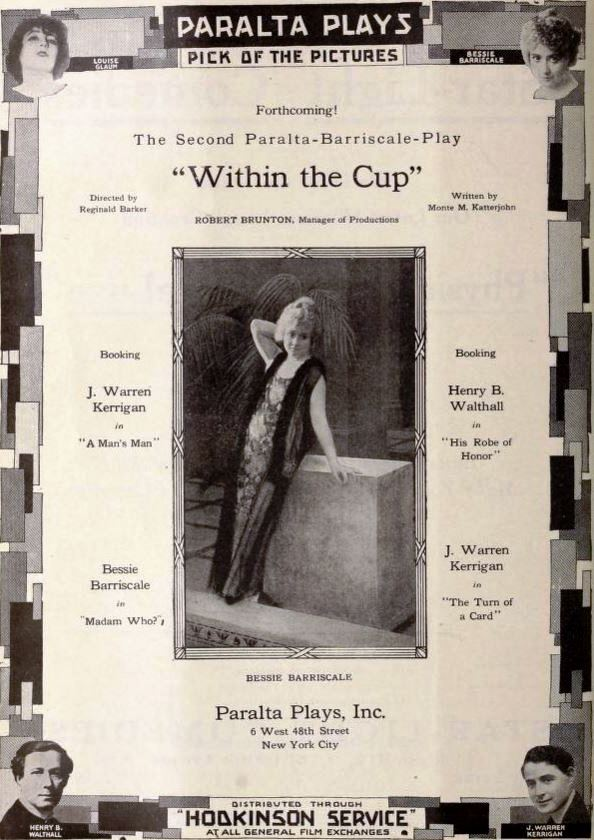
- Advertisement for Within the Cup from a 1918 issue of Exhibitors Herald
- Directed by: Raymond B. West
- Written by: Monte M. Katterjohn; Roy S. Sanford
- Produced by: Robert Brunton
- Starring: Bessie Barriscale; George Fisher; Edward Coxen
- Cinematography: Clyde De Vinna
- Production company: Paralta Plays
- Distributed by: Hodkinson Pictures
- Release date: March 1, 1918
- Running time: 70 minutes
- Country: United States
- Languages: Silent; English intertitles

Within the Cup is a 1918 American silent drama film directed by Raymond B. West and starring Bessie Barriscale, George Fisher and Edward Coxen.

== Cast ==
- Bessie Barriscale as Thisbe Lorraine
- George Fisher as Le Saint Hammond
- Edward Coxen as Ernst Faber
- Aggie Herring as Tea Cup Ann
- Margaret Livingston

== Preservation ==
With no prints of Within the Cup located in any film archives, it is considered a lost film.

== Bibliography ==
- Slide, Anthony. Aspects of American Film History Prior to 1920. Scarecrow Press, 1978.
