= Aggie Herring =

American actress (1876–1939)

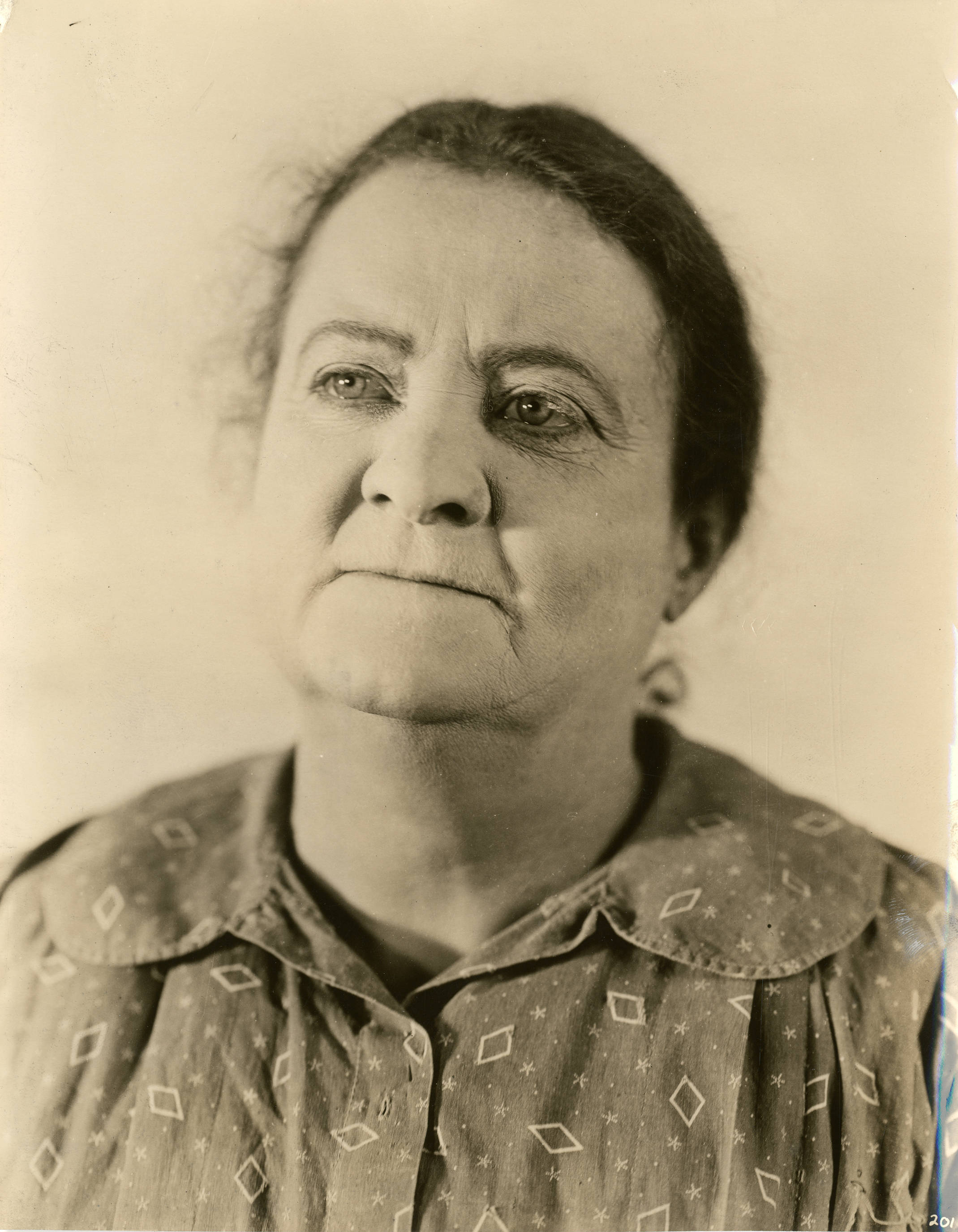
- Herring in 1923
- Born: Agnes Herring; February 4, 1876; San Francisco, California, U.S.
- Died: October 28, 1939 (aged 63); Santa Monica, California, U.S.
- Years active: 1915–1939

Agnes Herring (February 4, 1876 – October 28, 1939) was an American actress. She appeared in more than 100 films between 1915 and 1939.

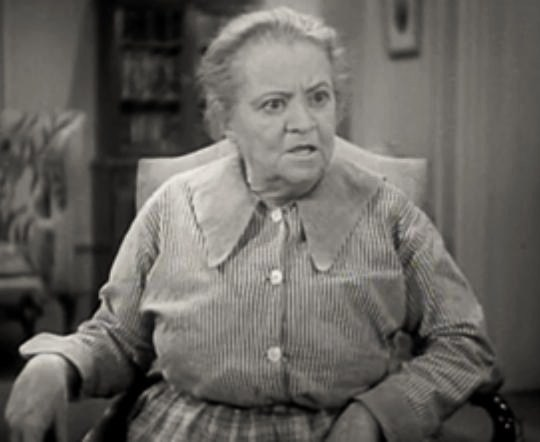
Herring in The Dark Hour, 1936

She was born in San Francisco and died in Santa Monica, California.

== Partial filmography ==
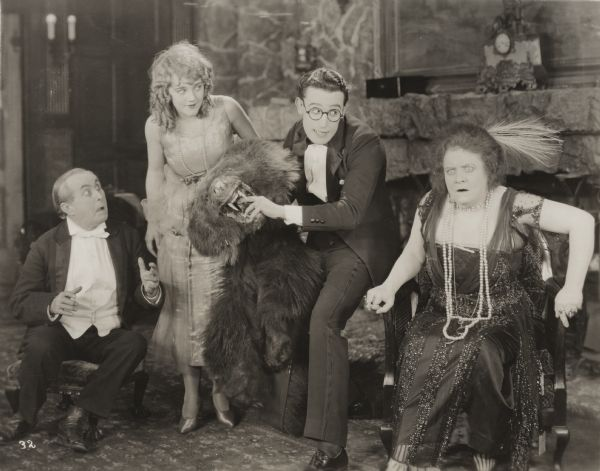
Still (right to left) of Herring with Harold Lloyd, Mildred Davis, and James T. Kelley in Among Those Present, 1921

- The Vagabond Prince (1916)
- The Crab (1917)
- Madcap Madge (1917)
- Wee Lady Betty (1917)
- The Snarl (1917)
- The Millionaire Vagrant (1917)
- Within the Cup (1918)
- More Trouble (1918)
- Cupid Forecloses (1919)
- A Yankee Princess (1919)
- A Man's Fight (1919)
- The Lord Loves the Irish (1919)
- The Hoodlum (1919)
- A Girl Named Mary (1919)
- Todd of the Times (1919)
- Daredevil Jack (1920)
- The Sagebrusher (1920)
- The Little Shepherd of Kingdom Come (1920)
- Hairpins (1920)
- Big Happiness (1920)
- The Dream Cheater (1920)
- The Dwelling Place of Light (1920)
- Among Those Present (1921)
- The Lure of Egypt (1921)
- The Mysterious Rider (1921)
- Queenie (1921)
- Oliver Twist (1922)
- A Blind Bargain (1922)
- Heart's Haven (1922)
- The Ragged Heiress (1922)
- The Isle of Lost Ships (1923)
- What a Wife Learned (1923)
- Let's Go (1923)
- The Brass Bottle (1923)
- The Age of Desire (1923)
- Pioneer Trails (1923)
- The Silent Watcher (1924)
- Wine of Youth (1924)
- Any Woman (1925)
- Pampered Youth (1925)
- Peacock Feathers (1925)
- Sally, Irene and Mary (1925)
- The Frontier Trail (1926)
- Watch Your Wife (1926)
- Kosher Kitty Kelly (1926)
- Sweet Daddies (1926)
- Twinkletoes (1926)
- Loco Luck (1927)
- McFadden's Flats (1927)
- Finnegan's Ball (1927)
- The Gorilla (1927)
- The Princess from Hoboken (1927)
- Mother Machree (1928)
- Lady Be Good (1928)
- Do Your Duty (1928)
- The Head of the Family (1928)
- Dark Streets (1929)
- Smiling Irish Eyes (1929)
- In the Next Room (1930)
- Clancy in Wall Street (1930)
- Kathleen Mavourneen (1930)
- Broadway Babies (1930)
- Meet the Wife (1931)
- Green Eyes (1934)
- The Quitter (1934)
- Stolen Sweets (1934)
- The Curtain Falls (1934)
- Suicide Squad (1935)
- The Man in Blue (1937)
