= Charles Arling =

Canadian actor (1875–1922)

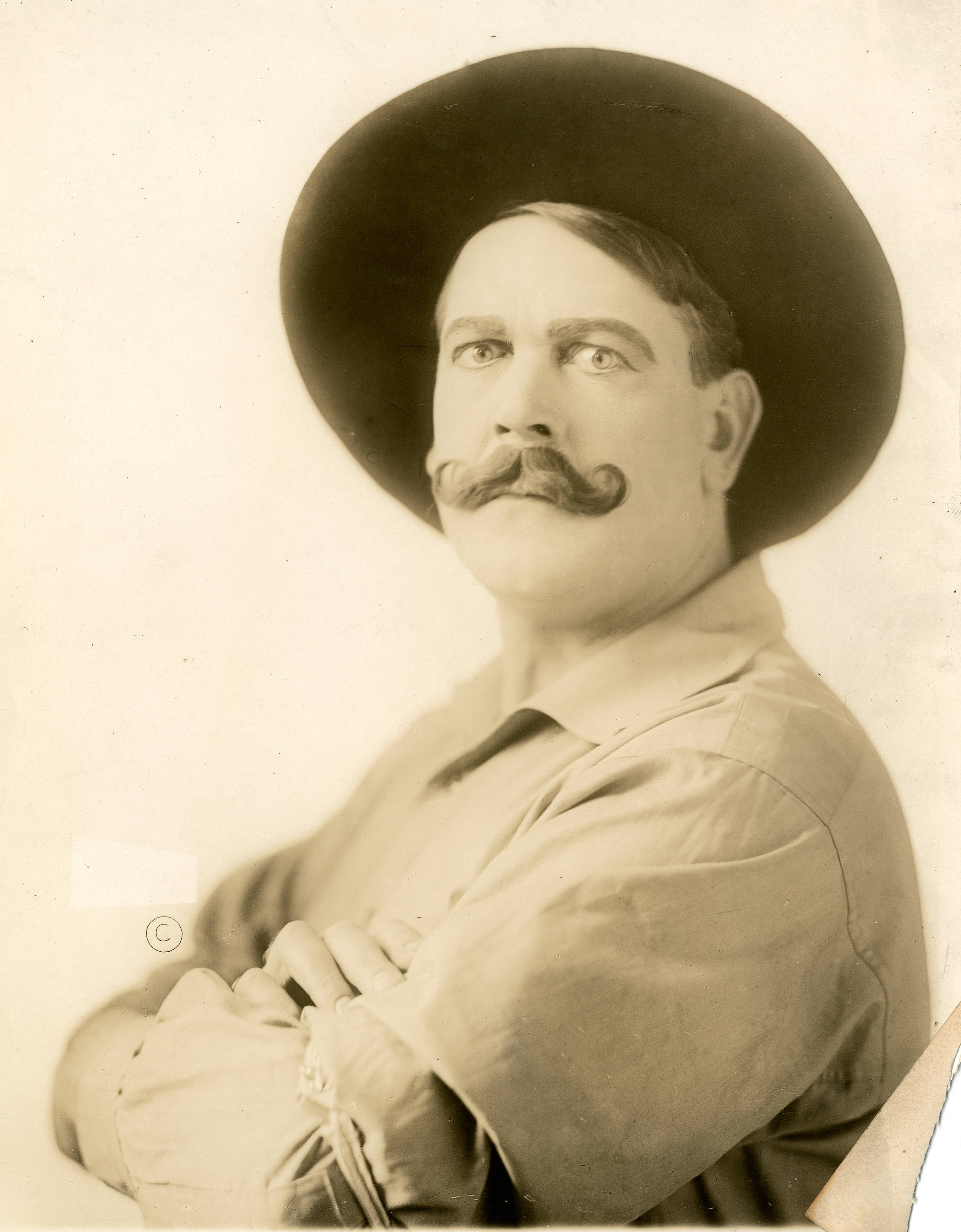
- Arling in 1919
- Born: Charles F. Parr; 22 August 1875; Toronto, Ontario, Canada
- Died: 21 April 1922 (aged 46); Los Angeles, California, US
- Years active: 1909–1922
- Spouse: Anna
- Children: 1

Charles Arling (22 August 1875 – 21 April 1922) was a Canadian actor of the silent era. He appeared in more than 100 films between 1909 and 1922. He was born in Toronto, Ontario, Canada and died on 21 April 1922 from pneumonia at the age of 46 in Los Angeles.

== Selected filmography ==
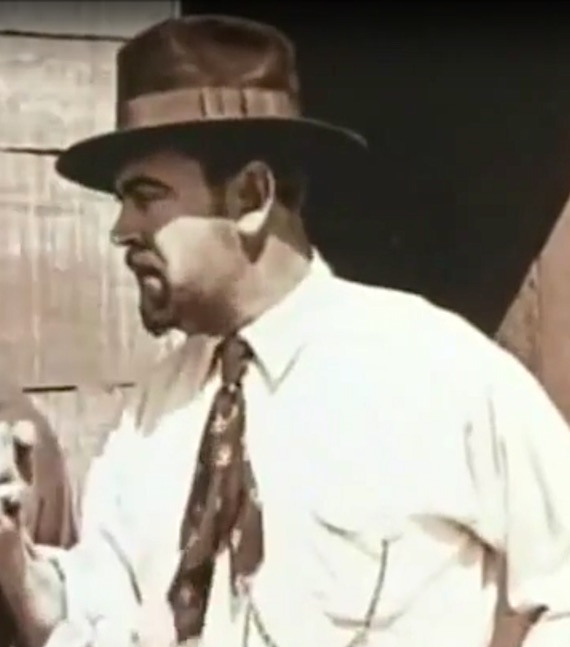
Arling as "Sealskin" Blake in the 1919 film Back to God's Country

- In Little Italy (1909)
- In the Border States (1910)
- A Mohawk's Way (1910)
- Sweet Memories (1911)
- September Morn (1914)
- That Little Band of Gold (1915)
- Court House Crooks (1915)
- Chased Into Love (1917)
- Nuts in May (1917)
- Mile-a-Minute Kendall (1918)
- The Border Wireless (1918)
- No Man's Land (1918)
- Smiles (1919)
- The Turn in the Road (1919)
- Back to God's Country (1919)
- In Old Kentucky (1919)
- The Woman in Room 13 (1920)
- The Jack-Knife Man (1920)
- The Desperate Hero (1920)
- Number 99 (1920)
- Blue Streak McCoy (1920)
- A Daughter of the Law (1921)
- Her Night of Nights (1922)
- When Romance Rides (1922)
- The Gray Dawn (1922)
- A Wonderful Wife (1922)

== See also ==
- Other Canadian pioneers in early Hollywood
