= The Westerners =

1919 film

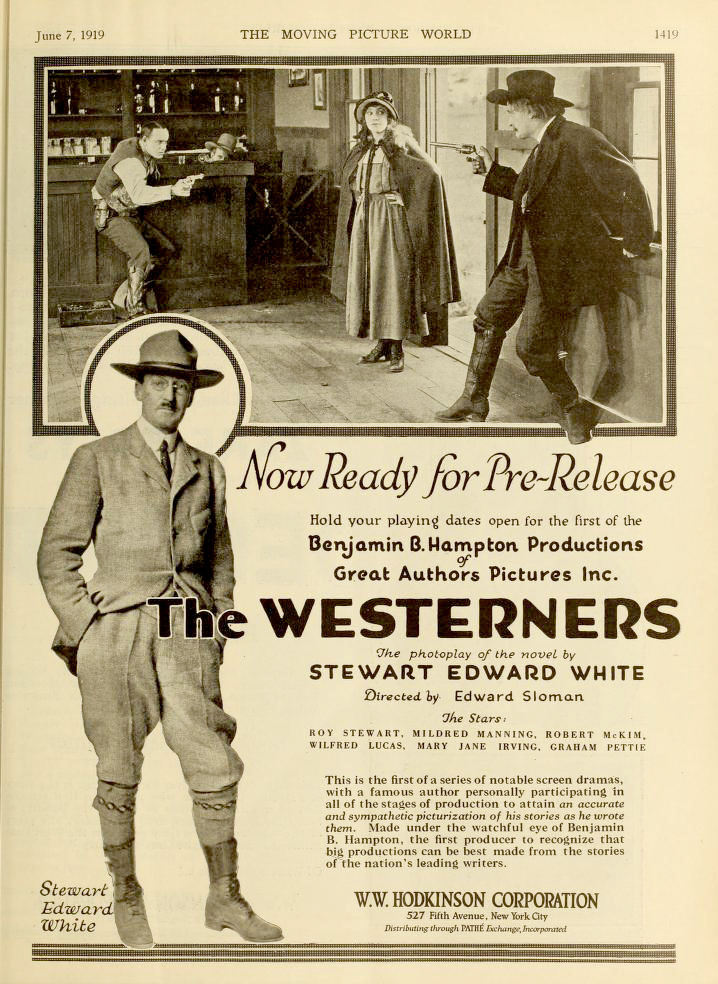
- Directed by: Edward Sloman
- Written by: Stewart Edward White(novel); Richard Schayer
- Produced by: Benjamin B. Hampton
- Starring: Roy Stewart; Robert McKim; Wilfred Lucas
- Cinematography: John F. Seitz
- Production companies: Great Authors Pictures; Benjamin B. Hampton Productions
- Distributed by: Hodkinson Pictures; Pathe Exchange
- Release date: August 3, 1919
- Running time: 70 minutes
- Country: United States
- Languages: Silent; English intertitles

The Westerners is a 1919 American silent Western film directed by Edward Sloman and starring Roy Stewart, Robert McKim and Wilfred Lucas.

== Cast ==
- Roy Stewart as Cheyenne Harry
- Robert McKim as Michael 'Black Mike' Lafond
- Wilfred Lucas as Jim Buckley
- Mildred Manning as Prue Welch / Molly Lafond
- Mary Jane Irving as Little Molly Welch
- Graham Pettie as Prof. Welch
- Frankie Lee as Dennis, the Kid
- Clark Comstock as Lone Wolf
- Dorothy Hagan as Bismarck Annie

== Bibliography ==
- Goble, Alan. The Complete Index to Literary Sources in Film. Walter de Gruyter, 1999.
