= A Corner in Cotton =

1916 film by Fred J. Balshofer

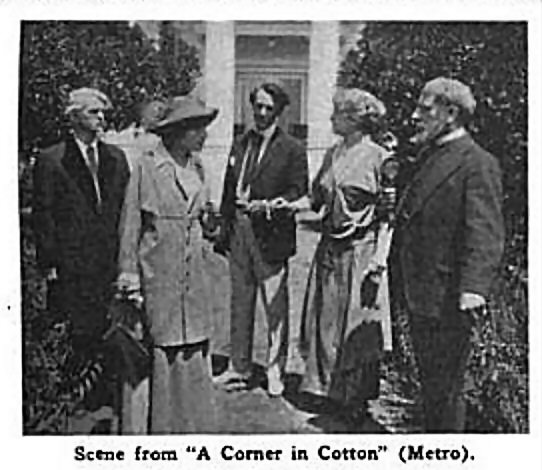
- Directed by: Fred J. Balshofer
- Screenplay by: Charles A. Taylor
- Story by: Anita Loos
- Starring: Marguerite Snow; William Clifford; Frank Bacon
- Production company: Quality Pictures
- Distributed by: Metro Pictures
- Release date: February 1916
- Running time: 5 reels
- Country: United States
- Language: Silent

A Corner in Cotton is a five-reel silent film melodrama produced in 1916 by Quality Pictures and distributed by Metro Pictures. The movie was filmed at studios in New York and California and on locations near Savannah, Georgia. A Corner in Cotton was directed by Fred J. Balshofer, with the assistance of Howard Truesdell and adapted for film by Charles A. Taylor from a story by Anita Loos. The film was released on February 21, 1916, with Marguerite Snow in the starring role.

== Plot ==
A Corner in Cotton tells the story of Peggy Ainslee, the daughter of a wealthy New York cotton broker, and John Carter, the son of a Southern cotton mill owner. Peggy grows weary of society life and decides to help improve the lot of the poor by becoming involved with the Settlement movement. She later travels south to investigate working conditions at Carter's cotton mill. Peggy manages to gain employment there, but soon attracts the unwanted advances of the mill foreman. John saves her from the would-be masher and the couple eventually fall in love. This becomes a problem with their fathers who had become business antagonist. In the end Peggy and John married after she foils her father's attempt to ruin Carter by cornering the market in cotton and then persuades the two men to settle their differences.

== Cast ==
- Marguerite Snow as Peggy Ainslee
- William Clifford as Richard Ainslee
- Frank Bacon as Col. Robert Carter
- Helen Dunbar as Mrs. Carter
- Wilfred Rogers as John Carter
- Zella Caull as Isabel Rawlston
- Howard Truesdale as Charles Hathaway
- Lester Cuneo as Willis Jackson
- John Goldsworthy as Algie Sherwood
