= Norma Lorimer =

Manx-born writer (1864–1948)

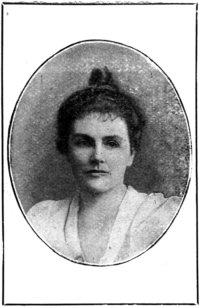
Norma Lorimer around 1899

Norma Octavia Lorimer (1864–1948) was a Scots novelist and travel writer, who has been called "One of the most notable early female novelists of the Isle of Man."

== Biography ==
Lorimer was born in Auchterarder, Perthshire, the eighth and youngest daughter in a family of eleven. Lorimer was raised at Ballasherlodge in Colby, Isle of Man, to which "she returned to in her fiction, showing clearly that she had 'lost her heart' to the South of the Island." She attended Castletown High School.

In the 1890s, Lorimer became secretary to Douglas Sladen, with whom she wrote book two of Queer Things about Sicily (Sicily from a Woman's Point of View). She contributed to the Girl's Own Paper and wrote numerous travel books and 26 "rather sentimental novels." "Perhaps her best book was On Etna," her novel A Wife out of Egypt became a best-seller. "The grand sweep of emotions in her Manx novels offers a fresh colouring to the history and scenery of the South of the Island whilst demonstrating the variance and colour to Manx novels."

Lorimer died on 14 February 1948, in Perth, Scotland.

== Adaptations ==
- The 1919 American silent film Woman, Woman! is based on Lorimer's 1915 novel On Desert Altars.
- The 1921 American film The Lure of Egypt is based on Lorimer's 1922 novel There was a King in Egypt.
- The 1924 British film Shadow of Egypt is based on Lorimer's 1923 novel The Shadow of Egypt.

== Publications ==
=== Travel books ===
- By the Waters of Sicily (1901)
- Sicily from a Woman's Point of View (1905)
- More Queer Things about Japan (1905) (with Douglas Sladen)
- By the Waters of Carthage (1906)
- By the Waters of Italy (1910)
- Queer Things about Sicily (1913) (with Douglas Sladen)
- By the Waters of Egypt (1913)
- By the Waters of Germany (1914)
- By the Waters of Africa (1917)
- The Mediterranean and Beyond (1921)

=== Novels ===
- A Sweet Disorder (1896)
- Josiah's Wife (1898)
- Mirry-Anne: A Manx Story (1900)
- On Etna (1904)
- The Second Woman. A Novel (1912)
- A Wife out of Egypt (1913)
- On Desert Altars (1915)
- The God's Carnival (1916)
- With Other Eyes (1919)
- Catherine Sterling (1920)
- A Mender of Images. A Novel (1921)
- The Path of Love (1921)
- There Was a King in Egypt (1922)
- The False Dawn (1923)
- White Sanctuary (1924)
- Alec's Mother: A Novel (1925)
- The Shadow of Egypt (1925)
- The Yoke of Affection (1926)
- The Pagan Woman (1927)
- The End of the Matter (1928)
- Moslem Jane (1929)
- Alone (1931)
- Millstones (1932)
- False Value (1933)
- The Story of Isobel Lennox (1935)
- Where Ignorance is Bliss (1938)
