= The Invisible Bond =

1919 film by Charles Maigne

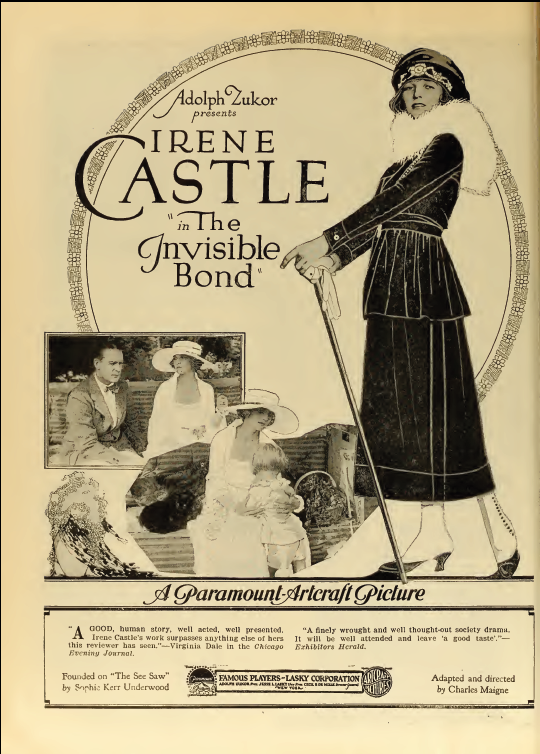
- Advertisement for film
- Directed by: Charles Maigne
- Screenplay by: Charles Maigne
- Based on: The See-Saw: A Story of To-day by Sophie Kerr
- Produced by: Adolph Zukor
- Starring: Irene Castle; Huntley Gordon; Claire Adams; Fleming Ward; George Majeroni; Helen Greene
- Cinematography: Faxon M. Dean
- Production company: Famous Players–Lasky Corporation
- Distributed by: Paramount Pictures
- Release date: November 23, 1919
- Running time: 50 minutes
- Country: United States
- Language: Silent (English intertitles)

The Invisible Bond is a lost 1919 American silent drama film directed by Charles Maigne and written by Charles Maigne based upon the novel The See-Saw: A Story of To-day by Sophie Kerr. The film stars Irene Castle, Huntley Gordon, Claire Adams, Fleming Ward, George Majeroni, and Helen Greene. The film was released on November 23, 1919, by Paramount Pictures.

== Cast ==
- Irene Castle as Marcia Crossey
- Huntley Gordon as Harleth Crossey
- Claire Adams as Leila Templeton
- Fleming Ward as Curtis Jennings
- George Majeroni as Wasson
- Helen Greene as Imogene
- Ida Waterman as Mrs. Crossey
- Warburton Gamble as Otis Vale
