= The Gray Dawn =

1922 silent film

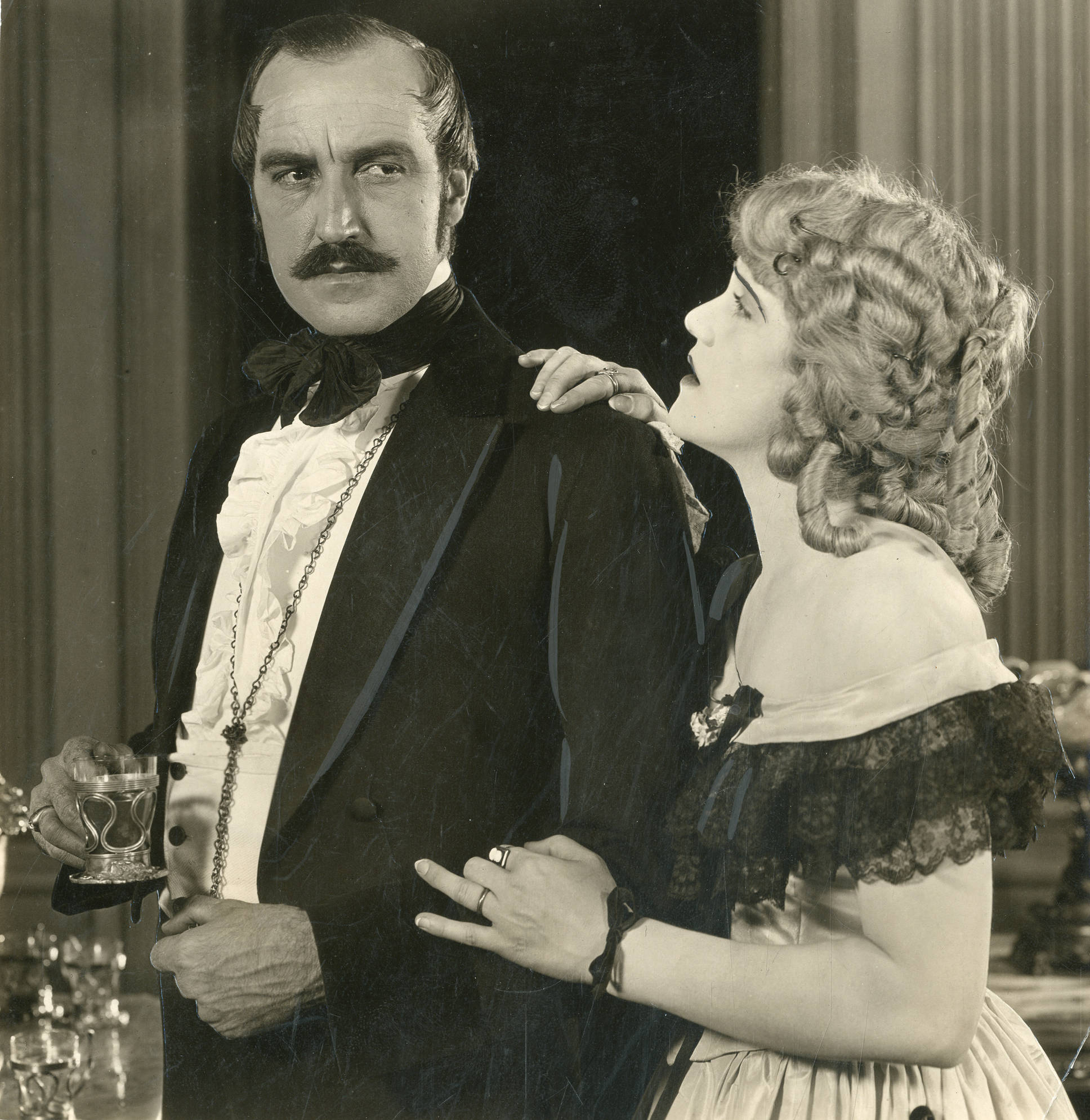
- Directed by: Jean Hersholt; Benjamin B. Hampton
- Written by: Marie Jenny Howe; Richard Schayer
- Based on: The Gray Dawn by Stewart Edward White
- Produced by: Benjamin B. Hampton
- Starring: Carl Gantvoort; Claire Adams; Robert McKim
- Cinematography: Friend Baker; Gus Peterson
- Production company: Benjamin B. Hampton Productions
- Distributed by: Hodkinson Pictures
- Release date: February 5, 1922
- Running time: 60 minutes
- Country: United States
- Languages: Silent; English intertitles

The Gray Dawn is a 1922 American silent drama film directed by Jean Hersholt, starring Carl Gantvoort, Claire Adams and Robert McKim. Some scenes were also likely directed by others, including producer Benjamin B. Hampton. It is based on the 1915 novel of the same title by Stewart Edward White.

== Plot ==
In San Francisco in the 1850s, the lawlessness of the western settlement is out of control. The District Attorney is under pressure from the corrupt mayor not to take action, leading to vigilante mobs.

== Cast ==
- Carl Gantvoort as Milton Keith
- Claire Adams as Nan Bennett
- Robert McKim as Ben Sansome
- George Hackathorne as Calhoun Bennett
- Snitz Edwards as Krafft
- Stanton Heck as Casey
- Omar Whitehead as Charles Cora
- Claire McDowell as Mrs. Bennett
- Maude Wayne as Mimi Morrell
- J. Gunnis Davis as Mr. Morrell
- Zack Williams as Sam
- Grace Marvin as Mammy
- Charles Arling as Ned Coleman
- Harvey Clark as King of Wiolliam
- Charles Thurston as Marshal Richardson
- Marc B. Robbins as Chinaman
- Charles Murphy as Bill Collector

== Bibliography ==
- Munden, Kenneth White. The American Film Institute Catalog of Motion Pictures Produced in the United States, Part 1. University of California Press, 1997.
