= No Man's Land (1918 film) =

1918 silent film directed by Will S. Davis

- Directed by: Will S. Davis
- Written by: Bert Lytell (scenario); Albert S. Le Vino (scenario); George D. Baker (titles)
- Based on: the novel, No Man's Land by Louis Joseph Vance
- Starring: Bert Lytell; Anna Q. Nilsson; Charles Arling
- Cinematography: Robert B. Kurrle
- Edited by: George D. Baker
- Production company: Metro Pictures
- Release date: July 8, 1918 (US)
- Running time: 5 reels
- Country: United States
- Language: English

No Man's Land is a 1918 American silent drama film, directed by Will S. Davis. It stars Bert Lytell, Anna Q. Nilsson, and Charles Arling, and was released on July 8, 1918.

== Cast list ==
- Bert Lytell as Garrett Cope
- Anna Q. Nilsson as Katherine Gresham
- Charles Arling as Henry Miller, otherwise Heinrich Mueller
- Mollie McConnell as Emily Brayton
- Eugene Pallette as Sidney Dundas
- Edward Alexander as Pembroke Van Tuyl
- Sydney Deane
