= The Dwelling Place of Light (film) =

1920 film by Jack Conway

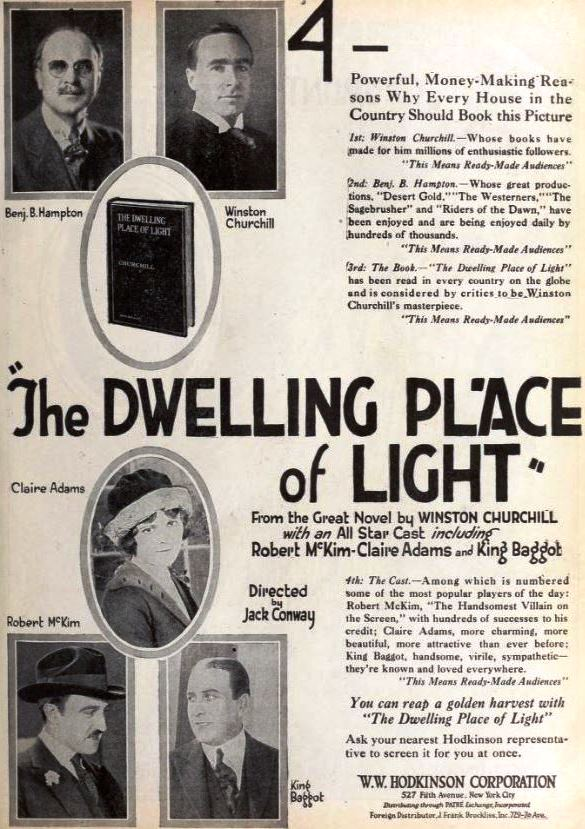
- Directed by: Jack Conway
- Written by: Winston Churchill (novel); William Clifford
- Produced by: Benjamin B. Hampton
- Starring: Claire Adams; Nigel De Brulier; King Baggot
- Cinematography: Enrique Juan Vallejo
- Production company: Benjamin B. Hampton Productions
- Distributed by: Pathé Exchange; W. W. Hodkinson Corporation
- Release date: September 12, 1920
- Running time: 7 reels
- Country: United States
- Languages: Silent; English intertitles

The Dwelling Place of Light is a 1920 American silent drama film directed by Jack Conway and starring Claire Adams, Nigel De Brulier and King Baggot. It is based on the 1917 novel The Dwelling-Place of Light by the American novelist Winston Churchill.

== Cast ==
- Claire Adams as Janet Butler
- Nigel De Brulier as James Rolfe
- King Baggot as Brooks Insall
- Robert McKim as Claude Ditmar
- Ogden Crane as Chester Sprole
- Lassie Young as Elsie Butler
- Lydia Knott as Hannah Butler
- George Berrell as Edward Butler
- Beulah Booker as Julia Gallagher
- William V. Mong as John Gallager
- Aggie Herring as Mrs. Gallagher
- Charles Murphy as Guido Antonelli

== Preservation ==
With no holdings located in archives, The Dwelling Place of Light is considered a lost film.

== Bibliography ==
- James Robert Parish & Michael R. Pitts. Film directors: a guide to their American films. Scarecrow Press, 1974.
