= Robert McKim (actor) =

American actor (1877–1927)

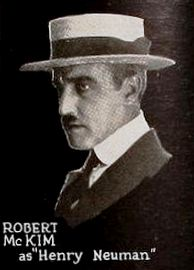
- Ad for Riders of the Dawn (1920)
- Born: 1877; San Jacinto, California, U.S.
- Died: June 4, 1927 (aged 49); Hollywood, California, U.S.
- Occupation: Actor
- Years active: 1915-1927
- Spouse: Dorcas Matthews (m. 1920)
- Children: 2

Robert McKim (1877 – June 4, 1927) was an American actor of the silent film era and a performer in vaudeville. He appeared in nearly 100 films between 1915 and 1927. He played the arch villain opposite Douglas Fairbanks's Zorro in The Mark of Zorro in 1920.

== Biography ==
McKim was born in 1877 in San Jacinto, California and attended schools in San Francisco. He acted with stock theater companies in California, beginning with the Alcazar Stock Company, before he worked in films, beginning with the Ince and Triangle companies.

McKim starred with Lon Chaney in the 1923 silent version of All The Brothers Were Valiant. One of his last roles was again as a villain in the unfinished silent The Mysterious Island, starring Lionel Barrymore based on the Jules Verne novel. Though McKim shot its silent sequences in 1927, the film was not released until 1929 and McKim was uncredited.

A nervous breakdown caused McKim to leave films. He went on to perform in vaudeville.

McKim married fellow actress Dorcas Matthews and they had two sons.

He died on June 4, 1927, in Los Angeles, California, hospital, aged 50. His death came three days after he had "a partial stroke of paralysis".

== Selected filmography ==
- The Edge of the Abyss (1915)
- Hell's Hinges (1916)
- The Stepping Stone (1916)
- The Return of Draw Egan (1916)
- The Devil's Double (1916)
- The Raiders (1916)
- The Weaker Sex (1917)
- The Iced Bullet (1917)
- Paws of the Bear (1917)
- The Dark Road (1917)
- Time Locks and Diamonds (1917)
- The Last of the Ingrams (1917)
- Paddy O'Hara (1917)
- 'Blue Blazes' Rawden (1918)
- The Marriage Ring (1918)
- When Do We Eat? (1918)
- Fuss and Feathers (1918)
- Partners Three (1919)
- Wagon Tracks (1919)
- Her Kingdom of Dreams (1919)
- The Westerners (1919)
- The Devil to Pay (1920)
- The U.P. Trail (1920)
- The Money Changers (1920)
- Riders of the Dawn (1920)
- The Woman in Room 13 (1920)
- The Dwelling Place of Light (1920)
- Bullet Proof (1920)
- The Mark of Zorro (1920)
- The Spenders (1921)
- The Mysterious Rider (1921)
- The Lure of Egypt (1921)
- The Man of the Forest (1921)
- A Certain Rich Man (1921)
- The Gray Dawn (1922)
- Monte Cristo (1922)
- Heart's Haven (1922)
- All the Brothers Were Valiant (1923)
- Dead Game (1923)
- Thundergate (1923)
- Human Wreckage (1923)
- The Spider and the Rose (1923)
- His Last Race (1923)
- The Spoilers (1923)
- Hollywood (1923) (cameo)
- The Spoilers (1923)
- Strangers of the Night (1923)
- Maytime (1923)
- Ride for Your Life (1924)
- Mademoiselle Midnight (1924)
- When a Girl Loves (1924)
- The Torrent (1924)
- Spook Ranch (1925)
- The Police Patrol (1925)
- The Bat (1926)
- The Tough Guy (1926)
- The Dead Line (1926)
- The Strong Man (1926)
- The Wolf Hunters (1926)
- A Regular Scout (1926)
- Kentucky Handicap (1926)
- The Denver Dude (1927)
- The Thrill Seekers (1927)
- The Show Girl (1927)
- The Mysterious Island (1929)
