= Shadow of Egypt =

1924 film

- Alma Taylor and Milton Rosmer
- Directed by: Sidney Morgan
- Written by: Sidney Morgan
- Based on: Shadow of Egpyt by Norma Lorimer
- Starring: Carlyle Blackwell; Alma Taylor; Milton Rosmer; Joan Morgan
- Production company: Astra-National
- Distributed by: Astra-National
- Release date: November 1924
- Country: United Kingdom
- Languages: Silent; English intertitles

Shadow of Egypt is a 1924 British silent adventure film directed by Sidney Morgan and starring Carlyle Blackwell, Alma Taylor and Milton Rosmer. The film was shot on location around Cairo in Egypt. The director's daughter Joan Morgan appears in a supporting role. The Shadow of Egypt is based on Norma Lorimer's 1923 novel of the same name.

== Synopsis ==
A European adventurer tries to steal from an ancient Egyptian tomb, only to become afflicted by a mysterious curse.

== Cast ==
- Carlyle Blackwell as Sheik Hanan
- Alma Taylor as Lilian Westcott
- Milton Rosmer as Harold Westcott
- Joan Morgan as Princess Moonface
- Arthur Walcott as Abdallah
- Charles Levey as Yusef
- John F. Hamilton as Apollo
