= The Wheel (1925 film) =

1925 film by Victor Schertzinger

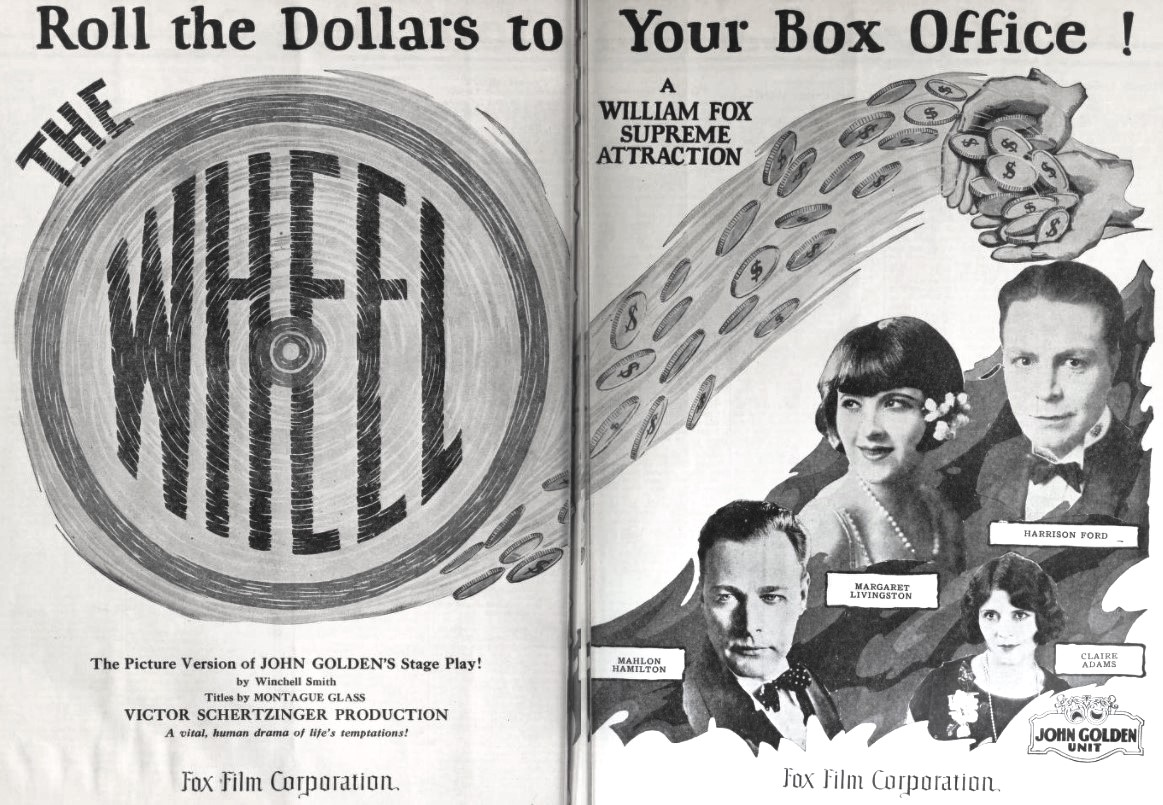
- Advertisement
- Directed by: Victor Schertzinger
- Written by: Edfrid A. Bingham
- Based on: The Wheel by Winchell Smith
- Produced by: William Fox
- Starring: Margaret Livingston; Harrison Ford; Claire Adams
- Cinematography: Glen MacWilliams
- Production company: Fox Film
- Distributed by: Fox Film
- Release date: September 20, 1925
- Running time: 80 minutes
- Country: United States
- Language: Silent (English intertitles)

The Wheel is a 1925 American silent drama film directed by Victor Schertzinger and starring Margaret Livingston, Harrison Ford, and Claire Adams.

== Plot ==
As described in a film magazine reviews, Ted Morton's habit of gambling worries his parents, who make him promise to quit. When he announces that he is going to marry a milliner, his father objects to this also, and Ted leaves home. He and Kate are married. Edward Baker, a gambling house owner, had also wanted Kate, so decides to break Ted to revenge himself. He buys a costly car from Ted, who is now a salesman. When Ted appears to collect the money owned on the car for his company, Baker induces him to gamble with it. Ted loses, and confesses the loss to Kate, who in her turn confesses to losing money on a horse race. Baker, remorseful, gives Ted a check for the amount he had lost. Kate and Ted swear off gambling.

== Cast ==
- Margaret Livingston as Elsie Dixon
- Harrison Ford as Ted Morton
- Claire Adams as Kate O'Hara
- Mahlon Hamilton as Edward Baker
- David Torrence as Theodore Morton Sr.
- Julia Swayne Gordon as Mrs. Morton
- Clara Horton as Nora Malone
- George Harris as Sammy
- Erin La Bissoniere as Rhea Weinstein
- Russ Powell as Dan Satterly
- Hazel Howell as Clara

== Preservation ==
With no prints of The Wheel located in any film archives, it is a lost film.

== Bibliography ==
- Solomon, Aubrey. The Fox Film Corporation, 1915-1935: A History and Filmography. McFarland, 2011. ISBN 978-0-7864-6286-5
