= Heart's Haven =

1922 silent film

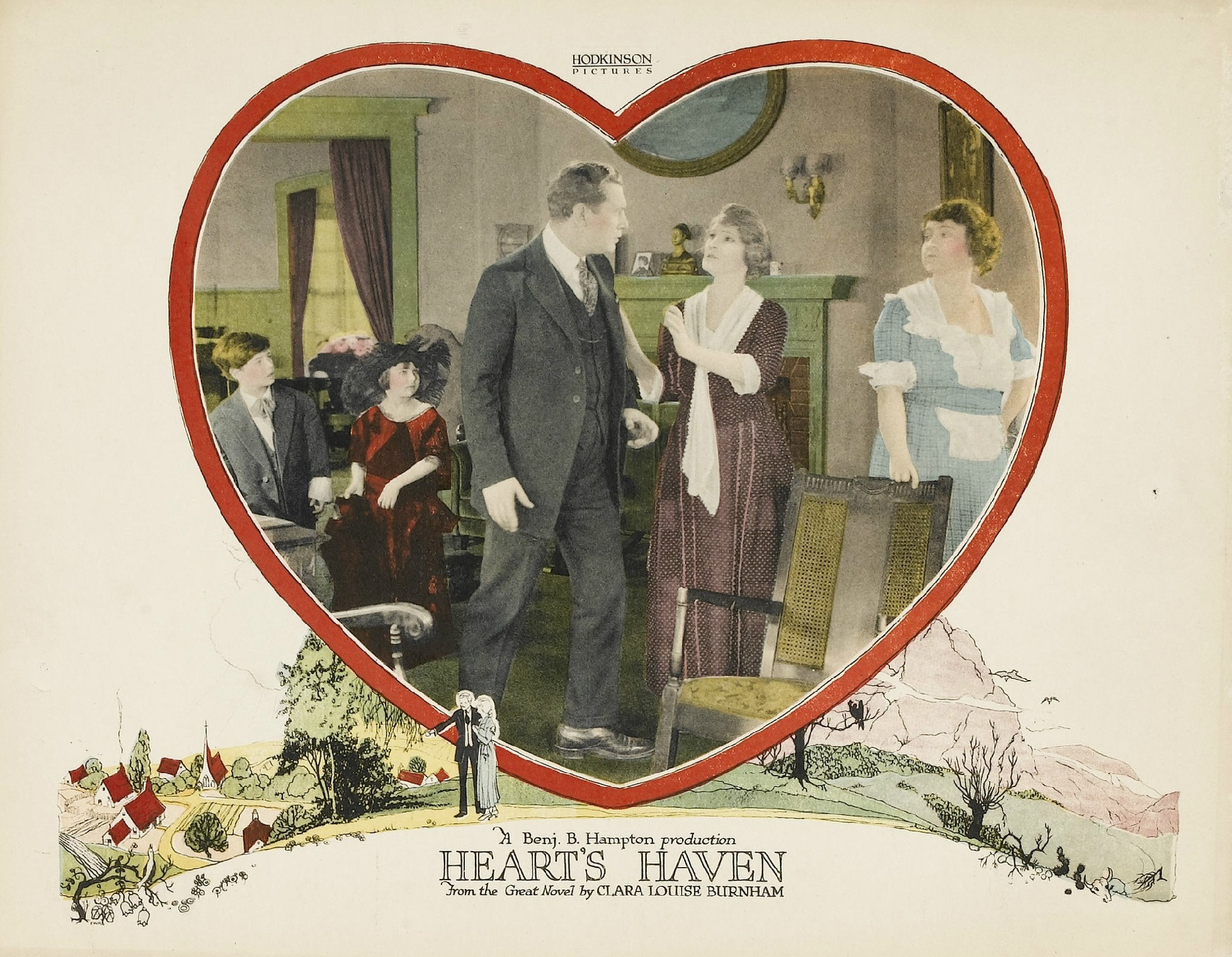
- Directed by: Benjamin B. Hampton
- Written by: Clara Louise Burnham (novel); Benjamin B. Hampton
- Produced by: Benjamin B. Hampton
- Starring: Robert McKim; Claire Adams; Carl Gantvoort
- Cinematography: Friend Baker; Gus Peterson
- Production company: Benjamin B. Hampton Productions
- Distributed by: Hodkinson Pictures
- Release date: August 1922
- Running time: 62 minutes
- Country: United States
- Languages: Silent; English intertitles

Heart's Haven is a 1922 American silent drama film directed by Benjamin B. Hampton and starring Robert McKim, Claire Adams and Carl Gantvoort.

== Cast ==
- Robert McKim as Adam Breed
- Claire Adams as Vivian Breed
- Carl Gantvoort as Joe Laird
- Claire McDowell as May Caroline
- Betty Brice as Gladys Laird
- Frankie Lee as Bobbie Laird
- Mary Jane Irving as Ella Laird
- Harry Lorraine as Dr. Burchard
- Jean Hersholt as Henry Bird
- Frank Hayes as Pynch
- Aggie Herring as Mrs. Harohan

== Bibliography ==
- Munden, Kenneth White. The American Film Institute Catalog of Motion Pictures Produced in the United States, Part 1. University of California Press, 1997.
