= When Romance Rides =

1922 film directed by Jean Hersholt

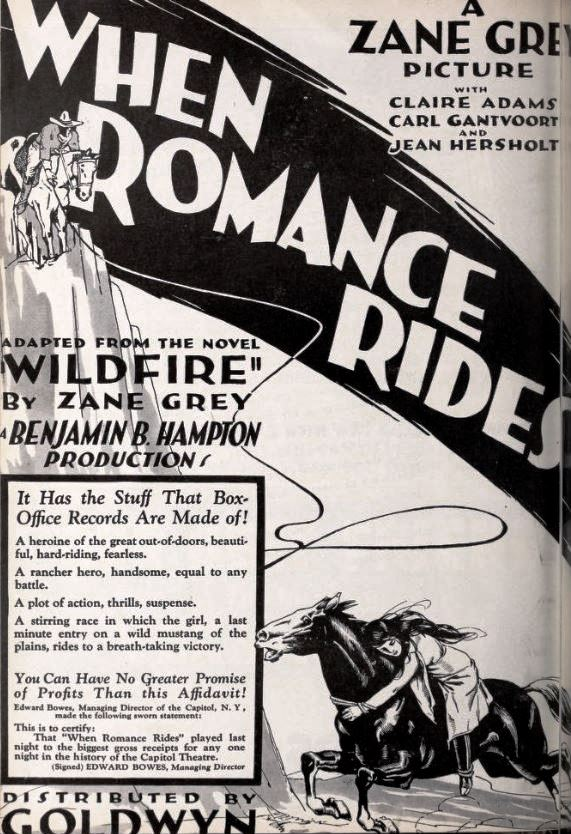
- Advertisement
- Directed by: Eliot Howe; Charles O. Rush; Jean Hersholt
- Screenplay by: Benjamin B. Hampton
- Based on: Wildfire by Zane Grey
- Produced by: Benjamin B. Hampton
- Starring: Claire Adams; Carl Gantvoort; Jean Hersholt; Harry von Meter
- Cinematography: Gus Peterson; William M. Edmond
- Production company: Goldwyn Pictures
- Distributed by: Goldwyn Pictures
- Release date: April 9, 1922
- Running time: 50 minutes
- Country: United States
- Language: Silent (English intertitles)

When Romance Rides is a 1922 American drama film directed by Eliot Howe, Charles O. Rush, and Jean Hersholt and written by Benjamin B. Hampton. It is based on the 1917 novel Wildfire by Zane Grey. The film stars Claire Adams, Carl Gantvoort, Jean Hersholt, Harry von Meter, Charles Arling, and Mary Jane Irving. The film was released on April 9, 1922, by Goldwyn Pictures.

== Plot ==
As described in a film magazine, Lucy Bostil and her father have staked everything on their horse winning a race. Bill Cordts and his henchman Joel Creech try to kill all the favorite horses so that theirs will win. Joel is fired and swears revenge.

Shortly before the race is to take place Lucy finds Lin Slone who has been somewhat hurt in an encounter with a wild horse he calls Wildfire. She takes him to the ranch. Lin and the young woman are mutually attracted. Bill and Joel steal one of the Bostil horses and dope the other. Lucy and Lin substitute Wildfire for the race, with Lucy riding him as the horse only allows Lin or Lucy to mount him. Lucy rides Wildfire to victory in an exciting race. Bill had entered the Bostil horse in the race against Wildfire, having had the horse's face painted to prevent anyone from recognizing him, but the paint is accidentally rubbed and the deceit discovered.

Joel, half-witted, makes a dummy so as to impersonate Lucy so that he imagine that he is taking revenge upon her by abusing it. Bill suggests that he get the real Lucy. Joel kidnaps Lucy and takes her to Bill's ranch. Bill, in the meantime, attempts to get back into the good graces of the Bostil's by sending them a note stating that he has rescued Lucy from Joel. Lin knows that she is in danger and rides to her rescue. Bill and Lin fight and Bill is killed. Joel ties Lucy to her horse and directs it towards a cliff while Lin races to the rescue. Joel is caught in a loop of his rope and is dragged to his death. Lin saves Lucy at the cliff's edge.

== Cast ==
- Claire Adams as Lucy Bostil
- Carl Gantvoort as Lin Slone
- Jean Hersholt as Joel Creech
- Harry von Meter as Bill Cordts
- Charles Arling as Bostil
- Mary Jane Irving as 'Bostie' Bostil
- Tod Sloan as Holley
- Audrey Chapman as Lucy's Chum
- Frank Hayes as Dr. Binks
- Helen Howard as Lucy's Chum
- S.J. Bingham as Dick Sears
- Walter Perkins as Thomas Brackton
- Babe London as Sally Brackton
- John Beck as Van
