= Your Obedient Servant (film) =

1917 silent film

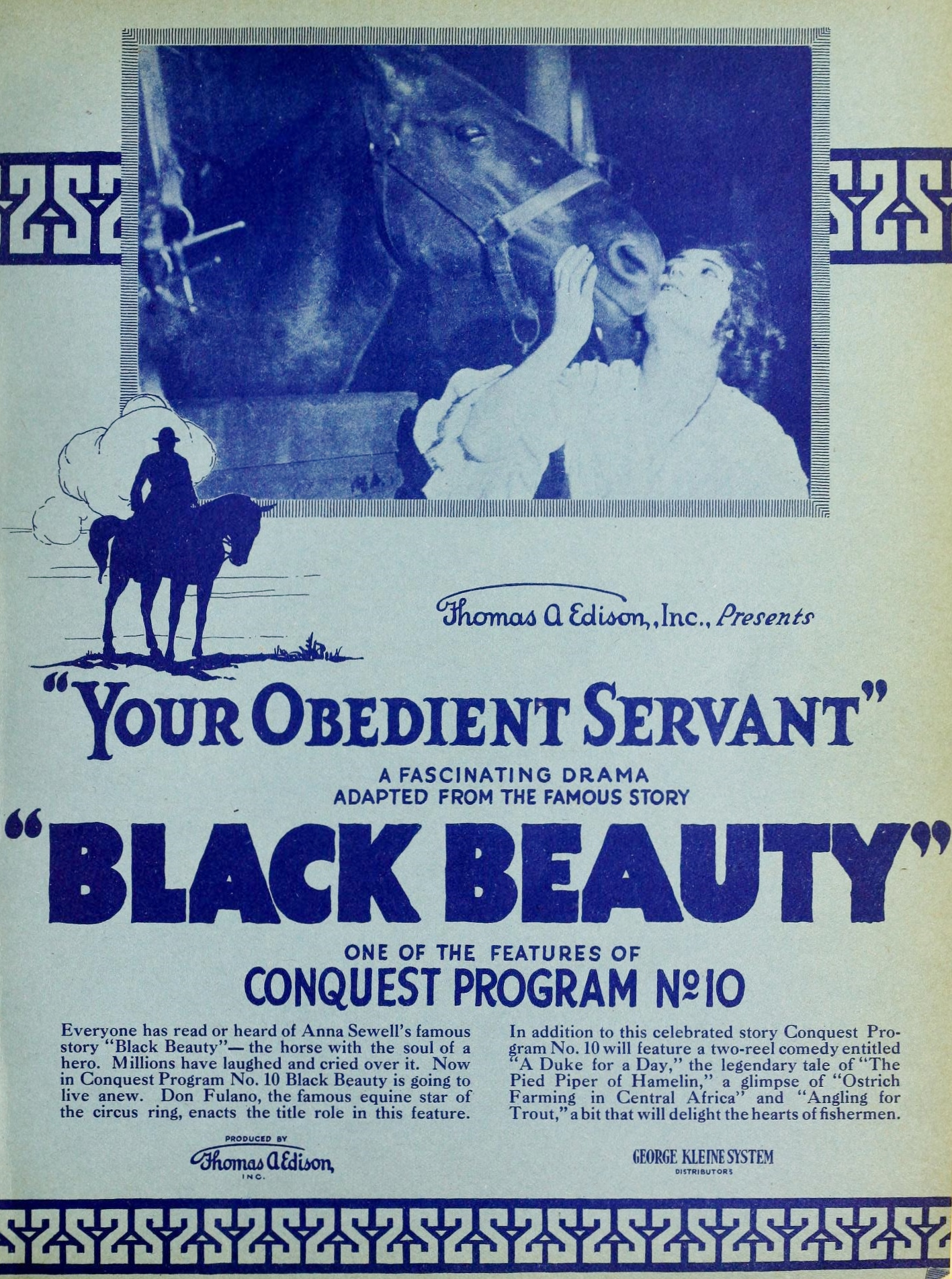
- Directed by: Edward H. Griffith
- Written by: Anna Sewell (novel)
- Starring: Claire Adams; Pat O'Malley; Helen Pillsbury
- Production company: Edison Studios
- Distributed by: K-E-S-E Service
- Release date: September 15, 1917
- Running time: 50 minutes
- Country: United States
- Languages: Silent; English intertitles

Your Obedient Servant is a 1917 American silent drama film directed by Edward H. Griffith and starring Claire Adams, Pat O'Malley and Helen Pillsbury.

== Cast ==
- Claire Adams
- Pat O'Malley
- Helen Pillsbury as
- Charles R. Moore
- Don Fulano as Black Beauty

== See also ==
- List of films and television shows about the American Civil War

== Bibliography ==
- Robert B. Connelly. The Silents: Silent Feature Films, 1910-36, Volume 40, Issue 2. December Press, 1998.
