= William Clifford (actor) =

American actor (1878–1941)

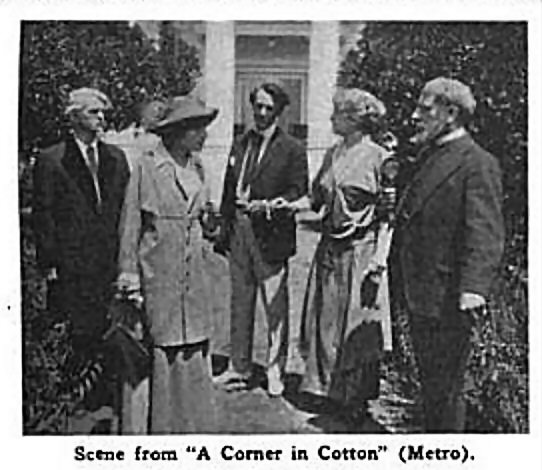
- Still showing Clifford (right) in A Corner in Cotton (1916)
- Born: 1878; New Orleans, Louisiana, U.S.
- Died: December 23, 1941 (aged 64); Los Angeles, California, U.S.
- Occupations: Actor, screenwriter
- Years active: 1910-1929

William Clifford (1878 – December 23, 1941) was an American actor and screenwriter of the silent era. He appeared in 170 films between 1910 and 1929. He also wrote for 30 films between 1913 and 1919.

Clifford was born in New Orleans in 1878, and he was educated in voice and music in Toronto, Canada.

Early in his career, Clifford acted on stage as a supporting player for 18 years before he formed his own repertory company that toured the United States. He also was the leading man in Earnest Shipman's Prisoner of Zenda company.

He died in Los Angeles, California.

== Selected filmography ==
- The Immortal Alamo (1911)
- When Lincoln Paid (1913 - wrote)
- The Werewolf (1913)
- The Battle of Bull Run (1913)
- Threads of Destiny (1914)
- The Second in Command (1915)
- The Silent Voice (1915)
- Nearly a King (1916) (screenplay)
- A Corner in Cotton (1916)
- My Lady Incog (1916), wrote
- The Island of Desire (1917)
- A Tale of Two Cities (1917)
- Pay Me! (1917)
- The Avenging Trail (1917)
- The Square Deceiver (1917)
- Broadway Bill (1918)
- The Landloper (1918)
- Gambling in Souls (1919)
- The U.P. Trail (1920)
- The Confession (1920)
- Riders of the Dawn (1920)
- The Sagebrusher (1920)
- The Notorious Miss Lisle (1920)
- The Dwelling Place of Light (1920)
- The Money Changers (1920)
- The Turning Point (1920)
- The Man of the Forest (1921)
- Sowing the Wind (1921)
- The Mask (1921)
- The Isle of Love (1922)
- Ashes of Vengeance (1923)
- Stepping Lively (1924)
- See You in Jail (1927)
