= The Lure of Egypt =

1921 film directed by Howard Hickman

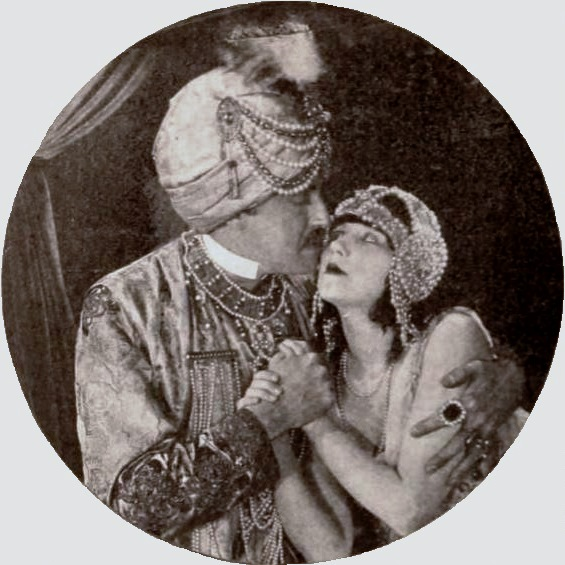
- Directed by: Howard C. Hickman
- Written by: Norma Lorimer (novel); Richard Schayer; Elliott J. Clawson
- Starring: Robert McKim; Claire Adams; Joseph J. Dowling
- Cinematography: Enrique Juan Vallejo
- Production company: Federal Photoplays of California
- Distributed by: Pathé Exchange
- Release date: May 15, 1921
- Country: United States
- Languages: Silent; English intertitles

The Lure of Egypt is a 1921 American silent drama film directed by Howard C. Hickman and starring Robert McKim, Claire Adams and Joseph J. Dowling. The film is an adaptation of the novel ‘’There was a King in Egypt’’, by Norma Lorimer.

== Cast ==
- Robert McKim as Prince Dagmar
- Claire Adams as Margaret Lampton
- Joseph J. Dowling as Professor Lampton
- Carl Gantvoort as Michael Amory
- Maude Wayne as Millient Mervill
- William Lion West as Nishi
- Frank Hayes as Abdul
- Zack Williams as Theodore
- Aggie Herring as Mrs. Botts
- George Hernandez as Mr. Botts
- Harry Lorraine as Gondo Koro

== Bibliography ==
- Munden, Kenneth White. The American Film Institute Catalog of Motion Pictures Produced in the United States, Part 1. University of California Press, 1997.
