= Claire Adams =

Canadian actress

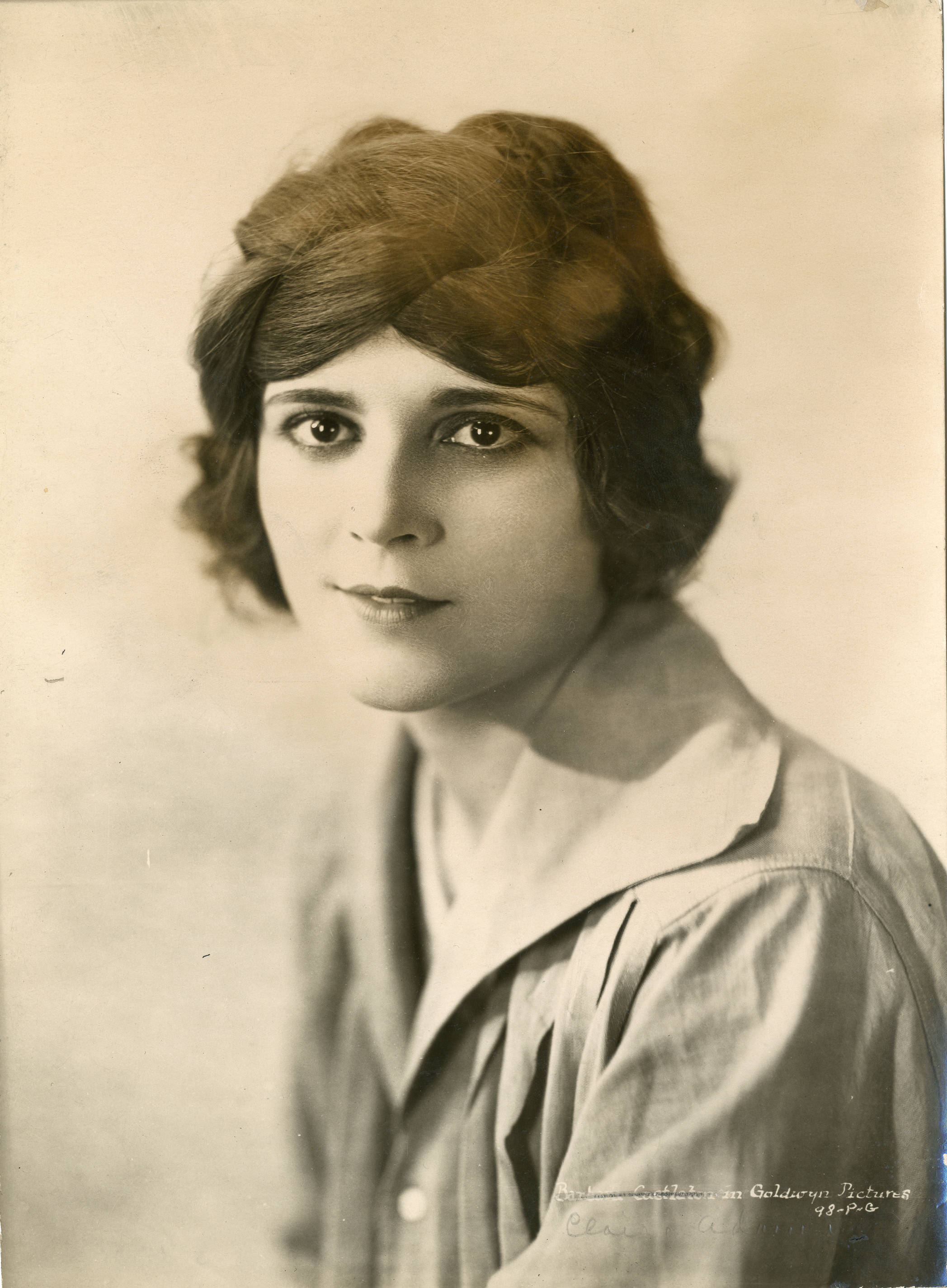
- Adams in 1920
- Born: Beryl Vere Nassau Adams; 24 September 1898; Winnipeg, Manitoba, Canada
- Died: 25 September 1978 (aged 80); Melbourne, Australia
- Years active: 1912–1963
- Spouses: Benjamin B. Hampton (m. 1924; died 1932); Donald John Scobie Mackinnon (m. 1932; died 1974)

Claire Adams (née Beryl Vere Nassau Adams; 24 September 1898 – 25 September 1978) was a silent film actress and benefactor. She was born in Canada, studied there and in England, and developed a movie career in Hollywood. She spent the second half of her life in Australia.

== Early years ==
Born in Winnipeg, Adams was the daughter of operatic teacher and singer Stanley Adams and Lillian Adams. She had a sister and a brother. She moved with her family to London, England, when she was seven years old. At age 13 she visited Canada and ended up staying with relatives there. At some point her parents moved to Toronto, and she rejoined them there. Her education included St. Hilda's Academy in Calgary, Canada, followed by a finishing school in England.

== Career ==
While Adams worked as a nurse in a Detroit hospital, the United States entered World War I. The Army had her portray a nurse in films that were shown in military camps. Her flim debut came in The Spirit of the Red Cross (1919). She went on to become a star for B. B. Hampton productions and later made films for Goldwyn. Early in Adams's career her performances lacked emotion. Even with experience she reached only a level that one newspaper article described as "giving interesting, delightful, but emotionally lukewarm performances". That situation changed with her work in The Big Parade, which the same article called "the first truly emotional performance in Claire's career". Her progress continued when she portrayed Maud Brewster in The Sea Wolf, leading to compliments for her performance in an "intensely emotional role".

== Personal life and death ==
Adams married the film producer Ben Hampton in Los Angeles in 1924, who died in 1932, leaving her very wealthy, and the Australian pastoralist Donald John Scobie MacKinnon in 1937 until his death in 1974.. She died on 25 September 1978, in Windsor, Victoria, aged 80, and was cremated.

== Filmography ==
Year	Title	Role	Notes
1934	What a Mother-in-Law!	Frances	
1927	Combat	Wanda	
1927	Married Alive	Viola Helmesley Duxbury	
1927	The Lunatic		
1926	The Sea Wolf	Maud Brewster	
1926	Combat	Wanda	
1926	Yellow Fingers	Nona Deering	
1925	The Big Parade	Justyn Reed	
1925	The Wheel	Kate O'Hara	
1925	Souls for Sables	Helen Ralston	Uncredited
1925	The Kiss Barrier	Marion Weston	
1925	Men and Women	Agnes Prescott	
1925	The Devil's Cargo	Martha Joyce	
1924	The Brass Bowl	Sylvia	
1924	The Fast Set	Fay Colleen	
1924	The Painted Flapper	Eunice Whitney	
1924	Helen's Babies	Helen Lawrence	
1924	Oh, You Tony!	Betty Faine	
1924	Honor Among Men	Patricia Carson	
1924	The Girl in the Limousine	The Girl	
1924	Missing Daughters	Claire Mathers	
1924	The Night Hawk	Clia Milton	
1924	Daddies	Bobette Audrey	
1923	The Clean Up	Phyllis Andrews	
1923	Legally Dead	Minnie O'Reilly	
1923	Where the North Begins	Felice McTavish	
1923	Stepping Fast	Helen Durant	
1923	Brass Commandments	Ellen Bosworth	
1923	The Scarlet Car	Beatrice Forbes	
1922	Do and Dare	Juanita Sánchez	
1922	Heart's Haven	Vivian Breed	
1922	Just Tony	Marianne Jordan	
1922	Golden Dreams	Mercedes McDonald	
1922	When Romance Rides	Lucy Bostil	
1922	The Gray Dawn	Nan Bennett	
1921	The Mysterious Rider	Columbine	
1921	The Man of the Forest	Helen Raynor	
1921	A Certain Rich Man	Molly Culpepper	
1921	The Lure of Egypt	Margaret Lampton	
1921	Black Beauty		Claire Adams is not in the Vitagraph film. She appeared in a competing rival version of the story produced by Eskay Harris Feature Film Company.
1921	The Killer	Ruth Emory	
1921	The Spenders	Avice Milbrey	
1920	The Dwelling Place of Light	Janet Butler	
1920	The Penalty	Barbara	
1920	Riders of the Dawn	Lenore Anderson	
1920	The White Dove	Ella De Fries	Credited as Clare Adams
1920	The Key to Power	Ann Blair	
1920	The Money Changers	Lucy Hegan	
1920	The Great Lover	Ethel	
1919	The Invisible Bond	Leila Templeton	Also known as Should a Wife Forgive? (USA)
1919	A Misfit Earl	Phyllis Burton	
1919	Speedy Meade	Alice Hall	
1919	The End of the Road	Mary Lee	
1918	The Spirit of the Red Cross	Ethel	
1918	Adam and Some Eves		
1918	The Man-Eater		Credited as Peggy Adams
1917	Nutty Knitters		
1917	Faint Heart and Fair Lady		
1917	Your Obedient Servant		
1917	Chris and His Wonderful Lamp	Betty	
1913	The Widow's Suitors		Credited as Clara Adams
1913	Boy Wanted		As Clara Adams
1913	A Shower of Slippers		As Clara Adams
1913	Aunt Elsa's Visit		As Clara Adams
1913	The Office Boy's Birthday		As Clara Adams
1913	Bragg's New Suit		As Clara Adams
1912	Kitty at Boarding School		
1912	Revenge Is Sweet		As Clara Adams
1912	The Artist's Joke		As Clara Adams
1912	An Intelligent Camera		
1912	Apple Pies		As Clara Adams
1912	Kitty's Holdup		
1912	Eddie's Exploit		As Clara Adams
1912	Curing the Office Boy		As Clara Adams
1912	A Heroic Rescue		As Clara Adams
