= The Mysterious Rider (1921 film) =

1921 film

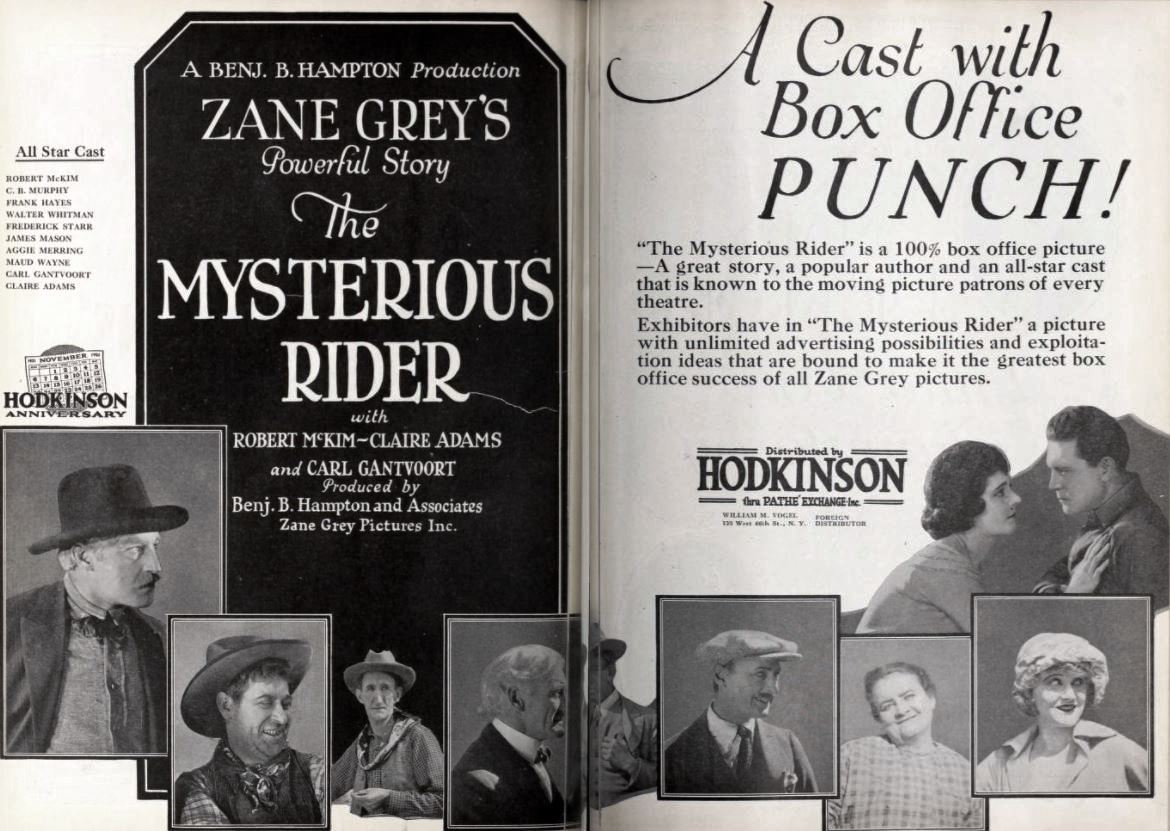
- Directed by: Benjamin B. Hampton
- Based on: The Mysterious Rider by Zane Grey
- Produced by: Benjamin B. Hampton
- Starring: Robert McKim; Claire Adams; Carl Gantvoort
- Cinematography: Joseph A. Dubray
- Production company: Zane Grey Pictures
- Distributed by: Hodkinson Pictures
- Release date: October 23, 1921
- Running time: 60 minutes
- Country: United States
- Languages: Silent; English intertitles

The Mysterious Rider is a 1921 American silent Western film directed by Benjamin B. Hampton and starring Robert McKim, Claire Adams and Carl Gantvoort. It is based on a story by Zane Grey. The story was filmed again in 1938.

== Plot ==
The film is about notorious outlaw 'Hell-Bent' Wade who returns to the ranch he once owned and takes a job disguised as a ranch hand. Unrecognized by the ranch's current owner, Bill Bellounds, he waits patiently for an opportunity to expose the men who murdered his wife twenty years ago, framed him for the crime, and then stole his ranch.

Bellounds raised an orphan girl, Columbine, as his own daughter, and intends for her to marry his son Jack, who has recently returned from prison. Though Columbine feels obligated to honour her foster father's wishes, she is in love with foreman Wilson Moore.

Jack falls under the influence of Ed Smith and Madge Smith, who draw him into a scheme to rustle cattle from his own father's ranch. Unknown to Jack, Ed Smith is the man who murdered Wade's wife and framed him for the crime. Riding by night as the Mysterious Rider, Wade closes in on Smith, leading to a dramatic confrontation between the two men.

== Cast ==
- Robert McKim as 'Hell-Bent' Wade
- Claire Adams as Columbine
- Carl Gantvoort as Wilson Moore
- Jim Mason a Jack Bellounds
- Walt Whitman as Bellounds
- Fred Starr as Ed Smith
- Maude Wayne as Madge Smith
- Frank Hayes as 'Smokey Joe' Lem Billings
- Aggie Herring as Ranch Cook Maria

== Bibliography ==
- Munden, Kenneth White. The American Film Institute Catalog of Motion Pictures Produced in the United States, Part 1. University of California Press, 1997. ISBN 978-0-520-20969-5.
