= Frankie Lee (actor) =

American actor

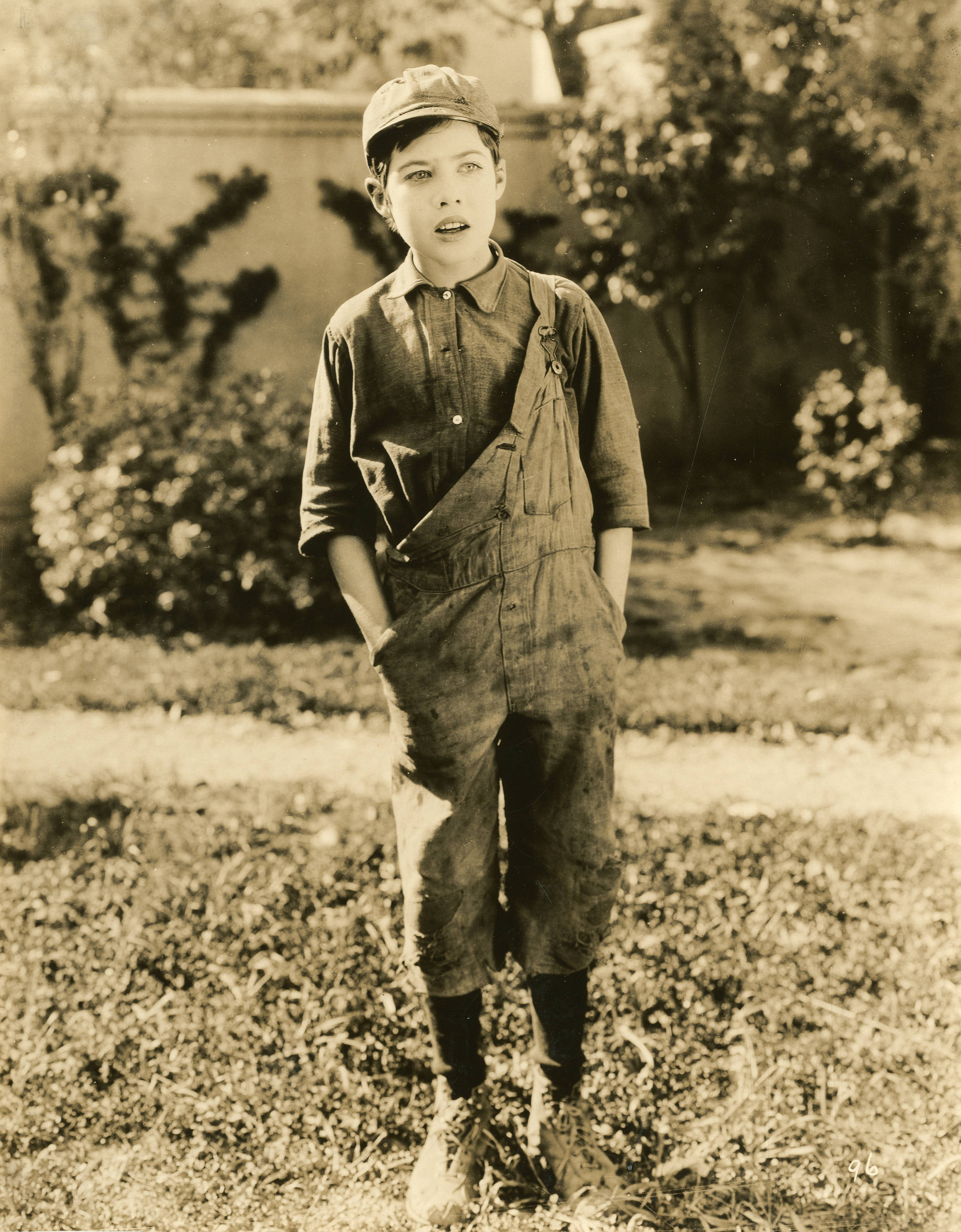
- Lee in 1923
- Born: December 31, 1911; Gunnison, Colorado, U.S.
- Died: July 29, 1970 (aged 58); Los Angeles, California, U.S.
- Cause of death: Gunshot wound injuries
- Occupation: Actor
- Years active: 1916–1925

Frankie Lee (December 31, 1911 – July 29, 1970), was an American child actor. He appeared in 56 films between 1916 and 1925. Best remembered for the 1919 film The Miracle Man, he was the little boy on crutches healed by the phony faith healer just after Lon Chaney.

He was the older brother of child actor Davey Lee.

He was born in Gunnison, Colorado, United States.

== Death ==
On July 29, 1970, Lee was shot in the head four times while he was asleep in his studio apartment in Los Angeles, California, aged 58. His cause of death was due to homicide.

== Partial filmography ==
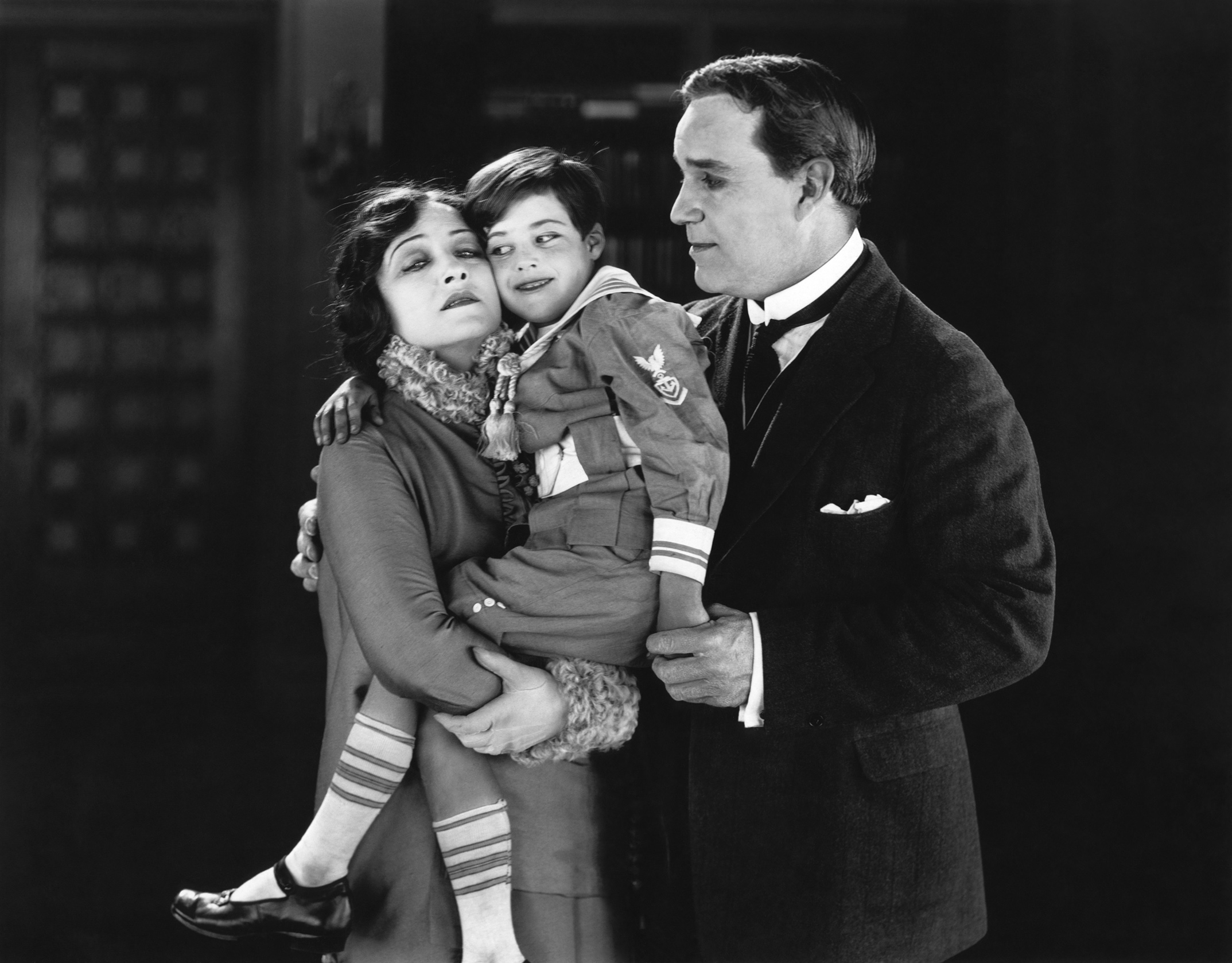
Pauline Frederick, Frankie Lee, and Percy Standing in Bonds of Love (1919).

- The Right to Be Happy (1916)
- Her Husband's Faith (1916)
- The Boss of the Lazy Y (1917)
- The Bronze Bride (1917)
- God's Crucible (1917)
- The Soul of Satan (1917)
- One Touch of Sin (1917)
- Quicksand (1918)
- Cheating the Public (1918)
- Daddy-Long-Legs (1919)
- Rough Riding Romance (1919)
- The Miracle Man (1919)
- Bonds of Love (1919)
- The Westerners (1919)
- Jinx (1919)
- Nurse Marjorie (1920)
- An Old Fashioned Boy (1920)
- Moon Madness (1920)
- Godless Men (1920)
- The Poverty of Riches (1921)
- The Foolish Matrons (1921)
- The Killer (1921)
- Shame (1921)
- The Swamp (1921)
- The Sin of Martha Queed (1921)
- The Other Woman (1921)
- Shattered Idols (1922)
- Heart's Haven (1922)
- The Scrapper (1922)
- Deserted at the Altar (1922)
- The Third Alarm (1922)
- While Justice Waits (1922)
- The Flame of Life (1923)
- The Barefoot Boy (1923)
- Children of Dust (1923)
- The Age of Desire (1923)
- The Hero (1923)
- Poisoned Paradise: The Forbidden Story of Monte Carlo (1924)
- The Golden Strain (1925)

== Bibliography ==
- Holmstrom, John. The Moving Picture Boy: An International Encyclopaedia from 1895 to 1995, Norwich, Michael Russell, 1996, pp. 53–54.
- Katchmer, George A. A Biographical Dictionary of Silent Film Western Actors and Actresses, McFarland, 2002, p. 204.
