= Benjamin B. Hampton =

American film director and producer

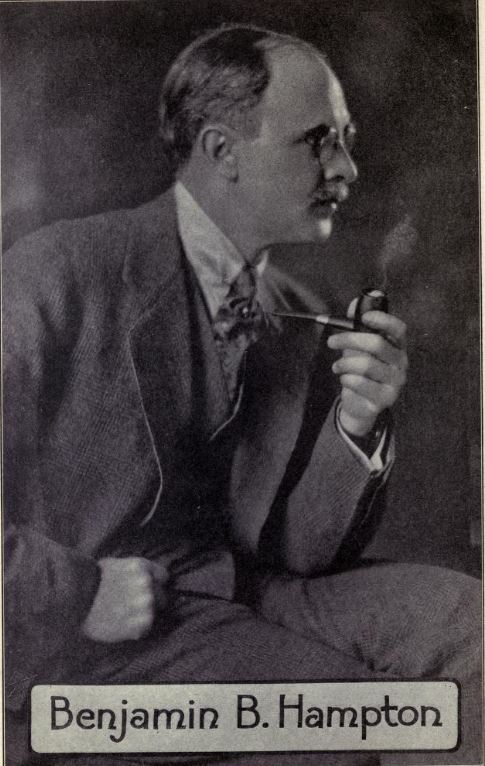

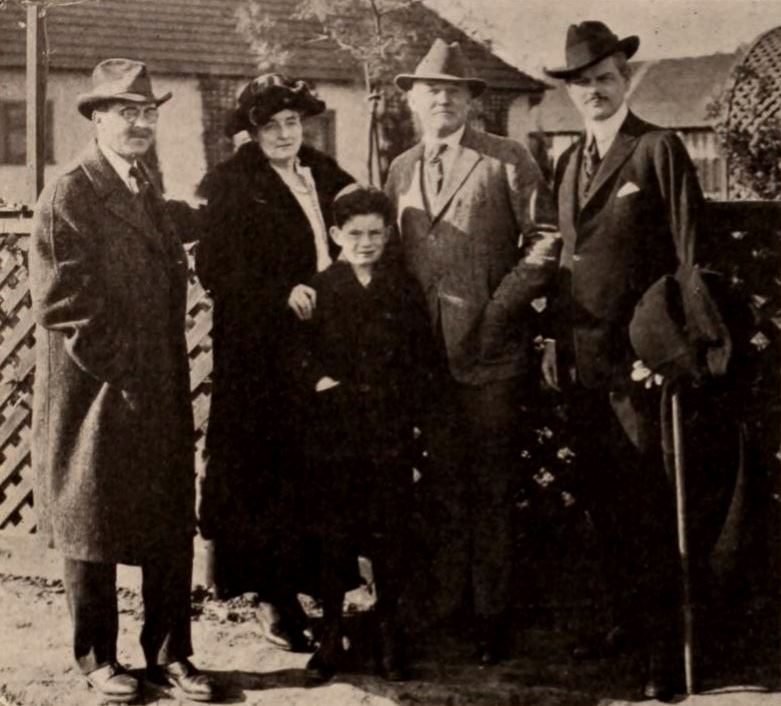
Benjamin B. Hampton with author Kathleen Norris, her son, Harry Leon Wilson, and Charles Gilman Norris

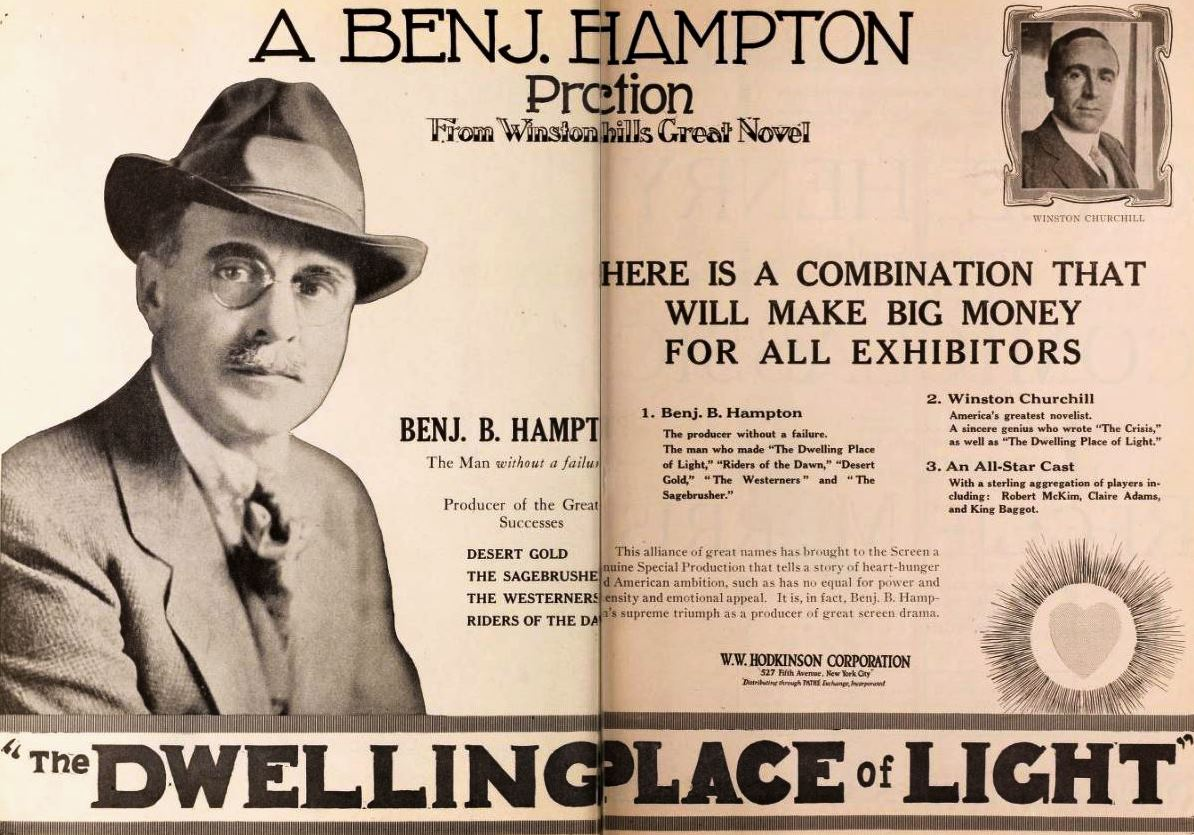
Advertisement for The Dwelling Place of Light (1920), "A Benj. B. Hampton Production"

Benjamin Bowles Hampton (1875–1932) was an American film producer, writer, and director. He led a 1916 plan to conglomerate film companies via acquisition. He was married to actress Claire Adams and was a partner in Zane Grey Pictures. He wrote the History of the American Film Industry from Its Beginnings to 1931. He is credited with producing numerous films.

== Early years ==
Hampton was born on March 19, 1875, in Macomb, Illinois, the son of Mary (aka Mamie, née Bowles) and David Hail Hampton.

== Career ==
=== Early career ===
Hampton moved to New York in 1900 after several years as a newspaper publisher and editor in Illinois. After the move he went into the advertising business, quickly becoming successful. His projects included large campaigns for companies that manufactured cigarettes. Other clients of the Ben B. Hampton Advertising Agency included the S. H. Kress & Co., with 50 stores in cities in the southern United States.

=== Magazine ===
Hampton entered the magazine business when he was able to buy The Broadway Magazine for a low price. He added his last name to the name of the publication and put his brother, Jesse, in charge of the advertising agency so that he could focus on the magazine. He published a couple of stories in Hampton's Broadway Magazine. He held copyrights on Hampton's Magazine and Hampton's Broadway Magazine. He accepted Jack London's story Mauki after it was turned down by other publications and remained committed to publishing stories of social injustices even after other publications had moved on believing readership had lost interest in that type of anti-Capitalist tale. His magazine merged with four other magazines in 1911.

=== Tobacco ===
In September 1913 Hampton became a vice-president and director of the American Tobacco Company, with his duties including being head of the company's smoking tobacco department. The Wall Street Journal reported that he had been "virtually acting in this capacity for some months". His connection to the company went back to 1900 when American Tobacco was one of his advertising clients.

=== Film ===
In 1916 Hampton became president of General Film Company, and he formed the Rex Beach Picture Company. He sold the latter in 1918 when he moved to Los Angeles to produce films. Health problems caused him to step back from direct involvement with motion pictures.

=== Book ===
Hampton wrote A History of the Movies, published by Civici-Friede in 1932. Reviewers treated the book "as a work of first importance of its kind". The book included careers of performers, changes with which the film industry had dealt, and leaders in the industry. It was reprinted by Dover Publications in 1970 with the title History of the American film industry from its beginnings to 1931.

In his book on the history of the film industry to 1932, Hampton emphasized the industry's widespread mass market appeal in the U.S.

Hampton wrote in his film history about the success of an early fight film in 1897 and the criticism of it and "Living Pictures" generally by William Randolph Hearst as Yellow Journalism.

== Personal life and death ==
Hampton was married to Maria Somers Bartleson, who died in 1922. They had three daughters and two sons. He later married actress Claire Adams. He died on January 31, 1932, in Mount Sinai Hospital in New York City.

== Selected filmography ==
=== Producer ===
- The Westerners (1919)
- Desert Gold (1919)
- Riders of the Dawn (1920)
- The Money Changers (1920)
- The Dwelling Place of Light (1920)
- A Certain Rich Man (1921)
- The Man of the Forest (1921)
- The Mysterious Rider (1921)
- The Gray Dawn (1922)
- Golden Dreams (1922), an adaptation of a Zane Grey novel
- Heart's Haven (1922)
