= Audrey Chapman =

American actress

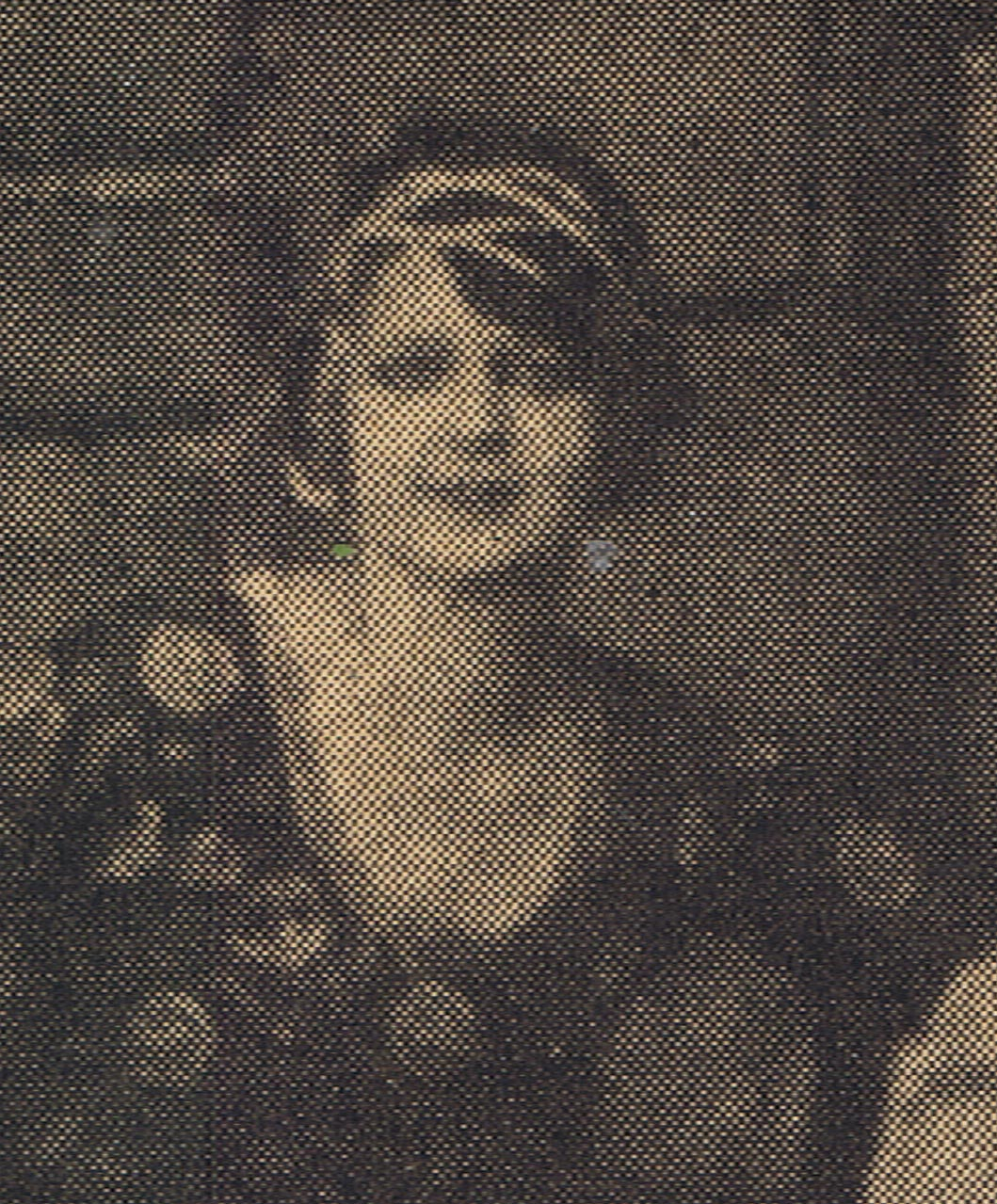
- Born: March 2, 1899; Philadelphia, Pennsylvania, U.S.
- Died: August 10, 1993 (aged 94); Riverside, California, U.S.
- Occupation: Actress
- Spouse: Richard Evan Roberts (1922 - ?)

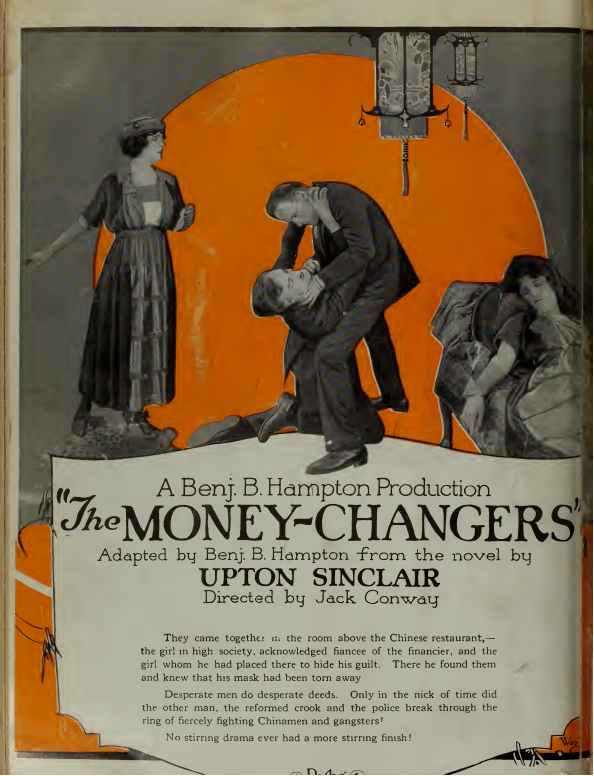
The Money-Changers by Jack Conway, 1920

Audrey Chapman (March 2, 1899 – August 10, 1993) was an actress in motion pictures of the silent film era from Philadelphia, Pennsylvania.

A niece of Hampton Del Ruth and Roy Del Ruth, Chapman was the daughter of Mr. and Mrs. Edward a Bigley. She was educated in Philadelphia and Los Angeles, California. She went from a finishing school directly into movies. In The Money Changers (film) (1920) she played the character of Mary Holmes in a photoplay written by Upton Sinclair. The setting is the "Oriental underworld" of New York City. Chapman dons twenty-two gowns in all, ranging from filmy negligee to elaborate fur-trimmed costumes.

She was among the cast of Wildfire (1921), based on a Zane Grey novel. Two complete producing crews shot the movie, which was an outdoor narrative. The setting was the mythical Spanish state of Chinora. An American mining engineer is drilling for oil there. In her final movie, Garrison's Finish (1923), Chapman was paired with Jack Pickford. The story was about the race track and racing.

Between 1918 and 1923 Chapman has ten screen credits in a brief Hollywood film career. Other movies in which she acted include Her Country First (1918), Daddy-Long-Legs with Mary Pickford, Black Sheep (1921), and Golden Dreams (1922).

On October 14, 1922, Chapman married banker Richard Evan Roberts in Los Angeles.

Chapman died in Riverside, California in 1993.
