= The Master Man =

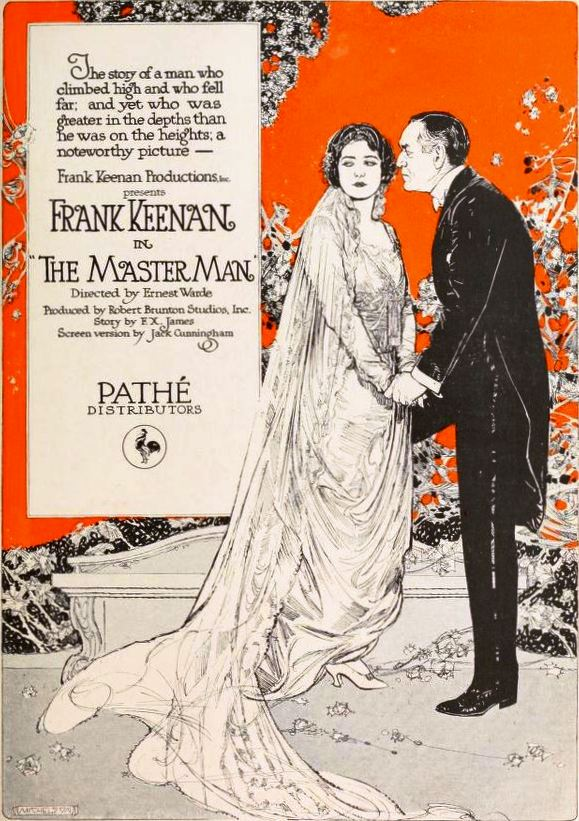
- Directed by: Ernest C. Warde
- Written by: F. X. James; Jack Cunningham
- Produced by: Frank Keenan; Robert Brunton
- Starring: Frank Keenan
- Cinematography: Charles E. Kaufman
- Distributed by: Pathé Exchange
- Release date: May 25, 1919
- Running time: 5 reels
- Country: USA
- Language: Silent ..English titles

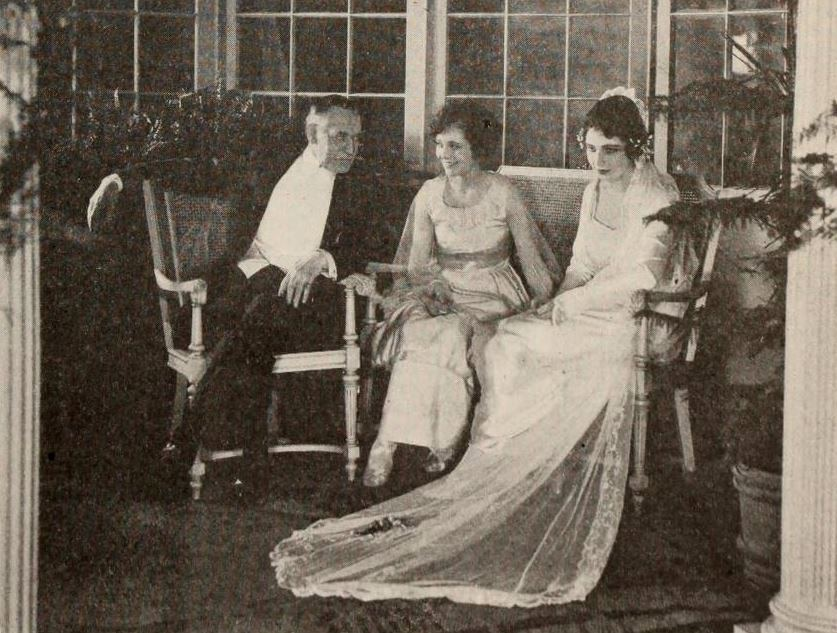
Film still featured in Exhibitors Herald

The Master Man is a 1919 silent film drama directed by Ernest C. Warde and produced by and starring Frank Keenan. It was distributed by Pathé Exchange films.

== Cast ==
- Frank Keenan - Emanuel Blake
- Kathleen Kirkham - Janice Ritter
- Joseph J. Dowling - George R. Vanter
- Joseph McManus - Mitchell Murray
- Jack Brammall - McCullough Davenport
- William V. Mong - Sebastian Ritter
- Hardee Kirkland - Gov. Wheeler
- J. Barney Sherry - Lt. Governor
- Joe Ray - Purdy Cavanaugh

== Preservation status ==
An incomplete print of the film survives in the BFI National Film and Television Archive.
