= Todd of the Times =

1919 silent film by Eliot Howe

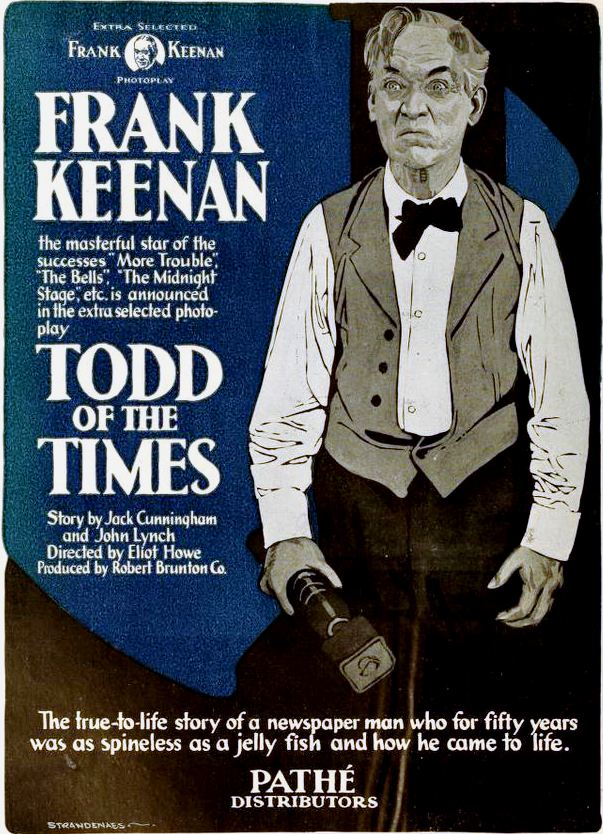
- Directed by: Eliot Howe
- Written by: Jack Cunningham; John Lynch
- Starring: Frank Keenan; Charles A. Post; Aggie Herring
- Cinematography: Charles E. Kaufman
- Production company: Robert Brunton Productions
- Distributed by: Pathé Exchange
- Release date: February 9, 1919
- Country: United States
- Language: Silent (English intertitles)

Todd of the Times is a lost 1919 American silent comedy film directed by Eliot Howe and starring Frank Keenan, Charles A. Post, and Aggie Herring.

== Cast ==
- Frank Keenan as Theobold Todd
- Charles A. Post as Roy Reynolds
- Aggie Herring as Mrs. Todd
- Herschel Mayall as Harrison G. Monroe
- George Williams as Henry Holt
- Joseph J. Dowling as Rodney Plummer
- Jay Morley as John Watson
- Irene Rich as Janet Milton
- Arthur Millett as Lee Martin
- Ruth Langdon as Marie
