= The Devil to Pay (1920 film) =

1920 film directed by Ernest C. Warde

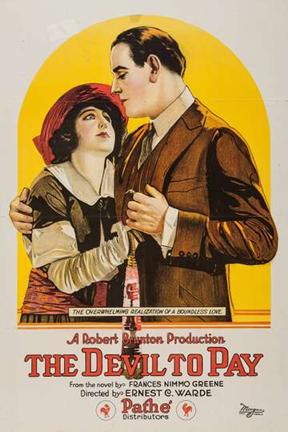
- The Devil to Pay (1920) poster
- Directed by: Ernest C. Warde
- Written by: Frances Nimmo Greene (novel); Jack Cunningham
- Produced by: Robert Brunton
- Starring: Roy Stewart; Robert McKim; Fritzi Brunette
- Cinematography: Arthur L. Todd
- Production company: Robert Brunton Productions
- Distributed by: Pathé Exchange
- Release date: November 28, 1920
- Running time: 80 minutes
- Country: United States
- Languages: Silent; English intertitles

The Devil to Pay is a 1920 American silent mystery film directed by Ernest C. Warde and starring Roy Stewart, Robert McKim and Fritzi Brunette.

== Plot ==
This synopsis is taken from a review in Wid's Daily film magazine.

Banker and politician Brent Warren commits a murder. George Roan is framed and given the death sentence for the crime. Roan returns to haunt Warren.

District attorney Cullen Grant secures evidence against Warren and orders his arrest. Dare Keeling is a wealthy girl in love with Warren and maintains her confidence in him. When she begs Warren to give her money (as he is her trustee), Grant's suspects the money is meant for Warren.

Dare's brother, Larry, wants to preserve his sister's happiness, despite being against Warren. Larry becomes Warren's secretary, and he discovers papers that prove Warren's guilt.

At Warren's trial, he is confident of an acquittal. Grant calls on Roan, who is revealed to not be dead, as a witness. Roan proves that Warren forced him to commit the murder. Warren attempts to flee before killing himself by gunshot.

== Cast ==
- Roy Stewart as Cullen Grant
- Robert McKim as Brent Warren
- Fritzi Brunette as Dare Keeling
- George Fisher as Larry Keeling
- Evelyn Selbie as Mrs. Roan
- Joseph J. Dowling as George Roan
- Richard Lapan as Dick Roan
- Mark Fenton as Dr. Jernigan
- William Marion as Detective Potter

== Reception ==
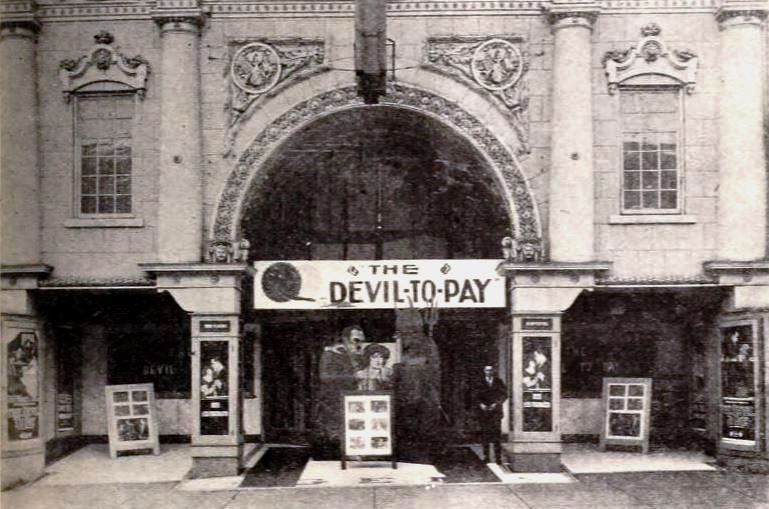
A theater showing 'The Devil to Pay.'

A review in Wid's Daily praised the film for having a "good mystery element" and sustaining the suspense. However, the reviewer criticized parts of the plot as "not plausible" and the conclusions as rushed.

== Bibliography ==
- Goble, Alan. The Complete Index to Literary Sources in Film. Walter de Gruyter, 1999.
