= The Lord Loves the Irish =

1919 silent film

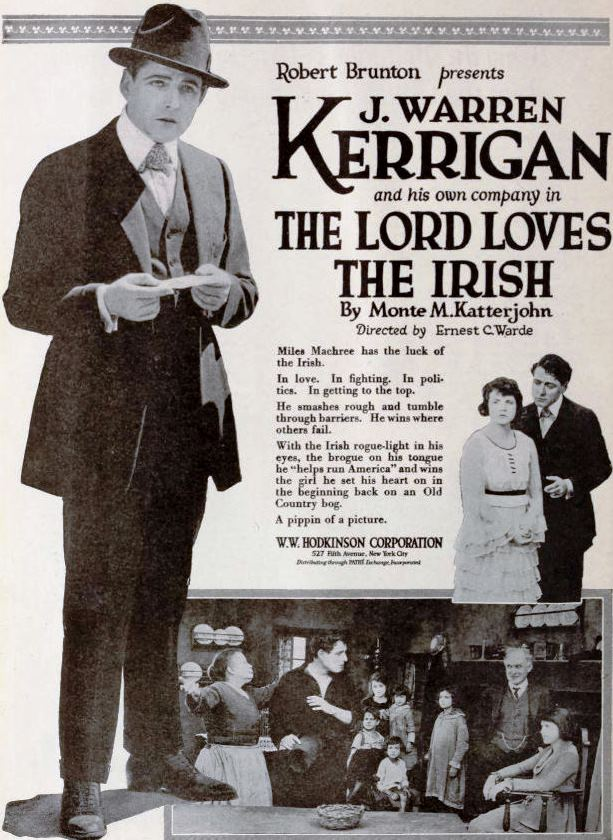
- Directed by: Ernest C. Warde
- Written by: Monte M. Katterjohn
- Produced by: Robert Brunton
- Starring: J. Warren Kerrigan; Aggie Herring; James O. Barrows
- Cinematography: Arthur L. Todd
- Production company: Robert Brunton Productions
- Distributed by: Hodkinson Pictures
- Release date: December 14, 1919
- Running time: 50 minutes
- Country: United States
- Languages: Silent; English intertitles

The Lord Loves the Irish is a 1919 American silent comedy film directed by Ernest C. Warde and starring J. Warren Kerrigan, Aggie Herring and James O. Barrows.

== Cast ==
- J. Warren Kerrigan as Miles Machree
- Aggie Herring as Mother Machree
- James O. Barrows as Timothy Lynch
- Fritzi Brunette as Sheila Lynch
- William Ellingford as Malachi Nolan
- Wedgwood Nowell as Allyn Dexter
- Joseph J. Dowling as Dr. Leon Wilson / Hugo Strauss

== Bibliography ==
- Leonhard Gmür. Rex Ingram: Hollywood's Rebel of the Silver Screen. 2013.
