= The Ridin' Streak =

1925 film directed by Del Andrews

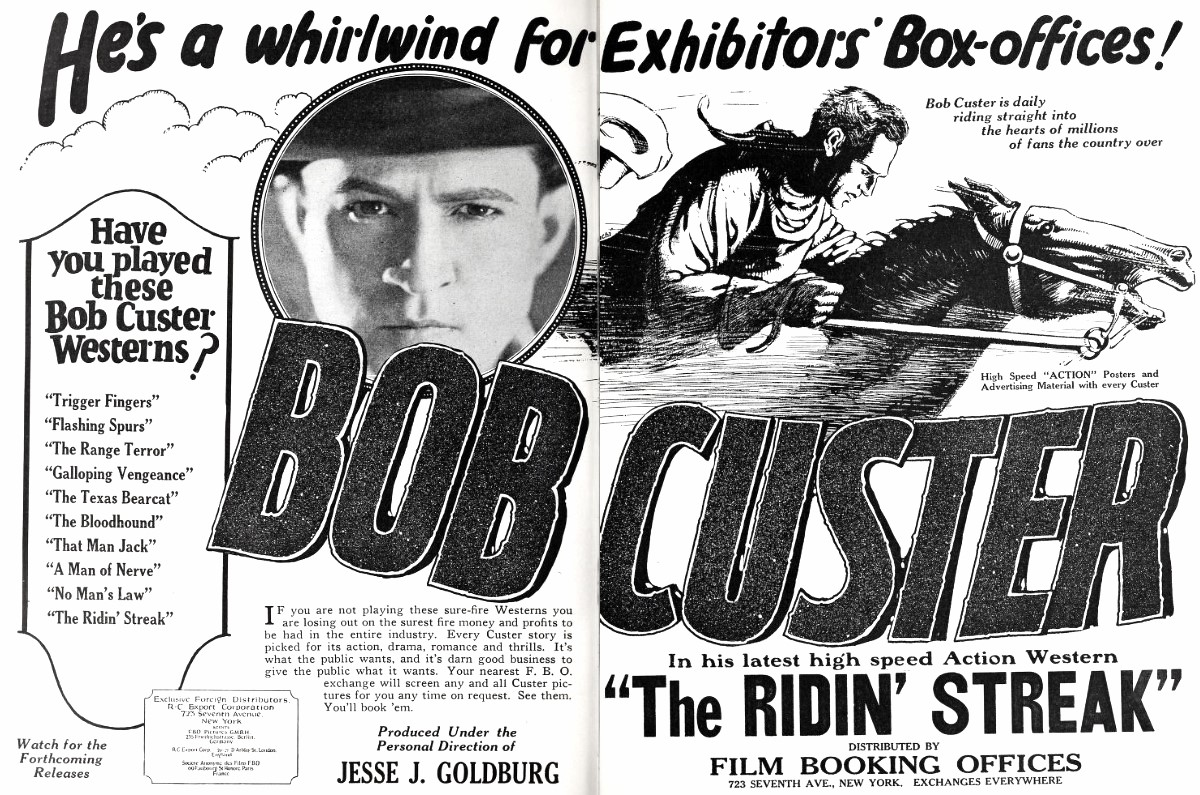
- Trade advertisement
- Directed by: Del Andrews
- Written by: William Elwell Oliver; James Ormont
- Produced by: Jesse J. Goldburg
- Starring: Bob Custer; Roy Laidlaw; Frank Brownlee
- Cinematography: Tony Kornman
- Production company: Independent Pictures
- Distributed by: Film Booking Offices of America
- Release date: November 29, 1925
- Running time: 50 minutes
- Country: United States
- Language: Silent (English intertitles)

The Ridin' Streak is a 1925 American silent Western film directed by Del Andrews and starring Bob Custer, Roy Laidlaw, and Frank Brownlee.

== Plot ==
As described in a film magazine review, the young sheriff of a Western town saves a young woman’s fortune from falling into the hands of a scheming scoundrel and later saves her from the importunities of a fortune hunter. Through a clever ruse, he wins a $5,000 purse after defeating the hirelings the villain has bribed to prevent his success. The culmination of his romance with the young woman takes the form of wedding preparations.

== Cast ==
- Bob Custer as Bill Pendleton
- Peggy Udell as Ruth Howells
- Roy Laidlaw as Judge Howells
- Frank Brownlee as J.S. Dokes
- Newton Barbar as Gus Dokes
- Billy Lord as Tim
- Bill Cody as Leete Gleed
- Claude Payton as Sheriff

== Bibliography ==
- Connelly, Robert B. The Silents: Silent Feature Films, 1910-36, Volume 40, Issue 2. December Press, 1998.
- Munden, Kenneth White. The American Film Institute Catalog of Motion Pictures Produced in the United States, Part 1. University of California Press, 1997.
