= Ernest C. Warde =

British actor

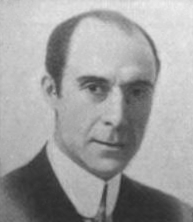
- In the Dramatic Mirror, 26 January 1918
- Born: 10 August 1874; Liverpool, United Kingdom
- Died: 9 September 1923 (aged 49); Los Angeles, United States
- Occupations: Actor; Film director
- Years active: 1915-1923

Ernest C. Warde (10 August 1874 – 9 September 1923) was an English actor and director who worked in American silent film. He contributed to more than forty films from 1914 to 1923. He was the son of stage actor Frederick Warde.

== Selected filmography ==
- The White Rose (1914)
- A Newspaper Nemesis (1915)
- The Undertow (1915)
- The Skinflint (1915)
- Silas Marner (1916)
- The Man Without a Country (1917)
- War and the Woman (1917)
- Her Beloved Enemy (1917)
- The Woman in White (1917)
- The Vicar of Wakefield (1917)
- Ruler of the Road (1918)
- Prisoners of the Pines (1918)
- One Dollar Bid (1918)
- A Burglar for a Night (1918)
- Three X Gordon (1918)
- More Trouble (1918)
- The Bells (1918)
- The Midnight Stage (1919)
- The Master Man (1919)
- The False Code (1919)
- The Lord Loves the Irish (1919)
- A White Man's Chance (1919)
- The World Aflame (1919)
- The Joyous Liar (1919)
- The House of Whispers (1920)
- Live Sparks (1920)
- $30,000 (1920)
- The Dream Cheater (1920)
- The Devil to Pay (1920)
- The Green Flame (1920)
- The Coast of Opportunity (1920)
- Number 99 (1920)
- Trail of the Axe (1922)
