= The Footlight Ranger =

1923 film

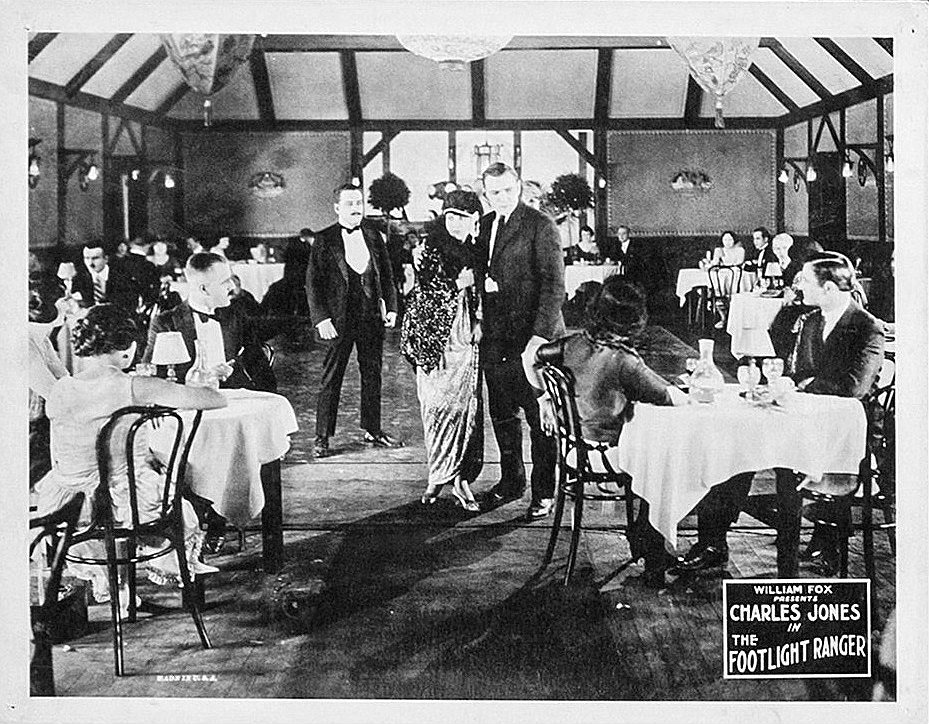
- Lobby card
- Directed by: Scott R. Dunlap
- Screenplay by: Dorothy Yost
- Story by: William Branch
- Starring: Buck Jones; Fritzi Brunette; James Mason; Lillian Langdon; Lydia Yeamans Titus; Henry A. Barrows
- Cinematography: Devereaux Jennings
- Production company: Fox Film Corporation
- Distributed by: Fox Film Corporation
- Release date: January 14, 1923
- Running time: 50 minutes
- Country: United States
- Languages: Silent; English intertitles

The Footlight Ranger is a lost 1923 American silent Western film directed by Scott R. Dunlap and written by Dorothy Yost. The film stars Buck Jones, Fritzi Brunette, James Mason, Lillian Langdon, Lydia Yeamans Titus and Henry A. Barrows. The film was released on January 14, 1923, by Fox Film Corporation.

== Plot ==
As described in a film magazine, small town idler Bill Moreland meets and falls in love with Janet Ainslee, a young actress who is stranded in town along with her company. Janet accepts the favors of Al Brownley, son of the richest man in town, in hopes of getting enough money from him to get back to the New York City. On the morning the company is set to leave, Brownley appears with the tickets but insists that Janet go for a ride with him first. Bill overhears this conversation and interferes. He raises enough money selling his three prize dogs to buy tickets for Janet. Janet advises him to come to New York City and get a job. Sometime later, Bill goes to the city and while working is caught in an accident. He is sent to a hospital and Janet sends him flowers. She gets a new "angel" to back her and almost forgets about Bill. After he recovers, he and a friend go to a roadhouse and rescue Janet from the attacks of this other man. Janet is then ready to marry him and return to the country.

== Cast ==
- Buck Jones as Bill Moreland (credited as Charles Jones)
- Fritzi Brunette as Janet Ainslee
- James Mason as Al Brownley (credited as James Mason)
- Lillian Langdon as Nellie Andrews
- Lydia Yeamans Titus as Miss Amelia
- Henry A. Barrows as David Marsh (credited as Henry Barrows)

== Preservation ==
With no holdings located in archives, The Footlight Ranger is considered a lost film.
