= The Ghost of the Rancho =

1918 film

- Directed by: William Worthington
- Written by: Jack Cunningham; Arthur Henry Gooden
- Starring: Bryant Washburn; Rhea Mitchell; Joseph J. Dowling
- Cinematography: Charles E. Kaufman
- Production company: Anderson-Brunton Company
- Distributed by: Pathé Exchange
- Release date: August 11, 1918
- Running time: 50 minutes
- Country: United States
- Languages: Silent; English intertitles

The Ghost of the Rancho is a 1918 American silent Western film directed by William Worthington and starring Bryant Washburn, Rhea Mitchell and Joseph J. Dowling.

== Cast ==
- Bryant Washburn as Jeffrey Wall
- Rhea Mitchell as Mary Drew
- Joseph J. Dowling as Jeffrey's Grandfather

== Reception ==
Exhibitors Herald gave a positive review. The reviewer criticized the lead actors for their performances "Washburn is not convincing as a lover, nor is Rhea Mitchell" but said that the direction "smoothed over the rough edges." The film was also praised for its excellent outdoor scenery.
