= Unto Those Who Sin =

1916 film by William Robert Daly

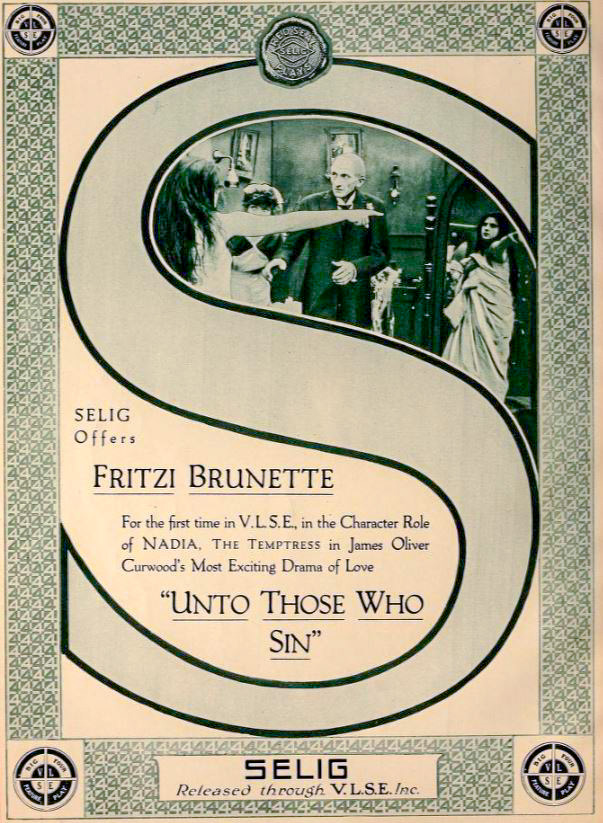
- Advertisement
- Directed by: William Robert Daly
- Written by: James Oliver Curwood; C.B. Hoadley
- Produced by: William Nicholas Selig
- Starring: Fritzi Brunette; Earle Foxe; Lillian Hayward
- Cinematography: E.J. Sherman
- Production company: Selig Polyscope Company
- Distributed by: V-L-S-E
- Release date: March 6, 1916
- Running time: 50 minutes
- Country: United States
- Languages: Silent; English intertitles

Unto Those Who Sin is a 1916 American silent drama film directed by William Robert Daly and starring Fritzi Brunette, Earle Foxe, and Lillian Hayward.

== Cast ==
- Fritzi Brunette as Nadia
- Al W. Filson as Pierre Duprez
- Lillian Hayward as Mme. Duprez
- Marion Warner as Mabel
- Edward Peil Sr. as Stokes
- Earle Foxe as Ashton
- George Larkin as Phillip Morton
- William Sheer as Amos Lawlor
- George Hernandez as Jules Villars
- Louise Sothern as Isobel
- Marie Prevost as Celeste
- Jack Albert as Buttons

== Bibliography ==
- Brent E. Walker. Mack Sennett’s Fun Factory: A History and Filmography of His Studio and His Keystone and Mack Sennett Comedies, with Biographies of Players and Personnel. McFarland, 2013.
