= Joseph J. Dowling =

American actor

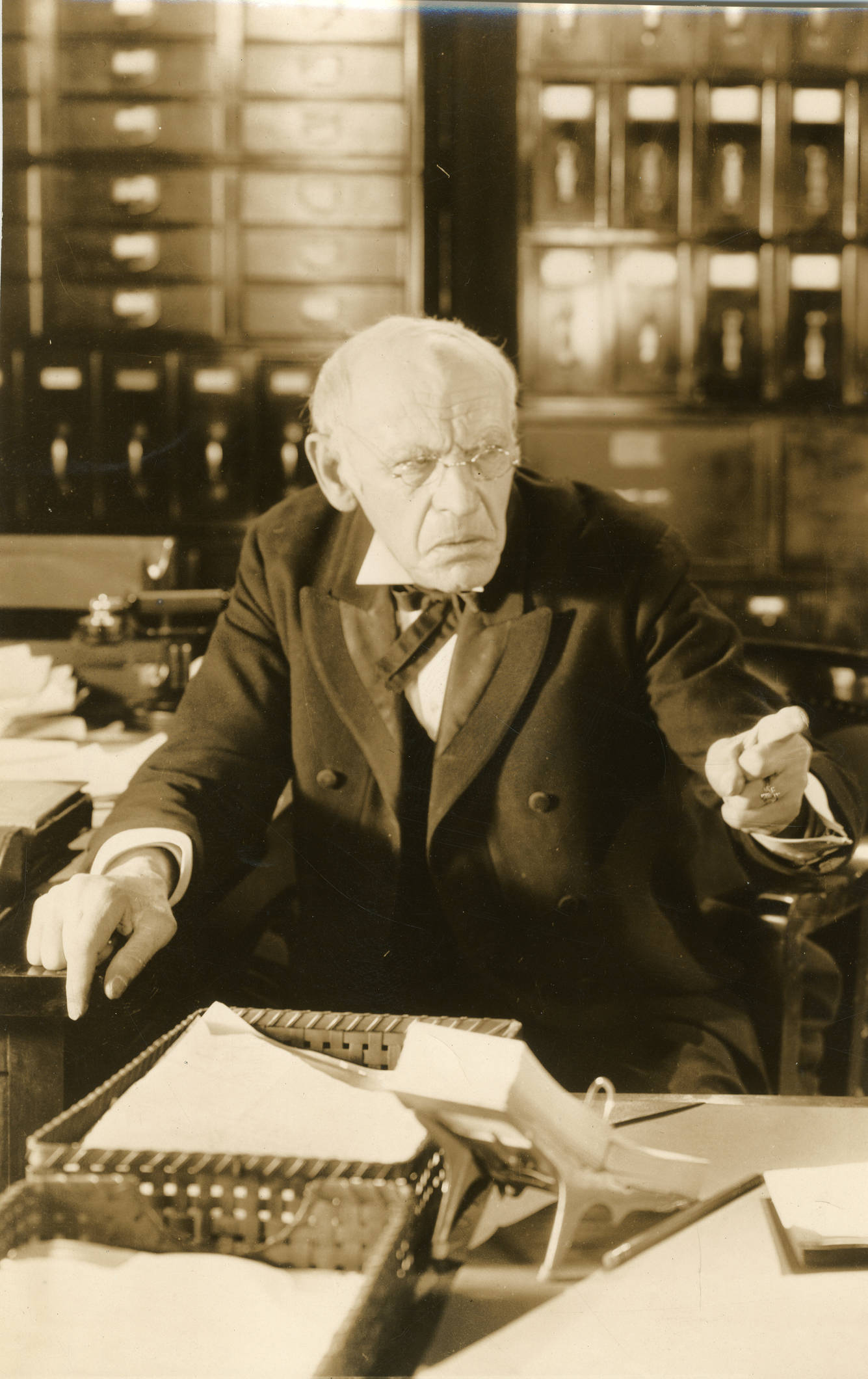
- Dowling in 1923
- Born: Joseph Johnson Dowling; September 4, 1850; Pittsburgh, Pennsylvania, U.S.
- Died: July 8, 1928 (aged 77); Hollywood, California, U.S.
- Occupation: Actor
- Years active: 1913–1928
- Spouses: Sarah Ann Hassen (m. 1882–1893) Myra L. Davis (before 1928)
- Children: 1

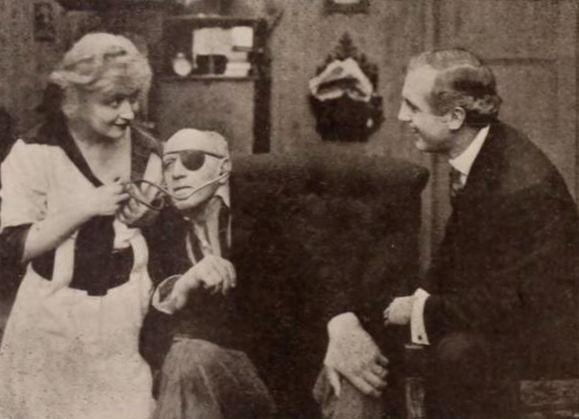
left to right: Bessie Barriscale, Joseph Dowling, ?unidentified player. Blindfolded (1918)

Joseph Johnson Dowling (September 4, 1850 – July 8, 1928) was an American stage and silent film actor.

== Early life and career ==
Born in Pittsburgh, the son of James and Fredericka (nee Edstrem) Dowling. His father was a native of Pennsylvania while his mother immigrated from Sweden. He had two siblings, Laura and James, both of whom predeceased Dowling.

As a young boy, Dowling served as a drummer in Company G of the 29th Iowa Infantry during the Civil War.

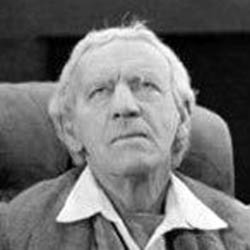
Dowling in a scene from the lost film The Miracle Man (1919)

Dowling began his career on the stage and in vaudeville before he made his film debut in 1913 in Sleuthing. He later appeared in many films with Charles Ray (with whom he appeared in five other features) and William S. Hart. He is best remembered for playing the Patriarch, one of four main characters, in the now lost film The Miracle Man (1919). Dowling continued to appear in major Hollywood silent productions including Little Lord Fauntleroy (1921) with Mary Pickford, Quincy Adams Sawyer (1922) with Lon Chaney and Blanche Sweet, The Christian (1923) with Richard Dix and Mae Busch, One Night in Rome with Laurette Taylor and the Victor Fleming directed Lord Jim (1925).

== Personal life ==
Dowling was married twice. His first marriage was to actress Sarah J. "Sadie" Hassen (née Berry) born on May 29, 1853. The couple performed together in the play Nobody's Claim, which was written specifically for them by Edwin A. Locke. The play was a hit and the two traveled around the United States performing it. They eventually settled in Mount Clemens, Michigan, in 1886. They had a son, Joseph F., in September 1890, and divorced in 1893. He later married actress Myra L. Davis to whom he remained married until his death.

== Death ==
Dowling died on July 8, 1928, in Hollywood. He was survived by his second wife, Myra, and his son from his first marriage.

== Selected filmography ==
- The Bargain (1914)
- The Beckoning Flame (1915)
- The Stepping Stone (1916)
- The Apostle of Vengeance (1916)
- Somewhere in France (1916)
- The Gunfighter (1917)
- Sudden Jim (1917)
- The Yankee Way (1917)
- Paddy O'Hara (1917)
- The Iced Bullet (1917)
- Wooden Shoes (1917)
- The Pinch Hitter (1917)
- Alimony (1917)
- Madam Who? (1918)
- A Law Unto Herself (1918)
- Patriotism (1918)
- An Alien Enemy (1918)
- Carmen of the Klondike (1918)
- More Trouble (1918)
- Maid o' the Storm (1918)
- A Man's Man (1918)
- With Hoops of Steel (1918)
- The Ghost of the Rancho (1918)
- Humdrum Brown (1918)
- One Dollar Bid (1918)
- His Robe of Honor (1918)
- Blindfolded (1918)
- A Little Sister of Everybody (1918)
- The Bells (1918)
- All of a Sudden Norma (1919)
- The Midnight Stage (1919)
- Adele (1919)
- Beckoning Roads (1919)
- A White Man's Chance (1919)
- Kitty Kelly, M.D. (1919)
- The Lord Loves the Irish (1919)
- The Miracle Man (1919)
- Her Purchase Price (1919)
- The False Code (1919)
- The Master Man (1919)
- Todd of the Times (1919)
- The Joyous Liar (1919)
- Big Happiness (1920)
- Everybody's Sweetheart (1920)
- A Splendid Hazard (1920)
- Riders of the Dawn (1920)
- The Devil to Pay (1920)
- Live Sparks (1920)
- The Kentucky Colonel (1920)
- $30,000 (1920)
- The Dream Cheater (1920)
- The U.P. Trail (1920)
- The House of Whispers (1920)
- The Beautiful Liar (1921)
- The Sin of Martha Queed (1921)
- The Breaking Point (1921)
- A Certain Rich Man (1921)
- Fightin' Mad (1921)
- The Grim Comedian (1921)
- The Other Woman (1921)
- The Lure of Egypt (1921)
- The Spenders (1921)
- The Half Breed (1922)
- The Pride of Palomar (1922)
- The Danger Point (1922)
- Trail of the Axe (1922)
- The Girl Who Ran Wild (1922)
- The Christian (1923)
- Tiger Rose (1923)
- Enemies of Children (1923)
- Dollar Devils (1923)
- The Girl Who Came Back (1923)
- The Spider and the Rose (1923)
- The Courtship of Miles Standish (1923)
- The Gaiety Girl (1924)
- Women Who Give (1924)
- Untamed Youth (1924)
- Tess of the D'Urbervilles (1924)
- One Night in Rome (1924)
- Those Who Dare (1924)
- Unseen Hands (1924)
- Her Night of Romance (1924)
- New Lives for Old (1925)
- Flower of the Night (1925)
- Confessions of a Queen (1925)
- Lord Jim (1925)
- Why Girls Go Back Home (1926)
