= While Satan Sleeps =

1922 film

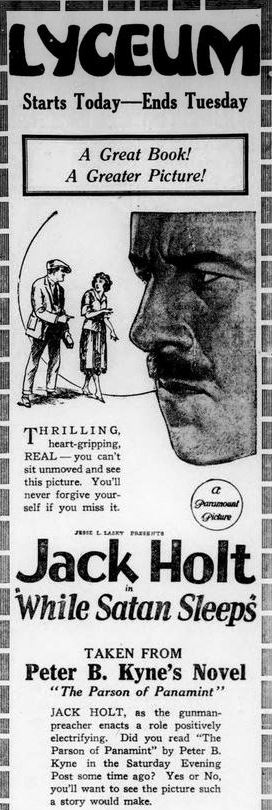
- Newspaper advertisement
- Directed by: Joseph Henabery
- Screenplay by: Albert S. Le Vino
- Based on: "The Parson of Panamint" by Peter B. Kyne
- Produced by: Jesse L. Lasky
- Starring: Jack Holt; Wade Boteler; Mabel Van Buren; Fritzi Brunette; Will Walling; J. P. Lockney
- Cinematography: Faxon M. Dean; René Guissart
- Production company: Famous Players–Lasky Corporation
- Distributed by: Paramount Pictures
- Release date: June 22, 1922
- Running time: 70 minutes
- Country: United States
- Languages: Silent; English intertitles

While Satan Sleeps is a 1922 American silent Western film directed by Joseph Henabery and written by Albert S. Le Vino based upon a story by Peter B. Kyne. It stars Jack Holt, Wade Boteler, Mabel Van Buren, Fritzi Brunette, Will Walling and J. P. Lockney. The film was released by Paramount Pictures on June 22, 1922. It is now considered lost.

== Cast ==
- Jack Holt as Phil
- Wade Boteler as Red Barton
- Mabel Van Buren as Sunflower Sadie
- Fritzi Brunette as Salome Deming
- Will Walling as Bud Deming
- J. P. Lockney as Chuckkawalla Bill
- Fred Huntley as Absolom Randall
- Bobbie Mack as Bones
- Sylvia Ashton as Mrs. Bones
- Herbert Standing as Bishop
