= The Dream Cheater =

1920 American silent horror film

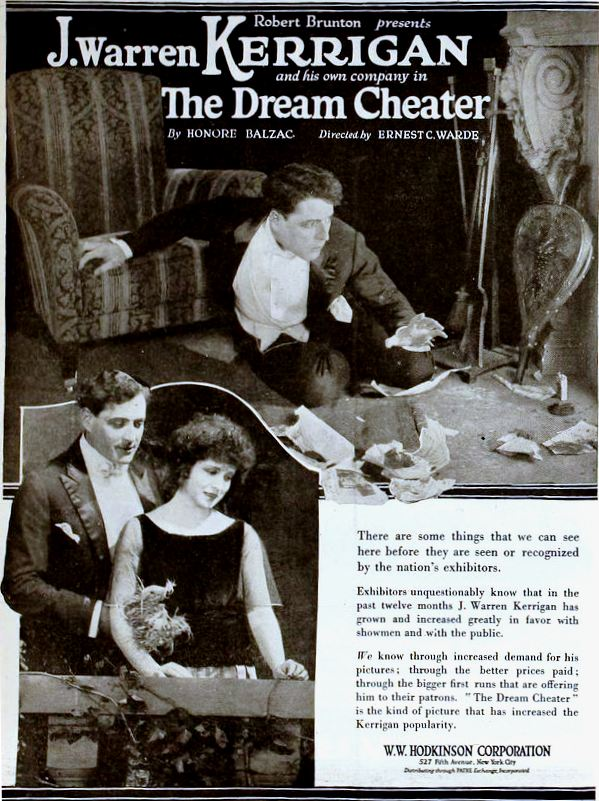
- Directed by: Ernest C. Warde
- Written by: Jack Cunningham
- Based on: La Peau de chagrin by Honoré de Balzac
- Starring: J. Warren Kerrigan; Wedgwood Nowell; Fritzi Brunette
- Cinematography: Arthur L. Todd
- Production company: Robert Brunton Productions
- Distributed by: Hodkinson Pictures
- Release date: April 4, 1920
- Running time: 50 minutes
- Country: United States
- Languages: Silent; English intertitles

The Dream Cheater is a 1920 American silent horror film directed by Ernest C. Warde and starring J. Warren Kerrigan, Wedgwood Nowell and Fritzi Brunette. It is based on the 1831 novel La Peau de chagrin by Honoré de Balzac.

== Cast ==
- J. Warren Kerrigan as Brandon McShane
- Wedgwood Nowell as Angus Burton
- Alice Wilson as Mimi Gascoigne
- Joseph J. Dowling as Shib Mizah
- Tom Guise as Patrick Fitz-George
- Fritzi Brunette as Pauline Mahon
- Aggie Herring as Mrs. Mahon
- Sam Sothern as Shamus McShane

== Bibliography ==
- Soister, John T., Nicolella, Henry & Joyce, Steve. American Silent Horror, Science Fiction and Fantasy Feature Films, 1913-1929. McFarland, 2014.
