= The White Rose (1914 film) =

- Directed by: Jack Harvey
- Starring: Boyd Marshall; Muriel Ostriche; Ernest C. Warde
- Production company: Thanhouser Company
- Release date: December 25, 1914
- Country: USA
- Language: Silent

The White Rose is a 1914 American short silent drama film, directed by Jack Harvey for the Thanhouser Company. It stars Boyd Marshall, Muriel Ostriche, and Ernest C. Warde.

== Plot ==
George Bolton - the reckless and undisciplined son of a small-town baker - gains a reputation as a local show-off. His aloof behavior drives a wedge between him and his father, and he grows careless of his devoted sweetheart, Nell Morrison. Convinced that his hometown of Elmwood offers him nothing, George gathers his savings, takes his banjo, and leaves for New York in search of excitement.

As he heads for the train, Nell catches up with him and silently hands him the white rose she has been wearing. George accepts it lightly, but as he boards the train, he tosses it away with a laugh, dismissing both the flower and what it represents.

Life in the city proves far harsher than George expects. He fails repeatedly to find respectable work in the theater and eventually settles for performing ragtime songs in a basement tavern. Poor wages and constant drinking drag him further downward. One evening, a white rose ends up in George’s hands. The sight of it stirs memories of Nell and the life he abandoned.

Overcome with regret, George shatters his banjo in a moment of clarity and storms out of the tavern, beginning the long journey back home on foot. Exhausted and unkempt, he finally reaches his father’s workplace. Nell enters and sees him in this state. Moved by George’s sincere plea for forgiveness and a chance to rebuild his life, his father agrees to take him back. When George produces the now-withered rose he has carried with him, Nell embraces him, sealing her forgiveness with a kiss.

== Characters ==
Boyd Marshall as George Bolton

Muriel Ostriche as Nell Morrison.

Ernest C. Warde as George's Father
