= War and the Woman =

- Directed by: Ernest C. Warde
- Written by: Philip Lonergan
- Produced by: Edwin Thanhouser
- Starring: Florence La Badie; Ernest C. Warde; Tom Brooke
- Cinematography: William Zollinger
- Production company: Thanhouser Film Corporation
- Distributed by: Pathé Exchange
- Release date: September 9, 1917
- Country: United States
- Languages: Silent; English intertitles

War and the Woman is a 1917 silent war drama film directed by Ernest C. Warde and starring Florence La Badie, Ernest C. Warde and Tom Brooke.

== Cast ==
- Florence La Badie as Ruth Norton—Braun's Stepdaughter
- Ernest C. Warde as Lieutenant Fredericks
- Tom Brooke as John Braun
- Wayne Arey as John Barker
- Grace Henderson as Barker's Mother
- Arthur Bauer as Commander of Invading Army

== Bibliography ==
- Robert T. Eberwein. The War Film. Rutgers University Press, 2004.
