= Live Sparks =

1920 film directed by Ernest C. Warde

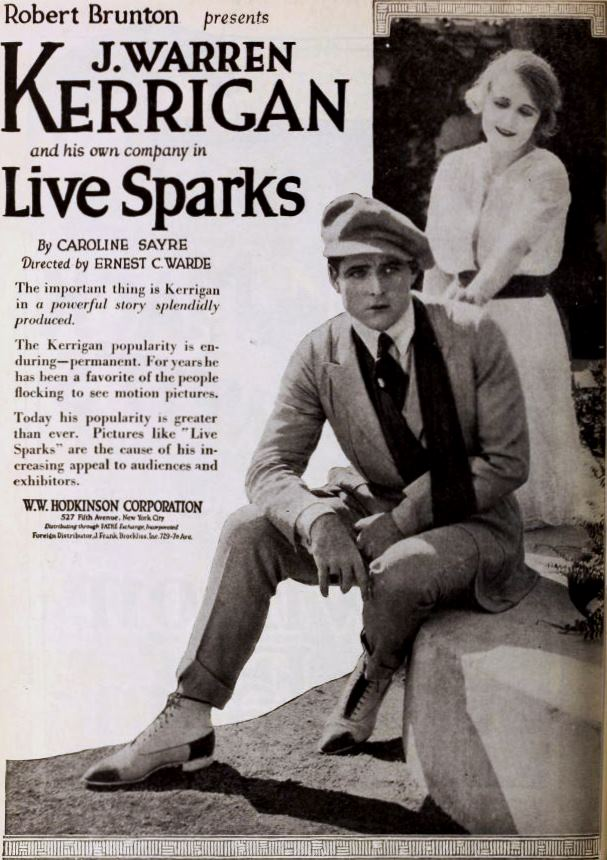
- Directed by: Ernest C. Warde
- Written by: Jack Cunningham; Caroline Sayre
- Produced by: Robert Brunton
- Starring: J. Warren Kerrigan; Mae Talbot; Roy Laidlaw
- Cinematography: Arthur L. Todd
- Production company: Robert Brunton Productions
- Distributed by: Pathé Exchange; W. W. Hodkinson Corporation
- Release date: January 18, 1920
- Running time: 50 minutes
- Country: United States
- Language: Silent (English intertitles)

Live Sparks is a 1920 American silent comedy film directed by Ernest C. Warde and starring J. Warren Kerrigan, Mae Talbot, and Roy Laidlaw.

== Cast ==
- J. Warren Kerrigan as Neil Sparks
- Mae Talbot as Aunt Helen
- Roy Laidlaw as Hiram Craig
- Fritzi Brunette as Myrtle Pratt
- Clyde Benson as William Carpenter
- Beth Ivins as Bess Kinloch
- Zelma Maja as Phyllis Gwynne
- John Steppling as Jacob Abbott
- Arthur Millett as Henry Lavigne
- Joseph J. Dowling as David Pratt

== Bibliography ==
- George A. Katchmer. Eighty Silent Film Stars: Biographies and Filmographies of the Obscure to the Well Known. McFarland, 1991.
