= Sam De Grasse =

Canadian actor (1875–1953)

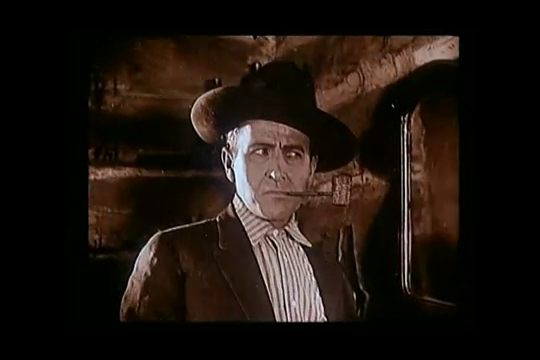
- De Grasse in Heart o' the Hills (1919)
- Born: Samuel Alfred De Grasse; June 12, 1875; Bathurst, New Brunswick, Canada
- Died: November 29, 1953 (aged 78); Hollywood, California, U.S.
- Resting place: Forest Lawn Memorial Park
- Occupation: Actor
- Years active: 1914–1930
- Spouses: Annie McDonnell (m. 1904; died 1909) Ada Fuller Golden (m. 1912)
- Children: 2
- Relatives: Joseph De Grasse (brother); Robert de Grasse (nephew)

Samuel Alfred De Grasse (June 12, 1875 – November 29, 1953) was a Canadian actor. He was the uncle of cinematographer Robert De Grasse.

== Biography ==
Samuel Alfred De Grasse was born in Bathurst, New Brunswick to Lange De Grasse and Helene (née Comeau), both of French-Canadian descent. He trained to be a dentist, and married Annie McDonnell in 1904. Their daughter, Clementine Bell, was born in 1906. Annie died in 1909 while giving birth to another daughter, Olive, who also died. In 1910, Samuel was practicing dentistry and he and his daughter Clementine were living in Providence, Rhode Island along with his older sister, Mrs. Clementine Fauchy, and her 14-year-old son, Jerome Fauchy.

He married British actress Ada Fuller Golden and became a step-father to her three children. His own elder brother, Joe, went into the fledgling movie business and Sam decided to also give it a try. He traveled to New York City and, in 1912, he appeared in his first motion picture. At first he played standard secondary characters such as Dr. Robert Armstrong in Blind Husbands (1919), but when fellow Canadian Mary Pickford set up her own studio with her husband Douglas Fairbanks, he joined them. He portrayed the villainous Prince John in Douglas Fairbanks' 1922 Robin Hood. Afterward, he began to specialize in crafty or slimy villainous roles, such as Senator Charles Summer in The Birth of a Nation (1915), the mill owner Arthur Jenkins in Intolerance (1916), John Carver in The Courtship of Miles Standish (1923), Colonel Lestron in The Eagle of the Sea (1926), a pirate lieutenant in The Black Pirate (1926), a Pharisee in The King of Kings (1927) and King James in The Man Who Laughs (1928). Mary Pickford named him as one of her favorite stars.

In the 1960s, Jackie Coogan claimed Jean Harlow had lived in De Grasse's apartment for two years and was married to him when she was 16. At the time both de Grasse and Harlow were deceased. The claim was untrue -- Harlow was married to Charles McGrew when she was 16. However, she did appear as an extra in the film Honor Bound (1928), in which De Grasse played "Blood Keller".

== Death ==
De Grasse lived on the west coast until his death at age 78 in Hollywood from a heart attack during his sleep. He is interred in the Forest Lawn Memorial Park Cemetery in Glendale, California.

== Selected filmography ==
- The Birth of a Nation (1915) – Sen. Charles Sumner (uncredited)
- A Man and His Mate (1915) – Choo
- A Child of God (1915) – Jim MacPherson
- Martyrs of the Alamo (1915) – Silent Smith
- Cross Currents (1915) – Silas Randolph
- The Price of Power (1916) – James Garwood
- Acquitted (1916) – Ira Wolcott
- The Good Bad-Man (1916) – The Wolf / Bud Frazer
- An Innocent Magdalene (1916) – Forbes Stewart
- The Half-Breed (1916) – Sheriff Dunn
- Intolerance (1916) – Arthur Jenkins
- Diane of the Follies (1916) – Phillips Christy
- The Children of the Feud (1916) – Dr. Richard Cavanagh
- Jim Bludso (1917) – Ben Merrill
- Her Official Fathers (1917) – Ethan Dexter
- An Old-Fashioned Young Man (1917) – Harold T. King
- Madame Bo-Peep (1917) – Jose Alvarez
- Wild and Woolly (1917) – Steve Shelby – Indian Agent
- The Empty Gun (1917, Short) – Jim
- Anything Once (1917) – Herbert Wendling
- The Winged Mystery (1917) – Mortimer Eddington
- The Scarlet Car (1917) – Ernest Peabody
- Six-Shooter Andy (1918) – Tom Slade
- Brace Up (1918) – National Jim
- The Guilt of Silence (1918) – Gambler Joe
- The Mortgaged Wife (1918) – Meyer
- Smashing Through (1918) – Earl Foster
- Winner Takes All (1918) – Mark Thorne
- A Woman's Fool (1918) – Minor Role
- A Law Unto Herself (1918) – Kurt Von Klassner
- The Narrow Path (1918) – Malcolm Dion
- The Hope Chest (1918) – Ballantyne, Sr.
- Sis Hopkins (1919) – Vibert
- The Silk-Lined Burglar (1919) – Boston Blackie
- The Exquisite Thief (1919) – Shaver Michael
- Heart o' the Hills (1919) – Steve Honeycutt
- Blind Husbands (1919) – The Husband, Dr. Robert Armstrong
- Uncharted Channels (1920) – Nicholas Schonnn
- Moon Madness (1920) – Adrien
- The Devil's Pass Key (1920) – Warren Goodwright
- The Skywayman (1920) – Dr. Wayne Leveridge
- The Little Grey Mouse (1920) – John Cumberland
- Unseen Forces (1920) – Captain Stanley
- The Broken Gate (1920) – 'Hod' Brooks
- The Cheater Reformed (1921) – Thomas Edinburgh
- Courage (1921) – Stephan Blackmoore
- A Wife's Awakening (1921) – George Otis
- Robin Hood (1922) – Prince John
- Forsaking All Others (1922) – Dr. Mason
- Slippy McGee (1923) – Father De Rance
- Circus Days (1923) – Lord
- The Spoilers (1923) – Judge Stillman
- A Prince of a King (1923) – Duke Roberto
- The Dancer of the Nile (1923) – Pasheri
- In the Palace of the King (1923) – King Philip II
- Tiger Rose (1923) – Dr. Cusick
- The Courtship of Miles Standish (1923) – John Carver
- Painted People (1924) – Henry Parrish
- Pagan Passions (1924) – Frank Langley
- A Self-Made Failure (1924) – Cyrus Cruikshank
- The Virgin (1924) – Ricardo Ruiz
- On the Threshold (1925) – Daniel Masters
- The Mansion of Aching Hearts (1925) – Martin Craig
- One Year to Live (1925) – Dr. Lucien La Pierre
- Sun-Up (1925) – Sheriff Weeks
- Heir-Loons (1925)
- Sally, Irene and Mary (1925) – Officer O'Dare
- Mike (1926) – Brush
- The Black Pirate (1926) – Pirate Lieutenant
- Her Second Chance (1926) – Beachey
- Broken Hearts of Hollywood (1926) – Defense Attorney
- The Eagle of the Sea (1926) – Col. Lestron
- Love's Blindness (1926) – Benjamin Levy
- When a Man Loves (1927) – Comte Guillot de Morfontaine
- King of Kings (1927) – Pharisee
- Captain Salvation (1927) – Peter Campbell
- The Fighting Eagle (1927) – Talleyrand
- The Country Doctor (1927) – Ira Harding
- The Wreck of the Hesperus (1927) – Capt. David Slocum
- The Man Who Laughs (1928) – King James II
- Honor Bound (1928) – Blood Keller
- The Racket (1928) – District Attorney Welch
- Our Dancing Daughters (1928) – Freddie's Father
- Dog Law (1928) – Minor Role (uncredited)
- The Farmer's Daughter (1928) – (uncredited)
- Silks and Saddles (1929) – William Morrissey
- The Last Performance (1929) – District Attorney
- Wall Street (1929) – John Willard
- Captain of the Guard (1930) – Bazin (final film role)

== See also ==
- Other Canadian pioneers in early Hollywood
