= A White Man's Chance =

1919 silent film

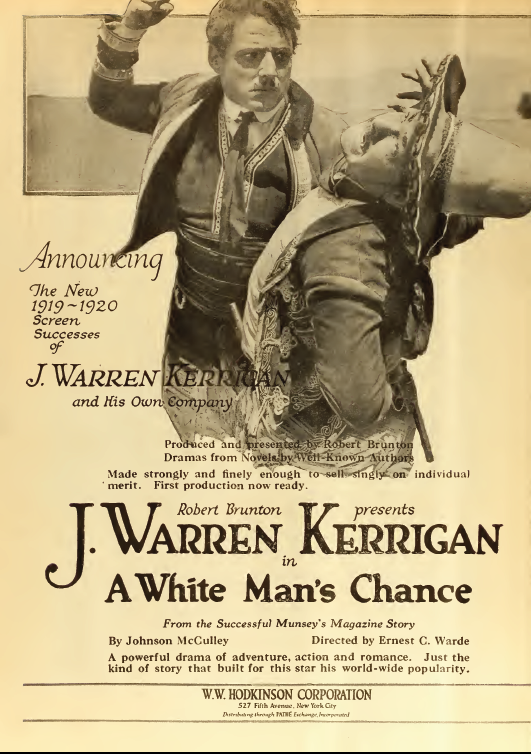
- Directed by: Ernest C. Warde
- Written by: Johnston McCulley (story); Clifford Howard
- Produced by: Robert Brunton
- Starring: J. Warren Kerrigan; Lillian Walker; Joseph J. Dowling
- Cinematography: Charles E. Kaufman
- Production company: Robert Brunton Productions
- Distributed by: Hodkinson Pictures; Pathe Exchange
- Release date: July 1919
- Running time: 50 minutes
- Country: United States
- Languages: Silent; English intertitles

A White Man's Chance is a 1919 American silent adventure film directed by Ernest C. Warde and starring J. Warren Kerrigan, Lillian Walker and Joseph J. Dowling.

== Synopsis ==
A Boston lawyer heads to Mexico for work and soon becomes embroiled in trouble.

== Cast ==
- J. Warren Kerrigan as Donald Joseph Blenhorn
- Lillian Walker as Dorothy Charlton
- Joseph J. Dowling as William Roberts
- Howard Davies as Hugh Hankins
- Andrew Arbuckle as Valentino
- Joseph Hazelton as Pedro
- George Field as Juan Lopez
- Joe Ray as Augustin Gonzalez
- Dick La Reno as The Magistrado

== Bibliography ==
- Goble, Alan. The Complete Index to Literary Sources in Film. Walter de Gruyter, 1999.
