= $30,000 =

1920 film

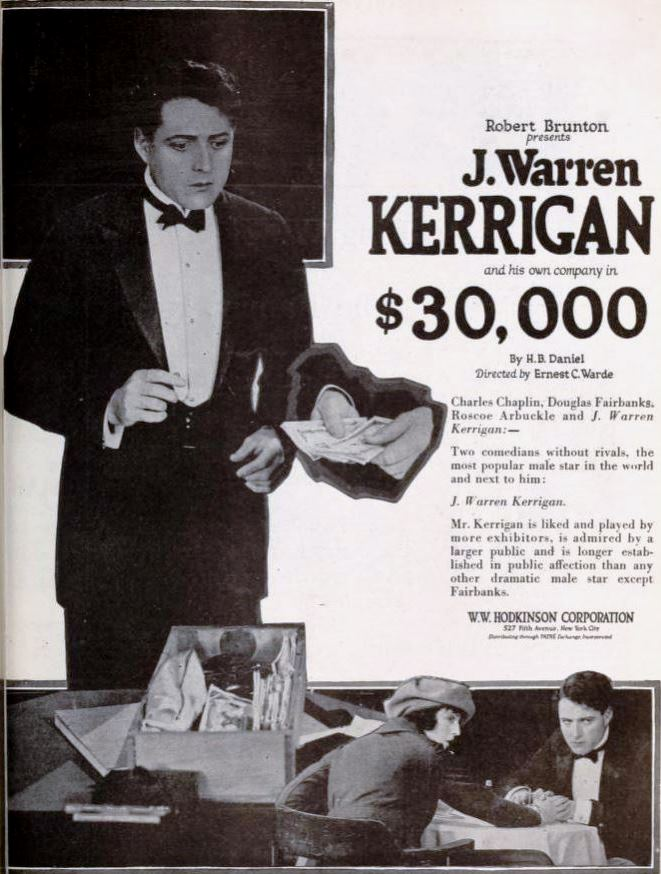
- Directed by: Ernest C. Warde
- Written by: Jack Cunningham; H.B. Daniel
- Starring: J. Warren Kerrigan; Fritzi Brunette; Carl Stockdale
- Cinematography: Arthur L. Todd
- Production company: Robert Brunton Productions
- Distributed by: Hodkinson Pictures; Pathé Exchange
- Release date: February 29, 1920
- Running time: 50 minutes
- Country: United States
- Languages: Silent; English intertitles

$30,000 is a lost 1920 American silent mystery film directed by Ernest C. Warde and starring J. Warren Kerrigan, Fritzi Brunette and Carl Stockdale.

== Plot ==
When Sydney Lloyd pawns a necklace to pay his gambling debts, his sister turns to a struggling attorney, John Trask, who is given $30,000 to purchase the necklace. The necklace belongs to Christine Lloyd's wealthy uncle, and was stolen by Sydney for gambling with. The gambler, Ferdinand Spargo, has a paste copy of the necklace and wants to swap it for the real one, and gain the $30,000. Spargo hires Aline Norton to take the fake necklace to Trask and steal the $30,000, which is hidden behind a picture in Trask's office. Aline's father is the building's janitor and upsets the picture and discovers the money concealed behind it, which he liberates. Trask enters the gamblers hideout to investigate and wins $30,000 at roulette, he gives it to Aline in exchange for the fake necklace, which he quickly finds out about. He raids the gambler's den to obtain the original and returns the necklace and the additional $30,000 to Sydney's uncle. A prologue reveals a sage is prophesying the story to his harem, who push him to show more, and he looks further into the future to depict Trask and Aline's wedding.

== Cast ==
- J. Warren Kerrigan as John Trask
- Fritzi Brunette as Aline Norton
- Carl Stockdale as Ferdinand Spargo
- Nancy Chase as Christine Lloyd
- Joseph J. Dowling as Annester Norton
- Arthur Millett as 'Shadow' Dan
- Frank L. Gereghty as Charley Foster
- Jack Rollens as Sydney Lloyd
- Tom Guise as Mat Lloyd
- Gertrude Valentine as Mrs. Hutchinson

== Reception ==
$30,000 received mixed reviews upon release, with Wid's Daily reporting that it's "fair story material being spoiled by either a bad continuity or lack of application on the part of the director." Variety had kind words to say about the acting but that the inclusion of an "oriental sage" as part of the continuity, "falls flat."

== Preservation ==
With no holdings located in archives, $30,000 is considered a lost film.

== Bibliography ==
- Connelly, Robert B. The Silents: Silent Feature Films, 1910-36, Volume 40, Issue 2. December Press, 1998.
- Wlaschin, Ken. Silent Mystery and Detective Movies: A Comprehensive Filmography. McFarland, 2009.
