= The World Aflame =

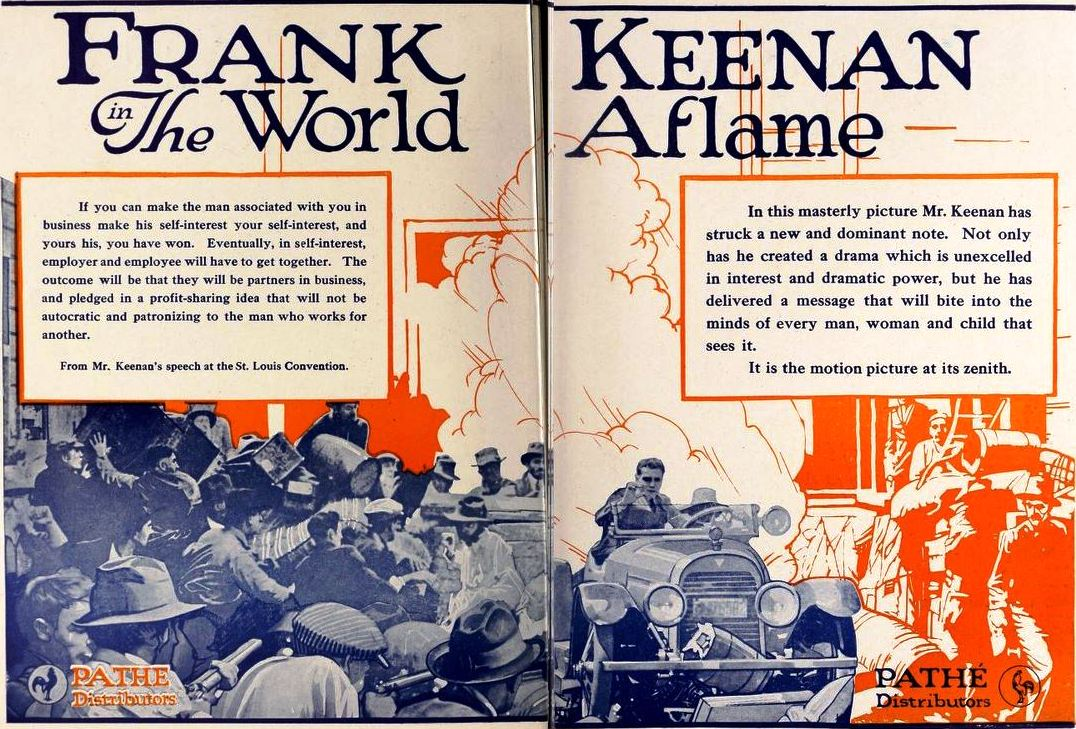
- An advertisement for the film
- Directed by: Ernest C. Warde
- Screenplay by: Jack Cunningham; Frank Keenan
- Story by: Frank Keenan
- Starring: Frank Keenan; Kathleen Kerrigan; Clark Marshall
- Cinematography: Charles Kaufman
- Production company: Frank Keenan Productions
- Distributed by: Pathé Exchange
- Release date: August 17, 1919
- Running time: 6 reels
- Country: United States
- Language: Silent (English intertitles)

The World Aflame is a 1919 drama film directed by Ernest C. Warde. It was distributed by Pathe Exchange.

== Plot ==
Carson Burr (Frank Keenan) is a wealthy business man who recognizing that the city in which he lives will soon need an executive officer capable enough and honest enough to see that justice is done Capital and Labor, the latter influenced by a group of alien anarchists, clash over the question of what the toiler shall be paid for the labor he performs. On a platform promising justice to all he is elected and before- his term of office expires he finds himself con- seen. fronted with the crisis he has fore- Labor in all its organized branches has gone on a strike. Back of the movement is the group of men and women of anarchistic minds, governed Ijy a leader who edits a newspaper preaching the doctrines espoused by I. W. W.'s, Bolsheviki's and the other sects of like brand. The street car lines in the city are tied up. Not a wheel is turning. The superintendent of the road and the mayor run a car through in spite of the mob which threatens them at every turn of a wheel. Two thousand exrtra police guard every industrial plant in the city. The city's returned " Dough Boys " are organized under efficient leadership. In one day the strike is broken, the alien band with its leader are arrested and deported and the business of the city resumes.

== Cast ==
- Frank Keenan as Carson Burr
- Kathleen Kerrigan as Mrs. Burr
- Clark Marshall as Theodore Burr
- Janice Wilson as Roxy Burr
- Bert Sprotte as Nikolai Popoff
- Claire Du Brey as Emma Reich
- Joseph McManus as George Knox

== Reception ==
A contemporary review in The Central New Jersey Home News praised the performances of both Keenan and the supporting cast.
