= Number 99 (film) =

1920 silent film

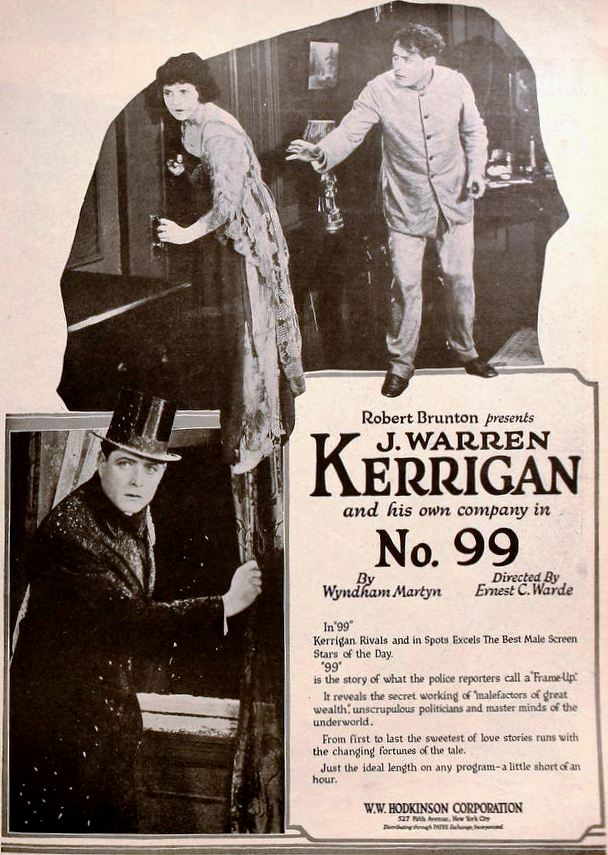
- Directed by: Ernest C. Warde
- Written by: Wyndham Martin (novel); Jack Cunningham
- Produced by: Robert Brunton
- Starring: J. Warren Kerrigan; Fritzi Brunette; Emmett King
- Cinematography: Arthur L. Todd
- Production company: Robert Brunton Productions
- Distributed by: Hodkinson Pictures; Pathe Exchange
- Release date: May 23, 1920
- Running time: 50 minutes
- Country: United States
- Languages: Silent; English intertitles

Number 99 is a silent 1920 American thriller film directed by Ernest C. Warde and starring J. Warren Kerrigan, Fritzi Brunette and Emmett King.

== Plot ==
A man wrongly sent to jail escapes and goes on the run, searching out the real criminal.

== Cast ==
- J. Warren Kerrigan as Arthur Penryn
- Fritzi Brunette as Cynthia Vivian
- Emmett King as Compton Vivian
- Charles Arling as John Brandt
- Kathleen Kirkham as Mrs. Vivian
- John Steppling as Stephen Schuyler
- Lila Leslie as Renee Etherington
- R.D. MacLean as Judge Ellicott
- William V. Mong as Jake Trebs
- Tom Guise as James Valentine

== Bibliography ==
- Goble, Alan. The Complete Index to Literary Sources in Film. Walter de Gruyter, 1999.
- Wlaschin, Ken. Silent Mystery and Detective Movies: A Comprehensive Filmography. McFarland, 2009.
