= Prisoners of the Pines =

1918 silent film

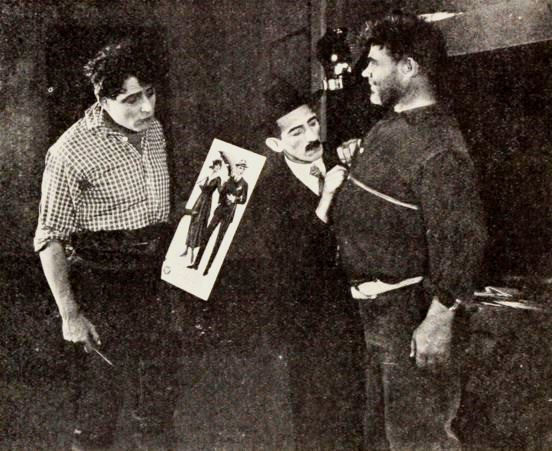
- Directed by: Ernest C. Warde
- Written by: Kenneth B. Clarke
- Produced by: Jesse D. Hampton
- Starring: J. Warren Kerrigan; Lois Wilson; Walter Perry
- Cinematography: John Stumar
- Edited by: Cyril Gardner
- Production company: Jesse D. Hampton Productions
- Distributed by: Hodkinson Pictures
- Release date: September 16, 1918
- Running time: 50 minutes
- Country: United States
- Languages: Silent; English intertitles

Prisoners of the Pines is a 1918 American silent drama film directed by Ernest C. Warde and starring J. Warren Kerrigan, Lois Wilson and Walter Perry.

== Cast ==
- J. Warren Kerrigan as Hillaire Latour
- Lois Wilson as Rosalie Dufresne
- Walter Perry as 'Spud' Lafferty
- Claire Du Brey as Louise

== Preservation ==
The film is now lost.

== Bibliography ==
- Rainey, Buck. Sweethearts of the Sage: Biographies and Filmographies of 258 actresses appearing in Western movies. McFarland & Company, 1992.
