= Arthur L. Todd =

American cinematographer (1895–1942)

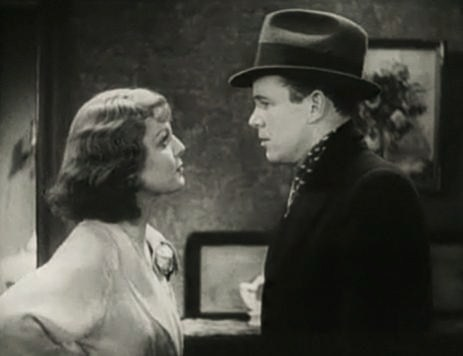
Arthur L. Todd

Arthur L. Todd (February 12, 1895, in New Jersey – August 28, 1942, in Oceanside, New York) was an American cinematographer whose work included Hot Saturday (1932), I've Got Your Number (1934), and You're in the Army Now (1941).

== Partial filmography ==
- Desert Gold (1919)
- The Lord Loves the Irish (1919)
- The Dream Cheater (1920)
- $30,000 (1920)
- The House of Whispers (1920)
- Number 99 (1920)
- The Green Flame (1920)
- The Devil to Pay (1920)
- Live Sparks (1920)
- According to Hoyle (1922)
- The Isle of Lost Ships (1923)
- The Brass Bottle (1923)
- In Every Woman's Life (1924)
- The White Moth (1924)
- Torment (1924)
- Gold Heels (1924)
- One Year to Live (1925)
- Just a Woman (1925)
- What Happened to Jones (1926)
- Take It from Me (1926)
- Skinner's Dress Suit (1926)
- Rolling Home (1926)
- Her Big Night (1926)
- Watch Your Wife (1926)
- Fast and Furious (1927)
- Out All Night (1927)
- The Lone Eagle (1927)
- Hot Heels (1928)
- Golf Widows (1928)
- How to Handle Women (1928)
- One Hysterical Night (1929)
- The Forward Pass (1929)
- Loose Ankles (1930)
- Thus is Life (1930)
- What a Man! (1930)
- Monkey Business (1931)
- Million Dollar Legs (1932)
- Hot Saturday (1932)
- She Had to Say Yes (1933)
- Wild Horse Mesa (1933)
- Elmer, the Great (1933)
- Wild Boys of the Road (1933)
- Ever in My Heart (1933)
- Girl Missing (1933)
- College Coach (1933)
- Harold Teen (1934)
- Return of the Terror (1934)
- Babbitt (1934)
- Big Hearted Herbert (1934)
- I've Got Your Number (1934)
- Miss Pacific Fleet (1935)
- Alibi Ike (1935)
- Red Hot Tires (1935)
- Broadway Hostess (1935)
- Get Rich Quick (short, 1935)
- We're in the Money (1935)
- The Payoff (1935)
- The Florentine Dagger (1935)
- Snowed Under (1936)
- The Murder of Dr. Harrigan (1936)
- Earthworm Tractors (1936)
- Murder by an Aristocrat (1936)
- Down the Stretch (1936)
- Jailbreak (1936)
- Here Comes Carter (1936)
- Boulder Dam (1936)
- Marry the Girl (1937)
- The Singing Marine (1937)
- The Adventurous Blonde (1937)
- Sh! The Octopus (1937)
- Men in Exile (1937)
- Sing Me a Love Song (1937)
- Melody for Two (1937)
- Back in Circulation (1937)
- Her Husband's Secretary (1937)
- Crime School (1938)
- He Couldn't Say No (1938)
- Penrod's Double Trouble (1938)
- Going Places (1938)
- The Amazing Mr. Williams (1939)
- Torchy Plays with Dynamite (1939)
- The Man Who Dared (1939)
- Dead End Kids on Dress Parade (1939)
- Naughty But Nice (1939)
- The Angels Wash Their Faces (1939)
- South of Suez (1940)
- An Angel from Texas (1940)
- A Fugitive from Justice (1940)
- River's End (1940)
- Three Sons o' Guns (1941)
- Badmen of Missouri (1941)
- The Smiling Ghost (1941)
- The Great Mr. Nobody (1941)
- Lady Gangster (1942)
