= W. W. Hodkinson Corporation =

Film distribution corporation

The W. W. Hodkinson Corporation was a film distribution corporation active during the silent era. It was established and run by the pioneer William Wadsworth Hodkinson who had previously been instrumental in the foundation of Paramount Pictures. After being forced out from Paramount in 1916, Hodkinson briefly worked with Triangle Film before setting up his own independent distribution outfit in November 1917, purchasing Triangle's distribution network of film exchanges for $600,000. It distributed more than a hundred films from 1918 until 1924, sometimes through Pathe Exchange.

In 1924 the company was sold to the financier Jeremiah Millbank, who used it as the basis of the newly formed Producers Distributing Corporation.

== Filmography ==
- Madam Who? (1918)
- His Robe of Honor (1918)
- A Man's Man (1918)
- The Turn of a Card (1918)
- Within the Cup (1918)
- Humdrum Brown (1918)
- Blindfolded (1918)
- An Alien Enemy (1918)
- The Embarrassment of Riches (1918)
- With Hoops of Steel (1918)
- Rose o' Paradise (1918)
- Shackled (1918)
- Patriotism (1918)
- One Dollar Bid (1918)
- Maid o' the Storm (1918)
- Wedlock (1918)
- A Burglar for a Night (1918)
- A Law Unto Herself (1918)
- Petticoats and Politics (1918)
- The White Lie (1918)
- Prisoners of the Pines (1918)
- Whatever the Cost (1918)
- The Goddess of Lost Lake (1918)
- The Heart of Rachael (1918)
- Three X Gordon (1918)
- The Law That Divides (1918)
- Two-Gun Betty (1918)
- The Challenge Accepted (1918)
- The Drifters (1919)
- Fighting Through (1919)
- Come Again Smith (1919)
- The Love Hunger (1919)
- The Forfeit (1919)
- The End of the Game (1919)
- Thunderbolts of Fate (1919)
- As a Man Thinks (1919)
- The Best Man (1919)
- Sahara (1919)
- The Blue Bonnet (1919)
- A White Man's Chance (1919)
- The Westerners (1919)
- The Volcano (1919)
- Angel Child (1919)
- You Never Know Your Luck (1919)
- The Bandbox (1919)
- Desert Gold (1919)
- The Lord Loves the Irish (1919)
- The Lone Wolf's Daughter (1919)
- The Capitol (1919)
- The Joyous Liar (1919)
- Live Sparks (1920)
- The Sagebrusher (1920)
- His Temporary Wife (1920)
- The Dream Cheater (1920)
- The Harvest Moon (1920)
- Riders of the Dawn (1920)
- Number 99 (1920)
- Cynthia of the Minute (1920)
- The Green Flame (1920)
- The Silent Barrier (1920)
- Love Madness (1920)
- The Dwelling Place of Light (1920)
- The Kentucky Colonel (1920)
- $30,000 (1920)
- Down Home (1920)
- The House of Whispers (1920)
- The Brute Master (1920)
- The U.P. Trail (1920)
- The Tiger's Coat (1920)
- Pagan Love (1920)
- The Broken Gate (1920)
- The Coast of Opportunity (1920)
- The Spenders (1921)
- The Truant Husband (1921)
- Cameron of the Royal Mounted (1921)
- The Breaking Point (1921)
- Partners of the Tide (1921)
- East Lynne (1921)
- A Certain Rich Man (1921)
- The Other Woman (1921)
- Keeping Up with Lizzie (1921)
- Lavender and Old Lace (1921)
- Man of the Forest (1921)
- The Journey's End (1921)
- The Face of the World (1921)
- Rip Van Winkle (1921)
- The Mysterious Rider (1921)
- Jane Eyre (1921)
- The Light in the Clearing (1921)
- Fifty Candles (1921)
- At the Sign of the Jack O'Lantern (1922)
- French Heels (1922)
- The Gray Dawn (1922)
- Other Women's Clothes (1922)
- Free Air (1922)
- No Trespassing (1922)
- Heart's Haven (1922)
- Slim Shoulders (1922)
- The Veiled Woman (1922)
- Married People (1922)
- Affinities (1922)
- The Rapids (1922)
- The Headless Horseman (1922)
- Down to the Sea in Ships (1922)
- Shifting Sands (1922)
- The Man from Glengarry (1922)
- The Kingdom Within (1922)
- Radio-Mania (1922)
- Second Fiddle (1923)
- While Paris Sleeps (1923)
- Glengarry School Days (1923)
- Dollar Devils (1923)
- Just Like a Woman (1923)
- Youthful Cheaters (1923)
- Michael O'Halloran (1923)
- Mark of the Beast (1923)
- Puritan Passions (1923)
- The Drivin' Fool (1923)
- The Old Fool (1923)
- The Hoosier Schoolmaster (1924)
- The Night Hawk (1924)
- Love's Whirlpool (1924)
- His Darker Self (1924)
- Grit (1924)
- Which Shall It Be? (1924)
- Wandering Husbands (1924)
- Miami (1924)
- What Shall I Do? (1924)
- The Lightning Rider (1924)
- Another Scandal (1924)
- Tiger Thompson (1924)

== Bibliography ==
- Lombardi, Frederic. Allan Dwan and the Rise and Decline of the Hollywood Studios. McFarland, 2013. ISBN 978-0-7864-3485-5.
- Slide, Anthony. The New Historical Dictionary of the American Film Industry. Routledge, 2014.
- Ward, Richard Lewis. When the Cock Crows: A History of the Pathé Exchange. SIU Press, 2016.
