= The Green Flame =

1920 silent film

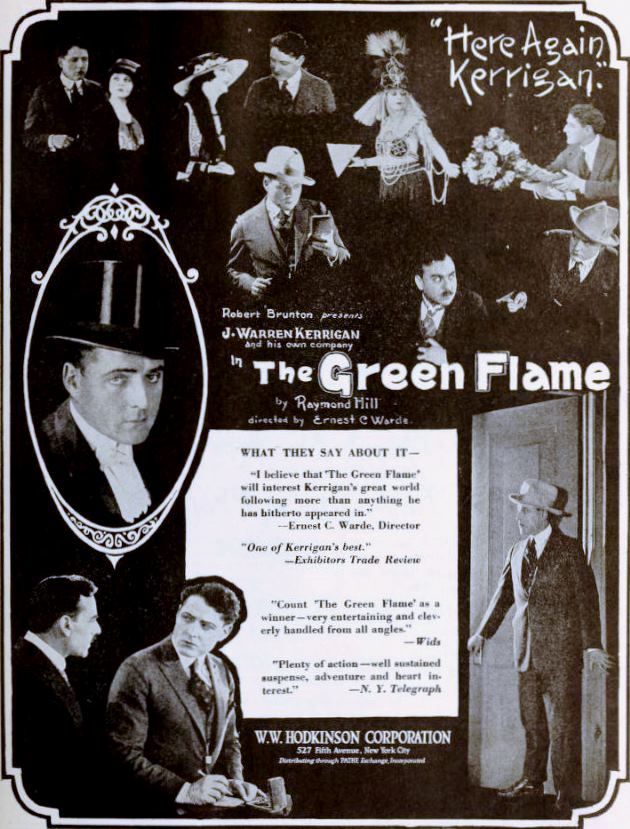
- Directed by: Ernest C. Warde
- Written by: Jack Cunningham; Raymond C. Hill
- Starring: J. Warren Kerrigan; Fritzi Brunette; Jay Morley
- Cinematography: Arthur L. Todd
- Production company: Robert Brunton Productions
- Distributed by: Hodkinson Pictures; Pathe Exchange
- Release date: July 18, 1920
- Running time: 50 minutes
- Country: United States
- Languages: Silent; English intertitles

The Green Flame is a 1920 American silent crime drama film directed by Ernest C. Warde and starring J. Warren Kerrigan, Fritzi Brunette and Jay Morley.

== Cast ==
- J. Warren Kerrigan as Frank Markham
- Fritzi Brunette as Ruth Gardner
- Jay Morley as Dan Lantry
- Claire Du Brey as Lou Tremaine
- Miles McCarthy as Truman Hardy
- Edwin Wallock as Roger Lulay
- William F. Moran as Julius Block

== Preservation ==
With no holdings located in archives, The Green Flame is considered a lost film.

== Bibliography ==
- Munden, Kenneth White. The American Film Institute Catalog of Motion Pictures Produced in the United States, Part 1. University of California Press, 1997.
