= Blindfolded (film) =

1918 silent film by Raymond B. West

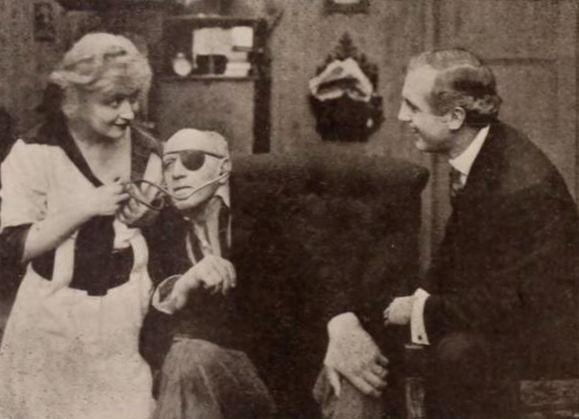
- Bessie Barriscale, Joseph J. Dowling, and an unknown actor
- Directed by: Raymond B. West
- Written by: Richard Schayer
- Starring: Bessie Barriscale
- Cinematography: Clyde De Vinna
- Production company: Paralta Plays
- Distributed by: W. W. Hodkinson Corporation
- Release date: April 15, 1918
- Running time: 5 reels
- Country: United States
- Language: Silent (English intertitles)

Blindfolded is a 1918 American silent crime drama film directed by Raymond B. West and starring Bessie Barriscale.

== Cast ==
- Bessie Barriscale as Peggy Muldoon
- Joseph J. Dowling as Patrick 'The Ear' Muldoon
- Patrick Calhoun as Izzy
- David Kirby as Sparks McDonnell
- Jay Morley as Soupy Drane
- Edward Coxen as Robert Benton
- Helen Dunbar as Mrs. Benton
- Harry O'Connor as Quinlan

== Preservation ==
With no prints of Blindfolded located in any film archives, it is considered a lost film.
