= Roy Laidlaw (actor) =

Canadian actor

- Born: March 25, 1883; Comber, Ontario, Canada
- Died: February 2, 1936 (aged 52); Hollywood, California, U.S.
- Occupation: Actor
- Years active: 1913–1928 (film)

Roy Laidlaw (1883–1936) was a Canadian film actor of the silent era.

== Selected filmography ==
- The Darkening Trail (1915)
- Bullets and Brown Eyes (1916)
- The Patriot (1916)
- The Vagabond Prince (1916)
- Sweetheart of the Doomed (1917)
- The Gunfighter (1917)
- With Hoops of Steel (1918)
- An Alien Enemy (1918)
- His Robe of Honor (1918)
- A Law Unto Herself (1918)
- Honor's Cross (1918)
- Shackled (1918)
- The Turn of a Card (1918)
- Back to God's Country (1919)
- Are You Legally Married? (1919)
- The Great Accident (1920)
- Cupid the Cowpuncher (1920)
- The Deadlier Sex (1920)
- Live Sparks (1920)
- The Ace of Hearts (1921)
- The Poverty of Riches (1921)
- Fools and Riches (1923)
- The Hunchback of Notre Dame (1923)
- The Gaiety Girl (1924)
- The Snob (1294)
- Where Romance Rides (1925)
- The Splendid Road (1925)
- The Ridin' Streak (1925)
- The White Desert (1925)
- Never Too Late (1925)
- The Right Man (1925)
- When the Door Opened (1925)
- The Devil's Gulch (1926)
- Bred in Old Kentucky (1926)
- Is That Nice? (1926)
- Beyond the Rockies (1926)
- Cactus Trails (1927)
- God's Great Wilderness (1927)
- Not for Publication (1927)
- The Wild West Show (1928)

== Bibliography ==
- Katchmer, George A. A Biographical Dictionary of Silent Film Western Actors and Actresses. McFarland, 2015.
- Solomon, Aubrey. The Fox Film Corporation, 1915-1935: A History and Filmography. McFarland, 2011.
