= Miles McCarthy (actor) =

Canadian actor

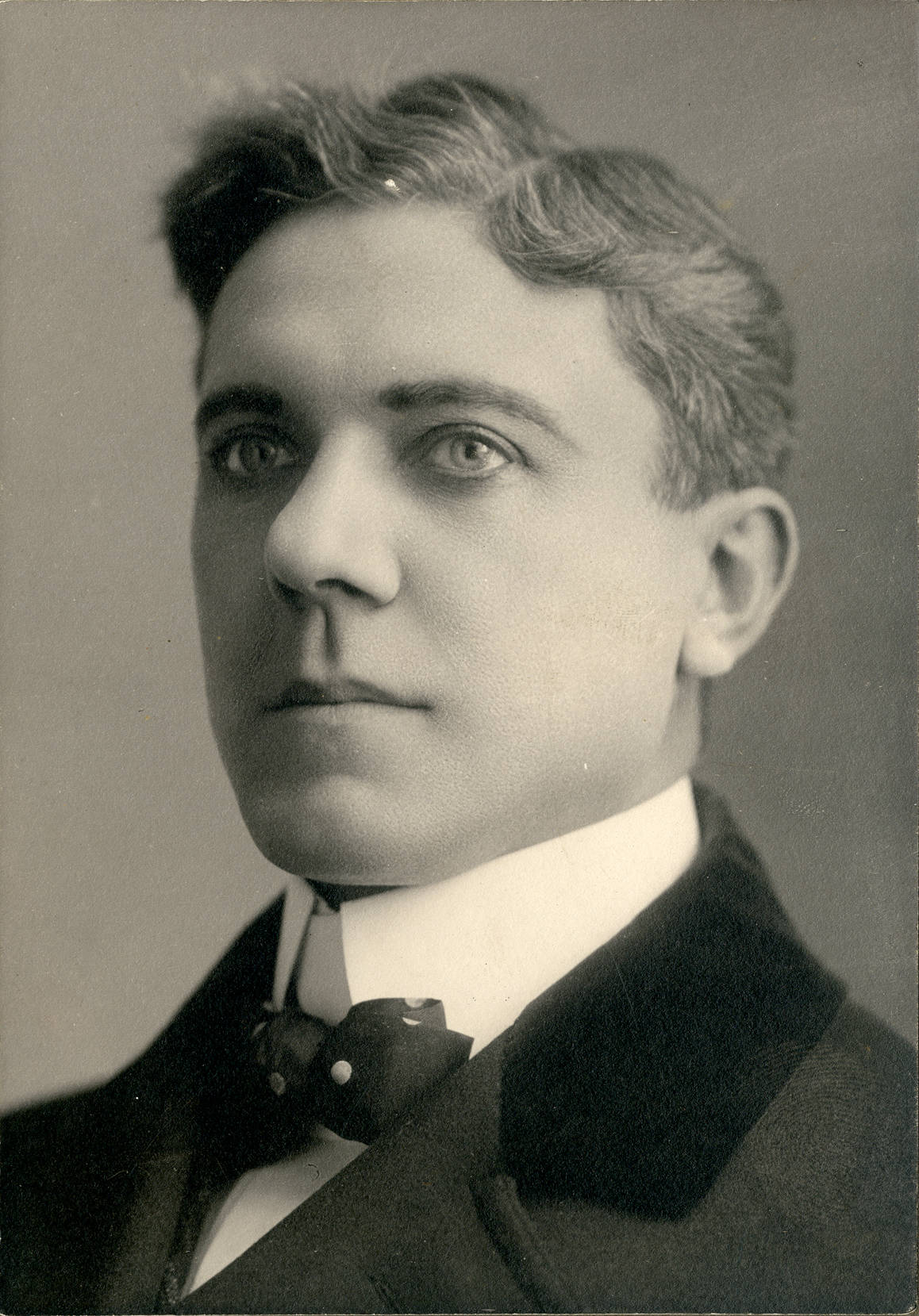
- Born: April 27, 1874; Old Toronto, Ontario, Canada
- Died: September 27, 1928 (aged 54); Hollywood, California, U.S.
- Occupation: Actor
- Years active: 1911–1927 (film)

Miles McCarthy (1874–1928) was a Canadian stage actor who went on to appear in a number of silent films. He is sometimes credited as Myles McCarthy.

== Selected filmography ==
- Fear Not (1917)
- The Silence Sellers (1917)
- The False Code (1919)
- A Man's Fight (1919)
- The Green Flame (1920)
- The Tiger's Coat (1920)
- The House of Whispers (1920)
- Smiles Are Trumps (1922)
- Dollar Devils (1923)
- The Day of Faith (1923)
- Abraham Lincoln (1924)
- The Night Hawk (1924)
- Oh, You Tony! (1924)
- Captain Blood (1924)
- The Lady (1925)
- Tricks (1925)
- The Heart of a Coward (1926)
- The Racing Fool (1927)

== Bibliography ==
- Slide, Anthony. Ravished Armenia and the Story of Aurora Mardiganian. Univ. Press of Mississippi, 2014.
- Solomon, Aubrey. The Fox Film Corporation, 1915-1935: A History and Filmography. McFarland, 2011.
- Wlaschin, Ken. Silent Mystery and Detective Movies: A Comprehensive Filmography. McFarland, 2009.
