= Honor Bound (1928 film) =

1928 film

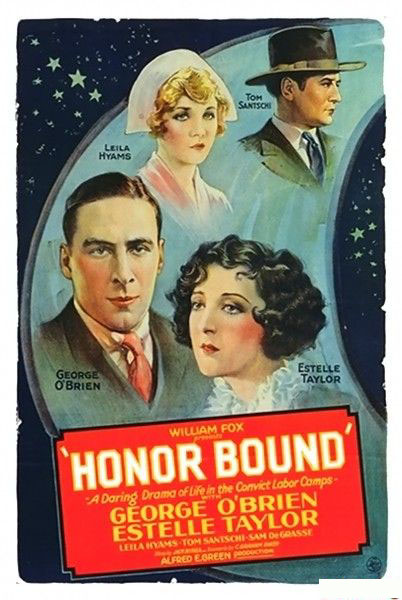
- Directed by: Alfred E. Green
- Written by: Jack Bethea; C. Graham Baker; Philip Klein; William Kernell
- Produced by: Alfred E. Green
- Starring: George O'Brien; Estelle Taylor; Leila Hyams
- Cinematography: Joseph H. August
- Edited by: J. Edwin Robbins
- Production company: Fox Film
- Distributed by: Fox Film
- Release date: April 29, 1928
- Running time: 70 minutes
- Country: United States
- Languages: Silent; English intertitles

Honor Bound is a 1928 American silent drama film directed by Alfred E. Green and starring George O'Brien, Estelle Taylor and Leila Hyams.

== Plot ==
Evelyn Mortimer (Estelle Taylor) accidentally kills her husband. A self-sacrificing youth John Ogletree (George O'Brien) takes the blame for the crime and goes to prison. Evelyn marries mineowner Mr. Mortimer (Tom Santschi) and gets Ogletree, who is imprisoned nearby, to be her chauffeur. Mr. Mortimer discovers their affair, mistreats Ogletree, and sends him into the mines.

== Cast ==
- George O'Brien as John Oglegree
- Estelle Taylor as Evelyn Mortimer
- Leila Hyams as Selma Ritchie
- Tom Santschi as Mr. Mortimer
- Frank Cooley as Dr. Ritchie
- Sam De Grasse as Blood Keller
- Al Hart as Cid Ames
- Harry Gripp as Skip Collier
- George Irving as State Governor

== Bibliography ==
- Solomon, Aubrey. The Fox Film Corporation, 1915-1935: A History and Filmography. McFarland, 2011.
