= The False Code =

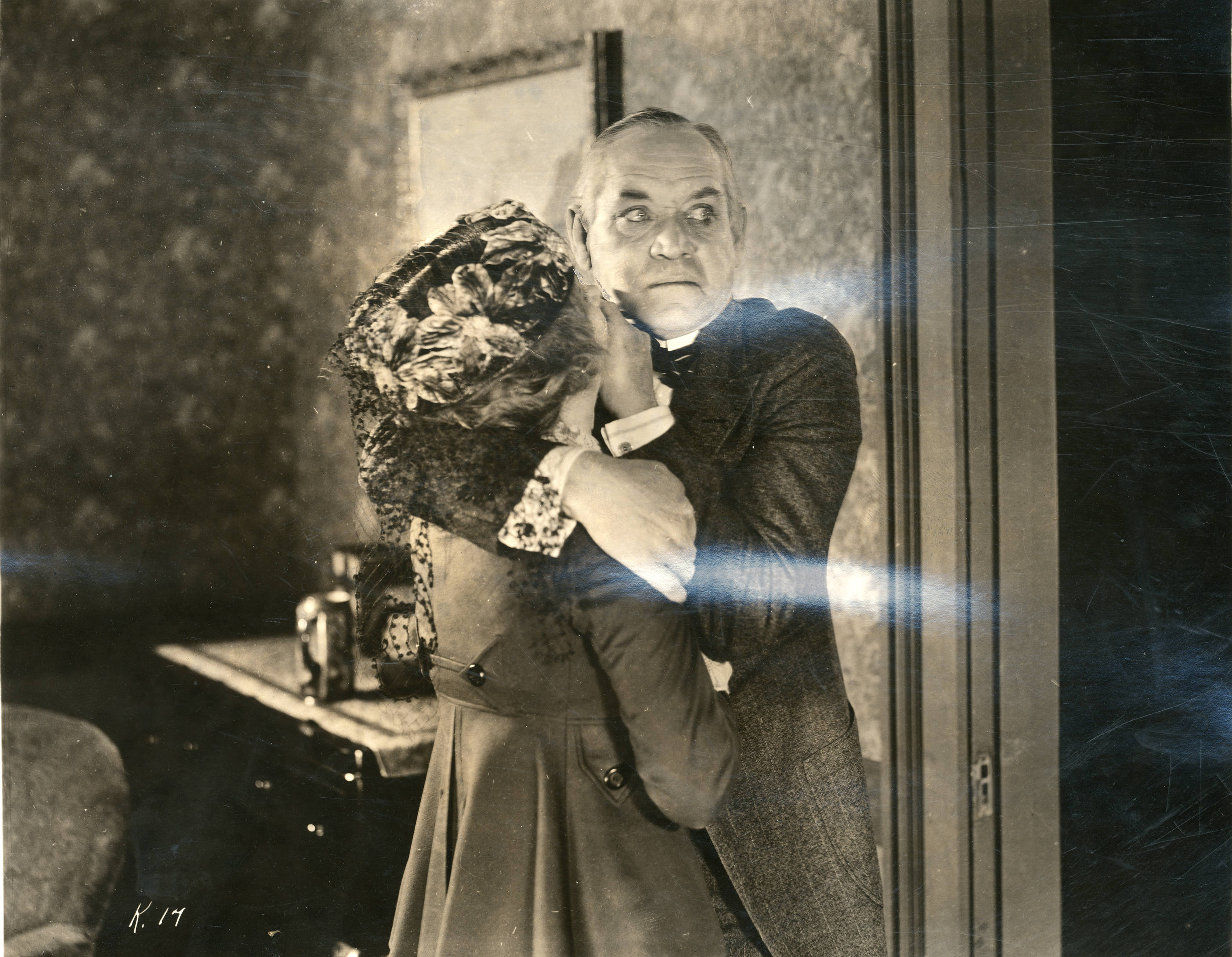
- Still with Frank Keenan
- Directed by: Ernest C. Warde
- Written by: Jack Cunningham
- Based on: Kate Corbaley's story
- Produced by: Frank Keenan
- Starring: Frank Keenan
- Cinematography: Charles E. Kaufman
- Distributed by: Pathé Exchange
- Release date: September 21, 1919
- Running time: 5 reels
- Country: United States
- Language: Silent (English intertitles)

The False Code is a lost 1919 American silent drama film directed by Ernest C. Warde and produced by and starring Frank Keenan. It was distributed by Pathé Exchange.

== Cast ==
- Frank Keenan as John Benton
- Miles McCarthy as Henry Vance
- Joseph J. Dowling as Daniel Grey
- Clyde Benson as Oscar Curtin
- Ed Brady as Chicago Ed (*Edward J. Brady)
- T. D. Crittenden as District Attorney
- Helene Sullivan as Mrs. Benton
- Irene Yeager as- Anne Benton
- Jean Calhoun as Anne Benton
- Pell Trenton as Jim Grey

== Preservation status ==
The film is lost with a fragment surviving at the BFI National Film and Television Archive.
