= It Happened Thus =

- Starring: Charlotte Burton; Owen Moore; Fritzi Brunette
- Distributed by: Universal Film Manufacturing Company
- Release date: November 12, 1912
- Country: United States
- Languages: Silent film English intertitles

It Happened Thus is a 1912 American silent short romantic drama film, starring Charlotte Burton and Owen Moore.

== Cast ==
- Charlotte Burton, as the older daughter
- Fritzi Brunette, as the younger daughter
- Owen Moore
