= Fear Not (film) =

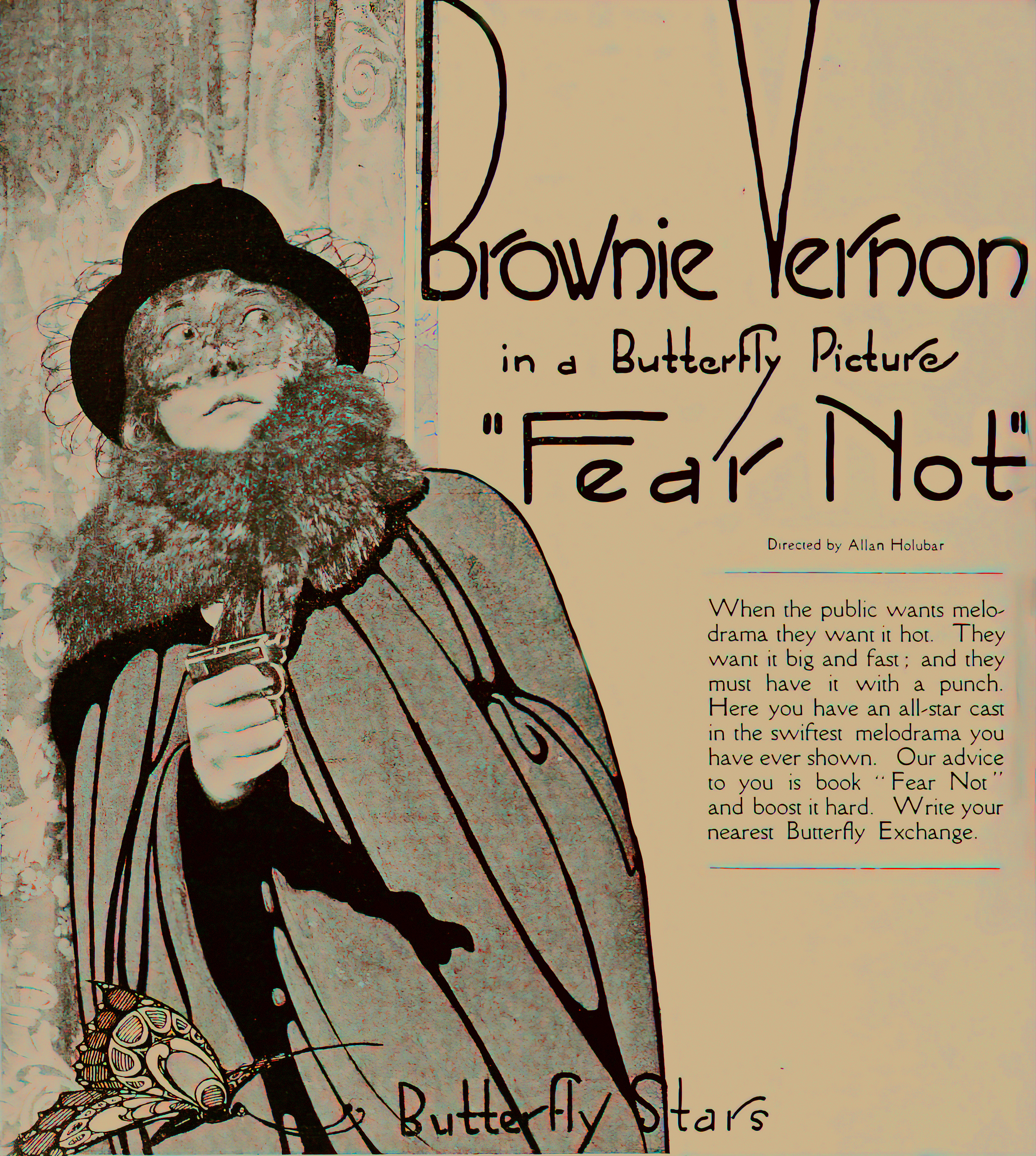
- Motion Picture News Movie ad 1917
- Directed by: Allen Holubar
- Written by: J. Grubb Alexander; Fred Myton
- Starring: Agnes Vernon; Miles McCarthy; Murdock MacQuarrie
- Cinematography: Al Cawood; Duke Hayward
- Production company: Universal Pictures
- Distributed by: Universal Pictures
- Release date: November 26, 1917
- Running time: 50 minutes
- Country: United States
- Languages: Silent; English intertitles

Fear Not is a 1917 American silent crime drama film directed by Allen Holubar and starring Agnes Vernon, Miles McCarthy and Murdock MacQuarrie.

== Cast ==
- Agnes Vernon as Hilda Mornington
- Miles McCarthy as James Mornington
- Murdock MacQuarrie as Allen Mornington
- Joseph W. Girard as Mortimer Gildane
- Frank Borzage as Franklin Shirley

== Bibliography ==
- Robert B. Connelly. The Silents: Silent Feature Films, 1910-36, Volume 40, Issue 2. December Press, 1998.
