= The Night Hawk (1924 film) =

1924 film

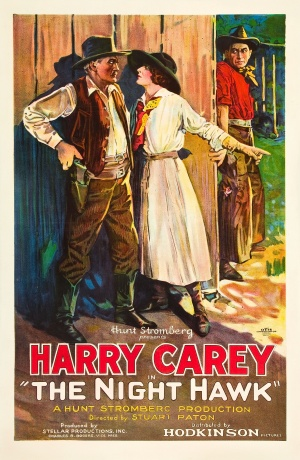
- Theatrical release poster
- Directed by: Stuart Paton
- Written by: Joseph F. Poland; Carlysle Graham Raht
- Produced by: Hunt Stromberg
- Starring: Harry Carey
- Distributed by: W. W. Hodkinson Corporation
- Release date: February 17, 1924
- Running time: 5150 feet
- Country: United States
- Language: Silent (English intertitles)

The Night Hawk is a 1924 American silent Western film directed by Stuart Paton and featuring Harry Carey.

== Plot ==
As described in a film magazine review, Panther Gann, wanted by the city police, escapes with the aid of José Valdez. He goes West with José. Gann agrees to kill Sheriff Hilton, José's enemy, and catches and tames a wild horse which he names El Sang'rito. Gann falls in love with Clia, Hilton's daughter, and spares her father. After many adventures, he rescues Clia from abductors with the help of his horse, and successfully defends her father from a gang of gunmen. Gann wins the affections of Clia and she agrees to become his wife.

== Cast ==
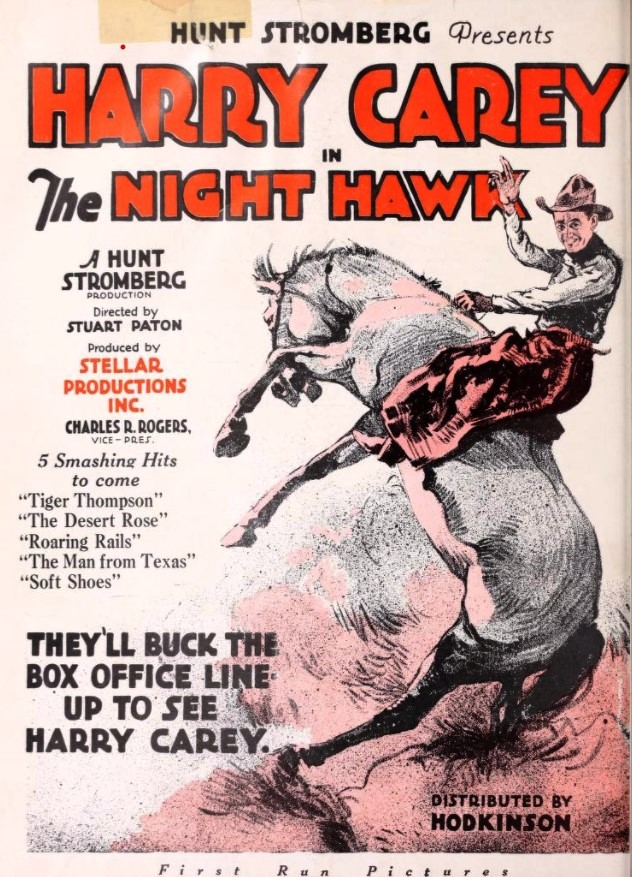
Advertisement for The Night Hawk

- Harry Carey as "Panther" Gann / "The Hawk"
- Claire Adams as Clia Milton
- Joseph W. Girard as Sheriff Milton (credited as Joseph Girard)
- Fred Malatesta as José Valdez
- Nick De Ruiz as Manuel Valdez (credited as Nicholas De Ruiz)
- Lee Shumway
- Oleda Parrish
- William Elmer
- Miles McCarthy
- Fred Kelsey
- Douglas Carter

== Preservation ==
With no prints of The Night Hawk located in any film archives, it is a lost film.
