= Tony Kornman =

American cinematographer

Anthony Kornman (1887 – 17 December 1942) was an American cinematographer, who worked on three films: Cameron of the Royal Mounted (1921), The Hunchback of Notre Dame (1923) and The Ridin' Streak (1929). He was considered a specialist in special effects.
