= The Coast of Opportunity =

1920 silent film

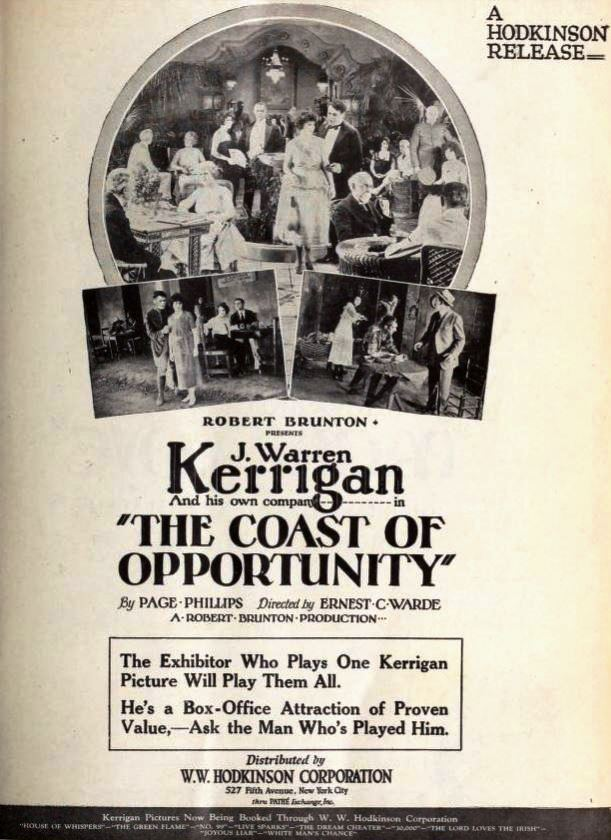
- Directed by: Ernest C. Warde
- Written by: Page Phillips; Frederick Stowers
- Produced by: Robert Brunton
- Starring: J. Warren Kerrigan; Herschel Mayall; Fritzi Brunette
- Production company: Robert Brunton Productions
- Distributed by: Hodkinson Pictures
- Release date: December 1920
- Running time: 50 minutes
- Country: United States
- Languages: Silent; English intertitles

The Coast of Opportunity is a 1920 American silent Western drama film directed by Ernest C. Warde and starring J. Warren Kerrigan, Herschel Mayall and Fritzi Brunette.

== Cast ==
- J. Warren Kerrigan as Dick Bristow
- Herschel Mayall as Julien Marr
- Fritzi Brunette as Janet Ashley
- Edward Hearn as Tommy De Boer
- Flora Hollister as Rosita
- Carl Stockdale as Marr's Private Secretary
- William V. Mong as An Old Miner

== Preservation ==
With no holdings located in archives, The Coast of Opportunity is considered a lost film.

== Bibliography ==
- Munden, Kenneth White. The American Film Institute Catalog of Motion Pictures Produced in the United States, Part 1. University of California Press, 1997.
