= The Skinflint =

- Directed by: Jack Harvey
- Starring: Ernest C. Warde; David Thompson; Carey L. Hastings
- Production company: Thanhouser Company
- Distributed by: Mutual Film
- Release date: March 26, 1915
- Running time: 1 reel
- Country: USA
- Language: Silent (English intertitles)

The Skinflint is a 1915 American short silent drama film, directed by Jack Harvey for the Thanhouser Company. It stars Ernest C. Warde, David Thompson, Carey L. Hastings.

== Plot ==
According to a film magazine, "The 'skinflint' refuses to help his son when he gets into a tight place, and he turns away his daughter when she comes to him telling about her sick husband and needy children. But there's many a man leading just such a crabbed, dehumanized life, who, like Silas Keene, would change his habits if only through some pin-hole of a crevice in his hardened character, a bit of sunshine might pierce its way into his soul. Silas sees himself, in a kind of dream, as the man he might have been. He decides that the vision isn't too good to come true. So he goes to the rescue of his son and his daughter and her family, and then he buys a big, homey house and surrounds himself therein with his kith and kin, and lives out the rest of his days a happy, human, grandfatherly old man."

== Cast ==
- Ernest C. Warde as Silas Keene, the "Skinflint"
- David Thompson as His Son
- Carey L. Hastings as His Daughter
- Virginia Waite
