= The House of Whispers =

1920 silent film directed by Ernest C. Warde

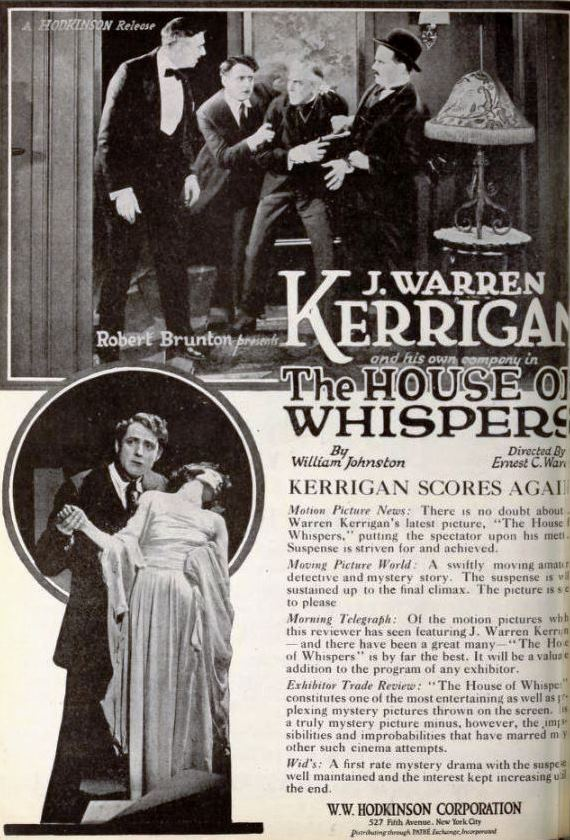
- Directed by: Ernest C. Warde
- Written by: William Andrew Johnston (novel); Jack Cunningham
- Produced by: Robert Brunton
- Starring: J. Warren Kerrigan; Joseph J. Dowling; Fritzi Brunette
- Cinematography: Arthur L. Todd
- Production company: Robert Brunton Productions
- Distributed by: Pathé Exchange; W. W. Hodkinson Corporation
- Release date: October 1920
- Running time: 60 minutes
- Country: United States
- Languages: Silent; English intertitles

The House of Whispers is a lost 1920 American silent mystery film directed by Ernest C. Warde and starring J. Warren Kerrigan, Joseph J. Dowling and Fritzi Brunette.

== Plot ==
Spaulding Nelson moves into an apartment after his uncle has been driven from it by the sounds of screams and whispers. Upon undertaking an investigation, he meets neighbor Barbara Bradford, whose sister Clara is being tormented by the recurring sounds of her dead husband Roldo’s voice.

== Cast ==
- J. Warren Kerrigan as Spaulding Nelson
- Joseph J. Dowling as Rufus Gaston
- Fritzi Brunette as Barbara Bradford
- Margery Wilson as Clara Bradford
- Myrtle Rishell as Mrs. Bradford
- Herbert Prior as Edward Thayer
- Miles McCarthy as Henry Kent
- Claire Du Brey as Nettie Kelly
- Fred C. Jones as Roldo

== Bibliography ==
- Goble, Alan. The Complete Index to Literary Sources in Film. Walter de Gruyter, 1999.
