= A Burglar for a Night =

1918 silent film

- Directed by: Ernest C. Warde
- Written by: Jack Cunningham; F. McGrew Willis
- Starring: J. Warren Kerrigan; Lois Wilson; William Elmer
- Cinematography: John Stumar
- Production company: Paralta Plays
- Distributed by: Hodkinson Pictures
- Release date: August 4, 1918
- Running time: 50 minutes
- Country: United States
- Languages: Silent; English intertitles

A Burglar for a Night is a 1918 American silent comedy film directed by Ernest C. Warde and starring J. Warren Kerrigan, Lois Wilson and William Elmer.

== Cast ==
- J. Warren Kerrigan as Kirk Marden
- Lois Wilson as Janet Leslie
- William Elmer as William Neal
- Herbert Prior as Wilbur Clayton
- Robert Brower as Daniel Marden
- Charles K. French as James Herrick
- Lydia Yeamans Titus as Maggia, the Maid
- Arma Roma as Ruby Fallon

== Preservation ==
The film is now lost.

== Bibliography ==
- Rainey, Buck. Sweethearts of the Sage: Biographies and Filmographies of 258 actresses appearing in Western movies. McFarland & Company, 1992.
