= A Wife's Awakening =

1921 film

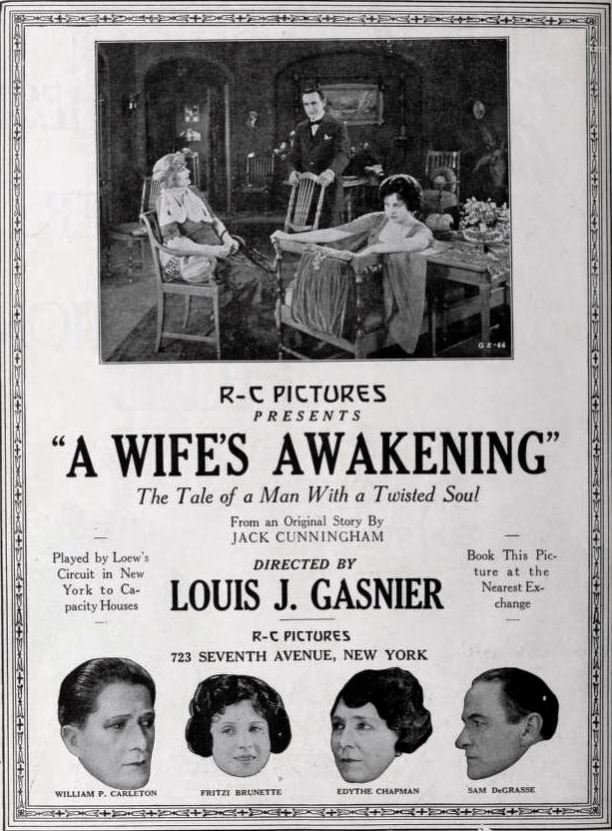
- Directed by: Louis J. Gasnier
- Written by: Jack Cunningham; Joseph A. Dubray
- Starring: William P. Carleton; Fritzi Brunette; Sam De Grasse
- Cinematography: Joseph A. Dubray
- Production company: Robertson-Cole Pictures Corporation
- Distributed by: Robertson-Cole Pictures Corporation
- Release date: September 25, 1921
- Running time: 60 minutes
- Country: United States
- Languages: Silent; English intertitles

A Wife's Awakening is a 1921 American silent drama film directed by Louis J. Gasnier and starring William P. Carleton, Fritzi Brunette and Sam De Grasse.

== Cast ==
- William P. Carleton as John Howard
- Fritzi Brunette as Florence Otis
- Sam De Grasse as George Otis
- Beverly Travers as Grace
- Edythe Chapman as Mrs. Kelcey

== Bibliography ==
- Munden, Kenneth White. The American Film Institute Catalog of Motion Pictures Produced in the United States, Part 1. University of California Press, 1997.
