= Dollar Devils =

1923 film directed by Victor Schertzinger

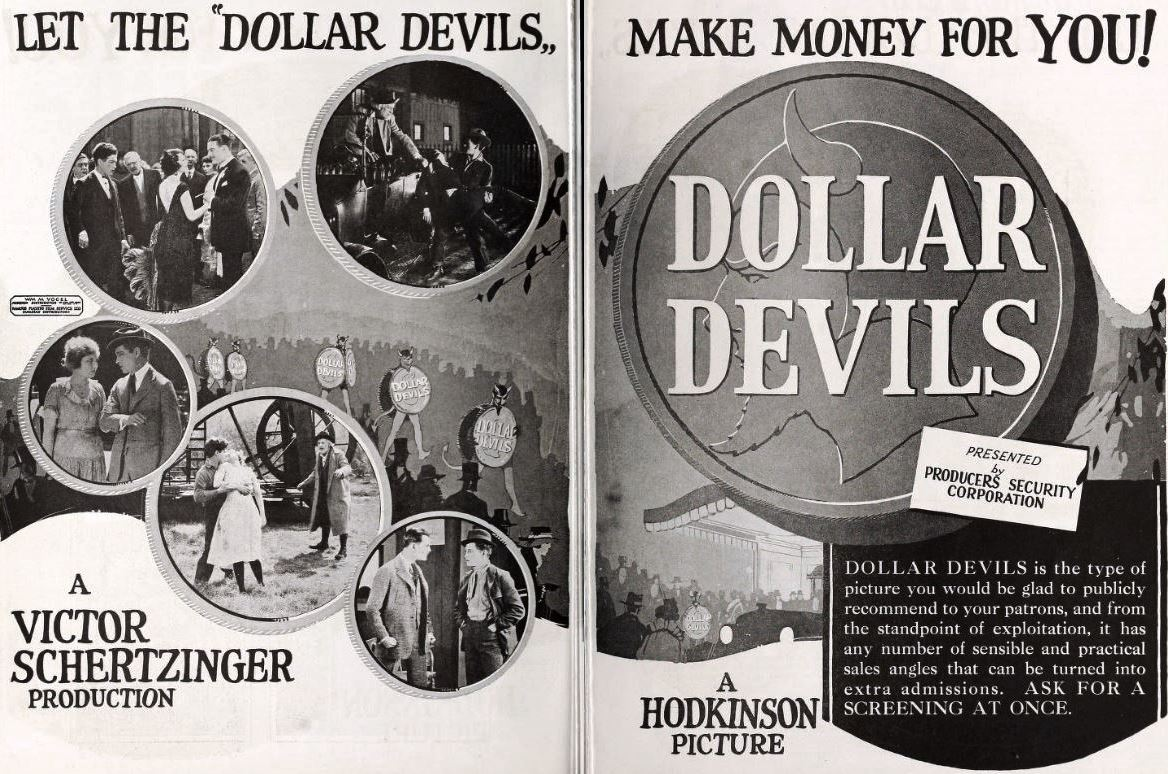
- Trade advertisement
- Directed by: Victor Schertzinger
- Written by: Louis Stevens
- Produced by: Victor Schertzinger
- Starring: Joseph J. Dowling; Miles McCarthy; May Wallace
- Cinematography: John Stumar
- Production company: Victor Schertzinger Productions
- Distributed by: W. W. Hodkinson Corporation
- Release date: January 28, 1923
- Running time: 6 reels
- Country: United States
- Language: Silent (English intertitles)

Dollar Devils is a 1923 American silent drama film directed by Victor Schertzinger and starring Joseph J. Dowling, Miles McCarthy, and May Wallace. Oil is discovered outside a small New England town.

== Plot ==
As described in a film magazine, Xannon Carthy (Dowling) is the leading spirit of Hemling, a small town where life is lived and enjoyed by a lot of people who know nothing and care less of "progress" in the big cities. But Heming gets its taste of industry and hustle when adventurer Bruce Merlin (Cooley) comes into town and starts an oil company. Bruce is a great favorite of Helen Andrews (Farrell), daughter of the town's banker, and therefore he receives sufficient financial backing. The contract for digging the well is awarded to Jim Biggers (Landis), who loves Helen but is now looked down by her as a "small town lout." Bruce of course plans a getaway with the money, but Jim interferes and saves the situation. The discovery of oil makes Hemling hum with activity, but all this passes, to the great delight of Xannon, when the wells quit spouting. As a result of a gentle push by the observant Xannon, Jim finds love in the arms of Helen's sister Amy (Novak).

== Cast ==
- Joseph J. Dowling as Xannon Carthy
- Miles McCarthy as Hal Andrews
- May Wallace as Mrs. Andrews
- Eva Novak as Amy
- Hallam Cooley as Bruce Merlin
- Cullen Landis as Jim Biggers
- Lydia Knott as Mrs. Biggers
- Neyneen Farrell as Helen Andrews

== Preservation ==
With no prints of Dollar Devils located in any film archives, it is a lost film.

== Bibliography ==
- Munden, Kenneth White. The American Film Institute Catalog of Motion Pictures Produced in the United States, Part 1. University of California Press, 1997.
