= Three X Gordon =

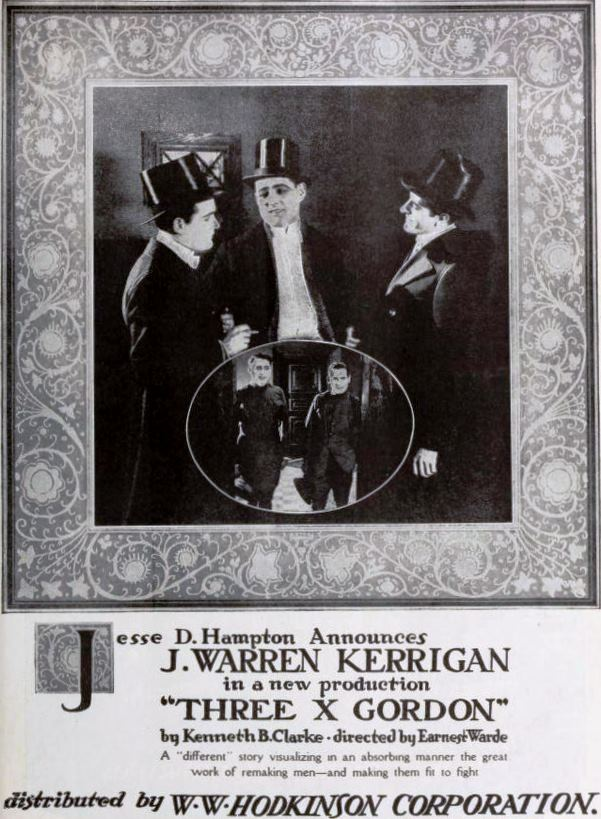
- Directed by: Ernest C. Warde
- Written by: Kenneth B. Clarke
- Produced by: Jesse D. Hampton
- Starring: J. Warren Kerrigan; Lois Wilson; Charles K. French
- Cinematography: Charles J. Stumar
- Production company: Jesse D. Hampton Productions
- Distributed by: W. W. Hodkinson Corporation
- Release date: October 28, 1918
- Running time: 50 minutes
- Country: United States
- Languages: Silent; English intertitles

Three X Gordon is a lost 1918 American silent comedy drama film directed by Ernest C. Warde and starring J. Warren Kerrigan, Lois Wilson and Charles K. French.

== Cast ==
- J. Warren Kerrigan as Harold Chester Winthrop Gordon
- Lois Wilson as Dorrie Webster
- Charles K. French as Jim Gordon
- Gordon Sackville as Mr. Webster
- John Gilbert as Archie
- Jay Belasco as Walter
- Leatrice Joy as Farmer's Daughter
- Walter Perry as Farmer Muldoon
- Don Bailey as Josiah Higgins
- Stanhope Wheatcroft as Thomas Jefferson Higgins

== Production ==
Filming started in August 1918 at the former Willis-Inglis Studio in Hollywood until late September the same year.

== Preservation ==
With no prints of Three X Gordon located in any film archives, it is considered a lost film.

== Bibliography ==
- Golden, Eve. John Gilbert: The Last of the Silent Film Stars. University Press of Kentucky, 2013.
