= A Law Unto Herself =

1918 film

- Directed by: Wallace Worsley
- Written by: Jack Cunningham; Francis Paget
- Produced by: Robert Brunton
- Starring: Louise Glaum; Sam De Grasse; Joseph J. Dowling
- Cinematography: L. Guy Wilky
- Production company: Paralta Plays
- Distributed by: Hodkinson Pictures
- Release date: August 19, 1918
- Running time: 50 minutes
- Country: United States
- Languages: Silent; English intertitles

A Law Unto Herself is a 1918 American silent drama film directed by Wallace Worsley and starring Louise Glaum, Sam De Grasse and Joseph J. Dowling.

== Cast ==
- Louise Glaum as Alouette DeLarme
- Sam De Grasse as Kurt Von Klassner
- Joseph J. Dowling as LeSieur Juste DeLarme
- Edward Coxen as Bertrand Beaubien
- Irene Rich as Stephanie
- Elvira Weil as Fleurette D'Hermonville
- Roy Laidlaw as Fritz Von Klassner
- Burwell Hamrick as Bertrand Von Klassner at age 10
- George Hackathorne as Bertrand Von Klassner at age 20
- Peggy Schaffer as Bertha Von Klassner
- Jess Herring as Old Servant

== Reception ==
Variety's review was positive, praising the acting, save for Edward Coxen. The reviewer said of his acting "It is a pity that a really good picture should be marred by one so unsuited to the role of the stalwart young fellow."

== Preservation ==
A complete copy is held by the UCLA Film & Television Archive.

== Bibliography ==
- Connelly, Robert B. The Silents: Silent Feature Films, 1910-36, Volume 40, Issue 2. December Press, 1998.
