= More Trouble =

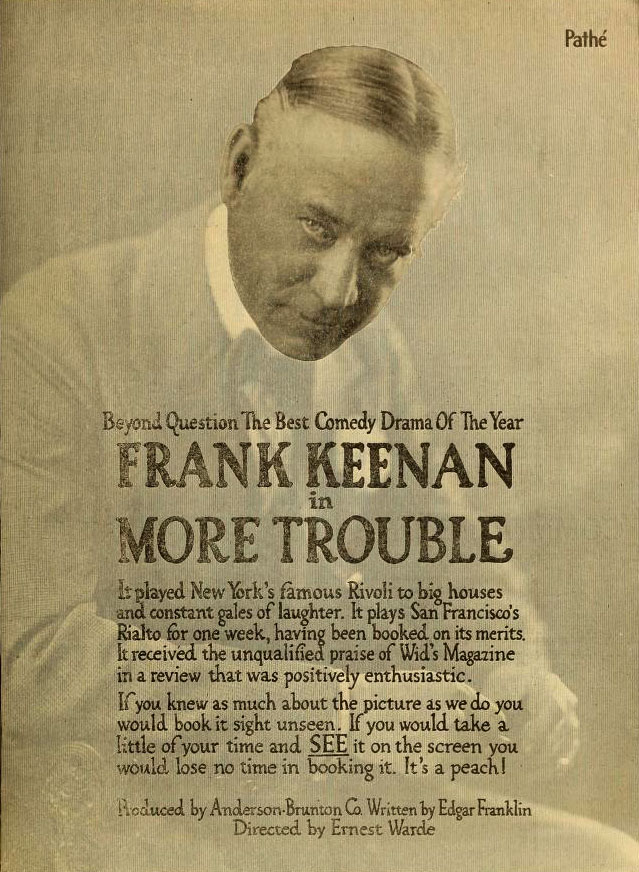
- Advertisement for the film from a 1918 issue of Moving Picture World
- Directed by: Ernest C. Warde
- Written by: Ouida Bergère (scenario); Edgar Franklin (story)
- Starring: Frank Keenan; John Gilbert
- Cinematography: Charles Kaufman
- Production company: Anderson-Brunton Co.
- Distributed by: Pathé Exchange
- Release date: July 14, 1918
- Running time: 5 reels
- Country: United States
- Languages: Silent; English intertitles

More Trouble is a 1918 American silent situation comedy film directed by Ernest C. Warde based on a story by Edgar Franklin and adapted for the screen by Ouida Bergère. The film was released by Pathé Exchange in July 1918, but had a pre-release screening at New York's Rivoli Theatre in May of that same year.

== Plot ==
As described in film magazines, wealthy steel-mill owner, Lemuel Deering (Keenan), welcomes his son Harvey (Gilbert) back from college. Not long after Harvey arrives home, bills begin rolling in for all sorts of vices: alcohol, pool, cigars, etc. Thinking his son an upstanding young citizen, Lemuel is appalled and Harvey denies that he had anything to do with the bills. Eventually, a bill comes in for $25,000. Lemuel refuses to pay and the bank forecloses on his mill.

Harold, Harvey's friend from college, shows up and admits that he has been forging Harvey's signature because his own father has cut him off. Harold had trusted that Harvey would not turn him in out of loyalty as a fraternity brother.

== Cast ==
- Frank Keenan as Lemuel Deering
- John Gilbert as Harvey Deering
- Ida Lewis as Mrs. Deering
- Roberta Wilson as Miriam Deering
- Joseph J. Dowling as Cecil Morrowton
- Jack Rollens as Harold Morrowton
- Helen Dunbar as Mrs. Morton Wells
- Albert Ray as Jack Wells
- Clyde Benson as Barnabas Bandwig
- Aggie Herring as Mary
- Lule Warrenton as The Housekeeper

== Preservation ==
With no prints of More Trouble located in any film archives, it is considered a lost film. In February 2021, the film was cited by the National Film Preservation Board on their Lost U.S. Silent Feature Films list.
