= The Joyous Liar =

1919 film directed by Ernest C. Warde

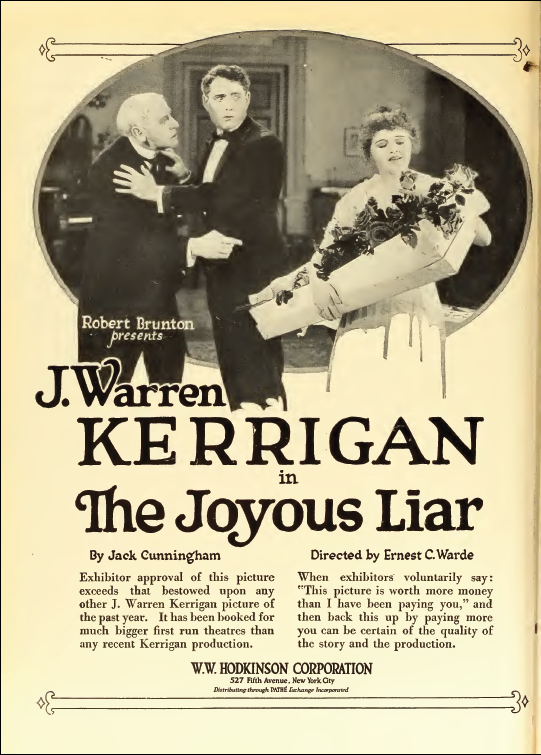
- Trade advertisement
- Directed by: Ernest C. Warde
- Written by: Jack Cunningham
- Starring: J. Warren Kerrigan; Lillian Walker; Joseph J. Dowling
- Cinematography: Charles E. Kaufman
- Production companies: J. Warren Kerrigan Productions; Robert Brunton Productions
- Distributed by: W. W. Hodkinson Corporation; Pathé Exchange
- Release date: December 1919
- Running time: 50 minutes
- Country: United States
- Language: Silent (English intertitles)

The Joyous Liar is a 1919 American silent comedy film directed by Ernest C. Warde and starring J. Warren Kerrigan, Lillian Walker, and Joseph J. Dowling. It is not known whether the film currently survives.

== Cast ==
- J. Warren Kerrigan as Burke Harlan
- Lillian Walker as Anne Warren
- Joseph J. Dowling as Wilbur Warren
- Albert R. Cody as James Roth
- Pell Trenton as Jimmy MacDonald
- Alfred Hollingsworth as James MacDonald

== Bibliography ==
- John Flowers and Paul Frizler. Psychotherapists on Film, 1899-1999: A Worldwide Guide to Over 5000 Films, Volume 1. McFarland, 2004.
