= Fritzi Brunette =

American actress (1890–1943)

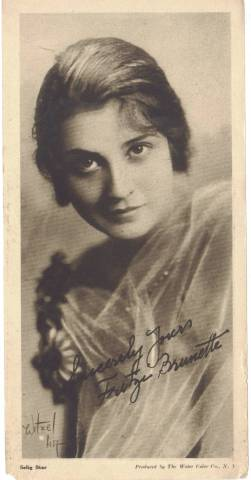
- Born: Florence Brunet; May 27, 1890; Savannah, Georgia, U.S.
- Died: September 28, 1943 (aged 53); Hollywood, California, U.S.
- Occupation: Actress
- Years active: 1912–1942
- Spouse(s): William Robert Daly (died 1935); John E. Kley

Fritzi Brunette (born Florence Brunet; May 27, 1890 – September 28, 1943) was an American actress.

== Early years ==
Fritzi Brunette was born Florence Brunet in Savannah, Georgia, or in Boston although some sources list her birthname as Florence Simone. She was educated in New York City.

== Career ==
Brunette made her film debut in the 1912 short A Waiter of Weight, followed by The Joy Ride (1912), and His Neighbor's Wife (1912). Brunette appeared in films such as Unto Those Who Sin (1916), in which she played a working girl of squalor, lured by wealth and luxury, The Woman Thou Gavest Me (1919), While Satan Sleeps (1922), Bells of San Juan (1922), and Camille of the Barbary Coast (1925).

In the 1930s and 1940s, Brunette mainly acted in uncredited roles, with her final screen appearance being in You're Telling Me (1942).

== Personal life ==
Brunette was the third wife of William Robert Daly, a silent film actor and director. Daly, who died around 1935, directed Brunette in many films. After Daly's death, she married Louisville, Kentucky real estate operator John E. Kley.

== Death ==
Brunette died after an extended illness on September 28, 1943, aged 53.

== Filmography ==
- The Joy Ride (1912) (as Miss Fritzi)
- His Neighbor's Wife (1912) (as Miss Fritzie)
- For the Good of All (1912) (as Miss Fritzie)
- Babies Three (1912)
- Mates and Mis-Mates (1912) .... Mabel Wentworth
- Her Life's Story (1912) .... Lucy Allen
- Dora (1912) .... Mary
- As the Wind Blows (1912) .... The Summer Girl
- Two Women (1912) .... The Wife
- On the Danger Line (1912)
- Was Mabel Cured? (1912)
- It Happened Thus (1912) .... The Younger Daughter
- Foolishness of Oliver (1912)
- The Consequences (1912)
- The Professor's Dilemma (1912)
- The Grouch (1913)
- The Lie (1913)
- The Hypocrite (1913)
- Sunny Smith (1913)
- The Appeal (1913)
- That Boy from Missouri (1913)
- Annie Laurie (1913) .... Annie Laurie
- For the Sins of Another (1913) .... Violet Denton, Philip's Sister
- The Winner (1913)
- For Old Love's Sake (1913)
- The Ring of Sorrow (1913)
- Where the Hop Vine Twines (1913)
- Admission — Two Pins (1914)
- The Militant (1914)
- Forgiven; Or, The Jack of Diamonds (1914) .... Leone Diamond
- The Greater Power (1915)
- The Emigrant's Peril (1915)
- Back of the Shadows (1915)
- Goaded by Jealousy (1915)
- A Skin Game (1915)
- Her Wedding Night (1915)
- A Case of Beans (1915)
- 'Neath Calvary's Shadows (1915)
- The Price She Paid (1915)
- The Tiger Slayer (1915)
- When California Was Wild (1915)
- The Keeper of the Flock (1915)
- Diamonds Are Trumps (1916)
- Virtue Triumphant (1916)
- The Uncut Diamond (1916)
- Unto Those Who Sin (1916) .... Nadia
- A Serpent in the House (1916)
- At Piney Ridge (1916) .... Cindy Lane
- The Reprisal (1916)
- Out of the Mist (1916)
- Beware of Strangers (1917) .... Bertha Gibson
- The Jaguar's Claws (1917) .... Beth Thomas
- The Golden Bullet (1917)
- Who Shall Take My Life? (1917) .... Kate Taylor
- And a Still Small Voice (1918) .... Mary Singleton
- The City of Purple Dreams (1918) .... Esther Strom
- The Still Alarm (1918) .... Undetermined Role
- Playthings (1918) .... Marjorie North
- The Velvet Hand (1918) .... Gianna Russelli
- The Sealed Envelope (1919) .... Lena
- The Railroader (1919) .... Anice Lanier
- Whitewashed Walls (1919) .... Concha
- The Woman Thou Gavest Me (1919) .... Alma
- Jacques of the Silver North (1919) .... Memory Baird
- A Sporting Chance (1919) .... Gilberte Bonheur
- The Woman Under Cover (1919) .... Alma Jordan
- The Lord Loves the Irish (1919) .... Sheila Lynch
- Live Sparks (1920) .... Myrtle Pratt
- The Dream Cheater (1920) .... Pauline Mahon
- Number 99 (1920) .... Cynthia Vivian
- The Green Flame (1920) .... Ruth Gardner
- $30,000 (1920) .... Aline Norton
- The House of Whispers (1920) .... Barbara Bradford
- The Devil to Pay (1920) .... Dare Keeling
- The Coast of Opportunity (1920) .... Janet Ashley
- Tiger True (1921) .... Mary Dover
- The Butterfly Girl (1921) .... Lorna Lear
- A Wife's Awakening (1921) .... Florence Otis
- Discontented Wives (1921) .... Ruth Gaylord
- Sure Fire (1921) .... Elinor Parker
- The Man from Lost River (1921) .... Marcia
- Give Me My Son (1922)
- While Satan Sleeps (1922) .... Salome Deming
- The Crusader (1922) .... Alice
- Bells of San Juan (1922) .... Dorothy Page
- The Boss of Camp 4 (1922) .... Iris Paxton
- The Other Side (1922)
- The Footlight Ranger (1923) .... Janet Ainslee
- Cause for Divorce (1923) .... Laura Parker
- Camille of the Barbary Coast (1925) .... Maggie Smith
- The Pace That Thrills (1925) .... Paula
- The Virgin Wife (1926) .... Mrs. Henry Lattimer
- Driftwood (1928) .... Lola
- Rustlers of Red Dog (1935) .... Saloon girl
- Tailspin Tommy in The Great Air Mystery (1935) (uncredited) .... Dinner Guest [Ch. 1]
- This is the Life (1935) (uncredited)
- San Francisco (1936) (uncredited)
- Maid of Salem (1937) (uncredited) .... Bit Part
- Way Out West (1937) (uncredited) .... Audience at saloon
- Make Way for Tomorrow (1937) (uncredited) .... Bit Role
- Souls at Sea (1937) (uncredited) .... Bit Role
- Wells Fargo (1937) (uncredited) .... Pioneer Woman
- Disbarred (1939) (uncredited) .... Maid
- Persons in Hiding (1939) (uncredited) .... Automobile Passenger
- Stagecoach (1939) (uncredited) .... Bit part
- The Star Maker (1939) (uncredited)
- Honeymoon in Bali (1939) .... Secretary
- $1000 a Touchdown (1939) (uncredited) .... McGlen Wife
- Edison, the Man (1940) (uncredited)
- Meet John Doe' (1941) (uncredited) .... Bit part
- You're Telling Me (1942) (uncredited)
