= Eliot Howe =

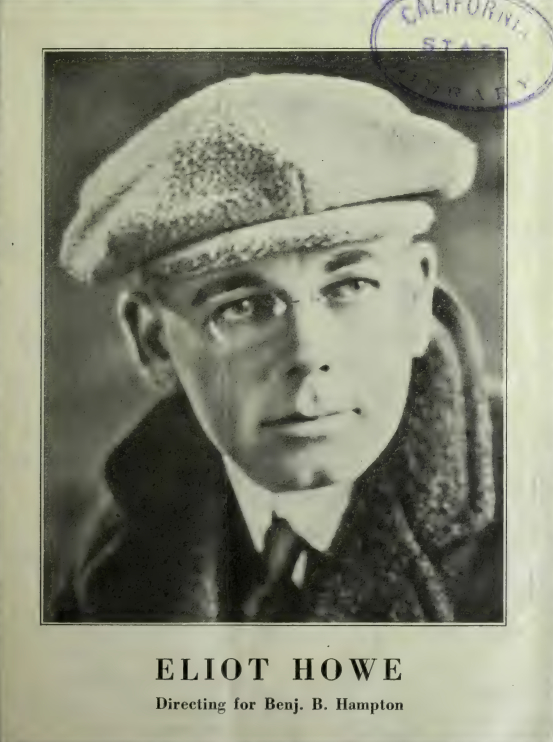
Eliot Howe (1882-1921)

Eliot Callender Howe (1882-1921) was an American director of silent films.

== Biography ==
Howe was born on December 23, 1882, in Boston, Massachusetts. He attended Throop College (now California Institute of Technology) in Pasadena, California. On January 1, 1914, he married actress Janice Vincent, (born Alpha Omega Howe) in Venice, California. The couple had one son, Eliot E., born in 1921. Howe died of a heart attack on December 18, 1921, in Los Angeles, shortly after completing the film Wild Fire.

== Filmography ==
- A Certain Rich Man (1921); (with Howard Hickman)
- The Lure of Egypt (1921); (with Howard Hickman)
- The Man of the Forest (1921); (with Howard Hickman)
- The Mysterious Rider (1921); (with Benjamin B. Hampton)
- Heart's Haven (1922); (with Jean Hersholt)
- The Grey Dawn (1922); (with Jean Hersholt); Brunton Studios
- Wild Fire (with Jean Hersholt); Brunton Studios
