= Jack Cunningham (screenwriter) =

American screenwriter

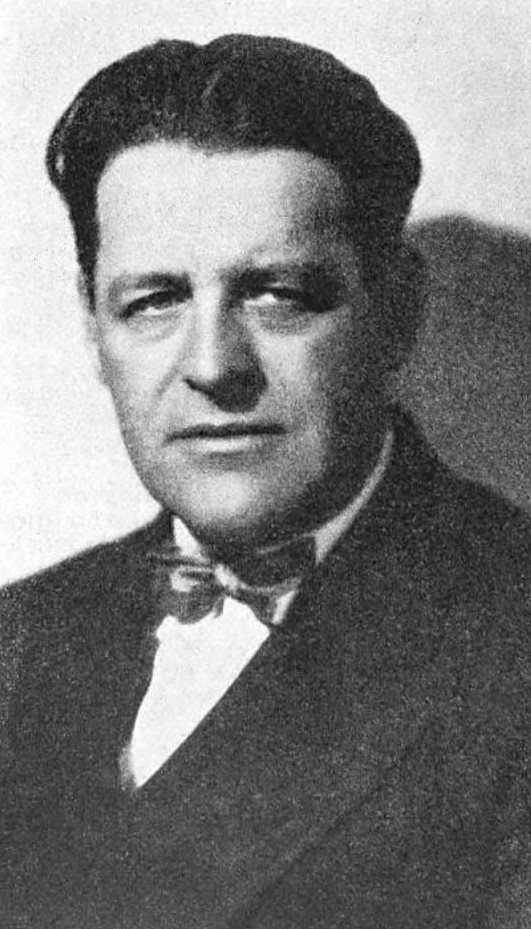
- Born: April 1, 1882; Ionia, Iowa, US
- Died: October 4, 1941 (aged 59); Santa Monica, California, US
- Occupation: Screenwriter
- Years active: 1913–1939

Jack Cunningham (April 1, 1882 – October 4, 1941) was an American screenwriter. He wrote for more than 130 films between 1913 and 1939. He was born in Ionia, Iowa, and died from a cerebral hemorrhage in Santa Monica, California.

== Selected filmography ==
- The Stainless Barrier (1917)
- The Medicine Man (1917)
- A Stormy Knight (1917)
- The Wrong Man (1917)
- Limousine Life (1918)
- A Law Unto Herself (1918)
- Hands Up! (1918)
- The Bells (1918)
- The Border Raiders (1918)
- A Burglar for a Night (1918)
- The Narrow Path (1918)
- The Goddess of Lost Lake (1918)
- The Ghost of the Rancho (1918)
- Little Red Decides (1918)
- All Wrong (1919)
- The False Code (1919)
- The Joyous Liar (1919)
- Todd of the Times (1919)
- The World Aflame (1919)
- Daredevil Jack (1920)
- The Dream Cheater (1920)
- The House of Whispers (1920)
- $30,000 (1920)
- Number 99 (1920)
- Live Sparks (1920)
- The Green Flame (1920)
- The Devil to Pay (1920)
- Double Adventure (1921)
- A Wife's Awakening (1921)
- The Rowdy (1921)
- Where Lights Are Low (1921)
- The Avenging Arrow (1921)
- Beyond the Rocks (1922)
- A Trip to Paramountown (1922, short)
- The Covered Wagon (1923)
- A Gentleman of Leisure (1923)
- Homeward Bound (1923)
- The Light That Failed (1923)
- The Man Who Fights Alone (1924)
- Just a Woman (1925)
- The Black Pirate (1926)
- The Adventurer (1928)
- The Viking (1928)
- The Iron Mask (1929)
- The Guilty Generation (1931)
- The Deceiver (1931)
- The Rider of Death Valley (1932)
- The Texas Bad Man (1932)
- The Fourth Horseman (1932)
- Flaming Guns (1932)
- Terror Trail (1933)
- The Thundering Herd (1933)
- Under the Tonto Rim (1933)
- To the Last Man (1933)
- It's a Gift (1934)
- Mississippi (1935)
- Painted Desert (1938)
- Union Pacific (1939)
