= Silent Voices =

Silent Voice, Silent Voices or variants may refer to:

== Books ==
- The Silent Voices, 1892 poetry collection by Alfred, Lord Tennyson, see 1892 in poetry
- The Silent Voice, 1977 novel by Christopher Hodder-Williams
- A Silent Voice (manga) (Koe no Katachi), a Japanese manga
- Silent Voices novel by Ann Cleeves

== Film, stage, television ==
- The Silent Voice (play), a 1914 stageplay
- The Silent Voice (film), a 1915 silent melodrama film
- The Man Who Played God, a 1932 film also called "The Silent Voice"
- The Silent Voice (The Lone Ranger episode), a 1951 TV episode of The Lone Ranger, see List of The Lone Ranger episodes
- Silent Voices (2005 film), a UK docudrama released on DVD in 2008
- Silent Voice (2009 film), a French drama film
- A Silent Voice (film) (Koe no Katachi), a 2016 Japanese anime film based on the manga
- Silent Voice (1987 film), aka Amazing Grace And Chuck, starring Jamie Lee Curtis and Gregory Peck
- Silent Voices (2026 film), a short film directed by Nadine Misong Jin

== Music ==
- Silent Voices (band), a Finnish metal band

=== Albums ===
- Silent Voice, Sugizo
- Silent Voices, compilation album by Simon & Garfunkel

=== Songs ===
- "A Silent Voice", song by composer Frederic Cliffe
- "Silent Voice", song by Mumzy Stranger, 2015
- "Silent Voice" (サイレント・ボイス), song by Manami, 2005
- "Silent Voice" (サイレントヴォイス), song by Jun Hiroe used in Mobile Suit Gundam ZZ
- "Silent Voice", a song and single by Innocence, 1991
- "A Silent Voice", a song by FripSide from the album Decade, 2012
- "Silent Voice", a song by Shaman's Harvest song from the album Smokin' Hearts & Broken Guns, 2014
- "Silent Voices" (Dionne Warwick song), 1967

== See also ==
- Voice of Silence (disambiguation)
- The Voice of the Silence, Helena Blavatsky
