= The Silent Voice (film) =

1915 film by William Bowman

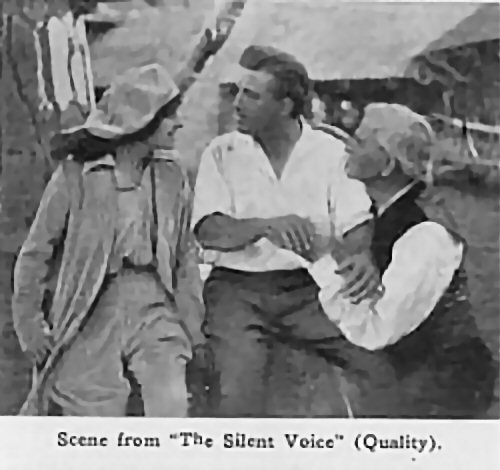
- L-R Marguerite Snow, Francis X. Bushman and Frank Bacon
- Directed by: William J. Bowman
- Written by: I. K. Freedman; Eve Unsell
- Starring: Francis X. Bushman
- Cinematography: William F. Adler
- Production company: Quality Pictures
- Distributed by: Metro Pictures
- Release date: September 13, 1915
- Running time: 6 reels
- Country: USA
- Language: Silent ...English titles

The Silent Voice is a six-reel silent film melodrama produced in 1915 by Quality Pictures and distributed by Metro Pictures. The motion picture was directed by William J. Bowman and was adapted from the Jules Eckert Goodman play The Silent Voice by I. K. Freedman and Eve Unsell.

Goodman’s play, that originally starred Otis Skinner, was based on the Gouverneur Morris short story, The Man Who Played God which also served as the geneses for the 1932 film The Man Who Played God and the 1955 Liberace vehicle, Sincerely Yours.

The Silent Voice was released on September 13, 1915 with Francis X. Bushman and Marguerite Snow in the principal roles.

== Plot ==
The film tells the story of Franklyn Starr, a gifted musician who becomes embittered after he is stricken with a sudden onslaught of deafness and then suffers the loss of his beloved mother. He soon retreats to a remote cottage in the country with his loyal servant Spring to live out his life as a recluse.

Hiking in the woods one day, Starr stumbles upon a group of workers about to set off explosives and, oblivious to their warning cries, is injured in the detonation. Marjorie Blair, a young woman out horseback riding, comes to his aid, an act that would lead to courtship and marriage. Starr is happy, for once again life is good; until his cousin Bobby flirts with Marjorie giving him the mistaken impression the two were having an affair.

Starr’s despair is finally lifted after he decides to use his wealth to help others and is rewarded by the return of his hearing and reconciliation with Marjorie.

== Cast ==
- Francis X. Bushman ... Franklyn Starr
- Marguerite Snow ... Marjorie Blair
- Helen Dunbar ... Starr's Mother
- Frank Bacon ... Spring - Starr's Servant
- William Clifford ... Marjorie's Father
- Lester Cuneo ... Bobby Delorme
- Miss C. Henry ... Heloise Delorme
- Anne Drew ... Mildred Hallan

== Preservation status ==
This film is now considered a lost film.

== See also ==
- List of lost films
