= Sincerely Yours (film) =

1955 film by Gordon Douglas

- Directed by: Gordon Douglas
- Written by: Irving Wallace
- Based on: The Man Who Played God; 1912 story by Gouverneur Morris; 1914 play The Silent Voice by Jules Eckert Goodman
- Produced by: Henry Blanke
- Starring: Liberace; Joanne Dru; Dorothy Malone
- Cinematography: William H. Clothier
- Edited by: Owen Marks
- Music by: George Liberace; Rudolf Friml
- Production companies: International Artists, Ltd.
- Distributed by: Warner Bros. Pictures
- Release date: 2 November 1955
- Running time: 118 min
- Country: United States
- Language: English

Sincerely Yours is a 1955 Warner Color film romantic music comedy starring Liberace. It was Liberace's first starring motion picture and was a recreation of his concert performances and a remake of the Warner Bros. 1932 film The Man Who Played God, which was itself a remake of the 1922 film The Man Who Played God, also based on the 1914 Jules Eckert Goodman play The Silent Voice.

== Plot ==
Tony Warrin (Liberace) is a very successful pianist who can play practically any kind of music, from classical to Boogie-woogie. He has one ambition left, which is to play at Carnegie Hall. Although his manager, Sam Dunne (William Demarest), and secretary, Marion Moore (Joanne Dru)--who secretly loves him—feel Tony's playing has never been better, he decides to go see Zwolinski (Otto Waldis), the music teacher who made him the musician he is today. There he encounters Linda Curtis (Dorothy Malone), who mistakes him for Zwolinski and explains why she wishes to learn the piano.

In a whirlwind courtship, Tony takes out Linda socially and also performs on the piano for her. He proposes marriage, but since they just met, Linda asks for more time. Before a concert appearance in San Francisco she makes the acquaintance of Howard Ferguson (Alex Nicol), a soldier who has just returned home and intends to resume his career as a composer.

A concert date at Carnegie Hall is finally arranged, only to have tragedy befall Tony—a sudden loss of hearing. It is explained to him that an operation could either cure him or leave him totally deaf. Shaken by this turn of events, Tony turns reclusive and even suicidal inside his New York City penthouse. He learns lip-reading and begins to observe strangers in Central Park, including a young boy, Alvie (Richard Eyer), who also needs an operation.

The boy helps persuade Tony to take a risk, so he undergoes surgery and his hearing returns. He also spies Linda through binoculars with Howard and realizes they are in love, but Linda has been staying with Tony out of sympathy for his situation. Tony plays a Carnegie Hall concert and gives the couple his blessing. When he sees the loyal Marion, he realizes that they can have a future together.

== Cast ==
- Liberace as Anthony Warrin
- Joanne Dru as Marion Moore
- Dorothy Malone as Linda Curtis
- Lori Nelson as Sarah Cosgrove
- William Demarest as Sam Dunne
- Richard Eyer as Alvie
- Lurene Tuttle as Mrs. McGinley
- Alex Nicol as Howard

== Production ==
At the time, Liberace was at the height of his career when tapped by Warner Bros. for his first starring motion picture.

In April 1955, Modern Screen magazine claimed Doris Day had been most often mentioned as Liberace's leading lady, "but it is doubtful that Doris will play the role. Liberace’s name alone will pack theatres and generous Liberace would like to give a newcomer a break." Joanne Dru, an established movie actress, became the leading lady.

== Release and reception ==
When the film was released, the studio mounted an ad and poster campaign with Liberace's name in huge, eccentric, building-block letters above and much larger than the title. "Fabulously yours in his first starring motion picture!" was a tag line. The other players and staff were smallish at the bottom.

The film opened at the Paramount Theatre in New York City on November 2, 1955 with appearances by Liberace but performed disappointingly for the rest of the week only grossing $38,000. It closed the following week after just 13 days.

The film was a critical and commercial failure since Liberace proved unable to translate his eccentric on-stage persona to that of a movie leading man. Warner quickly issued a pressbook ad supplement with new "Starring" billing below the title, in equal plain letters: "Liberace, Joanne Dru, Dorothy Malone". TCM's Robert Osborne recalls a more dramatic demotion: When Sincerely Yours played first run at the Orpheum in Seattle, the billing was altered even more: Joanne Dru, Dorothy Malone, and Alex Nicol above the title (with big head shots of all three) and below the title in much smaller letters: "with Liberace at the piano". Originally, Sincerely Yours was meant to be the first of a two-picture movie contract but the studio then bought back the contract, effectively paying Liberace not to make a second movie. The experience left Liberace so shaken that he largely abandoned his movie aspirations.

The Los Angeles Times's review of the film stated that it was "unintentionally hilarious". Films and Filming criticized the film as being "drenched in coy bathos to the point of embarrassment".

The film is listed in Golden Raspberry Award founder John Wilson's book The Official Razzie Movie Guide as one of the 100 Most Enjoyably Bad Movies Ever Made.

== See also ==
- List of films featuring the deaf and hard of hearing

== Works cited ==
- Medved, Harry; Medved, Michael (1984). The Hollywood Hall of Shame: The Most Expensive Flops in Movie History. Angus & Robertson. ISBN 0207149291.
