= The Man Who Played God (1922 film) =

1922 film

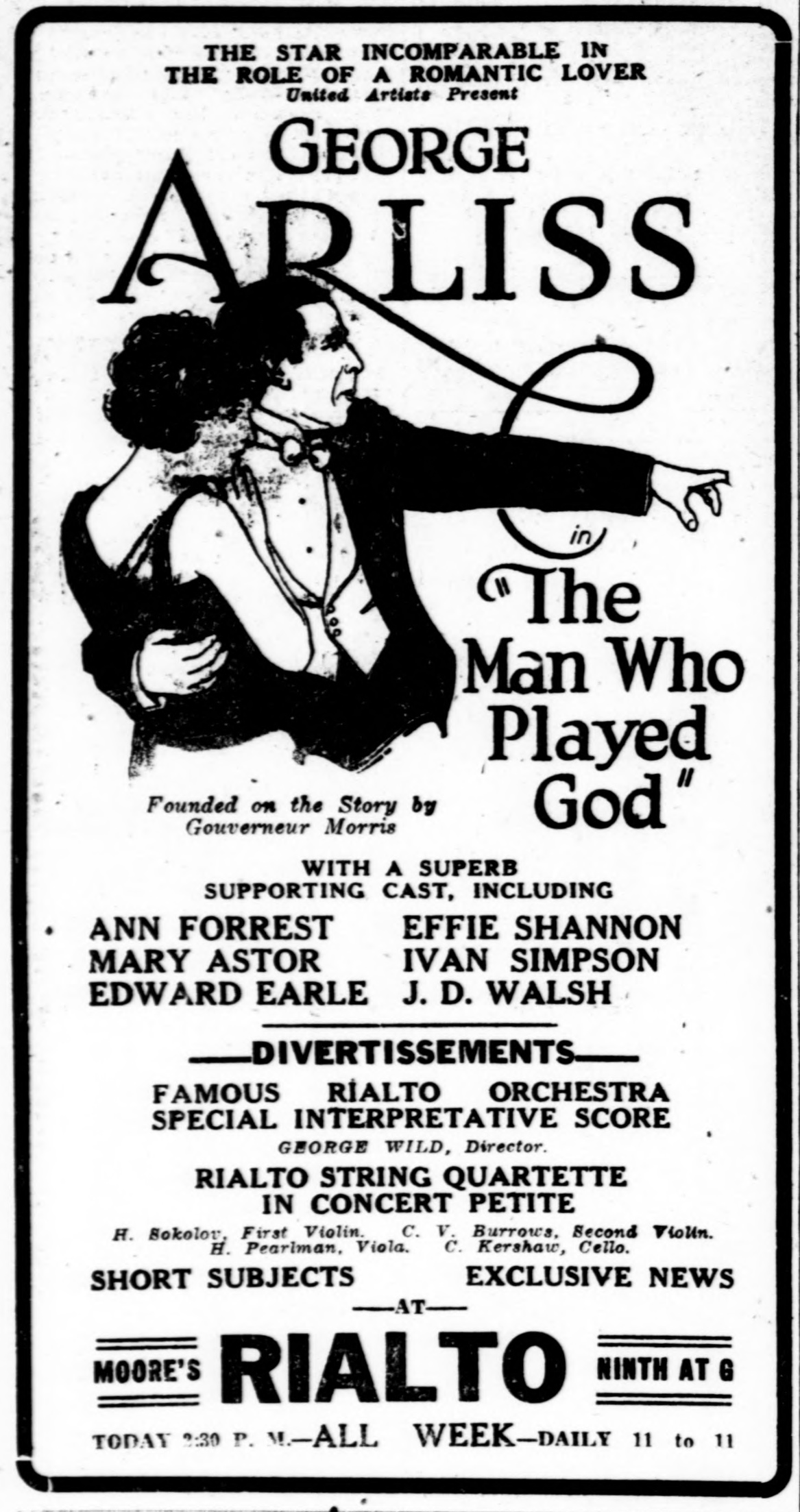
- Contemporary advertisement.
- Directed by: F. Harmon Weight
- Screenplay by: Forrest Halsey
- Based on: The Man Who Played God 1912 story in Cosmopolitan by Gouverneur Morris; The Silent Voice 1914 play by Jules Eckert Goodman
- Starring: George Arliss; Ann Forrest; Ivan Simpson; Edward Earle; Effie Shannon
- Cinematography: Harry Fischbeck
- Production company: Distinctive Productions
- Distributed by: United Artists
- Release date: October 1, 1922
- Running time: 60 minutes
- Country: United States
- Language: Silent (English intertitles)

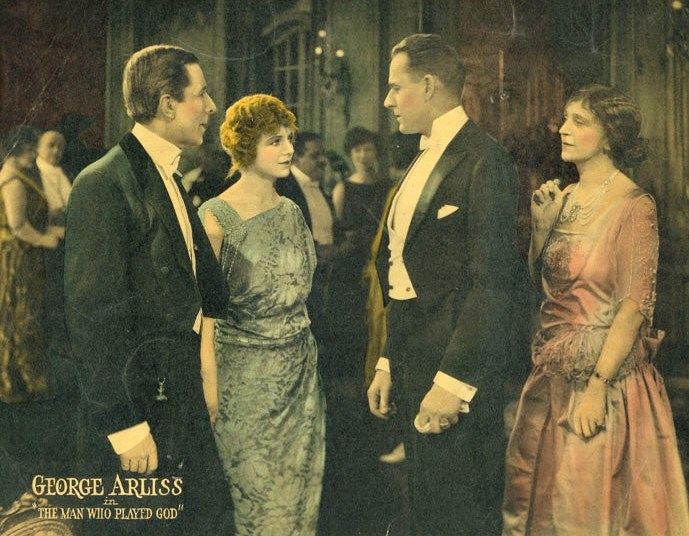
Lobby card for The Man Who Played God (1922)

The Man Who Played God is a 1922 American silent drama film directed by F. Harmon Weight and written by Forrest Halsey. The film stars George Arliss, Ann Forrest, Ivan Simpson, Edward Earle, and Effie Shannon. The film was released on October 1, 1922, by United Artists. Considered to be a lost film for decades, a print of The Man Who Played God was found at Gosfilmofond in Moscow.

== Plot ==
A famous pianist (Montgomery Royle) is engaged to a quite younger woman. An accidental explosion results in him becoming deaf but he learns to read lips quite quickly. He decides to use that skill to help random people around him. However, he sees his fiancee in a park with a different man. Montgomery is heartbroken, but after she confesses the truth to him, he helps her to be secure with the new man.

== Cast ==
- George Arliss as Montgomery Royle
- Ann Forrest as Marjory Blaine
- Ivan Simpson as Battle
- Edward Earle as Philip Stevens
- Effie Shannon as Mildred Arden
- Miriam Battista as Little Girl
- Mickey Bennett as Little Boy
- Mary Astor as Young Woman
- Pierre Gendron as Young Man
- Margaret Seddon as Old Woman
- John D. Walsh as Old Man
