= The Ace of Hearts (1921 film) =

1921 film by Wallace Worsley

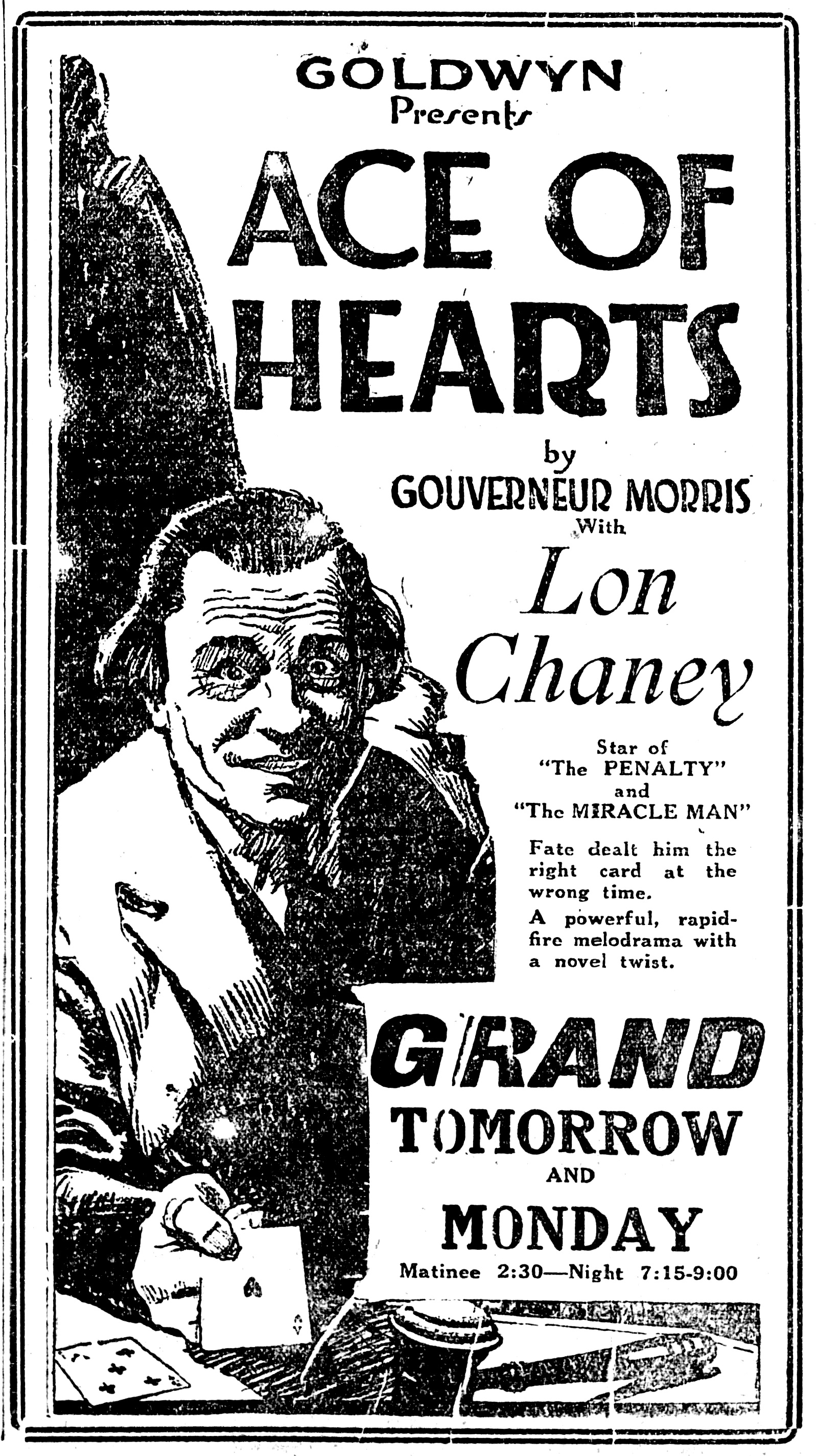
- Newspaper advertisement for the film, 1921
- Directed by: Wallace Worsley
- Written by: Ruth Wightman
- Based on: The Purple Flask; 1917 story in Cosmopolitan by Gouverneur Morris
- Produced by: Wallace Worsley
- Starring: Leatrice Joy; John Bowers; Lon Chaney; Hardee Kirkland; Raymond Hatton
- Cinematography: Don Short
- Music by: Vivek Maddala
- Distributed by: Goldwyn Pictures Corporation
- Release date: October 21, 1921
- Running time: 75 minutes
- Country: United States
- Languages: Silent; English intertitles

The Ace of Hearts (1921)

The Ace of Hearts is a 1921 American crime drama film produced and directed by Wallace Worsley. The screenplay by Ruth Wightman is based on Gouverneur Morris's story The Purple Flask, which was serialized in two parts in Cosmopolitan magazine in 1917. The film stars Leatrice Joy, John Bowers, Raymond Hatton and Lon Chaney. One unique feature of this film is that the main title of the movie isn't written on the screen; rather an Ace of Hearts card is shown in its place instead.

Prints of this film survive at the George Eastman House. The film is readily available on DVD. A still exists showing Lon Chaney as Farralone.

== Plot ==
A secret vigilante society's nine members pass judgment on others. They meet to decide the fate of a wealthy businessman they have been keeping under surveillance known as “The Man Who Has Lived Too Long” and vote to dispatch him with a homemade bomb concealed in a cigar case. Members Forrest and Farallone are both in love with the sole woman in the group, Lilith. Forrest openly declares his love, but is spurned by Lilith, who is completely devoted to the "Cause".

At a meeting later that day, as per their custom, Lilith deals playing cards, one at a time, to each of the society members; whoever receives the Ace of Hearts is to carry out the assassination. When Forrest is dealt the ace, Lilith offers to marry him that very day if it will give him courage. Forrest readily accepts, much to Farallone's distress. After the couple marries, the grief-stricken Farallone spends the night in the rain outside their apartment.

The next morning, Lilith has been transformed by her love. She begs Forrest not to go through with the assassination. He replies that he is honor-bound to carry out his mission. He goes to the café where his target habitually dines and where Forrest has taken a job as a waiter.

A distraught Lilith pleads with Farallone to stop Forrest. Farallone agrees to help the couple escape the society's punishment if Forrest fails his task, but extracts a promise of marriage from Lilith if Forrest is killed. Meanwhile, Forrest decides to abort his mission after he spies a young eloping couple seated next to the rich man’s table. When he returns to the secret council, the group's leader, Morgridge, sends the couple away to await Forrest's execution. Farallone begs the others to reconsider, but they are unmoved. When the cards are dealt, it is Farallone who gets the Ace of Hearts, meaning it is his task to kill Forrest. Laughing, he carries out his part of the bargain with Lilith by setting off the bomb at the secret society's table, killing all present. Lilith and Forrest are free to live their lives without fear of being stalked.

== Cast ==
- Leatrice Joy as Lilith
- John Bowers as Forrest
- Lon Chaney as Farallone (The character's name is spelled "Faralone" on the final title card only.)
- Hardee Kirkland as Morgridge
- Edwin N. Wallack as Chemist
- Raymond Hatton as The Menace
- Roy Laidlaw as Doorkeeper
- Cullen Landis as Young Man in Restaurant (uncredited)

== Production ==
The film was originally shot with a different ending in which Forrest, Lilith and their baby are shown living in the mountains, believing they have escaped death with Farallone's help. One day, Forrest discovers an Ace of Hearts card wedged in the bark of a tree and rushes back to the cabin only to discover Morgridge arriving, one of his arms amputated and his legs crippled. Morgridge, who somehow survived the bomb blast, tells the couple that Farallone’s sacrifice converted Morgridge to the ideal of love as a greater force for changing the world rather than death and destruction. When Sam Goldwyn saw a screening, he declared the ending preposterous and ordered that it be reshot. The new ending finished with Farralone's sacrifice and Lilith and Forest walking off together to start their new life together.

The Ace of Hearts was the second of the five productions that Lon Chaney made for Goldwyn Pictures between his contracts at Universal Pictures and Metro–Goldwyn–Mayer. It reunited him with director Wallace Worsley and co-star John Bowers after their work on The Penalty (1920), also based on a Gouverneur Morris novel. The film was one of Leatrice Joy’s last productions for Goldwyn before her move to Paramount Pictures the following year.

Exteriors for The Ace of Hearts were filmed at Pine Crest, California.

== Reception ==
"An excellent product from many angles...The picture is done in splendid, dignified style and has as its featured actor, Lon Chaney, whose (recent) work has added to his reputation as an actor of utmost sincerity and skill...The picture story carries with it a fine love story and an uplifting moral of self-sacrifice." -Variety

"It must be said of Gouverneur Morris' stories that they usually carry original ideas even though the author is inclined to overstep the mark in his search for novelty...Yet Morris for the sake of adding the romantic note, and giving his story some appeal, has robbed it of its reality. And probably, fear of the censors, that they might condemn the tale as unwholesome, compelled the author to watch his step. The action drags considerably though the lapses permit Lon Chaney and the other players to reveal some colorful character studies." --- Motion Picture News

"Ace of Hearts is far from being a cheerful picture, although its tone of gloom and murderous atmosphere is partly atoned for by a climax that leaves the hero and heroine safe and happy. The work of Lon Chaney as Farralone is excellent.....he fully lives up to his reputation." ---Exhibitor's Trade Review

"The motives that prompt the characters in this production are certainly not made clear in this pathological production. Lon Chaney does well in a difficult and improbable character." ---Film Daily
