= The Second in Command =

1915 film by William Bowman

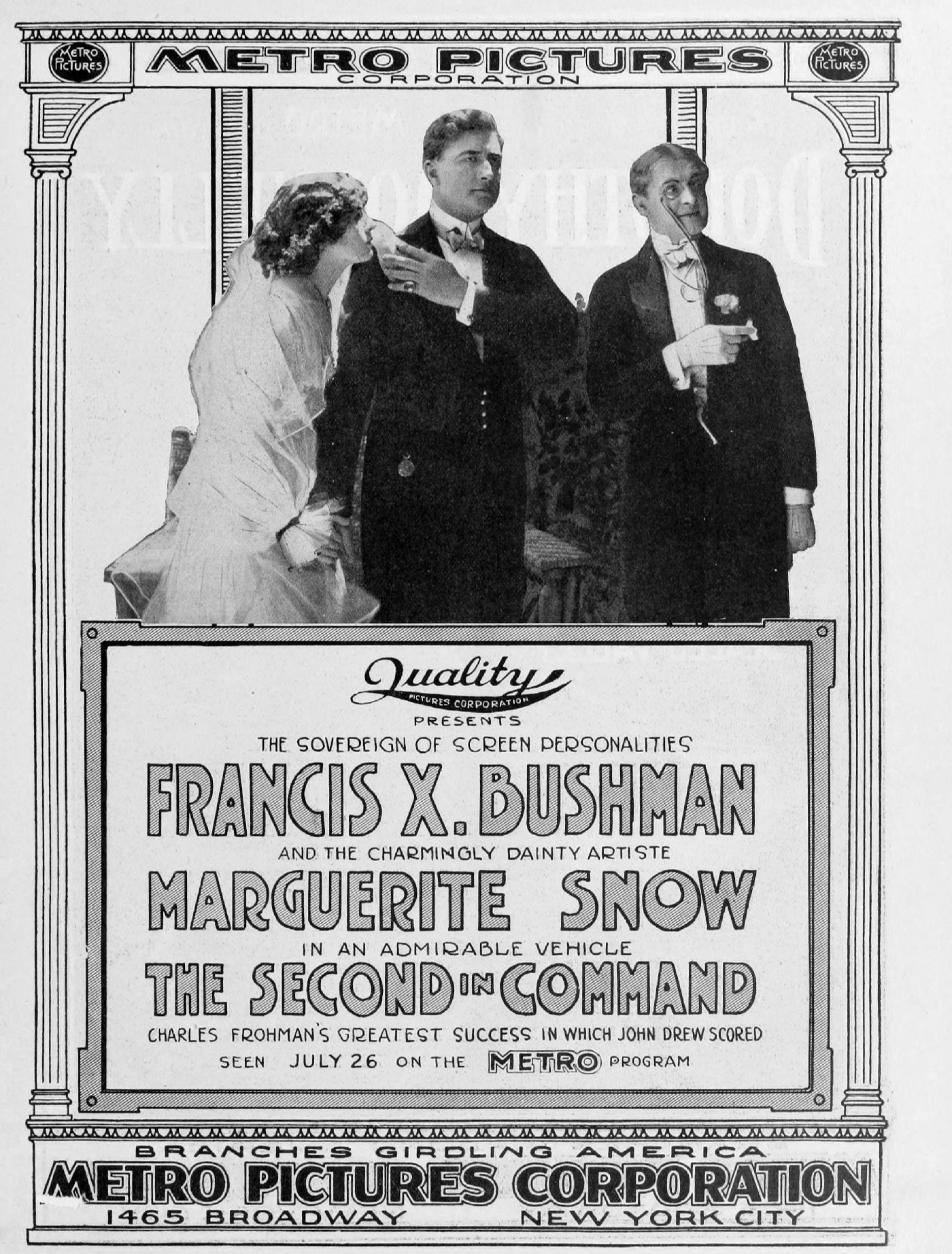
- Advertisement for film
- Directed by: William J. Bowman
- Written by: Eve Unsell (scenario)
- Based on: The Second in Command by Robert Marshall
- Produced by: Fred J. Balshofer
- Starring: Francis X. Bushman
- Cinematography: William F. Adler
- Production company: Quality Pictures
- Distributed by: Metro Pictures
- Release date: July 26, 1915
- Running time: 5 reels
- Country: United States
- Language: Silent (English intertitles)

The Second in Command is a 1915 American silent drama film directed by William J. Bowman and starring Francis X. Bushman and Marguerite Snow. The film is based on a 1901 Broadway play of the same name by Robert Marshall.

== Cast ==
- Francis X. Bushman as Lt. Col. Miles Anstruther
- Marguerite Snow as Muriel Mannering
- William Clifford as- Major Christopher Bingham
- Lester Cuneo as Lt. Sir Walter Mannering
- Helen Dunbar as Lady Sarah Harburgh
- Paul Byron as Hon. Bertie Carstairs
- Marcia Moore as Nora Vining
- Evelyn Greeley as Lady Harburgh's Maid

== See also ==
- Francis X. Bushman filmography

== Preservation status ==
A print of The Second in Command was donated by MGM, the inheritors of Metro Pictures, to the George Eastman House Motion Picture Collection.
