= The Man Who Played God (1932 film) =

1932 film

- Theatrical release poster
- Directed by: John G. Adolfi
- Written by: Julien Josephson; Maude T. Howell
- Based on: The Man Who Played God 1912 story in Cosmopolitan by Gouverneur Morris; The Silent Voice 1914 play by Jules Eckert Goodman
- Produced by: Darryl F. Zanuck
- Starring: George Arliss; Bette Davis; Violet Heming
- Cinematography: James Van Trees
- Edited by: William Holmes
- Music by: Leo F. Forbstein
- Distributed by: Warner Bros. Pictures
- Release date: February 20, 1932
- Running time: 80 minutes
- Country: United States
- Language: English
- Budget: $237,000
- Box office: $835,000

The Man Who Played God is a 1932 American pre-Code drama film produced by Darryl F. Zanuck and directed by John G. Adolfi. George Arliss stars as a concert pianist embittered by the loss of his hearing, who eventually finds redemption by helping others; it also features a then little-known Bette Davis as the much younger woman engaged to the protagonist.

Warner Bros. promoted the film as an example of how studios could produce motion pictures of social and moral value without the oversight of non-industry censors. It was modestly successful at the box office and was among Arliss' most popular films.

The film was a remake of a 1922 silent film of the same name. It stars Arliss and is based on a 1912 short story by Gouverneur Morris. It went on to become the 1914 play of the same name and the 1915 film, The Silent Voice, written by playwright Jules Eckert Goodman. In 1955 it was remade again as Sincerely Yours, starring Liberace.

== Plot ==
While giving a private performance for a visiting monarch, renowned concert pianist Montgomery Royle is permanently deafened when a bomb is detonated in an attempt to assassinate the foreign ruler; for him, his love of music and his career are over. Royle returns to New York City from Paris with his sister Florence, close friend and confidant Mildred Miller, and his considerably younger fiancée Grace Blair. His longtime manservant and admirer saves him from committing suicide. Mildred convinces Royle that he has never known true adversity, and he reveals that he no longer believes in God.

Abandoning thoughts of death, he learns to lip read perfectly from a skilled teacher. Thereafter, using a pair of powerful binoculars from his third story window, he spends his days observing and reading people's lips in nearby Central Park. As he becomes aware of other people's struggles, he helps them anonymously in his pursuit of "playing God"; his actions lack true sincerity. During the next six months of self-imposed withdrawal, he grows to accept his fate and continues with his philanthropy, becoming truly altruistic; he also reacquires his faith in God.

Months later, following Grace's return from an extended California visit with friends, he witnesses a conversation in the park between her and Harold Van Adam. She tells the young man that while she has fallen in love with him, she will not leave Montgomery due to his affliction and their long, close friendship. Moved by the generosity of her sacrifice, Montgomery talks with Grace and soon ends their engagement. He convinces her to follow her heart, the result of a true concern for her well-being.

Montgomery continues his philanthropy, while drawing even closer to Mildred, who he learns has always loved him; the two find mutual love and happiness together.

== Cast ==
- George Arliss as Montgomery Royle
- Violet Heming as Mildred Miller
- Bette Davis as Grace Blair
- Andre Luguet as The King
- Louise Closser Hale as Florence Royle
- Donald Cook as Harold Van Adam
- Ivan F. Simpson as Battle
- Oscar Apfel as The Lip Reader
- Charles E. Evans as The Doctor
- Hedda Hopper as Mrs Alice Chittendon
- William Janney as First Boy
- Murray Kinnell as King's Aide

== Production ==
Warners had made a silent version of The Man Who Played God in 1922, based on the 1914 play The Silent Voice by Jules Eckert Goodman, who adapted it from a story by Gouverneur Morris published in Cosmopolitan. For the 1932 film, a fresh adaptation was reworked by Julien Josephson and Maude T. Howell. Arliss also made some contributions to the screenplay for which he was paid, though not credited.

In September 1931, disappointed with the way her Hollywood career had failed to progress, Bette Davis was packing to return to New York City when George Arliss called and invited her to discuss the role of Grace Blair with him. Certain the caller was a prankster, Davis later recalled, "I replied in an imitative English accent" and told him "Of course, Mr. Arliss. How jolly decent of you". The actor finally convinced Davis it really was him on the phone, and she responded that she would meet him immediately. "My excitement and joy were indescribable ... An Arliss film was a prestige film – a far cry from The Menace, and yet Murray Kinnell of The Menace cast had suggested me for the part ... Out of all bad comes some good. I have always believed this".

At age sixty-three, more than ten years older than the character, Arliss knew he was too old for the role and was concerned the age difference between him and the actress cast as Grace Blair would be ridiculous, unless she were played by someone who could convey both love and hero worship for his character. After interviewing many young women, he felt Davis was the one most capable of handling the part. He sent her to studio makeup artist Perc Westmore, who suggested bleached blonde hair would heighten her screen appearance. "He was right. In The Man Who Played God – for the first time – I really looked like myself. It was for me a new lease on life". The two became close friends, and Westmore went on to do the make up for Davis in more than two dozen films.

After seeing a rough cut of the film, Jack L. Warner signed Davis to a five-year contract, starting at $400 per week. She would remain with Warner Bros. for the next eighteen years, and Davis was beholden to Arliss for the rest of her life, crediting him for "the career that finally emerged". Of Davis, Arliss wrote in his 1940 biography, My Ten Years in the Studios, "I did not expect anything except a nice little performance. But when we rehearsed, she startled me; the nice little part became a deep and vivid creation, and I felt rather humbled that this young girl had been able to discover and portray something that my imagination had failed to conceive ... I am not surprised that Bette Davis is now the most important star on the screen".

Classical music performed in the film includes Fantaisie-Impromptu by Frédéric Chopin, Moonlight Sonata by Ludwig van Beethoven, and Onward, Christian Soldiers by Arthur Sullivan.

== Release ==
The Man Who Played God was initially intended for a 1932 roadshow release. Warners reportedly changed tactics when the film received positive feedback from the so-called Hays organization; the studio decided it would be a timely example that motion pictures could be wholesome entertainment. (Note: According to a statement released by Warners, even other "industry leaders" supported the film and hoped it would "go a long way towards silencing the harping criticisms of would-be reformers".) Accordingly, after opening in brief special engagements on February 9 in Los Angeles and February 10th in New York, the film went into general release on February 20.

It was modestly successful at the box office and made a profit for the studio. It became one of Arliss' most popular films.

In England, censors objected to the picture's title and it was released as The Silent Voice.

=== Box office ===
According to Warner Bros records, the film earned $536,000 in the U.S. and $299,000 in other countries. It was the studio's most popular motion picture of 1931–32.

=== Critical reception ===
Mordaunt Hall of The New York Times opined, "It is a neatly conceived story as it comes to the screen, with effervescent cheer in the introductory sequences, then a period of melancholy, and finally episodes of thankfulness and happiness ... and while it seems a little lethargic at times, it has such a genuinely gentle and appealing touch that one would not wish it to be told any faster". He thought "Mr. Arliss delivers another of his effective and meticulous portrayals", but felt Davis "often speaks too rapidly". (Note: Davis agreed. "It was always difficult for me to speak slowly on or off the screen ... William Wyler, when he directed me in Jezebel, was constantly making me slow down".)

Martin Quigley, the trade paper publisher and Hays office insider, gave the film an enthusiastic recommendation in his Motion Picture Herald, and two of his staff did the same. The Film Daily review was also uniformly positive, focusing on Arliss' performance, and went so far as to say "[the picture] merits all the plugging exhibitors can give it".

Not all reviewers praised the film, however. Variety critic "Rush." thought that the short story was overextended as an 80-minute film: "... a picture which has everything in the way of garnishment, but little substance to be garnished". He found the Arliss and Davis portrayal of a May–December romance unconvincing and only singled out Heming for praise, noting the "quiet force" of her performance. The review in The Hollywood Reporter was titled "Clean, Wholesome, and Dull".

== Adaptations ==
The film was itself a remake of the 1922 silent of the same name. The most evident difference between these two was that the earlier film finished with the protagonist's hearing restored, a plot contrivance that garnered negative reviews and was ditched for the 1932 version. Arliss adapted the screenplay for Lux Radio Theatre as a 60-minute program, which aired on March 21, 1938, reprising his role as Royle; he was joined by his wife, Florence Arliss. Another one-hour radio version starring Raymond Massey was also presented April 17, 1942 on Philip Morris Playhouse. In 1955 Warners revised the story again as Sincerely Yours. It stars Liberace in the lead, whose hearing comes and goes, and was a famously unsuccessful remake.

== See also ==
- List of films featuring the deaf and hard of hearing
