= Ruth Wightman =

American screenwriter (1897-1939)

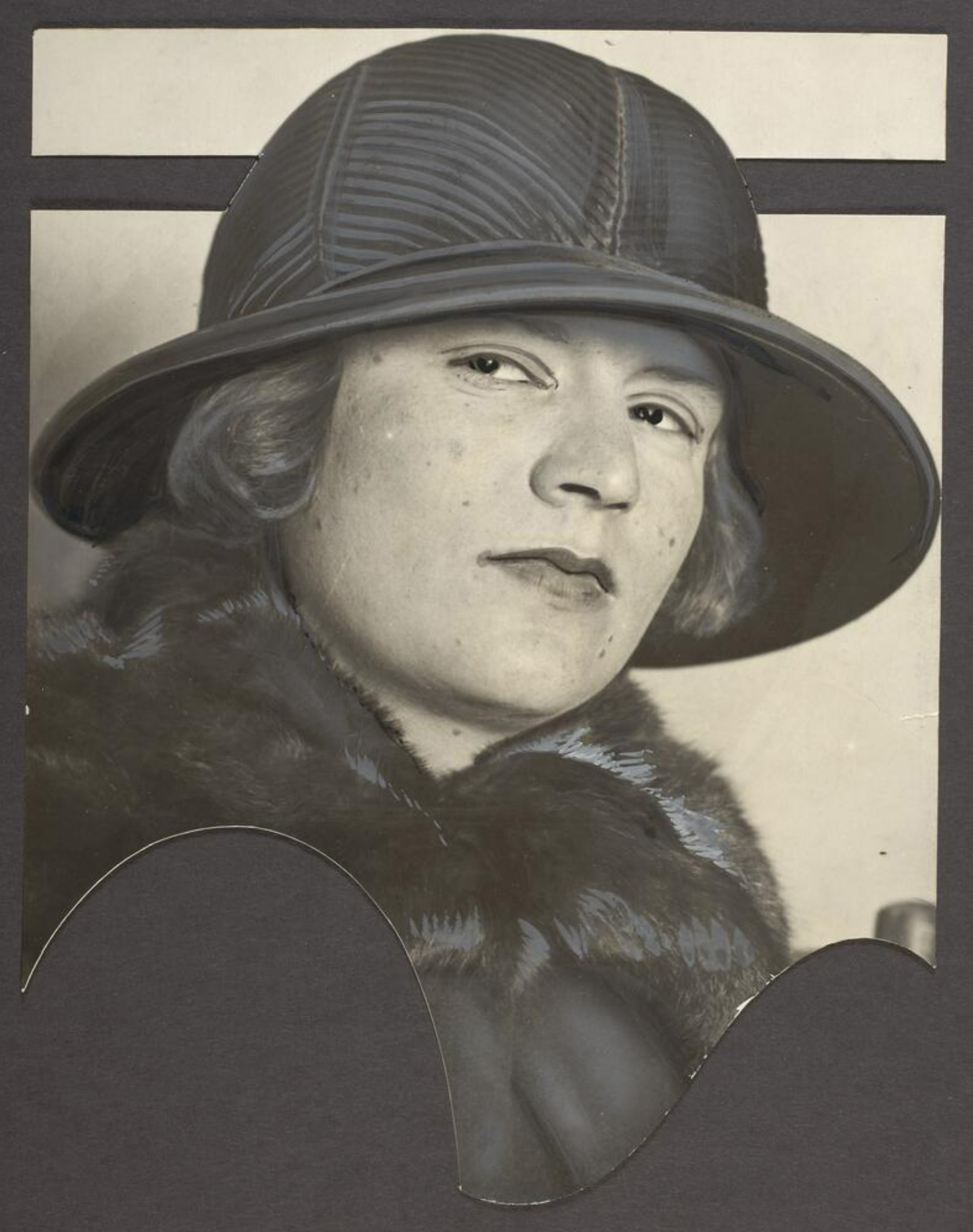
- Wightman in 1924
- Born: Ruth C. Wightman; August 15, 1897; Jamestown, New York, U.S.
- Died: April 19, 1939 (aged 41); Alameda, New Mexico, U.S.
- Occupation(s): Novelist, screenwriter
- Spouse: Gouverneur Morris (m. 1923)

Ruth Wightman (August 15, 1897 – April 19, 1939) was an American screenwriter, aviator, and race car driver who was married to the novelist Gouveneur Morris.

== Biography ==
Ruth, an only child, was born in Jamestown, New York, to John Wightman and Lulu Russell.

Ever the adventurer, she had a passion for flying and was noted as being one of the first women in the United States to be granted a pilot's license. She also competed in car races in Stockton, California, as a young woman, and was involved in a fatal crash in 1918.

In 1923, she married author Governeur Morris, for whom she had formerly worked as a secretary before beginning a career in the scenario department at Samuel Goldwyn Studio. The pair kept their marriage out of the newspapers for a year, as Morris was still waiting to be granted a divorce from his first wife, Elsie; they then held a second marriage ceremony to seal the deal and comply with California law.

Wightman died at a sanitarium in Alameda, New Mexico, in 1939 after a brief illness. She was survived by her husband; the pair had no children.

== Selected filmography ==
- The Beautiful Liar (1921)
- The Ace of Hearts (1921)

== See also ==
- Lila Lee
