= William Bowman (director) =

American actor, writer, and director (1884–1960)

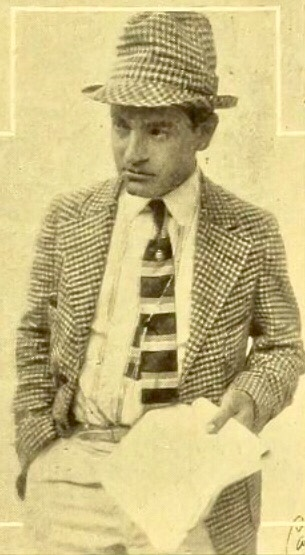
- Bowman in Motion Picture News, 1916
- Born: William J. Bowman; February 27, 1884; Bakersville, North Carolina, U.S.
- Died: January 1, 1960 (aged 75); Los Angeles, California, U.S.
- Occupations: Actor, film director, writer
- Years active: 1896-1921
- Spouse: Evelyn M. Bowman (m. 1925)

William J. Bowman (sometimes cited William J. Bauman; February 27, 1884 – January 1, 1960) was an American stage and film actor, writer, and director noted for his work in the early 1900s on silent productions for studios in New York, New Jersey, Chicago, and in Los Angeles during the first decade of filmmaking in and around Hollywood. His direction of a series of films with matinee idol Francis X. Bushman in 1915 and his direction of the serials The Invisible Hand in 1920 and The Avenging Arrow in 1921 form only a small part of Bowman's extensive filmography.

William J. Bowman's surname in some silent-era film reviews and news items, as well in some modern references on American film history, is occasionally misidentified or also cited as William J. "Bauman." (Note: An example of the confused spelling of Bowman's surname, as discussed later on this page, is given in a May 14, 1915 news item in the trade paper Variety, which announces "William J. Bauman" joining Metro's staff of directors.) It is significant that in the extensive "Studio Directory" published by the trade magazine Motion Picture News in January and October 1916 no "William J. Baumen" is mentioned among more than 2,000 "authorized" biographies of actors, actresses, directors, writers, technicians, executives, and "Other Members of the Film Industry." Only William J. Bowman, as a director, is profiled. The lack of any reference to a William J. Bauman in the editions of that directory, the absence of even a basic profile on him in earlier or later film-industry publications, and the attribution of credits to both men for the same films—such as The Starbucks, The Beautiful Unknown, and The Terror of the Fold—indicate that Bowman and Bauman were actually the same person. (Note: According to the 1910 and 1920 federal census, no William J. Bauman is listed working in the film industry in either California, New York, New Jersey, or Illinois at those times. In California in 1920 only two residents named "William J. Bauman" of appropriate ages are recorded to be living in the state in that year's census. One worked as a driver for a bakery in San Francisco; the other, as a retail merchant in Long Beach. Consequently, the absence of finding an actor or director named William J. Bauman in federal records or a specific biography under that name in film-industry publications of the era (as found for Bowman) support the contention that William J. Bowman and William J. Bauman were actually the same person whose film credits simply varied in their attributions.) (Note: There is one other "Bauman" listed in the 1916 Motion Picture News studio directory, an entry for "John M. Bauman". He is profiled as a native of Connecticut, who worked in the given period as a mechanical engineer and cameraman for the Thanhouser Company in New Rochelle, New York.)

== Early life ==
William Bowman was born in Bakersville, North Carolina, in 1884. As "a boy" he moved with his parents to California, where he later attended Lordsburg College, then located in Pomona. Bowman in college studied architecture and spent a short time working as a draftsman until his career interests turned to acting and the management of stage productions.

== Stage ==
In its January 29, 1916, issue, Motion Picture News provides a full-page biography of Bowman in its semiannual studio directory. The magazine notes the following about his early professional stage experience:

One of [Bowman's] early engagements was with Robert Mantell in 1896, where he appeared in "The Face in the Moonlight" and "The Corsican Brothers." With Jeanette Waldorf he toured the Orient, playing in Shakespeare. Upon his return to the States he played in the famous Frawley stock company at the Grand Opera House in San Francisco. (Note: The MPN citation of Bowman working with the celebrated Shakespearean stage actor Robert Mantell in 1896 is suspect, for Bowman would have been only 12 years old at that time. Still, Mantell did travel extensively performing in plays in cities and small towns throughout the United States between 1894 and 1899, so it is possible young Bowman was enlisted to participate in one of Mantell's performances while the veteran actor was in California. Refer to Clarence Joseph Bullie's work Robert Mantell's Romance.)

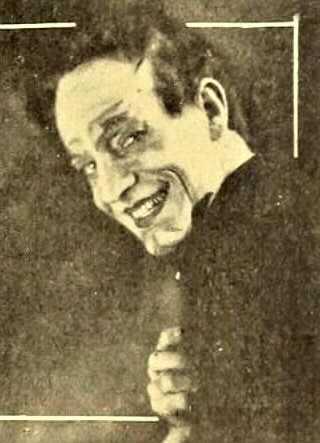
Bowman in makeup for his vaudeville "playet" The Devil, The Servant and The Man, c. 1906

Following his work with Frawley, around 1904, Bowman began working in vaudeville and created a number of acts that became "headliners" in major theaters on the vaudeville circuit. Some of those acts or "playets" included The Family Entrance, The Little Mother, and Quarantine. He also created another popular role for the vaudeville stage, portraying the devil in The Devil, The Servant and The Man on the Orpheum and Keith circuits. Bowman then returned to the legitimate stage and spent several seasons in Chicago serving as a leading man in productions presented by The Imperial and Bush Temple stock companies.

== Film ==
=== Early career (1910–1914) ===
After gaining considerable acting experience on stage, Bowman was invited by Edwin Thanhouser to join his new motion-picture company, which he had established in 1909 in New Rochelle, New York. Bowman moved to New Rochelle in the latter months of 1910 and took residence at 276 Huguenot Street. He first appeared in the Thanhouser Company's short The Old Curiosity Shop, released in January 1912. That was followed by roles in Silas Marner, Under Two Flags, as Shylock in Shakespeare's The Merchant of Venice, and performances in Now Watch the Professor, For the Mikado, and other productions.

Bowman worked with Thanhouser for two years. He then moved to Chicago to direct and act in films for the American Film Manufacturing Company. One his notable directoral projects for that studio was a three-reel adaptation of journalist Opie Read's 1902 book The Starbucks. Soon, though, after the New York Motion Picture Company began moving its operations to California in 1912, Bowman relocated to the West Coast to direct films for "NYMPC", his first three productions for that studio being The Iconoclast, The Lure of the Violin, and Retrogression in 1913. (Note: The New York Motion Picture Company changed its name to the New York Picture Corporation in 1912, so the company after that year is also cited in references as "NYPC".) Bowman remained with NYMPC for six months and then began working on projects for the western division of Vitagraph. His first production for that studio was Master of the Mines followed by Ghosts, Inasmuch, The Face of Fear, and The King's Men. He both starred in and directed those films.

According to Motion Picture News, it was in this period that Bowman also traveled on location to Oklahoma to direct three Vitagraph Westerns at the legendary Miller Brothers 101 Ranch. He then returned to the East Coast to direct three films of various lengths for Universal Pictures at Victor Studios' facilities in Fort Lee, New Jersey. The most elaborate work of those productions, released in December 1914, was a four-reeler titled The Beautiful Unknown. Bowman then began to produce his own longer "photoplays", one being the six-reeler The Tale of the North.

=== Quality Pictures and Metro (1915) ===
While still producing independently in New York, Bowman met Fred J. Balshofer of Quality Picture Corporation, a studio affiliated with Metro Pictures. Bowman accepted Balshofer's offer to return to California to direct several of that company's important productions in 1915. The entertainment trade paper Variety in its May issue that year announces his new job. "William J. Bauman", it reports, "and Lawrence B. McGill have been added to the directing staff of Metro." Three of the films that Bowman then completed for Quality/Metro between the late spring and early fall of 1915 include The Second in Command, The Silent Voice, and Pennington's Choice, all starring Francis X. Bushman. In its review of The Second in Command in July, Variety compliments the direction of the film's battle scenes of the Boer War, describing them as "well worked out". The popular entertainment paper did, though, find the overall production "most tiring to watch" and blamed part of that wearying effect on "the number of times the director moves both the camera and people at the same time, keeping the picture flickery."

Before the end of 1915, Quality Pictures decided to close its California operations and reconsolidate its businesses in New York. Wanting to remain in Los Angeles, Bowman ended his association with Quality but still finished his last production for the studio, co-directing Rosemary with Balshofer.

=== Later work (1916–1921) ===
He then started working as a director for David Horsley, a producer and the founder of Centaur Film Company. Variety announces that move to work with Horsley in its December 3 edition; yet, once again, the New York-based trade paper refers to Bowman as "William J. Bauman" in its Hollywood news item, adding that he "is at present directing his first picture. It is in two reels and entitled 'The Terror of the Fold'". Bowman in 1916 went on to direct more Centaur films for Horsley after Terror of the Fold, two of those being much longer five-reelers, The Bait and The Heart of Tara, released during the first quarter of that year. Bowman not only directed The Bait he also wrote the screenplay in collaboration with Theodosia Harris.

Following his association with Horsley, Bowman continued directing and on occasion acting. He returned briefly to Universal and Victor Studios in mid-1916 to direct The Golden Boots and From Broadway to a Throne, a film also written by Bowman. In its review of the latter in July that year, Motion Picture News gives the production a tepid or "even" review, finding its fight scenes interesting but the story weak on comedy, noting "The only trouble is, Mr. Bowman has not put enough [humor] in the picture's five reels."

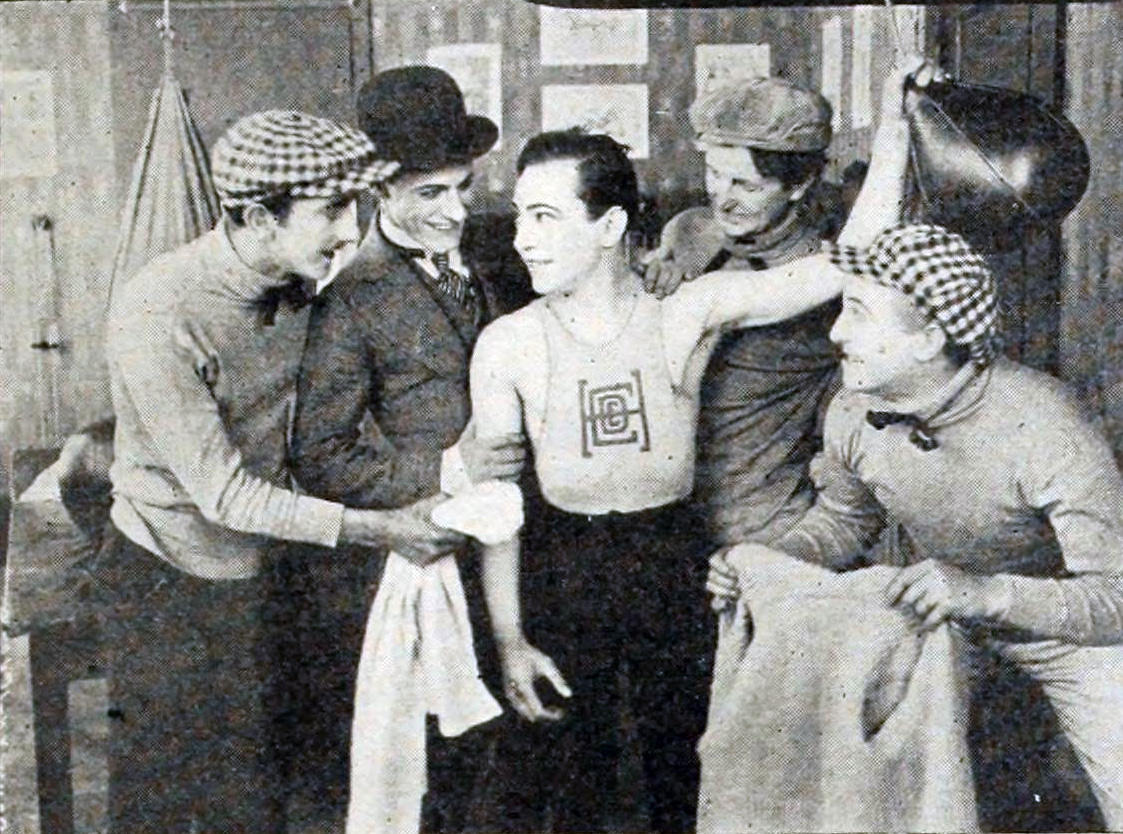
Scene in From Broadway to a Throne (1916), "written and produced by William Bowman". Carter De Haven (center) starred in the five-reeler.

Bowman's known filmography becomes rather sparse after his work on From Broadway to a Throne. In its film-industry directory published in October 1916, Motion Picture News identifies him as "now [an] independent producer" in his biographical entry in that reference. The trade magazine also provides Bowman's contact information, citing it as the "Elks' Club, Santa Monica, Cal." Another trade publication, Moving Picture World, announced in December 1916 that "Director William J. Bauman and Director Rice" [A. W. Rice] had been hired to work on and complete The Planter, an ambitious seven-reeler that was being filmed on location in Guatemala by the Nevada Motion Picture Corporation. According to Moving Picture World, that studio was largely funded as "a hobby" by F. M. Manson, a "Nevada mining millionaire"; and he hired "Bauman" and Rice to travel to Guatemala as replacements for "Director John Ince and Assistant Director Joseph Boyle", who had "left the company".

Later, in 1919, Bowman apparently resumed acting as well, for that year he is credited with performing as Captain Osborne in Paramount's World War I drama The False Faces. (Note: The gap in Bowman's known filmography during 1917 and 1918 are not due to any military service on his part during World War I. Later in the United States Census of 1930, he classifies himself as a non-veteran.) After that film, he is credited for directing the Vitagraph feature The Veiled Mystery, two later shorts, and the serials The Invisible Hand in 1920 and The Avenging Arrow for Pathé in 1921. Some modern film references state that Bowman's screen career had ended by "the very early 1920s"; but nearly a decade after his work on The Avenging Arrow, he still identified himself in the 1930 federal census as being employed as a "Director [of] Moving Pictures".

== Personal life and death ==
According to federal census records, Bowman by 1930 was living with his wife "Evelyn M" in a home they owned on Beach Street in Oceanside, California, a small town in San Diego County. Evelyn, as recorded in the same census, was a native of Texas and married Bowman five years earlier.

In 1960, William died while still residing in San Diego County.

== Partial filmography ==
Since William Bowman served as an actor in some of his films, as a director in others, and in both capacities in still others, the following productions are marked accordingly to distinguish his work in both shorts and features:

Year	Title	Actor	Director
1911	The Old Curiosity Shop	Yes	
1911	Silas Marner	Yes	
1911	The Merchant of Venice	Yes	
1912	Under Two Flags	Yes	
1912	Now Watch the Professor	Yes	
1912	Two Souls	Yes	
1912	For the Mikado	Yes	
1913	The Starbucks		Yes
1913	The Iconoclast		Yes
1913	The Lure of the Violin		Yes
1913	Retrogression		Yes
1914	The Master of the Mine		Yes
1914	Ghosts	Yes	Yes
1914	Inasmuch	Yes	Yes
1914	The Face of Fear	Yes	Yes
1914	The King's Men	Yes	Yes
1914	The Beautiful Unknown		Yes
1915	The Tale of the North	Yes	Yes
1915	The Clubman's Wager	Yes	
1915	The Second in Command		Yes
1915	The Silent Voice		Yes
1915	Pennington's Choice		Yes
1915	Corner on Cotton		Yes
1915	Rosemary		Yes
1915	Terror of the Fold		Yes
1916	The Heart of Tara		Yes
1916	The Bait		Yes
1916	The Golden Boots		Yes
1916	From Broadway to a Throne		Yes
1919	The False Faces	Yes	
1920	The Veiled Mystery		Yes
1920	The Invisible Hand		Yes
1921	The Avenging Arrow		Yes
1921	Walter Finds a Father		Yes
1921	Walter's Winning Ways		Yes
