= Treasure Island (play) =

1915 play by Jules Eckert Goodman

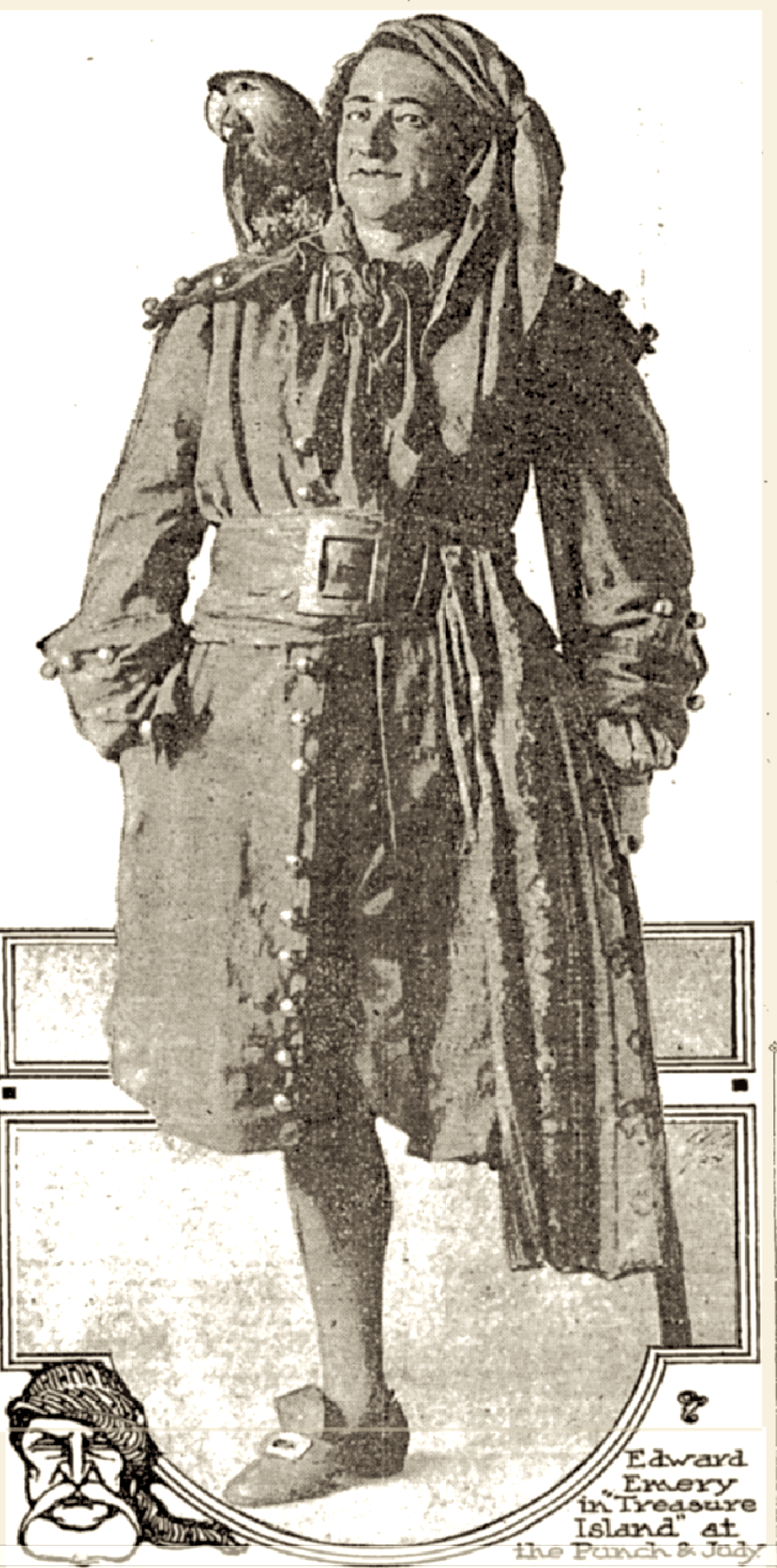
Edward Emery as Long John Silver.

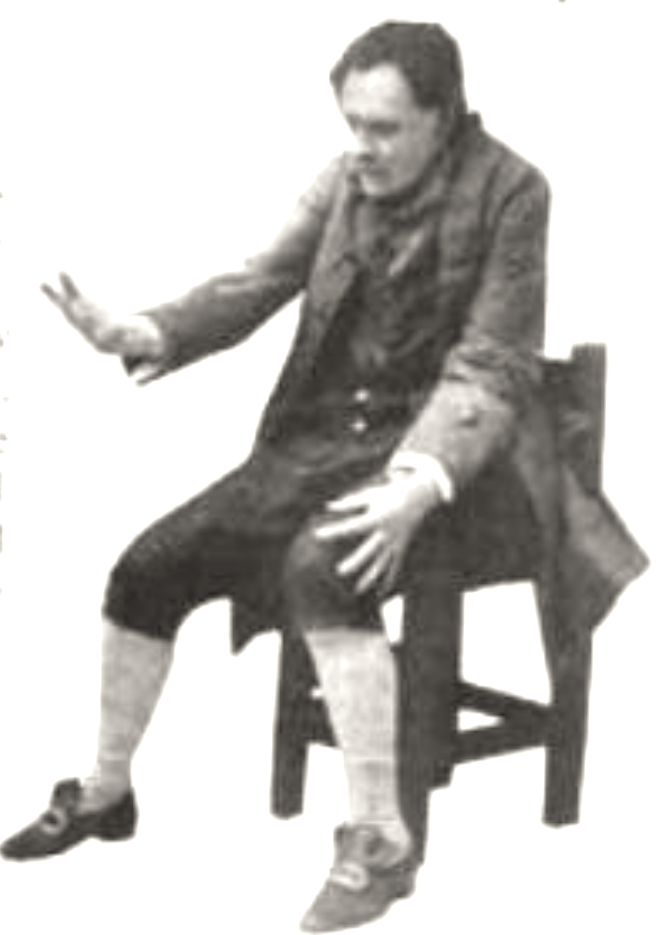
Tim Murphy as Bill Bones in the 1915 Broadway play Treasure Island.

Treasure Island is a play in four acts and ten scenes by Jules Eckert Goodman that is based on Robert Louis Stevenson's 1883 novel of the same name. It was first published in 1915 by Samuel French, Inc., and was later included in the children's play anthology Another Treasury of Plays for Children (1926, Little, Brown and Company) which was edited by Montrose Jonas Moses. While not the first stage adaptation of Stevenson's novel, it was the first adaptation to achieve critical and commercial success; bringing both "fame and fortune" to its author.

== Production history ==
Treasure Island premiered in Albany, New York at Hermanus Bleecker Hall on November 8, 1915. The production moved to Broadway where it debuted at the Punch & Judy Theatre on December 1, 1915. A hit, the play continued to run at that theater until May 27, 1916. The play was produced by the owner of the Punch and Judy Theatre, Charles Hopkins, and co-directed by Hopkins and Edward Emery. Maurice Rumsey, the show's musical director, contributed some original music, but mainly adapted, arranged, and conducted pre-existing music by other composers for the show such as Camille Saint-Saëns's Danse macabre. The costumes were designed by Ruth Vivian, and the wigs were designed by Coyle and Deutschmann.

The original cast of Treasure Island was led by Mrs. Charles Hopkins (1886-1960), the wife of the director and producer, who played the role of Jim Hawkins. Charles also appeared in the play in the role of Ben Gunn. The show's other director, Edward Emery, played the lead villain, the pirate Long John Silver. Other original cast members included Leonard Willey as Captain Alexander Smollett, David Glassford as Dr. Livesey, Edmund Gurney as Squire Trelawney, and Tim Murphy as Billy Bones among others.

After the Broadway production closed, the play was performed regionally in the United States in stock theatre. It later became a work used by junior high and high school drama programs in the United States after its publication in Another Treasury of Plays for Children in 1926. It was also very popular with amateur community theatre. It was revived at the New York Hippodrome in 1938 in a production directed by William Rathburn. The play was mounted at the Theatre Royal Stratford East in London in December 1950 through January 1951 with Michael Logan as Long John Silver and Anna Wing as Mrs. Hawkins.
