= Voice of Silence =

Voice of Silence may refer to:

- Voice of Silence (1953 film), an Italian movie directed by Georg Wilhelm Pabst
- Voice of Silence (2013 film), an Iranian movie directed by Mohammad Hadi Naeiji
- Voice of Silence (2020 film), a South Korean film directed by Hong Eui-jeong

== See also ==
- The Voice of the Silence, an 1889 book by Helena Petrovna Blavatsky
- Silent Voices (disambiguation)
