= The Avenging Arrow =

1921 film

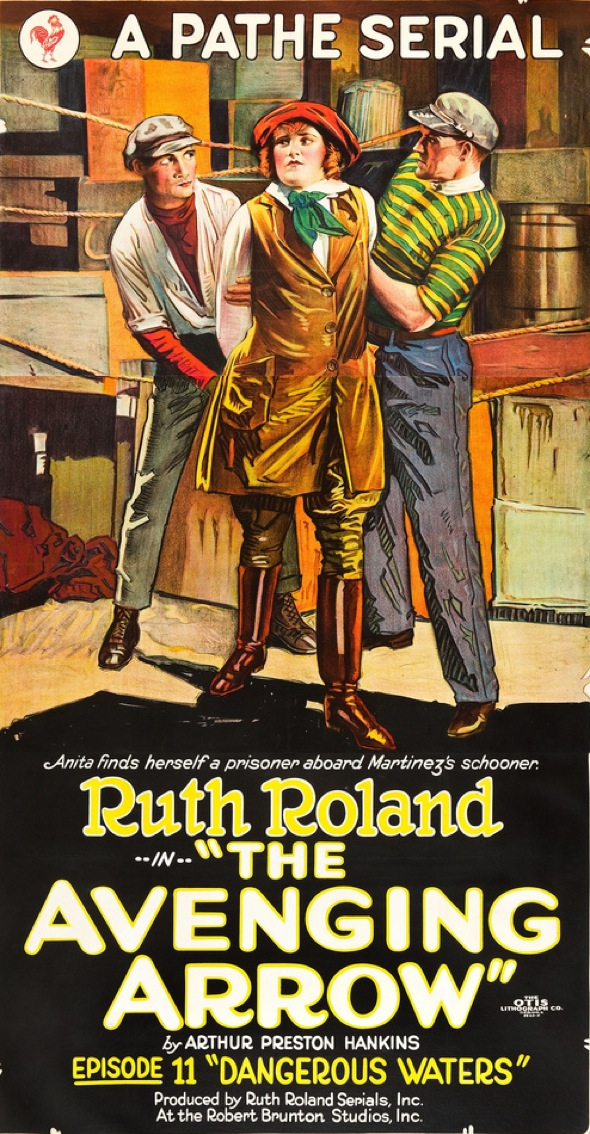
- A poster for episode 11
- Directed by: William Bowman; W. S. Van Dyke
- Written by: Jack Cunningham
- Story by: Ben B. Cohen
- Based on: The Honeymoon Quest by Arthur Preston Hankins
- Produced by: Ruth Roland Serials; Robert Brunton Studios
- Starring: Ruth Roland; Edward Hearn
- Distributed by: Pathé Exchange
- Release date: March 13, 1921
- Running time: 15 episodes
- Country: United States
- Languages: Silent; English intertitles

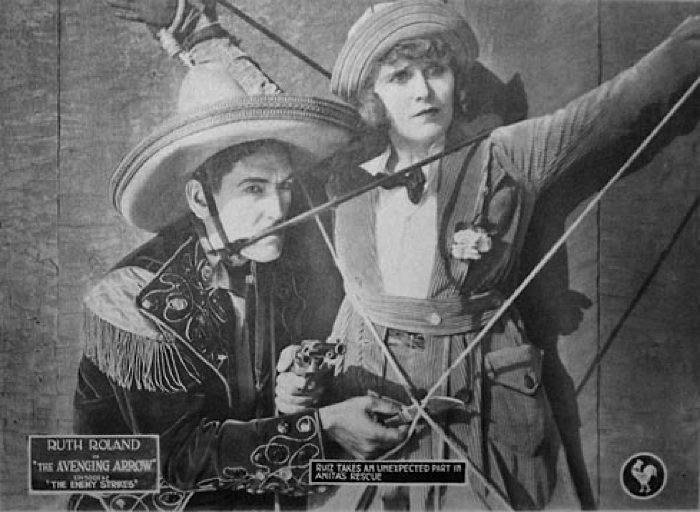
A scene from episode 2: "The Enemy Strikes."

The Avenging Arrow is a 1921 American silent Western film serial directed by William J. Bowman and W. S. Van Dyke. Its 15 episodes are now considered to be lost.

== Plot ==
=== Episodes ===
Fifteen episodes of The Avenging Arrow were released weekly from March 13 to June 19, 1921:

1. “The Vow of Mystery”
2. “The Enemy Strikes”
3. “The Hands”
4. “A Life in Jeopardy”
5. “The Message Stone”
6. “The Midnight Attack”
7. “The Double Game”
8. “The Strange Pact”
9. “The Auction Block”
10. “Outwitted”
11. “Dangerous Waters”
12. “The House of Treachery”
13. “On Perilous Grounds”
14. “Shifting Sands”
15. “The Toll of the Desert”

== Cast ==
- Ruth Roland as Anita Delgado
- Edward Hearn as Ralph Troy
- Virginia Ainsworth as Luiza Traganza
- S.E. Jennings as Don Jose Delgado
- William Steele as Don Carlos Martinez
- Chief "Big Tree" as Modoc
- Frank Lackteen as Pablo
- James Robert Chandler as The Hermit (as Robert Chandler)
- Otto Lederer as Joaquin Ruiz
- Vera Sisson as White Faun

== See also ==
- List of American films of 1921
- List of film serials
- List of film serials by studio
- List of lost films
