= Seventh Heaven (play) =

1922-24 Broadway play

- Original language: English
- Written by: Austin Strong
- Characters: Diane; Chico
- Setting: Paris and Heaven

Seventh Heaven was one of the most popular Broadway plays of the 1920s.

== Production ==
Seventh Heaven was written by Austin Strong and produced by John Golden. It ran at the Booth Theatre from October 30, 1922, to July 1924 for a total of 704 performances. The leads were played by George Gaul as Chico and Helen Menken as Diane. Also in the cast of the play was Frank Morgan as Brissac.

== Cast ==
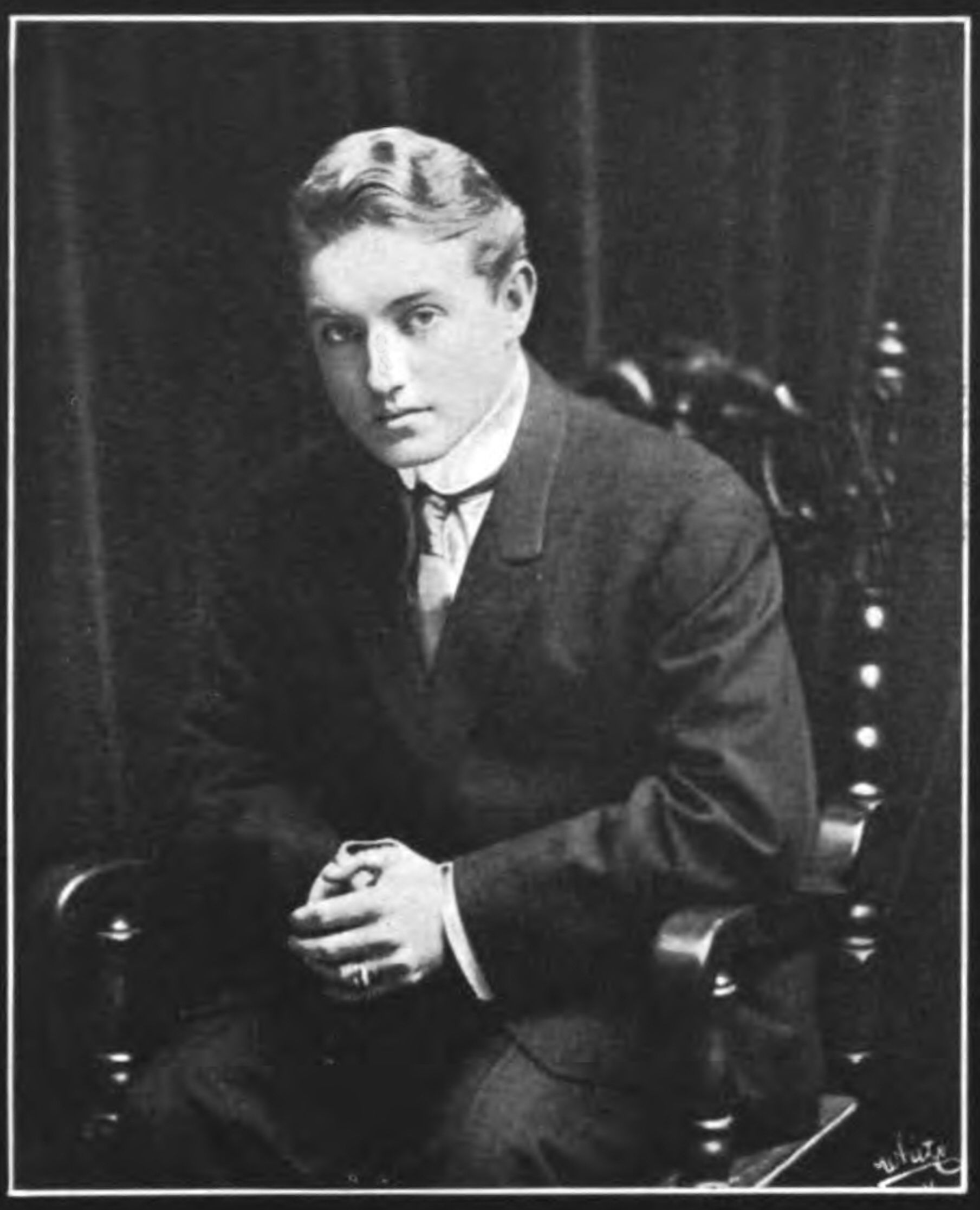
Alfred Kappeler in 1908

- Helen Menken as Diane
- George Gaul as Chico
- Frank Morgan as Brissac
- Herbert Druce as Boul'
- Alfred Kappeler as Maximalian Gobin
- Marion Kerby as Nana
- William Post as Pere Chevillon
- Isabel West as Aunt Valentine
- Harry Forsman as Uncle Georges
- Fred Holloway as The Rat
- Beatrice Noyes as Arlette
- Bernard Thornton as Recan
- Lionel Joseph as Lamplighter
- Richard Carlyle as Blonde
- John Clements as Sergeant of Police

== Plot ==
Young girl Diane is falling in love with Chico during World War I in France.

== Adaptations ==
Two films have been made based on the original Broadway play. A 1927 silent film of the same title based on Strong's play was adapted for the screen by Benjamin Glazer and directed by Frank Borzage. A 1937 remake was produced as a sound film starring Simone Simon, James Stewart, Jean Hersholt, and Gregory Ratoff, with Henry King directing.

In 1955 the musical adaptation Seventh Heaven opened on Broadway starring Gloria DeHaven, Ricardo Montalbán and Kurt Kasznar. Bea Arthur, Chita Rivera and Gerrianne Raphael were also in the cast. It ran for only 44 performances.
