= Pennington's Choice =

1915 film by William Bowman

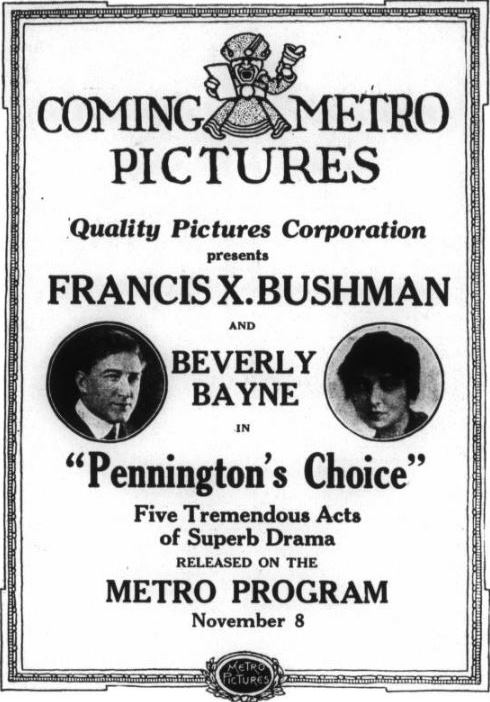
- Advertisement
- Directed by: William Bowman
- Written by: John C. Culley (is Johnston McCulley)
- Produced by: O. A. C. Lund; Fred J. Balshofer
- Starring: Francis X. Bushman
- Production company: Quality Pictures Corporation
- Distributed by: Metro Pictures
- Release date: November 8, 1915
- Running time: 5 reels
- Country: United States
- Language: Silent (English intertitles)

Pennington's Choice is a 1915 American silent drama film directed by William Bowman and starring Francis X. Bushman and Beverly Bayne a popular film acting team of the era. It was distributed by Metro Pictures.

In audio recordings made in the early 1960s, Bushman talks about the making of and success of this film.

A copy donated by the MGM survives at George Eastman House Motion Picture Collection Rochester New York.

== Cast ==
- Francis X. Bushman as Robert Pennington
- Wellington Playter as Jules Blondeau
- H. O'Dell as Louis Blondeau
- William Farris as Roland Blondeau
- Beverly Bayne as Eugenia Blondeau / Marie Blondeau
- Helen Dunbar as Mrs. Allison
- Lester Cuneo as Jean
- Morris Cytron as Pierre
- Jim Jeffries as himself (credited as J.J. Jeffries)
- Gibson Gowland as Mountain Man (uncredited)
- Arthur Housman as Mountain Man (uncredited)
