= The Beautiful Liar (film) =

1921 film

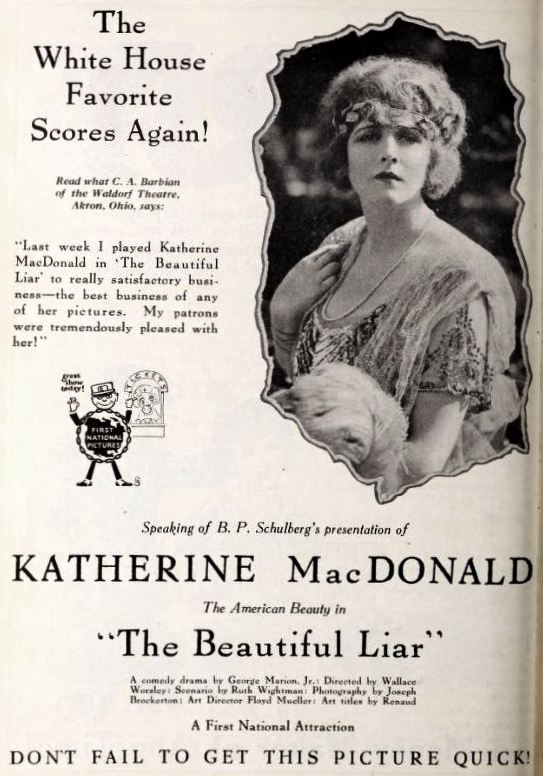
- Advertisement
- Directed by: Wallace Worsley
- Screenplay by: Ruth Wightman
- Based on: Peachie by George Marion Jr.
- Starring: Katherine MacDonald; Charles Meredith; Joseph J. Dowling; Kate Lester; Wilfred Lucas
- Cinematography: Joseph Brotherton
- Production company: Preferred Pictures
- Distributed by: Associated First National Pictures
- Release date: December 26, 1921
- Running time: 50 minutes
- Country: United States
- Languages: Silent; English intertitles

The Beautiful Liar is a 1921 American comedy film directed by Wallace Worsley and written by Ruth Wightman. The film stars Katherine MacDonald, Charles Meredith, Joseph J. Dowling, Kate Lester, and Wilfred Lucas. The film was released on December 26, 1921, by Associated First National Pictures.

== Cast ==
- Katherine MacDonald as Helen Haynes / Elsie Parmelee
- Charles Meredith as Bobby Bates
- Joseph J. Dowling as MacGregor
- Kate Lester as Mrs. Van Courtlandt-Van Allstyn
- Wilfred Lucas as Gaston Allegretti
