= The Invisible Hand (serial) =

1920 American silent film serial

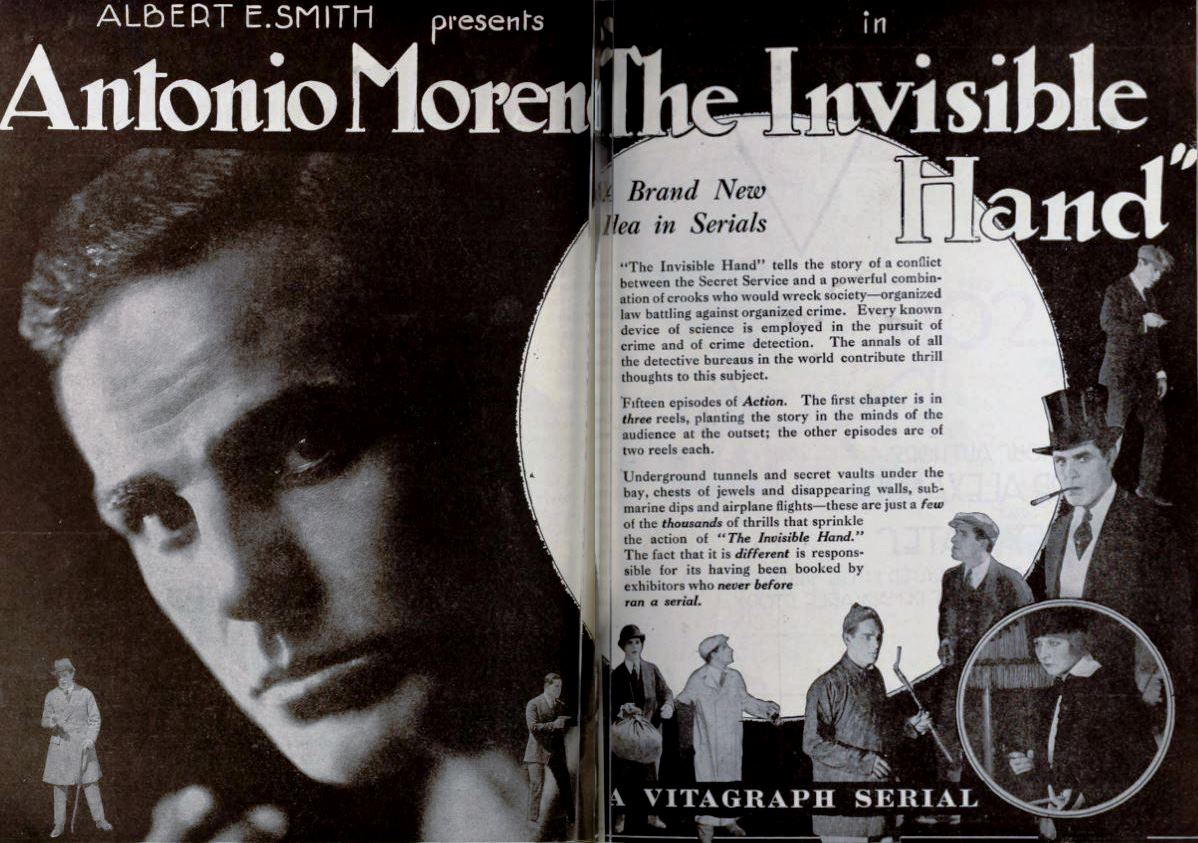
- Advertisement for The Invisible Hand, on pages 22 and 23 of the February 7, 1920 Exhibitors Herald.
- Directed by: William Bowman
- Written by: C. Graham Baker (as Graham Baker)
- Story by: Cyrus Townsend Brady; Albert E. Smith
- Starring: Antonio Moreno; Pauline Curley; Jay Morley; Brinsley Shaw
- Cinematography: Park Ries
- Production company: Vitagraph Company of America
- Distributed by: Vitagraph Company of America
- Release date: January 1920
- Running time: 15 chapters
- Country: United States
- Languages: Silent; English intertitles

The Invisible Hand is a 1920 American silent Western film serial directed by William Bowman and starring Antonio Moreno, Pauline Curley, Jay Morley, and Brinsley Shaw. The film was released by Vitagraph Company of America in January 1920.

== Cast ==
- Antonio Moreno as John 'The Needle' Sharpe
- Pauline Curley as Ann Crawford aka Violet 'X' Ray
- Jay Morley as Burnett, Chief of the Secret Service
- Brinsley Shaw as The Iron Hand
- George Mellcrest as Potsdam
- Sam Polo as Red Black
- Gordon Sackville
- Charles Rich

== Chapter titles ==
1. Setting the Snare
2. TNT
3. Winged Death
4. Gassed
5. Dodging Disaster
6. The Closing Jaw
7. The Submarine Cave
8. Outwitted
9. A Heathen Sacrifice
10. Fender of Flesh
11. Flirting with Death
12. Dungeon of Despair
13. Plunging Peril
14. A Modern Mazeppa
15. Closing the Net

== Preservation ==
Like most silent film serials, this film is now considered lost.
