= George Gaul =

American actor

- Born: September 22, 1885; Philadelphia, Pennsylvania
- Died: October 6, 1939 (aged 54)
- Occupation: Actor
- Years active: 1909-1932

George Gaul (September 22, 1885 – October 6, 1939) was an American stage actor in the first half of the 20th century. As far as is known Gaul never appeared in motion pictures but was one America's most successful stage actors in the 1920s. He was born in Philadelphia to John Gall and his wife Rebecca (née Baxter). He was educated at Lawrenceville Preparatory School in Lawrenceville, New Jersey and made his Broadway debut in 1909. Over the course of his career he toured with Billie Burke, Otis Skinner and Charles Coburn. In the 1920s he appeared in the Theatre Guild's The S.S. Tenacity and Back to Methuselah. He's best remembered for originating the part of Chico in the original Broadway production of Seventh Heaven in 1922. One of his last plays was Eugene O'Neill's Dynamo (1929). Gaul made his last stage appearance in 1932.

== Select theatre credits ==
- The Richest Girl (1909)
- The Silent Voice (1914)
- Seventeen (1918)
- Jonathan Makes a Wish (1918)
- The Ouija Board (1920)
- The Lady of the Lamp (1920)
- The S.S. Tenacity (1922)
- Seventh Heaven (1922)
- Aloma of the South Seas (1925)
- Faust (1928)
- Troilus and Cressida (1932)
