= The Penalty (1920 film) =

1920 film

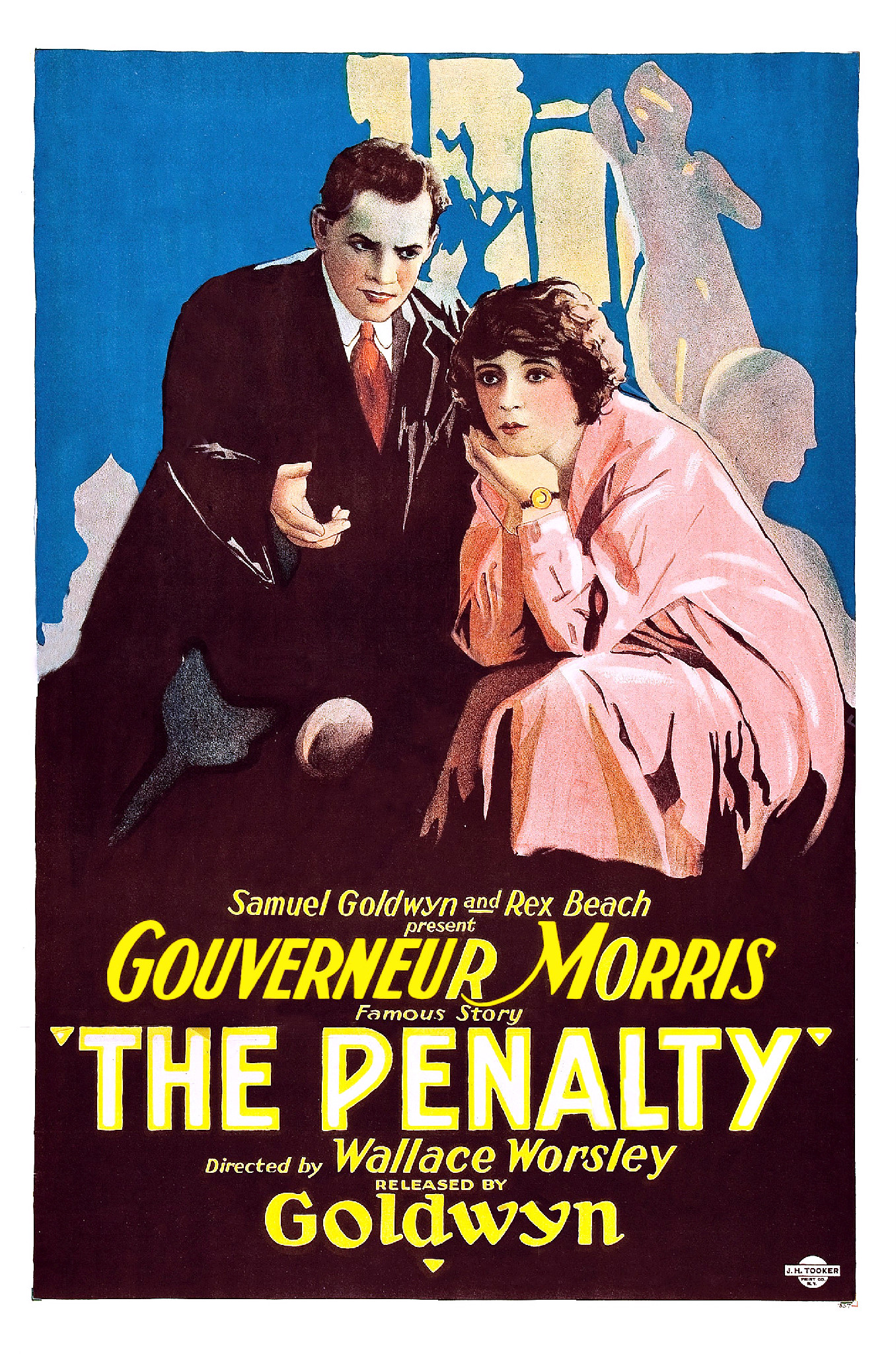
- Original release poster. The Penalty was originally a sole Goldwyn production in 1920 and was rereleased by MGM in the late 1920s.
- Directed by: Wallace Worsley
- Written by: Charles Kenyon; Philip Lonergan
- Based on: The Penalty by Gouverneur Morris
- Produced by: Samuel Goldwyn
- Starring: Lon Chaney
- Cinematography: Donovan Short
- Edited by: Frank E. Hull; J.G. Hawks
- Distributed by: Goldwyn Pictures
- Release date: August 8, 1920
- Running time: 87 minutes
- Country: United States
- Language: Silent (English intertitles)

The Penalty is an American psychological thriller crime film starring Lon Chaney and originally released in 1920 by Goldwyn Pictures. The movie was directed by Wallace Worsley, and written by Philip Lonergan and Charles Kenyon, based upon the pulp novel by Gouverneur Morris. The supporting cast includes Charles Clary, Doris Pawn, Jim Mason, and Claire Adams. The copyright for the film was owned by Gouverneur Morris, who wrote the novel on which the film was based. The budget for the film was $88,868.00. Portions of the film were shot in San Francisco.

The Penalty was re-released to theaters in 1926 by MGM. This was the first of five films Chaney would make with director Wallace Worsley, the others being Ace of Hearts, Voices of the City, A Blind Bargain and The Hunchback of Notre Dame. The film exists in its complete form and is available on DVD. Chaney's leather stumps, crutches and costume from this film were donated to the Natural History Museum in Los Angeles, along with his famous make-up case.

== Plot ==
The Penalty

As described in a film magazine, Blizzard, the legless crime boss of the Barbary Coast underworld, is possessed of two ambitions. One is to get revenge upon Dr. Ferris, whose blunder during a childhood operation resulted in Blizzard's legs being hastily and unnecessarily amputated; the other is to rally the Reds in his organization and loot the city of San Francisco.

To accomplish one, Blizzard poses for the bust of Satan created by Ferris' daughter Barbara, whom he romances to get close to the doctor. To effect the other, he organizes the city's dance hall girls to make hats in a factory room at this house, to be the symbol of the lawbreaking hordes when they are unleashed on the city. Rose, a detective, obtains entrance to his house as director of the factory. She falls in love with Blizzard for his passion for music.

Barbara, meanwhile, learns of Blizzard's master plan: to graft her father's legs onto his stumps. During the operation, however, Blizzard sees with a clear vision his fearful, terrible past, which falls away as if a dream. When happiness comes in his marriage to Rose, his former confederate Frisco Pete, a drug addict fearful that Blizzard will reveal the identity of his gang of followers, kills him. Barbara and her lover are restored to one another.

== Cast ==
Billed

- Charles Clary as Dr. Ferris
- Doris Pawn as Barbara Nell
- James Mason as Frisco Pete
- Lon Chaney as Blizzard
- Milton Ross as Lichtenstein
- Ethel Grey Terry as Rose
- Kenneth Harlan as Dr. Wilmot
- Claire Adams as Barbara Ferris

Unbilled

- Montgomery Carlyle as A Crook
- Cesare Gravina as Art Teacher
- Lee Phelps as Policeman
- Madlaine Traverse as Woman
- Edouard Trebaol as Bubbles
- Clarence Wilson as A Crook
- Wilson Hummel

== Production ==
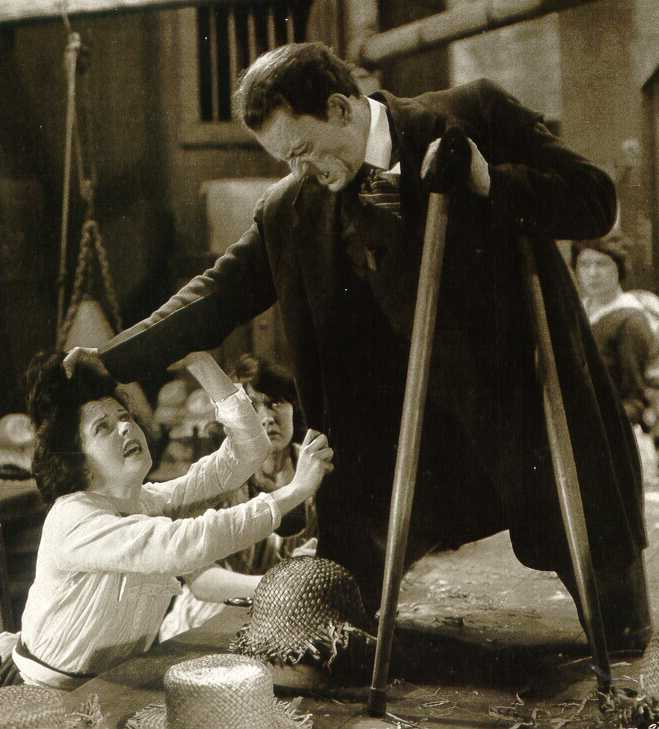
Lon Chaney in The Penalty

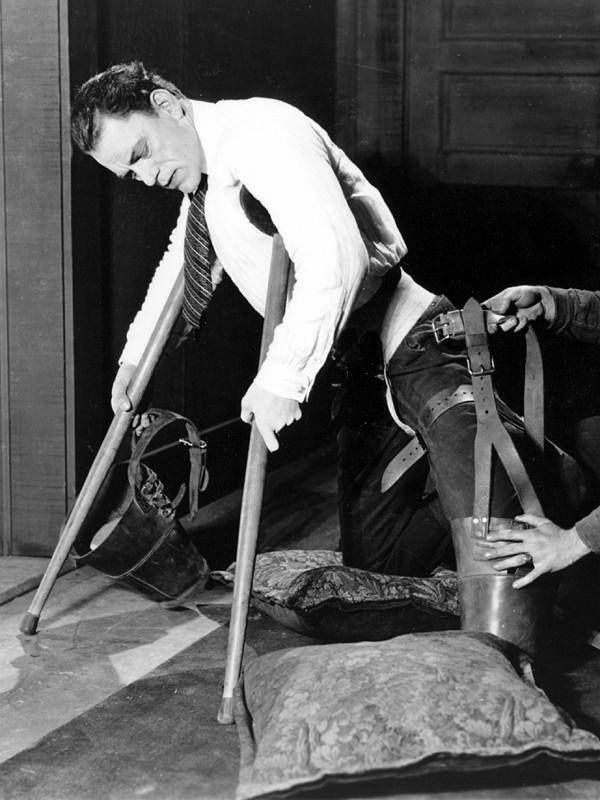
Lon Chaney preparing for the scene.

To play the role of the legless cripple, Chaney wore an apparatus to simulate amputated legs, which consisted primarily of two wooden buckets and multiple leather straps, was complex and incredibly painful. Chaney's knees sat in the buckets, while his lower legs were tied back. Studio doctors asked that Chaney not wear the device, but he insisted on doing so, so that his costume would be authentic.

To assure audiences that Chaney was not an amputee, the original release of the film reportedly included a short epilogue clip showing Chaney out of character. This clip does not survive in the existing prints but in the movie itself, in the scene where Blizzard (Chaney) imagines his gang of anarchists carrying the loot from the Mint Building, Chaney can be seen directing the heist unamputated.

== Reception ==
"Hats off to Lon Chaney! As "Blizzard" ... he gives one of the screen's greatest performances. However, up to almost the very conclusion the gripping melodramatic incidents hold securely and Chaney's work is so unusually fine, it will probably hold the production for all that is necessary."—The Wid's Film Daily

"Lon Chaney, whose work in The Miracle Man won so much praise, portrays a role that might have been written for him. He is wicked and cunning, but in the end he wins sympathy and applause. Chaney makes splendid use of every opportunity."—The Moving Picture World

"It is needless to say that the picture is Chaney more than any one else...The continuity is not always smooth, the action not always sustained. Episodes are often too racy to suit the intelligence of the picture patron. But there is no denying that the feature is interesting."—Variety

"Here is a picture that is about as cheerful as a hanging---and as interesting. You can't, being an average human and normal as to your emotional reactions, really like The Penalty, any more than you could enjoy a hanging. But for all its gruesome detail you are quite certain to be interested in it... It is a remarkably good performance this actor (Chaney) gives."—Photoplay

"One of the striking things about the picture is the remarkable characterization given by Lon Chaney, who has the leading character... Rarely has the screen seen a better piece of acting."—Exhibitors Trade Review

On Rotten Tomatoes, the film holds an approval rating of 83% based on 6 reviews, with a weighted average rating of 7.3/10.

== Preservation ==
Prints of The Penalty are in the George Eastman Museum Motion Picture Collection, the Museum of Modern Art in New York City and the Turner Film Library. It is available on DVD as well.

== Legacy ==
The Penalty was one of Chaney's breakout roles, showcasing his taste for the macabre and talent for contortion and disguise. He had previously demonstrated similar qualities in the previous year's The Miracle Man, but The Penalty and Treasure Island, both of 1920, secured Chaney's place as one of America's most famous character actors, before moving on to his more famous roles in 1923's The Hunchback of Notre Dame and 1925's The Phantom of the Opera. In 2009, Empire named it #17 in a poll of the 20 Greatest Gangster Movies You've Never Seen *Probably.

== Modern score ==
The Penalty was shown at the Hippodrome Silent Film Festival in March 2018 accompanied by a newly commissioned score by Scottish composer Graeme Stephen for guitar (Stephen) and cello (Pete Harvey).
