= The Silent Voice (play) =

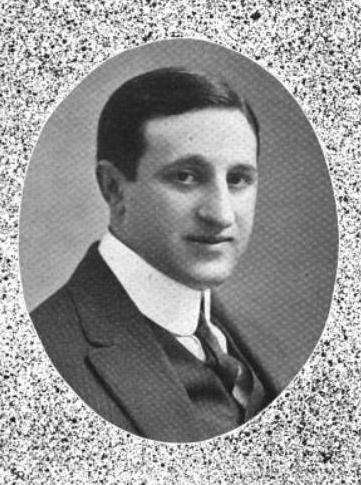
Jules Eckert Goodman, c. 1916

The Silent Voice is a four-act play by Jules Eckert Goodman adapted from the short story The Man Who Played God by Gouverneur Morris. The play was produced by Charles Frohman and made its Broadway debut at the Liberty Theatre on December 29, 1914. The Silent Voice closed on March 19, 1915 after a run of 71 performances and later was taken on tour. Morris’ story also served as the basis for four motion pictures produced between 1915 and 1955.

== Original Broadway cast ==
- Wade Boteler as Williamson
- Esther Cornell as Young Girl
- Winona Dennison as Old Woman
- Ruth Farnum as Jennie
- Florence Fisher as Marjorie Blair
- George Gaul as Bobby De Lorme
- Philip Leigh as Billy
- Owen Meech as Spring
- Walter F. Scott as Old Man
- Otis Skinner as Montgomery Starr
- Mrs. Otis Skinner (Maud Durbin) as Mildred Hallam
- Harry Sothern as Young Man
- William Willson as Policeman
- Eugenie Woodward as Heloise De Lorme

== Plot ==
The Silent Voice tells the story of Montgomery Starr, an amateur musician of means, who becomes embittered after the loss of his hearing and the discovery that his young wife married him out of a sense of duty and that her true love was his nephew Bobby. Feeling dejected, Starr retreats to the roof of his mansion where, with the aid of binoculars, he spends his time watching people in a nearby park. An accomplished lip reader, Starr soon realizes that others were as unhappy as he and that he had the means to help some of those in want. To this end, Starr employs his valet to deliver the necessary aid. Eventually Starr's disposition improves, and by the end of the play, reconciles with his wife after his binoculars enabled him to observe her reject Bobby's request to elope.

== See also ==
- The Silent Voice
- The Man Who Played God
- Sincerely Yours
