= Robert Marshall (dramatist) =

Scottish playwright

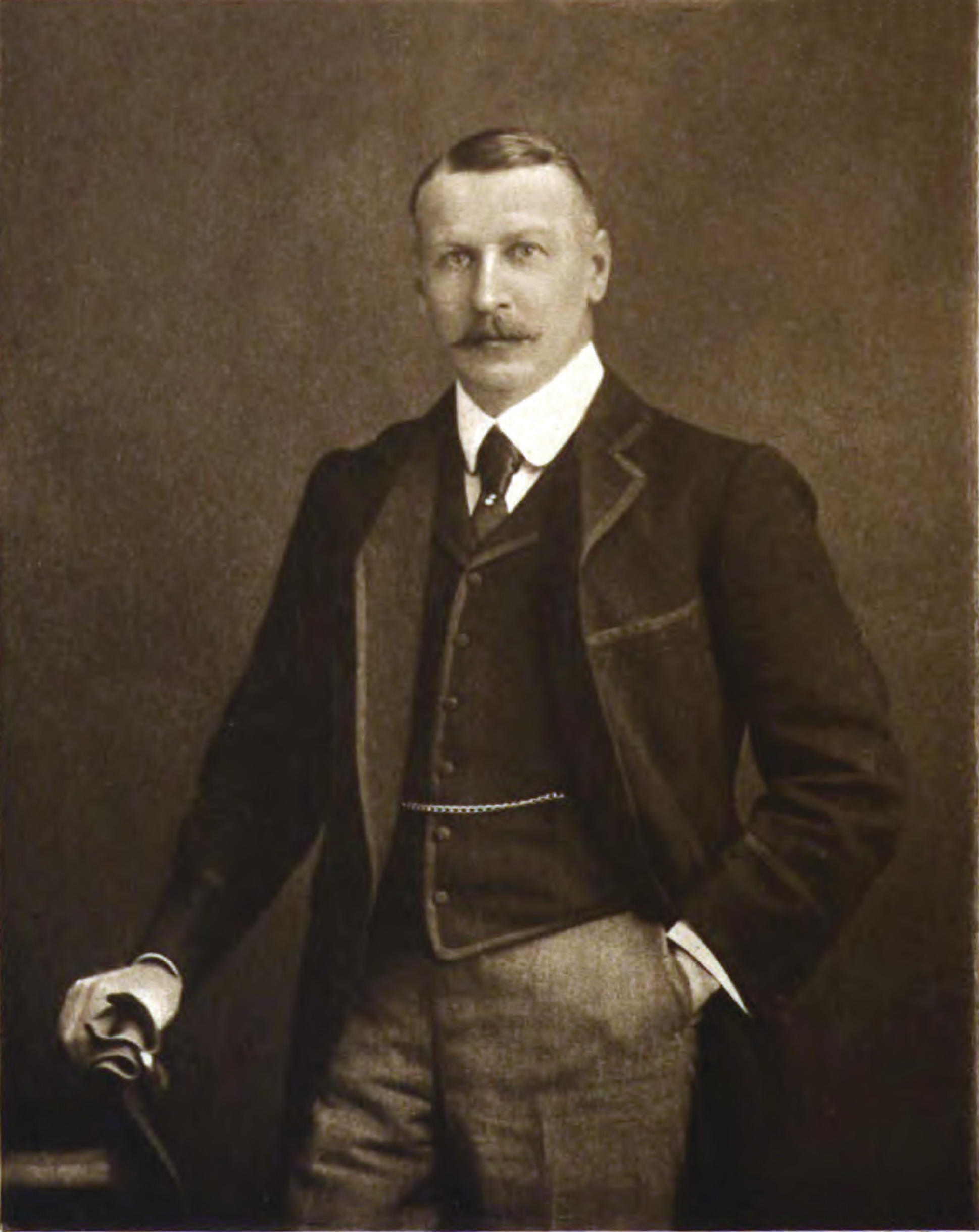
Robert Marshall c. 1900

Captain Robert Marshall (1863 – 23 July 1910) a retired army captain, was a Scottish playwright.

== Biography ==
Robert Marshall's father was a magistrate in Edinburgh, who sent his son to school in St Andrews and afterwards to the University of Edinburgh, where he read Greek, Latin and English literature. His father's death curtailed his studies and he spent some time as the articled pupil of his uncle, a solicitor but he tired of this and chose to enlist in the 71st Highland Light Infantry, his brother having graduated from Sandhurst with distinction.

After three years service in the ranks, he was given a lieutenant's commission in the Duke of Wellington's West Riding Regiment, at that time stationed in the Bermudas. While on guard duty on Agar's Island, he used his off-duty time to write his first play The Subaltern, which was produced by The Amateur Dramatic Club of Bermuda for which he also acted and painted sets.

The regiment then moved to Canada where Marshall wrote a three-act play called Strategy which was produced in Halifax, being played by a first-class company from New York. His next piece was a burlesque entitled Guy Fawkes with music composed by the regiment's band-master.

The regiment then moved to Barbados where he again had great success with Guy Fawkes. While in Barbados, he wrote a play about the Jacobite rising of 1745–1746 entitled 1746 but although it was bought by an agent, it was never produced.

In 1893, he was posted to the Cape Colony as adjutant to Sir William Gordon Cameron, a post which he held for over a year. While stationed at the Cape Town Castle, he wrote a play entitled The Great Day which was to have been produced by George Alexander but F. Pigott, the Examiner of Plays (censor), objected to it and so this never occurred. A few months later his one-act play The Shades of Night was produced at the Lyceum Theatre.

He was then posted to the Colony of Natal where he became aide-de-camp to Sir Walter Hely-Hutchinson, Governor of Natal. When his first important play His Excellency the Governor succeeded, he resigned and took playwriting as his profession. He had two other big successes, The Second in Command and The Duke of Killiecrankie. With the latter, he rescued from imminent financial disaster one of the best known managers in London. He died at the age of forty-seven.

== Works ==
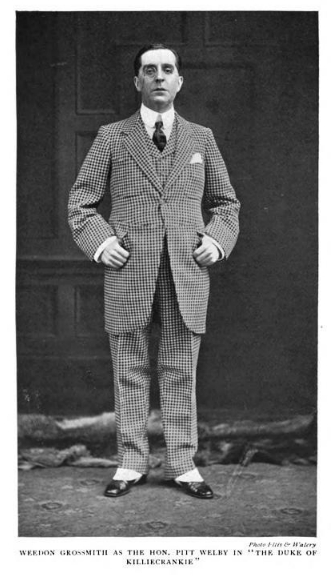
Weedon Grossmith in The Duke of Killiekrankie

- The Shades of Night (1896)
- His Excellency the Governor (1898)
- A Royal Family (1898)
- The Broad Road (1898) Terry's Theatre, London
- The Noble Lord (1900) Criterion, London
- The Second in Command (1900)
- Prince Charlie (1901) one-act play
- The Haunted Major (1902) a novel, a.k.a. The Enchanted Golf Clubs
- There's Many a Slip (1902) a translation of Bataille de Dames by Ernest Legouvé and Eugène Scribe.
- The Unforeseen (1903)
- The Duke of Killiecrankie (1904)
- Everybody's Secret (1905) with L.N. Parker, adaptation from Pierre Wolff's Le Secret de Polichinelle
- The Lady of Leeds (1905)
- The Alabaster Staircase (1906)
- The Outsider (1908)
- Second in Command (1910)
- The Second Fortune
