= Jules Eckert Goodman =

American dramatist

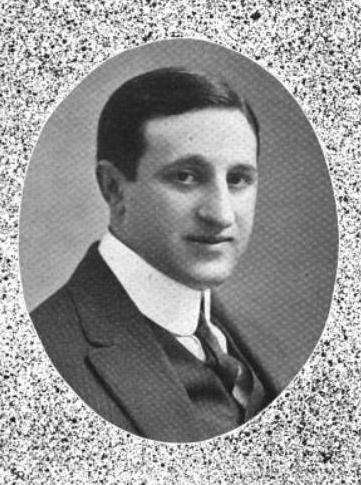
- Jules Eckert Goodman circa 1916
- Born: November 2, 1876; Gervais, Oregon, U.S.
- Died: July 10, 1962 (aged 85); Peekskill, New York, U.S.
- Education: Harvard University; Columbia University
- Occupations: Playwright; author

Jules Eckert Goodman (November 2, 1876 – July 10, 1962) was an American playwright and author. He was best known for his plays Treasure Island (1915), The Man Who Came Back (1916), The Silent Voice (1914), Chains (1923), and a series of plays featuring Potash and Permutter written with Montague Glass.

== Life and career ==
Jules Eckert Goodman was born on November 2, 1876, in Gervais, Oregon. He is one of the six children born to S. Newman and Jenette (née Rothschild) Goodman. His family was Jewish, and his mother was a native of San Francisco, California. Prior to settling in Gervais and starting a family, Jeanette had resided in Portland's Multnomah Hotel.

Goodman received an undergraduate degree from Harvard University in 1899 and a master's degree from Columbia University in 1901. He was managing editor for four years of Current Literature and also wrote for Outing and the Dramatic Mirror. He had his first success on Broadway with the 1910's Mother.

The successful The Silent Voice (1914) (derived from a short story by Gouverneur Morris) was adapted to film four times; first in 1915, then again in 1922 under the title The Man Who Played God (the title of the original Morris story). A talking-movie version also called The Man Who Played God appeared in 1932, starring George Arliss (who was also in the 1922 silent film) and Bette Davis, a role she credited as her big "break" in Hollywood. Lastly, it appeared as a campy 1955 star vehicle for Liberace called Sincerely Yours.

Goodman had tremendous success with his 1915 play Treasure Island; a work which brought him both "fame and fortune". Adapted from Robert Louis Stevenson's 1883 novel of the same name, the play was staged on Broadway at the Punch & Judy Theatre. It was a hit play of the 1915-1916 Broadway season, and later became a staple of community theatre in the United States and was also utilized by high school and middle school drama programs. Notable professional revivals included productions at the New York Hippodrome in 1938, and a 1950-1951 production at the Theatre Royal Stratford East in London.

Among other film adaptions of Goodman's work, The Man Who Came Back appeared in 1931. Goodman's reported last play Many Mansions (1937) was written with his son Eckert Goodman.

Goodman died of pneumonia in Peekskill, New York, where he had resided for forty years, on July 10, 1962. His wife died in 1959, and he was survived by one son (Jules Eckert Goodman Jr., who died in 1964, aged 55), and two daughters, Helen Goodman and Anna Freedgood.

== Selected bibliography ==
=== Plays ===
- The Man Who Stood Still (1908)
- The Right to Live (1908)
- The Test (1908)
- Mother (1910)
- The Point of View (1912)
- The Silent Voice (1914)
- The Trap (1915)
- Just Outside the Door (1915)
- Treasure Island (1915) (adaption of Robert Louis Stevenson novel)
- The Man Who Came Back (1916)
- Object - Matrimony (1916) (written with Montague Glass))
- Business Before Pleasure (1917) (written with Montague Glass)
- Why Worry? (1918)(written with Montague Glass)
- His Honor: Abe Potash (1919) (written with Montague Glass)
- Pietro (1920) (written with Maud Skinner)
- The Law Breaker (1922)
- Partners Again (1922) (written with Montague Glass)
- Chains (1923)
- Simon Called Peter (1924) (written with Edward Knoblock)
- Potash and Permutter, Detectives (1926) (with Montague Glass)
- The Great Romancer (1937)
- Many Mansions (1937) (written with his son)
- George Worthing, American (debuted 1948, written earlier)

=== Novels ===
- Mother (1911) (adapted from the play)
