= Wallace Worsley =

American actor and film director

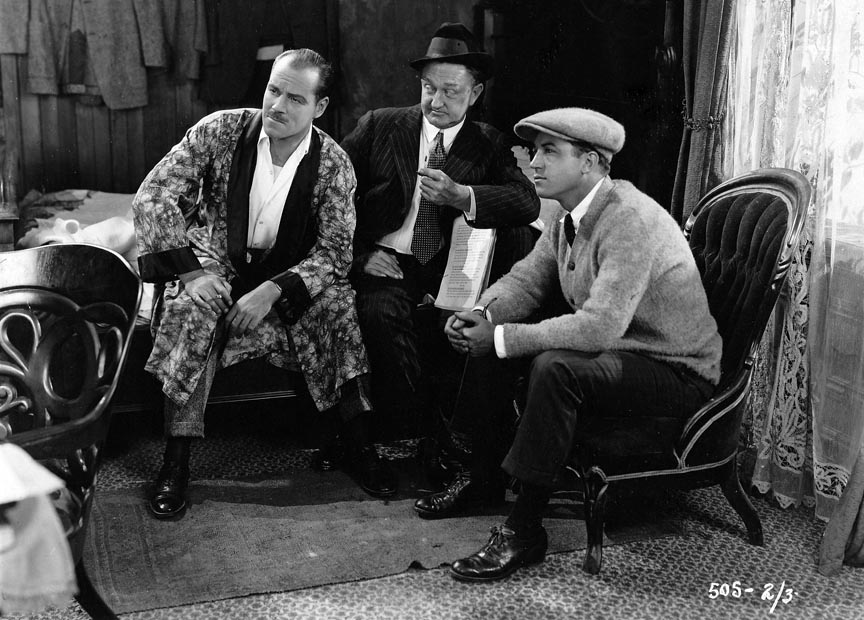
- Jack Holt, Wallace Worsley, and Charles Schoenbaum on the set of Nobody's Money (1923)
- Born: Wallace Ashley Worsley; December 8, 1878; Wappingers Falls, New York
- Died: March 26, 1944 (aged 65); Hollywood, California
- Resting place: Forest Lawn Memorial Park, Glendale
- Occupations: Stage actor, film actor, film director
- Years active: 1901–1928
- Spouse: Julia Marie Taylor (1878–1976)
- Children: Paul Brackenride Worsley; Wallace Worsley Jr.

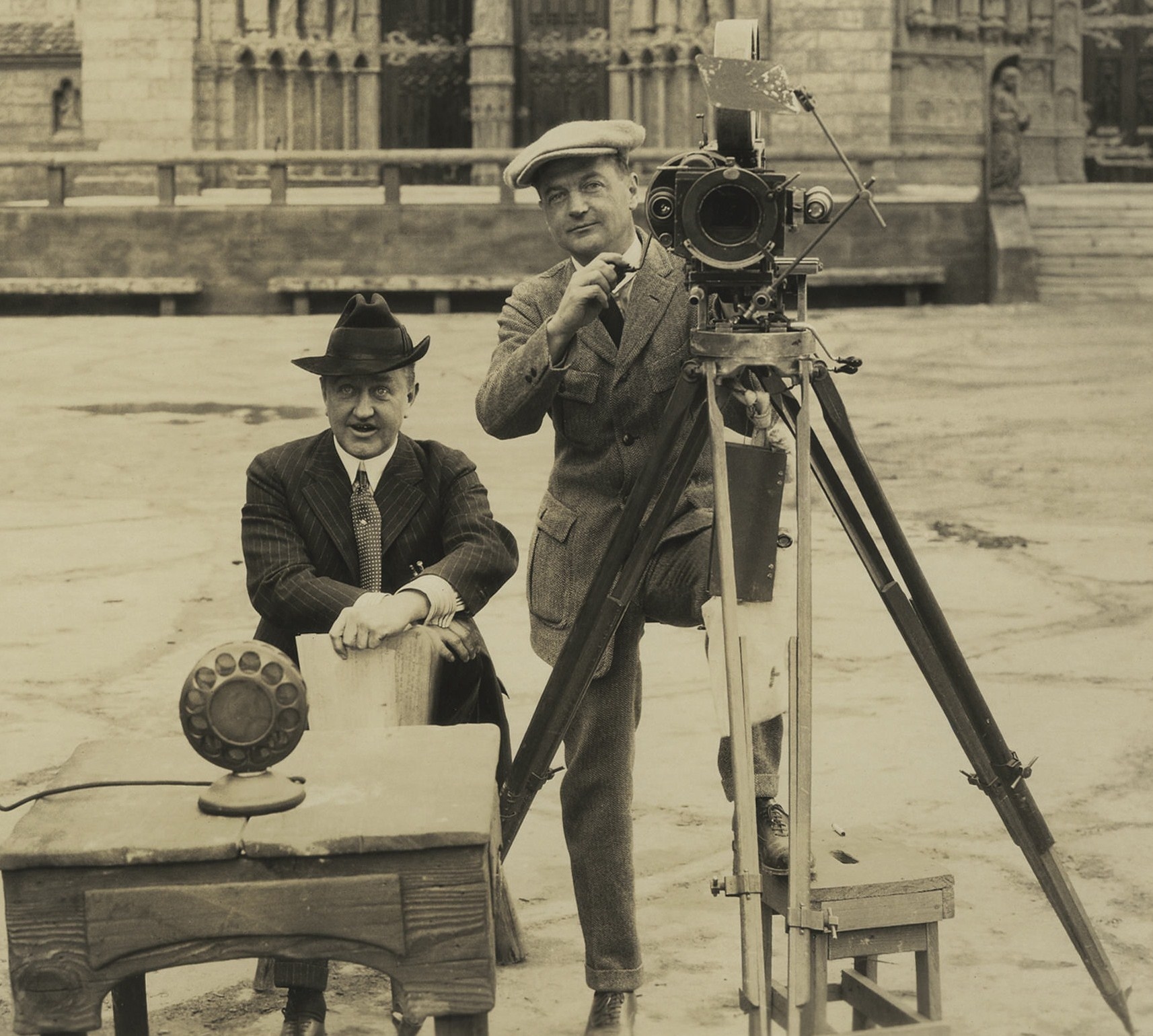
Worsley and cameraman Robert Newhard during making of The Hunchback of Notre Dame.

Wallace Ashley Worsley (December 8, 1878 – March 26, 1944) was an American stage actor who became a film actor and film director during the silent era. Over the course of his career, Worsley directed 29 films and acted in 7. He directed several movies starring Lon Chaney Sr., and his professional relationship with the actor was the best Chaney had, second to his partnership with Tod Browning.

The Hunchback of Notre Dame (1923) is one of his better-known works, along with The Penalty (1920). Worsley's 1922 horror film A Blind Bargain with Chaney is one of the more sought after lost films.

== Acting ==
In April 1901, Worsely appeared at the Empire Theatre (41st Street) as Lt. Earl of Hunstanton in a revival of Leo Trevor's comedy Brother Officers. It ran for eight performances. He followed this immediately with Diplomacy, which ran for about six weeks. Between 1903 and 1915, Worsley was in nine more plays, most of them short-lived. One play which was particularly successful was Philip Bartholomae's Over Night (1911) in which Worsley portrayed Al Rivers.

In 1916, Worsley left Broadway for Hollywood and acted for two years, then he started directing.

== The Hunchback of Notre Dame ==
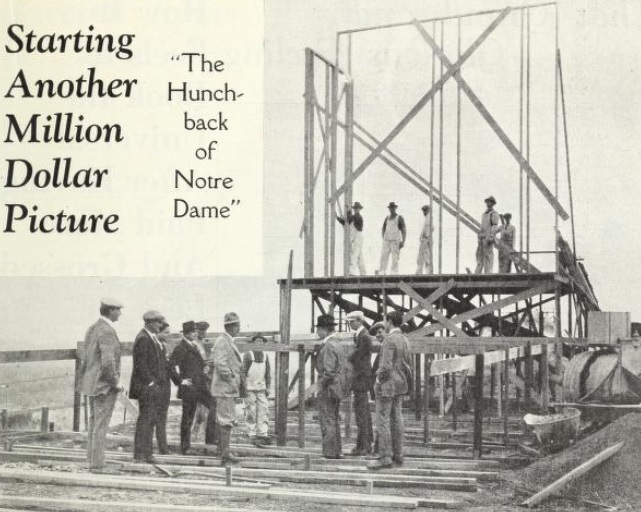
Worsley observes construction of Hunchback set 1922

This movie was to be the first big-screen adaptation of Hugo's novel and Universal's major production of 1923. Chaney owned the rights, and reportedly, his first choice for director was Erich von Stroheim. However, Irving Thalberg recently fired von Stroheim due to conflicts over Merry-Go-Round. Worsley, who had already worked on four films with Chaney, directed on loan from Paramount.

The cast of extras was so large that Worsley set aside his megaphone in favor of a radio and loudspeaker. The film was Universal's most successful silent film.

== Personal life ==
Worsley married Indiana-born actress, Julia Marie Taylor, on September 18, 1904. Among Julia's film credits is the title role of Juliet in the 1911 short Romeo and Juliet, directed by Barry O'Neil, considered to be the first attempt to distill the entire Shakespeare narrative into a single film. Together, they had two sons, Wallace Worsley Jr. (1908-1991), an assistant director and production manager, whose career spanned nearly six decades and included The Wizard of Oz and E.T. the Extra-Terrestrial, and Paul Brackenride Worsley (1920-1933). He died in 1944 at the age of 65.

== Selected filmography ==
| Year | Title | Role |
|---|---|---|
| 1917 | Borrowed Plumage | Sir Charles Broome |
| 1917 | Paws of the Bear | Curt Schrieber |
| 1917 | Alimony | John Flint |
| 1918 | A Man's Man | Henry Jenks |
| 1918 | Madam Who? | Albert Lockhart |
| 1918 | A Law Unto Herself | director |
| 1918 | The Goddess of Lost Lake | director |
| 1919 | Adele | director |
| 1919 | Diane of the Green Van | director |
| 1919 | Playthings of Passion | director |
| 1919 | A Woman of Pleasure | director |
| 1920 | The Penalty | director |
| 1921 | The Ace of Hearts | director |
| 1921 | Voices of the City | director |
| 1921 | Don't Neglect Your Wife | director |
| 1922 | A Blind Bargain | director |
| 1922 | When Husbands Deceive | director |
| 1922 | Enter Madame | director |
| 1922 | Rags to Riches | director |
| 1923 | A Man's Man | Henry Jenks |
| 1923 | Nobody's Money | director |
| 1923 | Is Divorce a Failure? | director |
| 1923 | The Hunchback of Notre Dame | director |
| 1924 | The Man Who Fights Alone | director |
| 1926 | Shadow of the Law | director |
| 1928 | The Power of Silence | director |
