= Gouverneur Morris (novelist) =

American writer

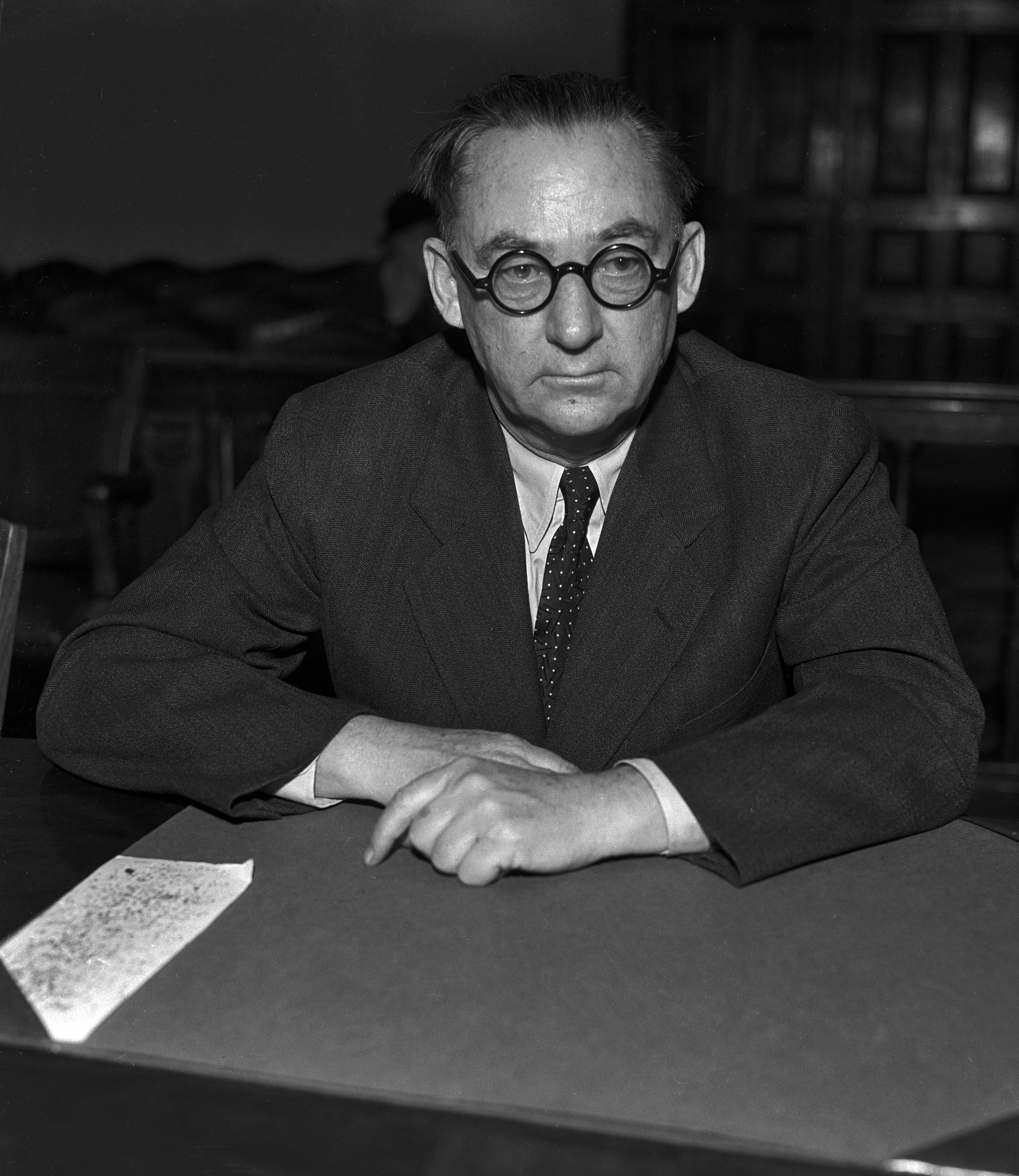
- Morris in 1931
- Born: Gouverneur Morris IV; February 7, 1876; New York, U.S.
- Died: August 14, 1953 (aged 77); Gallup, New Mexico, U.S.
- Education: Yale University
- Occupation: Writer
- Known for: The Man Who Played God (1932); The Ace of Hearts (1921); The Penalty (1920)
- Spouse: Elizabeth "Elsie" Waterbury (m. 1905–1919) Ruth Wightman (m. 1924)

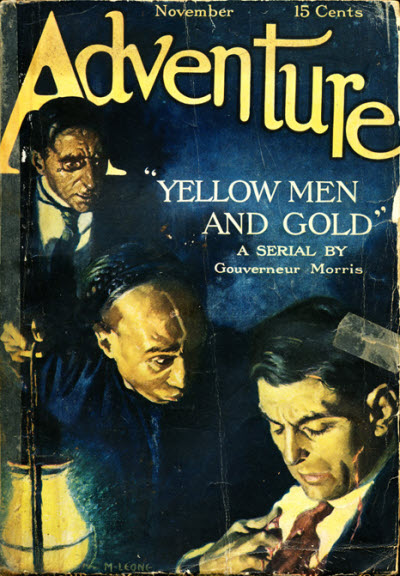
Morris's "Yellow Men and Gold" was the cover story for the first issue of Adventure in 1910

Gouverneur Morris IV (February 7, 1876 – August 14, 1953) was an American author of pulp novels and short stories during the early 20th century.

== Biography ==
Gouverneur Morris IV was born in 1876 and was a great-grandson of American Founding Father Gouverneur Morris. He graduated from Yale University, where he wrote for campus humor magazine The Yale Record.

He was a prolific novelist and short story writer, with multiple of his works adapted into films.

He worked as a war correspondent during World War I. After relocating from New York to California in 1919.

In 1905, he married Elizabeth "Elsie" Waterbury. They separated in 1919 and divorced in 1923. He married screenwriter and racecar driver Ruth Wightman that same year in Mexico, with a second ceremony in California the following year in 1924.

Wightman worked as his secretary before moving into Samuel Goldwyn Studio's scenario department, where she adapted his novels The Beautiful Liar (1921) and The Ace of Hearts (1921).

In the early 1920s, he purchased the historic home La Mirada Adobe in Monterey, California (now one of two sites for the Monterey Peninsula Museum of Art). The property was foreclosed on February 8, 1934, for $8,186.60.

He also served as director of the Monterey Bank from 1930 until his retirement.

In 1932, they moved to Manhattan Beach, where they were close to their work in the film industry.

In 1936, actress Lila Lee was staying with them in their Manhattan Beach home, when Reid Russell (a friend of Ruth's and in a relationship with Lee) was found shot on their front porch. The death was eventually ruled a suicide.

Soon after, he and Ruth moved to Coolidge, New Mexico, where they lived on a ranch owned by Charles Newcomb. He continued living there after his wife's death in 1939.

His papers are held in the Pennsylvania State University Libraries Archival Collections.

== Publications ==
Morris wrote several novels. His numerous short stories were first published in magazines, notably Cosmopolitan, Collier's, The Saturday Evening Post, Metropolitan, The Smart Set, and Harper's Bazaar, and many were collected in book form.

== Film and music ==
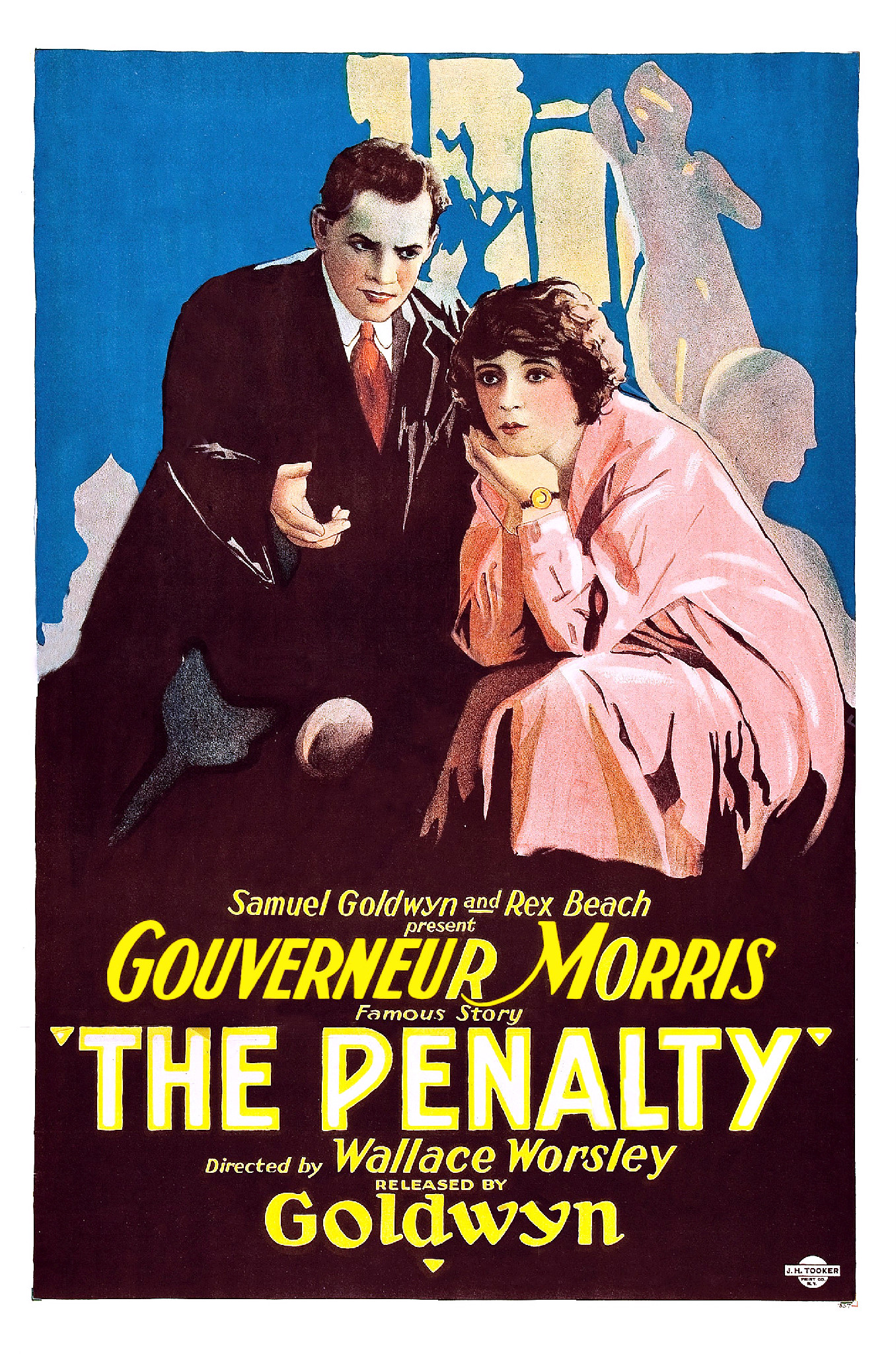
Lon Chaney, Sr. in The Penalty (1920), based on The Penalty (1913) by Gouverneur Morris

American composer Caroline Holme Walker (1863–1955) used Morris’ text for her song “Your Kiss.”

Several of his works were adapted into films, including The Penalty (1920) with Lon Chaney, Sr.

Other film adaptions of his novels include:

- The Jungle Princess (1936) with screenwriter Cyril Hume, starring Dorothy Lamour in her film debut
- East of Java (1935) with screenwriter James Ashmore Creelman, starring Frank Albertson and Charles Bickford
- The Man Who Played God (1932), starring George Arliss and Bette Davis
- The Man Who Played God (1922), starring George Arliss and Ann Forrest
- The Ace of Hearts (1921) directed by Wallace Worsley and starring Lon Chaney, Sr.
- A Tale of Two Worlds (1921), directed by Frank Lloyd and starring Wallace Beery
- Behind the Door (1919), starring Wallace Beery

== Partial bibliography ==
- Tom Beauling (1901)
- Aladdin O'Brien (1902)
- The Pagan's Progress (1904)
- Ellen and Mr. Man (1904)
- The Footprint and Other Stories (1908)
- Putting on the Screws (1909)
- The Spread Eagle and Other Stories (1910)
- The Voice in the Rice (1910)
- Yellow Men and Gold (1911)
- It, and Other Stories (1912)
- If You Touch Them They Vanish (1913)
- The Penalty (1913)
- The Incandescent Lily and Other Stories (1914)
- The Goddess (1915)
- When My Ship Comes In (1915)
- The Seven Darlings (1915)
- We Three (1916)
- His Daughter (1919)
- The Wild Goose (1919)
- Keeping the Peace (1924)
- Tiger Island (1934)
