= Valley Forge =

1777–1778 Continental Army encampment

- Part of the American Revolutionary War
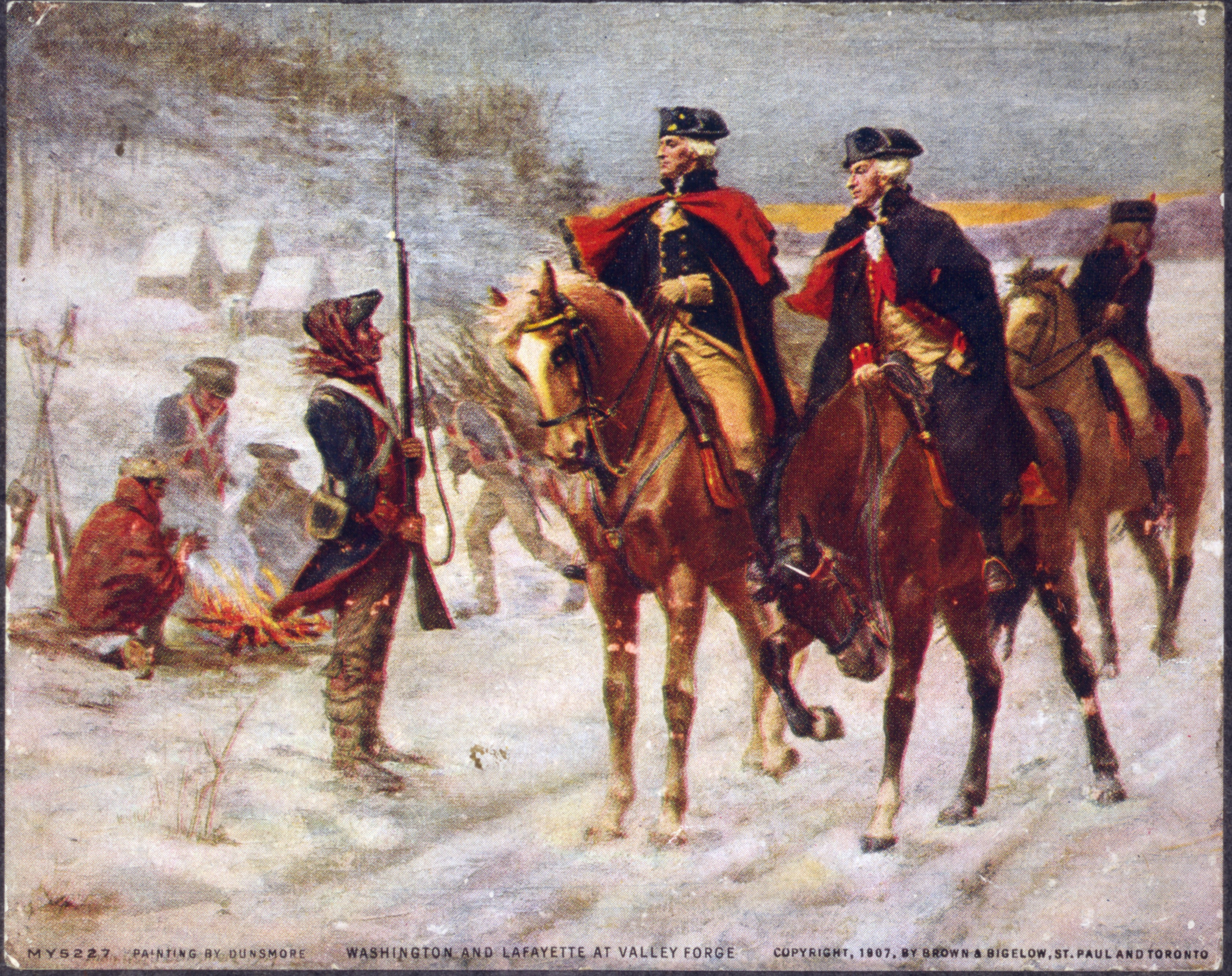
- A 1907 portrait of Washington and Lafayette at Valley Forge by John Ward Dunsmore
Date	December 19, 1777 – June 19, 1778 (6 months)
Location	Valley Forge, Pennsylvania, U.S. 40°05′49″N 75°26′20″W

Valley Forge was the winter encampment of the Continental Army, under the command of George Washington, during the Philadelphia campaign of the American Revolutionary War. The encampment, located in eastern Pennsylvania along the Schuylkill River, lasted approximately six months, from December 19, 1777, to June 19, 1778.

Three months prior to the encampment at Valley Forge, in September 1777, the Second Continental Congress was forced to flee the revolutionary capital of Philadelphia ahead of an imminent British attack on the city following Washington's defeat in the Battle of Brandywine, a decisive British victory that contributed to the British Army's goal of capturing Philadelphia. Unable to defend Philadelphia, Washington led his 12,000-man army into winter quarters at Valley Forge, located approximately 18 miles (29 km) northwest of Philadelphia.

At Valley Forge, the Continental Army struggled to manage a disastrous supply crisis while simultaneously retraining and reorganizing their units in an effort to mount successful counterattacks against the British. During the encampment at Valley Forge, an estimated 1,700 to 2,000 soldiers died from disease, possibly exacerbated by malnutrition and cold, wet weather. In 1976, in recognition of the enormous historical significance of Valley Forge in American history, Valley Forge National Historical Park was established and named a national historic site, which protects and preserves nearly 3,600 acres (1,500 ha) of the original Valley Forge encampment site. The park is a popular tourist destination, drawing nearly 2 million visitors each year.

== Pre-encampment ==
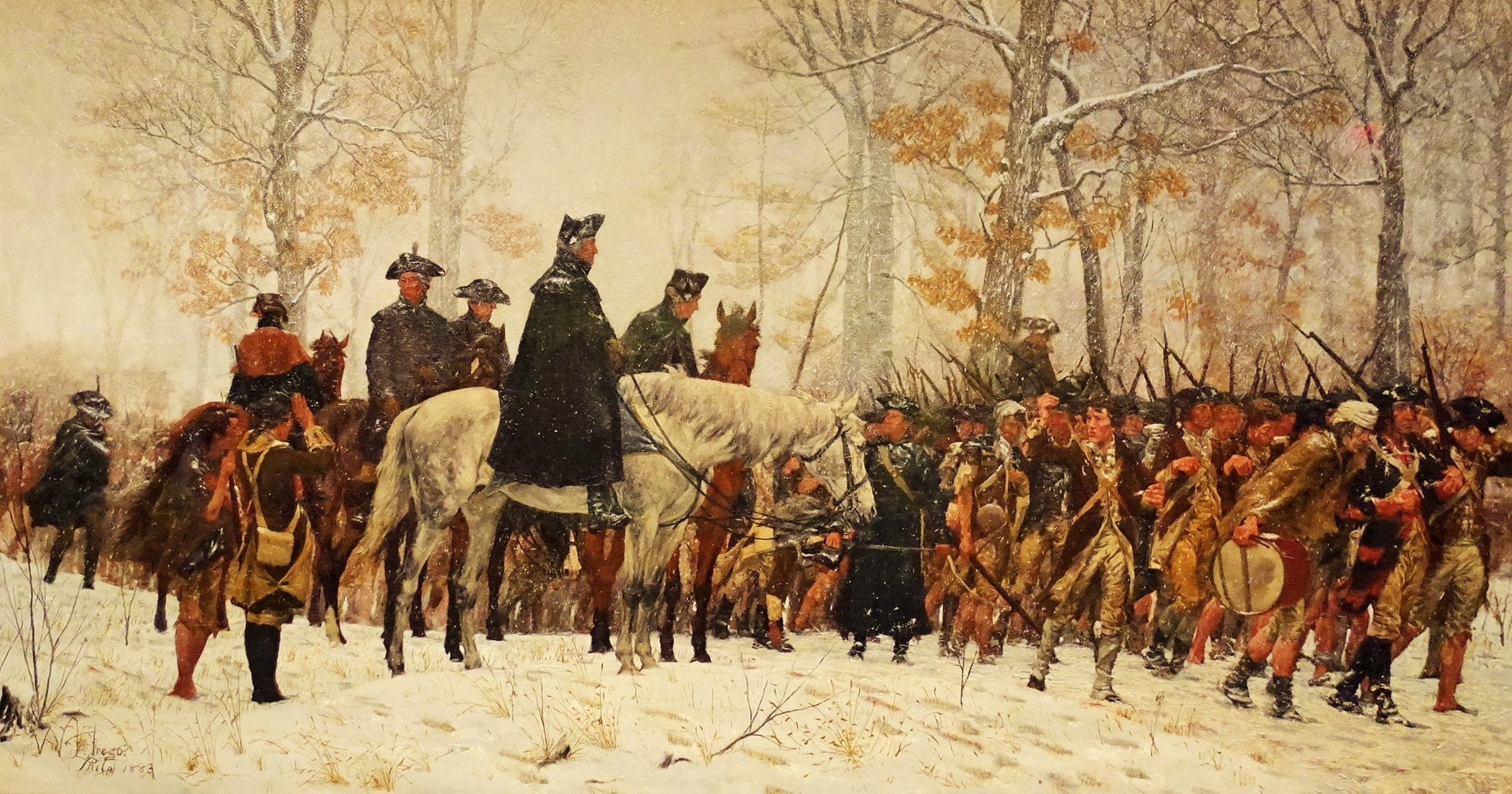
Washington on the March to Valley Forge

In 1777, Valley Forge consisted of a small proto-industrial community located at the confluence of Valley Creek and the Schuylkill River. In 1742, Quaker industrialists established the Mount Joy Iron Forge in Valley Forge. Capital improvements made by John Potts and his family over the following decades permitted the small community to expand its ironworks, establish mills, and construct new dwellings for the village's residents. Valley Forge was surrounded by rich farmland, where mainly Welsh Quaker farmers grew wheat, rye, hay, Indian corn, and other crops, and raised livestock, including cattle, sheep, pigs, and barnyard fowl. Settlers of German and Swedish descent also lived nearby.

In the summer of 1777, the Continental Army's quartermaster general, Thomas Mifflin, decided to station a portion of the Continental Army's supplies in buildings in the village because the area had a variety of structures and was a secluded location surrounded by two hills. Fearing such a concentration of military supplies would become a target for British raids, the forge's ironmaster, William Dewees Jr., expressed concerns about the army's proposal. Mifflin heeded Dewees' concerns but established a magazine at Valley Forge anyway.

=== Philadelphia campaign ===
After British forces landed at the Head of Elk in present-day Elkton, Maryland, on August 25, 1777, they maneuvered out of the Chesapeake basin and headed north as part of the Philadelphia campaign. Following the British victories at the Battle of Brandywine on September 11, 1777, and the Battle of the Clouds five days later, several hundred Hessian soldiers under General Wilhelm von Knyphausen raided the supply magazine at Valley Forge on September 18. Despite the best efforts of Lieutenant Colonel Alexander Hamilton and Captain Henry Lee III, the two Continental Army officers tasked with evacuating the supplies at Valley Forge, von Knyphausen's troops captured and burnt the magazine, taking or destroying all supplies contained within.

== Valley Forge encampment ==
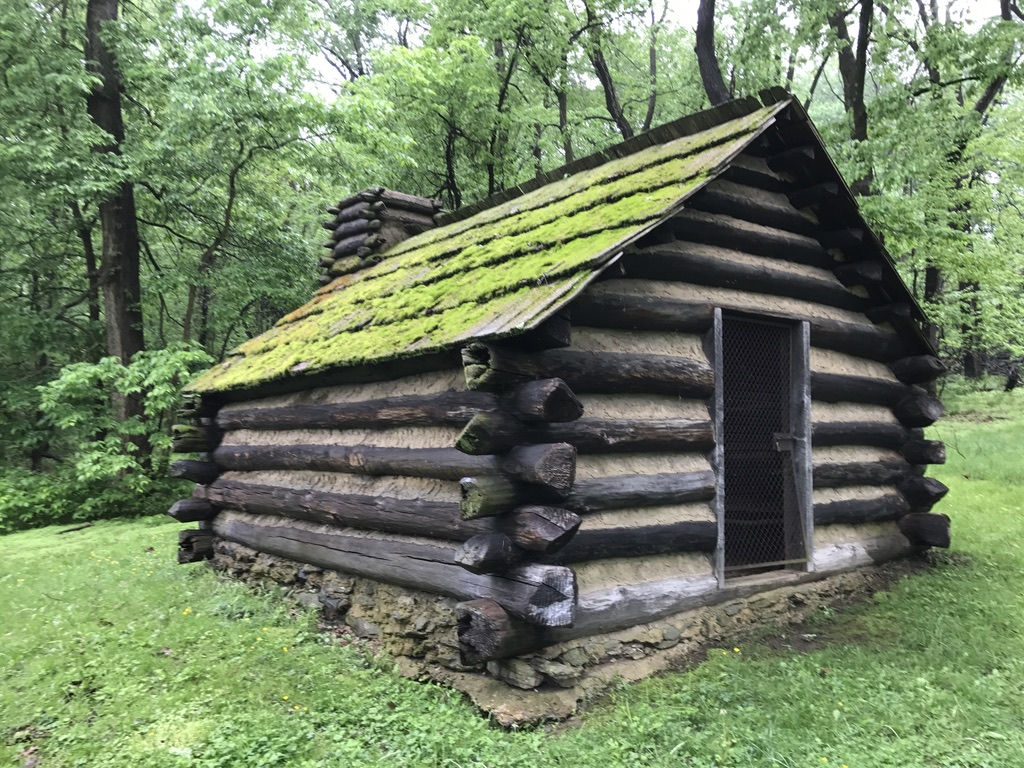
A reproduction Continental Army soldier's hut at Valley Forge

Political, strategic, and environmental factors all influenced the Continental Army's decision to establish their encampment near Valley Forge, Pennsylvania, in the winter of 1777–1778. The site was selected after George Washington conferred with his officers to select a strategic location that would prove most advantageous to the Continental Army.

=== Site selection ===
On October 29, 1777, Washington first presented his generals with the question of where to quarter the Continental Army in the winter of 1777–1778. In addition to suggestions from his officers, Washington also had to consider the recommendations of politicians. Pennsylvania state legislators and the Second Continental Congress expected the Continental Army to select an encampment site that could protect the countryside around the revolutionary capital of Philadelphia. Some members of the Continental Congress also believed that the army might be able to launch a winter campaign. Interested parties suggested other sites for an encampment, including Lancaster, Pennsylvania and Wilmington, Delaware. Following the inconclusive Battle of Whitemarsh from December 5–8, however, increasing numbers of officers and politicians began to appreciate the need to defend the greater Philadelphia region from British attack.

Considering these questions, an encampment at Valley Forge had notable advantages. Valley Forge's high terrain meant that enemy attacks would be difficult. Wide, open areas provided space for drilling and training, and its location allowed for soldiers to be readily detached to protect the countryside. On December 19, Washington conducted his 12,000-man army to Valley Forge to establish the encampment.

The encampment was primarily situated along the high, flat ground east of Mount Joy and south of the Schuylkill River. In addition to a concentration of soldiers at Valley Forge, Washington ordered nearly 2,000 soldiers to encamp at Wilmington, Delaware. He posted the army's mounted troops at Trenton, New Jersey, and additional outposts at Downingtown and Radnor, Pennsylvania, among other places. In the two winter encampments prior to Valley Forge, the Continental Army had sheltered themselves in a combination of tents, constructed huts, civilian barns and other buildings. Valley Forge marked the first time Washington ordered the Continental Army primarily to concentrate into a more permanent post, which required them to construct their own shelters. This strategic shift encouraged a whole new host of problems for the American Patriots.

=== March in and hut construction ===
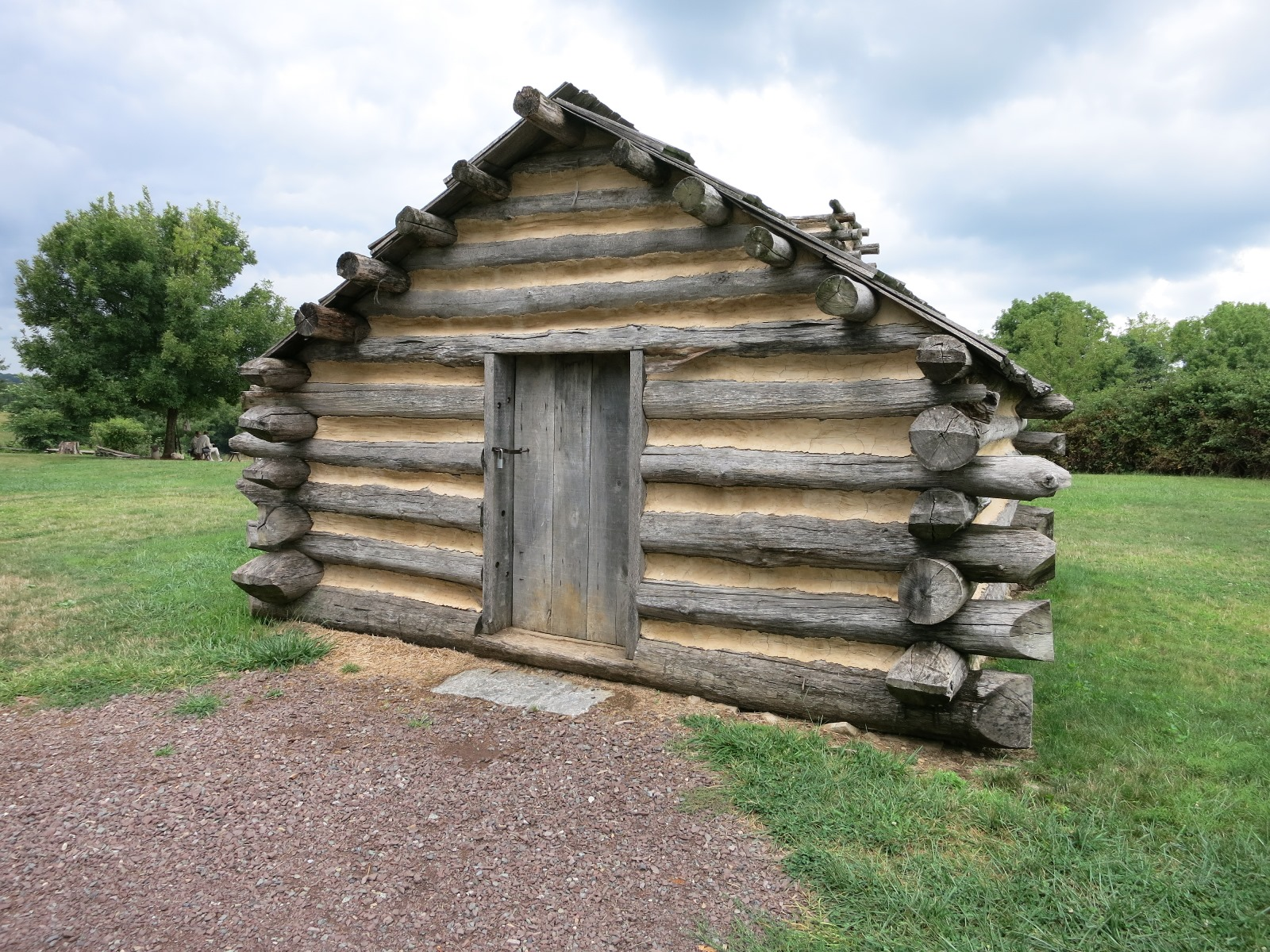
A reproduction hut at Valley Forge National Historical Park along North Outer Line Drive, where the Continental Army encamped over the harsh 1777–1778 winter

Washington later wrote of the march into Valley Forge: "To see men without clothes to cover their nakedness, without blankets to lay on, without shoes by which their marches might be traced by the blood from their feet, and almost as often without provisions as with; marching through frost and snow and at Christmas taking up their winter quarters within a day's march of the enemy, without a house or hut to cover them till they could be built, and submitting to it without a murmur is a mark of patience and obedience which in my opinion can scarce be paralleled."

The Valley Forge encampment became the Continental Army's first large-scale construction of living quarters. While no accurate account exists for the number of log huts built, experts estimate a range between 1,500 and 2,000 structures. There are no known contemporary images of the Valley Forge cantonment. The correspondence of General Washington and other soldiers’ letters and notebooks are the only accounts of what took place. Brigadier General Louis Lebègue de Presle Duportail selected grounds for the brigade encampments and planned the defenses. Afterwards, brigadier generals appointed officers from each regiment to mark out the precise spot for every officer and all enlisted men's huts.

Despite commanders' attempts at standardization, the huts varied in terms of size, materials, and construction techniques. Military historian John B. B. Trussell Jr. writes that many squads "dug their floors almost two feet [60 cm] below ground level," to reduce wind exposure or the number of logs required for construction. In addition, some huts had thatched straw roofs, while others consisted of brush, canvas, or clapboards.

On February 16, 1778, from Valley Forge, Washington reached out to George Clinton, then governor of the Province of New York, for support, writing, "for some days past, there has been little less, than a famine in camp. A part of the army has been a week, without any kind of flesh, and the rest for three or four days. Naked and starving as they are, we cannot enough admire the incomparable patience and fidelity of the soldiery, that they have not been ere this excited by their sufferings, to a general mutiny or dispersion. Strong symptoms, however, discontent have appeared in particular instances; and nothing but the most active efforts every where can long avert so shocking a catastrophe."

In a letter to his wife Adrienne, Lafayette described the huts as "small barracks, which are scarcely more cheerful than dungeons."

=== Supply challenges ===
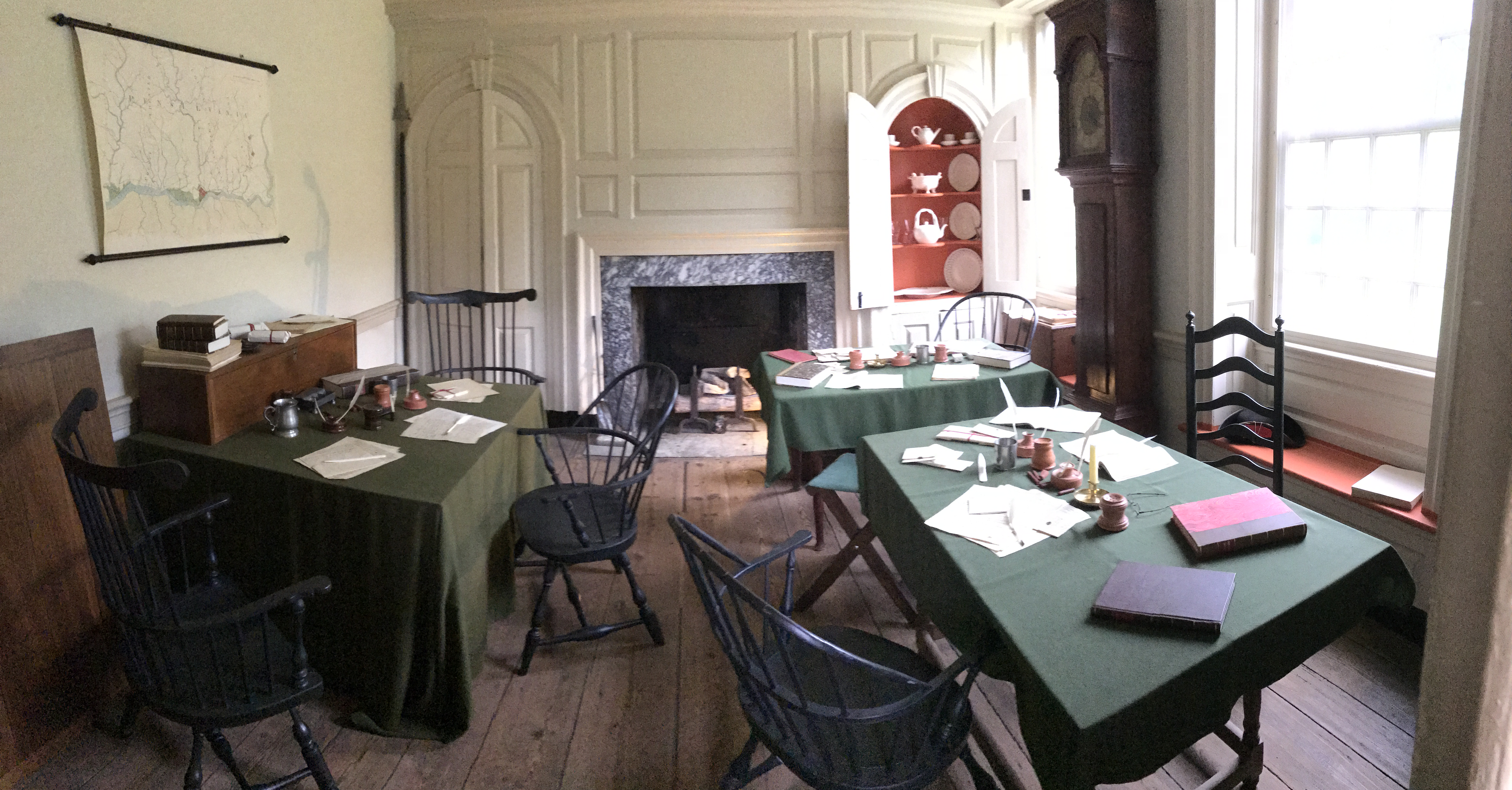
The interior of Washington's headquarters at Valley Forge

The Continental Army that marched into Valley Forge consisted of about 12,000 people, including soldiers, artificers, women, and children. Throughout the winter, patriot commanders and legislators faced the challenge of supplying a population the size of a large colonial city. In May and June 1777, the Continental Congress authorized the reorganization of the supply department. Implementation of those changes never fully took effect because of the fighting surrounding Philadelphia. Consequently, the supply chain had broken down even before the Continental Army arrived at Valley Forge. In large part, supplies dried up due to neglect by Congress so that by the end of December 1777 Washington had no way to feed or to adequately clothe the soldiers. Washington chose the Valley Forge area partly for its strategic benefits, but wintertime road conditions impeded supply wagons en route to the encampment.

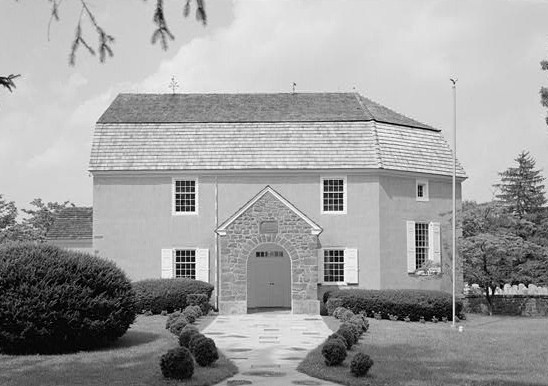
Pennsylvania German congregants at the Augustus Lutheran Church in Trappe, Pennsylvania (pictured) helped provide some provisions to Washington's troops at Valley Forge.

That winter, starvation and disease killed nearly 2,000 soldiers and perhaps as many as 1,500 horses. The men suffered from continual, gnawing hunger and cold. Washington ordered that soldiers' rations include either one to one and a half pounds of flour or bread, one pound of salted beef or fish, or three-quarters pound of salted pork, or one and a half pounds of flour or bread, a half pound of bacon or salted pork, a half pint of peas or beans, and one gill of whiskey or spirits. In practice, however, the army could not reliably supply the full ration. Perishable foods began to rot before reaching the troops because of poor storage, transportation problems, or confusion regarding the supplies' whereabouts. Other rations became lost or captured by the enemy. Traveling to market proved dangerous for some vendors. When combined with the Continental Army's lack of hard currency, prices for perishable goods inflated. Therefore, during the first few days of constructing their huts, the Continentals primarily ate firecakes, a tasteless mixture of flour and water cooked upon heated rocks. In his memoir, Joseph Plumb Martin wrote that "to go into the wild woods and build us habitations to stay (not to live) in, in such a weak, starved and naked condition, was appalling in the highest degree." Resentment swelled within the ranks towards those deemed responsible for their hardship.

On December 23, Washington wrote Henry Laurens, the President of the Continental Congress. Washington related how his commanders had just exerted themselves with some difficulty to quell a "dangerous mutiny", because of the lack of provision. Washington continued with a dire warning to Congress: "unless some great and capital change suddenly takes place in that line, this Army must inevitably be reduced to one or other of these three things, Starve, dissolve, or disperse, in order to obtain subsistence in the best manner they can."

That winter was not particularly harsh at Valley Forge; rather than bitter cold and snow, the weather fluctuated often between rain and snow. Many soldiers remained unfit for duty, owing to disease and to lack of proper clothing and uniforms ("naked" referred to a ragged or improperly attired individual). Years later, Lafayette recalled that "the unfortunate soldiers were in want of everything; they had neither coats, hats, shirts, nor shoes; their feet and legs froze till they had become almost black, and it was often necessary to amputate them."

On January 7, Christopher Marshall related how "ten teams of oxen, fit for slaughtering, came into camp, driven by loyal Philadelphia women. They also brought 2,000 shirts, smuggled from the city, sewn under the eyes of the enemy." While these women provided crucial assistance, most people remained relatively unaware of the Continental Army's plight—"an unavoidable result of a general policy" to prevent such intelligence from reaching the British.

The outlook for the army's situation improved when a five-man congressional delegation arrived on January 24. The delegates consisted of "Francis Dana of Massachusetts, Nathaniel Folsom of New Hampshire, John Harvie of Virginia, Gouverneur Morris of New York, and Joseph Reed of Pennsylvania." According to historian Wayne Bodle, they came to understand through their visit "how vulnerable the new army could be to logistical disruption, owing to its size, its organizational complexity, and its increasing mobility." Washington and his aides convinced them to implement recommended reforms to the supply department. In March 1778, Congress also appointed Nathanael Greene as Quartermaster General, who reluctantly accepted at Washington's behest. One of the Continental Army's most able generals, Greene did not want an administrative position. Yet he and his staff better supplied the troops at a time when the weather and road conditions began to improve. The Schuylkill River also thawed, allowing the Continental Army to more easily transport convoys from the main supply depot at Reading.

=== Environmental and disease conditions ===
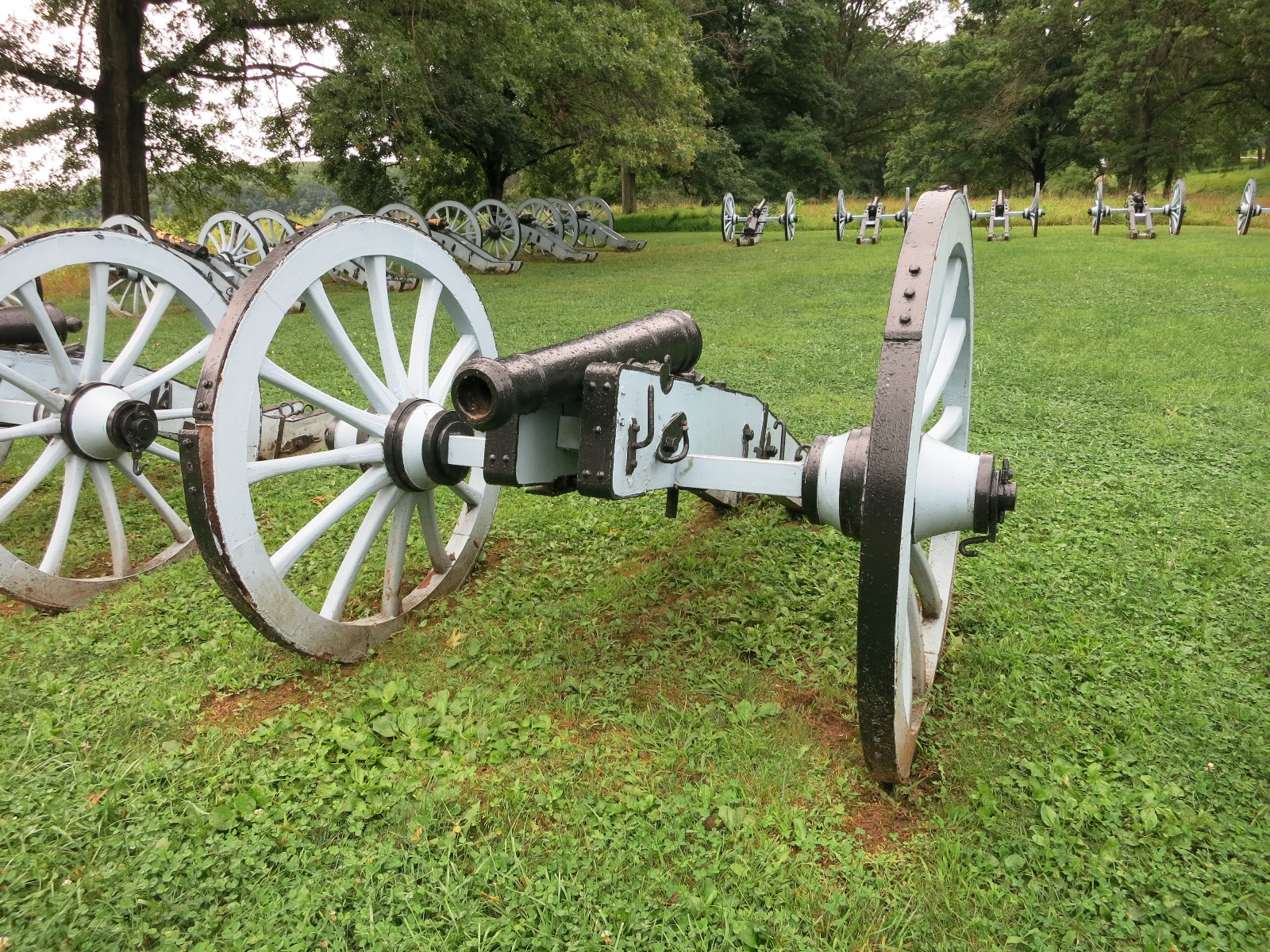
Cannons in Valley Forge's Artillery Park

Maintaining cleanliness was a challenge for the Continental Army. Scabies and other deadly ailments broke out because of the filthy conditions in the encampment. The Continental Army had a limited water supply for cooking, washing, and bathing. Dead horse remains often lay unburied, and Washington found the smell of some places intolerable. Neither plumbing nor a standardized system of trash collection existed. To combat the spread of contagion, Washington commanded soldiers to burn tar or "the Powder of a Musquet Cartridge" in the huts every day, to cleanse the air of putrefaction. On May 27, Washington had ordered his soldiers remove the mud-and-straw chinking from huts "to render them as airy as possible."

Outbreaks of typhoid and dysentery spread through contaminated food and water. Soldiers contracted influenza and pneumonia, while still others succumbed to typhus, caused by body lice. Although the inconsistent delivery of food rations did not cause starvation, it probably exacerbated the health of ailing soldiers. Some patients might have suffered from more than one ailment. In total, about 1,700–2,000 troops died during the Valley Forge encampment, mostly at general hospitals located outside the camp. Valley Forge had higher mortality than any other Continental Army encampment, and even any military engagement of the war.

Despite the mortality rate, Washington did curb the spread of smallpox, which had plagued the Continental Army since the American Revolution had begun in 1775. In January 1777, Washington had ordered mass inoculation of his troops, but a year later at Valley Forge, smallpox broke out again. An investigation uncovered that 3,000–4,000 troops had not received inoculations, despite having long-term enlistments. Washington ordered inoculations for any soldiers vulnerable to the disease.

A precursor to vaccination (introduced by Edward Jenner in 1798), inoculation gave the patient a milder form of smallpox with better recovery rates than if the patient had acquired the disease naturally. The procedure provided lifetime immunity from a disease with a roughly 15–33% mortality rate. In June 1778, when the Continental Army marched out of Valley Forge, they had completed "the first large-scale, state-sponsored immunization campaign in history." By continuing the inoculation program for new recruits, Washington better maintained military strength among the Continental Army troops throughout the remainder of the war.

== Encampment ==
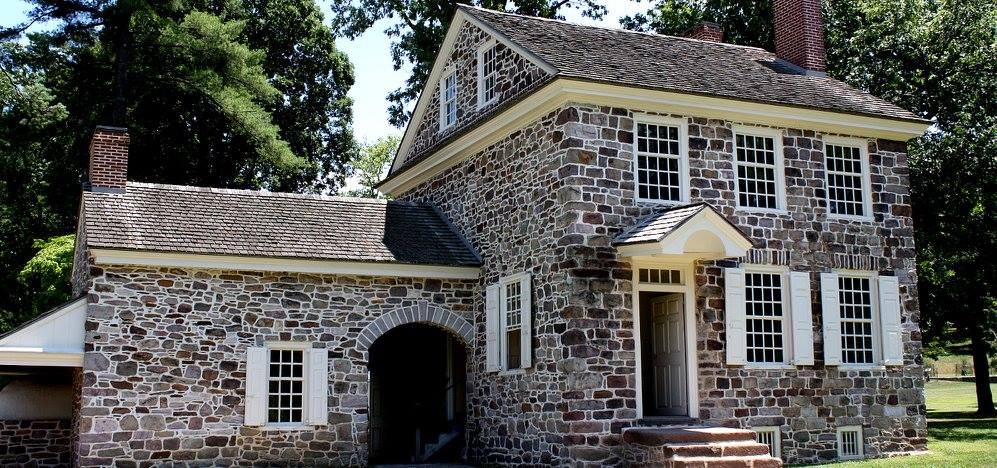
From December 1777 to June 1778, Washington made his headquarters in a business residence owned by Isaac Potts

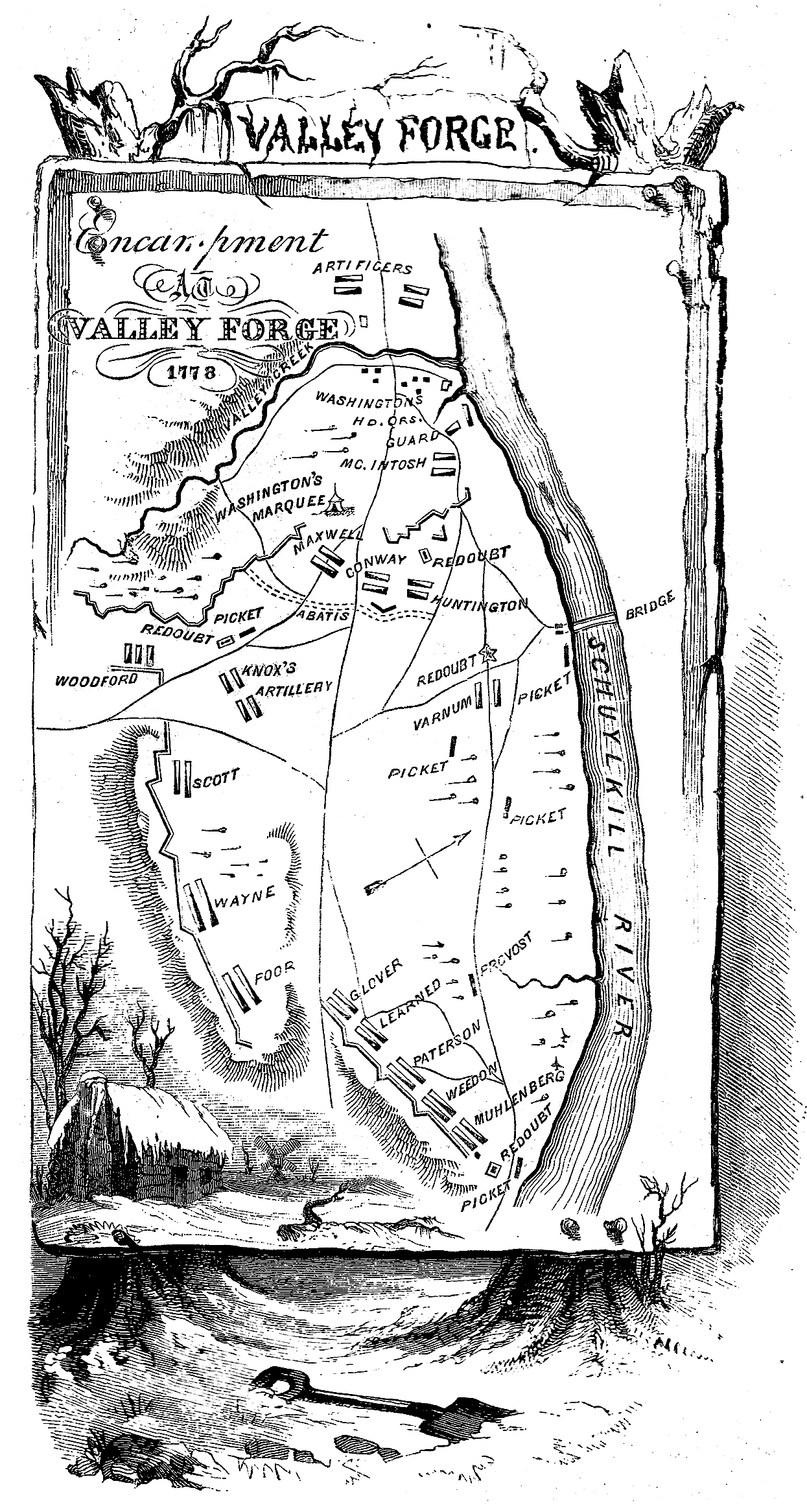
A map of the Valley Forge winter encampment in 1777, published in John Lossing Benson's 1860 book, The Pictorial Field-book of the Revolution

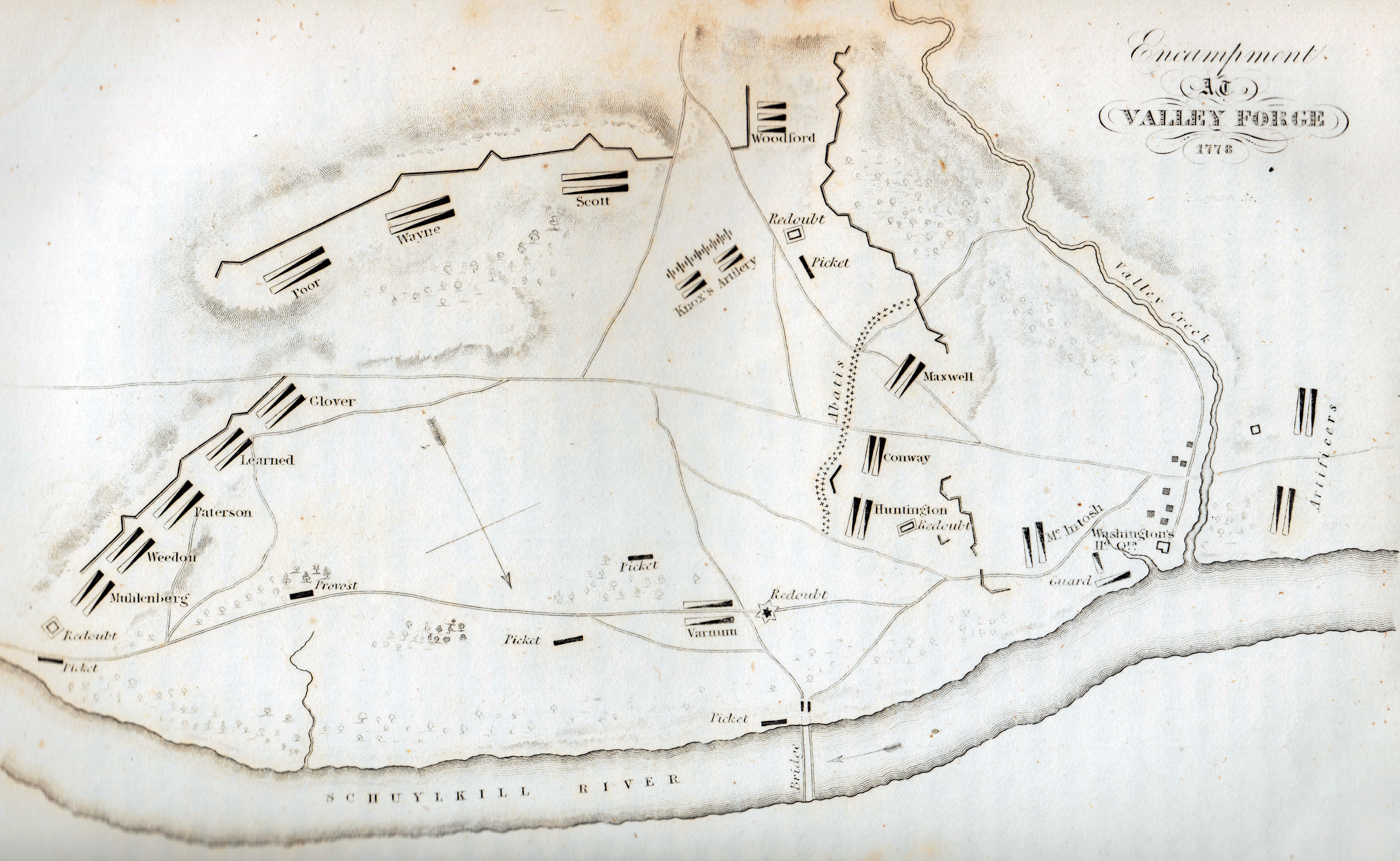
The encampment at Valley Forge in 1778 from an 1830 engraving by G. Boynton

While each hut housed a squad of twelve enlisted soldiers, sometimes soldiers' families joined them to share that space as well. Throughout the encampment period, Mary Ludwig Hays and approximately 250–400 other women had followed their soldier husbands or sweethearts to Valley Forge, sometimes with children in tow. Washington once wrote that "the multitude of women in particular, especially those who are pregnant, or have children, are a clog upon every movement." Yet women on the whole proved invaluable, whether on the march or at an encampment like Valley Forge. They often earned income either by laundering clothes or by nursing troops, which kept soldiers cleaner and healthier. In turn, this made the troops appear more professional and disciplined.

Lucy Flucker Knox, Catharine Littlefield "Caty" Greene, and other senior officers' wives journeyed to Valley Forge at the behest of their husbands. On December 22, Martha Washington predicted that her husband would send for her as soon as his army went into winter quarter, and that "if he does I must go." Indeed, she did, traveling in wartime with a group of slaves over poor roads, reaching her destination in early February. Washington's aide-de-camp Colonel Richard Kidder Meade met her at the Susquehanna ferry dock to escort her into the encampment. Over the next four months, Martha hosted political leaders and military officials, managing domestic staff within the confined space of Washington's Headquarters. She also organized meals and kept spirits high during the rough times at the encampment.

Valley Forge had a high percentage of racial and ethnic diversity, since Washington's army comprised individuals from each of the thirteen states. About 30% of Continental soldiers at Valley Forge did not speak English as their first language. Many soldiers and commanders hailed from German-speaking communities, as with Pennsylvania-born Brigadier General Peter Muhlenberg. Still others spoke Scottish- or Irish-Gaelic, and a few descended from French-speaking Huguenot and Dutch-speaking communities in New York. Local residents sometimes conversed in Welsh. Several senior officers in the Continental Army originally came from France, Prussia, Poland, Ireland, or Hungary.

Although Native American and African American men served the Continental Army as drovers, wagoners, and laborers, others fought as soldiers, particularly from Rhode Island and Massachusetts. The smallest of the states, Rhode Island had difficulty meeting recruitment quotas for white men, spurring Brigadier General James Mitchell Varnum to suggest the enlistment of slaves for his 1st Rhode Island Regiment.

Over a four-month period in 1778, the Rhode Island General Assembly allowed for their recruitment. In exchange for enlisting, soldiers of the 1st Rhode Island Regiment gained immediate emancipation, and their former owners received financial compensation equal to the slave's market value. They bought freedom for 117 enslaved recruits before the law allowing them to do so was repealed, but these free African American Soldiers continued to enlist in the military. By January 1778, nearly 10% of Washington's effective force consisted of African-American troops.

Commanders brought servants and enslaved people with them into the encampment, usually black people. Washington's enslaved domestic staff included his manservant William Lee, as well as cooks Hannah Till and her husband Isaac. William Lee had married Margaret Thomas, a free black woman who worked as a laundress at Washington's Headquarters. Hannah Till's legal owner Reverend John Mason lent her out to Washington, but Hannah secured an arrangement whereby she eventually bought her freedom.

By Spring 1778, Wappinger, Oneida and Tuscarora warriors who were on the side of the Patriots, with prominent Oneida leader Joseph Louis Cook of the St. Regis Mohawk among them, had joined the Americans at Valley Forge. Most served as scouts, keeping an eye out for British raiding parties in the area. In May 1778, they fought under Lafayette at Barren Hill. In the oral history of the Oneida people, a prominent Oneida woman named Polly Cooper brought "hundreds of bushels of white corn" to hungry troops, teaching them how to process it for safe consumption.

During the Revolutionary War, most Native American tribes sided with the British in order to protect their traditional homelands from the encroachment of American settlers. However, several tribes, including the Oneida, sided with the Patriots due in part to ties with American settlers, such as Presbyterian minister Samuel Kirkland. The Seven Nations of Canada and the Iroquois at what would be the Six Nations Reserve, who were mostly emigrants from New York, were brought to the brink of war by the Anglo-American conflict.

== Organizational challenges ==
Poor organization was a major challenge facing the Continental Army during the Valley Forge winter. Two years of war, shuffling leadership, and uneven recruitment resulted in irregular unit organization and strength. During the Valley Forge encampment, the army was reorganized into five divisions under Major Generals Charles Lee, Marquis de Lafayette, Johan de Kalb, and William Alexander "Lord Stirling", with Brigadier General Anthony Wayne serving in place of Mifflin. Unit strength and the terms of service became more standardized, improving the Continental Army's efficiency.

Washington enjoyed support among enlisted soldiers, but some commissioned officers and congressional officials were not as enthusiastic. During the winter encampment at Valley Forge, Washington's detractors attacked his leadership ability in both private correspondence and in public publications. One anonymous letter in January 1778 disparaged Washington: "The proper methods of attacking, beating, and conquering the Enemy has never as yet been adapted by the Commander in Chief."

The most organized threat to Washington's leadership was the so-called Conway Cabal. The cabal consisted of a handful of military officers and American politicians who attempted to replace Washington with Major General Horatio Gates as the head of the Continental army. The movement was nominally led by Thomas Conway, a foreign Continental army general and critic of Washington's leadership. A series of leaks and embarrassing exposures in the fall and winter of 1777 and 1778 dissolved the cabal, and Washington's reputation improved.

=== Training ===
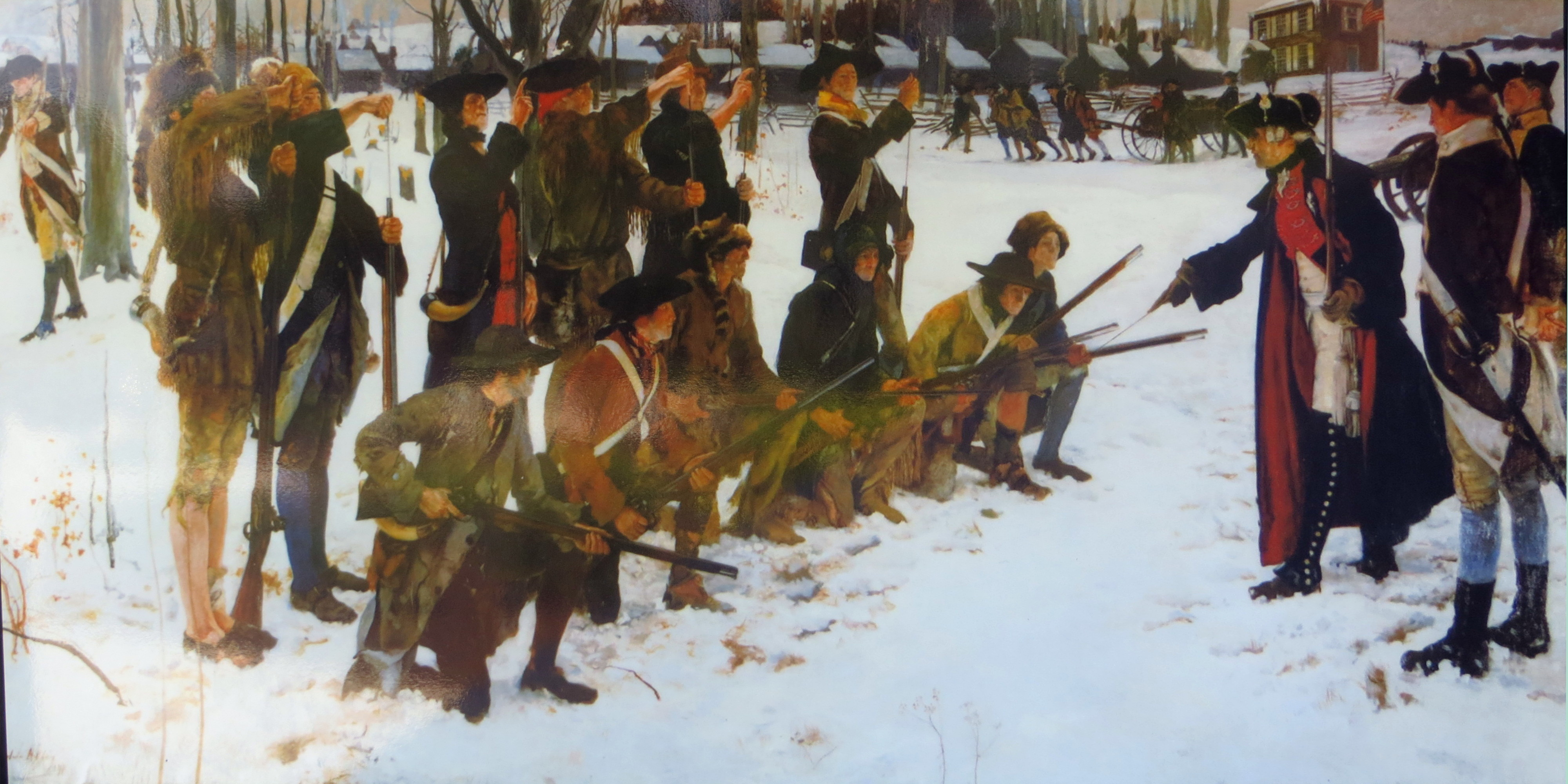
Prussian-born officer Baron von Steuben training Washington's Continental Army troops at Valley Forge in 1778, depicted in a portrait by Edwin Austin Abbey

Increasing military efficiency, morale, and discipline improved the army's well being, along with a better supply of food and arms. The Continental Army had been hindered in battle because units administered training from a variety of field manuals, making coordinated battle movements awkward and difficult. They struggled with basic formations and lacked uniformity, thanks to multiple drilling techniques taught in various ways by different officers. Baron Friedrich von Steuben, a Prussian drill master who had recently arrived from Europe, instituted a rigorous training program for the troops.

He drilled the soldiers, improving their battle and formation techniques. Under Steuben's leadership, the Continentals practiced volley fire, improved their maneuverability, standardized their march paces, exercised skirmishing operations, and drilled bayonet proficiency. These new efforts to train and discipline the army also improved morale among the soldiers.

== French Alliance ==
Initially, France was reluctant to directly involve itself in the war, despite a desire for revenge against Britain after France's defeat in the Seven Years' War. Frenchmen such as Beaumarchais and Lafayette signed on to the colonists' cause early on, providing private aid while the court waited to see how the war would go. In October 1777, the surrender of British General John Burgoyne's army at Saratoga led to the French government shifting in favor of supporting the Americans. France and the United States subsequently signed a treaty on February 6, 1778, the first recognition by a foreign power of the United Colonies, and a military alliance that allowed the French court to openly supply the Americans. In response, Britain declared war on France five weeks later on March 17. The new alliance eventually led Spain to declare war on Britain in 1778 as well.

On May 6, having already received word of the French alliance, Washington ordered the Continental Army to perform a Grand Review, which consisted of maneuvers by the army, cannon fire, and a Feu de Joie, a formal ceremony consisting of a rapid and sequential firing of guns down the ranks. Continental officer George Ewing wrote that "the troops then shouted, three cheers and 'Long live the King of France!' after this…three cheers and shout of 'God Save the friendly Powers of Europe!'…and cheers and a shout of 'God Save the American States!'" Each soldier received an extra gill of rum (about four ounces) to enjoy that day, and after the troops' dismissal, Washington and other officers drank many patriotic toasts and concluded the day "with harmless Mirth and jollity."

Both France and Great Britain had colonies around the world which required defending. General Sir Henry Clinton, who had replaced General Sir William Howe as the Commander-in-Chief, North America, diverted troops from Philadelphia to the British West Indies to protect them from French attacks. Clinton also feared that the French Navy would blockade Philadelphia, leading him to abandon it in favor of New York City, a Loyalist stronghold and Britain's headquarters in North America. On June 18, Washington and his troops marched after them, with the remainder vacating Valley Forge one day later, exactly six months after the Continental Army arrived in Valley Forge.

== Battle of Monmouth ==
On June 15, Clinton's army began withdrawing from Philadelphia, crossing the Delaware into New Jersey and consolidating around Haddonfield before marching to Allentown. American regulars and militia sniped at and skirmished with the British along with blocking roads, destroying bridges and spoiling wells, though this did not impede the progress of Clinton's troops. On June 24, the first British troops reached Allentown and Imlaystown. They continued to advance northwards and by June 26 Clinton had reached the Monmouth County Courthouse at modern-day Freehold Borough.

Washington, who had been informed of the British evacuation on June 17, chased Clinton's army, and both armies clashed on the morning of June 28, beginning the Battle of Monmouth, where Continental Army soldiers under the command of General Charles Lee engaged the British in approximately five hours of continuous fighting in a ferocious heat. The battle ended inconclusively, though both sides claimed victory. In the evening, Clinton's army quietly slipped away and resumed its march towards Sandy Hook, successfully completing the planned evacuation to New York. The Continental Army, bolstered by its training at Valley Forge, had performed significantly better than in previous battles, and the professional conduct of the American troops was widely noted by the British.

== Legacy ==
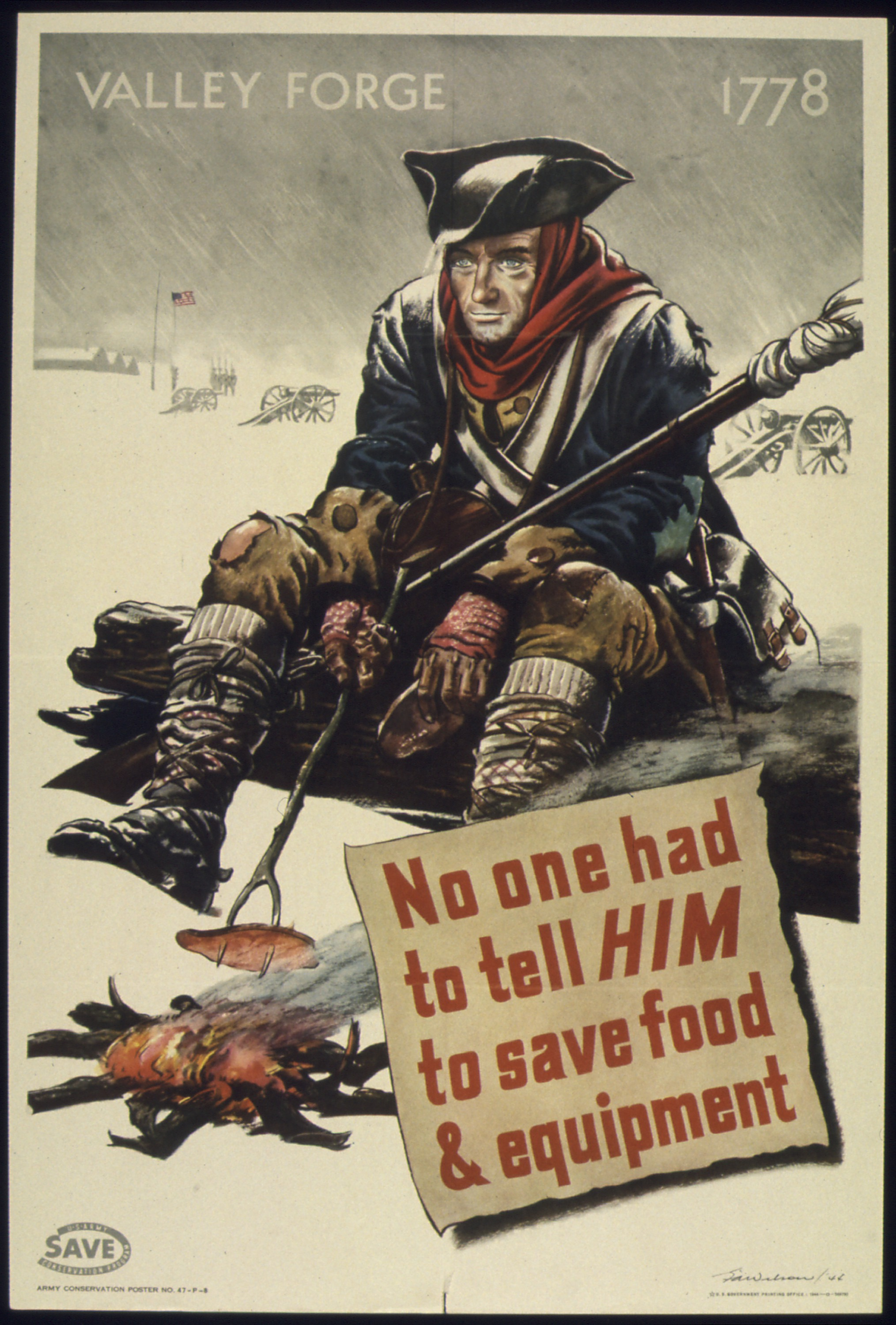
A World War II poster that references Valley Forge; "No one had to tell him to save food and equipment," it says.

Valley Forge long occupied a prominent place in U.S. storytelling and memory. The encampment in Pennsylvania later became a national historical site where many efforts were taken to preserve and capture the meaning and feelings many had behind the location’s historic significance and well-known stories; this perception regarding the historical context behind the site molded history’s patriotic view on Valley Forge. Many historians have supported and conveyed Valley Forge’s relevance in its allegorical context versus its historic understanding. The image of Valley Forge as a site of terrible suffering and unshakeable perseverance endured years after the encampment ended.

One of the most enduring stories about the Valley Forge encampment concerns the weather. Later depictions of Valley Forge described the encampment as blanketed in snow, with exposure and frostbite supposedly claiming the lives of many soldiers. Amputations occurred, but no corroborating sources state that death occurred from the freezing temperatures alone. Rather, snowfall occurred infrequently, above-freezing temperatures were regular, and ice was uncommon. Stories of harsh weather likely originated from the 1779–1780 winter encampment at Jockey Hollow, near Morristown, New Jersey, which had the coldest winter of the war. However, accounts of rain, sleet, snow, and frequent high winds, compounded by food shortages and inadequate clothing, exist in the correspondence and writings of General Washington and Surgeon General, Albigence Waldo, and others.

One of the most popular Valley Forge stories involves Washington kneeling in the snow praying for his army's salvation. The image was popularized in paintings, sculptures, and newspapers. Former U.S. President Ronald Reagan even repeated it. However, skeptics contend that there is no official documentation of this private affair extent suggesting such a prayer never occurred. The story first appeared in an 1804 article by Mason Locke Weems, an itinerant minister, popular folklorist, and Washington biographer. In Weems' story, a neutral Quaker named Isaac Potts discovered Washington at prayer and relayed the story to his wife and daughter, Ruth Ann. After his encounter, and moved by the sight of Washington at prayer, he declared his support for the U.S. cause.

According to the historian Edward Lengel, Potts did not live near Valley Forge during the encampment period and did not marry his wife until 1803. The historian Burk W. Herbert, however, maintains that at the age of 20 Isaac married Martha Bolton on December 6, 1770. The Washington at prayer account is taken from a paper in the handwriting of Ruth Anna, Isaac's daughter. Another account however, a Presbyterian minister named Nathaniel Randolph Snowden, has Isaac's father, John, who was instead the one witnessed Washington at prayer, an account in which Weems disagreed. Despite the discrepancy of names between father and son, the story has endured over the years. One of the ships in the 1972 film Silent Running is named after Valley Forge. Valley Forge is also the name of a succession of starships in the 1959 novel Starship Troopers.

== See also ==
- Bodo Otto, senior surgeon of the Continental Army
- Chester County, Pennsylvania
- Montgomery County, Pennsylvania
- Sesquicentennial issues of 1926–1932 (a series of 150th anniversary commemorative stamps for Valley Forge and battles of the American Revolution)
- Upper Merion Township, Montgomery County, Pennsylvania
- USS Valley Forge
- Valley Forge Military Academy and College
- Valley Forge Pilgrimage

== Bibliography ==
- Bobrick, Benson (1997). Angel in the Whirlwind. New York: Simon & Schuster. ISBN 9781451628555.
- Bodle, Wayne K. (2002). The Valley Forge Winter: Civilians and Soldiers in War. Pennsylvania State University Press. ISBN 9780271022307.
- Burk, William Herbert (1912). Historical and Topographical Guide to Valley Forge. John C. Winston Company.
- Cox, Caroline (2004). A Proper Sense of Honor: Service and Sacrifice in George Washington's Army. University of North Carolina Press. ISBN 9780807828847.
- Dorson, Richard (1953). America rebels : narratives of the patriots. New York, Pantheon.
- Ellis, Joseph J. (2007). American Creation: Triumphs and Tragedies at the Founding of the Republic. Alfred A. Knopf, New York. ISBN 9780307276452.
- Fitzpatrick, John C., ed. (1933). The Writings of George Washington. Vol. 10. U.S. Government Printing Office.
- Loane, Nancy K. (2009). Following the Drum: Women at the Valley Forge Encampment. Potomac Books. ISBN 9781597973854.
- Jackson, John W. (1992). Valley Forge: Pinnacle of Courage. Thomas Publications.
- Lengel, Edward G. (2005). General George Washington: A Military Life. Random House Publishing Group. ISBN 9781588364807.
- John C. Fitzpatrick, ed. (1933). The Writings of George Washington. Vol. 10. U.S. Government Printing Office.
