= Emma Camp Mead =

Oneida businesswoman

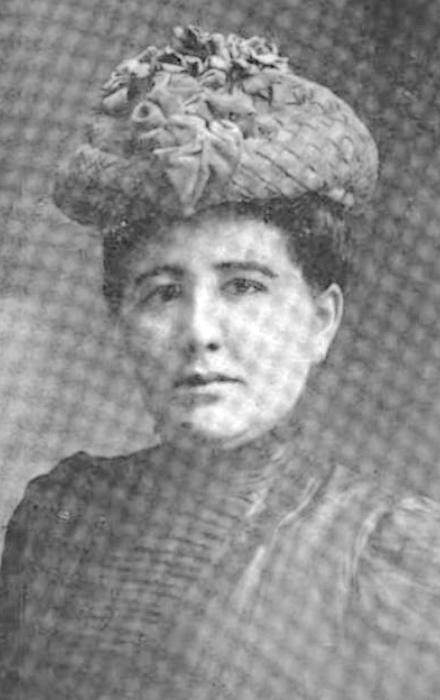
- Emma Camp Mead, from a 1916 publication
- Born: Emma Jane Camp; 1866; Indian Lake, New York
- Died: December 4, 1934 (aged 67–68); Indian Lake, New York
- Occupations: Hotelkeeper, herbalist
- Relatives: Polly Cooper (great-grandmother); Beulah Dark Cloud (cousin)

Emma Jane Camp Mead (1866 – December 4, 1934) was a hotelkeeper and herbalist in the Adirondacks; she was a member of the Oneida people, like her mother; her father's family was Abenaki.

== Early life and education ==
Emma Camp was born near Indian Lake, New York, the daughter of Elijah Camp and Elizabeth Kennedy Camp. Her father was Abenaki and her mother was Oneida. Her parents ran a hunting lodge, and her father worked as a wilderness guide. She was a great-granddaughter of Polly Cooper. Actress Beulah Dark Cloud was her cousin.

== Career ==
With a large settlement from her former husband's family, Mead opened a dry goods store in Indian Lake, and later opened Adirondack House near Indian Lake, renting rooms and cabins to hunting and fishing vacationers in the area. She also maintained a farm, and sold her own herbal remedies. She also interpreted news reports for locals who were not literate in English, especially in the events leading up to the Indian Citizenship Law of 1924.

== Personal life ==
In 1882, Camp married Gabriel Mead, a white man. His family, opposing the marriage, paid her ten thousand dollars to agree to an annulment of the marriage. This arrangement was reported in newspapers across the United States in August 1883. The couple remarried in 1885, and had a daughter, Bessie, born in 1886. Gabriel soon left the marriage again, and Bessie died in a fall when she was three years old. Emma Mead died in 1934, at the age of 68. There is a collection of her papers held by the Indian Lake Historical Society.
