= 2001–02 Brighton & Hove Albion W.F.C. season =

Brighton & Hove Albion
2001-02 season
- Chairman: Dick Knight
- FA Women's Premier League: 7th
- FA Cup: Fourth round

The 2001-02 Brighton & Hove Albion W.F.C season was the club's first appearance in the top flight in the FA Women's Premier League, the highest level of the football pyramid. Along with competing in the Women's Premier League, the club also contested the FA Women's FA Cup and League Cup.

== FA Women's Premier League ==
The club finished seventh in the 2001–02 season.

=== Results ===
3 March 2002 1	Brighton & Hove Albion	3-0	Sputhampton Saints	Bognor Regis
	Mead Roberts-Moore	Report
