= The Splendid Road =

1925 film by Frank Lloyd

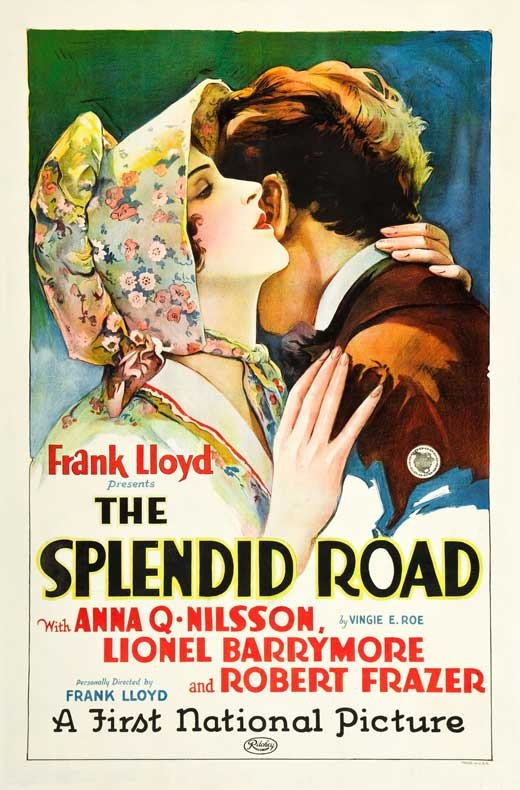
- Theatrical release poster
- Directed by: Frank Lloyd
- Written by: J.G. Hawks
- Based on: The Splendid Road by Vingie E. Roe
- Produced by: Frank Lloyd
- Starring: Anna Q. Nilsson; Robert Frazer; Lionel Barrymore
- Cinematography: Norbert Brodine
- Production company: Frank Lloyd Productions
- Distributed by: First National Pictures
- Release date: December 6, 1925
- Running time: 80 minutes
- Country: United States
- Language: Silent (English intertitles)

The Splendid Road is a 1925 American historical drama film directed by Frank Lloyd and starring Anna Q. Nilsson, Robert Frazer, and Lionel Barrymore. Based upon the novel of the same name by Vingie E. Roe, the film is set during the 1849 California Gold Rush.

== Plot ==
As described in a review in a film magazine, one of the passengers on a ship sailing from Boston around Cape Horn to California is an adventurous young woman, Sandra (Nilsson). A widow dies, and her little girl appeals to Sandra. Rather than split the little family, Sandra adopts all three children, and decides to remain in Sacramento and make a home for them. Chance brings Stanton Halliday (Frazer), an agent for John Grey (Davis), a capitalist, to her rescue and they become attracted to each other. Doctor Bidwell (Earle) loves the capitalist's daughter Lillian (Day) but, believing she loves Halliday, he persuades Sandra that she must give him up or ruin his career. Halliday is ordered to evict Sandra who is a squatter, but he refuses and goes to her rescue. Halliday is shot by Dan Chehollis (Barrymore), a gambler who seeks to force his attentions on Sandra. While convalescing, he learns of Bidwell's action and goes back to Sandra, arriving in time to take her and her family away to safety after a wild wagon ride, as floods have caused the levee to burst and the town is flooded.

== Cast ==
- Anna Q. Nilsson as Sandra De Hault
- Robert Frazer as Stanton Halliday
- Lionel Barrymore as Dan Clehollis
- Edwards Davis as John Grey - Banker
- Roy Laidlaw as Capt. Sutter
- DeWitt Jennings as Capt. Bashford
- Russell Simpson as Capt. Lightfoot
- George Bancroft as Buck Lockwell
- Gladys Brockwell as Satan's Sister
- Pauline Garon as Angel Allie
- Marceline Day as Lilian Grey
- Mary Jane Irving as Hester Gephart
- Mickey McBan as Billy Gephart
- Edward Earle as Dr. Bidwell

== Preservation ==
With no copies of The Splendid Road located in any film archives, it is a lost film.

== See also ==
- Lionel Barrymore filmography
- List of early color feature films

== Bibliography ==
- Goble, Alan (1999). The Complete Index to Literary Sources in Film. Walter de Gruyter. ISBN 978-3-11-095194-3
