= Mary Jane Irving =

American actor

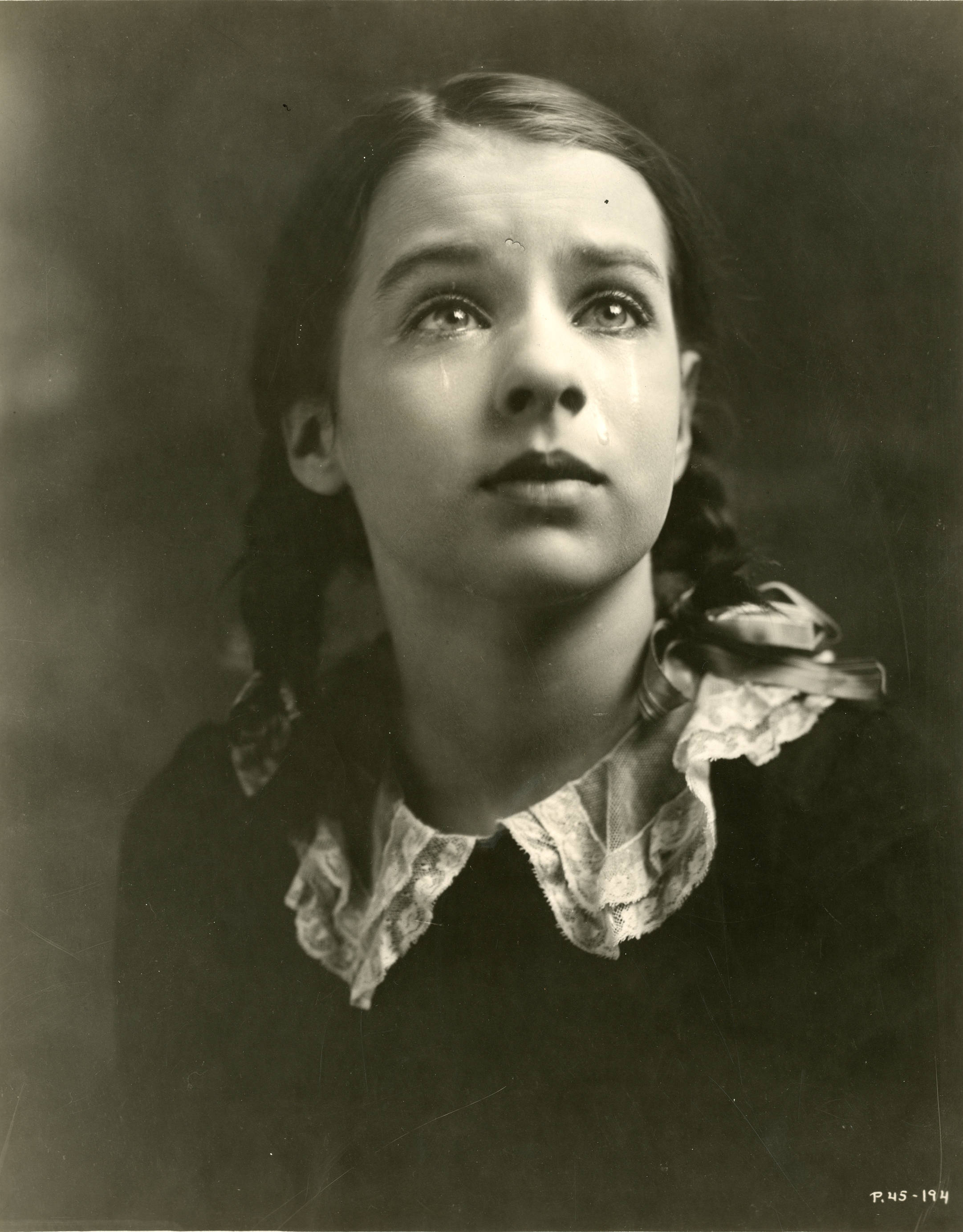
- Jane Irving in 1925
- Born: October 20, 1913; United States
- Died: July 17, 1983 (aged 69); Los Angeles, California, U.S.
- Other name: Jane Irving
- Occupation: Actress
- Years active: 1917–1938
- Spouse: Robert Carson (m. 1938; died 1983)

Mary Jane Irving (October 20, 1913 – July 17, 1983) was an American actress. She appeared in 58 films between 1917 and 1938.

== Biography ==
Irving debuted in films when she was 2 years old. She "played a lot of baby roles, then disappeared from the picture." She returned to film in The Godless Girl (1928). Irving portrayed Mary in the film Tom Sawyer (1930). Her "first grown-up characterization" came in Arsène Lupin (1932).

Irving's off-screen work as an adult included being the stand-in for Janet Gaynor. The two looked enough alike that Irving was sometimes mistaken for Gaynor.

Irving attended Hollywood High School.

Irving was married to screenwriter Robert Carson until his death in 1983. Seven months after her husband's death, Irving died in Los Angeles, California.

== Filmography ==
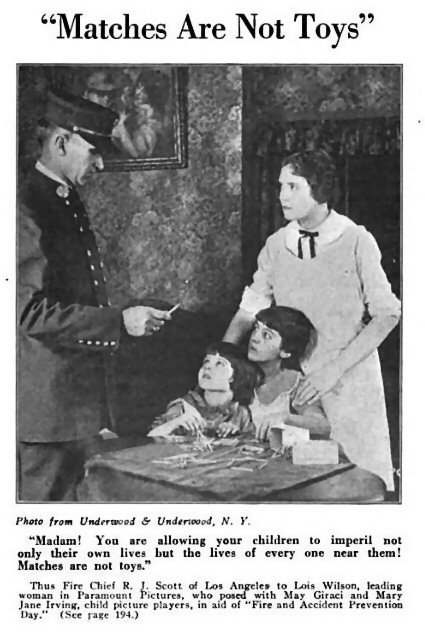
Los Angeles Fire Chief R. J. Scott with actress Lois Wilson and child actresses Mae Giraci and Mary Jane Irving (right) in Safety Engineering (January 1921).

Year	Film	Role	Notes
1917	The Square Deal Man	Blossom - the child	
1918	The One Woman	Girl	
1918	An Alien Enemy	Fräulein Bertha Meyer	
1918	Patriotism	Mimi	
1918	The White Lie	Mary Jane	
1918	The Heart of Rachael	Rachael's daughter	
1918	The Temple of Dusk	Blossom	
1919	Will You Be Staying for Supper?		
1919	The Brand	The Child	
1919	Tangled Threads	Little Barbara	
1919	The Woman Michael Married	Girl	
1919	The Westerners	Little Molly Welch	
1919	The Gray Horizon	Kenneth Furthman	
1919	Desert Gold	The Child	
1919	Almost a Husband	Little Girl	Uncredited
1920	Live Sparks	Undetermined Role	
1920	The Luck of Geraldine Laird	Child	
1920	A Woman Who Understood	Peggy Knight	
1921	The Home Stretch	Gwen Duffy	
1921	A Certain Rich Man	Young Janet Barclay	
1921	A Broken Doll	Rosemary	
1922	The Cradle	Doris Harvey	
1922	Travelin' On	Mary Jane Morton	
1922	When Romance Rides	Bostie Bostil	
1922	Golden Dreams	Child Clown	Credited as Jane Irving
1922	The Top of New York	Susan Gray	
1922	Borderland	Totty	
1922	Heart's Haven	Ella Laird	
1923	Lost and Found on a South Sea Island	Baby Madge	Alternative titles: Captain Blackbird; Lost and Found; Passion of the Sea
1923	Little Church Around the Corner	Little Hetty (As a child)	
1923	An Old Sweetheart of Mine	Mary Ellen Anderson (As a girl)	
1923	Cordelia the Magnificent	François	
1923	The Age of Desire	Margy (age 10)	
1923	The Light That Failed	Young Maisie	
1924	The Stranger	Maizie Darrant	
1924	Fair Week	Tinkle	
1924	Good Bad Boy	Judge Fawcett's daughter	
1925	The Golden Bed	Margaret (As a child)	Uncredited
1925	The Shining Adventure	Lamey	
1925	Sky's the Limit	Richard Hamilton's daughter	
1925	The Tower of Lies	Little girl	
1925	The Splendid Road	Hester Gephart	
1926	Lovey Mary	Asia	Alternative title: Mrs. Wiggs of the Cabbage Patch
1926	Scotty of the Scouts	Mary Andrews	
1926	The Flaming Forest	Ruth McTavish	
1927	Night Life	Daughter of War Profiteer	
1929	The Godless Girl	The Victim	
1930	The Florodora Girl	Vibart Child	Alternative title: The Gay Nineties
1930	Tom Sawyer	Mary	
1932	Without Honor	Bernice Donovan	Alternative title: Without Honors
1932	Arsène Lupin	Marie	
1932	Probation	Gwen	Alternative title: Second Chances
1932	Mother's Holiday	The Daughter	
1933	Malay Nights	Salvation Lass	Alternative title: Shadows of Singapore
1934	Student Tour	Student	Uncredited
1934	Gunfire	Sally Moore	
1936	Follow the Fleet		Uncredited
1937	A Star Is Born		Uncredited
1938	Having Wonderful Time	Camp Guest	Uncredited
