= Desert Gold (1919 American film) =

1919 film

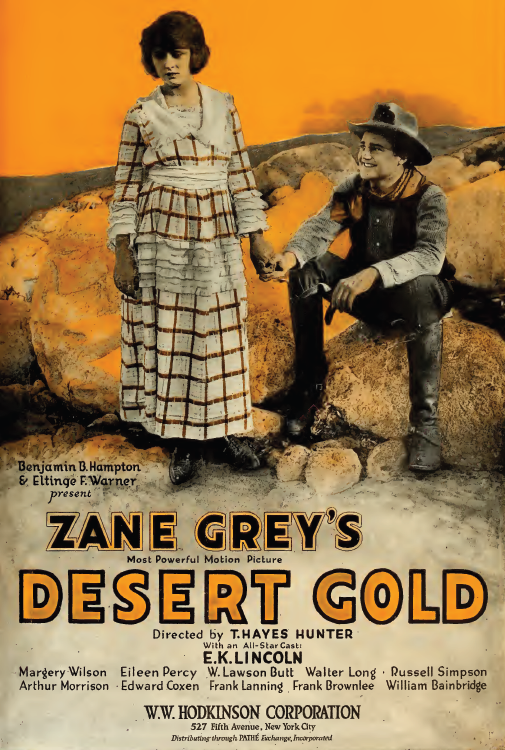
- Directed by: T. Hayes Hunter
- Written by: Fred Myton
- Based on: Desert Gold by Zane Grey
- Produced by: Benjamin B. Hampton
- Starring: E.K. Lincoln; Margery Wilson; Eileen Percy
- Cinematography: Abe Scholtz; Arthur L. Todd
- Production company: Zane Grey Pictures
- Distributed by: Hodkinson Pictures; Pathe Exchange
- Release date: November 22, 1919
- Running time: 70 minutes
- Country: United States
- Languages: Silent; English intertitles

Desert Gold is a 1919 American silent Western film directed by T. Hayes Hunter and starring E.K. Lincoln, Margery Wilson and Eileen Percy. It is based on the 1913 novel of the same title by Zane Grey.

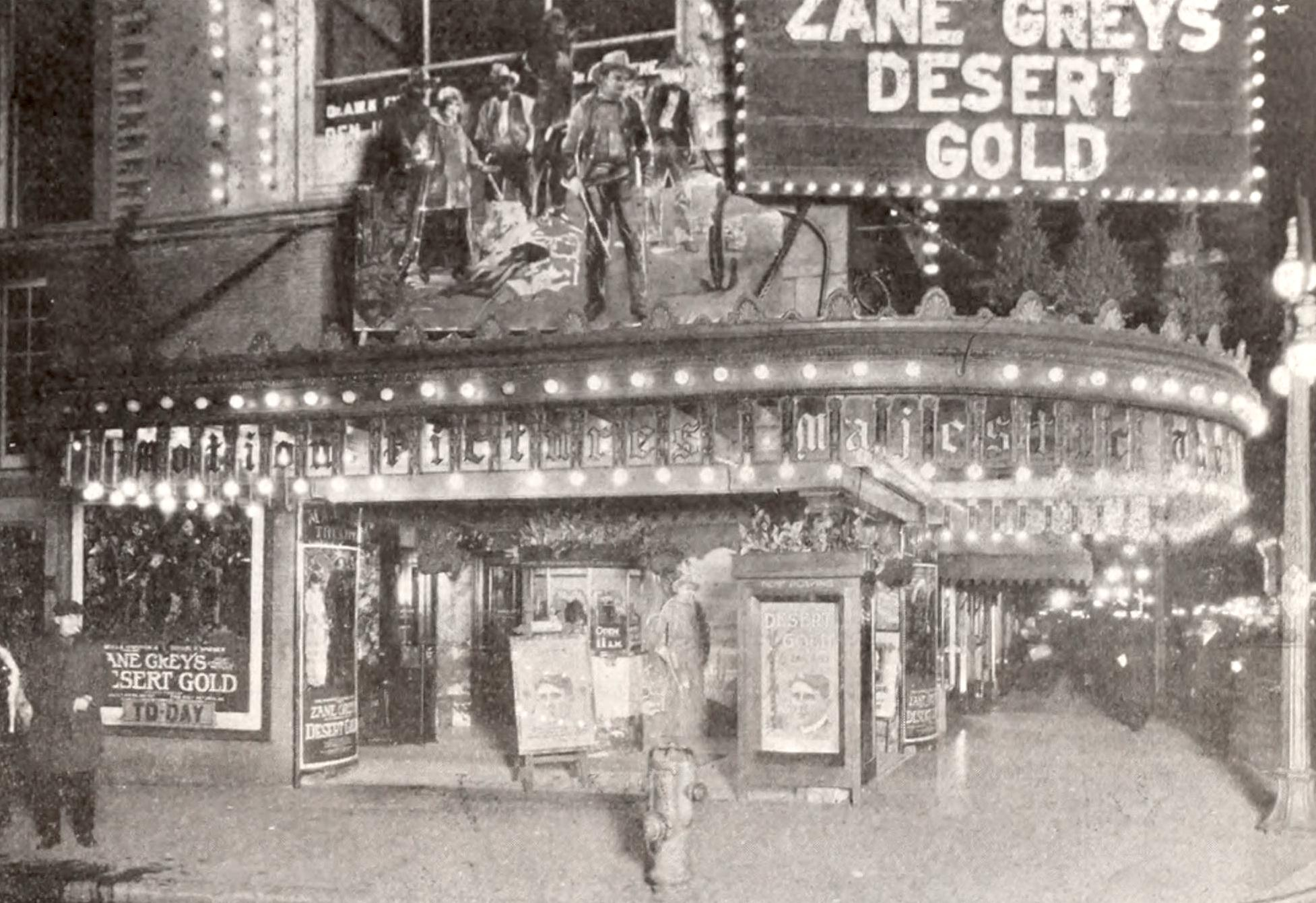
Desert Gold while in cinemas in 1920 at the Majestic Theatre.

== Cast ==
- E.K. Lincoln as Dick Gale
- Margery Wilson as Mercedes Castenada
- Eileen Percy as Nell
- Lawson Butt as The Yaqui
- Russell Simpson as Ladd
- Walter Long as Rojas
- Edward Coxen as Captain George Thorne
- Frank Brownlee as Jonas Warren
- Arthur Morrison as Lash
- Jeanne Carpenter as Jeanne Carpenter
- Beulah Dark Cloud as Papago Indian Mother
- Mary Jane Irving as The Child
- Frank Lanning as Papago Indian Son
- Laura Winston as Mrs. Belding
- W.H. Bainbridge as Jim Belding

== Production ==
Desert Gold was partially shot on location in the Colorado Desert, California, with the film crew's headquarters at Palm Springs, California.

== Preservation ==
With no holdings located in archives, Desert Gold is considered a lost film.

== Bibliography ==
- Goble, Alan. The Complete Index to Literary Sources in Film. Walter de Gruyter, 1999.
