= A Broken Doll =

1921 film by Allan Dwan

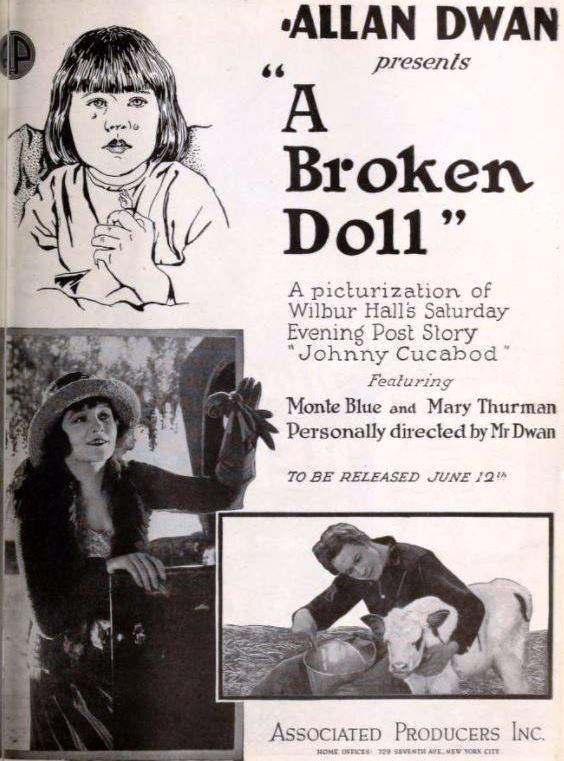
- Directed by: Allan Dwan
- Written by: Allan Dwan; Wilbur Hall (story); Lillian Ducey
- Produced by: Allan Dwan
- Starring: Monte Blue; Mary Thurman; Mary Jane Irving
- Cinematography: H. Lyman Broening; L. William O'Connell
- Production company: Allan Dwan Productions
- Distributed by: Associated Producers
- Release date: June 12, 1921
- Running time: 50 minutes
- Country: United States
- Languages: Silent; English intertitles

A Broken Doll is a 1921 American silent drama film directed by Allan Dwan and starring Monte Blue, Mary Thurman and Mary Jane Irving.

== Plot ==
The film centers on a ranch hand named Tommy Dawes and a young girl called Rosemary, who is disabled and the daughter of his boss, Bill Nyall. One day, Tommy accidentally breaks Rosemary’s favorite doll. He borrows a $20 gold coin to replace it, but on his way into town, he’s attacked and robbed by an escaped prisoner, named Knapp Wyant. The police erroneously identify Tommy as the perpetrator, leading to his arrest.

== Cast ==
- Monte Blue as Tommy Dawes
- Mary Thurman as Harriet Bundy
- Mary Jane Irving as Rosemary
- Les Bates as Bill Nyall
- Lizette Thorne as Mrs. Nyell
- Arthur Millett as Sheriff Hugh Bundy
- Jack Riley as Knapp Wyant

== Bibliography ==
- Frederic Lombardi. Allan Dwan and the Rise and Decline of the Hollywood Studios. McFarland, 2013.
