= Travelin' On (film) =

1922 film

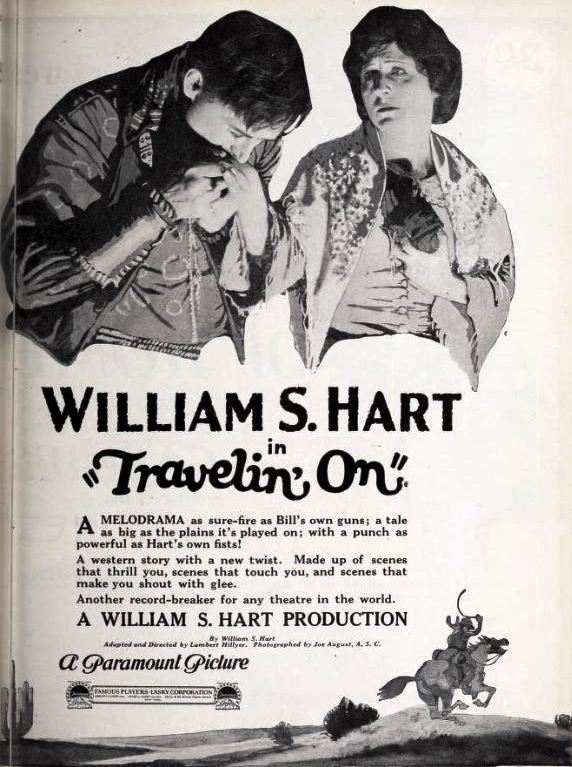
- Advertisement
- Directed by: Lambert Hillyer
- Screenplay by: William S. Hart; Lambert Hillyer
- Produced by: William S. Hart
- Starring: William S. Hart; James Farley; Ethel Grey Terry; Brinsley Shaw; Mary Jane Irving; Bob Kortman; Willis Marks
- Cinematography: Joseph H. August
- Production company: William S. Hart Productions
- Distributed by: Paramount Pictures
- Release date: March 5, 1922
- Running time: 70 minutes
- Country: United States
- Languages: Silent; English intertitles

Travelin' On is a 1922 American silent Western film directed by Lambert Hillyer, written by William S. Hart and Lambert Hillyer, and starring William S. Hart, James Farley, Ethel Grey Terry, Brinsley Shaw, Mary Jane Irving, Bob Kortman, and Willis Marks. It was released on March 5, 1922, by Paramount Pictures. A copy of the film is in the Library of Congress.

== Plot ==
As described in a film magazine, J.B. rides into Tumble Bluff and at once gets into an altercation with Dandy Dan McGee, the proprietor of the Palace dance hall and saloon. McGee is determined to drive the new minister, who is erecting a church, out of town, and attempts to force his attentions on the minister's wife Susan. She is saved by J.B., but not for social reasons alone but because he wants her for himself. J.B. becomes friendly with the minister's child Mary Jane, and learns to spell from her primer. Susan sells him a Bible and asks him to read it. The stage coach is robbed and the criminal escapes on a "painted" pony belonging to J.B. The minister is accused of the crime by McGee and is about to be hung when J.B. rides in and cuts the minister down. J.B. "confesses" that he held up the stage and rides off into the desert while reading his Bible. Previously he had planned to abduct the ministers wife, but became conscious struck when he discovered McGee in her house on the same errand.

== Cast ==
- William S. Hart as J.B., The Stranger
- James Farley as Dandy Dan McGee
- Ethel Grey Terry as Susan Morton
- Brinsley Shaw as Hi Morton
- Mary Jane Irving as Mary Jane Morton
- Bob Kortman as Gila
- Willis Marks as 'Know-It-All' Haskins
- Jocko the Monkey as Jocko
