= Vingie E. Roe =

American novelist

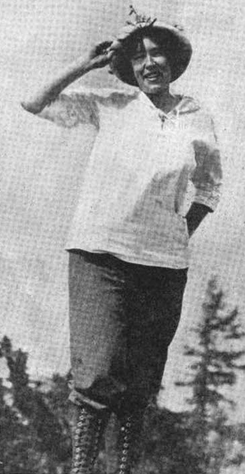
Vingie E. Roe in a 1918 publication

Vingie E. Lawton Roe (December 7, 1879 — August 13, 1958) was an American novelist and screenwriter.

== Early life ==
Vingetta Elizabeth Roe (some sources give her middle name as "Eve") was born in Oxford, Kansas and raised in Oklahoma Territory, the daughter of Maurice Pool Roe, a physician, and Clara Castanien Roe. As a child she was kept from school to preserve her weak eyesight. She briefly attended Oklahoma Agricultural and Mechanical College in 1902.

== Career ==
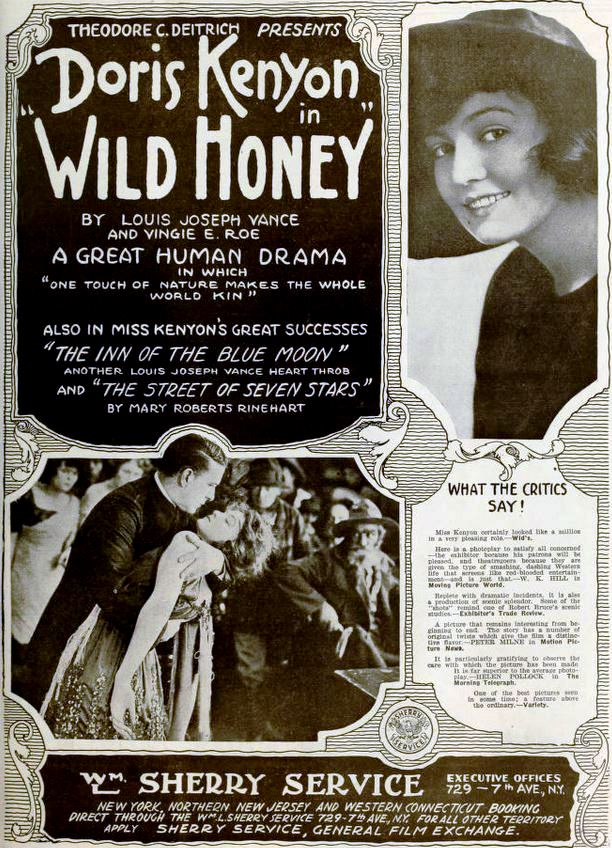
Advertisement for Wild Honey (1918), crediting Vingie E. Roe as co-writer

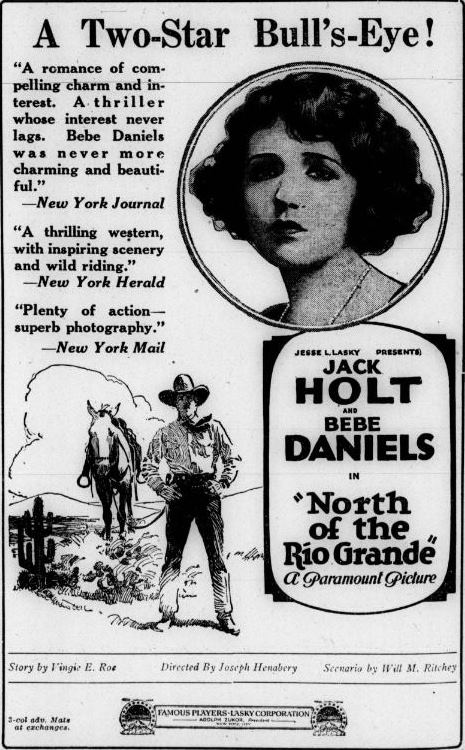
An advertisement for North of the Rio Grande (1922), crediting Vingie E. Roe for the story

Roe wrote more than thirty novels, mostly Westerns "with a feminist twist", and dozens of stories published between 1906 and 1930 in publications including Sunset, Munsey's, McCall's and Collier's. Her stories were also serialized in newspapers. Her first novel was The Maid of the Whispering Hills (1912), which was praised as "a big novel by an author of great promise" in a San Francisco Call review. "I stand for clean literature", she told an audience of writers in 1929. "I have never written a dirty sex story and I never will."

Her stories were adapted into eight silent films and one sound picture.

== Affiliations ==
She was a member of the Berkeley Branch of the California Writers Club, the Sacramento Branch of the League of American Penwomen, and the Author's League of America.

== Personal life ==
Vingie E. Roe married Raymond C. Lawton, an electrical engineer, in 1907. They lived in Oregon and owned an orchard. After they divorced, Vingie Roe lived with her mother at Lost Valley Ranch in Napa County, California. She had many farm animals on the ranch and employed John and William Haak as care takers. She hosted annual gatherings of women writers on her ranch. She died in 1958 from heart problems at 78 years of age. Her papers are archived at Oklahoma State University.

== Filmography ==
- The Heart of the Night Wind (1914)
- Her Idol (1915)
- The Primal Lure (1916)
- Wild Honey (1918)
- Twilight (1919), based on her story The Alchemy of Love
- The Crimson Challenge (1922, now lost), based on her novel Tharon of Lost Valley; one critic called this "the most impressive western film of 1922", and said it "may have been the first film centered on a female gunfighter".
- North of the Rio Grande (1922, now lost), based on her novel Val of Paradise
- The Splendid Road (1925, now lost)
- A Perilous Journey (1953), based on her novel The Golden Tide
