= Arsène Lupin (1932 film) =

1932 film by Jack Conway

- French theatrical poster
- Directed by: Jack Conway
- Screenplay by: Carey Wilson
- Dialogue by: Bayard Veiller Lenore Coffee
- Based on: Arsène Lupin; 1908 play by Maurice Leblanc; Francis de Croisset
- Produced by: Louis B. Mayer; Irving Thalberg; Samuel Goldwyn (uncredited)
- Starring: John Barrymore; Lionel Barrymore
- Cinematography: Oliver T. Marsh
- Edited by: Hugh Wynn
- Music by: Alfred Newman
- Production company: Metro-Goldwyn-Mayer
- Distributed by: Loew's Inc.
- Release date: March 5, 1932
- Running time: 84 minutes
- Country: United States
- Language: English
- Budget: $433,000
- Box office: $1,110,000

Arsène Lupin is a 1932 American pre-Code mystery film directed by Jack Conway and starring John Barrymore and Lionel Barrymore. It was produced and distributed by Metro-Goldwyn-Mayer. The film is based on a popular 1909 play by Maurice Leblanc and Francis de Croisset. Leblanc created the character Arsène Lupin, a charming, brilliant gentleman thief (in his case, actually a noble thief) in 1905. Lupin preys on rich villains.

== Plot ==
A robbery is reported at the house of Parisian millionaire Gourney-Martin to the police station. Detective Guerchard believes Arsène Lupin is the prime suspect, and dispatches officers who pursue a vehicle leaving the residence. Inside, they find the passenger is the Duke of Charmerace, who is tied up and claims to have been robbed. When Gourney-Martin returns, he confirms the Duke's identity, and states his possessions are stored at his country estate. Guerchard resentfully releases him.

The next day, Guerchard inspects footprint impressions left outside of Gourney-Martin's house, which he believes matches with Arsène Lupin. The Prefect of Police hands Guerchard a letter from Lupin, who plans to attend the Duke's hall that evening. In frustration, the Prefect orders that Lupin be arrested within a month.

At the ball, two bailiffs arrive to collect past payments from the Duke, who promises to pay them tomorrow. Inside, the Duke dances with Sonia, a young countess. Meanwhile, the bailiffs notice Guerchard is lurking inside the Duke's study and notify him. Since Guerchard isn't carrying his credentials, the Duke orders the bailiffs to have Guerchard kept inside his study at gunpoint. The Duke has his birthday cake brought into the ballroom while the lights are off, where several guests have their jewelry stolen.

Certain that the Duke is Arsène Lupin, Guerchard learns from Sonia that Gourney-Martin has invited her and the Duke to leave for the country estate tonight. There, the Duke sneaks into Gourney-Martin's study and finds him checking his safe; the Duke is told that the safe lock contains an electrical shock. The next morning, Gourney-Martin receives a letter from Arsène Lupin, who threatens to steal from him at midnight because he was a war profiteer. Frightened, Gourney-Martin sends for Guerchard's officers to protect his estate. When the said robbery doesn't happen, Guerchard is handed the front key to the estate. While the Duke has dinner and spends the night with Sonia, Lupin's men steal Gourney-Martin's paintings.

The next day, Gourney-Martin learns he has been robbed, but Guerchard has Lupin's men apprehended and interrogated. However, they refuse to confirm Arsène Lupin's identity. Guerchard questions Sonia, whose real name is "Sophie Krellberg" and is an undercover agent on parole for swindling. Sonia confesses she and the Duke were together the entire night, but Guerchard does not believe her. Suddenly, a rock breaks through the window containing another message from Lupin, demanding his men be released or he will steal the Mona Lisa from the Louvre.

At the Louvre, the real Mona Lisa is placed inside the vault, but after a diversion occurs, Guerchard finds the vault has been opened and the painting stolen. Guerchard discovers Lupin had disguised himself as Laurent, an elderly flower seller. At the Duke's hideout outside of Paris, he plans to escape but Guerchard arrives to arrest him. The Duke confirms he is Arsène Lupin, and bargains the real painting for the release of his men. Guerchard compromises until the Duke bargains for his own release in exchange for Guerchard's daughter Maria, who has been kidnapped, to be freed. Guerchard refuses to bargain, but the Duke releases Maria anyway.

On their way to police headquarters, the Duke reveals where he stored Gourey-Martin's jewels and how he obtained Guerchard's shoes. Guerchard next mentions that he failed to arrest a criminal when he jumped into the Seine. The Duke confirms the story when he attempts to jump into the river where Guerchard fires four shots at him and hears him scream. Guerchard offers to resign, but the Prefect refuses to accept it.

At a jewelry store, the Duke (who survived) and Sonia shop for gold rings. There, Lupin jokingly says: "wouldn't old Guerchard love to see me buying jewelry?"

== Cast ==
- John Barrymore as the Duke of Charmerace
- Lionel Barrymore as Detective Guerchard
- Karen Morley as Sonia
- John Miljan as Prefect of Police
- Tully Marshall as Gourney-Martin
- Henry Armetta as Sheriff's man
- George Davis as Sheriff's man
- John Davidson as Butler
- James Mack as Laurent
- Mary Jane Irving as Marie
- Olaf Hytten as Party Guest (uncredited)
- Leo White as Jeweler (uncredited)

== Box office ==
The film grossed a total (domestic and foreign) of $1,110,000 (equivalent to $26,200,000 in 2025): $595,000 from the US and Canada and $515,000 elsewhere. It made a profit of $245,000.

== See also ==
- John Barrymore filmography
- Lionel Barrymore filmography
