= An Alien Enemy =

1918 silent film

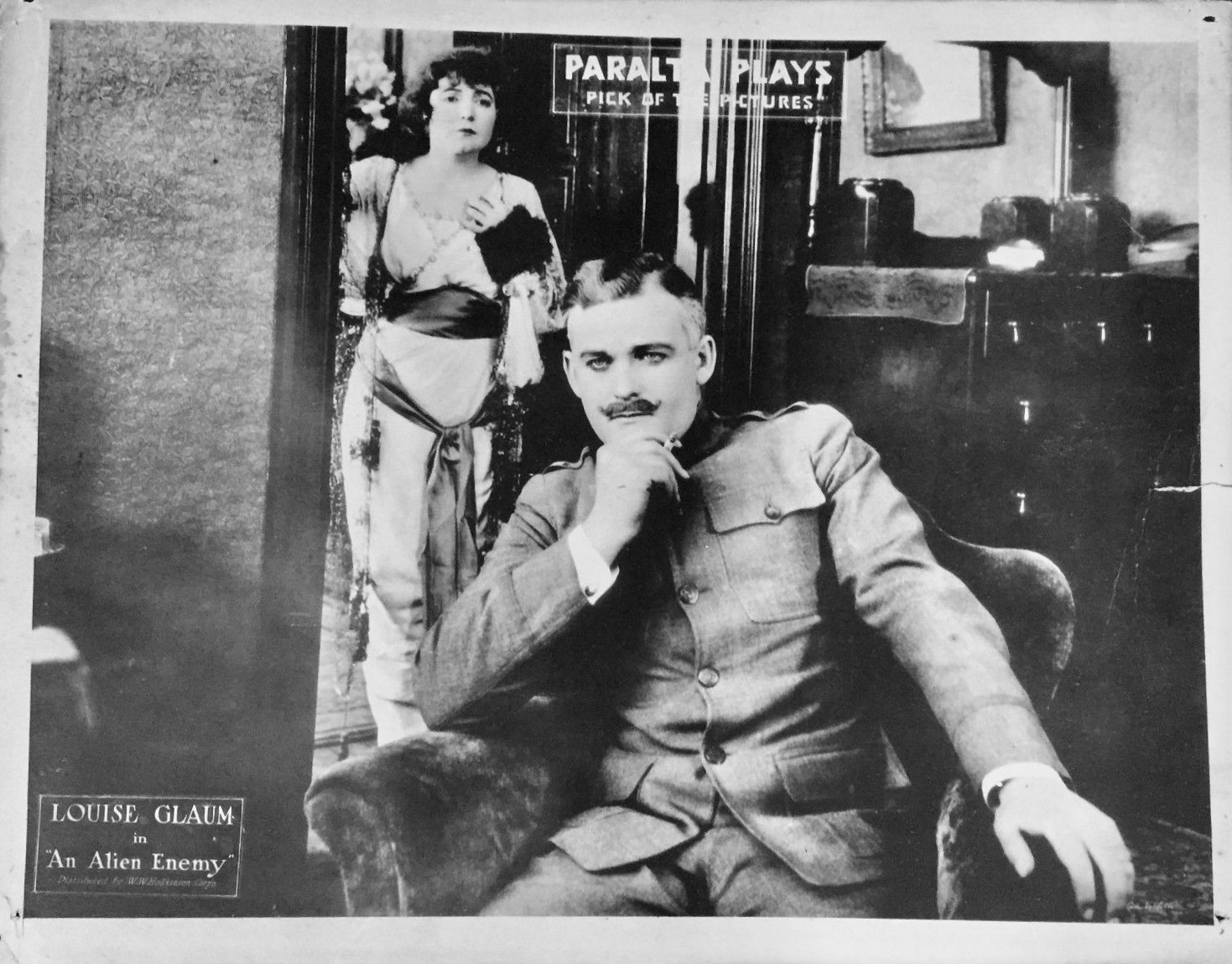
- Directed by: Wallace Worsley
- Written by: Monte M. Katterjohn
- Starring: Louise Glaum; Mary Jane Irving; Thurston Hall
- Cinematography: L. Guy Wilky
- Production company: Paralta Plays
- Distributed by: Hodkinson Pictures
- Release date: April 1, 1918
- Running time: 70 minutes
- Country: United States
- Languages: Silent; English intertitles

An Alien Enemy is a lost 1918 American silent war drama film directed by Wallace Worsley and starring Louise Glaum, Mary Jane Irving and Thurston Hall.

== Cast ==
- Louise Glaum as Neysa von Igel/Frau Meyer
- Mary Jane Irving as Fräulein Bertha Meyer
- Thurston Hall as David J. Hale
- Albert Allardt as Emil Koenig
- Charles Hammond as Adolph Schmidt
- Jay Morley as Mayor Samuel J. Putnam
- Roy Laidlaw as Lewis Meyer
- Joseph J. Dowling as Baron von Mecklin
- Clifford Alexander as Wireless Operator

== Preservation ==
With no holdings located in archives, An Alien Enemy is considered a lost film.

== Bibliography ==
- Slide, Anthony. Aspects of American Film History Prior to 1920. Scarecrow Press, 1978.
