= The Crimson Challenge =

1922 film

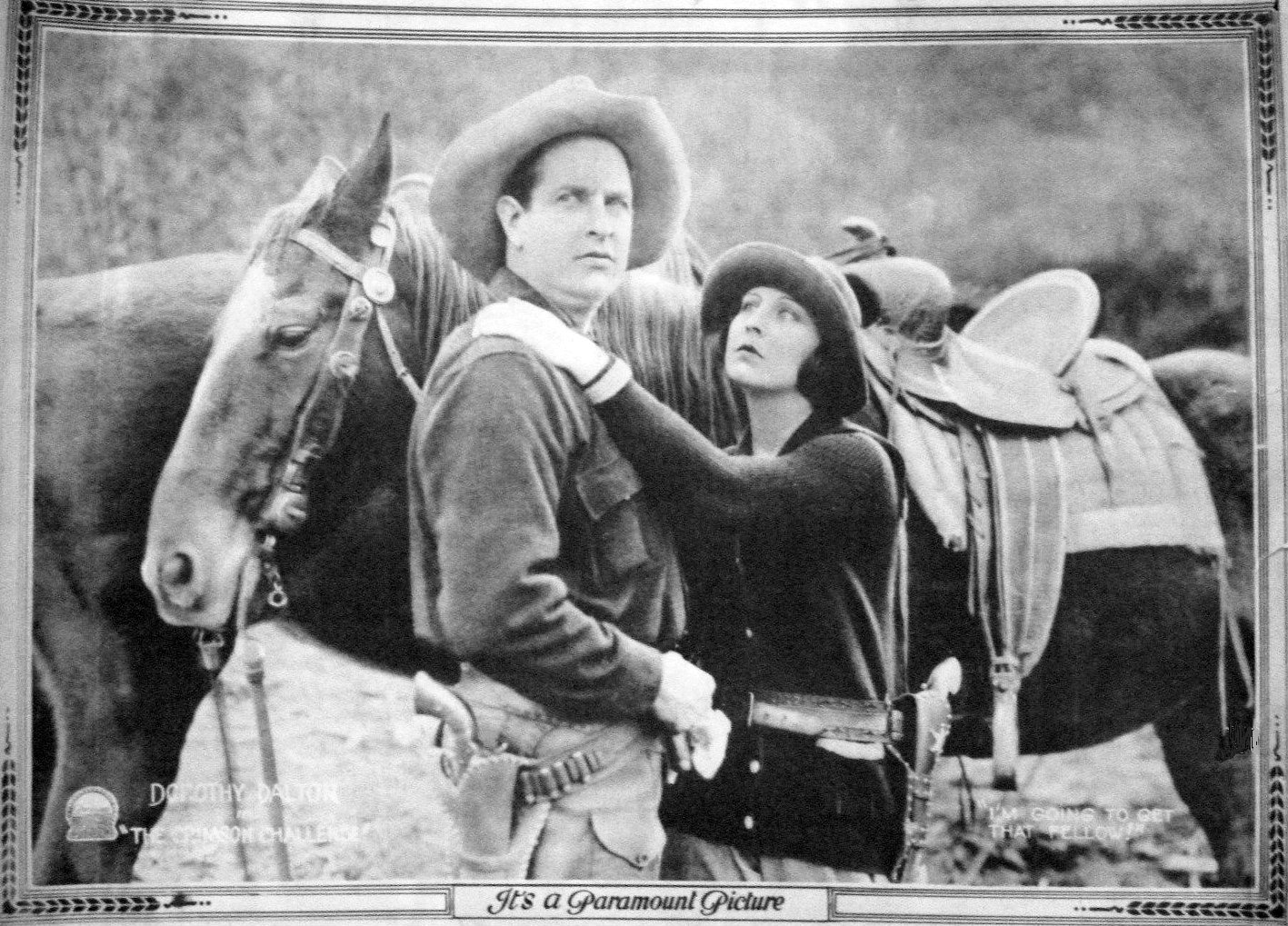
- Lobby card
- Directed by: Paul Powell
- Screenplay by: Vingie E. Roe; Beulah Marie Dix
- Produced by: Adolph Zukor
- Starring: Dorothy Dalton; Jack Mower; Will Walling; Howard Ralston; Clarence Burton; George Field; Beulah Dark Cloud
- Cinematography: Harry Perry
- Production company: Famous Players–Lasky Corporation
- Distributed by: Paramount Pictures
- Release date: April 2, 1922
- Running time: 50 minutes
- Country: United States
- Languages: Silent; English intertitles

The Crimson Challenge is a lost 1922 American silent Western film directed by Paul Powell and written by Vingie E. Roe and Beulah Marie Dix. The film stars Dorothy Dalton, Jack Mower, Will Walling, Howard Ralston, Clarence Burton, George Field, and Beulah Dark Cloud. The film was released on April 2, 1922, by Paramount Pictures.

== Plot ==
As described in a film magazine, Tharon Last is the daughter of Jim Last, the last man who led the settlers of the valley against the oppression of Basil "Buck" Courtrey, whose rustlers terrorized the community. Courtrey admires Tharon, the only woman of the valley that he considers fit to be his mate, and murders her father to deprive her of his protection. Tharon swears revenge and becomes leader of the settlers, which results in a long struggle with many fights.

== Cast ==
- Dorothy Dalton as Tharon Last
- Jack Mower as Billy
- Will Walling as Jim Last (credited as Will R. Walling)
- Howard Ralston as Clive
- Clarence Burton as Black Bart
- George Field as Wylackie
- Beulah Dark Cloud as Anita (credited as Mrs Dark Cloud)
- Fred Huntley as Confora (credited as Fred Huntly)
- Irene Hunt as Ellen
- Frank Campeau as Basil Courtrey (uncredited)
