= USS Valley Forge =

USS Valley Forge may refer to:

- USS Valley Forge (CV-37) was the planned name of an Essex-class aircraft carrier, renamed USS Princeton prior to launch
- USS Valley Forge (CV-45) was an Essex-class aircraft carrier, commissioned in 1946, converted to an amphibious assault ship (LPH-8) and decommissioned in 1970
- USS Valley Forge (CG-50) was a Ticonderoga-class guided missile cruiser commissioned in 1986 and decommissioned in 2004
