= Firecake =

Type of quick bread eaten during the American Revolutionary Wars

Firecake or Fire cake was a type of quick bread eaten by soldiers in the French and Indian and the American Revolutionary Wars. They were made from a mixture of flour, water and salt and baked on a rock in the fire or in the ashes.

== Ingredients ==
The firecake dough was made by mixing flour, water and salt, roughly in the proportions 2.3 parts flour to 1 part water, forming a thick damp dough.

== Baking ==
The dough was formed into thick flat cakes the size of a hand. The cakes were then put on a flat stone and the stone was placed upright near the fire, or put in the ashes. After baking the firecakes were charred on the outside and doughy inside. For storage they were baked until dry and hard.

== Usage ==
Firecakes were used as a not very popular substitute when the commissary failed to issue bread to the soldiers. They were then issued flour and had to make the bread themselves.
