= Polly Cooper =

Oneida woman

- Citizenship: Oneida people
- Known for: Feeding soldiers at Valley Forge during the American Revolutionary War

Polly Cooper was an Oneida woman from the New York colony who took part in an expedition to aid the starving Continental Army during the American Revolutionary War. She was among 47 Oneida and Seneca people who carried bushels of corn 250 miles (400 km) to Valley Forge from late April into May 1778. She taught them how to make a soup with the corn, nuts, and fruits to increase its nutritional value. Not wanting to be paid for her service, she was presented with a black shawl, which has been esteemed by Cooper and the Oneida people. It has been loaned to the Oneida Nation Cultural Center. Cooper is depicted in a bronze statue, "Allies in War, Partners in Peace", made by Edward Hlavka. It is on display at the National Museum of the American Indian of the Smithsonian Institution.

== American Revolution ==
The Oneida had a friendly relationship with George Washington and his army. They supported the American cause due to the leadership of the Presbyterian preacher, Samuel Kirkland and their disdain for the British appointed native superintendents, Sir William Johnson and his son-in-law Guy Johnson.

The Oneida and Tuscarora people played a significant role in the American Revolutionary War. They fought and died with the Continental Army, they were scouts, and they provided intelligence of British troop movements during the war. Doing so meant that they fought against the other nations of the Iroquois Confederacy who sided with the British. In 1777, the Seneca, some Mohawk, and Cuyoga officially chose to fight with the British.

=== Valley Forge ===
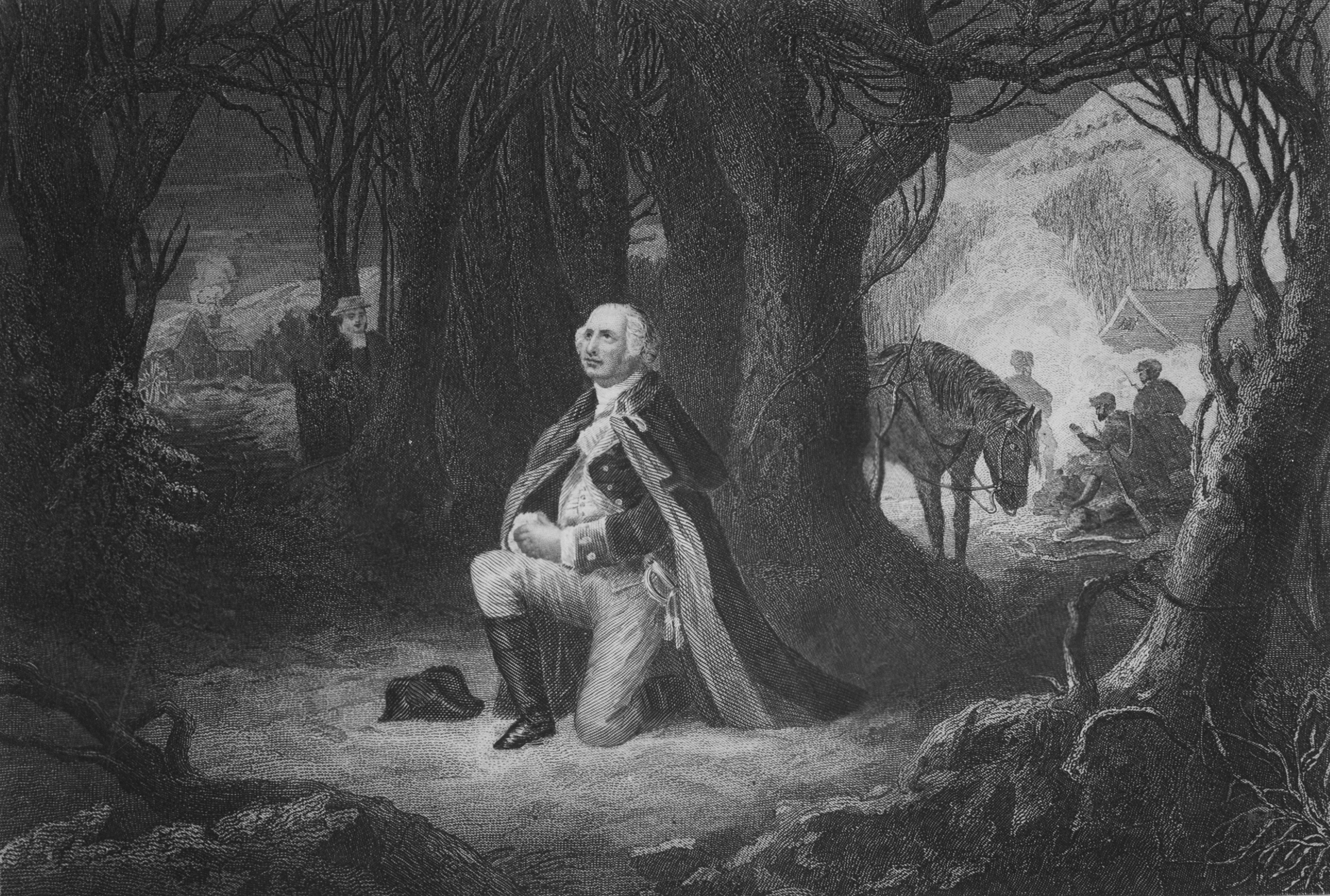
John C. McRae, Valley Forge prayer, with General George Washington praying at Valley Forge, 1866, engraving, based on a painting by Henry Brueckner

On April 25, a group of forty-seven Oneida and Seneca men, along with Polly Cooper, left with Louis de Tousard, carrying bushels of corn and supplies 250 miles (400 km) to assist Washington at Valley Forge, Pennsylvania. (Note: Polly Cooper is said to be also known as Dolly Cobus, but there is no information that says that Dolly Cobus is Polly Cooper and the information is limited. There was also a Polly Cooper who fought in the War of 1812 and received a pension, but she was 31 at the time, born about 1782.) They walked through cold weather and deep snow to reach the soldiers who were starving and dying of exposure. They arrived in May 1778. Cooper taught the Continental Army soldiers how to make the native's hulled corn soup, mixed with nuts and fruits to improve its nutritional quality. Cooper stayed to care for ill soldiers. She also became Washington's cook. (Note: Loew states that Dolly Cobus, also known as Polly Cooper, cooked for Washington in Philadelphia.)

=== The shawl ===
The Continental Army tried to pay Polly Cooper for her valiant service, but she refused any recompense, stating that it was her duty to help her friends in their time of need. According to Oneida oral tradition, Cooper was given a bonnet and a dark shawl by Martha Washington, who was at the encampment until June. (Note: There are other theories, like Martha Washington invited Cooper to Philadelphia, or a dark brown gossimer shawl may have been purchased by the other officer's wives according to Valley Forge staff. The National Park Service published a document about women at Valley Forge that said that Martha Washington gave Cooper the shawl. Martha, at the encampment until June 1778, was known for keeping people's spirits up. It is also said that she saw a shawl in a window and Congress paid for it.)

The shawl is still in the care of the Cooper descendants and is in nearly perfect condition. It has been loaned for display on special occasions at the Shako:wi, The Oneida Nation Cultural Center.

=== After the war ===
After the war, the Oneida clans lost most of their land. The Oneida people's role in American history has been understated or forgotten for two centuries. According to Carlton E. Spitzer, modern television documentaries generally exclude the roles that Native Americans and Black Americans played in the colonial war. In 2001, Valley Forge was replacing the film it shows visitors with one that reflects the role Native Americans and black soldiers played in America's history.

== Legacy ==
- The Polly Cooper Chapter of the National Society Daughters of the American Revolution is located in Chappaqua, New York.

External image
- "Allies in War, Partners in Peace", by Edward Hlavka, Smithsonian Institution

- In 2004, the Oneida Indian Nation commissioned a bronze statue by sculptor, Edward Hlavka to share the oral tradition of Polly Cooper. The twenty-two foot tall, 2,200 pound monument "Allies in War, Partners in Peace" was gifted to the Smithsonian Institution's National Museum of the American Indian and is displayed on the Oneida floor. It depicts Polly Cooper carrying a basket of corn with Chief Skenandoa, General George Washington, and two Oneidas at Valley Forge. Skenandoa represents the warriors who fought with the patriots during the Revolutionary War.
- In 2005, she was inducted into the Hall of Fame of the Oneida County Historical Society.
- The 2026 Native American Dollar features Polly Cooper and George Washington at Valley Forge.

== Bibliography ==
- Glatthaar, Joseph T.; Martin, James Kirby (2006). Forgotten allies : the Oneida Indians and the American revolution. New York: Hill and Wang. ISBN 978-0-8090-4601-0.
- Loew, Patty (2001). Indian nations of Wisconsin : histories of endurance and renewal. Madison: Wisconsin Historical Society Press. ISBN 978-0-87020-332-9.
