= Beulah Dark Cloud =

American actress

- Born: Beulah T. Filson; March 28, 1887; Lake George, New York, USA
- Died: December 29, 1945 (aged 58); Thermolite, California, USA
- Other names: Bright Eyes, Beulah Tahamont
- Occupation: Actress
- Relatives: Dark Cloud (father); Bertha Parker Pallan (daughter)

Beulah Dark Cloud (also known as Beulah Tahamont) was a Native American actress and performer who appeared in several silent films by D. W. Griffith.

== Biography ==
Beulah Dark Cloud was born Beulah T. Filson on March 28, 1887, in Lake George, New York, to Elijah "Dark Cloud" Tahamont and Margaret "Soaring Dove" Camp, who were members of the Abenaki tribe. Educated primarily in Montreal, Canada, she began performing at a young age. She was reported to be the first Native American student to attend New York's public schools when she enrolled at P.S. 45 in 1901. By 1912, she and her father had relocated to Los Angeles to appear in films directed by D. W. Griffith. Health problems eventually forced her to retire from acting.

She was married to Dr. Arthur Caswell Gawasowaneh Parker on 28 April 1904.

She died on December 29, 1945, in Thermalito, California.

== Selected filmography ==
- Desert Gold (1919)
- The Crimson Challenge (1922)
