= John Kellette =

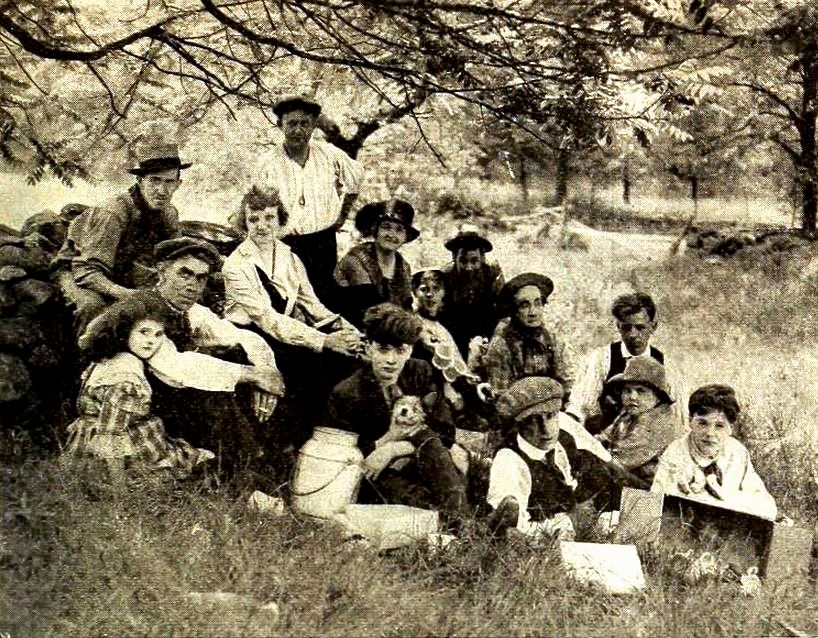
- 1919 Paramount film crew at lunch, with director John Kellette in center in first row

Background information
- Born: John William Kellette; June 1873; Lowell, Massachusetts, United States
- Died: 7 August 1922 (aged 48–49)
- Genres: Broadway musicals, revues, show tunes
- Occupations: Songwriter, composer, actor

John William Kellette (June 1873 – August 7, 1922) was an American songwriter. Kellette's most famous composition was "I'm Forever Blowing Bubbles," which was introduced in the musical revue The Passing Show of 1918, which he wrote with James Brockman, James Kendis, and Nat Vincent. He also worked as a film director and acted in the films A Child of the Wild (1917) and Mercy on a Crutch (1915).

== Filmography ==
- Mercy on a Crutch (1915)
- A Child of the Wild (1917), as A Tramp
- My Little Sister (1919 film), one of directors credited
