= Silver Threads Among the Gold (disambiguation) =

Silver Threads Among the Gold is a popular American song from 1873.

Silver Threads Among the Gold may also refer to:

- Silver Threads Among the Gold (1911 film), directed by Edwin S. Porter
- Silver Threads Among the Gold (1915 film), starring countertenor Richard Jose
