= The Bitter Truth (film) =

1917 film by Kenean Buel

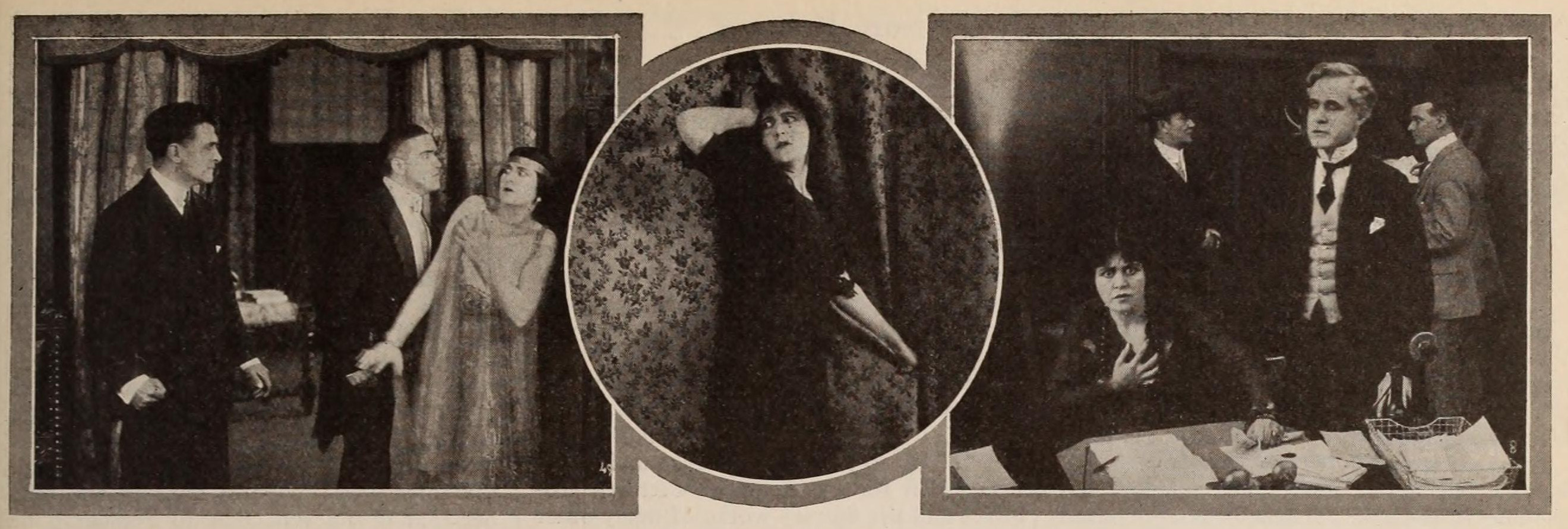
- Scenes from the film
- Directed by: Kenean Buel
- Written by: Mary Murillo
- Produced by: William Fox
- Starring: Virginia Pearson; Jack Hopkins; William H. Tooker
- Cinematography: Frank Kugler
- Production company: Fox Film
- Distributed by: Fox Film
- Release date: January 14, 1917
- Running time: 60 minutes
- Country: United States
- Languages: Silent; English intertitles

The Bitter Truth is a 1917 American silent drama film directed by Kenean Buel and starring Virginia Pearson, Jack Hopkins and William H. Tooker.

== Cast ==
- Virginia Pearson as Anne
- Jack Hopkins as Graves, a parson
- William H. Tooker as Judge Marcus
- Alice May as Martha Marcus
- Sidney D'Albrook as The Parson

== Bibliography ==
- Solomon, Aubrey. The Fox Film Corporation, 1915-1935: A History and Filmography. McFarland, 2011.
