= Troublemakers (1917 film) =

Trouble Makers
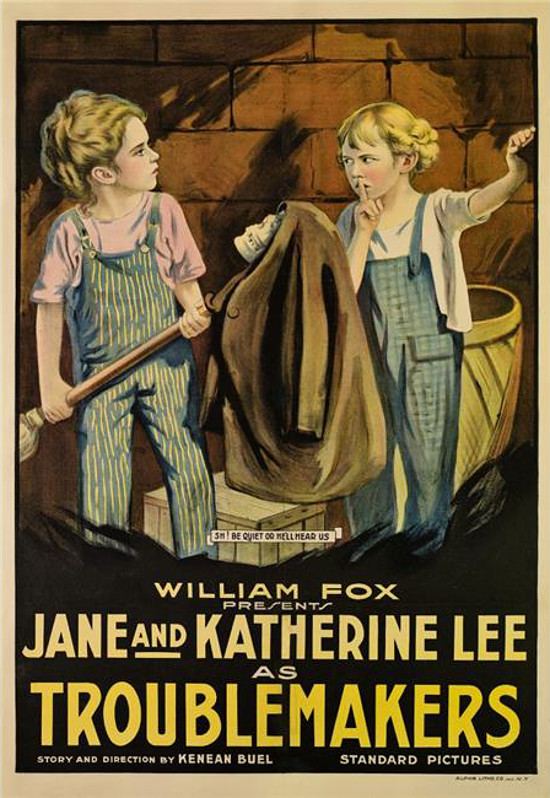
- Film poster
- Directed by: Kenean Buel
- Written by: Kenean Buel
- Produced by: William Fox
- Starring: Lillian Concord; Jane Lee; Katherine Lee
- Cinematography: Leo Rossi
- Distributed by: Fox Film Corporation
- Release date: December 9, 1917
- Running time: 7 reels
- Country: USA
- Language: Silent...English intertitles

Troublemakers is a lost 1917 silent film drama directed by Kenean Buel, and starring sisters Jane and Katherine Lee. It was produced and distributed by Fox Film Corporation. The film is described by Motography as a comedy drama.

It had seven reels.

== Cast ==
- Lillian Concord - Mrs. Lehr
- Jane Lee - Jane
- Katherine Lee - Katherine
- Richard Turner - Daniel Whitcomb
- Robert Vivian - Job Jenkins
- William T. Hayes - Isaac White
- Stuart Sage - "Manny"
- Frances Miller - Cynthia

== Production ==
The film was "especially written for the Lee sisters".

== Release ==
Motography reports that the film "established a record for big business for a week's run at Philadelphia's leading picture theater, the Palace, during the week January 7–12. Seven performances every day were given and at five of these the S. R. O. sign was needed."

== Survival status ==
With no known existing copy, the film is considered to be lost.

== See also ==
- 1937 Fox vault fire
