= A Desperate Chance =

1913 film directed by Kenean Buel

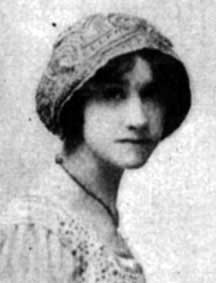
- The film's costar Alice Hollister
- Directed by: Kenean Buel
- Starring: Earle Foxe; Alice Hollister; Robert G. Vignola; Helen Lidroth; Miriam Cooper
- Release date: 1913
- Country: United States
- Languages: Silent film English intertitles

A Desperate Chance is a 1913 American silent short starring Earle Foxe and Alice Hollister. Directed by Kenean Buel, the drama features the same cast and crew of the film that preceded it that year, A Sawmill Hazard.

== Cast ==
- Alice Hollister
- Earle Foxe
- Helen Lindroth
- Robert G. Vignola
- Miriam Cooper
