= Leslie Austin =

English actor

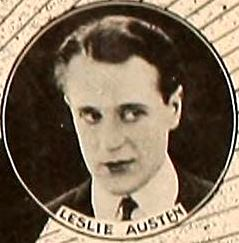
- Austin from an ad for Democracy: The Vision Restored (1920)
- Born: 21 November 1885; London, UK
- Died: May 1974 (aged 89)
- Other name: Leslie Austen

Leslie Austin (21 November 1885 – May 1974) was an English actor. He appeared in 30 films between 1915 and 1930.

He was born in London, England.

== Filmography ==
Year	Title	Role	Notes
1915	Her Reckoning	Dick Leslie	
1916	The City of Failing Light	Gray's Secretary	
1916	The Voice in the Night	Mr Wayne	Short film
1916	The Greater Wrong	James Cannon	Short film
1917	A Man and the Woman	James Duncan	
1917	The Auction of Virtue	Jerry	
1917	The Final Payment	Neccola	
1917	Two Little Imps	Billy Parke	
1917	The Courage of the Common Place	Johnny McClean	
1918	Mrs. Dane's Defense	Lionel Cartaret	
1918	American Buds	Captain Bob Dutton	
1918	Caught in the Act	Langdon Trevor	
1919	Marie, Ltd.	Blair Carson	
1919	My Little Sister	Eric	
1920	Dr. Jekyll and Mr. Hyde	Danvers Carew	
1920	Democracy: The Vision Restored	John Fortune	
1921	The Silver Lining	Robert Ellington	
1921	Cousin Kate	Rev. James Bartlett	
1921	Reckless Wives	George Cameron	
1922	Martha	Lionel	Short film
1922	The Darling of the Rich	Mason Lawrence	
1922	Tense Moments from Opera	Lionel	
1923	The Governor's Lady	Robert Hayes	
1923	Jamestown	John Rolfe	Short film
1923	Vincennes	George Rogers Clark	Short film
1924	Let Not Man Put Asunder	Harry Vassall	
1924	The Masked Dancer	Robert Powell	
1924	Sandra	Rev. William J. Hapgood	
1924	On Leave of Absence	Pat Britton	Short film
1925	The Unknown Lover	Fred Wagner	
1930	Young Man of Manhattan	Dwight Knowles	
