= The Scarlet Letter (1917 film) =

1917 silent film adaption of The Scarlet Letter

- Directed by: Carl Harbaugh
- Written by: Carl Harbaugh
- Based on: The Scarlet Letter by Nathaniel Hawthorne
- Starring: Mary Martin; Stuart Holmes; Dan Mason; Kittens Reichert
- Cinematography: Georges Benoit
- Production company: Fox Film Corporation
- Distributed by: Fox Film Corporation
- Release date: February 12, 1917
- Running time: 55 minutes (5 reels)
- Country: United States
- Language: Silent (English intertitles)

The Scarlet Letter is a 1917 American silent drama film directed and written by Carl Harbaugh. It is based on the 1850 eponymous novel by Nathaniel Hawthorne, with some additional plot added taking place before the events of the novel. It was written and directed by Carl Harbaugh. The film was released by Fox Film Corporation on February 12, 1917.

The film used the novel's text to create subtitles, and the February 10, 1917 issue of The Moving Picture World called it "as nearly flawless as it is humanly possible for it to be."

== Plot ==
In old Puritan Boston some two hundred and fifty years ago, a girl named Pearl was born. Her mother was Hester Prynne. Her father was "unknown." The Rev. Wilson and the Governor urge Hester to reveal the name of the child's father. She refuses and the Rev. Arthur Dimmesdale is asked to plead with her. She does not heed the pastor's request to reveal the name of the father of her child. A bent old man enters the square. He recognizes Hester and she him. Hate sweeps his face. Hester is taken back to prison and the old man, Chillingworth, is admitted to her cell as a physician. He is Hester's husband. He berates her and leaves, threatening to drag her lover from his hiding. The next day Hester goes to live in a cottage beyond the settlement. She endures insults and humiliation. Meantime, Rev. Dimmesdale's health gives way under a strange malady. Chillingworth is told to care for him.

Years pass and Pearl grows into girlhood. The heads of the colony seek to separate her from Hester and raise her under the church. Hester resists in vain, but Dimmesdale's plea saves the little family. Chillingworth comments on the earnestness of the pastor's plea. A few days later, Dimmesdale sees Pearl in the cemetery near his home. With burrs, she has formed an "A" on her breast. Dimmesdale staggers to his bed and falls unconscious. To revive the pastor, Chillingworth opens his shirt. He seems to see a scarlet "A" branded on Dimmesdale's chest. Chillingworth glares with fiendish glee. Regaining consciousness late in the night, the pastor runs into the square and mounts the pillory, crying out to the sleeping town. He faints and recovers as Hester and Pearl enter at dawn. He calls them and together they stand on the pillory. When the town begins to stir they go to the beach. Hester begs Dimmesdale to flee with her and the child to another land. The pastor embraces the woman and child. Chillingworth watches from behind a rock. In parting, Hester casts away the scarlet "A." Chillingworth cries out to the town that Hester has bewitched Dimmesdale. Guards seize her in her cottage and drag her to the square. Attracted by the tumult, Dimmesdale rushes into the square as Hester is being tied to the stake. Pushing through the frenzied mob he stands beside her. As he confesses himself the father of Pearl, he tears open his shirt and reveals an "A" seared on his chest. The throng draws back in awe. Hester frees herself and catches Dimmesdale as he falls. She lifts his head into her lap; he opens his eyes, kisses Hester and Pearl and dies.

== Cast ==
- Mary Martin as Hester Prynne
- Stuart Holmes as Arthur Dimmesdale
- Dan Mason as Roger Chillingworth
- Kittens Reichert as Pearl
- Edward Hoyt as the Reverend Wilson
- Robert Vivian as the Governor
- Florence Ashbrooke as Mistress Hibbons

== Preservation ==
The film survives as a incomplete print with only one reel in the George Eastman Museum film archive.
