= Daredevil Kate =

1916 film by Kenean Buel

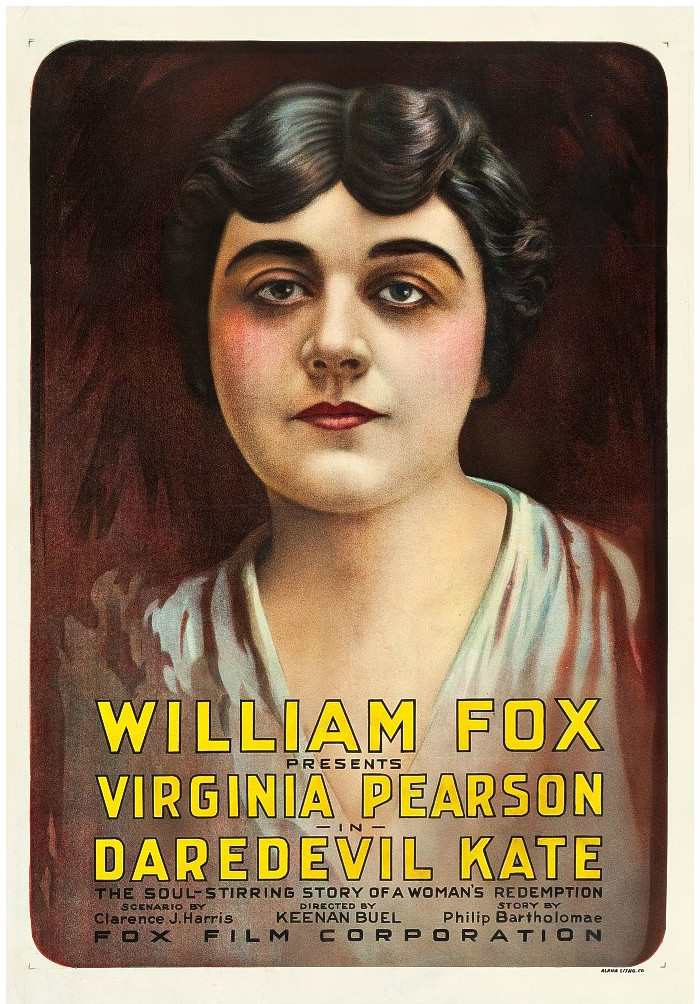
- poster
- Directed by: Kenean Buel
- Written by: Clarence J. Harris
- Based on: the play Daredevil Kate by Philip Bartholomae
- Produced by: William Fox
- Starring: Virginia Pearson
- Cinematography: Frank Kugler
- Distributed by: Fox Film Corporation
- Release date: August 21, 1916
- Running time: 6 reels
- Country: USA
- Language: Silent..English intertitles

Daredevil Kate is a lost 1916 silent feature film directed by Kenean Buel and starring Virginia Pearson. It was produced and distributed by Fox Film Corporation.

== Cast ==
- Virginia Pearson - Kate
- Victor Sutherland - Cliff Stone
- Mary G. Martin - Irene
- Kenneth Hunter - John West
- Alex Shannon - Green
- Leighton Stark - Kilmer
- Fred R. Stanton - Bently
- Jane Lee - Irene's child
- Katherine Lee - Irene's child
- Minna Philips - Mrs. Stone

== See also ==
- 1937 Fox vault fire
