= My Little Sister =

My Little Sister can refer to:

- My Little Sister (1919 film), an American silent film
- My Little Sister (2020 film), a Swiss drama film
