= Walter Law (actor) =

American actor (1876–1940)

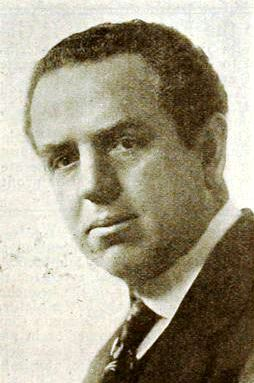
- Law in 1919
- Born: Walter W. Law; March 26, 1876
- Died: August 9, 1940 (aged 64); Hollywood, California, U.S.
- Occupations: Film and stage actor
- Years active: 1915–1936
- Spouse: Betty Marvin

Walter W. Law (March 26, 1876 – August 9, 1940) was an American film and stage actor. He appeared in over 40 films between 1915 and 1936.

== Early life ==
Walter W. Law was born on March 26, 1876. He grew up on Euclid Avenue in Greenville, Ohio. He moved to Dayton as a young man. He worked at the Mose Cohen clothing store in Gem City. He then worked at the Victoria Theatre.

== Career ==
Law worked as a stage actor. He played with the "Sign of the Cross" Company and toured as a vaudeville actor for several years. He headlined with Keith Theaters. He played the priest in the play The Seal of Silence. He was also a film actor and worked for William Fox of Fox Film in Fort Lee, New Jersey.

In 1920, Law moved to Hollywood, Los Angeles, and began starring in films. He starred in the film Whoopee! with Eddie Cantor. He also starred in The Thirteenth Chair, Our Daily Bread, The Miracle Man and Ken Maynard western films.

== Personal life ==
Law married Betty Marvin. He died on August 8, 1940, aged 64, at his apartment on Franklin Avenue in Hollywood. He was cremated at Hollywood Cemetery Crematory.

== Filmography ==
Year	Title	Role	Notes
1915	The Road o' Strife		
1915	The District Attorney	General Ruggles	
1915	The Climbers	Mr. Ryder	
1915	The Great Ruby	Duke of St. Edmunds	
1915	The Rights of Man: a Story of War's Red Blotch	American Ambassador	
1916	The Evangelist	Sir James Nuneham	
1916	The Unwelcome Mother	Mason	
1916	Her Double Life	Longshoreman	
1916	The War Bride's Secret	Robin Gray	
1916	Romeo and Juliet	Friar Laurence	
1917	The Darling of Paris	Claude Frallo	
1917	Sister Against Sister	Huxley	
1917	Her Greatest Love	Prince Zuoroff	
1917	Heart and Soul	Drummond	
1917	Camille	Count de Varville	
1917	The Heart of a Lion	Tex	
1918	Stolen Honor	Honorable Richard Belfield	
1918	The Forbidden Path	Mr. Lynde	
1918	Queen of the Sea	King Boreas	
1918	A Perfect Lady	John Griswold	
1919	The Miracle Man		
1919	The Thirteenth Chair	Inspector Donohue	
1920	If I Were King	Thibault	
1922	The Great Alone	Winston Sassoon	
1922	The Forgotten Law	Detective	
1923	The Flying Dutchman	Peter Van Dorn	
1924	Janice Meredith	General Charles Lee	
1925	Clothes Make the Pirate	Dixie Bull	
1930	Whoopee!	Jud Morgan	
1932	Between Fighting Men	Dad Thompson	
1934	Midnight Alibi	Elderly Guest	Uncredited
1934	We Live Again	Peasant	Uncredited
1936	The Adventures of Frank Merriwell	Murray Belwood	Serial, [Chs. 4–9], (final film role)
