= Wildness of Youth =

1922 film by Ivan Abramson

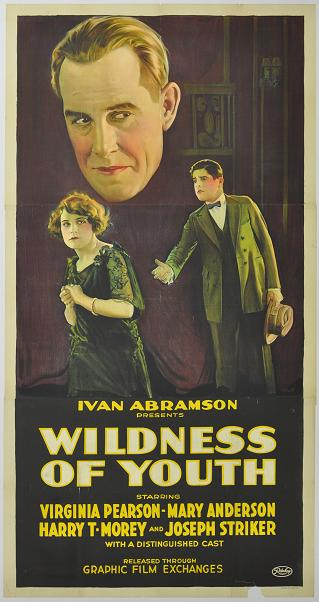
- Directed by: Ivan Abramson
- Produced by: Graphic Film Corporation
- Starring: Virginia Pearson; Harry T. Morey; Mary Anderson
- Release date: September 29, 1922
- Country: United States
- Languages: Silent film English intertitles

Wildness of Youth is a 1922 silent film directed by Ivan Abramson, starring Virginia Pearson, Harry T. Morey and Mary Anderson.

== Plot ==
Spoiled son Andrew Kane (Joseph Striker) competes with James Surbrun (Harry T. Morey) for the affections of wild child Julie Grayton (Mary Anderson). Kane is convicted of murdering Surbrun, but later exonerated.

== Cast ==
- Virginia Pearson as Louise Wesley
- Harry T. Morey as James Surbrun
- Mary Anderson as Julie Grayton
- Joseph Striker as Andrew Kane
- Thurston Hall as Edward Grayton
- Julia Swayne Gordon as Mrs. Martha Kane
- Bobby Connelly as Teddy Wesley
- Harry Southard as Dr. Carlyle Preston
- Madeline La Varre as Señora Gonzalez
- George J. Williams as Roger Moore

== Reception ==
Writer Carl Sandburg, who was a regular film critic in the 1920s, reviewed the film critically, writing that "the silly, the trashy, the obvious, the slipshod, the shoddy, it is here. ... It is the type of picture that leads to the comment, 'Movies are made for morons.'" Other more non-specific reviews were positive (as was typical of the era) calling it a "wonderful production." Industry-paper Film Daily found that the picture was better than some of Abramson's prior releases, and though "not high class entertainment", predicted it would probably do fairly well at the box office.

== Status ==
It is not known whether the film currently survives.
