= Jane and Katherine Lee =

American actresses

Jane Lee
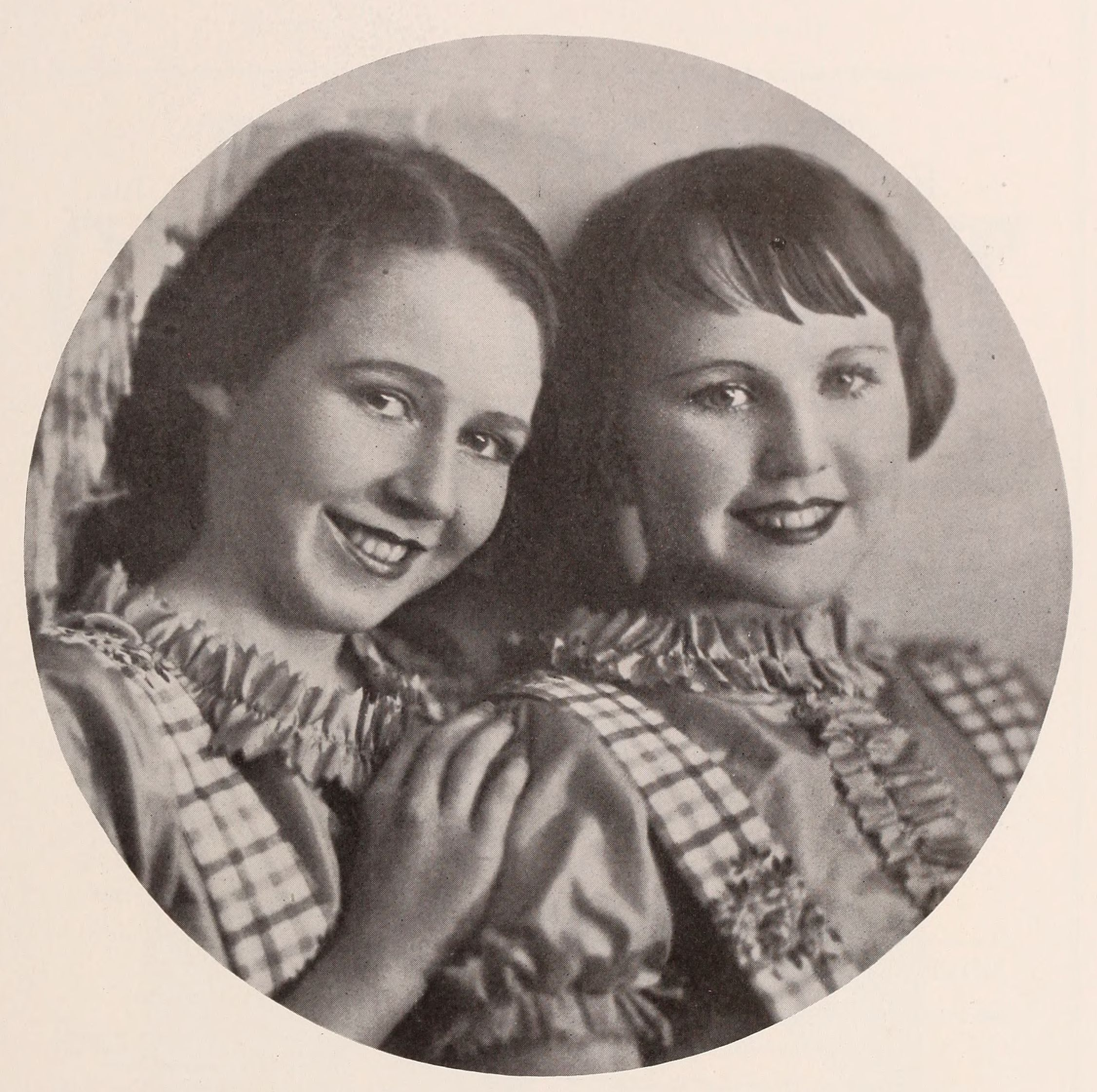
- Katherine and Jane Lee (left)
- Born: February 15, 1912; Dublin, Ireland or Glasgow, Scotland
- Died: March 7, 1957 (aged 45); Saint Clare's Hospital, Manhattan, New York City, U.S.
- Years active: 1914-1951
- Known for: Famous child actor for silent films and vaudeville theatre
- Spouse: James E. Grant (1933-1937) divorced

Katherine Lee
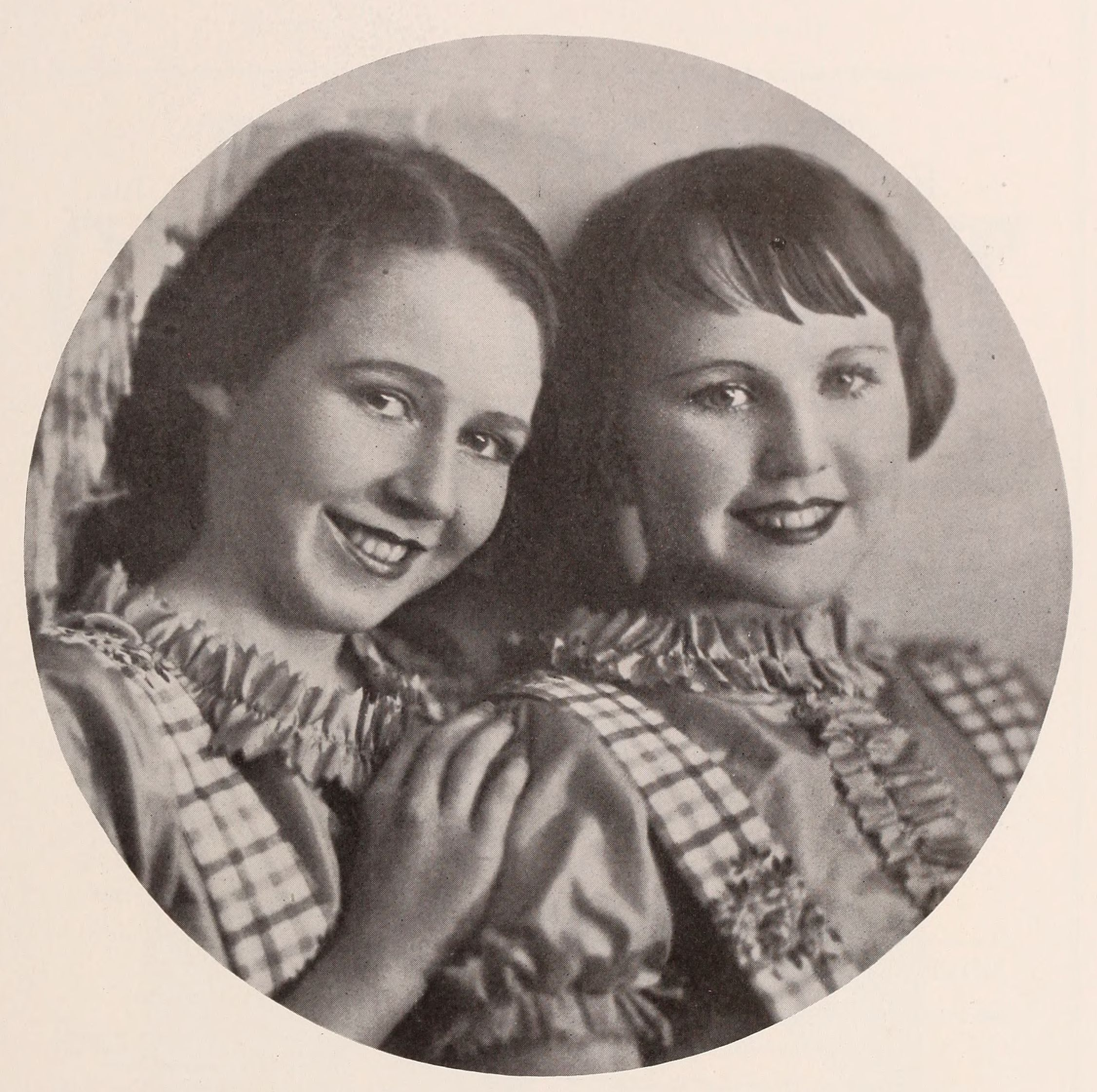
- Katherine (right and Jane Lee
- Born: February 14, 1909; Berlin, Germany
- Died: 1968; New York City, U.S.
- Years active: 1913-1924
- Known for: Famous child actor for silent films and vaudeville theatre
- Spouse: Ray Miller

Jane Lee (1912–1957) and Katherine Lee (1909–1968), sisters, were child stars in silent motion pictures and vaudeville theatre. They were also known as the "Baby Grands", "Lee Kids", or the "Fox Kiddies" for their appearances in Fox Film productions.

The Lee sisters were the children of American juggler Tommy Banahan and Irene Lee, an Irish dancer and occasional actor. During Tommy and Irene's European tour, Katherine was born in Berlin, Germany on February 14, 1909, and Jane born February 15, 1912, in either Dublin, Ireland, or Glasgow, Scotland. The sisters appeared in the original Neptune's Daughter, filmed in 1914. In 1915, Jane appeared with Valeska Suratt in The Soul of Broadway at Fox Studios. They both appeared in A Daughter of the Gods (1916), with Katherine's dramatic performance earning praise as a "child prodigy" and a "three-foot Fiske." In 1917, Jane and Katherine starred in two of Fox's "kiddie films", Troublemakers and Two Little Imps.

They appeared in Swat the Spy (1918), Tell It to the Marines (1918), and Smiles (1919). In 1919, they made the list of the Top Ten Money Making Stars Poll.

Jane and Katherine continued performing in vaudeville throughout the 1920s and into early 1930s; their act as adults was filmed by Warner Bros. for Vitaphone Billboard (1936). Jane later had uncredited roles in the sound motion pictures Knock on Any Door (1949), Cheaper By the Dozen (1950), and Comin' Round The Mountain (1951).

Jane married actor James E. Grant in New York on April 5, 1933, and they divorced in 1937. She died in New York's St. Clare's Hospital on March 7, 1957; her married name at the time was St. John. Katherine married Ray Miller of New York, and died in 1968.

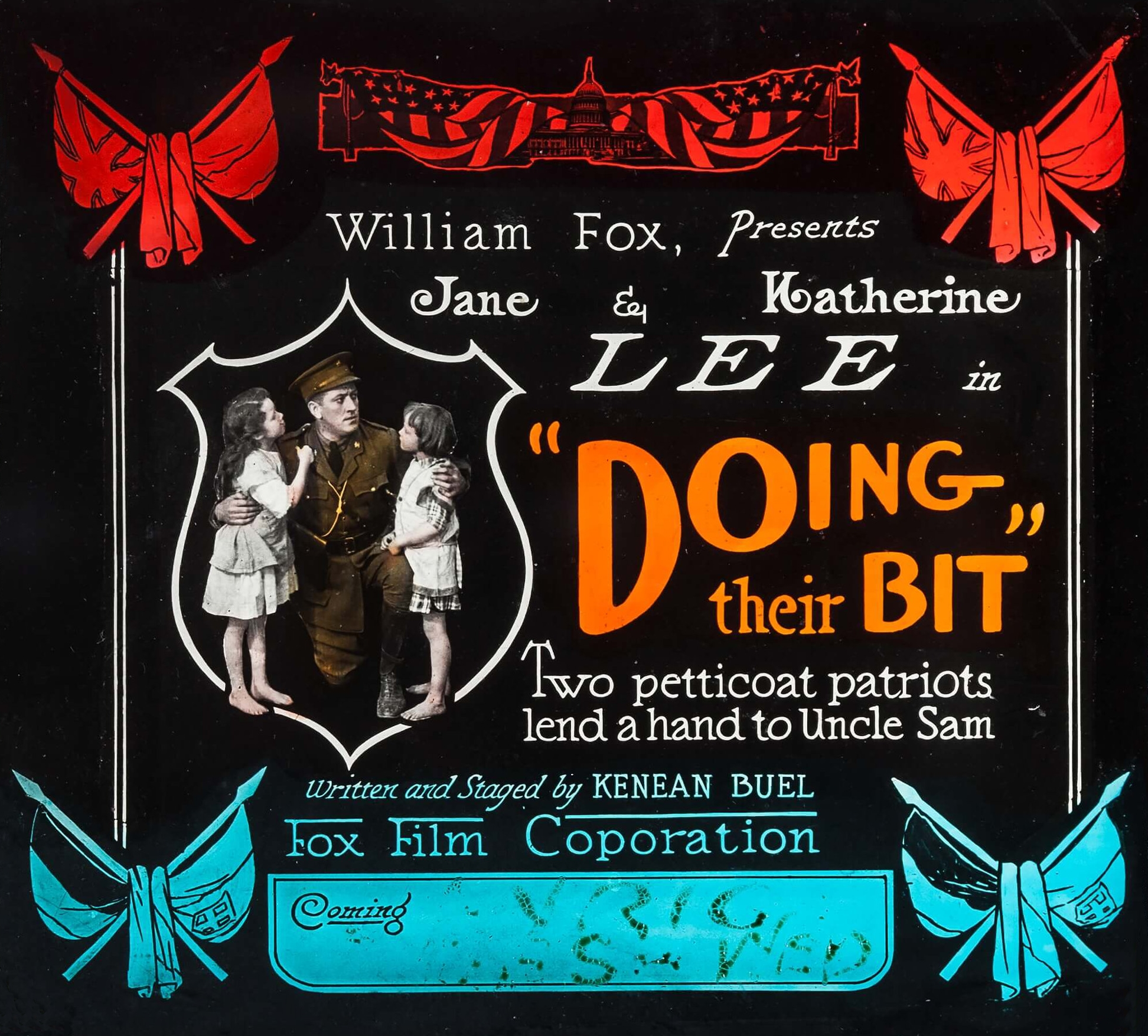
Doing Their Bit (1918) lantern slide

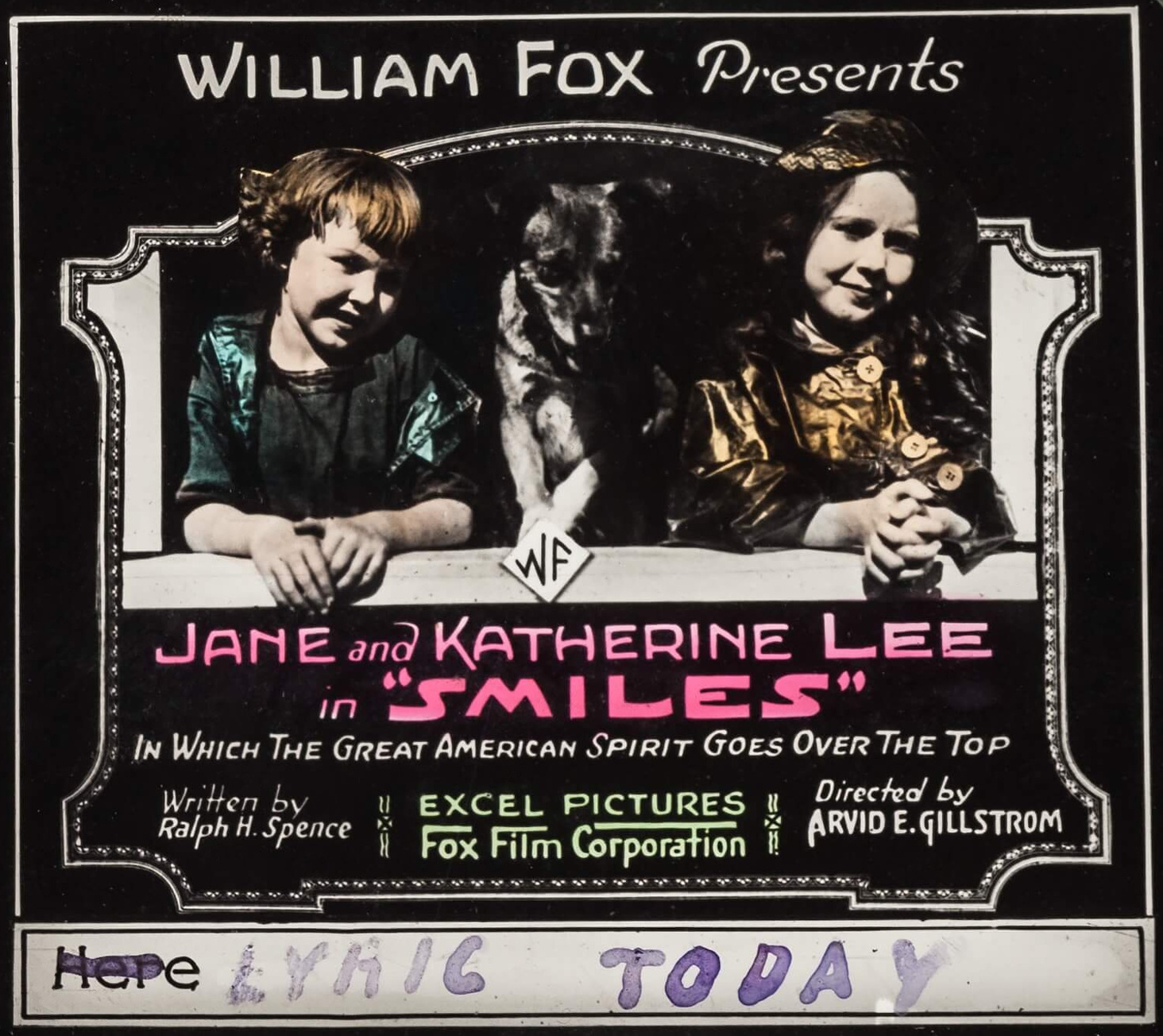
Smiles (1919) lantern silde

== Partial filmography ==
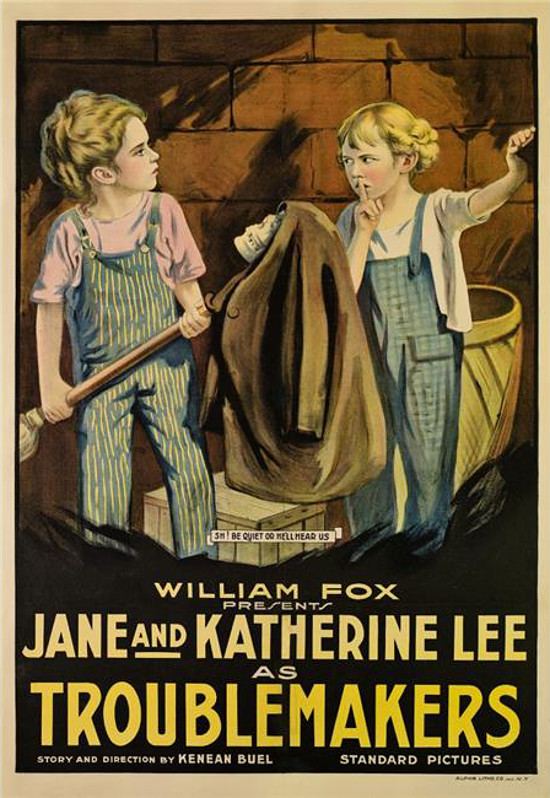
Jane and Katherine starred in Trouble Makers (1917)

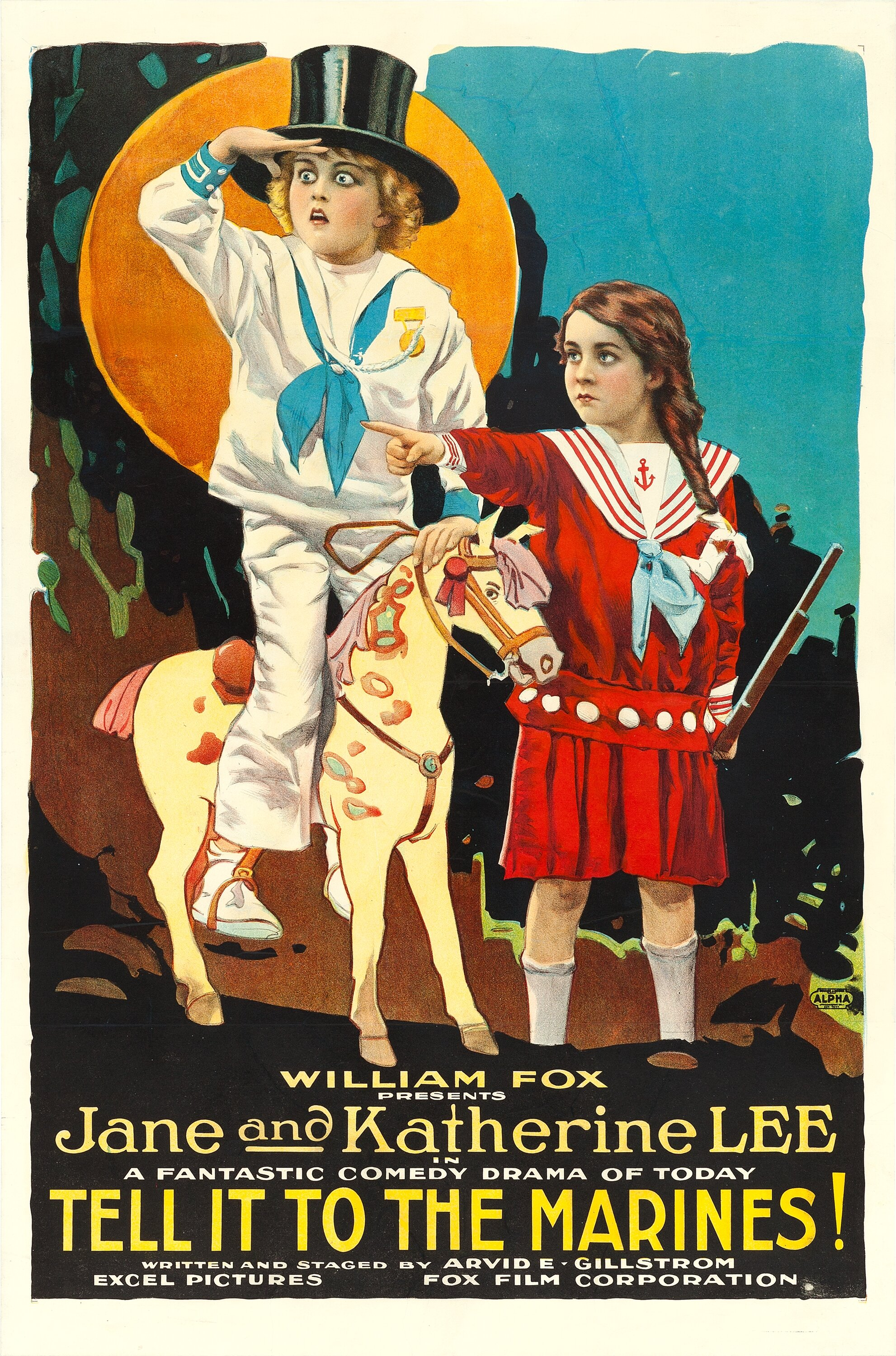
Jane and Katherine in Tell It to the Marines (1918)

Year	Title	Appearance	Notes
1913	The Return of Tony	Katherine	
1914	The Scales of Justice	Katherine	
1914	The Old Rag Doll	Jane and Katherine	
1914	When the Heart Calls	Jane and Katherine	Short
1914	Neptune's Daughter	Jane and Katherine	
1914	His Prior Claim	Jane	Short
1915	A Life in the Balance	Jane and Katherine	
1915	The Studio of Life	Jane and Katherine	
1915	The Clemenceau Case	Jane	
1915	Tony	Jane	
1915	The Devil's Daughter	Jane	
1915	The Magic Toy Maker	Jane and Katherine	
1915	Silver Threads Among the Gold	Jane and Katherine	
1915	The Soul of Broadway	Jane	
1915	The Galley Slave	Jane	
1916	A Daughter of the Gods	Jane and Katherine	
1916	Daredevil Kate	Jane and Katherine	
1916	A Wife's Sacrifice	Jane	
1916	The Ragged Princess	Jane and Katherine	
1916	Romeo and Juliet	Jane and Katherine	
1916	Her Double Life	Jane and Katherine	
1916	Love and Hate	Jane and Katherine	
1917	Trouble Makers	Jane and Katherine	
1917	The Small Town Girl	Jane	
1917	Patsy	Jane	
1917	A Child of the Wild	Jane and Katherine	
1917	Two Little Imps	Jane and Katherine	
1917	Sister Against Sister	Jane	
1918	American Buds	Jane and Katherine	
1918	Dixie Madcaps	Jane and Katherine	
1918	Swat the Spy	Jane and Katherine	
1918	Tell It to the Marines	Jane and Katherine	
1919	Smiles	Jane and Katherine	
1919	Love Us, Love Our Dog	Jane and Katherine	
1922	A Pair of Aces	Jane and Katherine	Short
1924	The Side Show of Life	Katherine	
1936	Vitaphone Billboard	Jane and Katherine	Vaudeville short, as adults
1949	Knock on Any Door	Jane	Uncredited
1950	Cheaper by the Dozen	Jane	Uncredited
1951	Comin' Round the Mountain	Jane	Uncredited

== See also ==
- Madeline and Marion Fairbanks, identical twin actresses in film and theatre
- The Duncan Sisters, American vaudeville duo
