= Florence Ashbrooke =

American actress

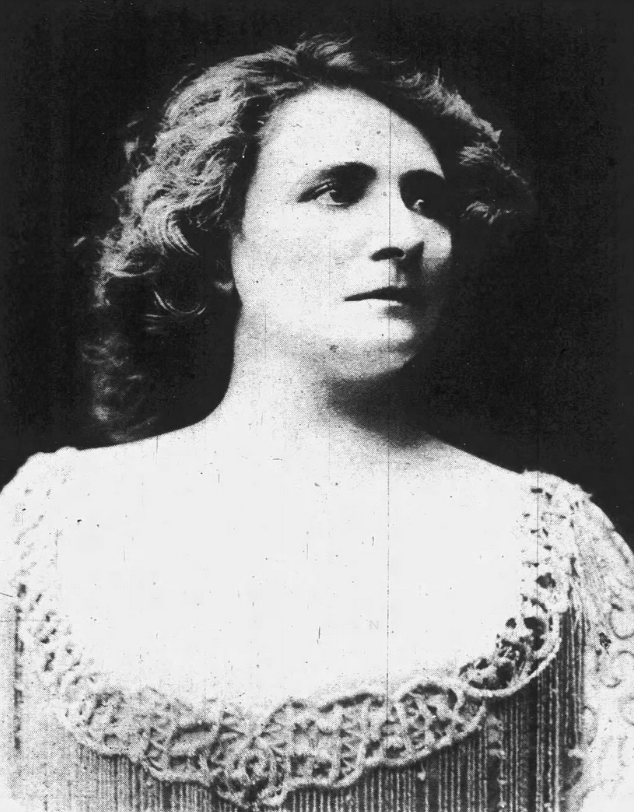
- Florence Ashbrooke, from a 1904 newspaper
- Born: 1860s sources vary, possibly India or England
- Died: February 20, 1934; Los Angeles, California. U.S.
- Other names: Eleanor Skyrock, Eleanor Shyrock, Eleanor Lugannagh
- Occupation: Actress
- Spouse: Tote Du Crow

Florence Ashbrooke (about 1861 – February 20, 1934) was an actress on the London and New York stages, and in silent films.

== Early life and education ==
Ashbrooke was born to British parents in India or the East Indies, or in England, and educated in Dublin.

== Career ==
Ashbrooke began her acting career in England. She was a dancer with the Gaiety Company in London as a young woman. She acted on the New York stage and toured in plays in North America, with credits in The Twelve Temptations (1889), The Ice King (1890), McKenna's Flirtation (1892), Dolly Varden (1893), Blue Grass (1894), When London Sleeps (1896), An Irish Gentleman (1897), A Young Wife (1900), Why Women Sin (1903), Her Mad Marriage (1904), and At the Old Cross Roads (1908). The Omaha Bee described Ashbrooke in 1890, as "a much stronger woman than you usually see in farces" with a "handsome figure, a well modulated voice, and an art which shows a most excellent school."

Ashbrooke appeared in dozens of silent films between 1911 and 1923, including an adaptation of Vanity Fair (1911), The First Woman Jury in America (1912), The Cross Roads (1912), The Forgotten Latchkey (1913), The Ragged Princess (1916), On Dangerous Ground (1917), The Scarlet Letter (1917), The Lone Wolf (1917), Peggy, the Will O' the Wisp (1917), Blue-Eyed Mary (1918), Swat the Spy (1918), The Woman on the Index (1919), An Amateur Widow (1919), A Stage Romance (1922), and Big Brother (1923). She was a member of the Motion Picture section of the Actors' Equity Association in 1921.

== Personal life ==
Ashbrooke described herself as a widow when she married actor and circus clown Tote Du Crow in 1889; they separated in 1904, and divorced in 1909. She died in 1934, in Los Angeles, probably in her seventies.
