= Sister Against Sister =

1917 film by James Vincent

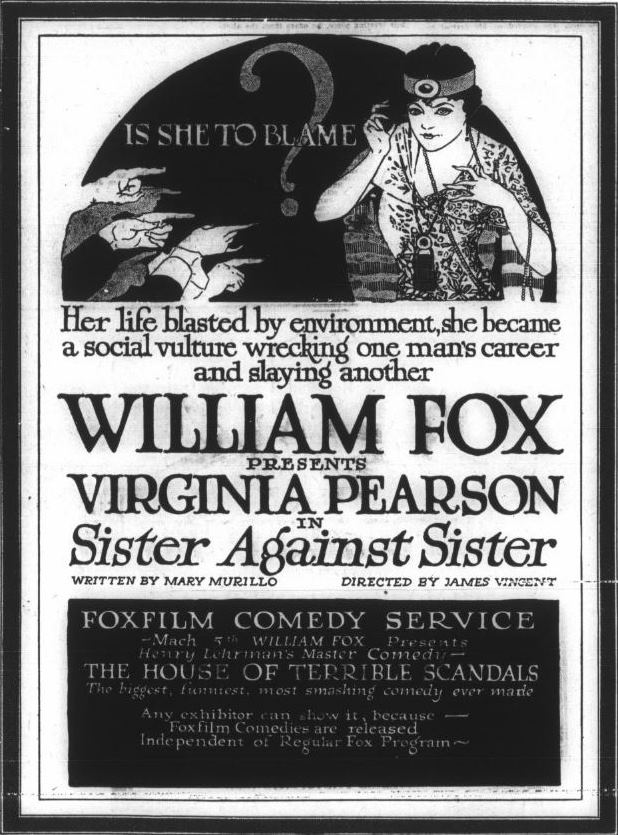
- Directed by: James Vincent
- Written by: Mary Murillo
- Starring: Virginia Pearson; Maud Hall Macy; Walter Law
- Cinematography: René Guissart
- Production company: Fox Film
- Distributed by: Fox Film
- Release date: March 4, 1917
- Running time: 50 minutes
- Country: United States
- Languages: Silent; English intertitles

Sister Against Sister is a 1917 American silent drama film directed by James Vincent and starring Virginia Pearson, Maud Hall Macy and Walter Law.

== Cast ==
- Virginia Pearson as Anne / Katherine
- Maud Hall Macy as Mrs. Martin
- Walter Law as Huxley
- Irving Cummings as Dunsmore
- Calla Dillatore as Mrs. Raymond
- William Battista as Peter Raymond
- Archie Battista as Johnny Raymond
- Jane Lee as Alice Reynolds

== Bibliography ==
- Solomon, Aubrey. The Fox Film Corporation, 1915-1935: A History and Filmography. McFarland, 2011.
