= Two Little Imps =

1917 film by Kenean Buel

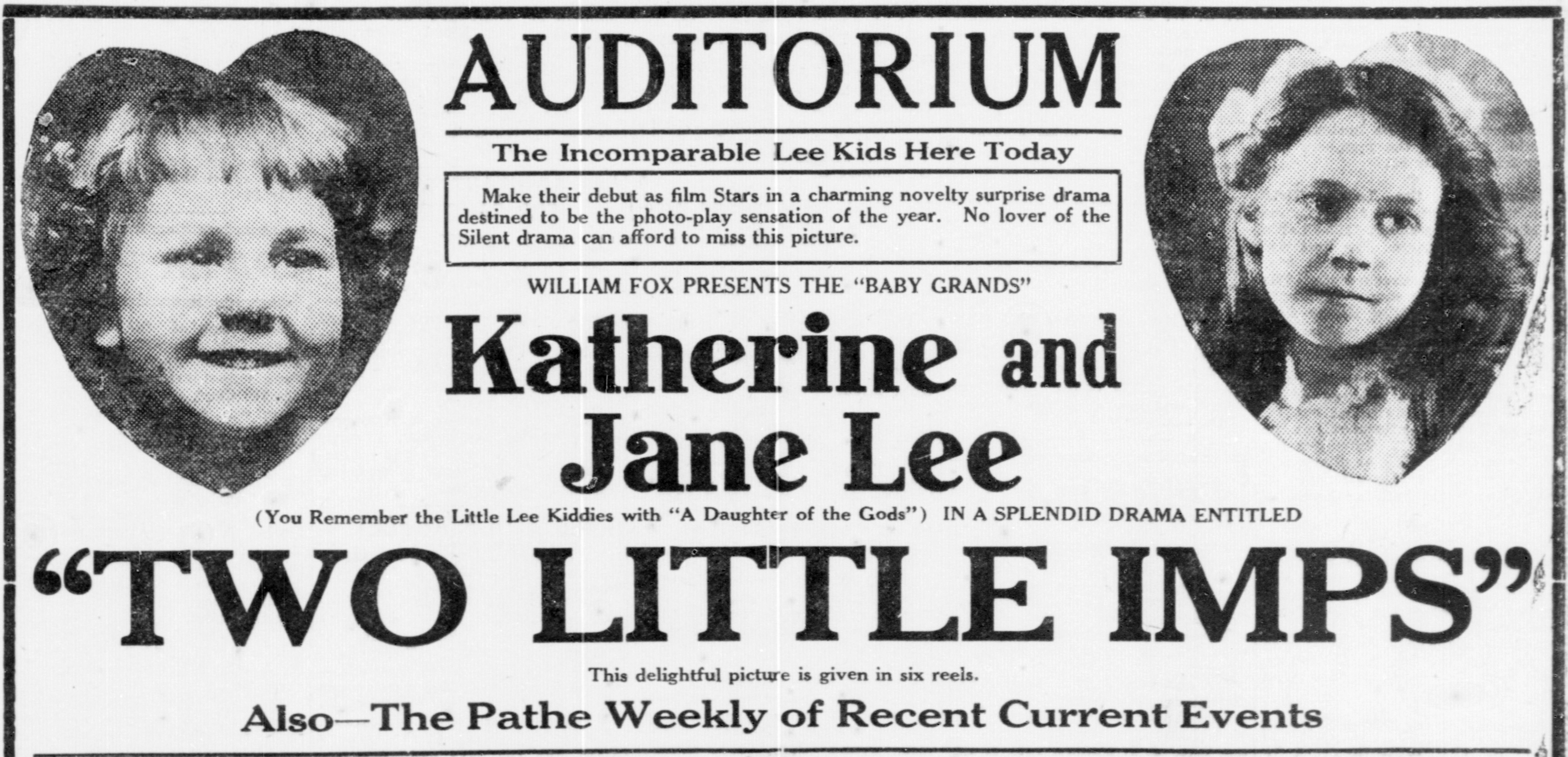
- Newspaper advertisement
- Directed by: Kenean Buel
- Written by: Mary Murillo
- Produced by: William Fox
- Starring: Jane Lee; Katherine Lee; Leslie Austin
- Production company: Fox Film
- Distributed by: Fox Film
- Release date: July 8, 1917
- Running time: 50 minutes
- Country: United States
- Languages: Silent; English intertitles

Two Little Imps is a 1917 American silent comedy film directed by Kenean Buel and starring Jane Lee, Katherine Lee and Leslie Austin.

== Cast ==
- Jane Lee as Jane
- Katherine Lee as Katherine
- Leslie Austin as Billy Parke
- Edna Hunter as Betty Murray
- Edwin Holt as William Murray
- Stuart Sage as Bob Murray
- Sidney D'Albrook as Burglar
- William Harvey as His Pal
