= The Cross-Roads =

1912 film

- Directed by: Frederick A. Thomson
- Produced by: Vitagraph Company of America
- Starring: George Cooper; Zena Keefe
- Distributed by: General Film Company
- Release date: August 7, 1912
- Running time: short; 1 reel
- Country: USA
- Language: Silent..English titles

The Cross-Roads is a 1912 silent short film drama directed by Frederick A. Thomson and produced by the Vitagraph Company of America. It starred George Cooper and Zena Keefe.

It is preserved in the Library of Congress collection.

== Cast ==
- George Cooper - Kirke Dundee
- Zena Keefe - Charity Hale
- Mary Maurice - Phoebe Hale, Charity's Mother
- Charles Eldridge - Abel Hale
- Hal Wilson - Lawyer Salmon
- Florence Ashbrooke - Toby's Mother
- Frank Currier - Kirke's Uncle
