= The Woman Who Lied =

- Still from the film
- Directed by: Lucius Henderson
- Written by: Olga Printzlau
- Starring: Mary Fuller; William Heidoff; Paul Panzer
- Production company: Victor Film Company
- Distributed by: Universal Film Manufacturing Company
- Release date: October 6, 1915
- Running time: 3 reels
- Country: United States
- Language: Silent (English intertitles)

The Woman Who Lied is a 1915 short drama film directed by Lucius Henderson. It was distributed by Universal Pictures.

== Plot ==
The curtain falls as Cleo finishes her remarkable portrayal of a woman dying after having taken poison, and she is enthusiastically applauded. Gordon, the debonair lover of Cleo, leaves his box and goes to her dressing room. He is making love to her when Harry Parker, her husband, enters and reproaches her for her unfaithfulness. The husband, picking up a revolver, is prevented from shooting his wife t>7 Gordon, who struggles with him. The noise attracts the attention of Jack Stanley, who has just answered a telephone call at the back of the stage, and who rushes into the actress' room immediately after Gordon has killed Harry. Taking the pistol from Gordon, Jack asks for an explanation, and is bending over the body as Cleo hides Gordon and as the stage manager and stage hands rush in Jack is accused of the murder and sentenced to fifteen years In prison, and Helen Forde, fiance of the imprisoned man, is convinced from a newspaper story that he must have had an association with the actress.

Despite the fact that Gordon is in love with Cleo, he tries to get Helen to marry him. Cleo also urges the marriage, as Gordon has promised to spend a good part of Helen's wealth on her. Finally, Helen consents, and they are married. Three years have passed, and Gordon tires of Cleo. Helen is brutally treated by hei husband, and she realizes that she has made a mistake in marrying him. Cleo, to get revenge on Gordon, informs Helen that it was not Jack who had committed the murder, but Gordon. Through the pleadings of Beatty, the little daughter of Helen, as to the reason why her mother is crying, Cleo, who has been touched by the child's pathetic appeal, becomes deeply attached to the mother, and the two women plan to right the wrong.

Helen, determining that she will not live with a murderer any longer, leaves with Cleo for the West, and everything goes along smoothly until their funds run low. Cleo, unknown to Helen, obtains a position as a dancer in a cafe in order to raise a little money to maintain their home. Here she meets Jack, who had escaped from prison. After the performance. Cleo takes him to Helen's cottage, where a happy reconciliation is effected between the estranged couple.

Meanwhile, Gordon, who has returned from his business trip, during which time Helen left him, finds the note his wife wrote him before she left. Learning of the whereabouts of Helen with the aid of detectives, he goes to the town in which they live, and accidentally sees Jack. Gordon spreads the news that Jack is a jail bird, and a posse is formed and sent in search of him. Gordon calls upon Helen and encounters Jack, who, inflamed at the malicious work of Gordon, springs upon the culprit just as Cleo spies the posse surrounding the house. Holding a pistol at Gordon, she tells him to stand while Jack seeks refuge in a secret cellar entered through a trap door under the carpet. After abstracting a full written confession from Gordon she permits him to escape. As he Is making a getaway, the posse spy him and, taking him for Jock, he is shot. The posse discover their mistake and bring the dead man back to the cottage, but the situation Is cleared by the written confession which Cleo produces.

== Cast ==
- Mary Fuller as Cleo Martell
- William Heidoff as Harry Parker
- Paul Panzer as Gordon Trent
- Edna Hunter as Helen Forde
- Milton Sills as Jack Stanley
- Charles Ogle as Sheriff Cassidy

== Reception ==
In a contemporary review for Motion Picture News, Peter Milne referred to fuller's performance as both alluring and pitiable.
