= The Voice in the Night (film) =

The Voice in the Night is an American silent drama film directed by Clay M. Greene. Made by the Lubin Manufacturing Company, it used a story written by Anthony Paul Kelly. The film starred the director's daughter, Helen Greene, as The Mystery Woman, and actor Arthur Matthews as Richard Powell. Others in the cast included Leslie Austin as the minister Mr. Wayne, Francis Joyner as Joseph Leach, James Cassady as Sergeant Lewis, and Hollins Antrim as Governor Spaulding. Three reels in length, the film was released on March 30, 1916.

== Plot ==
A newspaper reporter, Richard Powell, observes a mystery woman surreptitiously meeting with a man in a park. They are interrupted by a masked man who assaults and kills the other man meeting with the woman. The mystery woman flees before the reporter arrives, but he manages to come upon the masked man who claims he did a good deed before himself running off. The police arrive, but the reporter conceals what he observed about the murder in hopes he solve the crime himself and get a "scoop" for his paper.

Powell works to uncover the identities of the mystery woman, the masked man, and the murdered victim. He ultimately discovers that the mystery woman is the wife of the state's governor, Governor Spaulding, and that the victim was her first husband, Joseph Leach, who was blackmailing her. The masked man was her brother, a minister. In the end, its revealed that the death was an accident, as the gun used in the crime was the blackmailers, and in the struggle the gun went off with the blackmailer accidentally shooting himself.

== Reception ==
Critic Genevieve Harris gave a positive review of the film in Motography praising the acting and photography. She stated that "The story fulfills very well its first mission, to interest. It is clear and plausible, and is dramatically presented."
