= William H. Tooker =

American actor

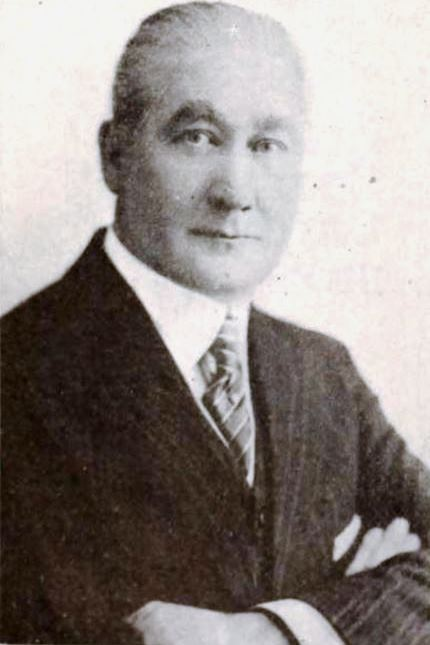
- Exhibitors Herald, 1920
- Born: September 2, 1869; New York City, U.S.
- Died: October 10, 1936 (aged 67); Hollywood, California, U.S.
- Other name: William Tucker
- Occupation: actor
- Years active: 1912-1935

William H. Tooker (September 2, 1869 – October 10, 1936) was an American stage and film actor.

Tooker acted with the Tivoli Comic Opera Company in San Francisco. On Broadway, he performed in The Coronet of the Duchess (1904) and The Governor's Lady (1912). His film debut was in The Stealers.

In addition to acting, Tooker was a chemist who invented polish for tan shoes.

He was born in New York and died in Hollywood California.

== Selected filmography ==
- How Molly Made Good (1915)
- The Curious Conduct of Judge Legarde (1915)
- Sunday (1915)
- A Modern Magdalen (1915) as Joe Mercer
- A Fool's Revenge (1916)
- A Modern Thelma (1916)
- East Lynne (1916)
- Ambition (1916)
- Red, White and Blue Blood (1917)
- The Bitter Truth (1917)
- The Light in Darkness (1917)
- Men (1918)
- The Woman the Germans Shot (1918)
- The Lost Battalion (1919)
- Greater Than Fame (1920)
- Heliotrope (1920)
- The Vice of Fools (1920)
- The Greatest Love (1920)
- Proxies (1921)
- The Power Within (1921)
- Worlds Apart (1921)
- God's Country and the Law (1921)
- Peacock Alley (1922)
- Beyond the Rainbow (1922)
- The Cradle Buster (1922)
- My Friend the Devil (1922)
- Sinner or Saint (1923)
- The Purple Highway (1923)
- Wife in Name Only (1923)
- The Average Woman (1924)
- Who's Cheating? (1924)
- The Lone Wolf (1924)
- The Phantom Express (1925)
- The Devil's Circus (1926) *uncredited
- The Scarlet Letter (1926)
- The White Black Sheep (1926)
- The Merry Cavalier (1926)
- Birds of Prey (1927)
- Two Girls Wanted (1927)
- Tell It to Sweeney (1927)
- Jake the Plumber (1927)
- The Devil Dancer (1927)
- A Woman Against the World (1928)
- Virgin Lips (1928)
- Sweet Sixteen (1928)
- Night Watch (1928)
- Romance of the Underworld (1928)
- The Bellamy Trial (1929)
- No Defense (1929)
