= A Prince of a King =

1923 film

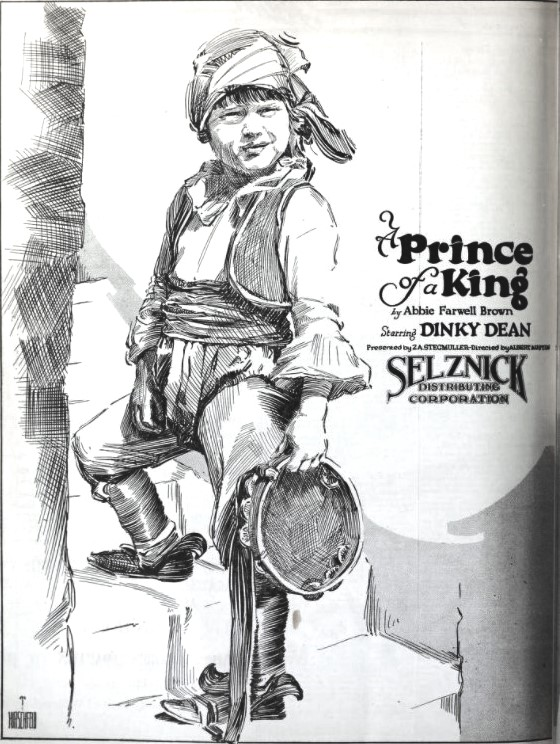
- Directed by: Albert Austin
- Written by: Douglas Z. Doty
- Based on: John of the Woods by Alice Farwell Brown
- Starring: Dean Riesner; Virginia Pearson; Eric Mayne
- Cinematography: Harris Thorpe
- Edited by: Doane Harrison
- Production company: Z.A. Stegmuller Productions
- Distributed by: Selznick Pictures
- Release date: October 13, 1923
- Running time: 60 minutes
- Country: United States
- Languages: Silent; English intertitles

A Prince of a King is a 1923 American silent historical adventure film directed by Albert Austin and starring Dean Riesner, Virginia Pearson and Eric Mayne.

== Synopsis ==
In a kingdom in fifteenth century Italy, Duke Roberto overthrows the king and abandons his heir Gigi in the wilderness to die. However he is discovered by a troupe of Gypsy acrobats and emerges as their star performer. Back in the capital he is recognised by the former king's physician leading to the downfall of Roberto.

== Cast ==
- Dean Riesner as Gigi, the Prince
- Virginia Pearson as Queen Claudia
- Eric Mayne as King Lorenzo
- John St. Polis as Mario
- Josef Swickard as Urbano
- Mitchell Lewis as Andrea, the giant
- Sam De Grasse as Duke Roberto

== Bibliography ==
- Connelly, Robert B. The Silents: Silent Feature Films, 1910-36, Volume 40, Issue 2. December Press, 1998.
- Munden, Kenneth White. The American Film Institute Catalog of Motion Pictures Produced in the United States, Part 1. University of California Press, 1997.
