= Richard Jose =

Cornish-American countertenor (1862–1941)

Richard José
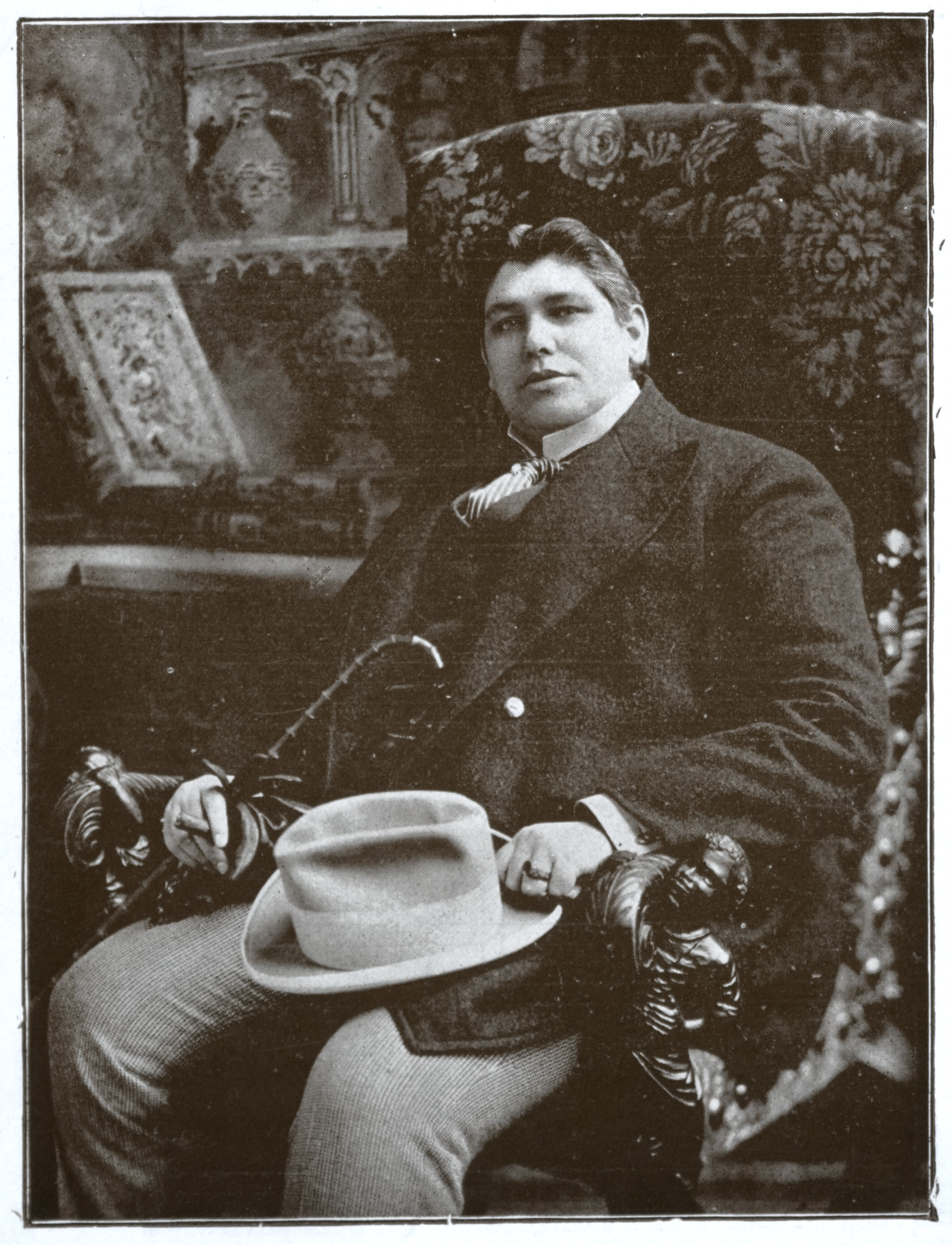

Background information
- Born: June 5, 1862
- Died: October 20, 1941 (aged 79)
- Occupation: Singer

Richard J. José (June 5, 1862 – October 20, 1941) was an English-born American countertenor (contextually a very high tenor), popular during the early 20th century.

== Life ==
Richard Jose was born in Lanner, Cornwall in England in 1862. Following the death of his father in 1876, he emigrated to Nevada in search of his uncle. He sang in saloons for charity, and in 1881 with Thatcher's Minstrels. In 1884, he joined a minstrel troupe in California, and later appeared in New York City. In 1896, Jose married Therese Shreve.

In 1887, he won a gold medal from the Academy of Music (New York City). He made cylinder recordss as early as 1892 for the New England Phonograph Company, a sub-company of the North American Phonograph Company based in New England. From 1902 to 1906, he recorded for the Victor Talking Machine Company, and his version of "Silver Threads Among the Gold" was a best-seller. In 1905 and 1906, he toured with his own minstrel show, and in 1906, was injured when a stage curtain fell on him.

In 1915, Jose was seen performing "Silver Threads Among the Gold" in a short silent movie of the same name, by Pierce Kingsley and R. R. Roberts. After retiring from entertainment, Jose became the Deputy Real Estate Commissioner for the state of California.

== Pronunciation ==
Jose, pronounced /z/ like "rose," is a Cornish name. He added an accent, eɪ as in José.

== Discography ==
- "Belle Brandon" (02:47) Victor 2554, 1903-10-27
- "Dear old songs" (02:24) Victor 2629, 1904-01-12
- "Dear old songs" (03:37) Victor 31170, 1904-01-14
- "May, sweet May" (01:23) Victor 2630, 1904-01-12
- "May, sweet May" (01:57) Victor 2630, 1904-01-12
- "Abide with me" (02:09) Victor 2633, 1904-01-14
- "Glory to God" (03:38) Victor 31192, 1904-01-18
- "Sun of my soul" (02:42) Victor 2669, 1904-01-18
- "O come all ye faithful" (02:12) Victor 2725, 1904-01-20
- "Since Nellie went away" (04:00) Victor 31489, 1905-12-22
- "When I'm away from you, dear" (03:19) Victor 31154, 1904-12-08
- "She fought on by his side" (02:05) Victor 4261, 1904-12-09
- "Too late!" (03:51) Victor 31344, 1904-12-08
- "Killarney" (03:16) Victor 31343, 1904-12-09
- "Dear old girl" (04:15) Victor 31172, 1904-12-10
- "With all her faults I love her still" (04:10) Victor 31171, 1904-12-10
- "Rose of my life" (02:27) Victor 4219, 1904-12-10
- "Time and tide" (03:48) Victor 31355, 1904-12-09
- "Home, sweet home" (03:27) Victor 31515,
- "Belle Brandon" (03:03) Victor 16666
- "When You and I Were Young, Maggie" (03:59) Victor 31485, 1905-12-20
- "I cannot sing the old songs" (03:59) Victor 31496, 1905-12-21
- "Ben Bolt" (03:29) Victor 31497, 1905-12-22
- "The blind boy (03:26) Victor 31513, 1906-02-23
- "We've been chums for fifty years" (03:58) Victor 31516, 1906-02-23
- "Home, sweet home" (03:24) Victor 31515, 1906-02-23
- "The ninety and nine" (03:01) Victor 4755, 1906-02-23
- "Abide with me" (02:19) Victor 16660, 1906-02-23
- "Softly now the light of day" (02:32) Victor 2686, 1906-02-23

== Sources ==
- Tim Gracyk; Frank W. Hoffmann (2000). Popular American recording pioneers, 1895-1925. Psychology Press. ISBN 978-1-56024-993-1.
