= The Heart of a Lion =

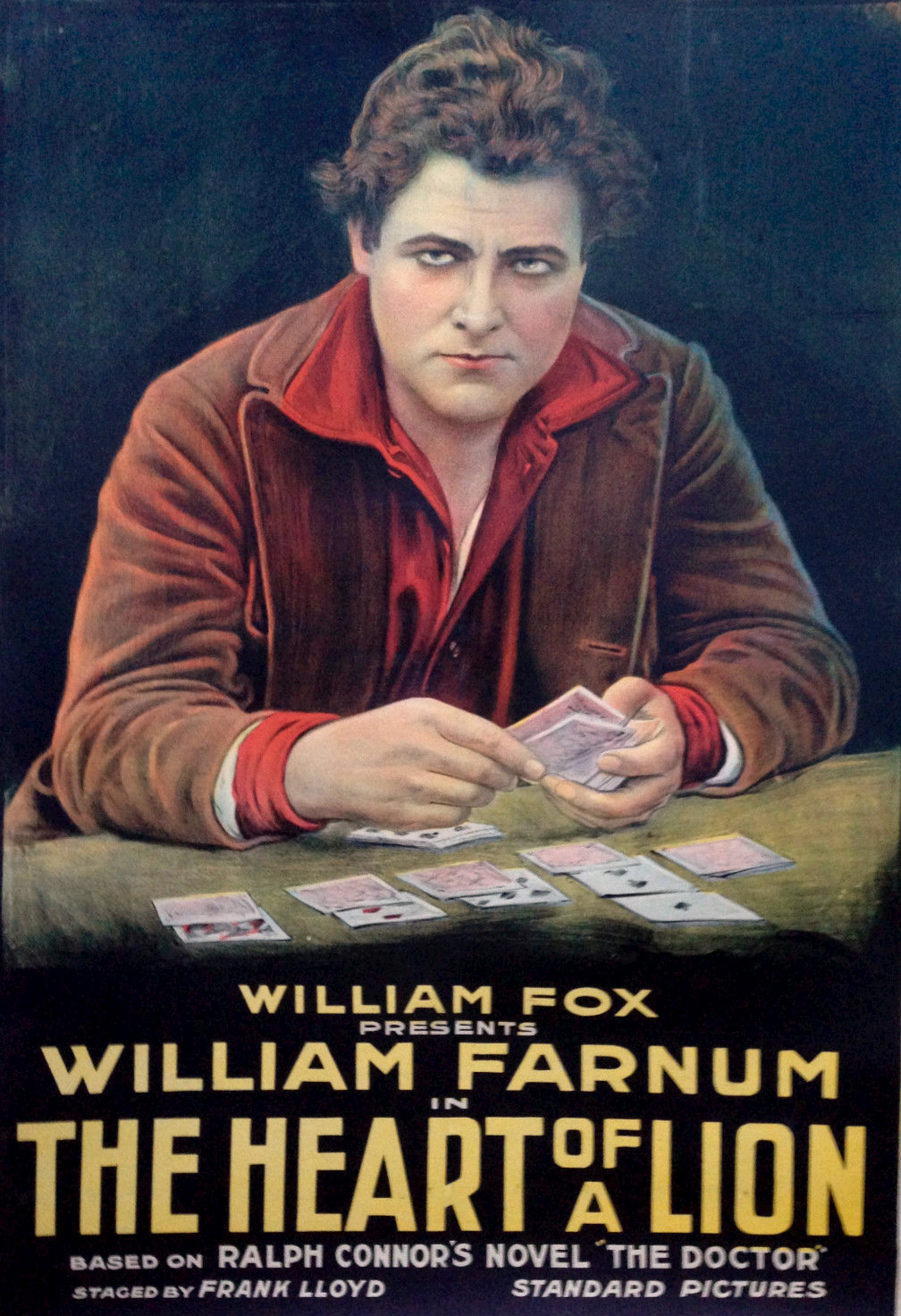
- Film poster
- Directed by: Frank Lloyd
- Written by: Frank Lloyd
- Based on: novel The Doctor: A Tale of the Rockies by Charles William Gordon as Ralph Connor
- Produced by: William Fox
- Starring: William Farnum
- Cinematography: Billy Foster
- Distributed by: Fox Film Corporation
- Release date: December 15, 1917
- Running time: 70 minutes; 7 reels
- Country: USA
- Language: Silent..English titles

The Heart of a Lion is a lost 1917 silent film drama directed by Frank Lloyd and starring William Farnum. Fox Film Corporation produced and distributed the movie. It is based on a novel by Ralph Connor.

== Cast ==
- William Farnum – Barney Kemper
- Mary Martin – Margaret Danforth
- William Courtleigh Jr. – Dick Kemper
- Wanda Hawley – Iola Hamilton (*as Wanda Petit)
- Walter Law – Tex
- Marc Robbins – Hiram Danforth M.D.
- Rita Bori – Dolly

== See also ==
- 1937 Fox vault fire
