= Blazing Love =

1916 film by Kenean Buel

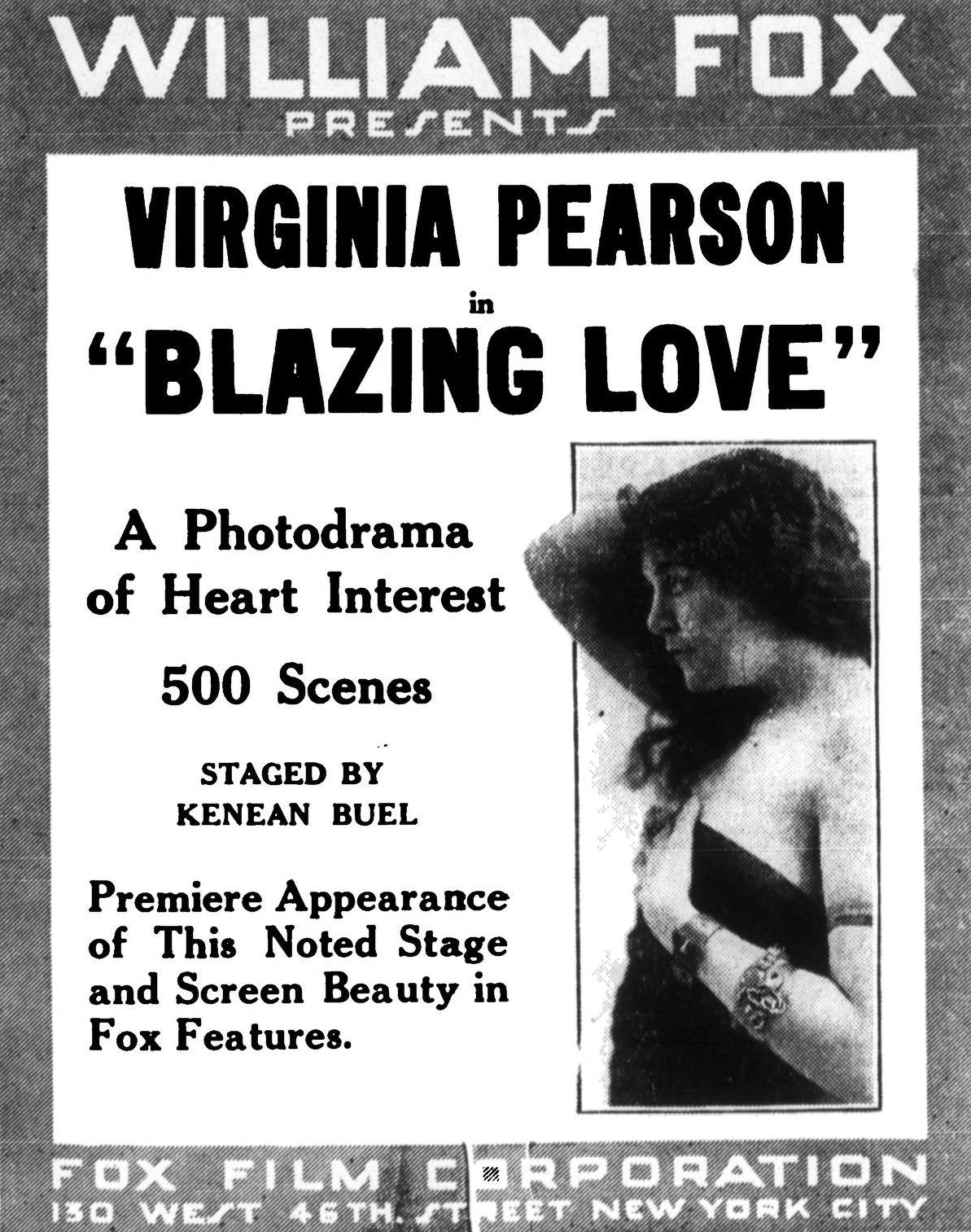
- Directed by: Kenean Buel
- Written by: Mary Murillo
- Starring: Virginia Pearson; Louise Huff
- Cinematography: Phil Rosen
- Production company: Fox Film
- Distributed by: Fox Film
- Release date: April 30, 1916
- Country: United States
- Languages: Silent; English intertitles

Blazing Love is a 1916 American silent drama film directed by Kenean Buel and starring Virginia Pearson and Louise Huff.

== Cast ==
- Virginia Pearson as Margaret Walsh
- Louise Huff as Jeanne Clark
- Frank Burbeck as Morgan Delafield
- Mattie Ferguson as Mammy
- Frank Goldsmith as Russell Barridan
- John Merkyl as Stephen Bond
- George Selby as Arthur Graham
- Louis Stern as Charles Walsh

== Bibliography ==
- Solomon, Aubrey. The Fox Film Corporation, 1915-1935: A History and Filmography. McFarland, 2011.
