= The Great Alone (film) =

1922 film

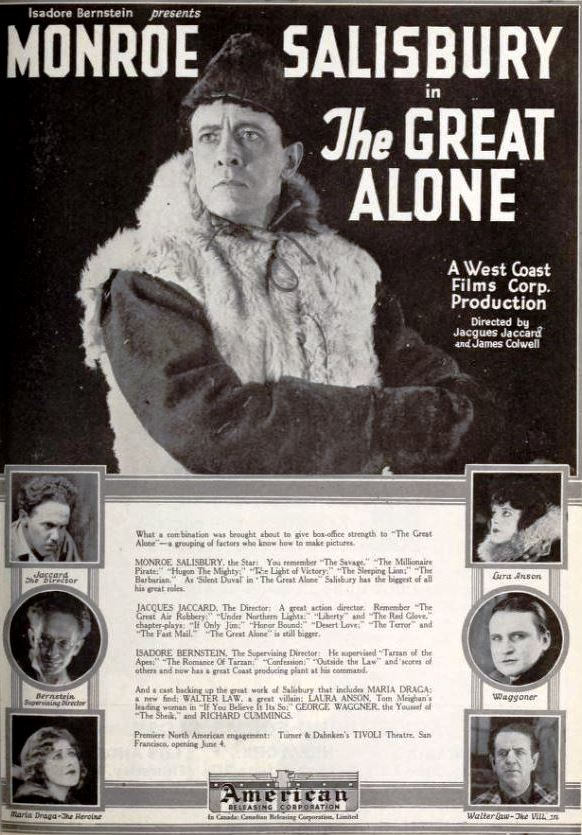
- Directed by: Jacques Jaccard
- Written by: Jacques Jaccard
- Produced by: Isadore Bernstein
- Starring: Monroe Salisbury; Walter Law; George Waggner
- Cinematography: Frank B. Good
- Production company: West Coast Films
- Distributed by: American Releasing Corporation
- Release date: May 21, 1922
- Running time: 60 minutes
- Country: United States
- Languages: Silent; English intertitles

The Great Alone is a 1922 American silent northern drama film directed by Jacques Jaccard and starring Monroe Salisbury, Walter Law and George Waggner.

== Cast ==
- Monroe Salisbury as Silent Duval
- Laura Anson as Nadine Picard
- Walter Law as Winston Sassoon
- Maria Draga as Mary MacDonald
- George Waggner as Bradley Carstairs
- Richard Cummings as MacDonald

== Bibliography ==
- Connelly, Robert B. The Silents: Silent Feature Films, 1910-36, Volume 40, Issue 2. December Press, 1998.
- Munden, Kenneth White. The American Film Institute Catalog of Motion Pictures Produced in the United States, Part 1. University of California Press, 1997.
