= Swat the Spy =

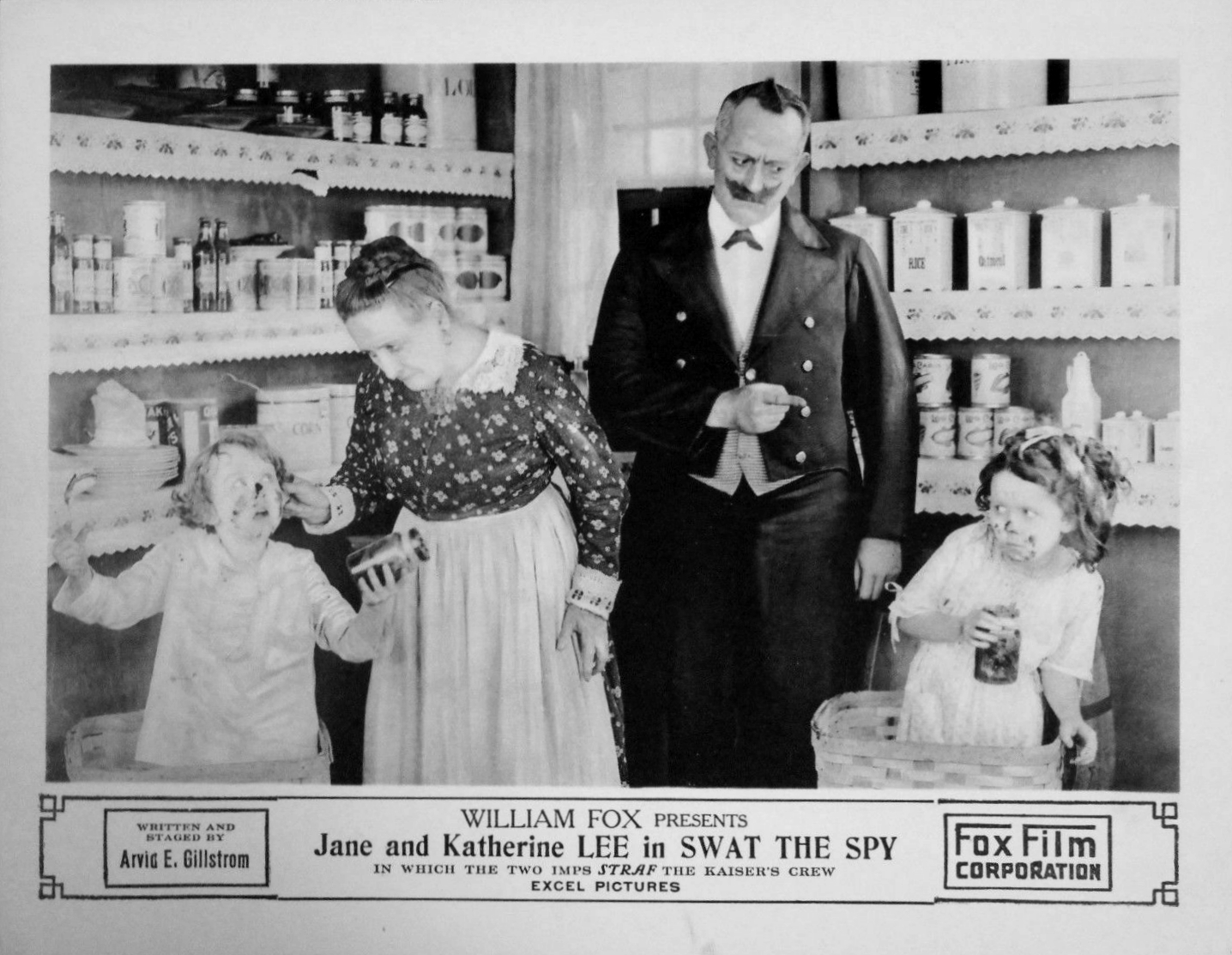
- Lobby card
- Directed by: Arvid E. Gillstrom
- Written by: Raymond L. Schrock (scenario)
- Story by: Hamilton Thompson; Arvid E. Gillstrom
- Starring: Jane Lee; Katherine Lee; Charles Slattery; Pat Hartigan; Florence Ashbrooke
- Cinematography: H. Alderson Leach
- Production company: Fox Film Corporation
- Distributed by: Fox Film Corporation
- Release date: September 29, 1918
- Running time: 5 reels
- Country: United States
- Languages: Silent film (English intertitles)

Swat the Spy is a 1918 American silent comedy-drama film directed by Arvid E. Gillstrom and starring Jane Lee, Katherine Lee, Charles Slattery, Pat Hartigan, and Florence Ashbrooke. The film was released by Fox Film Corporation on September 29, 1918.

== Cast ==
- Jane Lee as Jane Sheldon
- Katherine Lee as Katherine Sheldon
- Charles Slattery as Andrew Sheldon
- Pat Hartigan as Karl Schmidt (as P.C. Hartigan)
- Florence Ashbrooke as Lena Muller

== Preservation ==
Incomplete prints survived at the Library of Congress and Academy Film Archive.
