= Rae Berger =

American actor & director (1877–1931)

- Born: March 26, 1877; Ohio, United States
- Died: November 9, 1931 (aged 54); Ohio, United States
- Other name: Rhea Berger
- Occupations: Film actor, director
- Years active: 1915–1918
- Spouse: Mary Martin

Rae Berger or Rhea Berger (March 26, 1877 – November 9, 1931) was an early silent film actor and director. He is erroneously listed in Duke University's "Women Film Pioneers"; he was in fact male. He married actress Mary Martin.

== Director filmography ==
- Danger Within (1918)
- The Magic Eye (1918)
- The Valley of Decision (1916)
- Bluff (1916)
- The Voice of Love (1916)
- The Three Pals (1916)
- A Million for Mary (1916)
- Purity (1916)
- The Overcoat (1916) (as Rhea Berger)

== Actor filmography ==
- The Craving (1916) as Leroy Calhoun
- The First Quarrel (1916)
- Author! Author! (1915) as Marcellus M. Peckinpaw
- Two Hearts and a Thief (1915)
- Johnny the Barber (1915)
- An Auto-Bungalow Fracas (1915)
- Mother's Busy Week (1915)
- Love, Mumps and Bumps (1915)
- Incognito (1915)
