= Tell It to the Marines (1918 film) =

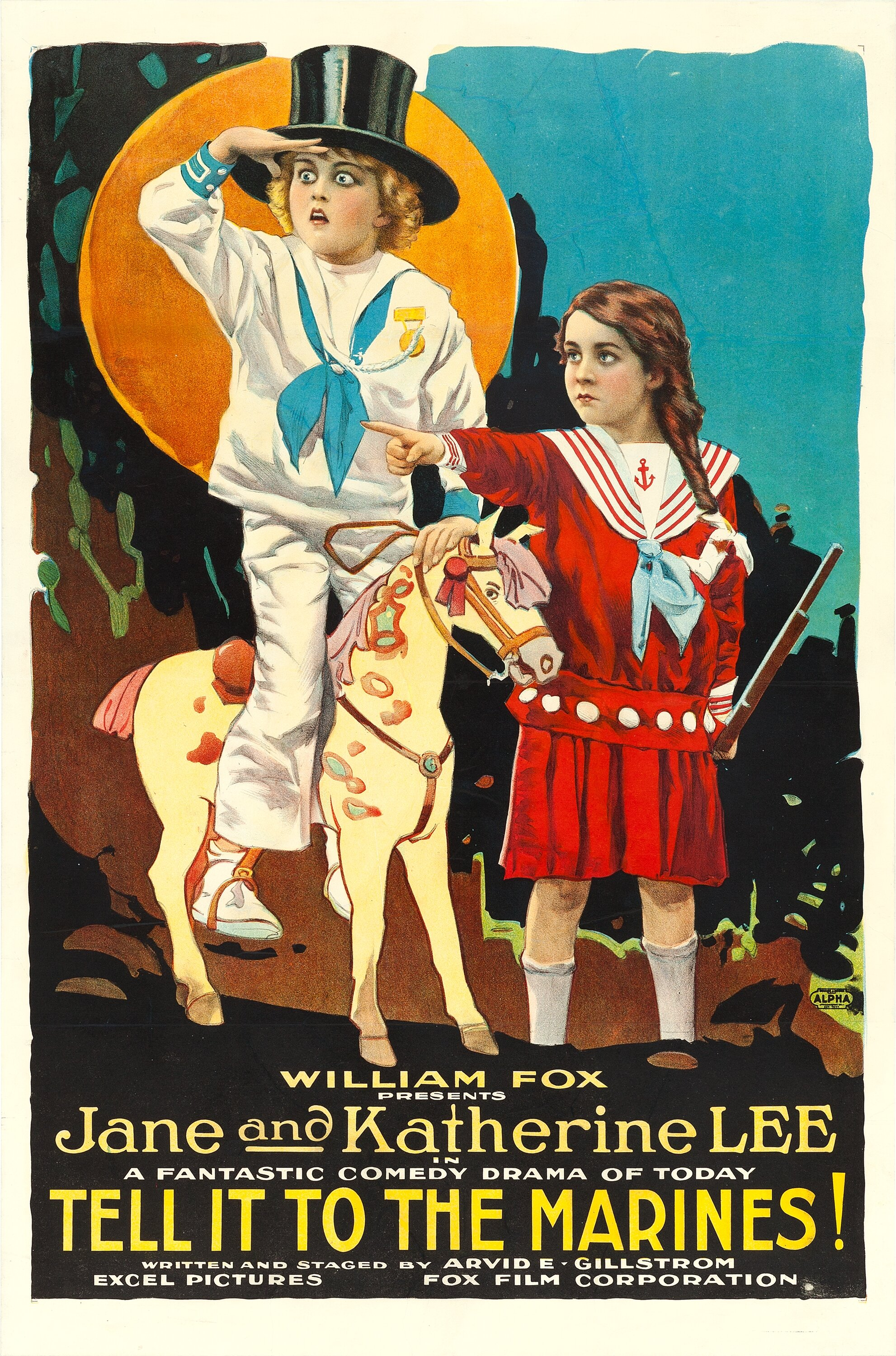
- Poster
- Directed by: Arvid E. Gillstrom
- Written by: Arvid E. Gillstrom; Adrian Johnson
- Starring: Jane Lee; Katherine Lee; Charles Slattery; Edward Bagley
- Cinematography: H. Alderson Leach
- Production company: Fox Film Corporation
- Distributed by: Fox Film Corporation
- Release date: October 13, 1918
- Running time: 5 reels
- Country: United States
- Languages: Silent film (English intertitles)

Tell It to the Marines is a 1918 American silent comedy-drama film directed by Arvid E. Gillstrom and starring Jane and Katherine Lee, Charles Slattery, and Edward Bagley. The film was released by Fox Film Corporation on October 13, 1918.

== Cast ==
- Jane Lee as Jane Williams
- Katherine Lee as Katherine Williams
- Charles Slattery as Harry Williams
- Edward Bagley as the Butler

== Preservation ==
The film is now considered lost.
