= The Light in Darkness =

1917 film

- Directed by: Alan Crosland
- Written by: Alan Crosland; Peter B. Kyne
- Starring: Shirley Mason; Frank Morgan; William H. Tooker
- Production company: Edison Studios
- Distributed by: K-E-S-E Service
- Release date: July 9, 1917
- Country: United States
- Languages: Silent; English intertitles

The Light in Darkness is a 1917 American silent drama film directed by Alan Crosland and starring Shirley Mason, Frank Morgan and William H. Tooker.

== Cast ==
- Shirley Mason as Hilary Kenyon
- Frank Morgan as Ramsey Latham
- William H. Tooker as Sheriff Brad Milligan
- J. Frank Glendon as J. Arthur Converse
- George S. Trimble as Governor of California
- Bigelow Cooper as DeWitt Pierce
- William Wadsworth as Sheriff Len Moody
- Samuel N. Niblack as State Bank Examiner
- Charles Martin as The Bank Teller

== Bibliography ==
- Goble, Alan. The Complete Index to Literary Sources in Film. Walter de Gruyter, 1999.
