= Smiles (film) =

1919 film by Arvid E. Gillstrom

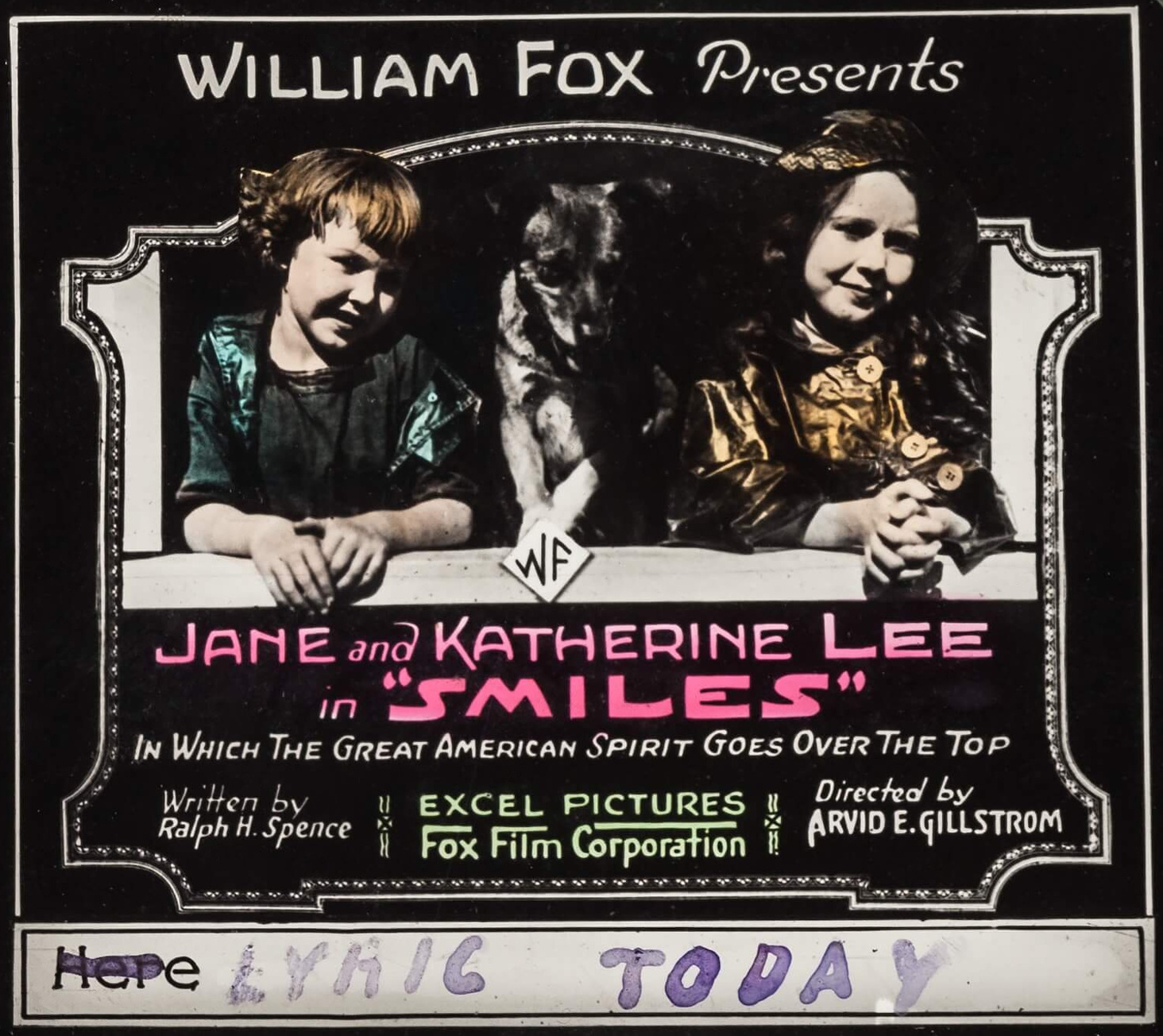
- Lantern slide
- Directed by: Arvid E. Gillstrom
- Written by: Arvid E. Gillstrom (scenario); Albert Glassmire (scenario)
- Story by: Ralph Spence
- Starring: Jane Lee; Katherine Lee; Ethel Fleming; Val Paul; Carmen Phillips
- Cinematography: Frank B. Good
- Production company: Fox Film Corporation
- Distributed by: Fox Film Corporation
- Release date: February 23, 1919
- Running time: 5 reels
- Country: United States
- Languages: Silent film (English intertitles)

Smiles is a 1919 American silent war comedy film directed by Arvid E. Gillstrom and starring Jane Lee, Katherine Lee, Ethel Fleming, Val Paul, and Carmen Phillips. The film was released by Fox Film Corporation on February 23, 1919.

== Cast ==
- Jane Lee as Jane
- Katherine Lee as Katherine
- Ethel Fleming as Lucille Forrest
- Val Paul as Tom Hayes
- Carmen Phillips as Madame Yelba
- Charles Arling as Wagner
- Katherine Griffith as Housekeeper
- Barbara Maier as Little Girl

== Preservation ==
The film is now considered lost.

== See also ==
- List of lost films
- 1937 Fox vault fire
