= The Craving (1916 film) =

1916 film by Charles Bartlett

- Directed by: Charles Bartlett
- Starring: William Russell; Charlotte Burton; Rae Berger
- Distributed by: Mutual Film
- Release date: February 26, 1916
- Running time: 5 reels
- Country: United States
- Languages: Silent film English intertitles

The Craving is a 1916 American silent drama film directed by Charles Bartlett starring William Russell, Charlotte Burton, and Rae Berger.

== Cast ==
- William Russell as Foster Calhoun
- Rae Berger as Leroy Calhoun
- Charlotte Burton as Roby
- Helene Rosson as Margaret Cummings
- Roy Stewart as Oliver Bailey
- Robert Miller as Crooky
