= A Royal Romance (1917 film) =

A Royal Romance (aka:Royal Romance)
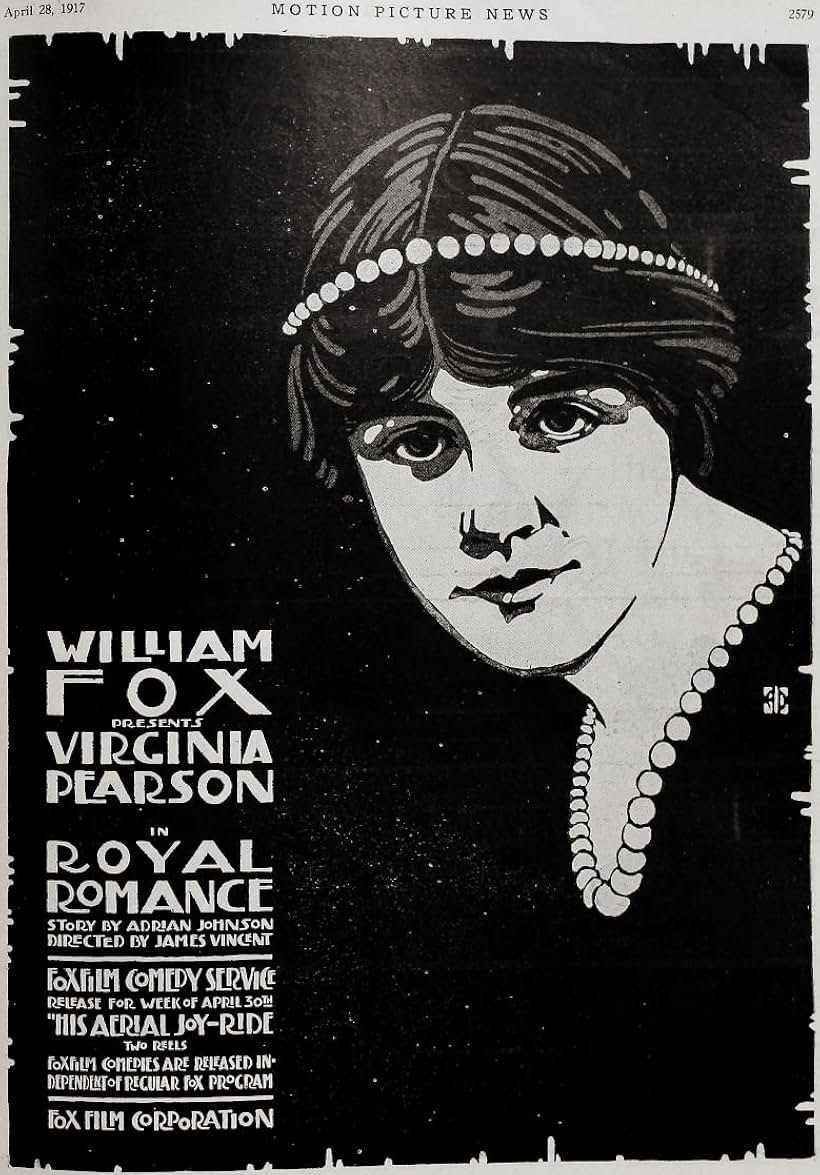
- Directed by: James Vincent
- Written by: Adrian Johnson
- Produced by: William Fox
- Starring: Virginia Pearson; Irving Cummings
- Cinematography: Loren Taylor
- Distributed by: Fox Film Corporation
- Release date: April 30, 1917
- Running time: 5 reels
- Country: USA

A Royal Romance or [Royal Romance] is a lost 1917 silent film comedy drama directed by James Vincent and starring Virginia Pearson and Irving Cummings. It was produced and distributed by the Fox Film Company.

== Cast ==
- Virginia Pearson – The Princess Sylvia
- Royce Coombs – Her Brother
- Irving Cummings – Emperor Maximilian
- Charles Craig – Lord Fitzroy
- Nora Cecil – Miss McPherson
- Grace Henderson – Duchess Marcia
- Nettie Slattery – Baroness Maxine
- Alex Shannon – Prime Minister (*Alex K. Shannon)
- Emil De Varney – Marco Romero

== See also ==
- 1937 Fox vault fire
