= A Child of the Wild =

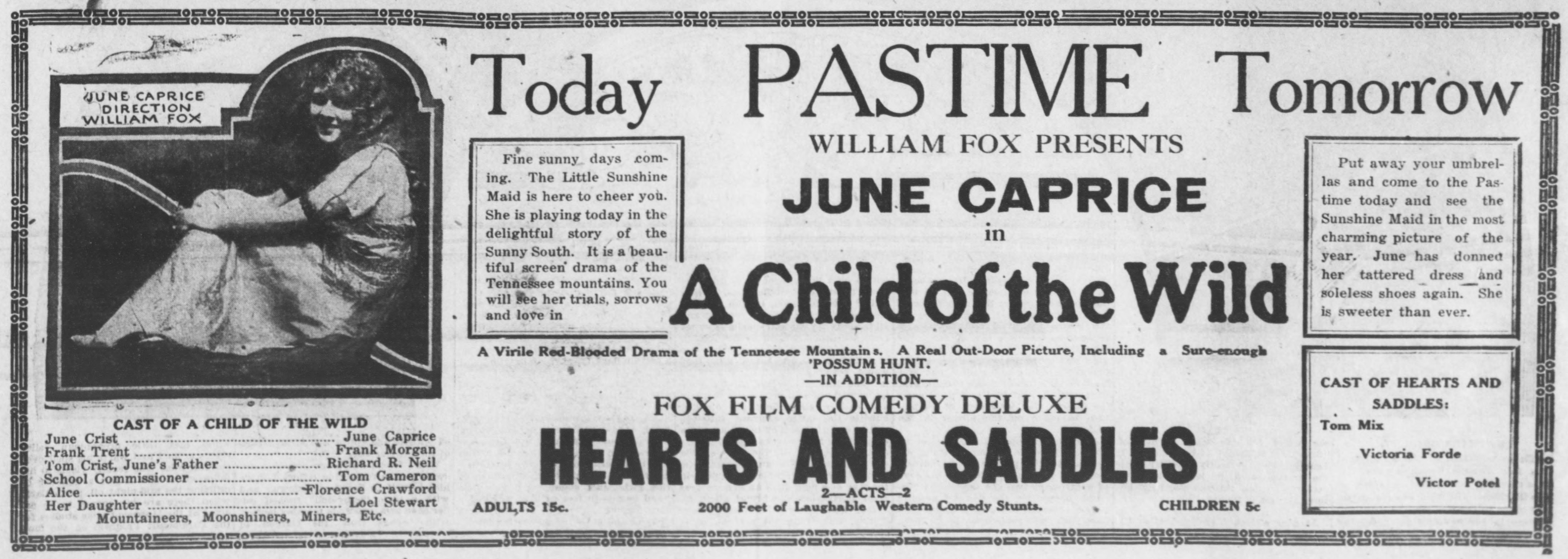
- Newspaper advertisement
- Directed by: John G. Adolfi
- Written by: John Kellette; John G. Adolfi
- Produced by: William Fox
- Starring: June Caprice; Frank Morgan; Jane Lee
- Production company: Fox Film Corporation
- Distributed by: Fox Film Corporation
- Release date: February 26, 1917
- Country: United States
- Languages: Silent; English intertitles

A Child of the Wild is a 1917 American silent drama film directed by John G. Adolfi and starring June Caprice, Frank Morgan and Jane Lee.

Another film of the same name was released in 1910 by Bison Film Company.

== Cast ==
- June Caprice as June Griest
- Frank Morgan as Frank Trent
- Tom Brooke as June's Father
- Richard Neill as Bob Gale
- Jane Lee as Jane
- John W. Kellette as A Tramp
- John G. Adolfi as A Tramp

== Bibliography ==
- Solomon, Aubrey. The Fox Film Corporation, 1915-1935: A History and Filmography. McFarland, 2011.
