= Aftermath (1914 film) =

- Based on: Aftermath play by William Addison Hervey
- Produced by: Daniel Frohman; Adolph Zukor
- Starring: Owen Moore; Virginia Pearson
- Production company: Famous Players Film Company
- Distributed by: State Rights
- Release date: August 20, 1914
- Running time: 4 reels
- Country: USA
- Languages: Silent, English titles

Aftermath is a lost 1914 American silent drama film produced by Daniel Frohman and Adolph Zukor. The film was produced by Famous Players Film Company and was released on a State Rights basis.

== Plot summary ==
Young Ruth Morgan, an orphan, decides to leave her small town to make her fortune in the big city. Meanwhile, in another small down, young doctor Allan Buchannan also decides to strike out for the big city. Unfortunately, Ruth falls in love with a rich playboy who soon betrays her, and Allan makes a tragic mistake by accidentally prescribing a drug that results in a child's death. Soon afterwards he learns that his sister has died in a train accident. Despondent and grief-stricken, he walks to a nearby river, intending to end it all by jumping in. There he meets Ruth, who is there for the same purpose.

== Cast ==
- Owen Moore — Allan Buchannan
- Virginia Pearson — Ruth Morgan

== Preservation ==
With no holdings located in archives, Aftermath is considered a lost film.
