= Edna Hunter =

American actress (1876–1920)

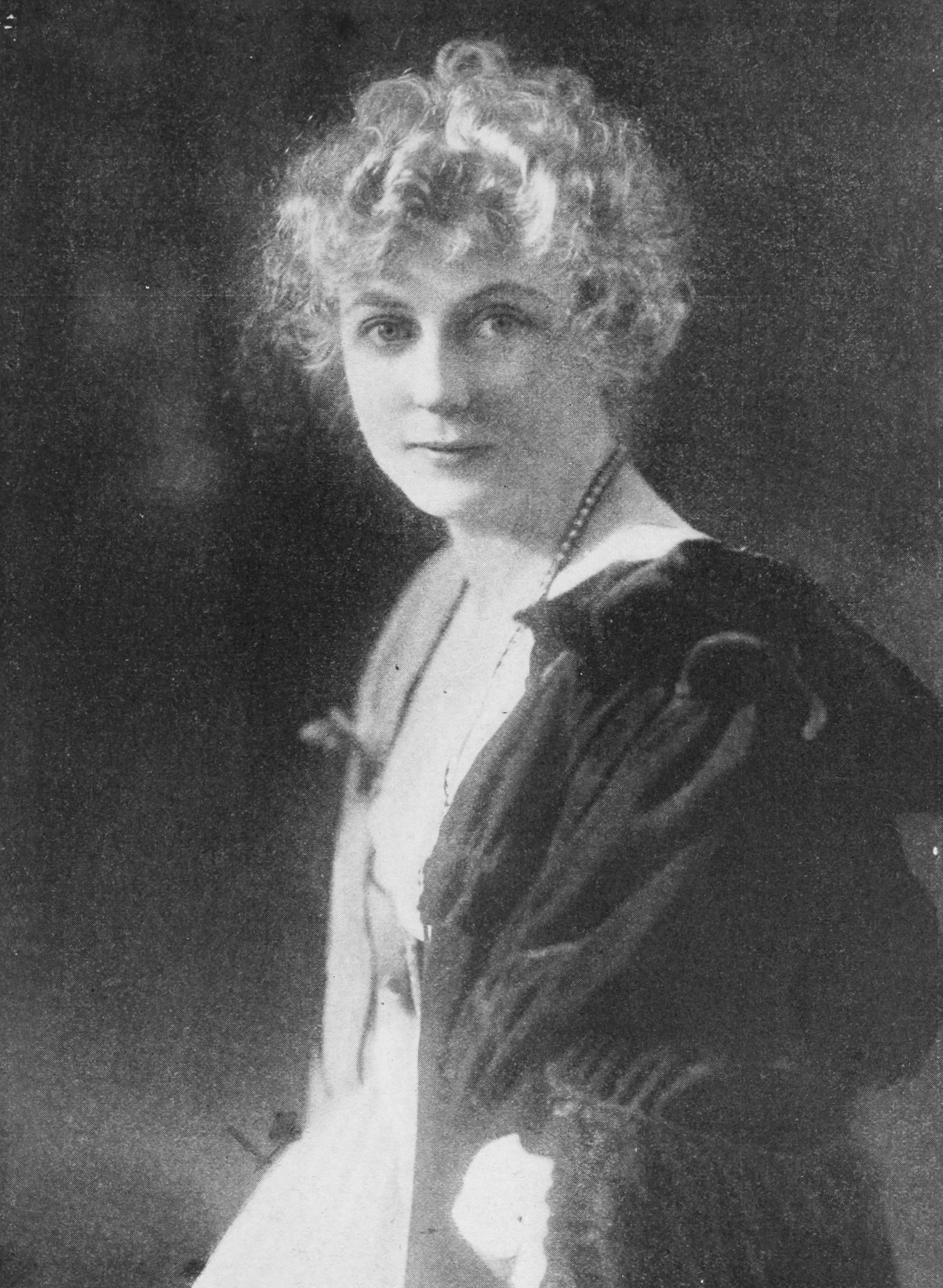
- Edna Hunter, from a 1917 publication
- Born: April 9, 1876; Attica, Indiana
- Died: February 5, 1920 (aged 43); New York City
- Other name: Edna Hunter Wood
- Occupation: Actress

Edna Hunter (April 9, 1876 – February 5, 1920) was an American stage and film actress of the silent film era, who appeared in more than a dozen films between 1915 and 1918.

== Early life ==
Hunter was born in Attica, Indiana and raised in Toledo, Ohio, the daughter of Samuel Hunter and Emma Hunter (later Brownlee). Her stepfather Charles Brownlee was a railroad conductor.

== Career ==
Hunter performed on Broadway from 1898 to 1914, with parts in the shows The Runaway Girl (1898), Chris and the Wonderful Lamp (1900), Foxy Quiller (In Corsica) (1900), The Strollers (1901), The Liberty Belles (1901), Florodora (1902), Tom, Dick and Harry (1905), Girlies (1910), The Girl in the Train (1910), Over the River (1912), and Papa's Darling (1914).

Hunter appeared in more than a dozen full-length silent films and many short films, including A Witch of Salem Town (1915), You Can't Always Tell (1915), A Strange Disappearance (1915), The Marble Heart (1915), Crime's Triangle (1915),The Woman Who Lied (1915), The Reward (1915), Man or Money? (1915), Almost a Papa (1915), The Law of Life (1916), The Hoax House (1916), Patterson of the News (1916), The Haunted Bell (1916), Through Flames to Love (1916), Won with a Make-Up (1916), Half a Rogue (1916), Jim Slocum No. 46393 (1916), The Fool (1916), The Head of the Family (1916), The Man Across the Street (1916), The Circular Room (1916), A Lucky Gold Piece (1916), The Captain of the Typhoon (1916), The Laugh of Scorn (1916), The Lie Sublime (1916), In the Heart of New York (1916), The Common Law (1916), A Prince in a Pawnshop (1916), Are You an Elk? (1916), A Wife's Folly (1917), Jimmie Dale Alias the Grey Seal (1917), Two Little Imps (1917), The Co-respondent (1917), The Naulahka (1918), De Luxe Annie (1918), and The Unchastened Woman (1918). She co-starred with King Baggot in several movies.

Hunter was often described as a "beauty" and as athletic, skilled in swimming, riding, ice skating, tennis, and golf. In 1916 she was selected as "Miss Personal Beauty" by delegates from 35 motion picture companies, to star in a special film marking the Shakespeare tercentenary. During World War I, she was active in the Motion Picture Players division of Stage Women's War Relief.

== Personal life ==
Hunter married "nautical artist" Worden G. Wood in 1903. They had two children, Emily and Hunter, before they divorced in 1912. She died in the Spanish flu pandemic in 1920, aged 43 years. Her son Hunter Wood became an artist best known for seascapes and nautical scenes, like his father.
