= A Sawmill Hazard =

1913 film

- Directed by: Kenean Buel
- Produced by: Kalem Company
- Starring: Alice Hollister; Earle Foxe; Helen Lindroth; Robert G. Vignola; Miriam Cooper
- Distributed by: General Film Company
- Release date: January 11, 1913 (US)
- Country: United States
- Languages: Silent film English intertitles

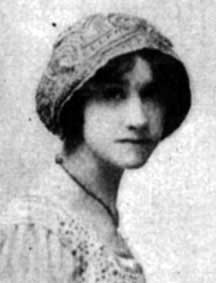
The film starred Alice Hollister

A Sawmill Hazard is a 1913 American short silent film drama starring Earle Foxe and Alice Hollister.

== Cast ==
- Alice Hollister
- Earle Foxe
- Helen Lindroth
- Robert G. Vignola
- Miriam Cooper
