= Mercy on a Crutch =

- Directed by: Jack Harvey
- Starring: Helen Fulton, John Lehnberg, and Carey L. Hastings
- Production company: Thanhouser Company
- Release date: July 13, 1915
- Country: USA
- Language: Silent

Mercy on a Crutch is a 1915 American short silent drama film, directed by Jack Harvey for the Thanhouser Company. It stars Helen Fulton, John Lehnberg, and Carey L. Hastings.

== Plot ==
Mercy is born in a mining camp and unfortunately loses her parents in a flood. She is then raised by her cruel relatives. While young, she is badly injured and must choose between never walking again or using a crutch for life - she chooses the crutch. In the rough town of Rhyolite there is no place for a disabled girl and Mercy grows up lonely and ignored by others her age.

One day a quiet stranger rides into town and avoids attention. When a man cruelly snatches Mercy’s crutch, the stranger steps in and forces him to return it. Soon after the stranger leaves town. Days later Mercy overhears the sheriff say that an outlaw named Wiley will be captured that day. Mercy fears the stranger is the one being hunted since she has seen him hiding in the nearby mountains.

Determined to help him Mercy rides into the hills and finds the stranger wounded in a cave. When the sheriff’s posse surrounds the cave Mercy stands guard with a rifle and refuses to let them approach. The sheriff then reveals the truth. The stranger is Ned Franey - a newly appointed marshal who has captured the outlaw after a fierce fight. The posse arrests the prisoner and agrees to take him for trial instead of lynching him.

After the danger passes Franey speaks kindly to Mercy and learns her name. His warmth and admiration bring Mercy happiness for the first time in her life.

== Characters ==
Helen Fulton as Mercy Tanner.

John Lehnberg as The Sheriff.

Helen Badgley as The Sheriff's Daughter.
