= Silver Threads Among the Gold (1915 film) =

1915 film by Pierce Kingsley and R. R. Roberts

Silver Threads Among the Gold is a 1915 American silent film starring countertenor Richard Jose. In the film, Jose performs the popular song Silver Threads Among the Gold. The six-reel film was produced by Pierce Kingsley and R. R. Roberts for the K & R film Company.

The film was unusual for the time, as each exhibition hired a performer to sing live in the wings, in a reversal of lip-synch.

This film was also the earliest known "talkie" film.

== Cast ==
- Guy D'Ennery as Tom
- Dora Dean as Mary Chester
- Mrs. R.E. French as Martin's wife
- Richard J. Jose as Martin
- Dick Lee
- Jane Lee
- Katherine Lee (credited as Catherine Lee)
- Jim McCabe
- Jack Ridgeway as Judge Walcott (credited as Jack Ridgway)
