= Mary Martin (silent film actress) =

American actress

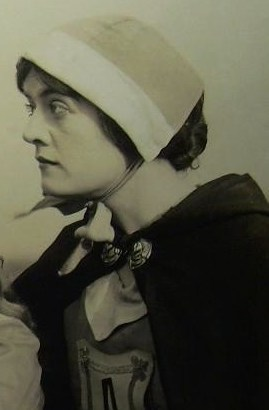
- Martin in a publicity still for The Scarlet Letter in 1917
- Born: Norma Martin
- Occupation: Silent film actress
- Spouse: Rae Berger

Mary Martin (born Norma Martin, and sometimes credited as Marty Martin, especially early on in her career) was a silent film actress who was active in Hollywood in the 1910s. Mary was born in Fresno, California. In 1914, she moved to Santa Barbara, where she quickly began appearing in a string of silent films with the American Film Company, also known as Flying A Studios. She married actor-director Rae Berger in 1916 and seems to have retired from acting around 1917.

== Selected filmography ==
- A Modern Othello (1914)
- A Modern Rip Van Winkle (1914)
- The Birth of Emotion (1914)
- Greater Love Hath No Man (1915)
- The Vampire (1915)
- The Honeymooners (1915)
- The Wonderful Adventure (1915)
- Good Out of Evil (1915)
- The Broken Law (1915)
- Some Night (1916)
- Hazel Kirke (1916)
- The Eternal Sappho (1916)
- Daredevil Kate (1916)
- The Vixen (1916)
- The Scarlet Letter (1917)
- The Tiger Woman (1917)
- The Derelict (1917)
- The Heart of a Lion (1917)
