= Virginia Pearson =

American actress (1886–1958)

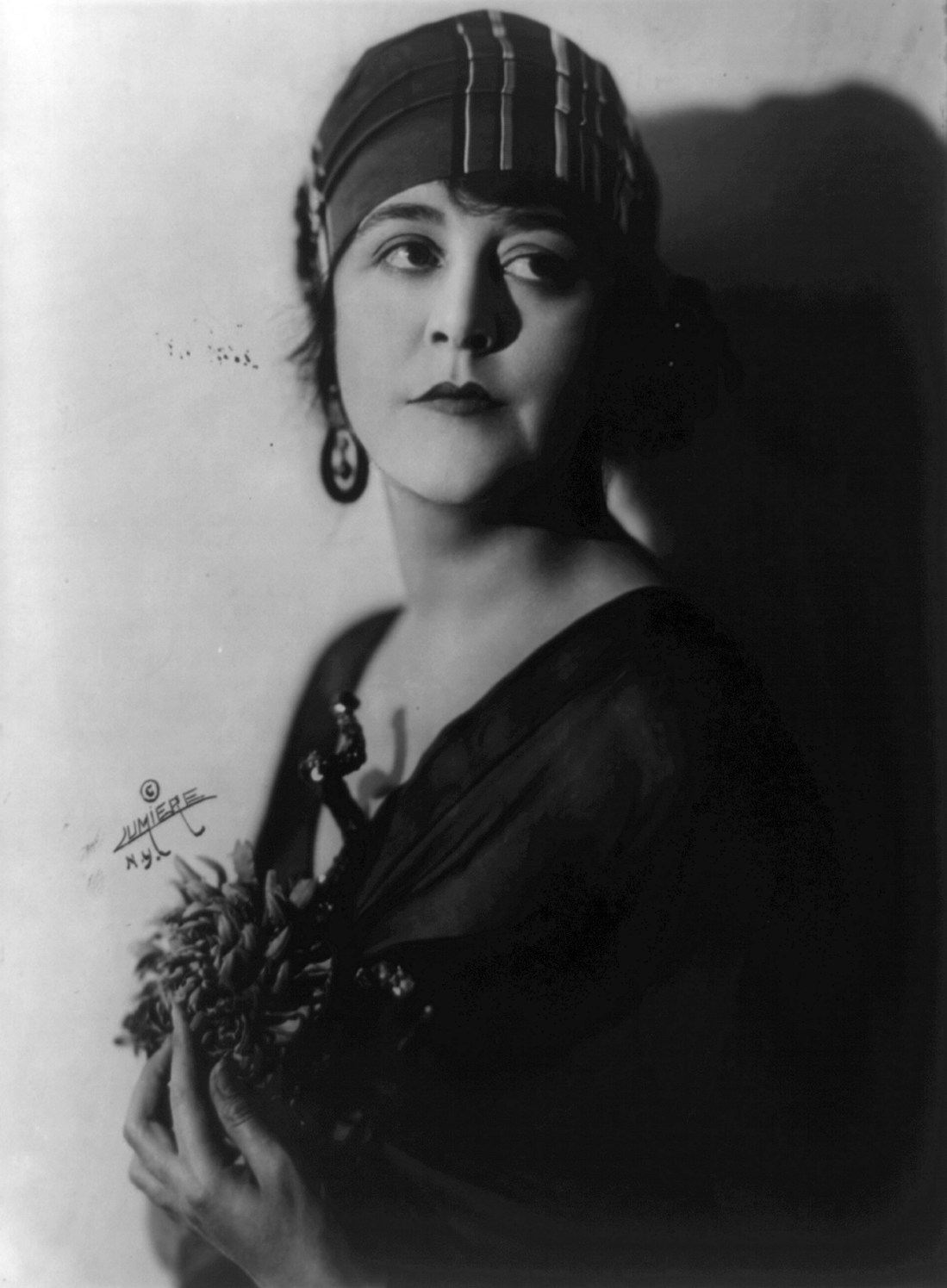
- Pearson, circa 1918
- Born: Virginia Belle Pearson; March 7, 1886; Anchorage, Kentucky, U.S.
- Died: June 6, 1958 (aged 72); Hollywood, Los Angeles, California, U.S.
- Occupation: Actress
- Years active: 1910–1932
- Spouse: Sheldon Lewis
- Relatives: Betty Grable (second-cousin)

Virginia Belle Pearson (March 7, 1886 – June 6, 1958) was an American stage and film actress. She made 51 films in a career which extended from 1910 until 1932.

== Career ==
She was born on March 7, 1886, in Anchorage, Kentucky to Joseph F. Pearson (1855–1923) and Mary Alice Calloway (1863–1914).

She had one younger brother, Harvey Thompson Pearson. Virginia was also the granddaughter of Precious Martha Grable Pearson (actress Betty Grable's great aunt). Virginia worked for a brief time as an assistant in the public library in Louisville, Kentucky after completing school. She was famous in her hometown Louisville playhouse performances. Pearson trained in the tradition of the stars of the American stage, and played in stock productions in Washington, D.C. and New York City. In New York, she played the heroine in Hypocrisy, a story which laid bare "the shame of society." She was promoted by William Fox of Fox Film Corporation for the same kind of strong vamp parts as those played by Theda Bara. Among her movies is Blazing Love (1916), Wildness of Youth (1922), The Vital Question (1916), Sister Against Sister (1917), The Red Kimona (1925), The Wizard of Oz (1925), and The Phantom of the Opera (1925).

In 1916 Pearson and her husband, movie actor Sheldon Lewis, severed their ties with the Virginia Pearson Producing Company. The couple affiliated themselves with the Independent Productions Company. In 1924, the couple were forced to declare bankruptcy. In 1928, Pearson was divorced from Lewis. At the time, it was not considered good "box office" for screen actresses to be married. However the two remained constant companions, and resided for many years at the old Hollywood Hotel. Later they lived at the Motion Picture Country Home.

== Death ==
Virginia Pearson died of uremic poisoning in Hollywood, California on June 6, 1958, nearly a month to the day after Sheldon Lewis. She was 72. Funeral services were held at the Pierce Brothers Hollywood Chapel. She was buried in an unmarked grave in Valhalla Memorial Park Cemetery.

== Selected filmography ==
Year	Title	Role	Notes
1910	On Her Doorsteps		
1914	The Stain	Stevens' daughter	
1914	Aftermath	Ruth Morgan	
1915	The Turn of the Road	Marcia Wilbur	
1916	Thou Art the Man	Emily Raynor	
1916	Daredevil Kate	Kate	
1917	A Royal Romance	The Princess Sylvia	
1917	Thou Shalt Not Steal	Mary Bruce	
1917	Wrath of Love		
1918	The Firebrand	Princess Natalya	
1919	The Bishop's Emeralds	Hester, Lady Cardew	
1922	Wildness of Youth	Louise Wesley	
1923	A Prince of a King	Queen Claudia	
1925	Wizard of Oz	Lady Vishuss	
1925	The Phantom of the Opera	Virginia Pearson as Carlotta/Carlotta's mother (1929 redux)	
1926	Atta Boy	Madame Carlton	
1926	The Taxi Mystery	Mrs Blaine Jameson	
1927	Driven from Home		
1928	The Power of Silence	Mrs. Wright	
1928	The Big City	Tennessee	
1928	The Actress	Mrs. Telfer	
1929	Smilin' Guns	Mrs. van Smythe	
1931	Primrose Path	Marie Randeau	
1932	Back Street	bit part	uncredited

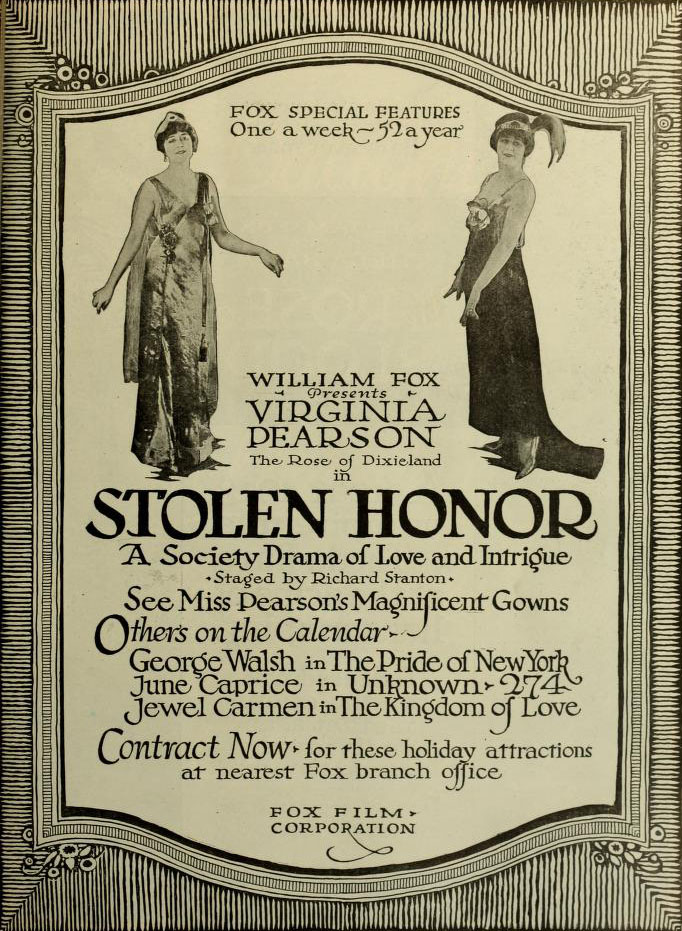
Stolen Honor (1917)

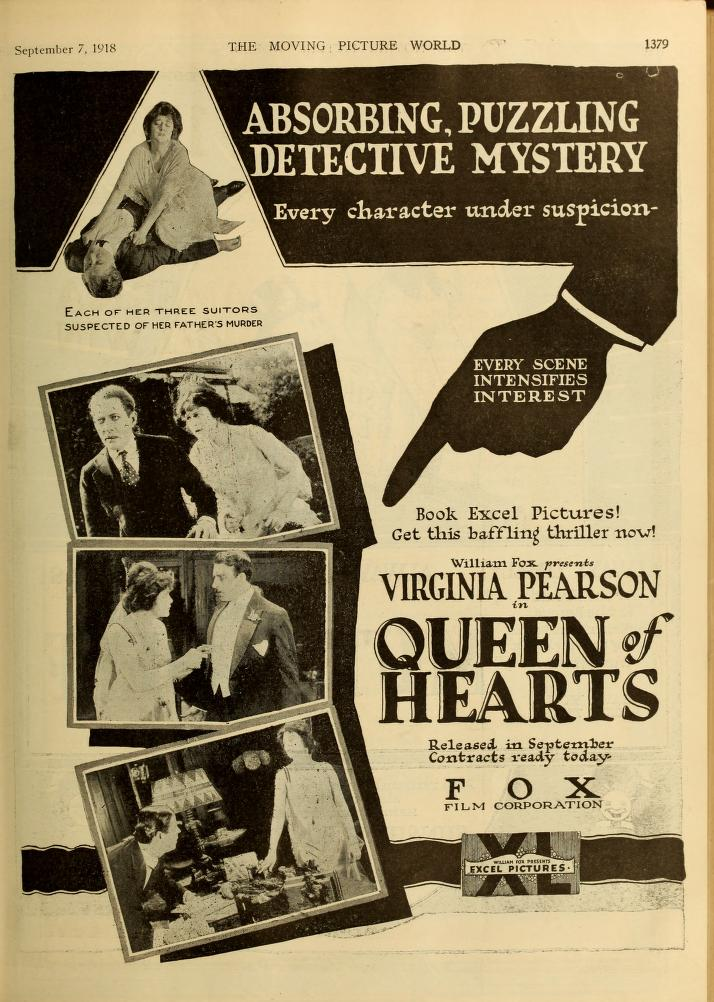
Queen of Hearts (1918)

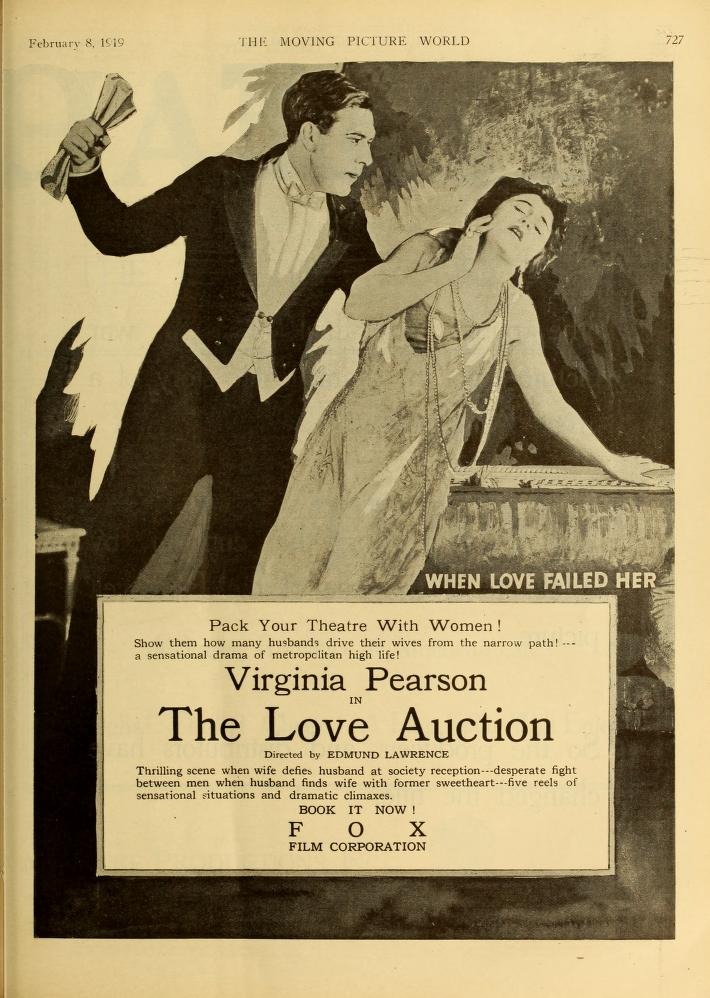
The Love Auction (1919)

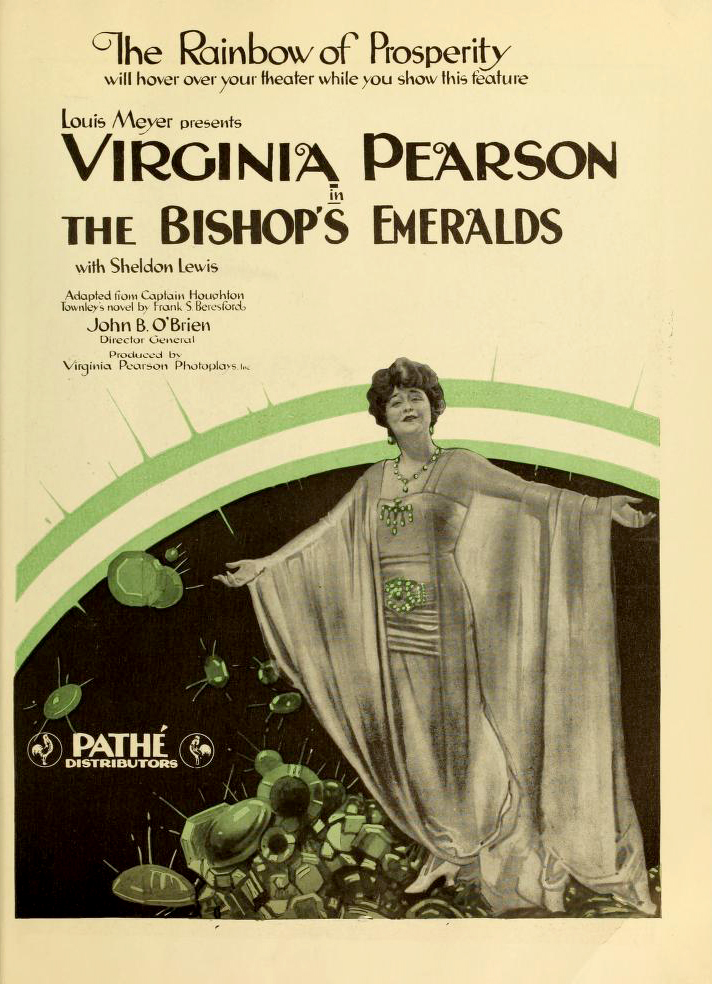
The Bishop's Emeralds (1919)
