= My Little Sister (1919 film) =

1919 film by Kenean Buel

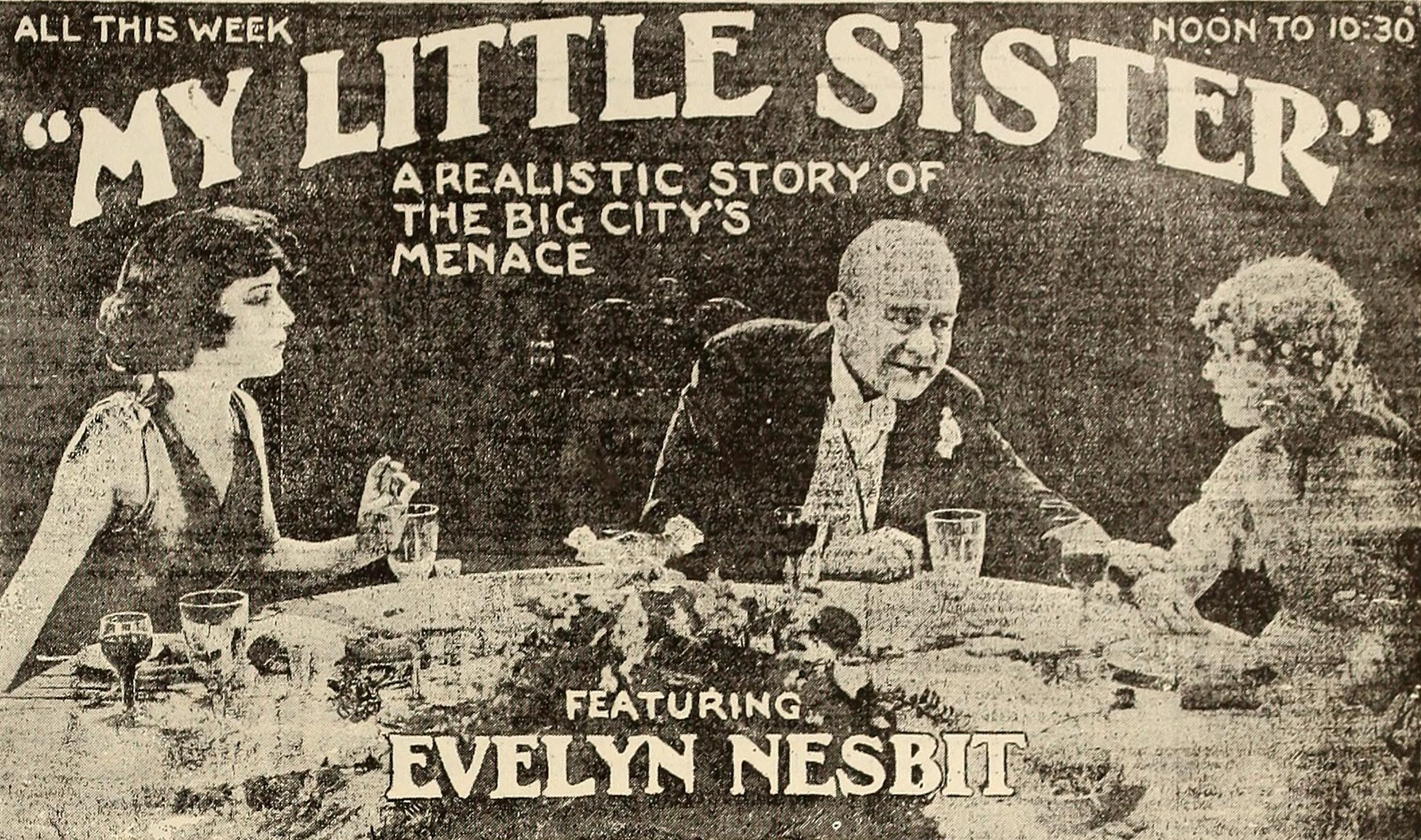
- Magazine advertisement
- Directed by: Kenean Buel; John W. Kellette
- Written by: Kenean Buel
- Based on: a novel by Elizabeth Robins
- Produced by: William Fox
- Starring: Evelyn Nesbit
- Cinematography: Joseph Ruttenberg
- Distributed by: Fox Film Corporation
- Release date: June 15, 1919
- Running time: 5 reels

My Little Sister is a lost 1919 silent film drama directed by Kenean Buel and starring Evelyn Nesbit. It was produced and distributed by the Fox Film Corporation.

== Cast ==
- Evelyn Nesbit – The Elder Sister
- Leslie Austin – Eric (*Leslie Austen)
- Lillian Hall – Bettina
- Kempton Greene – Ranny
- Lyster Chambers – The Stranger
- Herbert Standing – Guy Whitby Dawson
- Carolyn Lee – Madame Aurore (*Caroline Lee)
- Amelia Summerville – The Gray Hawk
- Ben Hendricks – The Colonel
- Louise Rial – Aunt Josephine
- Martha Mayo – The Sisters' Mother
- Marie Burke – Lady Helmstone
- Henry Hallam – Lord Helmstone
- Lucille Carney – Lady Barbara

== See also ==
- 1937 Fox vault fire
