= Kenean Buel =

American film director

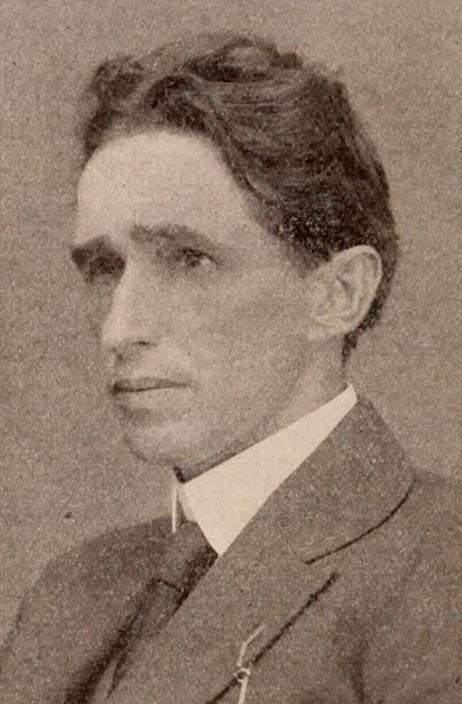
Buel in 1917

Kenean J. Buel (c.1873 – November 5, 1948) was an American film director during the silent era.

== Biography ==
Born in Kentucky, Buel became involved in theater and eventually made his way to New York City where he was hired by the Kalem Company in 1908 as a film director under the tutelage of Sidney Olcott. Buel was part of the pioneering Kalem team that filmed in Florida in the winter months and in the fall of 1910, the rapidly growing Kalem organization sent him to head up a filming unit in California.

After directing more than 50 films for Kalem, including a number starring Alice Joyce, Buel signed on with Fox Film Corporation in 1915 for whom he made another seventeen films. In 1919 he directed films for an independent company and made his last film in 1920.

Kenean Buel died in New York City in 1948.

== Partial filmography ==
- As You Like It (1912)
- The Bugler of Battery B (1912)
- The Siege of Petersburg (1912)
- Tide of Battle (1912)
- The Darling of the CSA (1912)
- Battle in the Virginia Hills (1912)
- War's Havoc (1912)
- The Battle of Pottsburg Bridge (1912)
- The Drummer Girl of Vicksburg (1912)
- The Confederate Ironclad (1912)
- A Sawmill Hazard (1913)
- A Desperate Chance (1913)
- The Brand (film) (1914)
- Blazing Love (1916)
- Two Little Imps (1917)
- The Bitter Truth (1917)
- The New York Peacock (1917)
- She (1917)
- The Woman Who Gave (1918)
- A Fallen Idol (1919)
- My Little Sister (1919)
- The Place of Honeymoons (1920)
