= List of American films of 1917 =

Including foreign productions, the total number of feature-length motion pictures released in the U.S. in 1917 is at least 687.

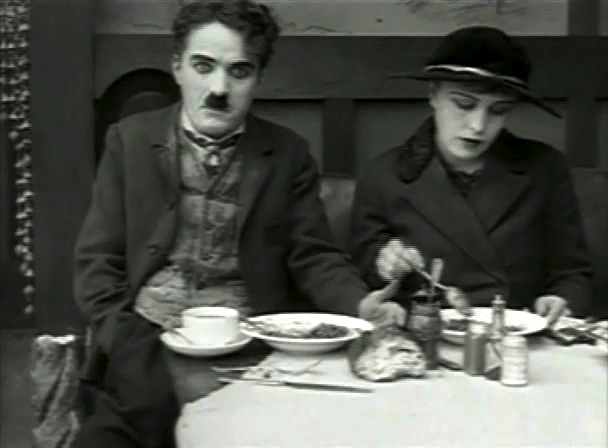
The Immigrant

== A–B ==
Title	Director	Cast	Genre	Notes
'49–'17	Ruth Ann Baldwin	Joseph W. Girard, William J. Dyer	Western	Universal
The Accomplice	Ralph Dean	Dorothy Bernard, Jack Sherrill, Jean Stuart	Drama	Independent
The Adopted Son	Charles Brabin	Francis X. Bushman, Beverly Bayne	Drama	Metro
Adventures of Carol	Harley Knoles	Madge Evans, George MacQuarrie, Rosina Henley	Drama	World Film
An Alabaster Box	Chester Withey	Alice Joyce, Marc McDermott, Harry Ham	Drama	Vitagraph
Aladdin and the Wonderful Lamp	Chester Franklin, Sidney Franklin	Francis Carpenter, Virginia Lee Corbin, Alfred Paget	Fantasy	Fox
Aladdin from Broadway	William Wolbert	Edith Storey, Antonio Moreno	Adventure	Vitagraph
Aladdin's Other Lamp	John H. Collins	Viola Dana, Robert Walker	Comedy	Metro
Alias Mrs. Jessop	Will S. Davis	Emily Stevens, Howard Hall	Comedy	Metro
Alimony	Emmett J. Flynn	Lois Wilson, George Fisher	Drama	First National
All for a Husband	Carl Harbaugh	Herbert Evans, Virginia Pearson	Comedy	Fox
Alma, Where Do You Live?	Hal Clarendon	Ruth MacTammany, George Larkin	Comedy	Independent
An Amateur Orphan	Van Dyke Brooke	Gladys Leslie, Thomas A. Curran	Comedy	Pathe Exchange
The Amazons	Joseph Kaufman	Marguerite Clark, Edgar Norton	Comedy	Paramount
The American Consul	Rollin S. Sturgeon	Theodore Roberts, Ernest Joy	Drama	Paramount
American Maid	Albert Capellani	Edna Goodrich, William B. Davidson	Drama	Mutual
American Methods	Frank Lloyd	William Farnum, Jewel Carmen	Drama	Fox
American - That's All	Arthur Rosson	Winifred Allen, Walter Walker	Comedy	Triangle
An American Widow	Frank Reicher	Ethel Barrymore, Irving Cummings	Comedy	Metro
The Angel Factory	Lawrence B. McGill	Antonio Moreno, Helene Chadwick, Armand Cortes	Drama	Pathé Exchange
Annie-for-Spite	James Kirkwood	Mary Miles Minter, George Fisher	Drama	Mutual
The Antics of Ann	Edward Dillon	Ann Pennington, Crauford Kent	Comedy	Paramount
Anything Once	Joe De Grasse	Franklyn Farnum, Lon Chaney	Drama	Universal
Apartment 29	Paul Scardon	Earle Williams, Ethel Grey Terry	Mystery	Vitagraph
The Apple Tree Girl	Alan Crosland	Shirley Mason, Raymond McKee	Drama	Edison
The Argyle Case	Ralph Ince	Robert Warwick, Elaine Hammerstein	Mystery	Selznick
Arms and the Girl	Joseph Kaufman	Billie Burke, Thomas Meighan	Drama	Paramount
Arsene Lupin	Paul Scardon	Earle Williams, Brinsley Shaw	Mystery	Vitagraph
As Man Made Her	George Archainbaud	Gail Kane, Edward Langford, Gerda Holmes	Drama	World Film
As Men Love	E. Mason Hopper	House Peters Sr., Myrtle Stedman, Jack W. Johnston	Drama	Paramount
Ashes of Hope	Walter Edwards (director)	Belle Bennett, Jack Livingston	Western	Triangle
At First Sight	Robert Z. Leonard	Mae Murray, Sam Hardy	Comedy	Paramount
The Auction Block	Laurence Trimble	Rubye De Remer, Florence Deshon	Drama	Goldwyn
The Auction of Virtue	Herbert Blaché	Naomi Childers, Wyndham Standing	Drama	Independent
The Avenging Trail	Francis Ford	Harold Lockwood, Sally Crute	Drama	Metro
The Awakening	George Archainbaud	Montagu Love, Dorothy Kelly	Drama	World Film
The Awakening of Ruth	Edward H. Griffith	Shirley Mason, Donald Hall	Drama	Edison
Bab the Fixer	Sherwood MacDonald	Jackie Saunders, Mollie McConnell	Comedy	Mutual
Bab's Burglar	J. Searle Dawley	Marguerite Clark, Richard Barthelmess	Comedy	Paramount
Bab's Diary	J. Searle Dawley	Marguerite Clark, Nigel Barrie	Comedy	Paramount
Bab's Matinee Idol	J. Searle Dawley	Marguerite Clark, Nigel Barrie	Comedy	Paramount
Babbling Tongues	William Humphrey	Arthur Donaldson, Grace Valentine	Drama	Independent
The Babes in the Woods	Sidney Franklin, Chester Franklin	Francis Carpenter, Virginia Lee Corbin	Fantasy	Fox Film
Babette	Charles Brabin	Marc McDermott, Peggy Hyland	Drama	Vitagraph
Baby Mine	John S. Robertson, Hugo Ballin	Madge Kennedy, Kathryn Adams, Frank Morgan	Comedy	Goldwyn
Back of the Man	Reginald Barker	Dorothy Dalton, Charles Ray	Drama	Triangle
The Bad Boy	Chester Withey	Robert Harron, Richard Cummings	Crime drama	Triangle
The Bar Sinister	Edgar Lewis	Hedda Nova, Mitchell Lewis	Drama	Independent
Barbary Sheep	Maurice Tourneur	Elsie Ferguson, Lumsden Hare	Drama	Paramount
The Barker	Joseph A. Richmond	Lew Fields, Pat O'Malley	Drama	Selig
Barnaby Lee	Edward H. Griffith	William Wadsworth, Claire Adams	Drama	Edison
The Barricade	Edwin Carewe	Mabel Taliaferro, Frank Currier, Clifford Bruce	Drama	Metro
The Barrier	Edgar Lewis	Mabel Julienne Scott, Russell Simpson, Howard Hall	Western drama	Independent
The Beautiful Adventure	Dell Henderson	Ann Murdock, David Powell	Drama	Mutual
The Beautiful Lie	John W. Noble	Frances Nelson, Harry S. Northrup	Drama	Metro
Because of a Woman	Jack Conway	Belle Bennett, George Chesebro	Drama	Triangle
Behind the Mask	Alice Guy	Catherine Calvert, Richard Tucker	Drama	Independent
The Beloved Adventuress	William A. Brady	Kitty Gordon, Jack Drumier	Drama	World
Beloved Jim	Stuart Paton	Harry Carter, Priscilla Dean	Drama	Universal
Beloved Rogues	Alfred Santell	Clarence Kolb, Clarence Burton	Comedy	Mutual
The Best Man	Bertram Bracken	Gordon Sackville, Margaret Landis	Drama	General
Betsy Ross	Travers Vale	Alice Brady, John Bowers, Lillian Cook	Historical	World
Betsy's Burglar	Paul Powell	Constance Talmadge, Kenneth Harlan	Comedy	Triangle
Betty and the Buccaneers	Rollin S. Sturgeon	Joe King, Hal Wilson	Adventure	Mutual
Betty Be Good	Sherwood MacDonald	Jackie Saunders, Arthur Shirley	Comedy	Mutual
Betty to the Rescue	Frank Reicher	Fannie Ward, Lillian Leighton	Comedy	Paramount
Betrayed	Raoul Walsh	Miriam Cooper, Hobart Bosworth	Drama	Fox
Beware of Strangers	Colin Campbell	Fritzi Brunette, Tom Santschi	Drama	Selig
Big Timber	William Desmond Taylor	Wallace Reid, Kathlyn Williams	Drama	Paramount
Billy and the Big Stick	Edward H. Griffith	Raymond McKee, William Wadsworth	Comedy	Edison
The Birth of Patriotism	E. Magnus Ingleton	Irene Hunt, Ann Forrest	War	Universal
A Bit o' Heaven	Lule Warrenton	Carl Miller, Gertrude Short	Drama	Independent
A Bit of Kindling	Sherwood MacDonald	Jackie Saunders, Arthur Shirley	Drama	Mutual
The Bitter Truth	Kenean Buel	Virginia Pearson, William H. Tooker	Drama	Fox
Black Orchids	Rex Ingram	Cleo Madison, Francis McDonald	Drama	Universal
The Black Wolf	Frank Reicher	Nell Shipman, Lou Tellegen	Drama	Paramount
Blind Man's Holiday	Martin Justice	Jean Paige, Carlton S. King	Drama	Vitagraph
Blind Man's Luck	George Fitzmaurice	Helene Chadwick, Mollie King, Earle Foxe	Drama	Pathé Exchange
The Blood of His Fathers	Harrish Ingraham	Crane Wilbur, Jode Mullally, Ruth King	Drama	Independent
Blood Will Tell	Charles Miller	William Desmond, Enid Markey, David Hartford	Drama	Triangle
Blue Jeans	John H. Collins	Viola Dana, Robert D. Walker	Drama	Metro
The Blue Streak	William Nigh	William Nigh, Violet Palmer	Western	Fox
The Bond Between	Donald Crisp	George Beban, Nigel De Brulier	Drama	Paramount
Bond of Fear	Jack Conway	Roy Stewart, Belle Bennett, Melbourne MacDowell	Western	Triangle
Bondage	Ida May Park	Dorothy Phillips, Gretchen Lederer	Drama	Universal
The Bondage of Fear	Travers Vale	Ethel Clayton, Edward Kimball	Drama	World
The Book Agent	Otis Turner	George Walsh, Doris Pawn	Comedy	Fox
Borrowed Plumage	Raymond B. West	Bessie Barriscale, Arthur Maude	Comedy	Triangle
The Boss of the Lazy Y	Clifford Smith	Roy Stewart, Josie Sedgwick, Frank MacQuarrie	Western	Triangle
The Bottle Imp	Marshall Neilan	Sessue Hayakawa, George Kuwa	Fantasy	Paramount
The Bottom of the Well	John S. Robertson	Agnes Ayres, Adele DeGarde, Herbert Prior	Drama	Vitagraph
The Boy Girl	Edwin Stevens	Violet Mersereau, Sidney Mason	Comedy	Universal
The Brand of Satan	George Archainbaud	Montagu Love, Gerda Holmes, Evelyn Greeley	Horror	World
A Branded Soul	Bertram Bracken	Gladys Brockwell, Colin Chase	Drama	Fox
The Bride of Hate	Walter Edwards	Frank Keenan, Margery Wilson, Jerome Storm	Drama	Triangle
The Bride's Silence	Henry King	Gail Kane, Lew Cody	Drama	Mutual Film
Bridges Burned	Perry N. Vekroff	Olga Petrova, Mahlon Hamilton	Drama	Metro
Bringing Home Father	William Worthington	Franklyn Farnum, Agnes Vernon	Comedy	Universal
Broadway Arizona	Lynn Reynolds	Olive Thomas, George Chesebro, George Hernandez	Drama	Triangle
Broadway Jones	Joseph Kaufman	George M. Cohan, Marguerite Snow, Crauford Kent	Comedy	Paramount
The Broadway Sport	Carl Harbaugh	Stuart Holmes, Wanda Hawley	Comedy	Fox
The Bronze Bride	Henry MacRae	Claire McDowell, Frank Mayo	Drama	Universal
Bucking Broadway	John Ford	Harry Carey, Molly Malone	Western	Universal
Builders of Castles	Ben Turbett	Marc McDermott, Miriam Nesbitt	Drama	Edison
The Burglar	Harley Knoles	Carlyle Blackwell, Madge Evans, Evelyn Greeley	Drama	World Film
Burning the Candle	Harry Beaumont	Henry B. Walthall, Mary Charleson	Drama	Essanay
The Butterfly Girl	Henry Otto	Margarita Fischer, Jack Mower	Drama	Mutual
By Right of Possession	William Wolbert	Antonio Moreno, Otto Lederer	Western	Vitagraph

== C–D ==
Title	Director	Cast	Genre	Notes
The Calendar Girl	Rollin S. Sturgeon	Ashton Dearholt, Clarissa Selwynne	Comedy	Mutual
The Call of Her People	John W. Noble	Ethel Barrymore, William B. Davidson, Frank Montgomery	Drama	Metro
The Call of the East	George Melford	Sessue Hayakawa, Tsuru Aoki, Jack Holt	Drama	Paramount
Camille	J. Gordon Edwards	Theda Bara, Alan Roscoe, Claire Whitney	Drama	Fox
The Candy Girl	Eugene Moore	Gladys Hulette, J. H. Gilmour	Drama	Pathé Exchange
Captain of the Gray Horse Troop	William Wolbert	Antonio Moreno, Edith Storey	Western	Vitagraph
The Car of Chance	William Worthington	Franklyn Farnum, Agnes Vernon	Drama	Universal
A Case at Law	Arthur Rosson	Richard Rosson, Pauline Curley	Drama	Triangle
Cassidy	Arthur Rosson	Richard Rosson, Frank Currier, Pauline Curley	Drama	Triangle
Castles for Two	Frank Reicher	Marie Doro, Elliott Dexter	Drama	Paramount
Charity Castle	Lloyd Ingraham	Mary Miles Minter, Allan Forrest	Comedy	Mutual
The Charmer	Jack Conway	Ella Hall, Belle Bennett, Martha Mattox	Drama	Universal
The Checkmate	Sherwood MacDonald	Jackie Saunders, Frank Mayo	Drama	Mutual
Cheerful Givers	Paul Powell	Bessie Love, Kenneth Harlan	Comedy	Triangle
Chicken Casey	Raymond B. West	Dorothy Dalton, Charles Gunn, Howard Hickman	Drama	Triangle
A Child of the Wild	John G. Adolfi	June Caprice, Frank Morgan	Drama	Fox Film
Chris and His Wonderful Lamp	Alan Crosland	Claire Adams, William Wadsworth	Fantasy	Edison
The Cigarette Girl	William Parke	Gladys Hulette, Warner Oland	Drama	Pathe Exchange
The Cinderella Man	George Loane Tucker	Mae Marsh, Tom Moore, Alec B. Francis	Comedy	Goldwyn
The Circus of Life	Rupert Julian, Elsie Jane Wilson	Mignon Anderson, Harry Carter	Drama	Universal
The Clean-Up	William Worthington	Franklyn Farnum, Agnes Vernon	Comedy western	Universal
Cleopatra	J. Gordon Edwards	Theda Bara, Fritz Leiber Sr., Thurston Hall	Historical	Fox
The Clever Mrs. Carfax	Donald Crisp	Julian Eltinge, Rosita Marstini	Comedy	Paramount
The Clock	William Worthington	Franklyn Farnum, Agnes Vernon	Comedy	Universal
The Clodhopper	Victor Schertzinger	Charles Ray, Margery Wilson	Comedy	Triangle
The Cloud	Will S. Davis	Jean Sothern, Arthur Housman	Drama	Independent
Clover's Rebellion	Wilfrid North	Anita Stewart, Eulalie Jensen	Comedy	Vitagraph
The Cold Deck	William S. Hart	William S. Hart, Mildred Harris, Sylvia Breamer	Western	Triangle
Come Through	Jack Conway	Alice Lake, Herbert Rawlinson	Crime	Universal
The Conqueror	Raoul Walsh	William Farnum, Jewel Carmen, Charles Clary, James A. Marcus	Historical	Fox
Conscience	Bertram Bracken	Gladys Brockwell, Marjorie Daw	Drama	Fox
The Co-Respondent	Ralph Ince	Elaine Hammerstein, Wilfred Lucas	Drama	Universal
The Cook of Canyon Camp	Donald Crisp	Monroe Salisbury, Florence Vidor	Drama	Paramount
The Corner Grocer	George Cowl	Lew Fields, Madge Evans	Drama	World
The Cost of Hatred	George Melford	Kathlyn Williams, Theodore Roberts	Drama	Paramount
The Countess Charming	Donald Crisp	Julian Eltinge, Florence Vidor	Comedy	Paramount
The Courage of the Common Place	Ben Turbett	Leslie Austin, William Wadsworth	Drama	Edison
The Courage of Silence	William P.S. Earle	Alice Joyce, Harry T. Morey	Drama	Vitagraph
The Crab	Walter Edwards	Frank Keenan, Gertrude Claire	Drama	Triangle
The Cricket	Elsie Jane Wilson	Gretchen Lederer, Zoe Rae	Drama	Universal
Crime and Punishment	Lawrence B. McGill	Derwent Hall Caine, Lydia Knott	Crime	Pathé Exchange
The Crimson Dove	Romaine Fielding	Carlyle Blackwell, June Elvidge	Drama	World
A Crooked Romance	William Parke	Gladys Hulette, J.H. Gilmour	Drama	Pathé Exchange
The Crystal Gazer	George Melford	Fannie Ward, Winifred Greenwood	Drama	Paramount
The Curse of Eve	Frank Beal	Enid Markey, Edward Coxen	Drama	Independent
Cy Whittaker's Ward	Ben Turbett	William Wadsworth, Shirley Mason	Drama	Edison
The Dancer's Peril	Travers Vale	Alice Brady, Montagu Love	Romance	World
The Danger Trail	Frederick A. Thomson	H.B. Warner, Violet Heming, Lawson Butt	Adventure	Selig
The Dark Road	Charles Miller	Dorothy Dalton, Robert McKim, John Gilbert	Drama	Triangle
Darkest Russia	Travers Vale	Alice Brady, John Bowers	Drama	World
The Darling of Paris	J. Gordon Edwards	Theda Bara, Glen White	Romance	Fox
Daughter of Destiny	George Irving	Olga Petrova, Thomas Holding	Drama	Metro
Daughter of Maryland	John B. O'Brien	Edna Goodrich, William T. Carleton	Drama	Mutual
A Daughter of the Poor	Edward Dillon	Bessie Love, George Beranger	Drama	Triangle
The Dazzling Miss Davison	Frank Powell	Marjorie Rambeau, Agnes Ayres	Mystery	Mutual
Dead Shot Baker	William Duncan	Carol Holloway, Otto Lederer	Western	Vitagraph
The Debt	Frank Powell	Marjorie Rambeau, Agnes Ayres	Drama	Mutual
The Deemster	Howell Hansel	Derwent Hall Caine, Marian Swayne, Sidney Bracey	Drama	Independent
The Defeat of the City	Thomas R. Mills	J. Frank Glendon, Agnes Ayres	Drama	Vitagraph
The Derelict	Carl Harbaugh	Stuart Holmes, Wanda Hawley	Drama	Fox
The Desert Man	William S. Hart	William S. Hart, Margery Wilson	Western	Triangle
The Desire of the Moth	Rupert Julian	Ruth Clifford, Monroe Salisbury	Western	Universal
The Devil Dodger	Clifford Smith	Roy Stewart, John Gilbert	Western	Triangle
The Devil-Stone	Cecil B. DeMille	Geraldine Farrar, Wallace Reid	Romance	Paramount
The Devil's Assistant	Harry A. Pollard	Margarita Fischer, Monroe Salisbury	Drama	Mutual
The Devil's Pay Day	William Worthington	Franklyn Farnum, Leah Baird, Gertrude Astor	Drama	Universal
Diamonds and Pearls	George Archainbaud	Kitty Gordon, Milton Sills, George MacQuarrie	Drama	World
The Divorce Game	Travers Vale	Alice Brady, John Bowers, Arthur Ashley	Comedy	World
The Divorcee	William Wolbert	Mary Anderson, Gayne Whitman	Western	Vitagraph
A Doll's House	Joe De Grasse	Lon Chaney, Dorothy Phillips	Drama	Universal
The Door Between	Rupert Julian	Ruth Clifford, Monroe Salisbury	Drama	Universal
The Dormant Power	Travers Vale	Ethel Clayton, Montagu Love, Muriel Ostriche	Drama	World
Double Crossed	Robert G. Vignola	Pauline Frederick, Crauford Kent	Drama	Paramount
The Double Room Mystery	Hobart Henley	Hayward Mack, Ed Brady	Thriller	Universal
The Double Standard	Phillips Smalley	Roy Stewart, Clarissa Selwynne	Drama	Universal
Down to Earth	John Emerson	Douglas Fairbanks, Eileen Percy	Romantic comedy	Paramount
Draft 258	Christy Cabanne	Mabel Taliaferro, Walter Miller	Drama	Metro
The Dream Doll	Howard S. Moss	Marguerite Clayton, John Cossar, Rod La Rocque	Fantasy	Essanay
The Duchess of Doubt	George D. Baker	Emmy Wehlen, Ricca Allen	Comedy	Metro
The Dummy	Francis J. Grandon	Jack Pickford, Frank Losee	Drama	Paramount
The Duplicity of Hargraves	Thomas R. Mills	Charles Kent, J. Frank Glendon	Comedy	Vitagraph
Durand of the Bad Lands	Richard Stanton	Dustin Farnum, Tom Mix	Western	Fox

== E–F ==
Title	Director	Cast	Genre	Notes
Each to His Kind	Edward LeSaint	Sessue Hayakawa, Tsuru Aoki, Vola Vale	Drama	Paramount
The Easiest Way	Albert Capellani	Clara Kimball Young, Joseph Kilgour	Drama	Selznick
Easy Money	Travers Vale	Ethel Clayton, John Bowers	Drama	World Film
The Edge of the Law	Louis Chaudet	Ruth Stonehouse, Lloyd Whitlock	Crime	Universal
The Empress	Alice Guy	Doris Kenyon, Holbrook Blinn	Drama	Pathé Exchange
The End of the Tour	George D. Baker	Lionel Barrymore, Walter Hiers	Drama	Metro
Enlighten Thy Daughter	Ivan Abramson	Frank Sheridan, Zena Keefe, Marie Shotwell	Drama	Independent
Environment	James Kirkwood	Mary Miles Minter, George Fisher	Drama	Mutual
Envy	Richard Ridgely	Anna Murdock, Shirley Mason	Drama	Triangle
Eternal Love	Douglas Gerrard	Ruth Clifford, George Gebhart	Drama	Universal
The Eternal Mother	Frank Reicher	Ethel Barrymore, Frank R. Mills	Drama	Metro
The Eternal Sin	Herbert Brenon	Florence Reed, Richard Barthelmess	Historical	Selznick
The Eternal Temptress	Émile Chautard	Lina Cavalieri, Elliott Dexter	Drama	Paramount
Even As You and I	Lois Weber	Ben F. Wilson, Mignon Anderson, Bertram Grassby	Drama	Universal
An Even Break	Lambert Hillyer	Olive Thomas, Charles Gunn	Comedy	Triangle
Every Girl's Dream	Harry F. Millarde	June Caprice, Kittens Reichert	Drama	Fox
The Evil Eye	George Melford	Blanche Sweet, Tom Forman	Drama	Paramount
Exile	Maurice Tourneur	Olga Petrova, Wyndham Standing	Drama	Paramount
The Eye of Envy	Harrish Ingraham	Crane Wilbur, Frederick A. Thomson	Drama	Independent
The Eyes of the World	Donald Crisp	Monroe Salisbury, Jack Livingston, Jane Novak	Drama	Independent
The Fair Barbarian	Robert Thornby	Vivian Martin, Clarence Geldart	Comedy	Paramount
The Fall of the Romanoffs	Herbert Brenon	Alfred Hickman, Nance O'Neil, Conway Tearle	Drama	First National
The False Friend	Harry Davenport	Robert Warwick, Gail Kane	Drama	World
The Family Honor	Emile Chautard	Robert Warwick, June Elvidge, Henry Hull	Drama	World Film
Fanatics	Raymond Wells	Adda Gleason, J. Barney Sherry, William V. Mong	Drama	Triangle
Fear Not	Allen Holubar	Agnes Vernon, Murdock MacQuarrie	Crime	Universal
The Fettered Woman	Tom Terriss	Alice Joyce, Webster Campbell, Donald MacBride	Drama	Vitagraph
The Fibbers	Fred E. Wright	Bryant Washburn, Virginia Valli, John Cossar	Comedy	Essanay
The Field of Honor	Allen Holubar	Frank MacQuarrie, Louise Lovely	Drama	Universal
Fighting Back	Raymond Wells	William Desmond, Claire McDowell, Jack Richardson	Western	Triangle
Fighting for Love	Raymond Wells	Ruth Stonehouse, Jack Mulhall, Jean Hersholt	Drama	Universal
The Fighting Gringo	Fred Kelsey	Harry Carey, Claire Du Brey	Western	Universal
Fighting Mad	Edward LeSaint	William Stowell, Helen Gibson	Western	Universal
Fighting Odds	Allan Dwan	William T. Carleton, Maxine Elliott	Drama	Goldwyn
Filling His Own Shoes	Harry Beaumont	Bryant Washburn, Virginia Valli, Rod La Rocque	Comedy	Essanay
The Final Payment	Frank Powell	Nance O'Neil, Clifford Bruce	Drama	Fox
The Firefly of Tough Luck	E. Mason Hopper	Alma Rubens, Charles Gunn	Western	Triangle
Fires of Rebellion	Ida May Park	Lon Chaney, Dorothy Phillips	Drama	Universal
The Fires of Youth	Emile Chautard	Frederick Warde, Helen Badgley	Drama	Pathé Exchange
The Flame of Youth	Elmer Clifton	Jack Mulhall, Ann Forrest	Adventure	Universal
The Flame of the Yukon	Charles Miller	Dorothy Dalton, Melbourne MacDowell	Western	Triangle
The Flaming Omen	William Wolbert	Gayne Whitman, Otto Lederer	Drama	Vitagraph
The Flashlight	Ida May Park	Lon Chaney, Dorothy Phillips	Drama	Universal
Flirting with Death	Elmer Clifton	Herbert Rawlinson, Agnes Vernon	Comedy	Universal
The Flower of Doom	Rex Ingram	Wedgwood Nowell, Yvette Mitchell	Drama	Universal
Flying Colors	Frank Borzage	William Desmond, Jack Livingston	Drama	Triangle
Follow the Girl	Louis Chaudet	Ruth Stonehouse, Roy Stewart	Drama	Universal
The Food Gamblers	Albert Parker	Wilfred Lucas, Hedda Hopper	Drama	Triangle
Fools for Luck	Lawrence C. Windom	Taylor Holmes, Helen Ferguson	Comedy	Essanay
For France	Wesley Ruggles	Edward Earle, Mary Maurice	War	Vitagraph
For Liberty	Bertram Bracken	Gladys Brockwell, Bertram Grassby	War	Fox
For the Freedom of the World	Romaine Fielding	E.K. Lincoln, Barbara Castleton	War	Goldwyn
For Valour	Albert Parker	Winifred Allen, Richard Barthelmess	War drama	Triangle
Forbidden Paths	Robert Thornby	Vivian Martin, Sessue Hayakawa	Drama	Paramount
Forget Me Not	Emile Chautard	Kitty Gordon, Montagu Love	Drama	World
The Fortunes of Fifi	Robert G. Vignola	Marguerite Clark, Kate Lester	Romance	Paramount
The Frame-Up	Edward Sloman	William Russell, Francelia Billington	Comedy	Mutual
Framing Framers	Ferris Hartman	Charles Gunn, Edward Jobson	Comedy	Triangle
Freckles	Marshall Neilan	Jack Pickford, Louise Huff	Drama	Paramount
The Fringe of Society	Robert Ellis	Ruth Roland, Milton Sills, Leah Baird	Drama	Independent
The Frozen Warning	Oscar Eagle	Charlotte Hayward, Jack Meredith	Drama	Independent
The Fuel of Life	Walter Edwards	Belle Bennett, Tom Guise, Texas Guinan	Drama	Triangle

== G–H ==
Title	Director	Cast	Genre	Notes
A Game of Wits	Henry King	Gail Kane, Lew Cody, George Periolat	Comedy drama	Mutual
The Gates of Doom	Charles Swickard	Claire McDowell, Lee Shumway	Drama	Universal
The Gentle Intruder	James Kirkwood	Mary Miles Minter, George Fisher	Drama	Mutual
The Ghost House	William C. deMille	Jack Pickford, Louise Huff	Comedy	Paramount
The Ghost of Old Morro	Richard Ridgely	Herbert Prior, Robert Conness	Drama	Edison
The Gift Girl	Rupert Julian	Louise Lovely, Emory Johnson	Comedy	Universal
Gift o' Gab	W.S. Van Dyke	Helen Ferguson, John Cossar	Comedy	Essanay
The Gilded Youth	George L. Sargent	Richard Bennett, Rhea Mitchell	Comedy	Mutual
The Girl and the Crisis	William V. Mong	Dorothy Davenport, Alfred Hollingsworth	Drama	Universal
The Girl Angle	Edgar Jones	Anita King, Gordon Sackville	Western	Mutual
The Girl at Home	Marshall Neilan	Vivian Martin, Jack Pickford	Drama	Paramount
The Girl by the Roadside	Theodore Marston	Violet Mersereau, Ann Andrews	Mystery	Universal
The Girl, Glory	Roy William Neill	Enid Bennett, Walt Whitman	Drama	Triangle
The Girl in the Checkered Coat	Joe De Grasse	Lon Chaney, Dorothy Phillips	Drama	Universal
A Girl Like That	Dell Henderson	Irene Fenwick, Owen Moore	Drama	Paramount
A Girl of the Timber Claims	Paul Powell	Constance Talmadge, Allan Sears	Drama	Triangle
The Girl Who Couldn't Grow Up	Harry A. Pollard	Margarita Fischer, Jack Mower	Comedy	Mutual
The Girl Who Won Out	Eugene Moore	Violet MacMillan, Scott Pembroke	Drama	Universal
The Girl Without a Soul	John H. Collins	Viola Dana, Robert Walker	Drama	Metro
A Girl's Folly	Maurice Tourneur	Robert Warwick, Doris Kenyon, June Elvidge	Comedy	World
Giving Becky a Chance	Howard Estabrook	Vivian Martin, Jack Holt	Drama	Paramount
Glory	Francis J. Grandon, Burton L. King	Clarence Kolb, Juanita Hansen	Comedy	Independent
The Glory of Yolanda	Marguerite Bertsch	Anita Stewart, Denton Vane	Drama	Vitagraph
God of Little Children	Richard Ridgely	Alma Hanlon, Bigelow Cooper	Drama	Independent
God's Crucible	Lynn Reynolds	George Hernandez, Myrtle Gonzalez	Drama	Universal
God's Law and Man's	John H. Collins	Viola Dana, Robert Walker	Drama	Metro
God's Man	George Irving	H.B. Warner, Kate Lester, Albert Tavernier	Drama	Independent
The Golden Fetter	Edward LeSaint	Wallace Reid, Anita King	Romance	Paramount
The Golden Idiot	Arthur Berthelet	Bryant Washburn, Virginia Valli	Comedy	Essanay
Golden Rule Kate	Reginald Barker	Louise Glaum, William Conklin, John Gilbert	Western	Triangle
The Good for Nothing	Carlyle Blackwell	Carlyle Blackwell, Madge Evans, Evelyn Greeley	Drama	World
The Gown of Destiny	Lynn Reynolds	Alma Rubens, Allan Sears	Drama	Triangle
Grafters	Arthur Rosson	Anna Lehr, Frank Currier	Drama	Triangle
The Great Bradley Mystery	Richard Ridgely	Alma Hanlon, Edward Earle	Mystery	Independent
Great Expectations	Robert G. Vignola	Jack Pickford, Louise Huff	Drama	Paramount
The Great White Trail	Leopold Wharton	Doris Kenyon, Thomas Holding	Drama	Independent
The Greater Law	Lynn Reynolds	Myrtle Gonzalez, Gretchen Lederer	Drama	Universal
The Greater Woman	Frank Powell	Marjorie Rambeau, Aubrey Beattie	Drama	Mutual
The Greatest Power	Edwin Carewe, Edward LeSaint	Ethel Barrymore, William B. Davidson	Drama	Metro
Greed	Theodore Marston	Nance O'Neil, Shirley Mason	Drama	Triangle
The Grell Mystery	Paul Scardon	Earle Williams, Denton Vane	Mystery	Vitagraph
The Guardian	Arthur Ashley	Montagu Love, June Elvidge	Crime	World
The Gulf Between	Wray Physioc	Grace Darmond, Niles Welch	Comedy drama	Independent
The Gunfighter	William S. Hart	William S. Hart, Margery Wilson	Western	Triangle
The Hand That Rocks the Cradle	Phillips Smalley, Lois Weber	Phillips Smalley, Lois Weber	Drama	Universal
Hands Up!	Tod Browning	Wilfred Lucas, Colleen Moore	Western	Triangle
Happiness	Reginald Barker	Enid Bennett, Charles Gunn	Comedy	Triangle
Happiness of Three Women	William Desmond Taylor	House Peters, Sr., Myrtle Stedman	Drama	Paramount
Hashimura Togo	William C. deMille	Sessue Hayakawa, Florence Vidor	Comedy	Paramount
Hate	Walter Richard Stahl	May McAvoy, Jack McLean	Drama	Independent
The Hater of Men	Charles Miller	Bessie Barriscale, John Gilbert	Drama	Triangle
The Haunted House	Albert Parker	Winifred Allen, Richard Rosson	Mystery	Triangle
The Haunted Pajamas	Fred J. Balshofer	Harold Lockwood, Carmel Myers	Comedy	Metro
The Hawk	Paul Scardon	Earle Williams, Ethel Grey Terry	Drama	Vitagraph
Heart and Soul	J. Gordon Edwards	Theda Bara, Claire Whitney	Drama	Fox
The Heart of a Lion	Frank Lloyd	William Farnum, Wanda Hawley, Walter Law	Drama	Fox
The Heart of Ezra Greer	Emile Chautard	Frederick Warde, Thomas A. Curran	Drama	Pathe Exchange
The Heart of Texas Ryan	E. A. Martin	Tom Mix, Bessie Eyton	Western	Selig
Heart Strings	Allen Holubar	Allen Holubar, Francelia Billington, Maude George	Drama	Universal
Heart's Desire	Francis J. Grandon	Marie Doro, Alan Roscoe	Drama	Paramount
Hedda Gabler	Frank Powell	Nance O'Neil, Alfred Hickman	Drama	Mutual
The Heir of the Ages	Edward LeSaint	House Peters, Sr., Eugene Pallette	Drama	Paramount
Hell Morgan's Girl	Joe De Grasse	Dorothy Phillips, Lon Chaney	Drama	Universal
Her Beloved Enemy	Ernest C. Warde	J.H. Gilmour, Gladys Leslie	Mystery	Pathé Exchange
Her Better Self	Robert G. Vignola	Pauline Frederick, Thomas Meighan	Drama	Paramount
Her Country's Call	Lloyd Ingraham	Mary Miles Minter, George Periolat	Drama	Mutual
Her Excellency, the Governor	Albert Parker	Wilfred Lucas, Hedda Hopper	Drama	Triangle
Her Father's Keeper	Arthur Rosson	Irene Howley, Frank Currier	Drama	Triangle
Her Fighting Chance	Edwin Carewe	Jane Grey, Thomas Holding	Drama	Independent
Her Good Name	George Terwilliger	Jean Sothern, Arthur Housman	Drama	Independent
Her Greatest Love	J. Gordon Edwards	Theda Bara, Walter Law	Drama	Fox
Her Hour	George Cowl	Kitty Gordon, George MacQuarrie	Drama	World
Her Life and His	Frederic Richard Sullivan	Florence La Badie, Holmes Herbert, Ethyle Cooke	Drama	Pathé Exchange
Her New York	Eugene Moore, O.A.C. Lund	Gladys Hulette, Riley Chamberlin	Drama	Pathé Exchange
Her Official Fathers	Elmer Clifton, Joseph Henabery	Dorothy Gish, Frank Bennett	Comedy	Triangle
Her Own People	Scott Sidney	Lenore Ulric, Colin Chase	Drama	Paramount
Her Right to Live	Paul Scardon	Peggy Hyland, Antonio Moreno	Drama	Vitagraph
Her Second Husband	Dell Henderson	Edna Goodrich, William B. Davidson	Drama	Mutual
Her Secret	Perry N. Vekroff	Alice Joyce, Harry T. Morey	Drama	Vitagraph
Her Silent Sacrifice	Edward Jose	Alice Brady, Henry Clive	Drama	Selznick
Her Sister	John B. O'Brien	Olive Tell, David Powell	Drama	Mutual
Her Soul's Inspiration	Jack Conway	Ella Hall, Edward Hearn	Drama	Universal
Her Strange Wedding	George Melford	Fannie Ward, Tom Forman	Drama	Paramount
Her Temptation	Richard Stanton	Gladys Brockwell, Bertram Grassby	Drama	Fox
The Hero of the Hour	Raymond Wells	Jack Mulhall, Fritzi Ridgeway	Western	Universal
The Hidden Children	Oscar Apfel	Harold Lockwood, May Allison, Lillian West	Historical	Metro
The Hidden Spring	E. Mason Hopper	Harold Lockwood, Vera Sisson, Herbert Standing	Drama	Metro
High Finance	Otis Turner	George Walsh, Doris Pawn	Drama	Fox
High Play	Edward Sloman	William Russell, Francelia Billington	Drama	Mutual
The High Sign	Elmer Clifton	Herbert Rawlinson, Agnes Vernon	Drama	Universal
High Speed	Elmer Clifton	Jack Mulhall, Fritzi Ridgeway	Comedy	Universal
The Highway of Hope	Howard Estabrook	House Peters, Sr., Kathlyn Williams	Western	Paramount
Hinton's Double	Ernest C. Warde	Frederick Warde, Kathryn Adams	Drama	Pathe Exchange
His Father's Son	George D. Baker	Lionel Barrymore, Frank Currier	Drama	Metro
His Mother's Boy	Victor Schertzinger	Charles Ray, Doris May	Drama	Paramount
His Own People	William P. S. Earle	Harry T. Morey, Gladys Leslie	Drama	Vitagraph
His Sweetheart	Donald Crisp	George Beban, Helen Jerome Eddy	Drama	Paramount
The Honeymoon	Charles Giblyn	Constance Talmadge, Earle Foxe	Comedy	Selznick
The Honor System	Raoul Walsh	Milton Sills, Miriam Cooper, James Marcus	Drama	Fox
The Hostage	Robert Thornby	Wallace Reid, Gertrude Short	Drama	Paramount
House of Cards	Alice Guy-Blaché	Catherine Calvert, Frank Mills	Drama	Independent
A Hungry Heart	Emile Chautard	Alice Brady, Edward Langford	Drama	World
The Hungry Heart	Robert G. Vignola	Pauline Frederick, Helen Lindroth	Drama	Paramount
The Hunting of the Hawk	George Fitzmaurice	William Courtenay, Marguerite Snow	Mystery	Pathe Exchange

== I–J ==
Title	Director	Cast	Genre	Notes
I Will Repay	William P. S. Earle	Corinne Griffith, Eulalie Jensen	Drama	Vitagraph
The Iced Bullet	Reginald Barker	William Desmond, Robert McKim, J. Barney Sherry	Mystery	Triangle
Idolators	Walter Edwards	Louise Glaum, Tom Guise, Dorcas Matthews	Drama	Triangle
The Image Maker	Eugene Moore	Valda Valkyrien, Morgan Jones	Drama	Pathé Exchange
In Again, Out Again	John Emerson	Douglas Fairbanks, Walter Walker, Arnold Lucy	Comedy	Paramount
In Slumberland	Irvin Willat	Thelma Salter, Jack Livingston	Drama	Triangle
In the Balance	Paul Scardon	Earle Williams, Grace Darmond	Drama	Vitagraph
Indiscreet Corinne	John Francis Dillon	Olive Thomas, George Chesebro	Comedy	Triangle
Indiscretion	Wilfrid North	Lillian Walker, Walter McGrail	Drama	Vitagraph
The Inevitable	Ben Goetz	Anna Q. Nilsson, Chester Barnett	Drama	Independent
Infidelity	Ashley Miller	Anna Q. Nilsson, Miriam Nesbitt	Drama	Independent
The Inner Shrine	Frank Reicher	Margaret Illington, Jack Holt	Drama	Paramount
The Innocent Sinner	Raoul Walsh	Miriam Cooper, Jack Standing, Jane Novak	Drama	Fox Film
The Inspirations of Harry Larrabee	Bertram Bracken	Clifford Grey, Margaret Landis	Mystery	General
Intrigue	John S. Robertson	Peggy Hyland, Marc McDermott	Drama	Vitagraph
The Iron Heart	George Fitzmaurice	Edwin Arden, Helene Chadwick	Drama	Pathe Exchange
The Iron Ring	George Archainbaud	Edward Langford, Gerda Holmes, Arthur Ashley	Drama	World
The Island of Desire	Otis Turner	George Walsh, Anna Luther	Adventure	Fox
It Happened to Adele	Van Dyke Brooke	Gladys Leslie, Clarine Seymour	Drama	Pathé Exchange
Jack and Jill	William Desmond Taylor	Jack Pickford, Louise Huff	Western	Paramount
Jack and the Beanstalk	Sidney Franklin, Chester Franklin	Francis Carpenter, Virginia Lee Corbin	Fantasy	Fox Film
The Jaguar's Claws	Marshall Neilan	Sessue Hayakawa, Fritzi Brunette	Western	Paramount
A Jewel in Pawn	Jack Conway	Ella Hall, Antrim Short	Drama	Universal
Jim Bludso	Tod Browning	Wilfred Lucas, Olga Grey	Drama	Triangle
John Ermine of the Yellowstone	Francis Ford	Francis Ford, Mark Fenton, Duke Worne	Western	Universal
The Judgment House	J. Stuart Blackton	Violet Heming, Wilfred Lucas, Conway Tearle	Drama	Paramount
The Jury of Fate	Tod Browning	Mabel Taliaferro, Bradley Barker	Drama	Metro

== K–L ==
Title	Director	Cast	Genre	Notes
A Kentucky Cinderella	Rupert Julian	Ruth Clifford, Harry Carter (actor)	Drama	Universal
Kick In	George Fitzmaurice	William Courtenay, Mollie King	Drama	Pathe Exchange
Kidnapped	Alan Crosland	Raymond McKee, William Wadsworth	Adventure	Edison
The Kill-Joy	Fred E. Wright	Mary McAllister, Granville Bates	Comedy	Essanay
The Kingdom of Love	Frank Lloyd	Jewel Carmen, Nancy Caswell	Drama	Fox
A Kiss for Susie	Robert Thornby	Vivian Martin, Tom Forman	Comedy	Paramount
Kitty MacKay	Wilfrid North	Lillian Walker, Charles Kent	Comedy drama	Vitagraph
The Lad and the Lion	Alfred E. Green	Vivian Reed, Will Machin	Adventure	Selig
Lady Barnacle	John H. Collins	Viola Dana, Robert D. Walker	Comedy	Metro
The Lady in the Library	Edgar Jones	Vola Vale, Barney Furey	Drama	General
The Lady of the Photograph	Ben Turbett	Shirley Mason, Raymond McKee, Gerald Pring	Comedy	Edison
The Lair of the Wolf	Charles Swickard	Gretchen Lederer, Joseph W. Girard	Drama	Universal
The Land of Promise	Joseph Kaufman	Billie Burke, Thomas Meighan	Comedy	Paramount
The Land of Long Shadows	W. S. Van Dyke	Jack Gardner, Ruth King, Carl Stockdale	Western	Essanay
The Lash of Power	Harry Solter	Kenneth Harlan, Carmel Myers	Drama	Universal
The Last of the Carnabys	William Parke	Gladys Hulette, J.H. Gilmour, Helene Chadwick	Drama	Pathé Exchange
The Last of the Ingrams	Walter Edwards	William Desmond, Margery Wilson, Robert McKim	Drama	Triangle
The Law of Compensation	Joseph A. Golden	Norma Talmadge, Fred Esmelton, Chester Barnett	Drama	Selznick
The Law of the Land	Maurice Tourneur	Olga Petrova, Wyndham Standing	Drama	Paramount
The Law of the North	Burton George, Edward H. Griffith	Shirley Mason, Pat O'Malley	Adventure	Edison
The Last Sentence	Ben Turbett	Marc McDermott, Miriam Nesbitt	Drama	Edison
The Learning of Jim Benton	Clifford Smith	Roy Stewart, Fritzi Ridgeway	Western	Triangle
Les Misérables	Frank Lloyd	William Farnum, Hardee Kirkland, Gretchen Hartman	Historical	Fox
The Lesson	Charles Giblyn	Constance Talmadge, Tom Moore	Comedy	Selznick
Life's Whirlpool	Lionel Barrymore	Ethel Barrymore, Alan Hale	Drama	Metro
The Lifted Veil	George D. Baker	Ethel Barrymore, William B. Davidson	Drama	Metro
The Light in Darkness	Alan Crosland	Shirley Mason, Frank Morgan	Drama	Edison
Like Wildfire	Stuart Paton	Herbert Rawlinson, Neva Gerber	Comedy drama	Universal
The Lincoln Cycle	John M. Stahl	Walter Blakeley, Harry Fischbeck	Historical	Paramount
The Little American	Cecil B. DeMille	Mary Pickford, Jack Holt, Raymond Hatton	War drama	Paramount
The Little Boy Scout	Francis J. Grandon	Ann Pennington, Owen Moore	Drama	Paramount
The Little Brother	Charles Miller	William Garwood, Enid Bennett	Drama	Triangle
The Little Chevalier	Alan Crosland	Shirley Mason, Raymond McKee	Historical	Edison
The Little Duchess	Harley Knoles	Madge Evans, Pinna Nesbit	Drama	World
Little Lost Sister	Alfred E. Green	Vivian Reed, George Fawcett	Drama	Selig
Little Miss Fortune	Joseph Levering	Marian Swayne, Hugh Thompson	Drama	Independent
Little Miss Optimist	Robert Thornby	Vivian Martin, Tom Moore	Drama	Paramount
The Little Orphan	Jack Conway	Ella Hall, Gertrude Astor, Gretchen Lederer	Drama	Universal
The Little Patriot	William Bertram	Marie Osborne, Herbert Standing	Drama	Pathé Exchange
The Little Pirate	Elsie Jane Wilson	Zoe Rae, Charles West	Adventure	Universal
The Little Princess	Marshall Neilan	Mary Pickford, Norman Kerry, ZaSu Pitts	Drama	Paramount
The Little Samaritan	Joseph Levering	Marian Swayne, Carl Gerard	Drama	Independent
The Little Shoes	Arthur Berthelet	Henry B. Walthall, Mary Charleson	Drama	Essanay
The Little Terror	Rex Ingram	Violet Mersereau, Sidney Mason	Drama	Universal
The Little Yank	George Siegmann	Dorothy Gish, Frank Bennett	Historical	Triangle
The Lone Wolf	Herbert Brenon	Bert Lytell, Hazel Dawn	Drama	Selznick
The Lonesome Chap	Edward LeSaint	Louise Huff, Eugene Pallette	Drama	Paramount
The Long Trail	Howell Hansel	Lou Tellegen, Mary Fuller	Western	Paramount
Lorelei of the Sea	Henry Otto	Tyrone Power Sr., Jay Belasco	Drama	Independent
Lost and Won	Cecil B. DeMille	Marie Doro, Elliott Dexter	Drama	Paramount
Lost in Transit	Donald Crisp	George Beban, Helen Jerome Eddy	Drama	Paramount
Love Aflame	James Vincent, Raymond Wells	Ruth Stonehouse, Stuart Holmes, Jack Mulhall	Comedy	Universal
The Love Doctor	Paul Scardon	Earle Williams, Corinne Griffith	Drama	Vitagraph
Love Letters	Roy William Neill	Dorothy Dalton, William Conklin	Drama	Paramount
Love or Justice	Walter Edwards	Louise Glaum, Charles Gunn, Jack Richardson	Drama	Triangle
A Love Sublime	Tod Browning	Wilfred Lucas, Carmel Myers	Romance	Triangle
The Love That Lives	Robert G. Vignola	Pauline Frederick, John St. Polis	Drama	Paramount
Love's Law	Tefft Johnson	Joan Sawyer, Stuart Holmes, Olga Grey	Drama	Fox
Loyalty	Jack Pratt	Betty Brice, Jay Morley	Drama	Independent

== M–N ==
Title	Director	Cast	Genre	Notes
The Mad Lover	Léonce Perret	Robert Warwick, Elaine Hammerstein	Drama	Pathé Exchange
Madame Bo-Peep	Chester Withey	Seena Owen, Allan Sears	Comedy	Triangle
Madame Du Barry	J. Gordon Edwards	Theda Bara, Charles Clary, Herschel Mayall	Historical	Fox
Madame Sherry	Ralph Dean	Gertrude McCoy, Frank O'Connor, Jean Stuart	Comedy	Independent
Madcap Madge	Raymond B. West	Olive Thomas, Charles Gunn	Comedy	Triangle
The Maelstrom	Paul Scardon	Dorothy Kelly, Earle Williams	Drama	Vitagraph
Magda	Emile Chautard	Clara Kimball Young, Alice Gale, Valda Valkyrien	Drama	Selznick
A Magdalene of the Hills	John W. Noble	Mabel Taliaferro, William Garwood	Drama	Metro
The Magnificent Meddler	William Wolbert	Antonio Moreno, Otto Lederer	Comedy	Vitagraph
A Maid of Belgium	George Archainbaud	Alice Brady, George MacQuarrie	Drama	World
Man and Beast	Henry MacRae	Harry Clifton, Eileen Sedgwick	Adventure	Universal
A Man and the Woman	Herbert Blaché, Alice Guy	Edith Hallor, Leslie Austin	Drama	Independent
The Man from Montana	George Marshall	Neal Hart, George Berrell	Drama	Universal
The Man from Painted Post	Joseph Henabery	Douglas Fairbanks, Eileen Percy, Frank Campeau	Western	Paramount
The Man Hater	Albert Parker	Winifred Allen, Ann Dvorak	Comedy	Triangle
The Man of Mystery	Frederick A. Thomson	E.H. Sothern, Brinsley Shaw	Drama	Vitagraph
The Man Trap	Elmer Clifton	Herbert Rawlinson, Ruby Lafayette	Crime	Universal
The Man Who Forgot	Emile Chautard	Robert Warwick, Doris Kenyon	Drama	World
The Man Who Made Good	Arthur Rosson	Jack Devereaux, Winifred Allen	Comedy	Triangle
The Man Who Took a Chance	William Worthington	Franklyn Farnum, Agnes Vernon	Comedy	Universal
The Man Who Was Afraid	Fred E. Wright	Bryant Washburn, Ernest Maupain	War drama	Essanay
The Man Without a Country	Ernest C. Warde	Florence La Badie, Holmes Herbert	Drama	Universal
A Man's Law	Harry Davenport	Ruth Cummings, Irving Cummings	Drama	Independent
A Man's Man	Oscar Apfel	J. Warren Kerrigan, Lois Wilson, Kenneth Harlan	Adventure	Hodkinson
Man's Woman	Travers Vale	Ethel Clayton, Rockliffe Fellowes, Edward Kimball	Drama	World
The Marcellini Millions	Donald Crisp	George Beban, Helen Jerome Eddy	Drama	Paramount
The Mark of Cain	George Fitzmaurice	Antonio Moreno, Irene Castle, J.H. Gilmour	Mystery	Pathé Exchange
A Marked Man	John Ford	Harry Carey, Molly Malone	Western	Universal
The Marriage Market	Arthur Ashley	Carlyle Blackwell, June Elvidge	Drama	World Film
The Marriage Speculation	Ashley Miller	Charles Kent, Wallace MacDonald	Comedy	Vitagraph
Married in Name Only	Edmund Lawrence	Gretchen Hartman, Milton Sills, Marie Shotwell	Drama	Independent
The Martinache Marriage	Bertram Bracken	Margaret Landis, Philo McCullough	Drama	General
Mary Jane's Pa	Charles Brabin, William P.S. Earle	Marc McDermott, Eulalie Jensen	Drama	Vitagraph
Mary Lawson's Secret	John B. O'Brien	Charlotte Walker, William B. Davidson	Drama	Pathe Exchange
Mary Moreland	Frank Powell	Marjorie Rambeau, Robert Elliott	Drama	Mutual
The Masked Heart	Edward Sloman	William Russell, Francelia Billington	Drama	Mutual
Master of His Home	Walter Edwards	William Desmond, Alma Rubens	Drama	Triangle
The Master Passion	Richard Ridgely	Mabel Trunnelle, Robert Conness	Drama	Edison
The Mate of the Sally Ann	Henry King	Mary Miles Minter, Allan Forrest	Comedy drama	Mutual Film
The Maternal Spark	Gilbert P. Hamilton	Irene Hunt, Rowland V. Lee	Drama	Triangle
Maternity	John B. O'Brien	Alice Brady, John Bowers	Drama	World
Mayblossom	Edward José	Pearl White, Fuller Mellish	Drama	Pathe Exchange
The Medicine Man	Clifford Smith	Roy Stewart, Ann Forrest	Western	Triangle
Melissa of the Hills	James Kirkwood	Mary Miles Minter, Spottiswoode Aitken	Drama	Mutual
Melting Millions	Otis Turner	Sydney Deane, George Walsh	Comedy	Fox
Men of the Desert	W.S. Van Dyke	Ruth King, Carl Stockdale	Western	Essanay
Mentioned in Confidence	Edgar Jones	Vola Vale, Frank Brownlee	Drama	General
The Message of the Mouse	J. Stuart Blackton	Anita Stewart, Julia Swayne Gordon	Drama	Vitagraph
The Midnight Man	Elmer Clifton	Jack Mulhall, Ann Forrest	Crime	Universal
Might and the Man	Edward Dillon	Elmo Lincoln, Carmel Myers, Wilbur Higby	Drama	Triangle
The Millionaire Vagrant	Victor Schertzinger	Charles Ray, Sylvia Breamer, John Gilbert	Drama	Triangle
The Millionaire's Double	Harry Davenport	Lionel Barrymore, Evelyn Brent	Drama	Metro
The Mirror	Frank Powell	Robert Elliott, Marjorie Rambeau	Drama	Mutual
Miss Jackie of the Army	Lloyd Ingraham	Margarita Fischer, Jack Mower	War	Mutual
Miss Nobody	William Parke	Gladys Hulette, Cesare Gravina	Drama	Pathe Exchange
Miss Robinson Crusoe	Christy Cabanne	Emmy Wehlen, Harold Entwistle	Comedy	Metro
Miss U.S.A.	Harry F. Millarde	June Caprice, William Courtleigh Jr.	Drama	Fox
A Modern Cinderella	John G. Adolfi	June Caprice, Frank Morgan	Drama	Fox
A Modern Monte Cristo	Eugene Moore	Vincent Serrano, Helen Badgley, Thomas A. Curran	Drama	Pathé Exchange
A Modern Musketeer	Allan Dwan	Douglas Fairbanks, Marjorie Daw	Adventure	Paramount
Molly Entangled	Robert Thornby	Vivian Martin, Harrison Ford	Drama	Paramount
Money Madness	Henry MacRae	Charles Hill Mailes, Eddie Polo	Crime	Universal
Money Magic	William Wolbert	Antonio Moreno, Edith Storey	Drama	Vitagraph
The Money Mill	John S. Robertson	Dorothy Kelly, Edward Elkas, Charles Kent	Drama	Vitagraph
The Moral Code	Ashley Miller	Anna Q. Nilsson, Walter Hitchcock	Drama	Independent
Moral Courage	Romaine Fielding	Muriel Ostriche, Arthur Ashley	Drama	World
The More Excellent Way	Perry N. Vekroff	Anita Stewart, Charles Richman	Drama	Vitagraph
More Truth Than Poetry	Burton King	Olga Petrova, Mahlon Hamilton	Drama	Metro
A Mormon Maid	Robert Z. Leonard	Mae Murray, Frank Borzage	Drama	Paramount
The Mortal Sin	John H. Collins	Viola Dana, Robert D. Walker	Drama	Metro
The Moth	Edward José	Norma Talmadge, Eugene O'Brien	Drama	Selznick
The Mother Instinct	Lambert Hillyer, Roy William Neill	Enid Bennett, Rowland V. Lee, John Gilbert	Drama	Triangle
Mother O' Mine	Rupert Julian	Ruth Clifford, Elsie Jane Wilson	Drama	Universal
Motherhood	Frank Powell	Marjorie Rambeau, Robert Elliott	Drama	Mutual
Mothers of Men	Willis Robards	Dorothy Davenport, Katherine Griffith	Drama	Independent
A Mother's Ordeal	Will S. Davis	Jean Sothern, Arthur Housman	Drama	Independent
Mountain Dew	Thomas N. Heffron	Margery Wilson, Charles Gunn	Drama	Triangle
Mr. Dolan of New York	Raymond Wells	Jack Mulhall, Noble Johnson	Drama	Universal
Mr. Opp	Lynn Reynolds	Arthur Hoyt, George Chesebro	Drama	Universal
Mrs. Balfame	Frank Powell	Nance O'Neil, Robert Elliott, Agnes Ayres	Mystery	Mutual
Mutiny	Lynn Reynolds	Myrtle Gonzalez, Jack Curtis	Drama	Universal
My Fighting Gentleman	Edward Sloman	William Russell, Francelia Billington	Historical	Mutual
My Little Boy	Elsie Jane Wilson	Zoe Rae, Ella Hall	Drama	Universal
The Mysterious Miss Terry	J. Searle Dawley	Billie Burke, Thomas Meighan	Drama	Paramount
The Mysterious Mr. Tiller	Rupert Julian	Ruth Clifford, Rupert Julian	Mystery	Universal
The Mysterious Mrs. M	Lois Weber	Harrison Ford, Mary MacLaren	Drama	Universal
The Mystery of No. 47	Otis B. Thayer	Ralph C. Herz, Casson Ferguson	Comedy	Selig
The Mystic Hour	Richard Ridgely	Alma Hanlon, Charles Hutchison	Mystery	Independent
Nan of Music Mountain	George Melford	Wallace Reid, Ann Little	Drama	Paramount
The Narrow Trail	Lambert Hillyer	William S. Hart, Sylvia Breamer, Milton Ross	Western	Paramount
The Natural Law	Charles H. France	Marguerite Courtot, George Larkin	Drama	Independent
Nearly Married	Chester Withey	Madge Kennedy, Richard Barthelmess, Hedda Hopper	Comedy	Goldwyn
New York Luck	Edward Sloman	William Russell, Francelia Billington	Drama	Mutual
The New York Peacock	Kenean Buel	Valeska Suratt, Harry Hilliard	Crime	Fox
A Night in New Arabia	Thomas R. Mills	J. Frank Glendon, Patsy De Forest	Drama	Vitagraph
The Night Workers	J. Charles Haydon	Marguerite Clayton, Mabel Bardine	Drama	Essanay
Nina, the Flower Girl	D. W. Griffith	Bessie Love, Elmer Clifton, Bert Hadley	Drama	Triangle
North of Fifty-Three	William Desmond Taylor	Dustin Farnum, Winifred Kingston	Drama	Fox

== O–P ==
Title	Director	Cast	Genre	Notes
An Old-Fashioned Young Man	Lloyd Ingraham	Robert Harron, Thomas Jefferson	Drama	Triangle
On Dangerous Ground	Robert Thornby	Carlyle Blackwell, Gail Kane	Drama	World
On Record	Robert Z. Leonard	Mae Murray, Tom Forman	Crime drama	Paramount
On the Level	George Melford	Fannie Ward, Harrison Ford	Western	Paramount
The On-the-Square Girl	George Fitzmaurice	Mollie King, L. Rogers Lytton, Aimee Dalmores	Drama	Pathé Exchange
On Trial	James Young	Barbara Castleton, Sidney Ainsworth, Mary McAllister	Drama	First National
One Hour	Paul McAllister	Zena Keefe, Alan Hale	Drama	Independent
One Law for Both	Ivan Abramson	Rita Jolivet, James W. Morrison, Leah Baird	Drama	Independent
One of Many	Christy Cabanne	Frances Nelson, Niles Welch	Drama	Metro
One Shot Ross	Clifford Smith	Roy Stewart, Josie Sedgwick, Jack Richardson	Western	Triangle
One Touch of Nature	Edward H. Griffith	John Drew Bennett, John McGraw	Comedy	Edison
One Touch of Sin	Richard Stanton	Gladys Brockwell, Jack Standing, Willard Louis	Drama	Fox
Open Places	W.S. Van Dyke	Carl Stockdale, Ruth King	Western	Essanay
Out of the Wreck	William Desmond Taylor	Kathlyn Williams, William Clifford	Drama	Paramount
Outcast	Dell Henderson	Ann Murdock, David Powell, Catherine Calvert	Drama	Mutual
The Outsider	William C. Dowlan	Emmy Wehlen, Herbert Heyes	Drama	Metro
Outwitted	George D. Baker	Emily Stevens, Earle Foxe	Drama	Metro
Over the Hill	William Parke	Gladys Hulette, Dan Mason	Drama	Pathé Exchange
Over There	James Kirkwood Sr.	Charles Richman, Anna Q. Nilsson, Walter McGrail	War	Selznick
Paddy O'Hara	Walter Edwards	William Desmond, Mary McIvor, Robert McKim	Adventure	Triangle
The Page Mystery	Harley Knoles	Carlyle Blackwell, June Elvidge, Arthur Ashley	Mystery	World
The Painted Madonna	O.A.C. Lund	Gretchen Hartman, Sidney Mason	Drama	Fox
Panthea	Allan Dwan	Norma Talmadge, Earle Foxe	Drama	Selznick
Pants	Arthur Berthelet	Mary McAllister, John Cossar	Comedy	Essanay
Paradise Garden	Fred J. Balshofer	Harold Lockwood, Vera Sisson	Comedy	Metro
Passion	Richard Ridgely	Shirley Mason, Clifford Bruce	Drama	Triangle
Patsy	John G. Adolfi	June Caprice, Harry Hilliard	Comedy	Fox
Paws of the Bear	Reginald Barker	William Desmond, Clara Williams, Robert McKim	War drama	Triangle
Pay Me!	Joe De Grasse	Lon Chaney, Dorothy Phillips, Claire Du Brey	Drama	Universal
The Peddler	Herbert Blaché	Sidney Mason, Catherine Calvert	Drama	Independent
Peggy Leads the Way	Lloyd Ingraham	Mary Miles Minter, Carl Stockdale	Drama	Mutual
Peggy, the Will O' the Wisp	Tod Browning	Mabel Taliaferro, Clara Blandick	Drama	Metro
The Penny Philanthropist	Guy McConnell	Ralph Morgan, Peggy O'Neil	Drama	Independent
Periwinkle	James Kirkwood	Mary Miles Minter, George Fisher	Drama	Mutual
Persuasive Peggy	Charles Brabin	Peggy Hyland, William B. Davidson	Comedy	Independent
A Phantom Husband	Ferris Hartman	Ruth Stonehouse, Charles Gunn	Comedy drama	Triangle
The Phantom's Secret	Charles Swickard	Hayward Mack, Mignon Anderson	Mystery	Universal
The Pinch Hitter	Victor Schertzinger	Charles Ray, Sylvia Breamer	Comedy	Triangle
The Piper's Price	Joe De Grasse	Dorothy Phillips, Lon Chaney	Drama	Universal
The Planter	Thomas N. Heffron, John Ince	Tyrone Power Sr., Lamar Johnstone	Drama	Mutual
Please Help Emily	Dell Henderson	Ann Murdock, Amy Veness	Comedy	Mutual
The Plow Woman	Charles Swickard	Mary MacLaren, Lee Shumway, Kingsley Benedict	Drama	Universal
Polly Ann	Charles Miller	Bessie Love, Rowland V. Lee, Darrell Foss	Comedy	Triangle
Polly of the Circus	Edwin L. Hollywood	Mae Marsh, Vernon Steele, Charles Eldridge	Drama	Goldwyn
Polly Put the Kettle On	Douglas Gerrard	Thomas Jefferson, Ruth Clifford	Drama	Universal
Polly Redhead	Jack Conway	Ella Hall, Gertrude Astor, Charles Hill Mailes	Comedy	Universal
The Poor Little Rich Girl	Maurice Tourneur	Mary Pickford, Madlaine Traverse, Charles Wellesley	Drama	Paramount
Poppy	Edward José	Norma Talmadge, Eugene O'Brien	Drama	Selznick
Pots-and-Pans Peggy	Eugene Moore	Gladys Hulette, Kathryn Adams	Comedy	Pathe Exchange
The Power of Decision	John W. Noble	Frances Nelson, Richard Tucker, John Davidson	Drama	Metro
The Price Mark	Roy William Neill	Dorothy Dalton, William Conklin	Drama	Paramount
The Price of a Good Time	Lois Weber, Phillips Smalley	Mildred Harris, Helene Rosson, Kenneth Harlan	Drama	Universal
The Price of Her Soul	Oscar Apfel	Gladys Brockwell, Monroe Salisbury	Drama	Independent
The Price of Pride	Harley Knoles	Carlyle Blackwell, June Elvidge	Western drama	World
The Price of Silence	Frank Lloyd	William Farnum, Vivian Rich	Drama	Fox
The Price She Paid	Charles Giblyn	Clara Kimball Young, Louise Beaudet, Alan Hale	Drama	Selznick
Pride	Richard Ridgely	Holbrook Blinn, Shirley Mason	Drama	Triangle
Pride and the Devil	Richard Ridgely	Alma Hanlon, Bigelow Cooper	Drama	Independent
Pride and the Man	Edward Sloman	William Russell, Francelia Billington	Drama	Mutual
The Pride of the Clan	Maurice Tourneur	Mary Pickford, Matt Moore, Warren Cook	Romance	Paramount
The Pride of New York	Raoul Walsh	George Walsh, James A. Marcus	War drama	Fox
The Primitive Call	Bertram Bracken	Gladys Coburn, Fritz Leiber	Drama	Fox
The Primrose Ring	Robert Z. Leonard	Mae Murray, Tom Moore	Drama	Paramount
Princess of the Dark	Charles Miller	Enid Bennett, John Gilbert, Gayne Whitman	Drama	Triangle
The Princess of Park Row	Ashley Miller	Wallace MacDonald, Ann Brody	Comedy	Vitagraph
The Princess of Patches	Alfred E. Green	Vivian Reed, Charles Le Moyne	Drama	Selig
Princess Virtue	Robert Z. Leonard	Mae Marsh, Wheeler Oakman	Drama	Universal
The Prison Without Walls	E. Mason Hopper	Wallace Reid, Myrtle Stedman	Drama	Paramount
The Promise	Jay Hunt	Harold Lockwood, May Allison, Lester Cuneo	Drama	Metro
Public Be Damned	Stanner E.V. Taylor	Mary Fuller, Charles Richman	Drama	Selznick
Public Defender	Burton L. King	Frank Keenan, Alma Hanlon	Drama	Independent
The Pulse of Life	Rex Ingram	Wedgwood Nowell, Molly Malone	Drama	Universal

== Q–R ==
Title	Director	Cast	Genre	Notes
Queen X	John B. O'Brien	Edna Goodrich, Hugh Thompson	Crime	Mutual
The Question	Perry N. Vekroff	Harry T. Morey, Alice Joyce	Drama	Vitagraph
Raffles, the Amateur Cracksman	George Irving	John Barrymore, Evelyn Brent, Frank Morgan	Adventure	Independent
The Raggedy Queen	Theodore Marston	Violet Mersereau, James O'Neill	Drama	Universal
The Rainbow	Ralph Dean	Dorothy Bernard, Robert Conness	Drama	Independent
The Rainbow Girl	Rollin S. Sturgeon	George Fisher, Charles Bennett	Drama	Mutual
The Rainbow ring	Evelyn Brent	Evelyn Brent, Betsy Ross	Drama	World
The Range Boss	W. S. Van Dyke	Ruth King, Carl Stockdale	Western	Essanay
Rasputin, the Black Monk	Arthur Ashley	Montagu Love, June Elvidge, Henry Hull	Biopic	World
Reaching for the Moon	John Emerson	Douglas Fairbanks, Eileen Percy	Adventure	Paramount
Rebecca of Sunnybrook Farm	Marshall Neilan	Mary Pickford	Drama	Paramount
The Recoil	George Fitzmaurice	William Courtenay, Lilian Greuze	Drama	Pathe Exchange
Red, White and Blue Blood	Charles Brabin	Francis X. Bushman, Beverly Bayne	Comedy	Metro
The Red Woman	Harry R. Durant	Gail Kane, Mahlon Hamilton, June Elvidge	Western drama	World Film
Redemption	Joseph A. Golden	Evelyn Nesbit, Russell Thaw, Charles Wellesley	Drama	Independent
The Reed Case	Allen Holubar	Louise Lovely, Fred Montague	Drama	Universal
The Renaissance at Charleroi	Thomas R. Mills	Agnes Ayres, J. Frank Glendon	Drama	Vitagraph
The Regenerates	E. Mason Hopper	Alma Rubens, Walt Whitman	Drama	Triangle
Reputation	John B. O'Brien	Edna Goodrich, Mathilde Brundage	Drama	Mutual
The Rescue	Ida May Park	Lon Chaney, Dorothy Phillips	Drama	Universal
The Reward of the Faithless	Rex Ingram	Claire DuBray, Betty Schade, Wedgwood Nowell	Drama	Universal
A Rich Man's Plaything	Carl Harbaugh	Valeska Suratt, Edward Martindel	Drama	Fox
Richard the Brazen	Perry N. Vekroff	Harry T. Morey, Alice Joyce, Agnes Ayres	Comedy	Vitagraph
The Rise of Jennie Cushing	Maurice Tourneur	Elsie Ferguson, Elliott Dexter	Drama	Paramount
The Road Between	Joseph Levering	Marian Swayne, Bradley Barker	Drama	Independent
A Roadside Impresario	Donald Crisp	Julia Faye, Harry De Vere	Drama	Paramount
A Romance of the Redwoods	Cecil B. DeMille	Mary Pickford, Elliott Dexter, Raymond Hatton	Drama	Paramount
The Rose of Blood	J. Gordon Edwards	Theda Bara, Genevieve Blinn	Drama	Fox
Rosie O'Grady	John H. Collins	Viola Dana, Tom Blake	Drama	Independent
The Royal Pauper	Ben Turbett	Francine Larrimore, William Wadsworth	Drama	Edison
A Royal Romance	James Vincent	Virginia Pearson, Irving Cummings	Comedy	Fox
The Runaway	Dell Henderson	Julia Sanderson, Norman Trevor	Comedy	Mutual
Runaway Romany	George W. Lederer	Marion Davies, Joseph Kilgour, Matt Moore	Drama	Pathé Exchange

== S ==
Title	Director	Cast	Genre	Notes
Sacrifice	Frank Reicher	Margaret Illington, Jack Holt	Drama	Paramount
Sadie Goes to Heaven	W.S. Van Dyke	Mary McAllister, Rod La Rocque	Comedy	Essanay
The Saint's Adventure	Arthur Berthelet	Henry B. Walthall, Mary Charleson	Drama	Essany
The Saintly Sinner	Raymond Wells	Ruth Stonehouse, Jack Mulhall	Crime	Universal
Sally in a Hurry	Wilfrid North	Lillian Walker, Thomas R. Mills	Comedy	Vitagraph
Salt of the Earth	Saul Harrison	Claire Adams, Chester Barnett	Western	Edison
Sands of Sacrifice	Edward Sloman	William Russell, Francelia Billington	Drama	Mutual
Sapho	Hugh Ford	Pauline Frederick, Frank Losee	Drama	Paramount
Satan's Private Door	J. Charles Haydon	Mary Charleson, Webster Campbell	Drama	Essany
The Savage	Rupert Julian	Ruth Clifford, Colleen Moore	Drama	Universal
The Sawdust Ring	Charles Miller, Paul Powell	Bessie Love, Harold Goodwin	Drama	Triangle
Scandal	Charles Giblyn	Constance Talmadge, Harry C. Browne	Comedy	Selznick
The Scarlet Car	Joe De Grasse	Lon Chaney, Franklyn Farnum	Drama	Universal
The Scarlet Crystal	Charles Swickard	Herbert Rawlinson, Dorothy Davenport	Drama	Universal
The Scarlet Letter	Carl Harbaugh	Stuart Holmes, Dan Mason	Historical	Fox
The Scarlet Pimpernel	Richard Stanton	Dustin Farnum, Winifred Kingston	Adventure	Fox
A School for Husbands	George Melford	Fannie Ward, Jack Dean	Comedy	Paramount
The Sea Master	Edward Sloman	William Russell, Francelia Billington	Adventure	Mutual
The Secret Game	William C. deMille	Sessue Hayakawa, Jack Holt, Florence Vidor	Drama	Paramount
The Secret Man	John Ford	Harry Carey, Edythe Sterling	Western	Universal
The Secret of Eve	Perry N. Vekroff	Olga Petrova, Arthur Hoops	Drama	Metro
The Secret of the Storm Country	Charles Miller	Norma Talmadge, Niles Welch, Ethel Grey Terry	Drama	Selznick
A Self-Made Widow	Travers Vale	Alice Brady, John Bowers	Comedy	World
The Serpent's Tooth	Rollin S. Sturgeon	Gail Kane, William Conklin	Drama	Mutual
Seven Keys to Baldpate	Hugh Ford	George M. Cohan, Anna Q. Nilsson, Hedda Hopper	Mystery	Paramount
The Seven Swans	J. Searle Dawley	Marguerite Clark, Richard Barthelmess	Fantasy	Paramount
The Seventh Sin	Theodore Marston	Shirley Mason, George LeGuere	Drama	Triangle
The Shackles of Truth	Edward Sloman	William Russell, Francelia Billington	Drama	Mutual
Shall We Forgive Her?	Arthur Ashley	June Elvidge, John Bowers	Drama	World Film
Shame	John W. Noble	Zena Keefe, Lionel Belmore	Drama	General
She	Kenean Buel	Valeska Suratt, Ben Taggart	Adventure	Fox
The Ship of Doom	Wyndham Gittens	Claire McDowell, Monte Blue	Drama	Triangle
Shirley Kaye	Joseph Kaufman	Clara Kimball Young, George Fawcett	Drama	Selznick
Should She Obey?	George Siegmann	George Siegmann, Norbert A. Myles	Drama	Independent
The Show Down	Lynn Reynolds	Myrtle Gonzalez, George Hernandez	Drama	Universal
The Silence Sellers	Burton L. King	Olga Petrova, Mahlon Hamilton	Drama	Metro
The Silent Lady	Elsie Jane Wilson	Gretchen Lederer, Zoe Rae	Drama	Universal
The Silent Lie	Raoul Walsh	Miriam Cooper, Ralph Lewis	Drama	Fox
The Silent Man	William S. Hart	William S. Hart, Vola Vale, Robert McKim	Western	Paramount
The Silent Master	Léonce Perret	Robert Warwick, Olive Tell	Drama	Selznick
The Silent Partner	Marshall Neilan	Blanche Sweet, Thomas Meighan	Drama	Paramount
The Silent Witness	Harry Lambart	Gertrude McCoy, Frank O'Connor	Mystery	Independent
The Sin Woman	George W. Lederer	Irene Fenwick, Clifford Bruce	Drama	Independent
The Single Code	Tom Ricketts	Crane Wilbur, Al Ernest Garcia	Drama	Mutual
Sins of Ambition	Ivan Abramson	Wilfred Lucas, Anders Randolf	Drama	Independent
The Siren	Roland West	Valeska Suratt, Clifford Bruce	Western	Fox
Sirens of the Sea	Allen Holubar	Louise Lovely, Carmel Myers, Jack Mulhall	Fantasy	Universal
Sister Against Sister	James Vincent	Virginia Pearson, Walter Law	Drama	Fox
The Sixteenth Wife	Charles Brabin	Peggy Hyland, Marc McDermott	Comedy	Vitagraph
The Skylight Room	Martin Justice	Jean Paige, Carlton S. King	Drama	Vitagraph
Skinner's Baby	Harry Beaumont	Bryant Washburn, Hazel Daly	Comedy	Essanay
Skinner's Bubble	Harry Beaumont	Bryant Washburn, Hazel Daly	Comedy	Essanay
Skinner's Dress Suit	Harry Beaumont	Bryant Washburn, Hazel Daly	Comedy	Essanay
The Slacker	Christy Cabanne	Emily Stevens, Walter Miller	Drama	Metro
The Slave	William Nigh	Valeska Suratt, Herbert Heyes	Drama	Fox
The Slave Market	Hugh Ford	Pauline Frederick, Thomas Meighan	Adventure	Paramount
Sleeping Fires	Hugh Ford	Pauline Frederick, Thomas Meighan	Drama	Paramount
A Sleeping Memory	George D. Baker	Emily Stevens, Frank R. Mills	Drama	Metro
Sloth	Theodore Marston	Charlotte Walker, Shirley Mason	Drama	Triangle
The Small Town Girl	John G. Adolfi	June Caprice, Jane Lee	Drama	Fox
The Small Town Guy	Lawrence C. Windom	Taylor Holmes, Helen Ferguson	Comedy	Essanay
Snap Judgment	Edward Sloman	William Russell, Francelia Billington	Western comedy	Mutual
The Snarl	Raymond West	Bessie Barriscale, Charles Gunn	Drama	Triangle
The Social Leper	Harley Knoles	Carlyle Blackwell, June Elvidge, Arthur Ashley	Drama	World
Society's Driftwood	Louis Chaudet	Grace Cunard, Charles West	Drama	Universal
Sold at Auction	Sherwood MacDonald	Lois Meredith, William Conklin, Marguerite Nichols	Drama	Pathé Exchange
Soldiers of Chance	Paul Scardon	Evart Overton, Julia Swayne Gordon	Adventure	Vitagraph
Some Boy!	Otis Turner	George Walsh, Doris Pawn, Herschel Mayall	Comedy	Fox
Somewhere in America	William C. Dowlan	Francine Larrimore, Herbert Hayes	Drama	Metro
The Son of His Father	Victor Schertzinger	Charles Ray, Vola Vale	Drama	Paramount
A Son of the Hills	Harry Davenport	Antonio Moreno, Julia Swayne Gordon	Drama	Vitagraph
A Song of Sixpence	Ralph Dean	Robert Conness, Marie Wayne	Drama	Independent
The Soul Master	Marguerite Bertsch	Earle Williams, Julia Swayne Gordon	Drama	Vitagraph
The Soul of a Magdalen	Burton L. King	Olga Petrova, Wyndham Standing, Mahlon Hamilton	Drama	Metro
The Soul of Satan	Otis Turner	Gladys Brockwell, Bertram Grassby, Charles Clary	Drama	Fox
Souls Adrift	Harley Knoles	Ethel Clayton, Milton Sills	Drama	World
Souls in Pawn	Henry King	Gail Kane, Douglas MacLean	Spy	Mutual
Souls Triumphant	John B. O'Brien	Lillian Gish, Wilfred Lucas	Drama	Triangle
Southern Justice	Lynn Reynolds	Myrtle Gonzalez, George Hernandez, Jean Hersholt	Drama	Universal
Southern Pride	Henry King	Gail Kane, Lew Cody	Drama	Mutual
Sowers and Reapers	George D. Baker	Emmy Wehlen, Frank Currier	Drama	Metro
S.O.S.	William Buckley	Richard Travers, William Buckley	Drama	Independent
The Spindle of Life	George Cochrane	Ben F. Wilson, Neva Gerber	Comedy	Universal
The Spirit of '76	Frank Montgomery	Adda Gleason, Howard Gaye	Historical	Independent
The Spirit of Romance	E. Mason Hopper	Vivian Martin, Colin Chase	Drama	Paramount
The Spotted Lily	Harry Solter	Ella Hall, Jack Nelson	Drama	Universal
The Spy	Richard Stanton	Dustin Farnum, Winifred Kingston, William Burress	Thriller	Fox Film
The Spreading Dawn	Laurence Trimble	Jane Cowl, Orme Caldara	Drama	Goldwyn
A Square Deal	Harley Knoles	Carlyle Blackwell, June Elvidge, Henry Hull	Drama	World Film
The Square Deal Man	William S. Hart	William S. Hart, Mary McIvor	Western	Triangle
The Square Deceiver	Fred J. Balshofer	Harold Lockwood, Pauline Curley, William Clifford	Comedy	Metro
The Squaw Man's Son	Edward LeSaint	Wallace Reid, Anita King	Western	Paramount
Stage Struck	Edward Morrissey	Dorothy Gish, Spottiswoode Aitken	Drama	Triangle
The Stainless Barrier	Thomas N. Heffron	Irene Hunt, Jack Livingston, Henry A. Barrows	Drama	Triangle
The Stolen Paradise	Harley Knoles	Ethel Clayton, Edward Langford, Pinna Nesbit	Drama	World Film
The Stolen Play	Harry Harvey	Ruth Roland, William Conklin	Drama	General
The Stolen Treaty	Paul Scardon	Earle Williams, Denton Vane	Drama	Vitagraph
A Stormy Knight	Elmer Clifton	Franklyn Farnum, Jean Hersholt, Agnes Vernon	Comedy	Universal
Straight Shooting	John Ford	Harry Carey, Molly Malone	Western	Universal
Stranded in Arcady	Frank Hall Crane	Irene Castle, Elliott Dexter, George Majeroni	Adventure	Pathé Exchange
A Strange Transgressor	Reginald Barker	Louise Glaum, Colin Chase	Drama	Triangle
The Streets of Illusion	William Parke	Gladys Hulette, J.H. Gilmour, Richard Barthelmess	Drama	Pathé Exchange
Strife	Lambert Hillyer	George Le Guere, Frank Andrews	Drama	Independent
The Strong Way	George Kelson	June Elvidge, John Bowers	Drama	World Film
A Successful Failure	Arthur Rosson	Jack Devereaux, Winifred Allen	Comedy	Triangle
The Sudden Gentleman	Thomas N. Heffron	William Desmond, Jack Richardson	Comedy	Triangle
Sudden Jim	Victor Schertzinger	Charles Ray, Sylvia Breamer	Drama	Triangle
Sunlight's Last Raid	William Wolbert	Gayne Whitman, Mary Anderson	Western	Vitagraph
Sunny Jane	Sherwood MacDonald	Jackie Saunders, Edward Jobson	Comedy	Mutual
The Sunset Trail	George Melford	Vivian Martin, Henry A. Barrows	Drama	Paramount
Sunshine Alley	John W. Noble	Mae Marsh, Robert Harron, Dion Titheradge	Drama	Goldwyn
Sunshine and Gold	Henry King	Marie Osborne, Henry King (director)	Drama	Pathe Exchange
Susan's Gentleman	Edwin Stevens	Violet Mersereau, James O'Neill	Drama	Universal
Sweetheart of the Doomed	Reginald Barker	Louise Glaum, Charles Gunn, Tom Guise	Drama	Triangle
Sylvia of the Secret Service	George Fitzmaurice	Irene Castle, Elliott Dexter, Erich von Stroheim	Thriller	Pathé Exchange

== T ==
Title	Director	Cast	Genre	Notes
A Tale of Two Cities	Frank Lloyd	William Farnum, Jewel Carmen, Herschel Mayall	Historical	Fox
Tangled Lives	J. Gordon Edwards	Genevieve Hamper, Stuart Holmes	Drama	Fox
The Tar Heel Warrior	E. Mason Hopper	Walt Whitman, Ann Forrest	Drama	Triangle
Tears and Smiles	William Bertram	Marie Osborne, Philo McCullough	Drama	Pathé Exchange
The Tell-Tale Step	Burton George	Pat O'Malley, Shirley Mason	Crime	Edison
Ten of Diamonds	Raymond B. West	Dorothy Dalton, Jack Livingston, J. Barney Sherry	Drama	Triangle
The Tenderfoot	William Duncan	Carol Holloway, Walter Rodgers	Western	Vitagraph
The Tenth Case	George Kelson	June Elvidge, John Bowers, George MacQuarrie	Drama	World
The Terror	Raymond Wells	Jack Mulhall, Jean Hersholt	Crime	Universal
Thais	Hugo Ballin, Frank Hall Crane	Mary Garden, Crauford Kent	Drama	Goldwyn
Their Compact	Edwin Carewe	Francis X. Bushman, Beverly Bayne	Western	Metro
Think It Over	Herbert Blaché	Catherine Calvert, Richard Tucker	Drama	Independent
This Is the Life	Raoul Walsh	George Walsh, Wanda Hawley	Comedy	Fox
Those Who Pay	Raymond B. West	Bessie Barriscale, Howard Hickman	Drama	Independent
Those Without Sin	Marshall Neilan	Blanche Sweet, Tom Forman	Drama	Paramount
Thou Shalt Not Steal	William Nigh	Virginia Pearson, Claire Whitney	Drama	Fox
Threads of Fate	Eugene Nowland	Viola Dana, Richard Tucker	Drama	Metro
The Tides of Barnegat	Marshall Neilan	Blanche Sweet, Elliott Dexter	Drama	Paramount
The Tides of Fate	Marshall Farnum	William Sheer, Charles E. Graham	Drama	World
The Tiger Woman	J. Gordon Edwards	Theda Bara, Edward Roseman, Louis Dean	Drama	Fox
Tillie Wakes Up	Harry Davenport	Marie Dressler, Rubye De Remer	Comedy	World
Time Locks and Diamonds	Walter Edwards	William Desmond, Gloria Hope, Robert McKim	Crime	Triangle
To Honor and Obey	Otis Turner	Gladys Brockwell, Bertram Grassby	Drama	Fox
To the Death	Burton L. King	Olga Petrova, Mahlon Hamilton	Drama	Metro
To-Day	Ralph Ince	Florence Reed, Frank R. Mills	Drama	Independent
Told at Twilight	Henry King	Marie Osborne, Beatrice Van	Drama	Pathé Exchange
Tom Sawyer	William Desmond Taylor	Jack Pickford, Helen Gilmore, Clara Horton	Adventure	Paramount
The Trail of the Shadow	Edwin Carewe	Emmy Wehlen, William B. Davidson	Drama	Metro
Transgression	Paul Scardon	Earle Williams, Corinne Griffith	Drama	Vitagraph
Treason	Allen Holubar	Allen Holubar, Lois Wilson	War	Universal
Treasure Island	Chester M. Franklin, Sidney Franklin	Francis Carpenter, Virginia Lee Corbin, Lewis Sargent	Adventure	Fox
Triumph	Joe De Grasse	Lon Chaney, Dorothy Phillips	Drama	Universal
The Trouble Buster	Frank Reicher	Vivian Martin, James Neill	Drama	Paramount
Trouble Makers	Kenean Buel	Jane Lee, Katherine Lee	Drama	Fox
The Trufflers	Fred E. Wright	Nell Craig, Sidney Ainsworth, Ernest Maupain	Drama	Essanay
Truthful Tulliver	William S. Hart	William S. Hart, Alma Rubens, Nina Byron	Western	Triangle
Twin Kiddies	Henry King	Marie Osborne, Edward Josbon	Comedy drama	Pathé Exchange
Two-Bit Seats	Lawrence C. Windom	Taylor Holmes, Marguerite Clayton, Sidney Ainsworth	Comedy	Essanay
Two Little Imps	Kenean Buel	Jane Lee, Leslie Austin	Comedy	Fox
Two Men and a Woman	William Humphrey	Christine Mayo, Rubye De Remer	Drama	Independent

== U–V ==
Title	Director	Cast	Genre	Notes
Unconquered	Frank Reicher	Fannie Ward, Tully Marshall	Drama	Paramount
Under False Colors	Emile Chautard	Frederick Warde, Jeanne Eagels	Drama	Pathe Exchange
Under Handicap	Fred J. Balshofer	Harold Lockwood, Ann Little	Western	Metro
The Understudy	William Bertram	Mollie McConnell, Frank Erlanger	Drama	General
The Undying Flame	Maurice Tourneur	Olga Petrova, Mahlon Hamilton	Drama	Paramount
The Unforeseen	John B. O'Brien	Olive Tell, David Powell	Drama	Mutual
Unknown 274	Harry F. Millarde	June Caprice, Richard Neill	Drama	Fox
Until They Get Me	Frank Borzage	Pauline Starke, Jack Curtis	Drama	Triangle
Up or Down?	Lynn Reynolds	George Hernandez, Fritzi Ridgeway, John Gilbert	Western	Triangle
The Upper Crust	Rollin S. Sturgeon	Gail Kane, Eugenie Forde	Comedy	Mutual
The Valentine Girl	J. Searle Dawley	Marguerite Clark, Richard Barthelmess	Drama	Paramount
The Varmint	William Desmond Taylor	Jack Pickford, Louise Huff	Comedy	Paramount
Vengeance Is Mine	Frank Hall Crane	Irene Castle, Frank Sheridan, Helene Chadwick	Drama	Pathé Exchange
Vera, the Medium	Broncho Billy Anderson	Kitty Gordon, Lowell Sherman	Drama	Selznick
The Vicar of Wakefield	Ernest C. Warde	Frederick Warde, Boyd Marshall, Kathryn Adams	Historical	Pathé Exchange
The Voice of Conscience	Edwin Carewe	Francis X. Bushman, Beverly Bayne	Drama	Metro
The Volunteer	Harley Knoles	Madge Evans, Henry Hull, Muriel Ostriche	Drama	World

== W–Z ==
Title	Director	Cast	Genre	Notes
The Waiting Soul	Burton L. King	Olga Petrova, Mahlon Hamilton, Mathilde Brundage	Drama	Metro
War and the Woman	Ernest C. Warde	Florence La Badie, Grace Henderson	War	Pathé Exchange
The Warfare of the Flesh	Edward Warren	Sheldon Lewis, Harry Benham, Walter Hampden	Drama	Independent
The Wax Model	E. Mason Hopper	Vivian Martin, Thomas Holding	Drama	Paramount
The Weaker Sex	Raymond B. West	Dorothy Dalton, Louise Glaum, Charles Ray	Drama	Triangle
The Web of Desire	Emile Chautard	Ethel Clayton, Rockliffe Fellowes	Drama	World
The Web of Life	George K. Rolands	James Cruze, Billy Quirk	Drama	Independent
Wee Lady Betty	Charles Miller, Frank Borzage	Bessie Love, Frank Borzage, Charles K. French	Drama	Triangle
What Money Can't Buy	Lou Tellegen	Jack Pickford, Louise Huff, Theodore Roberts	Drama	Paramount
When a Man Sees Red	Frank Lloyd	William Farnum, Jewel Carmen	Drama	Fox
When Baby Forgot	Eugene Moore	Marie Osborne, Marguerite Nichols	Drama	Pathe Exchange
When False Tongues Speak	Carl Harbaugh	Virginia Pearson, Hardee Kirkland, Claire Whitney	Drama	Fox
When Love Was Blind	Frederic Richard Sullivan	Florence La Badie, Thomas A. Curran, Boyd Marshall	Drama	Pathé Exchange
When Men Are Tempted	William Wolbert	Gayne Whitman, Otto Lederer	Drama	Vitagraph
When You and I Were Young	Alice Guy	Alma Hanlon, Harry Benham	Drama	Independent
Where Love Is	William J. Locke	Anna Murdock, Shirley Mason	Drama	Mutual
The Whip	Maurice Tourneur	Alma Hanlon, June Elvidge, Irving Cummings	Drama	Independent
The White Raven	George D. Baker	Ethel Barrymore, William B. Davidson	Drama	Metro
Whither Thou Goest	Raymond B. West	Rhea Mitchell, Orrin Johnson	Drama	Independent
Who Goes There?	William P.S. Earle	Harry T. Morey, Corinne Griffith	Drama	Vitagraph
Who Knows?	Jack Pratt	Betty Brice, Charles Arling	Western	Independent
Who Shall Take My Life?	Colin Campbell	Tom Santschi, Fritzi Brunette	Drama	Selig
Who Was the Other Man?	Francis Ford	Duke Worne, Beatrice Van	Drama	Universal
Who's Your Neighbor?	S. Rankin Drew	Christine Mayo, Anders Randolf	Drama	Independent
Whose Wife?	Rollin S. Sturgeon	Gail Kane, Harry von Meter	Drama	Mutual
A Wife by Proxy	John H. Collins	Mabel Taliaferro, Robert Walker, Sally Crute	Drama	Metro
Wife Number Two	William Nigh	Valeska Suratt, Mathilde Brundage	Drama	Fox
A Wife on Trial	Ruth Ann Baldwin	Mignon Anderson, George Pearce	Drama	Universal
Wild and Woolly	John Emerson	Douglas Fairbanks, Eileen Percy	Western comedy	Paramount
The Wildcat	Sherwood MacDonald	Jackie Saunders, Mollie McConnell	Comedy	Mutual
The Wild Girl	Howard Estabrook	Eva Tanguay, Thomas J. Moore	Comedy drama	Selznick
Wild Sumac	William V. Mong	Margery Wilson, Ed Brady	Drama	Triangle
Wild Winship's Widow	Charles Miller	Dorothy Dalton, Rowland V. Lee, Joe King	Comedy	Triangle
The Winged Mystery	Joseph De Grasse	Franklyn Farnum, Claire Du Brey	War	Universal
The Winning of Sally Temple	George Melford	Fannie Ward, Walter Long	Drama	Paramount
Within the Law	William P.S. Earle	Alice Joyce, Harry T. Morey, Adele DeGarde	Crime	Vitagraph
Wolf Lowry	William S. Hart	William S. Hart, Margery Wilson	Western	Triangle
A Woman Alone	Harry Davenport	Alice Brady, Edward Langford, Edward Kimball	Drama	World Film
The Woman and the Beast	Ernest C. Warde	Alphonse Ethier, Kathryn Adams	Drama	Independent
A Woman's Awakening	Chester Withey	Seena Owen, Kate Bruce	Drama	Triangle
The Woman Beneath	Travers Vale	Ethel Clayton, Crauford Kent	Drama	World
The Woman God Forgot	Cecil B. DeMille	Geraldine Farrar, Wallace Reid, Raymond Hatton	Historical	Paramount
The Woman in White	Ernest C. Warde	Florence La Badie, Richard R. Neill	Drama	Pathe Exchange
Womanhood, the Glory of the Nation	J. Stuart Blackton, William P.S. Earle	Alice Joyce, Harry T. Morey, Joseph Kilgour	War drama	Vitagraph
Wooden Shoes	Raymond B. West	Bessie Barriscale, Jack Livingston, Joseph J. Dowling	Drama	Triangle
The World Apart	William Desmond Taylor	Wallace Reid, Myrtle Stedman	Western	Paramount
Wrath	Theodore Marston	H.B. Warner, Shirley Mason	Drama	Triangle
Wrath of Love	James Vincent	Virginia Pearson, Irving Cummings	Drama	Fox
Yankee Pluck	George Archainbaud	Ethel Clayton, Montagu Love, Johnny Hines	Drama	World
The Yankee Way	Richard Stanton	George Walsh, Enid Markey	Comedy	Fox
Young Mother Hubbard	Arthur Berthelet	Mary McAllister, William Clifford, Granville Bates	Drama	Essanay
Your Obedient Servant	Edward H. Griffith	Claire Adams, Pat O'Malley	Drama	Edison
Youth	Romaine Fielding	Carlyle Blackwell, June Elvidge, Johnny Hines	Drama	World
Zollenstein	Edgar Jones	Monroe Salisbury, Vola Vale	Drama	General

== Short films ==
Title	Director	Cast	Genre	Notes
The Adventurer	Charles Chaplin	Charlie Chaplin, Edna Purviance	Comedy	
All Aboard	Alfred J. Goulding	Harold Lloyd, Bebe Daniels	Comedy	
Bashful	Alfred J. Goulding	Harold Lloyd, Bebe Daniels	Comedy	
The Big Idea	Gilbert Pratt	Harold Lloyd, Bebe Daniels	Comedy	
Birds of a Feather		Harold Lloyd, Snub Pollard	Comedy	
Bliss	Alfred J. Goulding	Harold Lloyd, Bebe Daniels	Comedy	
The Butcher Boy	Fatty Arbuckle	Fatty Arbuckle, Buster Keaton	Comedy	
By the Sad Sea Waves	Alfred J. Goulding	Harold Lloyd	Comedy	
Cheyenne's Pal	John Ford	Harry Carey, Gertrude Astor	Western	
Clubs Are Trump	Hal Roach	Harold Lloyd	Comedy	
Coney Island	Fatty Arbuckle	Fatty Arbuckle, Buster Keaton	Comedy	
The Cure	Charlie Chaplin	Charlie Chaplin, Edna Purviance, Eric Campbell	Comedy	
Easy Street	Charles Chaplin	Charlie Chaplin, Edna Purviance	Comedy	
The Flirt	Billy Gilbert	Harold Lloyd, Bebe Daniels	Comedy	
From Laramie to London	Hal Roach	Harold Lloyd	Comedy	
His Wedding Night	Roscoe Arbuckle	Fatty Arbuckle, Buster Keaton	Comedy	
The Immigrant	Charles Chaplin	Charlie Chaplin, Edna Purviance	Comedy	
Lonesome Luke, Lawyer	Hal Roach	Harold Lloyd	Comedy short	
Lonesome Luke, Mechanic	Hal Roach	Harold Lloyd	Comedy short	
Lonesome Luke, Messenger	Hal Roach	Harold Lloyd	Comedy short	
Lonesome Luke, Plumber	Hal Roach	Harold Lloyd	Comedy short	
Lonesome Luke Loses Patients	Hal Roach	Harold Lloyd	Comedy short	
Lonesome Luke on Tin Can Alley	Hal Roach	Harold Lloyd	Comedy short	
Lonesome Luke's Honeymoon	Hal Roach	Harold Lloyd	Comedy short	
Lonesome Luke's Lively Life	Hal Roach	Harold Lloyd	Comedy short	
Lonesome Luke's Lovely Rifle	Hal Roach	Harold Lloyd	Comedy short	
Lonesome Luke's Wild Women	Hal Roach	Harold Lloyd	Comedy short	
Love, Laughs and Lather	Hal Roach	Harold Lloyd, Bebe Daniels	Comedy	
Luke Wins Ye Ladye Faire	Hal Roach	Harold Lloyd	Comedy short	
Luke's Busy Day	Hal Roach	Harold Lloyd	Comedy short	
Luke's Lost Liberty	Hal Roach	Harold Lloyd	Comedy short	
Luke's Trolley Troubles	Hal Roach	Harold Lloyd	Comedy short	
Move On	Gilbert Pratt	Harold Lloyd	Comedy	
Oh Doctor!	Roscoe Arbuckle	Fatty Arbuckle, Buster Keaton	Comedy	
Over the Fence	Harold Lloyd	Harold Lloyd	Comedy	
Pinched	Harold Lloyd	Harold Lloyd	Comedy	
Rainbow Island	Billy Gilbert	Harold Lloyd	Comedy	
A Reckless Romeo	Roscoe Arbuckle	Fatty Arbuckle, Al St. John	Comedy	
The Rough House	Roscoe Arbuckle, Buster Keaton	Fatty Arbuckle, Buster Keaton	Comedy	
Step Lively	Alfred J. Goulding	Harold Lloyd	Comedy	
Stop! Luke! Listen!	Hal Roach	Harold Lloyd	Comedy	
Teddy at the Throttle	Clarence G. Badger	Gloria Swanson, Bobby Vernon, Wallace Beery	Comedy	
The Tornado	John Ford	John Ford	Western	
We Never Sleep		Harold Lloyd	Comedy	

== See also ==
- 1917 in the United States
