= The Trunk Mystery (1926 film) =

1926 film

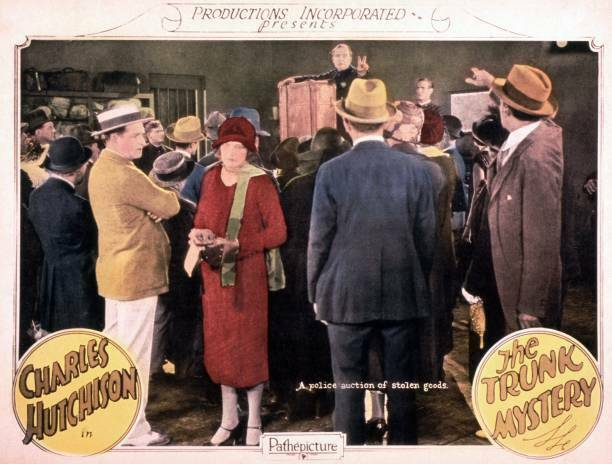
- Directed by: Frank Hall Crane
- Written by: Frederick Chapin; Forrest Sheldon
- Starring: Charles Hutchison; Alice Calhoun; Otto Lederer
- Cinematography: Leon Shamroy
- Production company: Pathé Exchange
- Distributed by: Pathe Exchange; Woolf and Freedman (UK)
- Release dates: December 20, 1926 (UK); June 12, 1927 (U.S.)
- Running time: 50 minutes
- Country: United States
- Languages: Silent; English intertitles

The Trunk Mystery is a 1926 American silent mystery film directed by Frank Hall Crane and starring Charles Hutchison, Alice Calhoun and Otto Lederer. It premiered in Britain in late 1926 before being released in America the following year.

== Synopsis ==
A former secret agent acquired a trunk at a police auction, and the same night his house is robbed. It becomes apparent that some criminals stashed their loot in the trunk a few years before.

== Cast ==
- Charles Hutchison as Jim Manning
- Alice Calhoun as Marion Hampton
- Richard Neill as Joe Fawcett
- Ben Walker as Turner
- Ford Sterling as Jeff
- Otto Lederer as Stevanov
- Charles W. Mack as John Hampton

== Bibliography ==
- Wlaschin, Ken. Silent Mystery and Detective Movies: A Comprehensive Filmography. McFarland, 2009.
