= William Parker (screenwriter) =

American screenwriter

- Born: September 17, 1886; Walla Walla, Washington, United States
- Died: July 8, 1941 (aged 54); New York City, United States
- Occupation: Screenwriter
- Years active: 1913–1921

William Parker (September 17, 1886 – July 8, 1941) was an American screenwriter. He wrote the screenplay for more than thirty films from 1913 to 1921.

== Selected filmography ==
- The Cave Girl (1921)
- The Virgin of Stamboul (1920)
- The Jack-Knife Man (1920)
- The Family Honor (1920)
- Revenge (1918)
- A Weaver of Dreams (1918)
- Hearts or Diamonds? (1918)
- The Scarlet Car(1917)
- Money Madness (1917)
- The Winged Mystery (1917)
- Who Was the Other Man? (1917)
- The Mainspring (1916)
- The Courtesan (1916)
