= A Natural Man =

1915 film by Ulysses Davis

- Directed by: Ulysses Davis
- Produced by: Vitagraph Company of America
- Starring: Gayne Whitman; Myrtle Gonzalez
- Distributed by: General Film Company
- Release date: July 13, 1915
- Running time: 2 reels
- Country: USA
- Language: Silent..English titles

A Natural Man is a 1915 silent film drama short directed by Ulysses Davis and produced by the Vitagraph Company of America. The General Film Company distributed the film.

The film is preserved in the Library of Congress collection.

== Cast ==
- Gayne Whitman - Karl Holden (*Alfred Vosburgh)
- Myrtle Gonzalez - Rose, Karl's Sweetheart
- Otto Lederer - Karl's Father
- George Stanley - Rose's Uncle
