= The Light of Victory =

1919 film

- Directed by: William Wolbert
- Written by: Waldemar Young (scenario); George C. Hull (short story)
- Produced by: Bluebird Photoplays
- Starring: Monroe Salisbury
- Cinematography: Harry Harris
- Distributed by: Universal Film Manufacturing Company
- Release date: March 17, 1919
- Running time: 5 reels (approximately 50 minutes)
- Country: United States
- Language: Silent (English intertitles)

The Light of Victory is a 1919 American silent drama film directed by William Wolbert and starring Monroe Salisbury. The screenplay was written by Waldemar Young based on the short story "Breathes There the Man--" by George C. Hull, which was originally printed in Scribner's Magazine in 1917.

== Cast ==
- Monroe Salisbury as Lieutenant George Blenton
- Bob Edmond as "Traction Jim" Cripps
- Fred Wilson as Lieutenant Kenwood Cripps
- Andrew Robson as Captain Ned Ravenslee
- Fred Kelsey as Captain Eric von Prohme
- Betty Compson as Jane Ravenslee
- Norval MacGregor as Andy
- Beatrice Dominguez as Lehua
- George Nichols as Otto Schmidt

== Preservation ==
The Light of Victory is currently presumed lost. In February of 2021, the film was cited by the National Film Preservation Board on their Lost U.S. Silent Feature Films list.

== See also ==
- List of lost films
