= Nellie Anderson =

American stage and film actress

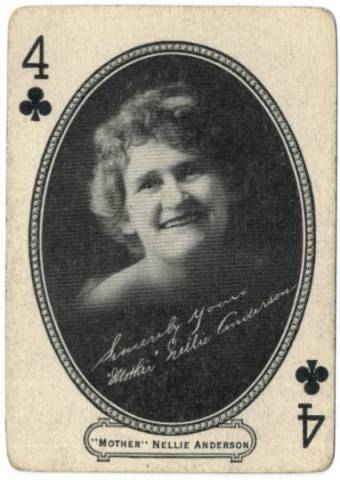
- Anderson c. 1916
- Born: Ellen Reilly; February 22, 1870; New York City, United States
- Died: July 12, 1960 (aged 90); California, United States
- Occupation: Actress
- Spouse: Nicholas Anderson
- Children: Mary Anderson

Nellie Anderson (June 22, 1870 – July 12, 1960) was an American stage and film actress who worked during the silent film era.

== Life and career ==
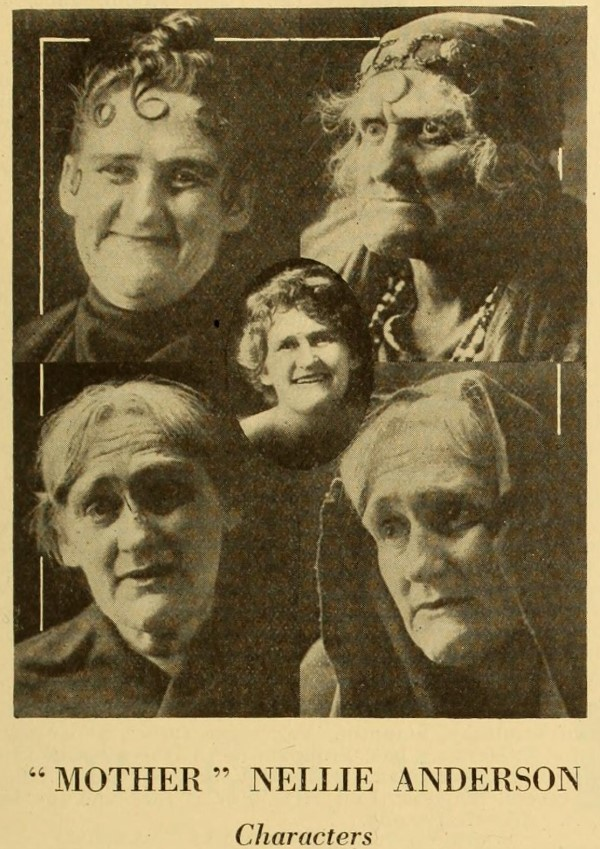
"Mother" Nellie Anderson Character Portraits

Nellie Anderson was born Ellen Reilly in New York on the 22nd of June 1870. She was married to Nicholas Anderson and they had four daughters, including the actress Mary Anderson. Daughter Beatrice also appeared on film.

Anderson appeared on stage under the name Helen Relyea. In 1915 she changed her name to Helen Anderson. However, she was also known as Nellie Anderson or "Mother" Nellie Anderson. She was also credited as Mrs Anderson or Mother Anderson.

Around 1919, Nellie moved to Los Angeles. Nicholas died in 1930 and Nellie died in 1960 in San Bernardino, California.

== Partial filmography ==
- The Egyptian Mummy (1914) The Landlady
- Ethel Gets the Evidence (1915) Mrs. Jones
- Anselo Lee (1915) Old Mrs Lee
- The Scarlet Runner (1916) The Landlady
- The Little Duchess (1917) Mrs Dawson
- Little Women (1918) Hannah
- Castles in the Air (1919) Mrs. Larrymore
