= Tangled Skeins =

- Gayne Whitman, Vivian Rich, and Louise Lester in a publicity still.
- Directed by: E. Mason Hopper
- Starring: Vivian Rich; Gayne Whitman
- Production company: American Film Manufacturing Company
- Distributed by: Mutual Film Company
- Release date: June 29, 1916
- Running time: 3 reels
- Country: United States
- Language: Silent..English titles

Tangled Skeins is a 1916 American silent drama short film directed by E. Mason Hopper. It was released by the Mutual Film Company.

== Cast ==
- Gayne Whitman - Randall Wellington (*billed Alfred Vosburgh)
- Vivian Rich - Laura Doone
- Beverly Juneau - Countess Isabel
- Louise Lester - Mrs. Wellington
- Emma Kluge - Mrs. Rodney
- George Periolat - Carl Curtis
- Harry McCabe -

== Preservation ==
A print is held by the George Eastman Museum, and the film is preserved in the Library of Congress collection (Packard Campus is part of the Library of Congress system).
