= By Right of Possession =

1917 film

- Directed by: William Wolbert
- Written by: Alvah Milton Kerr; Garfield Thompson
- Starring: Mary Anderson; Antonio Moreno; Otto Lederer
- Cinematography: Reginald Lyons
- Production company: Vitagraph Company of America
- Distributed by: Vitagraph Company of America
- Release date: July 30, 1917
- Running time: 50 minutes
- Country: United States
- Languages: Silent; English intertitles

By Right of Possession is a 1917 American silent Western film directed by William Wolbert and starring Mary Anderson, Antonio Moreno and Otto Lederer.

== Cast ==
- Mary Anderson as Kate Saxon
- Antonio Moreno as Tom Baxter
- Otto Lederer as Bells
- Leon De La Mothe as Trimble

== Censorship ==
Before By Right of Possession could be exhibited in Kansas, the Kansas Board of Review required the removal of a scene where Bells is brutally beaten, and of another scene where a calf is branded.

== Preservation ==
With no holdings located in archives, By Right of Possession is considered a lost film.

== Bibliography ==
- Langman, Larry. American Film Cycles: The Silent Era. Greenwood Publishing, 1998.
