= The Divorcee (1917 film) =

1917 film

- Directed by: William Wolbert
- Written by: Rufus Steele
- Starring: Mary Anderson; Gayne Whitman; Pliny Goodfriend
- Cinematography: Reginald Lyons
- Production company: Vitagraph Company of America
- Distributed by: Vitagraph Company of America
- Release date: August 27, 1917
- Running time: 50 minutes
- Country: United States
- Languages: Silent; English intertitles

The Divorcee is a 1917 American silent Western film directed by William Wolbert and starring Mary Anderson, Gayne Whitman and Pliny Goodfriend.

== Cast ==
- Mary Anderson, as Wanda Carson
- Gayne Whitman, as Reverend Jerry Gerguson
- Pliny Goodfriend, as Sam Carson
- Jean Hathaway, as Mrs. Pelham-Wilson

== Preservation ==
With no holdings located in archives, The Divorcee is considered a lost film.
