= Money Madness (1917 film) =

- Directed by: Henry MacRae
- Written by: William Parker; Frank H. Spearman (novel)
- Starring: Charles Hill Mailes; Gayne Whitman; Mary MacLaren
- Cinematography: Fred LeRoy Granville
- Production company: Universal Pictures
- Distributed by: Universal Pictures
- Release date: May 28, 1917
- Running time: 50 minutes
- Country: United States
- Languages: Silent; English intertitles

Money Madness is a 1917 American silent crime drama film directed by Henry MacRae and starring Charles Hill Mailes, Gayne Whitman and Mary MacLaren.

== Cast ==
- Charles Hill Mailes as Whispering Smith
- Don Bailey as George Fuller
- Gayne Whitman as Tom Williams
- Mary MacLaren as Ethel Fuller
- Rex De Rosselli as Dr. Mercer
- Eddie Polo as 'Harford' Red
- M. Everett as Monroe Simmons

== Bibliography ==
- Robert B. Connelly. The Silents: Silent Feature Films, 1910-36, Volume 40, Issue 2. December Press, 1998.
