= William Wolbert =

American actor and screenwriter (1883–1918)

- Born: 1883; Petersburg, Virginia, United States
- Died: December 12, 1918 (aged 35); Los Angeles, California, United States
- Occupations: Actor, director
- Years active: 1913–1918 (film)

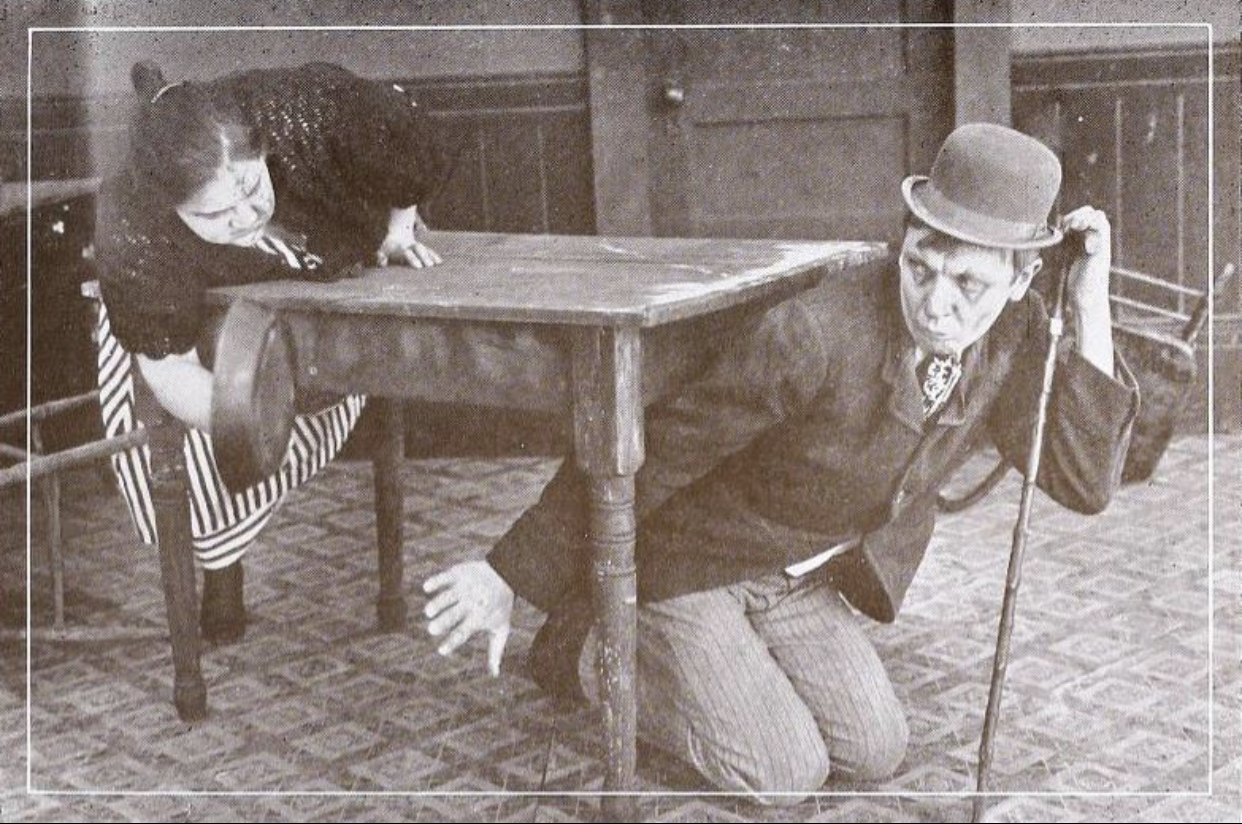
Merta Sterling (left) and William Wolbert (right) in Willie Whipple's Dream (1915)

William Wolbert (1883–1918) was an American actor and film director of the silent era. He directed for Vitagraph and Universal Pictures before his career was cut short by his death.

== Selected filmography ==
=== Actor ===
- The Burned Hand (1915)
- The Dumb Girl of Portici (1916)

=== Director ===
- Aladdin from Broadway (1917)
- The Divorcee (1917)
- The Flaming Omen (1917)
- Captain of the Gray Horse Troop (1917)
- The Magnificent Meddler (1917)
- When Men Are Tempted (1917)
- Sunlight's Last Raid (1917)
- Money Magic (1917)
- By Right of Possession (1917)
- That Devil, Bateese (1918)
- The Light of Victory (1919)

== Bibliography ==
- Ken Wlaschin. Silent Mystery and Detective Movies: A Comprehensive Filmography. McFarland, 2009.
