= The Magnificent Meddler =

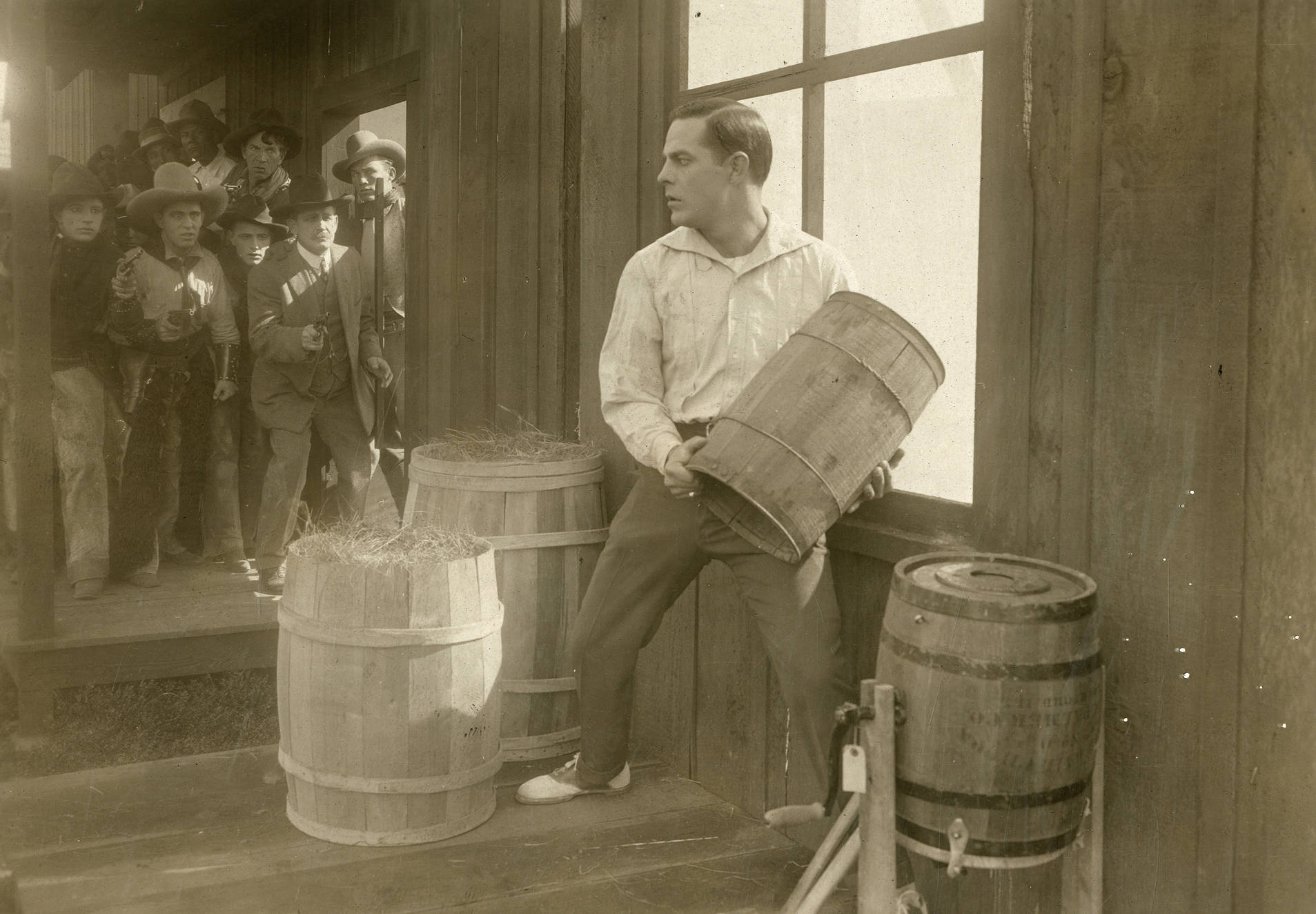
- Directed by: William Wolbert
- Written by: Lawrence McCloskey; Garfield Thompson
- Starring: Antonio Moreno; Mary Anderson; Otto Lederer
- Cinematography: Reginald Lyons
- Production company: Vitagraph Company of America
- Distributed by: Vitagraph Company of America
- Release date: June 4, 1917
- Running time: 50 minutes
- Country: United States
- Languages: Silent; English intertitles

The Magnificent Meddler is a 1917 American silent comedy film directed by William Wolbert and starring Antonio Moreno, Mary Anderson and Otto Lederer.

== Cast ==
- Antonio Moreno as Montague Emerson
- Mary Anderson as Jess Roth
- Otto Lederer as Bob Gill
- Leon De La Mothe as Pete Marillo
- George Kunkel as Big Joe Roth

== Bibliography ==
- Ness, Richard. From Headline Hunter to Superman: A Journalism Filmography. Scarecrow Press, 1997.
