= Mary Anderson (actress, born 1897) =

American actress (1897–1986)

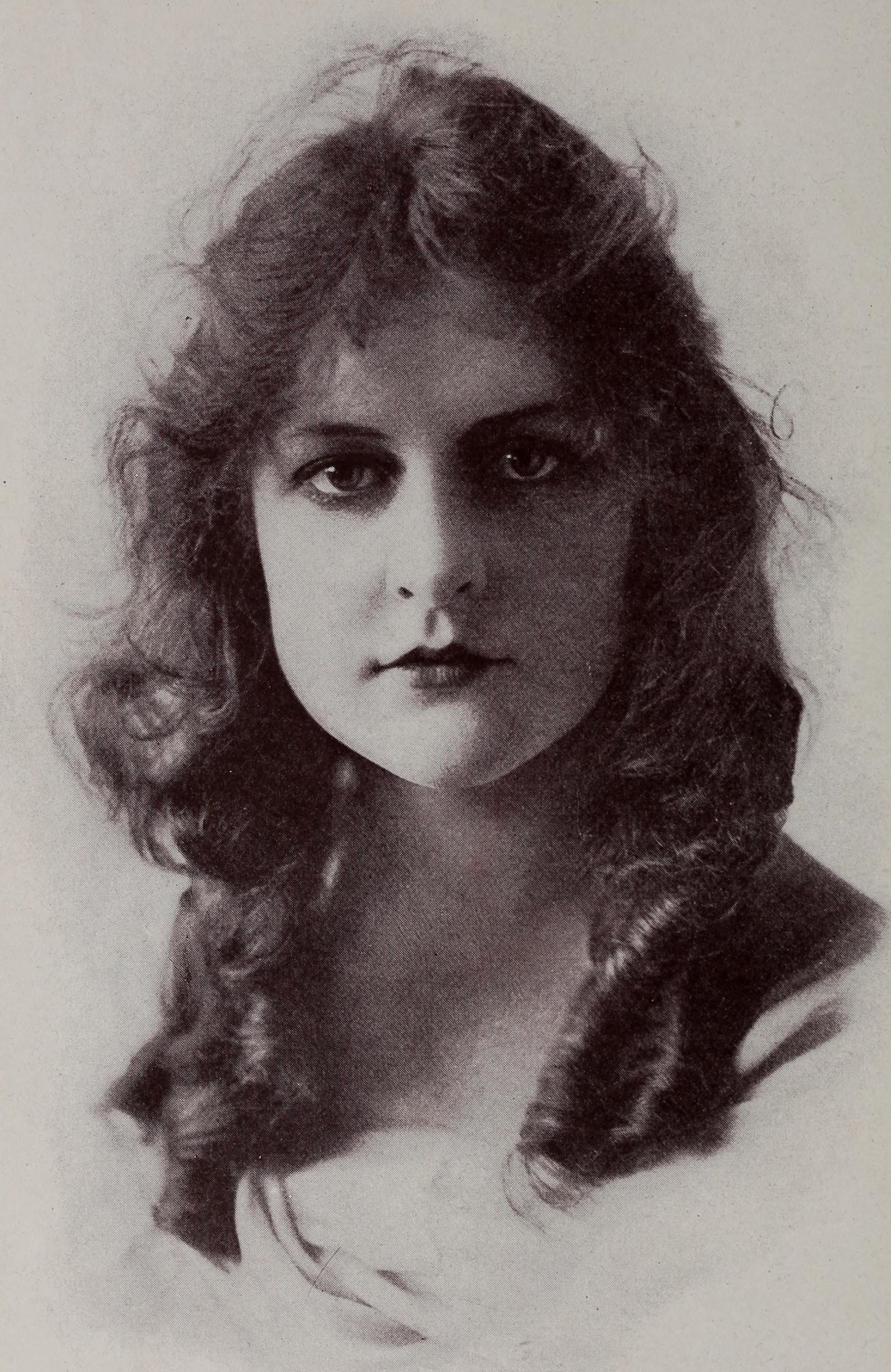
- Motion Picture Magazine 1914
- Born: June 28, 1897; Brooklyn, New York, US
- Died: June 22, 1986 (aged 88); El Cajon, California, US
- Years active: 1914–1923
- Spouse: Pliny Goodfriend (div. 1937)
- Mother: Nellie Anderson

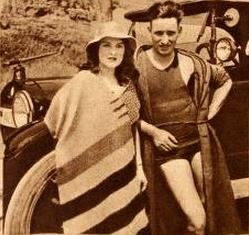
Mary Anderson and husband Pliny Goodfriend (1922)

Mary Anderson (June 28, 1897 – June 22, 1986) was an American actress, who performed in over 77 silent films between 1914 and 1923.

== Career ==
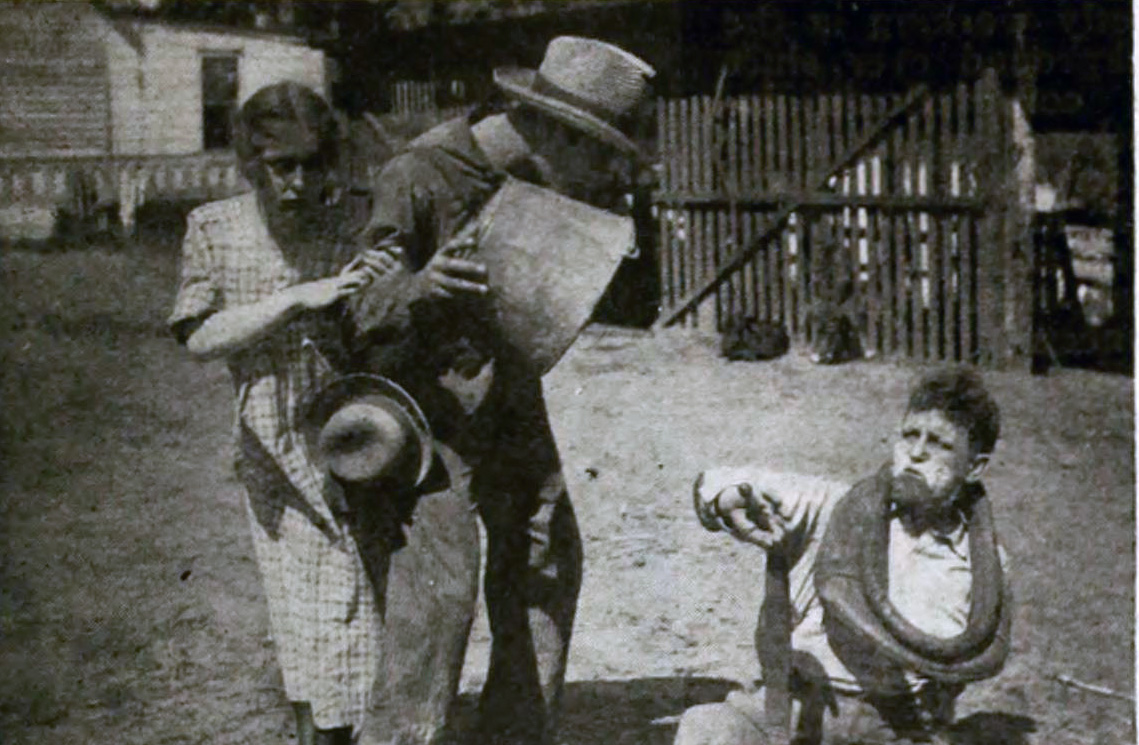
Her Loving Relations (1916)

Anderson was born in Brooklyn, New York, where she also attended Erasmus Hall High School. Anderson later attended Holy Cross School and there made her first public performances as a Grecian dancer at charity functions. Anderson had been seen in many productions since the day she first made her bow on the silver screen for Vitagraph Studios.

A popular player, she probably did her best work in Irvin Willat's feature production, The False Faces (1919), for release through Ince-Paramount. Anderson produced her own film, Bubbles (1920), which had a splendid reception by the public. She was four feet and eleven inches in height and weighed one hundred and five pounds, and had golden hair and blue eyes. She was an expert swimmer.

She later worked for Famous Players–Lasky and Canyon Pictures.

== Personal life/death ==
She was daughter of actress Nellie Anderson. She married cinematographer Pliny Goodfriend but they divorced in 1937. She died in El Cajon, California, six days before her 89th birthday.

== Selected filmography ==
- C.O.D. (1914) Vitagraph Company of America (Broadway Star Feature)
- My Official Wife (1914)
- The Silent Plea film short (1915) Vitagraph Company of America (Broadway Star Feature)
- The Human Caldron film short (1915) Vitagraph Company of America (Broadway Star Feature)
- Cal Marvin's Wife film short (1915) Vitagraph Company of America (Broadway Star Feature)
- The Flower of the Desert (1916) Vitagraph Company of America (Broadway Star Feature)
- Horse Shoe for Luck (1916) Vitagraph Company of America (Broadway Star Feature)
- Her Loving Relations (1916) Vitagraph Company of America (Broadway Star Feature)
- The Last Man (1916)
- The Flaming Omen (1917)
- When Men Are Tempted (1917)
- The Divorcee (1917)
- Sunlight's Last Raid (1917)
- By Right of Possession (1917)
- The Magnificent Meddler (1917)
- The Warning (1917)
- Playthings (1918)
- His Birthright (1918)
- The Hushed Hour (1919)
- The False Faces (1919)
- Johnny Get Your Gun (1919)
- The Spender (1919)
- Bubbles (1920)
- Vanishing Trails (1920)
- Two Minutes to Go (1921)
- Too Much Married (1921)
- Bluebeard, Jr. (1922)
- The Half Breed (1922)
- Wildness of Youth (1922)
- Shell Shocked Sammy (1923)
- Enemies of Children (1923)
