= Otto Lederer =

American actor (1886–1965)

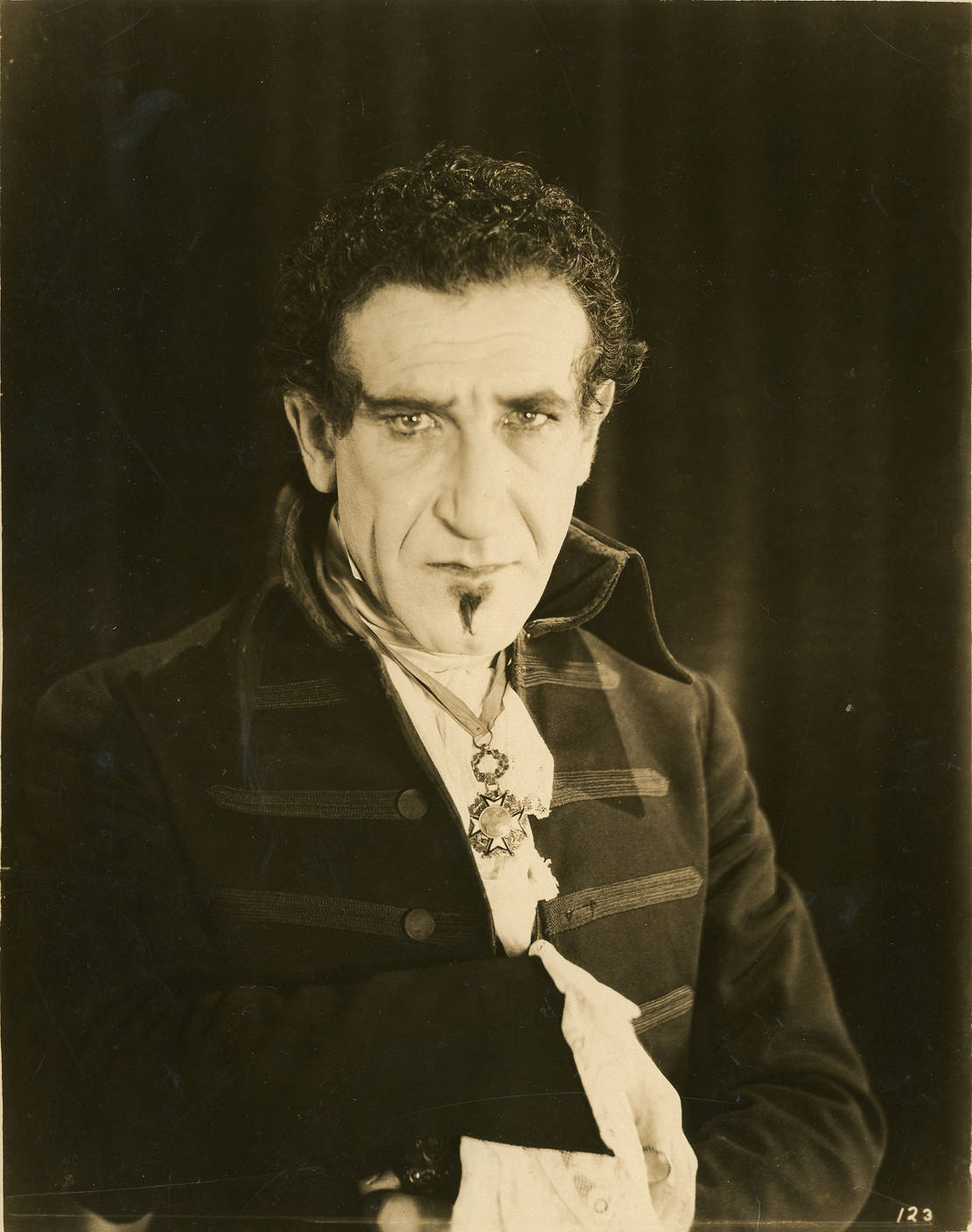
- Lederer in 1925
- Born: May 17, 1886; Prague, Bohemia, Austria-Hungary (now Czech Republic)
- Died: September 3, 1965 (aged 79); Woodland Hills, Los Angeles, U.S.
- Years active: 1912–1933
- Spouses: Segunda Yriondo (m. 1925; div. 1929): Florita Mernci; Gretchen Lederer
- Children: 1

Otto Lederer (May 17, 1886 – September 3, 1965) was a Czech-American film actor. He appeared in 120 films between 1912 and 1933, most notably The Jazz Singer, the first full-length film to have sound sequences, and the Laurel and Hardy short You're Darn Tootin'.

Lederer was born in Prague. In 1925, He married Segunda Yriondo. They were divorced on July 10, 1929. Prior he was married to German actress Gretchen Lederer. Both had a son together (1908–1940). Lederer is entombed at Forest Lawn Memorial Park Cemetery.

== Selected filmography ==
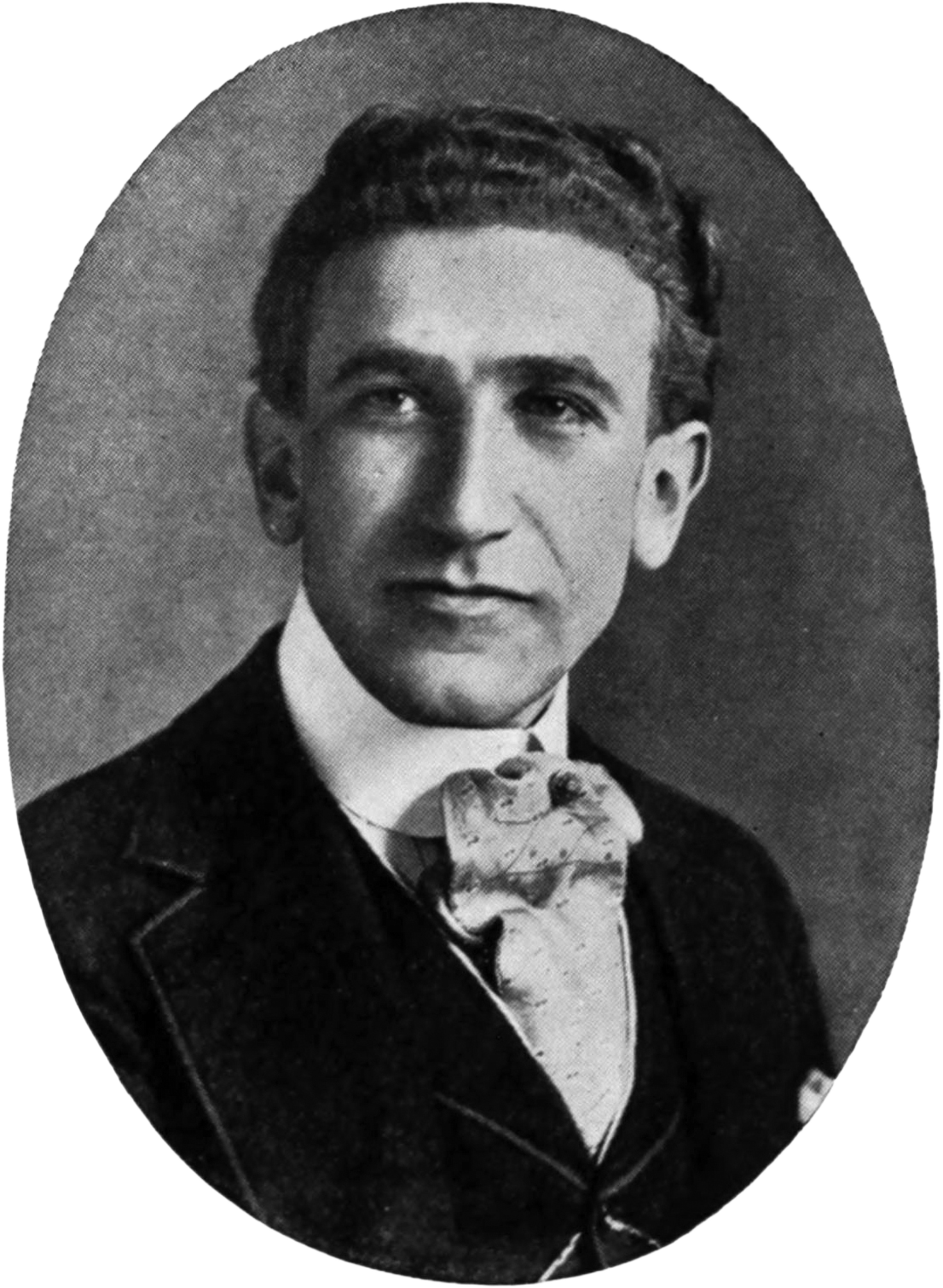
Lederer in Who's Who in the Film World (1914)

- Captain Alvarez (1914)
- A Natural Man (1915)
- Captain of the Gray Horse Troop (1917)
- The Flaming Omen (1917)
- Aladdin from Broadway (1917)
- The Magnificent Meddler (1917)
- By Right of Possession (1917)
- When Men Are Tempted (1917)
- The Changing Woman (1918)
- The Woman in the Web (1918)
- By the World Forgot (1918)
- Cupid Forecloses (1919)
- Over the Garden Wall (1919)
- The Little Boss (1919)
- The Dragon's Net (1920)
- The Spenders (1921)
- The Avenging Arrow (1921)
- Without Benefit of Clergy (1921)
- White Eagle (1922)
- Forget Me Not (1922)
- The Gown Shop (1923)
- Your Friend and Mine (1923)
- The Sword of Valor (1924)
- A Fighting Heart (1924)
- Behind Two Guns (1924)
- Turned Up (1924)
- Virginian Outcast (1924)
- Wizard of Oz (1925)
- Borrowed Finery (1925)
- Cruise of the Jasper B (1926)
- The Trunk Mystery (1926)
- That Model from Paris (1926)
- Sweet Rosie O'Grady (1926)
- The Jazz Singer (1927)
- The King of Kings (1927)
- The Shamrock and the Rose (1927)
- You're Darn Tootin' (1928)
- A Bit of Heaven (1928)
- Celebrity (1928)
- Gun Law (1933)
