= The Flaming Omen =

- Directed by: William Wolbert
- Written by: Andrés de Segurola; William B. Courtney; C. Graham Baker; Jean Bart
- Starring: Gayne Whitman; Mary Anderson; Otto Lederer
- Cinematography: Reginald Lyons
- Production company: Vitagraph Company of America
- Distributed by: Vitagraph Company of America
- Release date: October 29, 1917
- Running time: 50 minutes
- Country: United States
- Languages: Silent; English intertitles

The Flaming Omen is a 1917 American silent drama film directed by William Wolbert and starring Gayne Whitman, Mary Anderson and Otto Lederer.

== Cast ==
- Gayne Whitman as Dorian
- Mary Anderson as Blanca
- Luella Smith as Violet
- Otto Lederer as Lord Haviland
- S.E. Jennings as Natche
- Clara King as Coya

== Bibliography ==
- John T. Weaver. Twenty Years of Silents, 1908-1928. Scarecrow Press, 1971.
