= Sunlight's Last Raid =

1917 film

- Directed by: William Wolbert
- Written by: Cyrus Townsend Brady; Edward J. Montagne
- Produced by: Albert E. Smith
- Starring: Gayne Whitman; Mary Anderson; Vincente Howard
- Cinematography: Reginald Lyons
- Production company: Vitagraph Company of America
- Distributed by: Vitagraph Company of America
- Release date: September 24, 1917
- Running time: 50 minutes
- Country: United States
- Languages: Silent; English intertitles

Sunlight's Last Raid is a 1917 American silent Western film directed by William Wolbert and starring Gayne Whitman, Mary Anderson and Vincente Howard.

== Cast ==
- Mary Anderson as Janet Warned
- Gayne Whitman as Jack Conway
- Vincente Howard as Captain Sunlight
- Fred Burns as Bill Warned
- Al Ernest Garcia as Pedro

== Bibliography ==
- John T. Weaver. Twenty Years of Silents, 1908-1928. Scarecrow Press, 1971.
