= Ruth MacTammany =

American actress

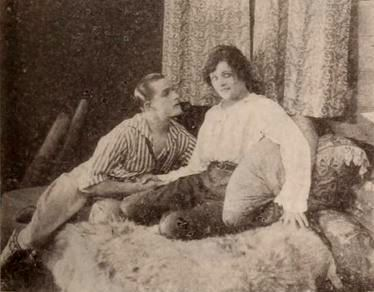
In Alma, Where Do You Live

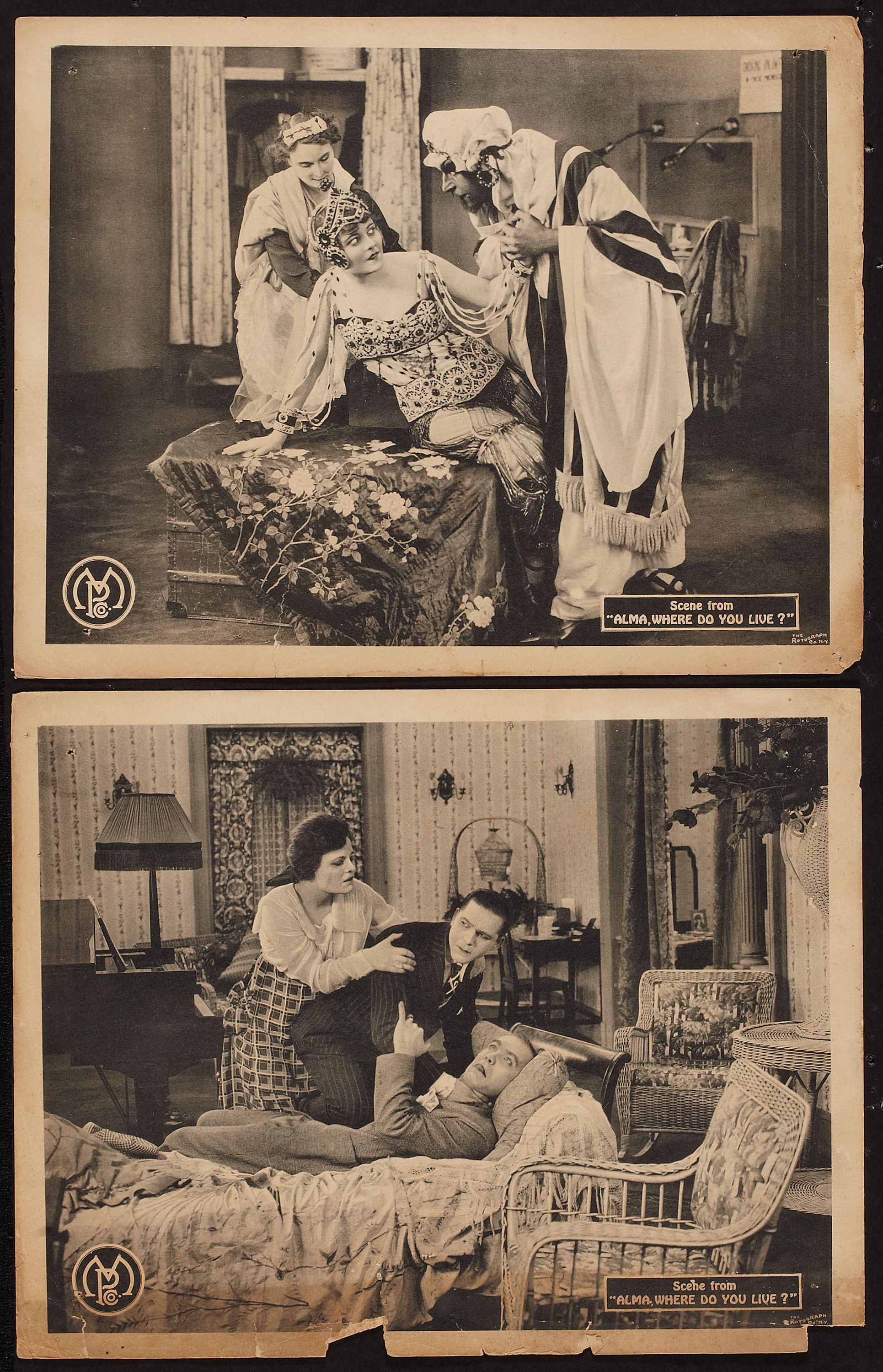

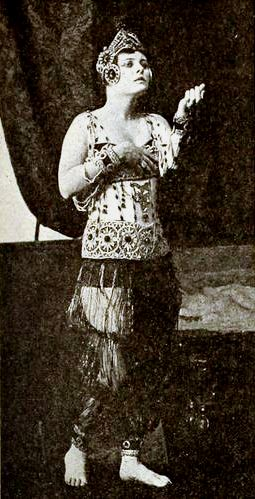

Ruth Jean MacTammany (1892 – 1977), also known as Jeanne Iver and Ruth Rishel, was an actress, singer, and screenwriter from the United States. She had film roles and a film company was named for her.

She was in the 1919 theatrical production The Lady in Red (Broadway show). She was performing in Europe when World War I broke out. She was arrested as a spy but was released and served as an ambulance driver.

== Early life ==
She was born in Akron, Ohio.

== Wartime, marriage, and lawsuit ==
Her wartime experiences were related in newspapers. She married twice.

In a lawsuit she testified that she performed at the Tangier Club, owned by her husband and his family, and that it was a reputable club.

== Filmography ==
- Alma, Where Do You Live? (1917), she wrote the screen adaptation for the film from the play
- One Day (1917 film)
- The Girl From Rectors (1917)
- Where Do You Live? (1917)
