= Gayne Whitman =

American actor (1890–1958)

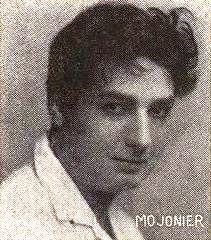
- Whitman in 1916
- Born: Alfred D. Vosburgh; March 19, 1890; Chicago, Illinois
- Died: August 31, 1958 (aged 68); Los Angeles, California
- Other name: Alfred Whitman
- Occupation: Actor
- Years active: 1904-1957
- Spouse: Estelle Margaret Allen (1893-1970)

Gayne Whitman (born Alfred D. Vosburgh; March 19, 1890 – August 31, 1958) was an American radio and film actor. He appeared in more than 200 films between 1904 and 1957. In some early films, he was credited under his birth name.

Whitman was born in Chicago, Illinois on March 19, 1890.

Whitman's theatrical debut came when he carried a spear behind an actor portraying King Richard III in a production in Indianapolis. He acted around the midwestern United States as a member of stock theater companies before going to Hollywood in 1913, shifting his focus to films.

Allen Vosburgh, he was the leading man in the film Princess of the Dark (1917). Soon after that, he changed his screen name to Alfred Whitman because "1917 was not a good time to have a German sounding name."

Beginning in 1921, Whitman acted at the Morosco Theater in Los Angeles. He returned to films in 1925 when he received a contract with Warner Bros.

On radio, Whitman played the title role in Chandu the Magician, was the narrator on Lassie and Strange as It Seems, and was an announcer on Paducah Plantation and other programs.

== Personal life ==
Whitman was married to Estelle Taylor, an actress with a stock theater company in St. Louis. (Another source gives her name as Estelle Allen.) They had two daughters. On August 31, 1958, Whitman died of a heart attack in Los Angeles at age 68.

== Selected filmography ==
- A Natural Man (1915, Short) - Karl Holden
- The Substitute Minister (1915, Short) - John Drummond
- The Bluffers (1915, Short) - Tom Murdock
- The Silver Lining (1915, Short) - Richard Grant
- The Solution to the Mystery (1915, Short) - Franklyn Davis
- The Red Circle (1915, Serial)
- Matching Dreams (1916, Short) - Hugh Clayton
- Time and Tide (1916, Short) - Ned Lang
- A Sanitarium Scramble (1916, Short) - Frank Fellows
- Tangled Skeins (1916, Short) - Randall Wellington
- Her Father's Son (1916) - Lt. Richard Harkness
- The Road to Love (1916) - Karan
- The Serpent's Tooth (1917)
- Princess of the Dark (1917)
- Money Madness (1917)
- The Divorcee (1917)
- Sunlight's Last Raid (1917)
- The Flaming Omen (1917)
- When Men Are Tempted (1917)
- Baree, Son of Kazan (1918)
- The Sea Flower (1918)
- Desert Law (1918)
- The End of the Game (1919)
- His Majesty, Bunker Bean (1925)
- The Wife Who Wasn't Wanted (1925)
- Three Weeks in Paris {1925}
- A Woman of the Sea (1926)
- Oh! What a Nurse! (1926)
- Hell-Bent for Heaven (1926)
- Sunshine of Paradise Alley (1926)
- The Love Toy (1926)
- The Night Cry (1926)
- Exclusive Rights (1926)
- A Woman's Heart (1926)
- The Woman on Trial (1927)
- Wolves of the Air (1927)
- Stolen Pleasures (1927)
- Backstage (1927)
- In the First Degree (1927)
- Sailors' Wives (1928)
- Lucky Boy (1929)
- Reno (1930)
- Finger Prints (1931)
- Heroes of the Flames (1931)
- Igloo (1932)
- The Sea (1933)
- Art Trouble (1934) short film
- Born to Die (1934) narrator educational short
- Flight Command (1940)
- The Rookie Bear (1941)
- Barney Bear's Victory Garden (1942)
- War Dogs (1943)
- The Masked Marvel (1943)
- The Sickle or the Cross (1949)
