= Who Was the Other Man? =

- Directed by: Francis Ford
- Written by: Jessie Lowe; William Parker
- Starring: Francis Ford; Duke Worne; William T. Horne
- Production company: Universal Pictures
- Distributed by: Universal Pictures
- Release date: September 3, 1917
- Running time: 50 minutes
- Country: United States
- Languages: Silent; English intertitles

Who Was the Other Man? is a 1917 American silent war drama film directed by Francis Ford and starring Ford, Duke Worne and William T. Horne.

== Cast ==
- Francis Ford as James Walbert / Ludwig Schumann
- Duke Worne as Herbert Cornell
- William T. Horne as Sen. Washburn
- Beatrice Van as Wanda Bartell
- Mae Gaston as Marion Washburn

== Bibliography ==
- Scott Eyman. Print the Legend: The Life and Times of John Ford. Simon and Schuster, 2012.
