= When Men Are Tempted =

- Directed by: William Wolbert
- Written by: George H. Plympton
- Starring: Gayne Whitman; Mary Anderson; Otto Lederer
- Cinematography: Reginald Lyons
- Production company: Vitagraph Company of America
- Distributed by: Vitagraph Company of America
- Release date: December 24, 1917
- Running time: 50 minutes
- Country: United States
- Languages: Silent; English intertitles

When Men Are Tempted is a 1917 American silent drama film directed by William Wolbert and starring Mary Anderson, Gayne Whitman and Robert N. Bradbury.

== Cast ==
- Mary Anderson as Jessie Garden
- Gayne Whitman as John Burt
- Robert N. Bradbury as Peter Burt
- Otto Lederer as General Garden
- S.E. Jennings as Kinsley

== Bibliography ==
- John T. Weaver. Twenty Years of Silents, 1908-1928. Scarecrow Press, 1971.
