= Outcast =

Outcast(s) or Outkast most often refers to:

- Outcast (person), with social stigma or untouchability

Outcast(s) or Outkast may also refer to:

== Literature ==
- The Outcasts (play), 1884, by Ivan Vazov
- The Outcast (Pirandello novel), 1901, by Luigi Pirandello
- Outcast (Sutcliff novel), 1955 children's novel by Rosemary Sutcliff
- Outcasts (DC Comics), 1987 comic book series by John Wagner and Cam Kennedy
- Outcast (Ballas novel), 1991 book by Iraqi-Israeli author Shimon Ballas
- The Outcast (Hawke novel), 1993, by Simon Hawke
- Outcast (magazine), 1999-2001 queer magazine in the UK
- The Outcast (anthology), 2006 short story collection published by the Canberra Speculative Fiction Guild
- Outcast (Paver novel), 2007 book by Michelle Paver
- The Outcast (Jones novel), 2007, by Sadie Jones
- Outcast by Kirkman and Azaceta, 2014 comic book
- The Outcast, 1875 novel by William Winwood Reade
- The Outcast: A Rhyme for the Time, 1891 poem by Robert Williams Buchanan
- The Outcasts, 1901 novel by W. A. Fraser
- Outcast, a 1914 play by Hubert Henry Davies
- The Outcast, a 1929 illustrated pamphlet of poetry by James Stephens for Faber
- The Outcast (Swedish: Bannlyst), a 1955 novel by Selma Lagerlöf
- The Outcasts, a 1959 novel by Will Cook
- The Outcasts, a 1962 novel by Edith Sitwell
- The Outcasts, a 1965 novel by Daniel P. Mannix
- Outcasts, a 1981 novel by Joe L. Hensley
- The Outcast, a 1986 novel by Louise Cooper
- The Outcast, a 1987 young-adult novel by Patricia Bernard
- Outcast, a 1987 novel by Francine Pascal, the 41st installment in the Sweet Valley High series
- The Outcast, a 1998 novel by Cynthia Harrod-Eagles, the 21st installment in The Morland Dynasty series
- The Outcast, a 1999 novel by Lauran Paine
- The Outcasts, a 2004 novel by L. S. Matthews
- Outcast, a 2005 novel by Lynne Ewing, the third installment in the Sons of the Dark series
- The Outcast, 2005 book of Guardians of Ga'Hoole series
- The Outcast, 2007 manga published by Seven Seas Entertainment
- Outcast, 2008 novel in the Warriors: Power of Three series by Erin Hunter
- The Outcast, 2008 novel by Sadie Jones
- Outcast, 2009, first book in the Star Wars: Fate of the Jedi series, by Aaron Allston
- The Outcasts, 2011 novel in the Brotherband series by John Flanagan
- Outcaste (2017), sixth book in Fletcher DeLancey's Chronicles of Alsea series
- Outcasts, various comic book characters in Marvel Comics; see list of Marvel Comics teams and organizations

== Music ==
=== Albums ===
- Outcast (Kreator album), 1997
- Outcast (Ektomorf album), 2006
- Outcasts (Freak of Nature album), compilation
- Outcasts (Palisades album), 2013

=== Songs ===
- "Outcast", a 1964 single by Eddie & Ernie, covered by The Animals on the album Animalisms
- "Outcast", the fourth movement of Mike Oldfield's Tubular Bells III
- "The Outcast", a song from Dropkick Murphys album Blackout
- "Outcast", a song by Kerrie Roberts on the 2010 album Kerrie Roberts
- "Outcast", a song by NF on the 2017 album Perception
- "Outcast", a song by Gen Hoshino on the 2023 EP Lighthouse
- "Outcast", an original song sung by the New Directions in Season 4 of Glee

=== Performers ===
- Outkast, an American hip hop duo based in East Point, Georgia
- The Outcasts (Belfast band), a punk band from Belfast formed in the 1970s
- The Outcasts (Texas band), a 1960s American band from Texas
- The Outcast Band, English alternative rock band
- Outcast, signed to Listenable Records, France
- The Outcasts, a 1960s band from Manhasset, New York, whose recordings were reissued by Cicadelic (Collectables)
- The Outcasts, a 1960s band that became Gary Puckett & The Union Gap
- Outcast, duo of Richard Brown and Beaumont Hannant

== Television ==
=== Episodes ===
- "The Outcast" (Star Trek: The Next Generation), 1992 episode
- "Outcast", Hercules: The Legendary Journeys season 2, episode 5 (1995)
- "Outcast", Maria Clara at Ibarra episode 35 (2022)
- "Outcast", Stargate Atlantis season 4, episode 15 (2008)
- "Outcast", Too Cute Crisis episode 9 (2023)
- "Outcast", The Vice series 5, episode 4 (2006)
- "Outcast", The Virginian season 5, episode 7 (1966)
- "Outcasts", Mako: Island of Secrets season 1, episode 1 (2013)
- "Outcasts", Taboo (2002) season 3, episode 1 (2004)
- "OutKast" (Lanterns), Lanterns season 1, episode 3 (2026)
- "The Outcast", Bonanza season 1, episode 17 (1960)
- "The Outcast", Danger Man series 3, episode 8 (1965)
- "The Outcast", I.N.K. Invisible Network of Kids episode 8 (2009)
- "The Outcast!", Kana Kaanum Kaalangal season 2, episode 14 (2023)
- "The Outcast", Lassie (1954) season 12, episode 20 (1966)
- "The Outcast", Lawman season 1, episode 5 (1958)
- "The Outcast", Matlock season 6, episodes 14–15 (1992)
- "The Outcast", Medical Center season 4, episode 10 (1972)
- "The Outcast", The Adventures of Black Beauty series 2, episode 3 (1973)
- "The Outcast", The Adventures of Sir Lancelot episode 4 (1956)
- "The Outcast", The Colbys season 1, episode 17 (1986)
- "The Outcast", The F.B.I. season 8, episode 14 (1972)
- "The Outcast", The Lone Ranger season 2, episode 19 (1951)
- "The Outcast", The Ping Pong Club episode 15a (1995)
- "The Outcasts", Falcon Crest season 4, episode 4 (1984)
- "The Outcasts", Mr. Belvedere season 1, episode 2 (1985)
- "The Outcasts", Royal Blood episode 22 (2023)
- "The Outcasts", Stagecoach West episode 22 (1961)
- "The Outcasts", Strike Force episode 8 (1982)
- "The Outcasts", Thief Takers series 1, episode 7 (1996)

=== Shows ===
- Outcasts (TV series), a BBC sci-fi series broadcast in 2011
- Outcast (TV series), a 2016 Cinemax adaptation of the 2014 comic book written by Robert Kirkman
- The Outcast (British TV series), a 2015 British two-part TV adaptation by Sadie Jones of her novel of the same name
- The Outcasts (American TV series), a 1968–1969 American Western television series that aired on ABC
- The Outcasts (Australian TV series), a 1961 Australian period-drama television serial

== Film ==
- Outcast (1917 film), an American silent film directed by Dell Henderson and starring Ann Murdock
- Outcast (1922 film), a silent film starring Elsie Ferguson based on 1915 Broadway hit that starred Ferguson
- Outcast (1928 film), a remake of the 1922 film with sound sequences; starring Corinne Griffith
- The Outcast (1934 film), a British film directed by Norman Lee
- Outcast (1937 film), directed by Robert Florey
- The Outcast (1954 film), a Western film starring John Derek
- The Outcasts (1982 film), an Irish film starring Mary Ryan
- Outcasts, 1986 film based on the novel Crystal Boys
- Outkast (film), 2001, by Chico Ejiro
- The Outcasts (2007 film), an Iranian film, written and directed by Masoud Dehnamaki
- Outcast (2010 film), starring James Nesbitt
- Outcast (2014 film), starring Nicolas Cage and Hayden Christensen
- The Outcasts (2017 film), an American teen comedy directed by Peter Hutchings

== Places ==
- Outcast Hill, a hill in British Columbia, Canada
- Outcast Islands, two small islands near Antarctica
- Outcast Islands (Nunavut), Canada

== Other uses ==
- Outcast, a British WW2 double agent involved earlier with the Zinoviev letter
- The Outcasts (Star Trek: The Role Playing Game), a 1985 role-playing game adventure
- Outcast (video game), a 1999 action-adventure computer game by Infogrames
- The Outcast (Redgrave painting), an 1851 oil painting by Victorian artist Richard Redgrave
- The Outcasts (professional wrestling), a wrestling stable
