= Outcast Islands (disambiguation) =

Outcast Islands may refer to:

- Outcast Islands, in the Palmer Archipelago of Antarctica
- Outcast Islands (Nunavut), Canada

== See also ==
- Outcast of the Islands, a 1951 film
- An Outcast of the Islands, an 1896 novel by Joseph Conrad
