= Outcasts (comics) =

Outcasts or Outcast, in comics, may refer to:

- Outcasts (DC Comics), a series by John Wagner and Alan Grant
- Outcasts, several different characters published in Marvel Comics, see list of Marvel Comics teams and organizations
- Outcast by Kirkman and Azaceta, a 2014 comic book
- The Outcast, an original English-language manga published by Seven Seas Entertainment

== See also ==
- Outcast (disambiguation)
