= Book of Thoth =

Name given to many ancient Egyptian texts

Book of Thoth is a name given to many ancient Egyptian texts attributed to Thoth, the Egyptian god of writing and knowledge. They include many texts that were mentioned by ancient authors including a magical book that appears in an ancient Egyptian story.

In ancient Egypt, all books were considered to have been written by Thoth because of his role as the god of writing. Iamblichus explained that it was only natural that Egyptian priests should attribute all their writings to Thoth as homage for his being the source of all knowledge.

For this reason Thoth is considered the author of The Book Of Coming Forth By Day also known as The Book Of The Dead.

The Book of Thoth is mentioned in the oldest inscription on the sarcophagus of the Imamy with a quote from chapter 68 of the "Book of the Dead", as well as on the sarcophagus of Sobek.: "You (Imamy) are sitting under the branches of a fig tree near Hathor in front of a wide sun disk when she goes to Heleopolis, with the writing of the word of God in the book of Thoth."

The Christian Church Father Clement of Alexandria, in the sixth book of his work Stromata, mentions forty-two books used by Egyptian priests that he says contain "the whole philosophy of the Egyptians". All these books, according to Clement, were written by Hermes (a Greek god that the Greeks likened to Thoth, claiming they were the same god, having similar qualities, e.g. both invented writing). Translation from Egyptian language and concepts to Greek language and concepts was not entirely accurate, and some Egyptian authenticity was lost. Among the subjects they cover are hymns, rituals, temple construction, astrology, geography, and medicine.

The Egyptologists Richard Lewis Jasnow and Karl-Theodor Zauzich have dubbed a long Egyptian text from the Ptolemaic period "The Ancient Egyptian Book of Thoth". This Demotic text, known from more than forty fragmentary copies, consists of a dialogue between a person called "The-one-who-loves-knowledge" and a figure that Jasnow and Zauzich identify as Thoth. The topics of their conversation include the work of scribes, various aspects of the gods and their sacred animals, and the Duat, the realm of the dead.

== In ancient Egyptian stories ==
The Book of Thoth, said to contain "all knowledge of laws, magic, nature and the afterlife" appears in a demotic Ptolemaic papyrus which tells of Setne Khaemwaset and Neferkaptah. The book, written by Thoth, contains two spells, one of which allows the reader to understand the speech of animals, and one of which allows the reader to perceive the gods themselves.

According to the story, the book was originally hidden at the bottom of the Nile near Coptos, where it was locked inside a series of boxes guarded by serpents. The Egyptian prince Neferkaptah fought the serpents and retrieved the book, but in punishment for his theft from Thoth, the gods killed his wife Ahwere and son Merab. Neferkaptah committed suicide and was entombed along with the book. Generations later, the story's protagonist, Setne Khaemwaset (a character based on the historical prince Khaemwaset), steals the book from Neferkaptah's tomb despite opposition from Neferkaptah's ghost. Setne then meets a beautiful woman who seduces him into killing his children and humiliating himself in front of the pharaoh. He discovers that this episode was an illusion created by Neferkaptah, and in fear of further retribution, Setne returns the book to Neferkaptah's tomb. At Neferkaptah's request, Setne also finds the bodies of Neferkaptah's wife and son and buries them in Neferkaptah's tomb, which is then sealed.

The story reflects the Egyptian belief that the gods' knowledge is not meant for humans to possess.

== In popular culture ==
The Book of Thoth is often featured in fiction with Egyptian or supernatural themes. Novels that do so include Brood of the Witch-Queen (1918) Tales of Ancient Egypt by Michael Rosen additional auth. Roger Lancelyn Green(Jan 5, 2016) by Sax Rohmer; Moses, Man of the Mountain (1938) by Zora Neale Hurston; Mumbo Jumbo (1972) by Ishmael Reed; The Rosetta Key (2008) by William Dietrich; and The Serpent's Shadow (2012) by Rick Riordan. The Book plays a role in Henry H. Neff's juvenile fantasy series The Tapestry, Lisa Maxwell's young adult series The Last Magician, and Lynne Ewing's young adult series Sisters of Isis.

The "Book of Thoth" is mentioned in several stories by H. P. Lovecraft, most notably "Through the Gates of the Silver Key", where it is linked with Yog-Sothoth, an alien entity worshiped by sages and magicians.

The Book of Thoth also appears in video games. For example, it is a side-quest element in Shin Megami Tensei: Strange Journey. In both the multi-player online battle arena Smite and Board Game Online, the Book of Thoth is a usable item. In Sid Meier's Civilization VI, it is present as a holy relic that generates faith and tourism. In The Fool's Errand, it represents the overarching meta-puzzle that must be unlocked and solved to complete the game.

In the third arc of the manga (and anime) JoJo's Bizarre Adventure, the antagonist Boingo's supernatural ability is named Thoth and takes the form of a fortune-telling comic book whose premonitions appear as illustrations on its initially-blank pages.

In the Japanese novel (and anime) Myriad Colors Phantom World, the protagonist has an ability called "The Book of Thoth".

The Book of Toth and the tomb of Nefer-Ka-Ptah also are animated in the short film The riddle of the Sphinx, directed by the Ukraïnian director Vladimir Pekar (1985).

The Book of Toth is mentioned in the second season of American Gods, episode 3 "Muninn" (2019).

== See also ==
- Etteilla, who originally described tarot cards as pages from the Book of Thoth
- Emerald Tablet
