= Bembine Tablet =

Bronze tablet of Egyptian Hieroglyphs

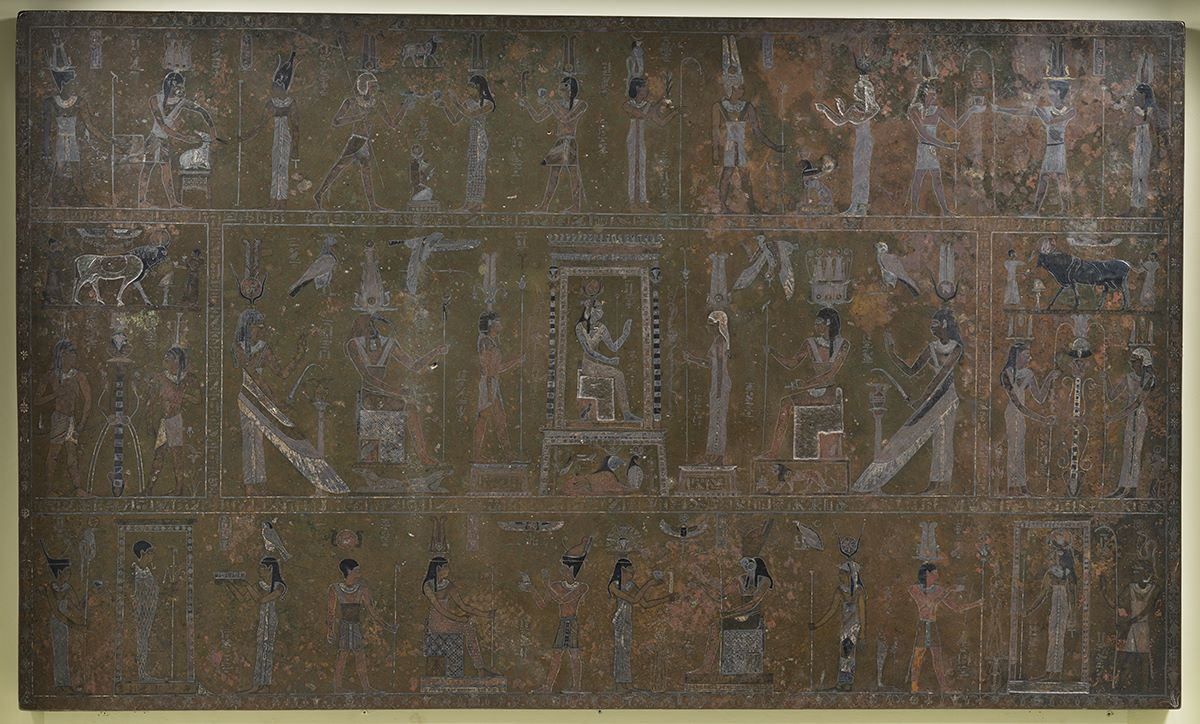
The Bembine Tablet of Isis (Mensa Isiaca). Museo Egizio, Turin (inv. C. 7155).

The Bembine Tablet, the Bembine Table of Isis or the Mensa Isiaca (Isiac Tablet) is an elaborate tablet of bronze with enamel and silver inlay, most probably of Roman origin but imitating the ancient Egyptian style. It was named in the Renaissance after Cardinal Bembo, a celebrated antiquarian who acquired it after the 1527 sack of Rome. Thereafter it was used by antiquarians to penetrate the meaning of Egyptian hieroglyphs, which were not authentically deciphered until the 19th century. Owing to these prior misconceptions, the tablet became of importance to western esoteric traditions.

== Origin and construction ==
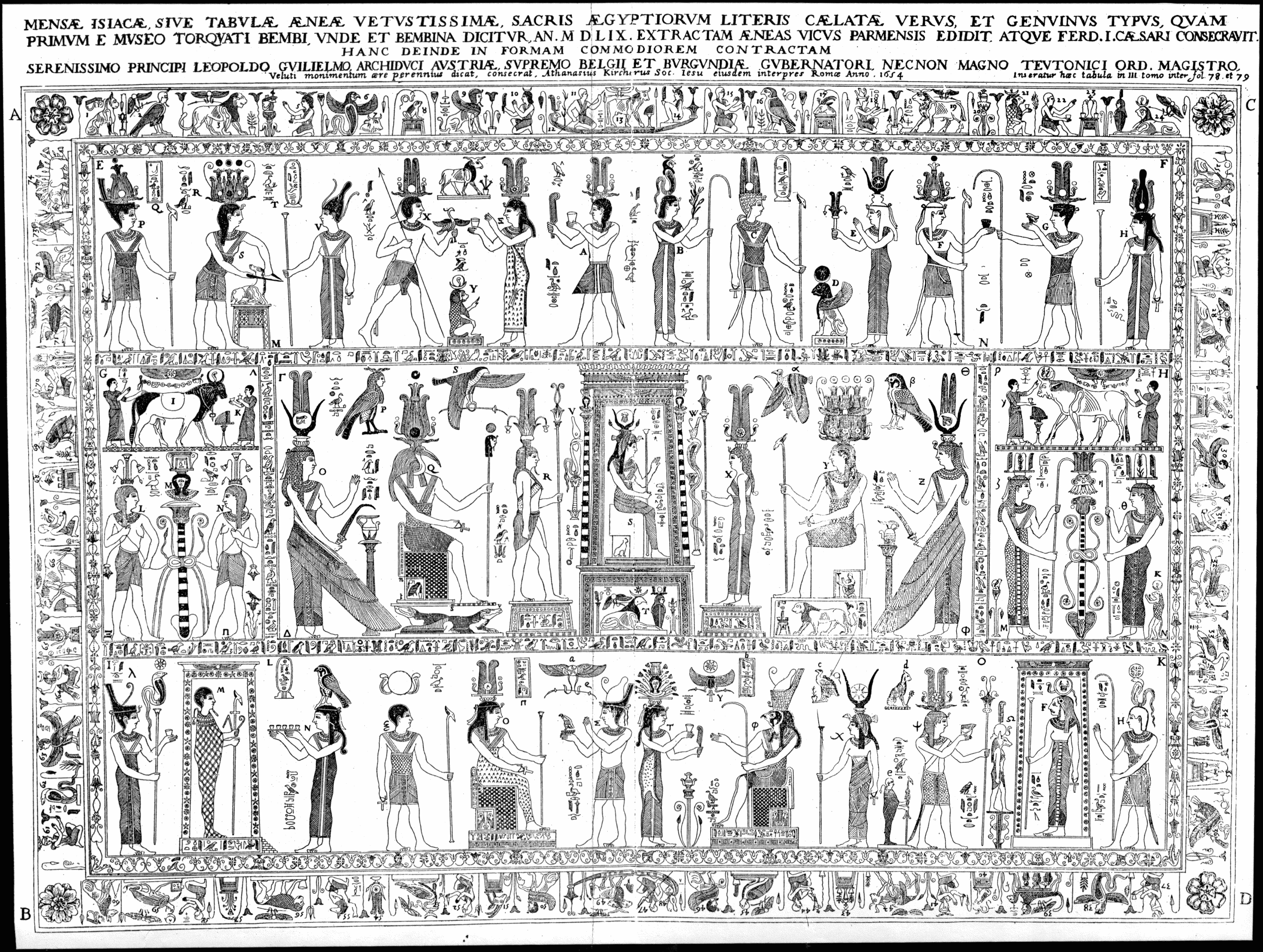
The Bembine Table of Isis (1654 engraving)

The Tablet is now regarded as of Roman rather than Egyptian origin, dating to some time in the first century CE. Little is known of its subsequent history until after the sack of Rome in 1527, when Cardinal Bembo acquired it from a certain locksmith or ironworker into whose hands it had fallen. After Bembo's death in 1547, the Tablet was acquired by the Gonzaga rulers of Mantua, remaining in their museum until the capture of the city in 1630 by Ferdinand II's troops. It then passed through various hands until the French conquest of Italy in 1797. Alexandre Lenoir mentioned in 1809 that it was on exhibition in the Bibliothèque Nationale. After Napoleon's downfall it was returned to Italy to become a central exhibit in what is now the Museo Egizio at Turin, where it has remained.

The tablet was made of bronze with enamel and silver inlay, the figures cut very shallow and the contours of most of them delineated with thin silver wire. The bases on which the figures sat were covered with silver, later torn away, and these sections are left blank in the engraved reproduction above. It is an important example of ancient metallurgy, its surface being decorated with a variety of metals including silver, gold, copper-gold alloy and various base metals. One of the metals employed is black, made by alloying copper and tin with small amounts of gold and silver, and then "pickling" it in organic acid. This black metal is possibly a variety of the "Corinthian bronze" described by Pliny and Plutarch.

== Description ==
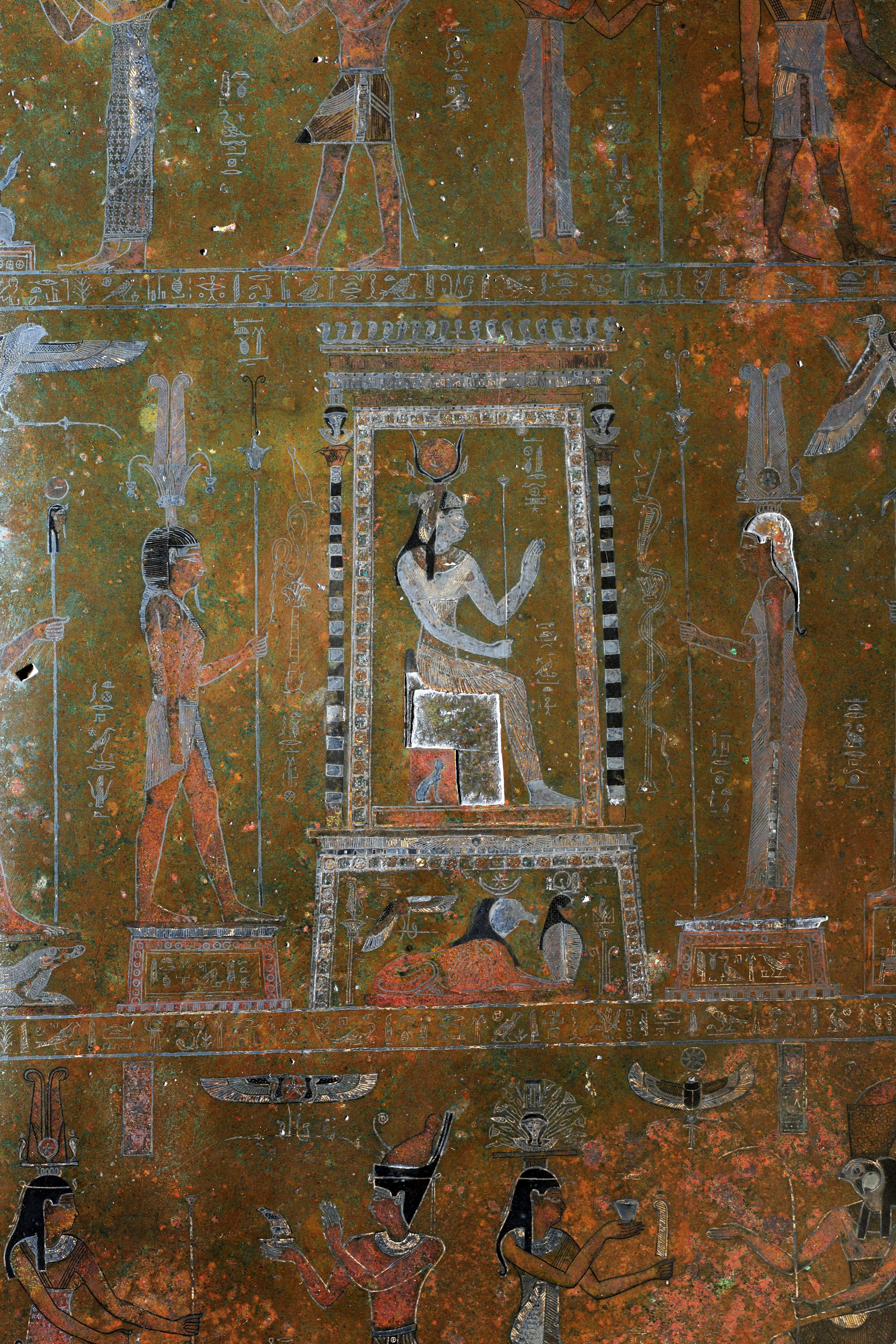
Detail with the central enthroned figure (Isis)

The tablet is a rectangular bronze plate with rich inlays of metals of different colors, forming figures inspired by Ancient Egyptian art and inscriptions imitating hieroglyphs. The surface is bounded by a continuous vertical rim; on the back there is a turned edge that creates a U-shaped channel, with a series of holes along the long side. The base plate measures about 74 × 123 cm and the rim is about 6 cm high. The overall dimensions of the object are 125.5 × 75.5 × 5.5 cm. The thickness of the metal varies significantly (thinner at the center and thicker at the margins), with measured values between about 6 and 17 mm.

The piece was made using direct lost-wax casting, with multiple pours to cover the entire surface; the substrate was then prepared with cavities at different depths to receive the inlays. The figures and motifs are outlined with very thin metal wires, in a dark alloy (“black bronze”) or silver, with average thicknesses on the order of 0.5–0.7 mm. Non-invasive analyses (optical microscopy, XRF, MA-XRF, and radiography) identified at least seven different alloys between the base and the inlays: silver, a dark alloy called “black bronze” (copper with small percentages of gold and tin), and several copper-based alloys with zinc and/or tin, selected to obtain chromatic effects. In particular, skin tones were rendered with a copper-rich alloy for red (used for male figures) and with zinc-containing alloys for yellow, orange, or brown hues (used for female figures, some male figures, and the two deities of the Nile). Frames and pseudo-hieroglyphic “scripts” are traced with straight lines incised directly into the bronze and filled with metal, keeping very regular distances between the lines.

There are also historical interventions and replacements: in some areas the original dark alloy (“black bronze”) or the silver of the inlays has been replaced with materials containing lead; in specific areas mercury-amalgam gilding was detected, indicating later repairs.

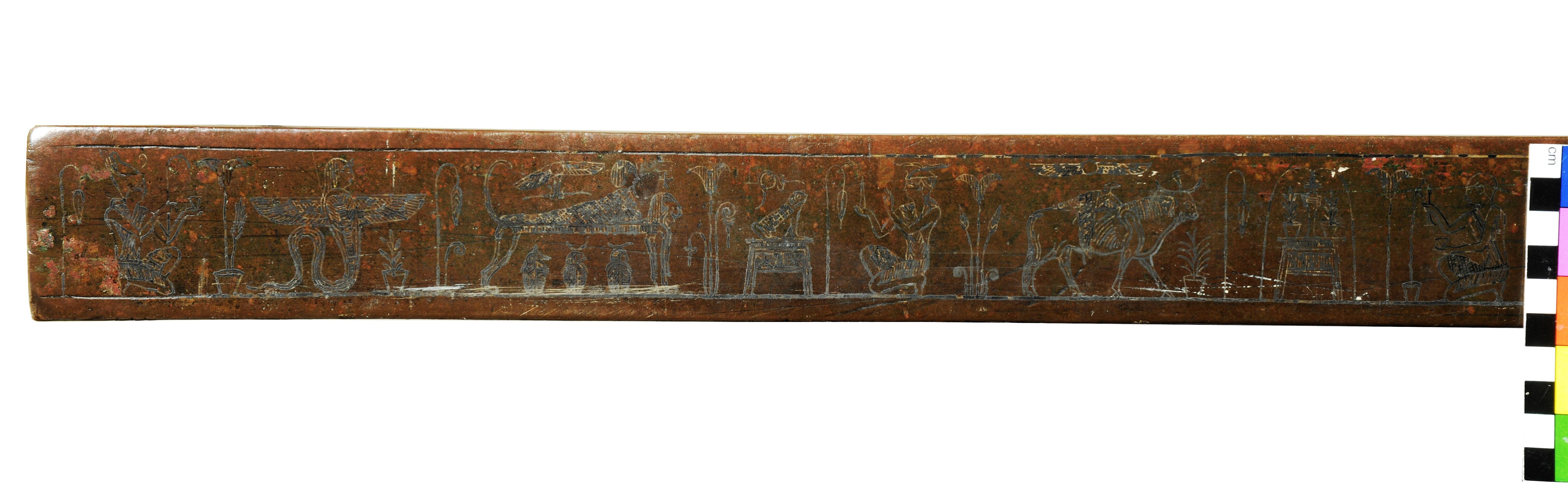
Decorated border

=== Depicted scenes ===
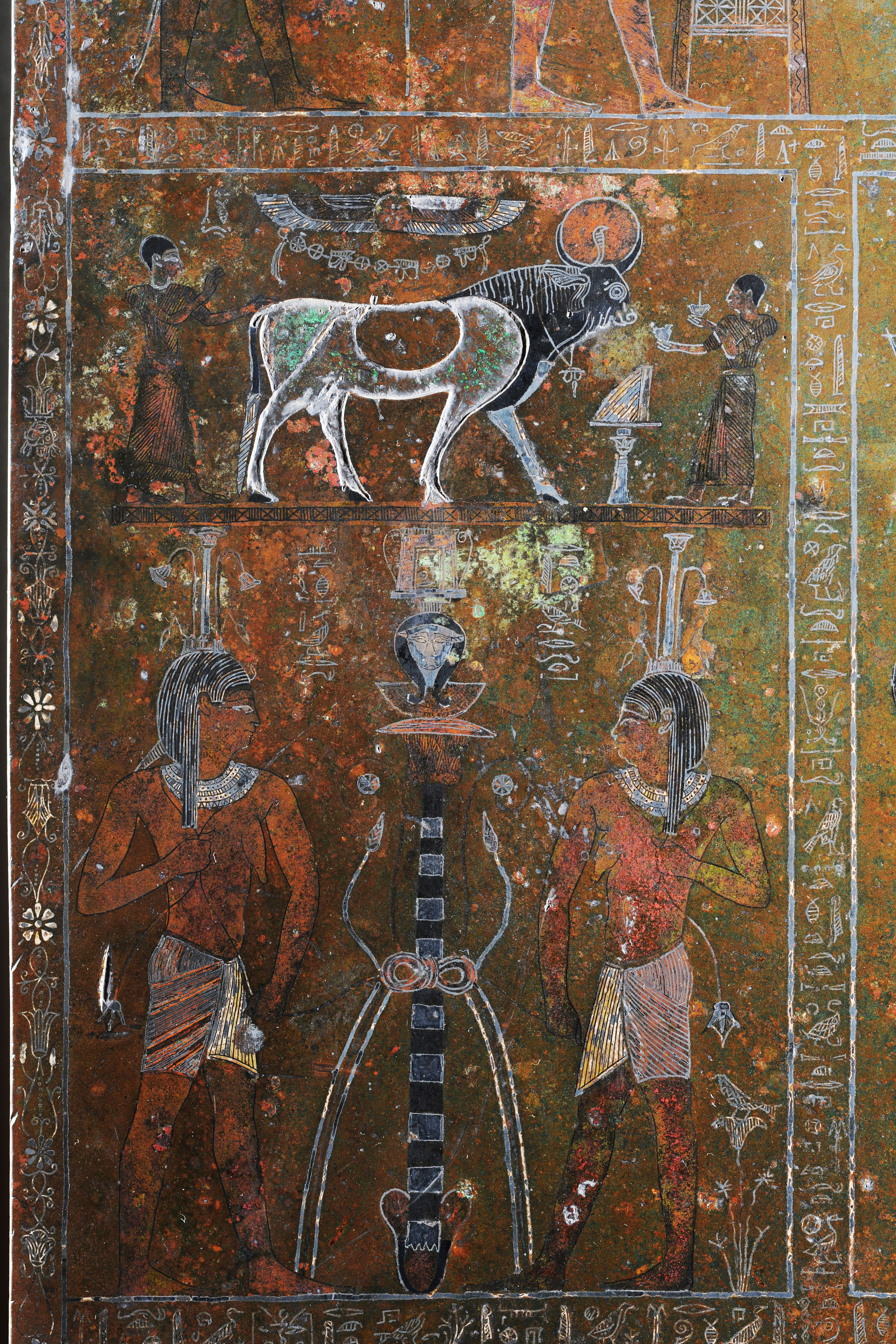
Detail. Above: offering scene to the goddess Hathor (cow associated with a solar disk). Below: two Nile deities with vegetal elements (papyrus clumps).

Even though the scene is of Egyptian type, it does not illustrate Egyptian rites. The figures are shown with unusual attributes, making it difficult to identify which are deities and which are kings or queens. Egyptian motifs are used decoratively, without a real sense or rationale. However, the central figure, seated on a throne inside a temple, is recognizable as the goddess Isis. The surface is organized into five main scenes separated by metal frames; between the scenes are inscriptions inspired by hieroglyphs arranged in columns and rows. Among the larger figures, according to the nomenclature adopted in recent studies, can be identified Isis (C-8), Horus (E-10) and Thoth (C-3), seated on thrones decorated with grids and two-tone inlays. There is also a scene with two Nile deities accompanied by vegetal elements such as papyrus clumps. Hairstyles and wigs are often rendered with “black bronze” and small silver inserts in lines or braids; collars and other ornaments combine silver and dark bronze according to repeated schemes.

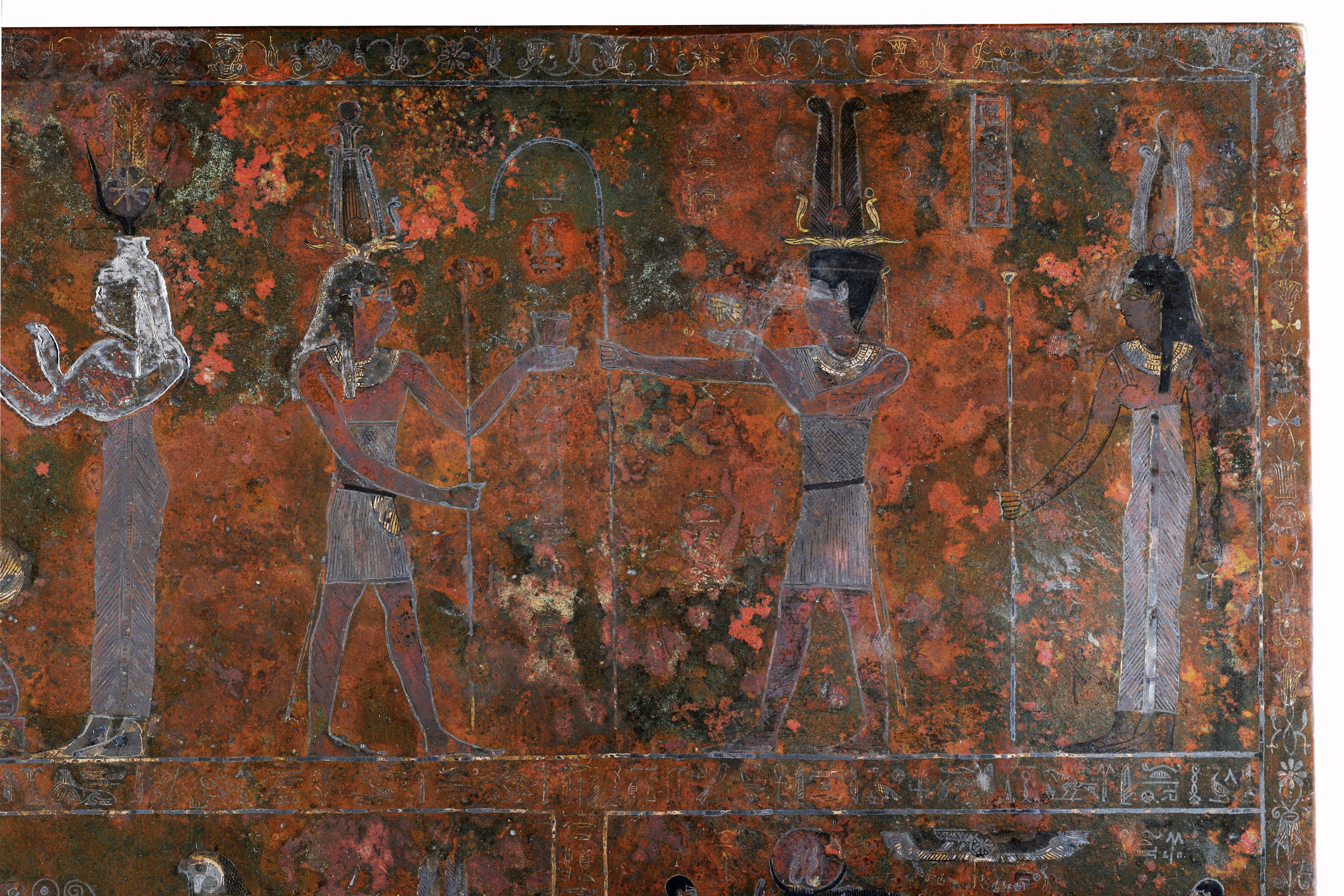
Detail with crowned figures

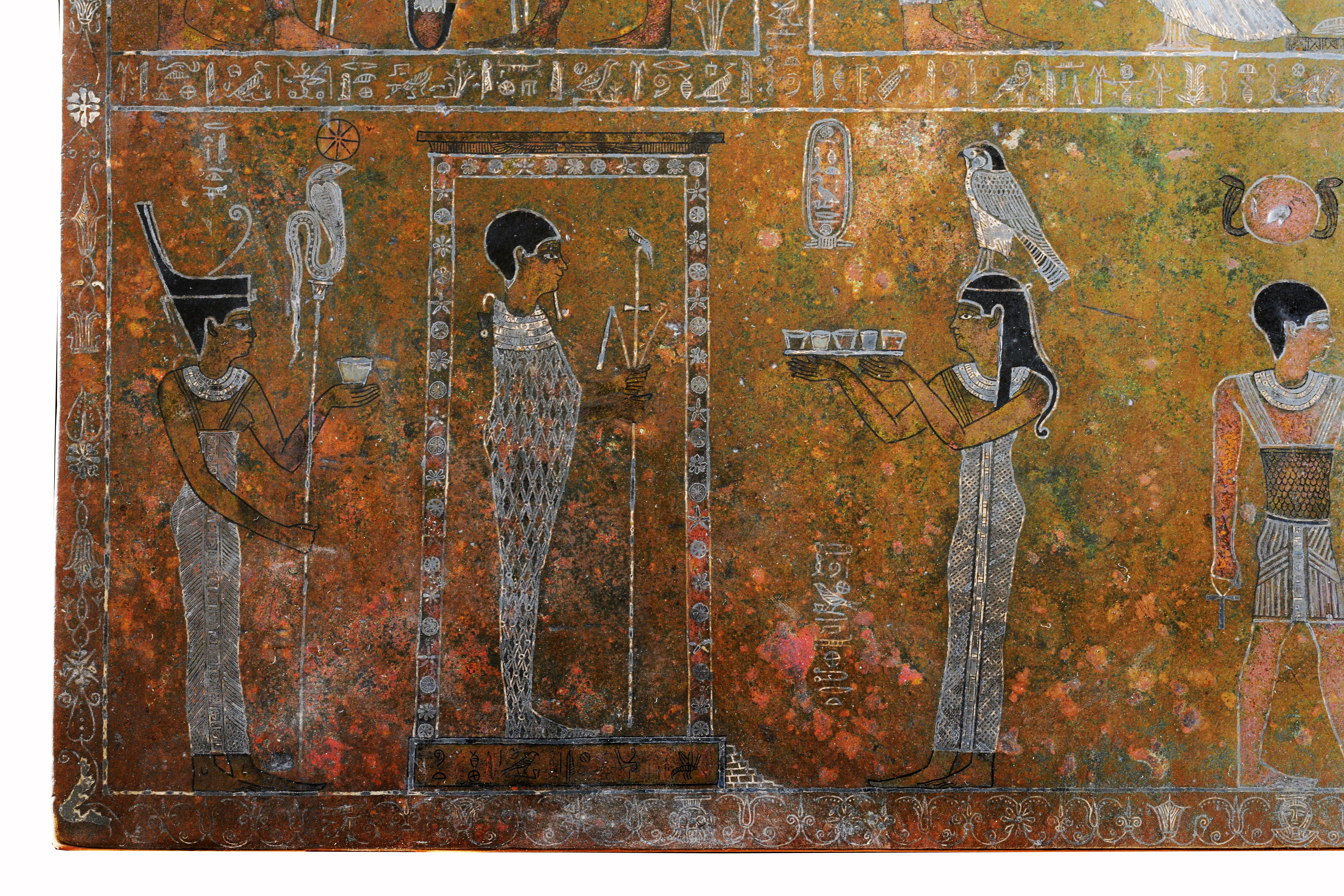
Detail with ritual offering scene

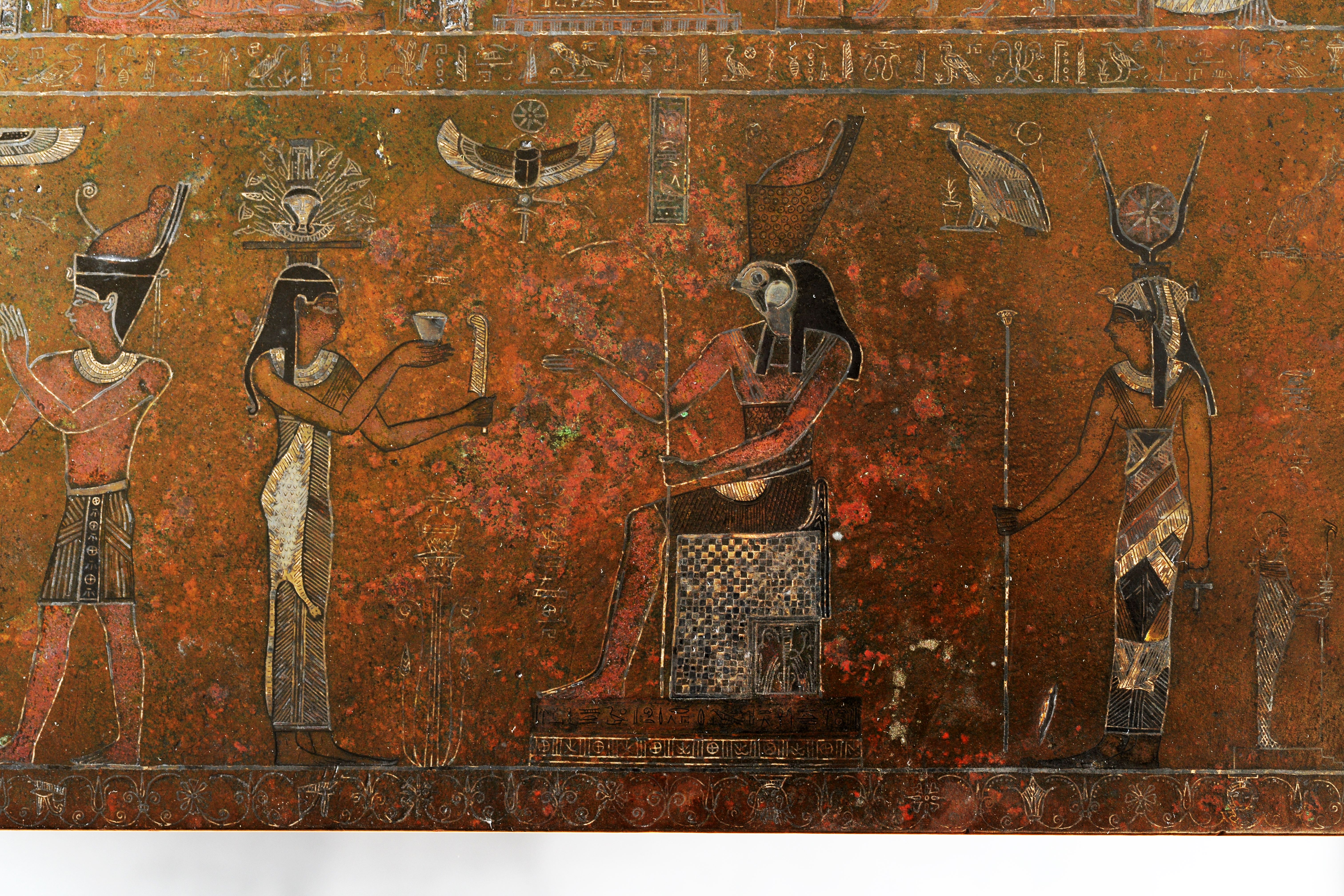
Offering to a falcon-headed god (Horus)

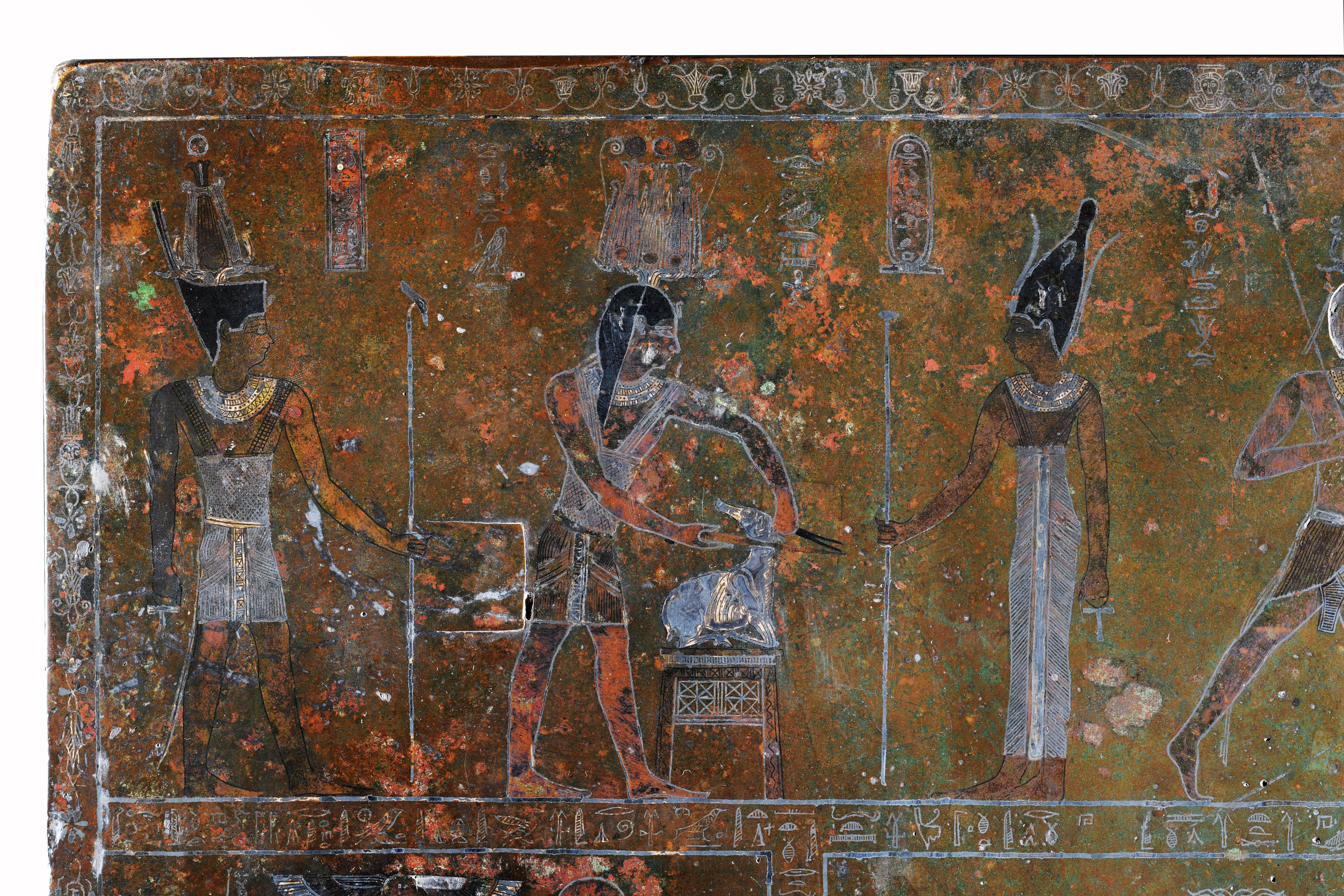
Ritual sacrifice scene

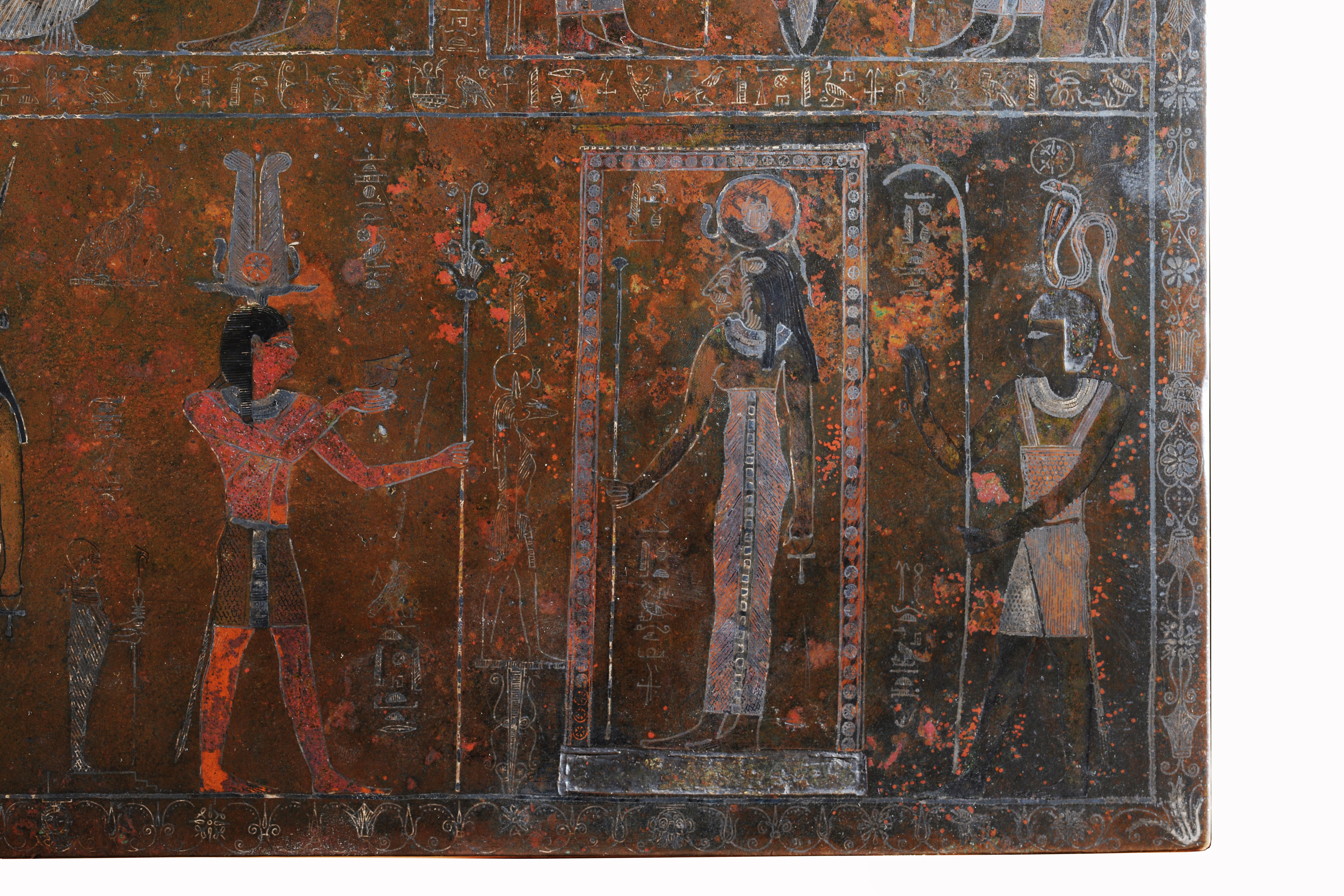
Homage to a lion-headed goddess (Sekhmet)

== Interpretations ==
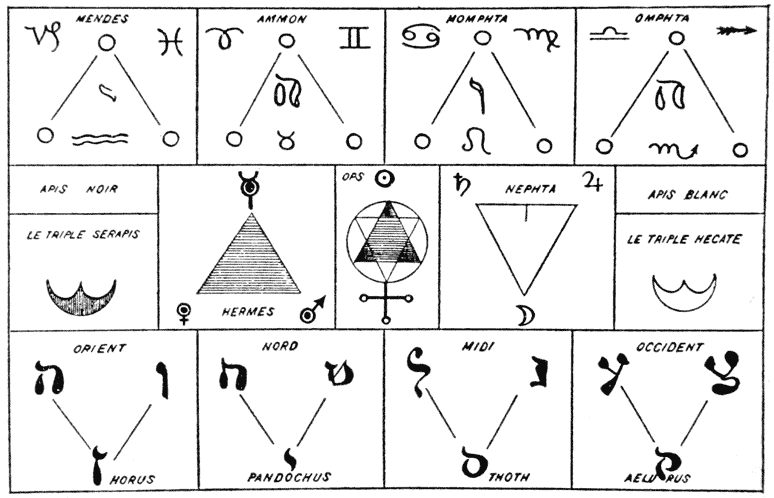
Eliphas Levi's key to the Bembine Tablet

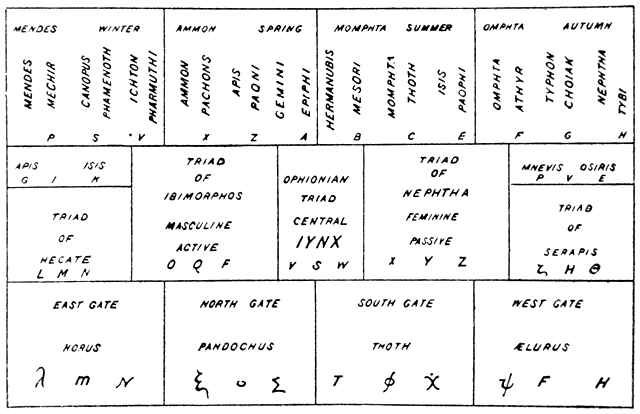
William Wynn Westcott's key to the Bembine Tablet

Although the scenes are Egyptianising, they do not depict Egyptian rites. Figures are shown with non-customary attributes, making it unclear which are divinities and which kings or queens. Egyptian motifs are used without rhyme or reason. However, the central figure is recognisable as Isis, suggesting that the Tablet originated in some Roman centre of her worship.

One of the earliest scholars to study the tablet was Pierio Valeriano Bolzani, who may have seen it before it became generally known after the sack of 1527. His Hieroglyphica sive de sacris Aegyptiorum litteris commentarii seems to have been composed earlier than that, although it was published much later. The work covered the whole field of the meaning of hieroglyphics, but lacked the scholarly rigour of the antiquarian Laurentius Pignorius (1571–1631), whose Characteres Aegyptii, hoc est Sacrorum, quibus Aegyptii utuntur, simulachrorum accurata delineatio et explicatio of 1608 investigates the origin of the tablet as an archaeological object. Avoiding interpretation of the meaning, the author expressed doubts as to whether the images were at all meaningful. These doubts were subsequently proven well-founded.

Later in the 17th century, the Jesuit scholar Athanasius Kircher in Oedipus Aegyptiacus (1652) used the tablet as a primary source for developing his translations of hieroglyphics, which are now known to be incorrect. His book was the source for the English physician and philosopher Sir Thomas Browne, who, in his discourse The Garden of Cyrus (1658) alludes to "the figures of Isis and Osyris, and the Tutelary spirits in the Bembine Table". Seventeenth century scholars of comparative religion such as Kircher and Browne attempted to reconcile the wisdom of antiquity with Christianity, the Bembine Tablet was interpreted as a vehicle for such syncretic thought; thus Browne proposes in his discourse:

"Though he that considereth........ the crosse erected upon a pitcher diffusing streams of water into two basins, with sprinkling branches in them, and all described upon a two-footed altar, as in the Hieroglyphicks of the brazen Table of Bembus will hardly decline all thought of Christian signality in them."

Kircher's speculations were used by several occultists, including Eliphas Levi, William Wynn Westcott and Manly P. Hall, as a key to interpreting the "Book of Thoth" or Tarot. Platonistic writer Thomas Taylor even claimed that this tablet formed the altar before which Plato stood as he received initiation within a subterranean hall in the Great Pyramid of Giza.

According to modern scholarly consensus, the Mensa Isiaca was made in the second half of the first century CE in Rome, perhaps as a decorative piece for the local Isis cult. The artist, who did not understand hieroglyphs at all, seems to have used parts of a real Greco-Roman period text; by changing signs and garbling sections of the text, this resulted in an incomprehensible, purely decorative piece, of which only a few sign groups can be recognized.
