= The World and the Woman =

1916 film by Frank Lloyd, Eugene Moore

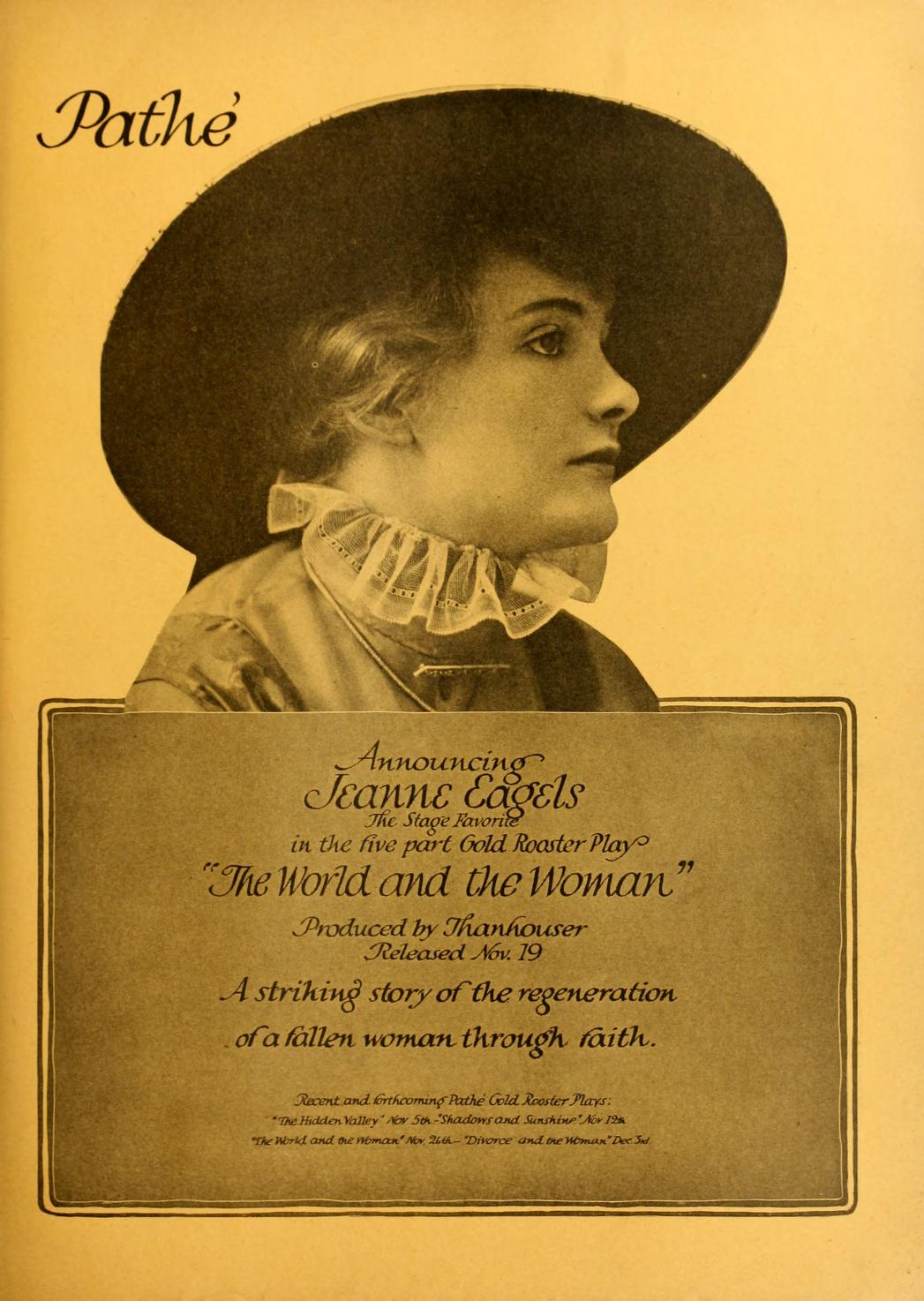
- Directed by: Frank Lloyd; Eugene Moore
- Written by: Philip Lonergan; William C. deMille
- Produced by: Edwin Thanhouser
- Starring: Jeanne Eagels; Boyd Marshall; Thomas A. Curran
- Edited by: Martin G. Cohn; Jack Natteford
- Production company: Thanhouser Film Corp.
- Distributed by: Pathé Exchange; Golden Rooster Plays
- Release date: November 19, 1916
- Running time: 66 minutes
- Country: United States
- Language: Silent (English intertitles)

The World and the Woman (1916)

The World and the Woman is a 1916 American silent drama film starring Jeanne Eagels as a prostitute who seeks a second chance in the countryside. The film was based on the 1914 play Outcast starring Elsie Ferguson, and was remade in 1922 as Outcast, starring Ferguson; in 1928 with Corinne Griffith, also titled Outcast; and with Bette Davis in 1935 as The Girl from 10th Avenue. The film is unrelated to the 1907 novel bearing the same title written by Ruth Kimball Gardiner.

== Cast ==
- Jeanne Eagels as A Woman of the Streets
- Boyd Marshall as The Man
- Thomas A. Curran as James Palmer
- Grace DeCarlton as Mrs. Jim Rollins
- Wayne Arey as Jim Rollins
- Carey L. Hastings as Anna Graham
- Ethelmary Oakland as Sunny

== Preservation ==
A 35 mm print of the film is held by George Eastman House. The film is available on DVD and online.
