= A Royal Family =

1915 silent film

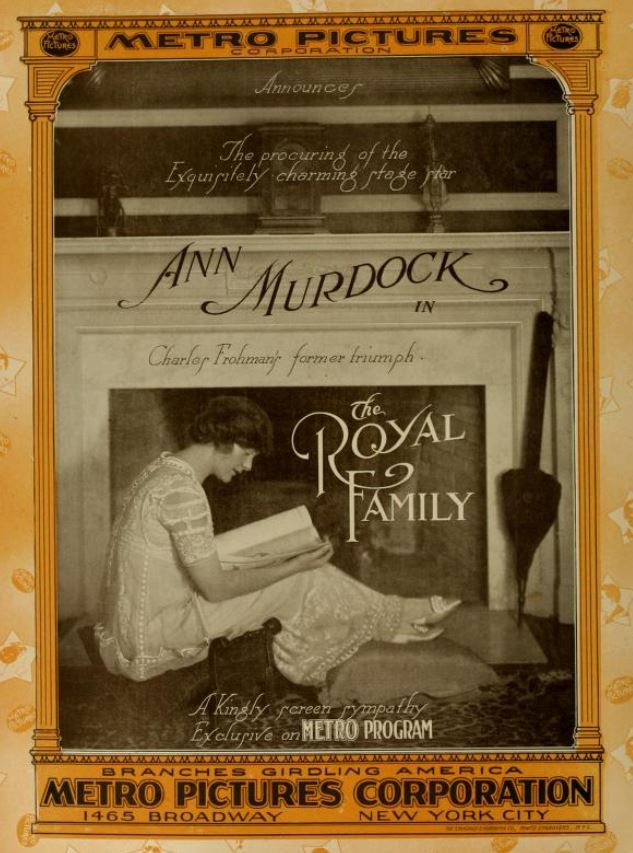
- Poster for A Royal Family (1915)
- Directed by: William Nigh
- Starring: Fuller Mellish; Montagu Love; Anna Murdock
- Cinematography: Arthur A. Cadwell
- Production company: Columbia Pictures
- Distributed by: Metro Pictures
- Release date: August 16, 1915
- Running time: 50 minutes
- Country: United States
- Languages: Silent; English intertitles

A Royal Family is a 1915 American silent drama film directed by William Nigh, starring Fuller Mellish, Montagu Love, and Anna Murdock. It is also sometimes alternatively titled The Royal Family.

== Cast ==
- Fuller Mellish as Cardinal
- Montagu Love as Crown Prince of Kurland
- Anna Murdock as Angela – Princess of Arcacia
- William Nigh as Minister of Police
- Lila Barclay
- Mathilde Brundage
- W. J. Draper
- Edwin Mordant
- Niles Welch
- Albert Lewis
- Jules Cowles
- Charles Prince

== Preservation ==
The film has been preserved by MGM, now is preserved by Turner Entertainment and fallen in public domain.

== Bibliography ==
- James Robert Parish & Michael R. Pitts. Film directors: a guide to their American films. Scarecrow Press, 1974.
