= Oedipus Aegyptiacus =

Publication by Athanasius Kircher on Egyptian Hieroglyphs

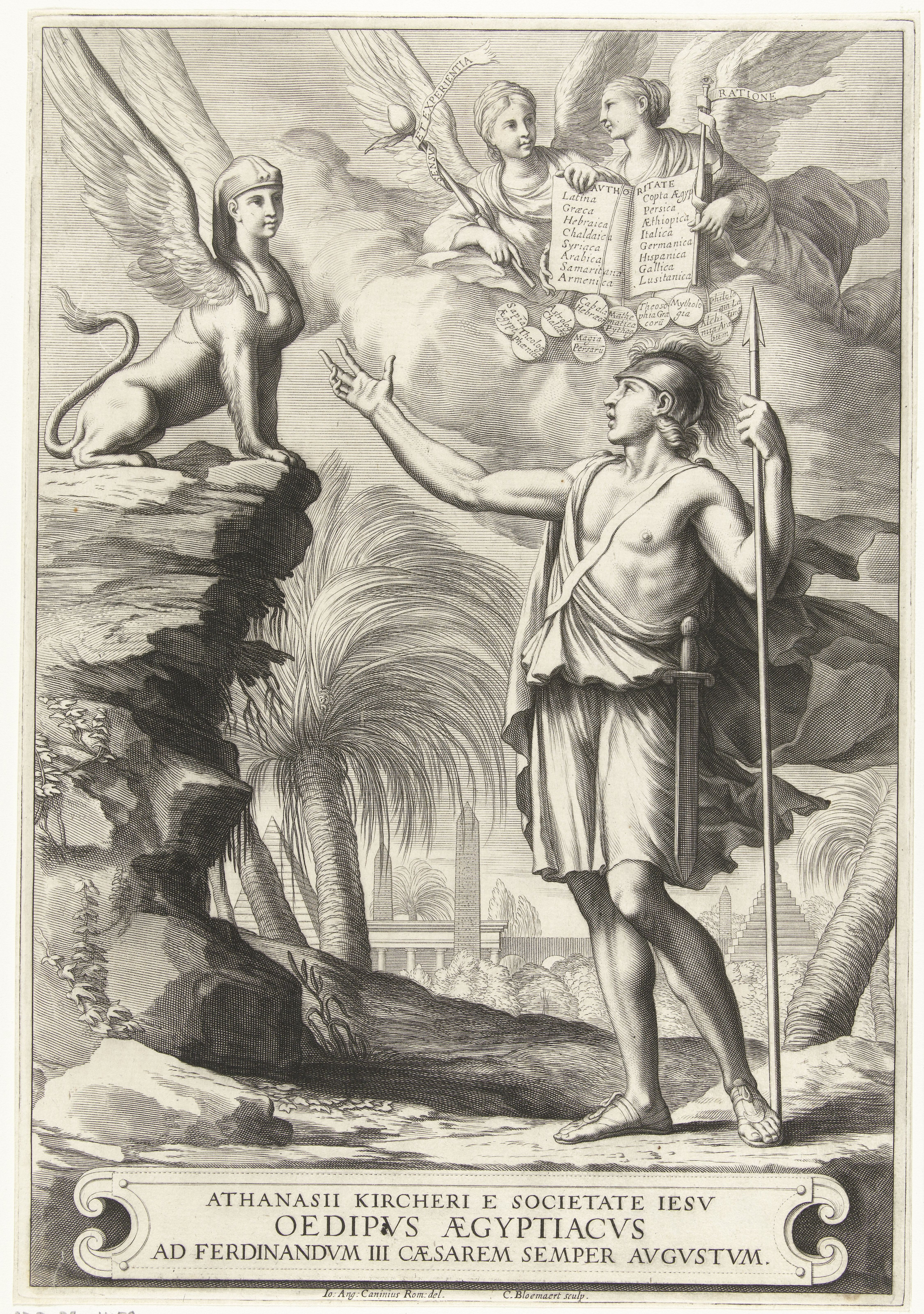
- Frontispiece to Kircher's Oedipus Aegyptiacus; the Sphinx, confronted by Oedipus/Kircher's learning, admits he has solved her riddle.
- Author: Athanasius Kircher
- Original title: Oedipus Aegyptiacus: hoc est, Universalis hieroglyphicæ veterum doctrinæ temporum iniuria abolitæ instauratio
- Language: Latin
- Genre: Egyptology
- Publisher: Vitale Mascardi
- Publication date: 1652–1654
- Publication place: Italy

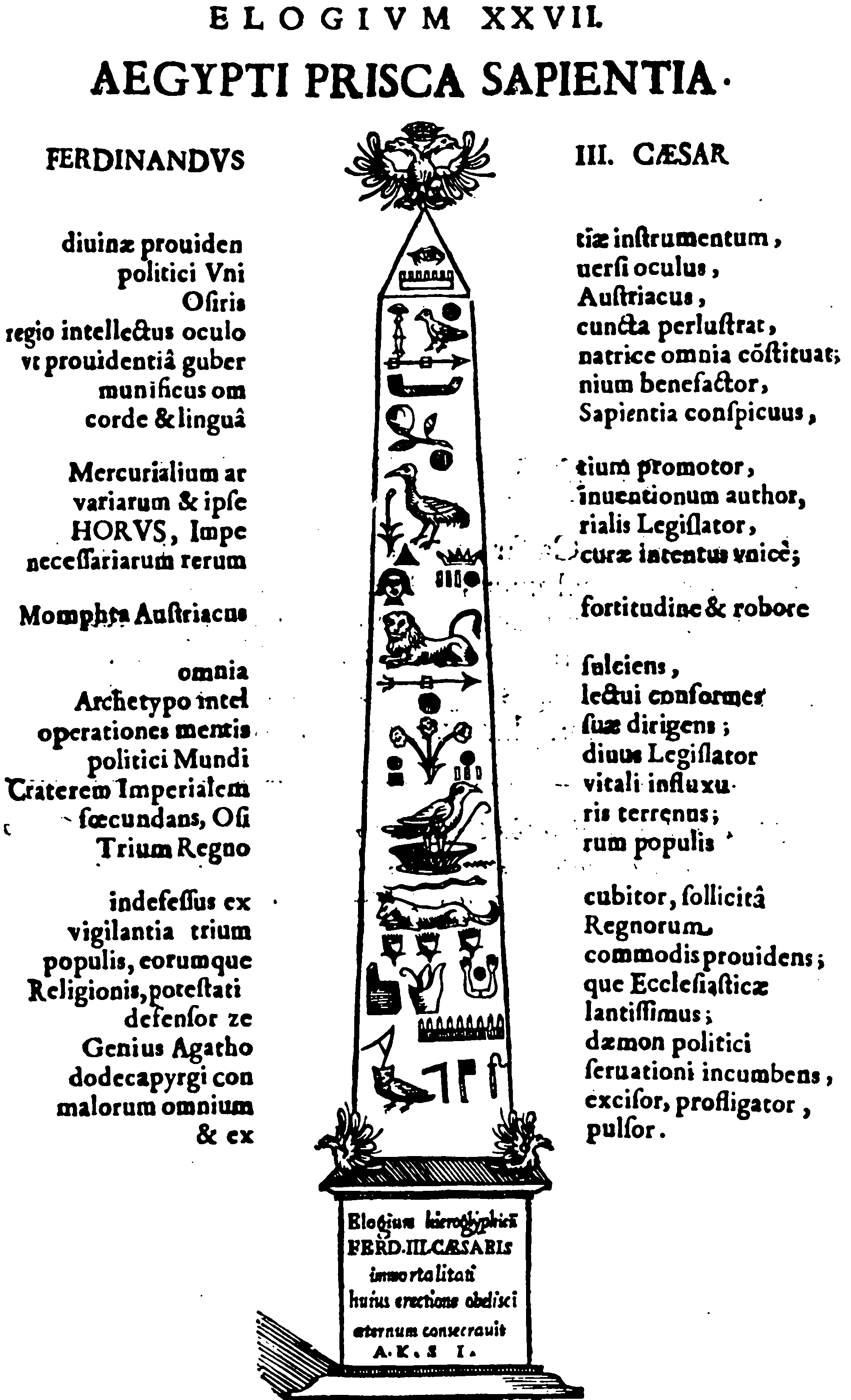
Kircher's fanciful method of translation is displayed in this attempt to produce a panegyric to his patron Ferdinand III in Egyptian. In Kircher's reading, the Eye of Horus and a glyph depicting a chessboard (the syllable mn) are interpreted as "instrument of divine providence, eye of the political universe". (divinae providentiae instrumentum, politici Universi oculus)

Oedipus Aegyptiacus is Athanasius Kircher's supreme work of Egyptology. The three full folio tomes of ornate illustrations and diagrams were published in Rome over the period 1652–54. Kircher cited as his sources Chaldean astrology, Hebrew kabbalah, Greek mythology, Pythagorean mathematics, Arabian alchemy and Latin philology.

In the book, Kircher attempted to translate Egyptian hieroglyphs. His primary source for the study was the Bembine Tablet, a bronze and silver tablet depicting various Egyptian deities with Isis as its centre. The work is representative of antiquarian scholarship in the late Renaissance. Kircher' renditions of hieroglyphic texts are wordy and portentous, though rather speculative in nature. He interpreted the frequent references to the sayings of Osiris in the original Egyptian text as suggestive references to the throne of Isis, the treachery of Typhon, and the vigilance of Anubis.

According to the 20th-century Egyptologist E. A. Wallis Budge, Kircher's translations were nonsensical. But since Kircher published his theories in a "learned tongue", he managed to convince his contemporaries that his translations were accurate. The accurate meaning of Egyptian hieroglyphs was not deciphered until 1824, when Jean-François Champollion finally solved the riddle through his study of the Rosetta Stone.

== Hieroglyphs ==
The third volume of Oedipus Aegyptiacus deals exclusively with Kircher's attempts to translate Egyptian hieroglyphs. The primary source for Kircher's study of hieroglyphs was the Bembine Tablet, so named after its acquisition by Cardinal Bembo, shortly after the sack of Rome in 1527. The Bembine Tablet is a bronze and silver tablet depicting various Egyptian gods and goddesses. In its centre sits Isis representing "the polymorphic all-containing Universal Idea."

Kircher's Oedipus Aegyptiacus is an example of syncretic and eclectic scholarship in the late Renaissance and representative of antiquarian scholarship before the modern scientific era. His renditions of hieroglyphic texts tended to be wordy and portentous; for example, he translated a frequently occurring phrase in Egyptian, dd Wsr, "Osiris says," as "The treachery of Typhon ends at the throne of Isis, the moisture of nature is guarded by the vigilance of Anubis."

Kircher was respected in the seventeenth century for his study of Egyptian hieroglyphs; his contemporary Sir Thomas Browne (1605–1682) who owned several books by Kircher, including Oedipus Aegyptiacus, paid tribute to him as an Egyptologist and his study of hieroglyphs:

But no man is likely to profound the ocean of that doctrine beyond that eminent example of industrious learning, Kircherus.

On the other hand, modern experts on hieroglyphic writing have found Kircher's work to be of little value. According to E. A. Wallis Budge:

Many writers pretended to have found the key to the hieroglyphics, and many more professed, with a shameless impudence which is hard to understand in these days, to translate the contents of the texts into a modern tongue. Foremost among such pretenders must be mentioned Athanasius Kircher, who, in the 17th century, declared that he had found the key to the hieroglyphic inscriptions; the translations which he prints in his Oedipus Aegyptiacus are utter nonsense, but as they were put forth in a learned tongue many people at the time believed they were correct.

The accurate meaning of Egyptian hieroglyphs were not deciphered until 1824 when Jean-François Champollion finally solved the riddle through his study of the Rosetta Stone.

== Use in a museum exhibition ==
In 1999 the University of Geneva exhibited one of the vast tomes of Oedipus Aegyptiacus in an exhibition to celebrate the centenary of Jorge Luis Borges as representative of books associated with the Argentinian author.

== Sources ==
- Athanasius Kircher: A Renaissance man in search of lost knowledge. Joscelyn Godwin pub. Thames and Hudson 1979
- Athanasius Kircher The last man who knew everything. edited by Paula Findlen Routledge 2004
- Athanasius Kircher's Theatre of the World Joscelyn Godwin pub. Thames and Hudson 2015
