= Outcast (1922 film) =

1922 film

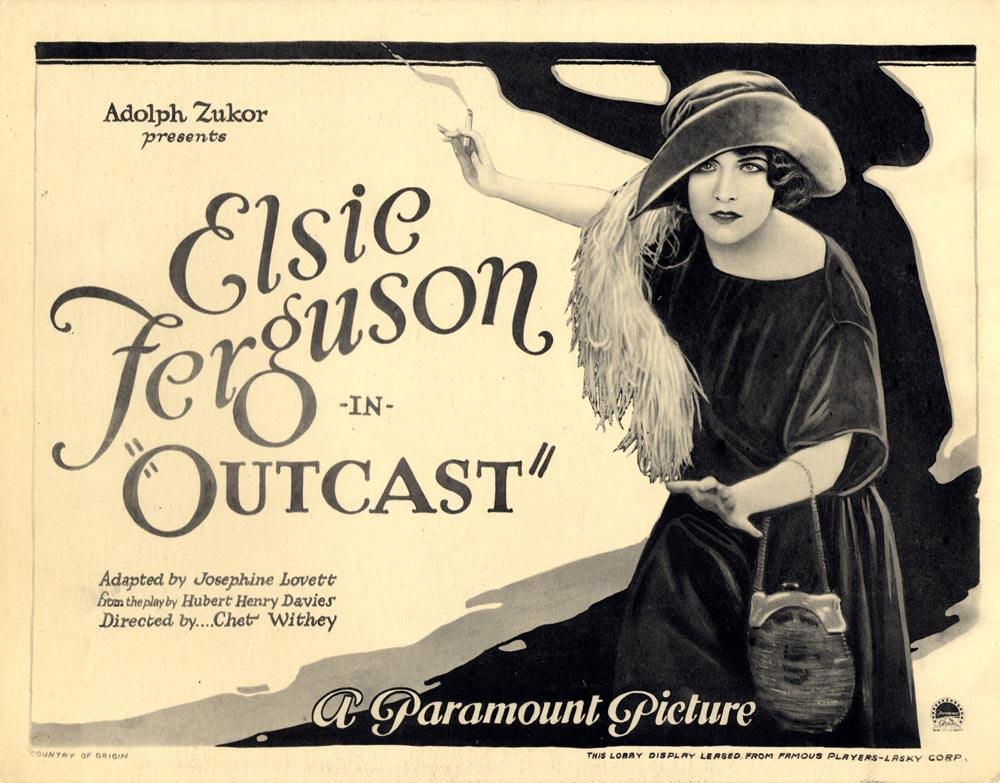
- Outcast lobby card
- Directed by: Chester "Chet" Withey
- Written by: Josephine Lovett (scenario)
- Based on: Outcast by Hubert Henry Davies
- Produced by: Famous Players–Lasky
- Starring: Elsie Ferguson; David Powell; William Powell
- Cinematography: Ernest Haller
- Distributed by: Paramount Pictures
- Release date: December 11, 1922
- Running time: 70 minutes
- Country: United States
- Language: Silent (English intertitles)

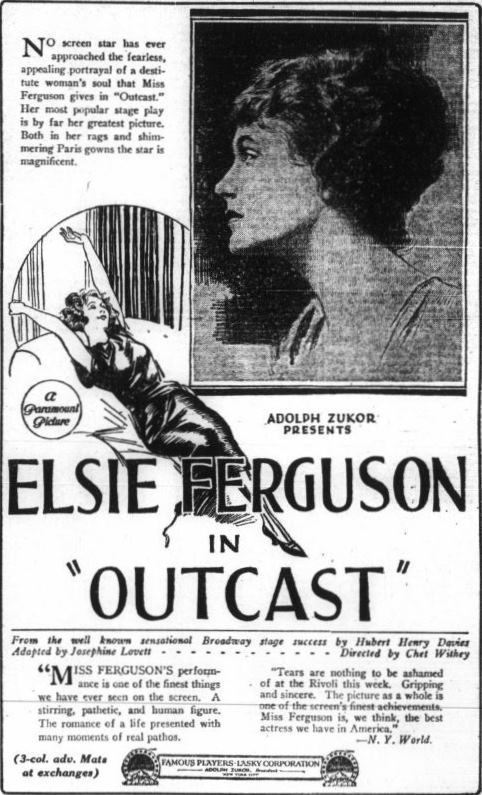
newspaper advertisement

Outcast is a 1922 American silent drama film directed by Chester Withey. The film starred Elsie Ferguson (in her next to last silent) and David Powell. William Powell has a small supporting part in this which was his third film.

The film is based on the play of the same name by Hubert Henry Davies and had been performed on Broadway in 1914 with Ferguson in the lead. The story was filmed in 1916 as The World and the Woman with Jeanne Eagels, afterwards as Outcast with Ann Murdock. After Ferguson's version it was filmed as Outcast with Corinne Griffith and Edmund Lowe in a Vitaphone version in 1928, and finally was the basis of The Girl From 10th Avenue (1935) starring Bette Davis and released by Warner Brothers.

== Plot ==
As described in a contemporary film publication, Valentine Moreland has married her husband for money and jilted Geoffrey Sherwood. He feels her rejection keenly, and his friend Tony Hewlitt finds Geoffrey alone in his apartment drinking.

Miriam, abandoned by her husband and whose child had died from neglect, has been forced out on the street when her room's rent becomes overdue. Tony sprays some soda water out the window and hits Miriam. Miriam is invited in and Tony offers to compensate her for her hat. She tells Geoffrey her story, and he sees that he is no worse off than other people. Miriam works with Geoffrey in his South American business and he helps her get an apartment. She loves him and tries to win his affection, but he is held back by his memory of Valentine.

Valentine has become weary of her elderly husband and seeks Geoffrey at his apartment. Miriam arrives and, seeing that Geoffrey is infatuated with Valentine, resolves to leave. Valentine glances out the window and, seeing her husband John entering the house, panics. Miriam hides Geoffrey and Valentine in the next room, and, when John comes in, convinces him that she is Geoffrey's mistress and the only woman there. After John leaves, Valentine decides to rejoin her husband.

Miriam leaves and, after sending a letter to Geoffrey indicating an intent to kill herself, leaves on a boat for South America. Geoffrey pursues her in a seaplane and rescues her when she jumps of the ship. They are married and honeymoon in Rio.

== Cast ==
- Elsie Ferguson as Miriam
- David Powell as Geoffrey Sherwood
- William David as Tony Hewlitt
- Mary MacLaren as Valentine Moreland
- Charles Wellesley as John Moreland
- Teddy Sampson as Nellie Essex
- William Powell as DeValle

== Preservation status ==
The 1922 film is now considered a lost film. However, one source claims a print may exist in Milan, Italy at the Cineteca Italiana (*UPDATE;though this may be a mistake for the 1928 Corinne Griffith version which is now listed in Cineteca Italiana - September 2016).
