= Outcast (1928 film) =

1928 film directed by William A. Seiter

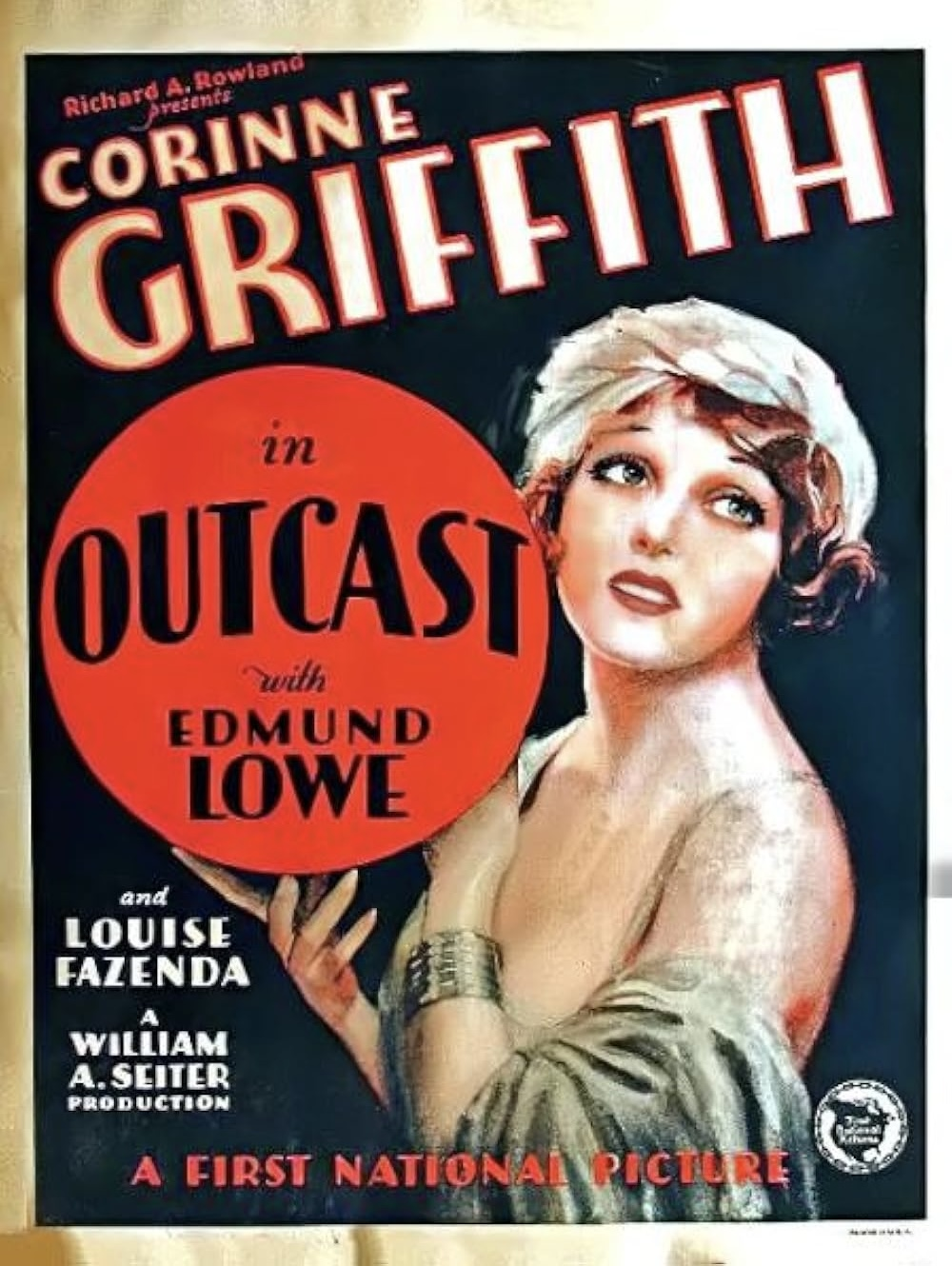
- theatrical release poster
- Directed by: William A. Seiter
- Written by: Agnes Christine Johnston (scenario); Forrest Halsey (titles); Gene Towne (titles)
- Based on: Outcast (1914 play) by Hubert Henry Davies
- Produced by: Richard A. Rowland
- Starring: Corinne Griffith; Edmund Lowe; Louise Fazenda
- Cinematography: John F. Seitz
- Edited by: Hugh Bennett
- Music by: Karl Hajos; Victor Schertzinger
- Production company: First National Pictures
- Distributed by: Warner Bros. Pictures
- Release date: November 11, 1928
- Running time: 80 minutes
- Country: United States
- Language: Sound (Synchronized) (English intertitles)

Outcast is a 1928 American synchronized sound drama film produced and distributed by First National Pictures. While the film has no audible dialog, it was released with a synchronized musical score with sound effects using the sound-on-disc Vitaphone process. It was directed by William A. Seiter and stars Corinne Griffith, often considered one of the most beautiful women in film. This story had been filmed in 1917 as The World and the Woman with Jeanne Eagels. In 1922 a Paramount film of the same name with Elsie Ferguson reprising her stage role was released. Both films were based on a 1914 play, Outcast, by Hubert Henry Davies which starred Ferguson. The Seiter/Griffith film was an all silent with Vitaphone music and sound effects. In the sound era the story was filmed once again as The Girl from 10th Avenue starring Bette Davis. According to the Library of Congress database shows a print surviving complete at Cineteca Italiana in Milan.

== Plot ==
Miriam, beautiful and destitute, is ejected from her lodging house with only three dollars to her name. Rather than spend it on necessities, she boldly uses the money to buy a stylish hat. While passing a fashionable apartment building, her hat becomes the accidental target of soda water sprayed by Geoffrey, a wealthy young man drowning his sorrows after being jilted by his former love, Valentine, who has just married the affluent Mr. Moreland.

Irritated, Miriam storms up to confront him. Their confrontation unexpectedly sparks a connection. Geoffrey, amused and intrigued, invites her to the wedding reception of Valentine and Moreland, where he creates a scandal by confronting his former sweetheart in public.

Sympathetic to Miriam's circumstances, Geoffrey sets her up in a comfortable apartment. Over time, she begins to truly love him and makes efforts to improve herself. Meanwhile, Geoffrey abandons his reckless lifestyle and finds happiness again. Their bond deepens—until Geoffrey crosses paths with Valentine once more. Still alluring and manipulative, Valentine deliberately rekindles his old feelings.

Crushed by Geoffrey's emotional drift, Miriam turns to his two loyal friends, Hugh and Tony, for support. Though tempted to return to her old life, Miriam finds herself incapable of it—her love for Geoffrey has changed her too deeply.

When Hugh asks her to help avert a potential scandal between Geoffrey and Valentine, Miriam agrees. She arrives at Geoffrey's apartment to find Valentine alone with him. Posing as a cast-off lover, Miriam demands hush money—$10,000—from Geoffrey. Stunned, he begins writing the check. Miriam then raises the stakes, threatening to approach Valentine's husband, Mr. Moreland, and demand an even higher price.

Panicked at the threat to her marriage and reputation, Valentine exposes her true nature. She has no intention of leaving her wealthy husband and rushes from the room, desperate to reach him before Miriam can. But Miriam has only hidden herself in another room, never intending to follow through on her bluff.

The plan works. With Valentine unmasked as self-serving and opportunistic, Geoffrey realizes the depth of Miriam's love and the shallowness of his former flame. Miriam emerges, and Geoffrey embraces her, declaring, “You always come into my life just when I need you most.”

== Cast ==
- Corinne Griffith as Miriam
- James Ford as Tony
- Edmund Lowe as Geoffrey
- Huntley Gordon as Hugh
- Kathryn Carver as Valentine
- Louise Fazenda as Mabel
- Claude King as Moreland
- Sam Hardy as Jack
- Patsy O'Byrne as Mrs. O'Brien
- Lee Moran as Fred

== Music ==
The film featured a theme song entitled "Another Kiss" which was composed by Victor Schertzinger.

== Preservation status ==
- Print exists in Cineteca Italiana, Italian archive Milan.

== See also ==
- List of early sound feature films (1926–1929)
- The World and the Woman (1916)
- Outcast (1917)
- Outcast (1922)
- The Girl from 10th Avenue (1935)
