= The Seventh Sin (1917 film) =

1917 silent film

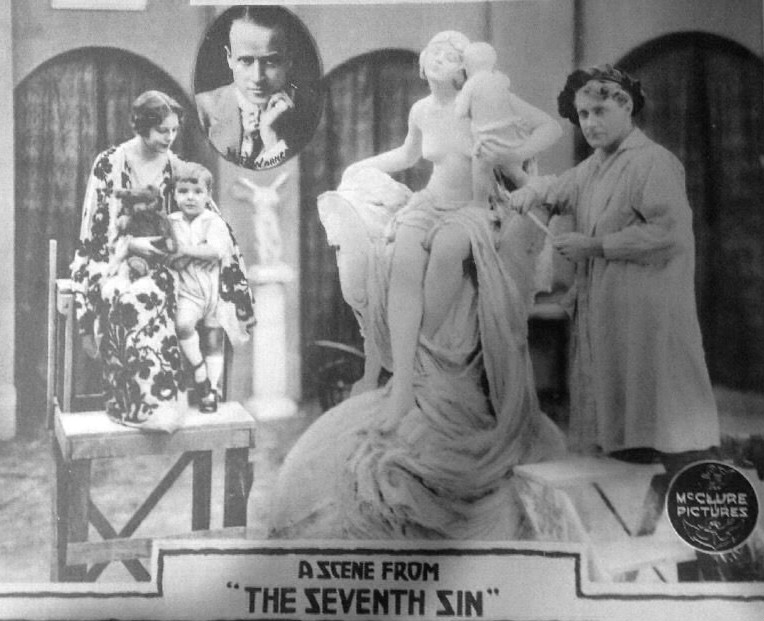
- Directed by: Theodore Marston
- Starring: Shirley Mason; George LeGuere; Anna Murdock
- Production company: McClure Publishing Company
- Distributed by: Triangle Distributing
- Release date: March 17, 1917
- Running time: 70 minutes
- Country: United States
- Languages: Silent; English intertitles

The Seventh Sin is a 1917 American silent drama film directed by Theodore Marston and starring Shirley Mason, George Le Guere and Anna Murdock. It was the final entry into a seven-film series based on the Seven Deadly Sins.

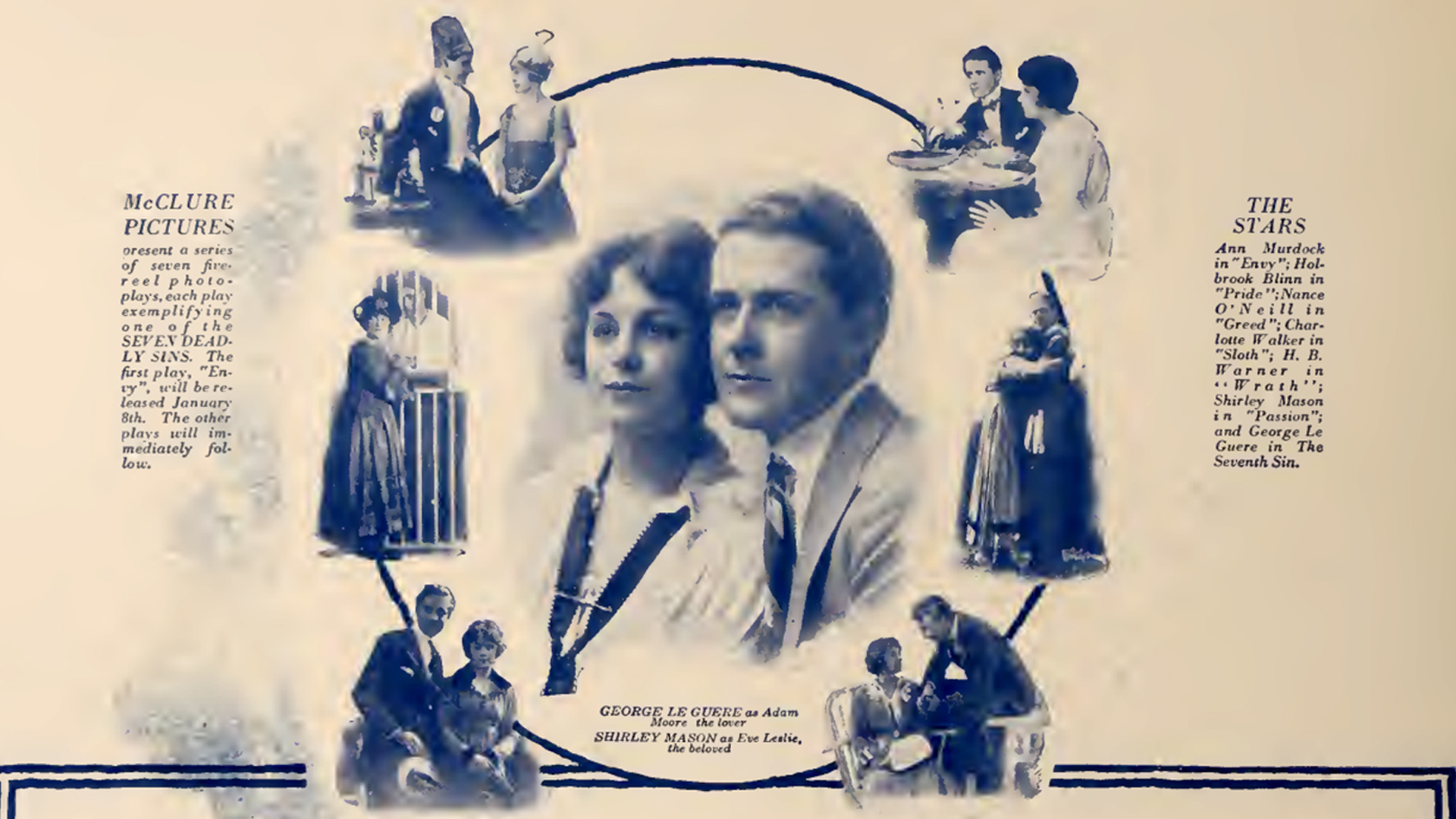
George LeGuere and Shirley Mason with scenes from the film

== Cast ==
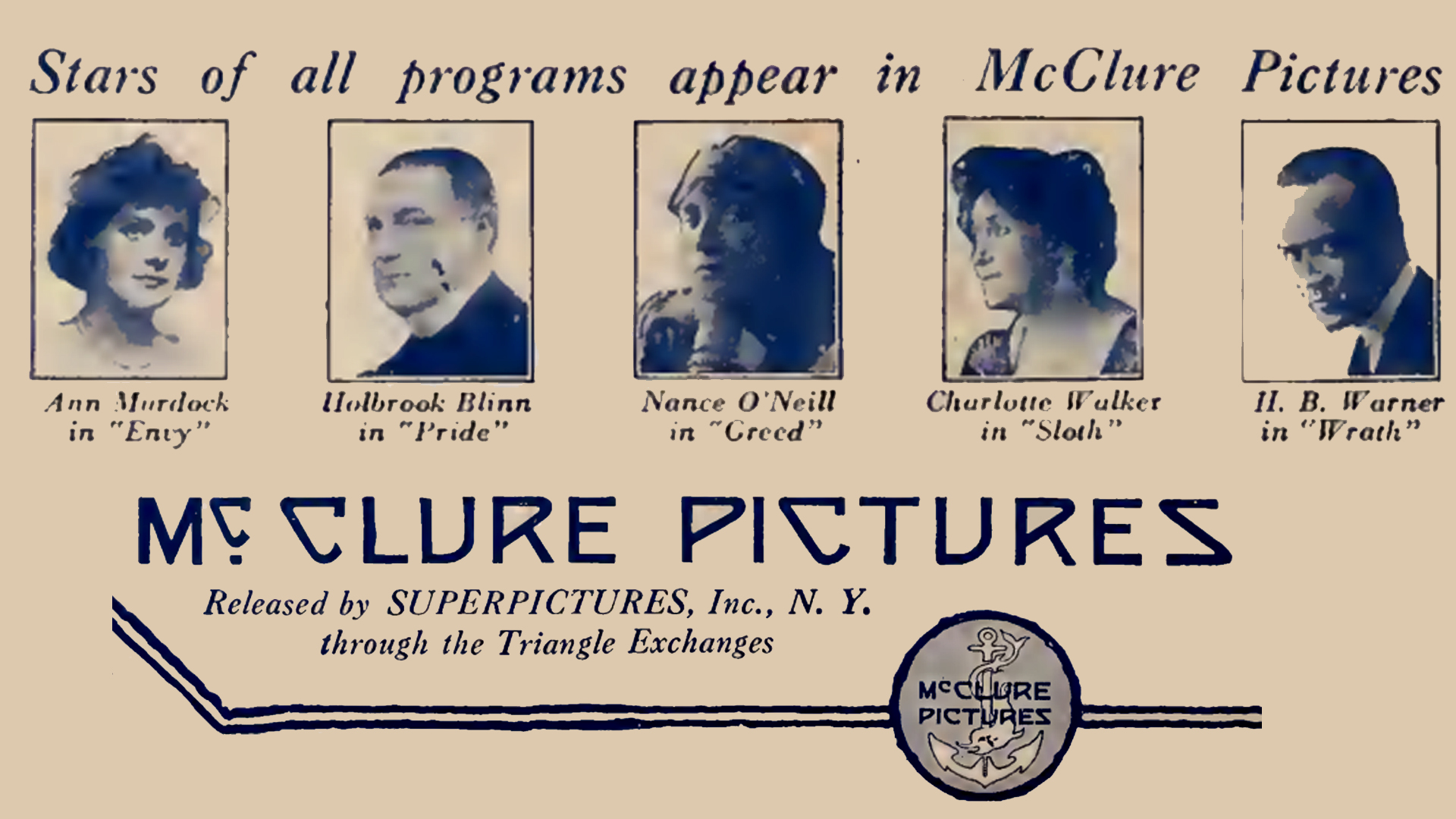
The cast of 7 Deadly Sins from 1917 advertisement

- Shirley Mason as Eve Leslie
- George Le Guere as Adam Moore
- Anna Murdock as Betty Howard
- Holbrook Blinn as Eugene D'Arcy
- Nance O'Neil as Alma
- Charlotte Walker as Margaret Brent / Sally Wells / Molly Pitcher
- H.B. Warner as Feodor / The Grand Duke

== Preservation ==
The film survives complete at the Library of Congress archive.

== Bibliography ==
- Robert B. Connelly. The Silents: Silent Feature Films, 1910-36, Volume 40, Issue 2. December Press, 1998.
