= Daughters of the Moon =

Novel series by Lynne Ewing

- Author: Lynne Ewing
- Language: English
- Series: Daughters of the Moon
- Genre: Fantasy, Young adult fiction
- Publisher: Hyperion
- Publication date: 2000
- Publication place: United States

Daughters of the Moon is a novel series by Lynne Ewing. The main characters are mortal goddesses who fight an ancient evil called The Atrox. They have different powers, destinies, dark sides and all wear moon amulets. When they turn 17, they have to make a choice to become something more or continue their lives as mortals giving up their powers and their memories of them, as Daughters of the Moon. All of the daughters live in Los Angeles, battling The Atrox and its dark followers. Sons of the Dark is a companion series.

== International titles ==
- France: Les Filles de la Lune
- Germany: Magic Friends
- Sweden: Måndöttrar

== Series, in Order ==
Daughters of the Moon & Sons of the Dark*:

1. Goddess of the Night (2000)
2. Into the Cold Fire (2000)
3. Night Shade (2001)
4. The Secret Scroll (2001)
5. The Sacrifice (2001)
6. The Lost One (2001)
7. Moon Demon (2002)
8. Possession (2002)
9. The Choice (2003)
10. The Talisman (2003)
11. The Prophecy (2004)
12. Barbarian* (2004)
13. Escape* (2004)
14. The Becoming (2004)
15. Outcast* (2005)
16. Night Sun* (2005)
17. The Final Eclipse (2007)

=== Omnibus editions ===
- Daughters of the Moon: Volume One: Books 1 - 3 (omnibus) (2010)
- Daughters of the Moon: Volume Two: Books 4 - 6 (omnibus) (2011)
