= The Girl from 10th Avenue =

1935 film by Alfred E. Green

- Theatrical release poster
- Directed by: Alfred E. Green
- Written by: Charles Kenyon
- Based on: Outcast (c.1914), a play by Hubert Henry Davies
- Produced by: Henry Blanke; Robert Lord
- Starring: Bette Davis; Ian Hunter
- Cinematography: James Van Trees
- Edited by: Owen Marks
- Music by: Heinz Roemheld
- Production company: Warner Bros. Pictures
- Release date: May 26, 1935
- Running time: 69 minutes
- Country: United States
- Language: English

The Girl from 10th Avenue is a 1935 American drama film directed by Alfred E. Green. The screenplay by Charles Kenyon is based on the 1914 play Outcast by Hubert Henry Davies. The film was released in the United Kingdom as Men on Her Mind.

== Plot ==
Geoffrey Sherwood, rejected by Valentine French in favor of wealthier suitor John Marland, watches her wedding from outside the church. Inebriated, he becomes increasingly louder, drawing the attention of two policemen as well as Miriam Brady, a shopgirl on her lunch hour, who takes Geoff to a cafe to spare him from arrest. There they encounter Hugh Brown and Tony Hewlitt, two of his society friends, who offer Miriam $100 to keep an eye on Geoffrey and make sure he stays out of trouble.

The following morning the couple discover that while under the influence of alcohol they were married by a justice of the peace. Miriam offers to give her new husband his freedom, but he decides to remain with her. They set up housekeeping in an apartment in a lower-class neighborhood, and while Geoff starts his own business, Miriam tries to improve herself with the assistance of Mrs. Martin, her landlady and a former showgirl.

With his bride helping him to stay sober, Geoff succeeds and the marriage remains solid until Valentine decides she wants him back. Miriam confronts the woman in a restaurant and their ensuing argument is reported in the newspaper. Miriam leaves Geoff who, realizing he truly loves her, tells Valentine they have no future together, finds his wife, and gives her a wedding band as a sign of his commitment to their marriage.

== Cast ==
- Bette Davis as Miriam Brady
- Ian Hunter as Geoffrey Sherwood
- Katharine Alexander as Valentine French
- Colin Clive as John Marland
- John Eldredge as Hugh Brown
- Phillip Reed as Tony Hewlett
- Alison Skipworth as Mrs. Martin

== Production ==
This was the fourth screen adaptation of the Hubert Henry Davies play Outcast, which had run for 168 performances at the Lyceum Theatre on Broadway. The first film version was made in 1917 with Anna Murdock and David Powell.

Powell reprised his role in the 1922 film version opposite Elsie Ferguson, who had starred in the original Broadway production. The 1928 version, with a Vitaphone score and sound effects, starred Corinne Griffith and Edmund Lowe.

== Critical reception ==
Variety wrote the film "is fashioned from a pattern whose every turn and twist the dullest fan can easily anticipate...Narrative is chockful of implausible sequences and the plot...often gets itself into blind alleys. But deft direction plus smooth trouping by Davis make these defects not too noticeable."
