= Sons of the Dark =

Book series by Lynne Ewing

- Barbarian, the first book in the series; Obie is on the cover
- Author: Lynne Ewing
- Language: English
- Series: Sons of the Dark
- Genre: Fiction, Fantasy, Juvenile
- Publisher: Hyperion
- Publication date: July 2007
- Publication place: United States
- Media type: Hardcover
- Pages: 288
- Followed by: Escape, book 2

Sons of the Dark is a book series that was spun off from American author Lynne Ewing's best-selling Daughters of the Moon series.

This series is about four very different young teenage boys living in Los Angeles. They are all immortal and all four have to try to fit in. Each boy also fights his dark side. They each have different powers and the Sons must complete their destinies and stop the people of Nefandus from invading the Earth's realm.

Due to poor book sales, the series has been discontinued. The Sons' fate is told in the last Daughters of the Moon book.

== Introduction ==
Four guys living in Los Angeles: A rock star, a rebel, an artist, and a shaman. Like most students at Turney High School, they're just trying to survive. But for these four—Renegades on the run from the sinister world of Nefandus—survival means learning how to control their powers and fulfill their destiny as Sons of the Dark.

== The Sons of the Dark and others ==
Omer "Obie" Ostrov

Once a Visigoth warrior, Obie is now a high school student and trying hard to control his wild impulses while still performing in his band. In 361 AD, after he was born, his aunt tried to kill him but his mother saved him by committing him to the Legend. He has the power to cast spells with the Rune stones his mother gave him. He is first introduced in Barbarian (Book #1). His aunt lives in Nefandus and she is jealous of his power. He plays in a band called Pagan after he escapes Nefandus. In the end, he sacrificed himself so Catty would stay alive and destroy the Atrox.

Samuel Reardon

Samuel is from the pioneer times. He shows up for the first time in Escape (Book #2). He was captured with his friend Macduff in 1768. He discovers that he has the power to call on animals and sometimes turn into them. He and Maddie, a girl he meets when he escapes Nefandus, have an on-and-off relationship. In the end, he sacrificed himself so Catty would stay alive and destroy the Atrox.

Kyle Ormond

From the modern times, he never knew who his real parents were. In Outcast (Book #3), he discovers who he is: his father is a powerful demon, he created his favorite foster parent and his "twin brother" Kent with his power of projection, and that his destiny and Catty's, a Daughter of the Moon whom he dated, are intertwined. His mother escaped Nefandus with Kyle to protect him from the Regulators after he was born. He was named by the nurses in the hospital he was born in. He escaped Nefandus with the help of a monk. In the end, he sacrificed himself so Catty would stay alive and destroy the Atrox.

Yaolt "Berto" Roberto Ehecatl

Berto is from the Toltec Nation. He has the power of astral projection. He was going to be sacrificed to his god, Tezcatlipoca, but was kidnapped by Obie's master, Hawkwick, and a demon named Semihazah. They took him to Nefandus in 1000 BC. His book is Night Sun (Book #4). He is an entrance guard at a club called Quake. In the end, he sacrificed himself so Catty would stay alive and destroy the Atrox.

Ashley

Showing up for the first time in book 2, she is a venatrix, a servus who is a bounty hunter. She is from Mesopotamia. She and Berto were lovers when they were together in the digs. After they escaped, she became a bounty hunter because for each servus she returns, her ability to time-travel is extended. In book 2, she helps Samuel receive his power. Apparently, she and Klye also have history together. In book 4, she tells Berto the rest of the Legend, asks him to join evil's side, and reveals that she has a son. She tells Berto that she has to return before the night sun to change her son's destructive fate. He agrees and she takes him to Nefandus. After she is told that she can go home, she does so and succeeds in changing her son's fate.

Madison-Maddie Sledgeheimer

Sledge's younger sister, she is in involved the occult and believes in the supernatural. In book 2, she meets Samuel in a graveyard, trying to help her friend Emily, whom she believes was attacked by a vampire named Macduff. She gets kidnapped in Nefandus but the Sons help her escape. Obie erases her memory to protect her. In book 4, Obie's spell is wearing off and she begins to remember and also see things. She helps Berto even though she didn't understand what she was doing and she tries to tell him the dangers they face but before Berto can stop Obie, once again her memory is erased. She and Samuel have an on and off relationship.

== Books ==
=== Barbarian (2004) ===
Barbarian was published September 1, 2004.

In this novel, Obie hates Los Angeles and all the junk that goes with it—especially trying to fit in at Thomas Turney High School. But with bounty hunters trying to capture him, his Renegade roommates urge him to lie low with his band and forget about ever getting back home. It's hard to blend in at school, though, when you've just made enemies with the football team. Obie can't keep away from Allison, the most popular girl in school and the girlfriend of the star quarterback, Sledge. And when his true love, Inna, shows up and pleads for his help, Obie must return to the one place he fears most.

=== Escape (2004) ===
Escape was published in 2004.

In the novel, Samuel has just landed in modern-day L.A. He is totally lost until the beautiful Ashley shows up and promises to help him travel back in time to find his family. But the Sons of the Dark believe that Samuel is the fourth, the one they've been waiting for. They urge him not to believe in Ashley—she is only using him to destroy them all. But Samuel knows Ashley is his only hope for finding his way home. Should he trust her? Even if it means turning his back on the Sons of the Dark?

=== Outcast (2005) ===
Outcast was published in 2005.

In the novel, Kyle knows his roommates hate it when he tells them what to do—but he's the only one from modern-day L.A., and the only one with a clue about how to blend in. But lately, the Sons are more than just annoyed with Kyle—they've started spreading vicious rumors about him behind his back. Even Emily, a girl he barely knows, accuses him of terrible betrayal. Now Kyle is being haunted by someone, or something, from the childhood he's tried hard to forget. And without his friends to help him, Kyle may be no match for the evil from his past.

=== Night Sun (2005) ===
In the novel, students from Turney High School are disappearing without a trace, except for a perfect black circle burned into the pavement. Wild speculation is flying through the halls. Some think it has to do with the coming solar eclipse, and others think alien abductions are to blame. Berto has a different theory. And if he's right, the Legend of Four is about to come true: four will venture in, but only one will venture out. Kyle, Obie, Samuel, and Berto must go to Nefandus and find the kidnapped teenagers—but which of the Sons of the Dark will survive?

== Preferred reading order ==
- Daughters of the Moon 1–11
- Sons of the Dark 1–2
- Daughters of the Moon 12
- Sons of the Dark 3–4
- Daughters of the Moon 13
