= Sisters of Isis =

Book series by Lynne Ewing

- Divine One, second book in the series, Meri is on the cover
- Author: Lynne Ewing
- Language: English
- Series: Sisters of Isis
- Genre: Fiction, Fantasy, Juvenile
- Publisher: Hyperion
- Publication date: April 2007
- Publication place: United States
- Media type: Hardcover
- Pages: 288
- Preceded by: The Summoning, book 1
- Followed by: Enchantress, book 3

Sisters of Isis is a book series by Lynne Ewing. It is about three girls who live in Washington D.C. who have never met until a priest named Abdel brings them together. They each can cast spells from the Book of Thoth and have the power of transformation. They each have a birthmark in their hair and a ring that the goddess Isis gave them. They are Descendants of Horus. The Sisters have to stop the cult of Anubis from bringing chaos and destruction into the world. If they fail, they will spend eternity with the demons at the edge of chaos.

The series is unfinished due to poor sales.

== The introduction ==
Meri, Sudi, and Dalila are three girls who live in Washington, D.C., but have little else in common. Or so they think. When an ancient magic is revealed, so are their true identities as SISTERS OF ISIS.

== The Sisters of Isis ==
Sudi

Going to high school at Lincoln High, Sudi (starring in The Summoning (Book #1) and The Haunting (Book #4)) is popular and loves to party with her best friend, Sara, who has no idea about Sudi's new life. She has identical twin sisters, Nicole and Carrie, who are three years younger and lives with both of her parents. At first she is reluctant and does not believe in magic but eventually she accepts her fate. In the first book, Brian had broken up with her yet he keeps on showing up whenever she is in trouble. Sudi fears Brian but has not told the other Sisters why. She was born in Nebraska and has blond hair and blue eyes. The animal she can transform into is the Bennu bird. In the third book, Sudi and Scott begin dating. In The Haunting Zack confesses his love to her but she does not know how she feels about him. He said that he only joined the cult because he saw a bird flying over the water and his friends told him that it must be her. He was promised that they would be together. She has the power to move the stars. Her friends, Sara and Brian, find out the truth about who she really is.

Meritaten 'Meri' Stark

A tomboy, Meri (starring in Divine One (Book #2)) accepted her fate sooner than Sudi did. She is from California and her mother is a senator. She was born in Cairo, Egypt and was an orphan before her mother adopted her. She is named after the daughter of the pharaoh Akhenaton and his wife, the famous beauty Nefertiti. She sometimes has body guards but ever since she discovered her identity, she refuses them. She can transform into and understand cats. She goes to Entre Nous Academy. Her mother illegally adopted her because the day she saw Meri, she felt pulled to her by magic. She has a crush on Abdel and they begin an unofficial relationship. Abdel tells Meri that she was the reason he became an Hour priest. Before she moved to D.C., she was in a girl band but her mother's advisors thought it was inappropriate.

Dalila

Was raised by her overprotective Egyptologist uncle, Anwar Serenptah. Her parents died in a cave-in when she was seven. She stars in Enchantress (Book #3). She first thought that she was being prepared to marry a king or prince, not fighting ancient gods. She rejects her fate but is the first to accept it. At first she transformed into Ammut but Abdel said she was supposed to shape-shift into a fire-breathing cobra like the goddess Wadjet. She has a shaved head and her birthmark is above her right temple. As of the second book, her hair was grown out to a pixie cut and hid her marking. Is the most knowledgeable about myths and she can belly dance. She has been protected and home-schooled by her uncle. She dates Sudi's friend Carter but he broke up with her because he had joined the cult. He left her for her protection.

== Books ==
=== Book #1: The Summoning (2007) ===
The Summoning was published in 2007.

In the novel, Sudi is thrilled when she finds a mysterious invitation in her locker. Only one person could have invited her to dinner at Sky Terrace—her not-so-secret crush, Scott. But when she shows up to meet him, things don't go as planned. Instead of Scott, she finds a strange guy named Abdel, with two girls she's never met before. Abdel claims Sudi and the other girls are the descendants of Egyptian pharaohs, powerful ancestors who have given them magical gifts and powers of transformation. At first, Sudi refuses to buy any of it. But when evil forces begin to threaten her world, she has no choice but to believe.

=== Book #2: Divine One (2008) ===
In the novel, now that Meri has moved from California to Washington, D.C., her laid-back lifestyle has been given a makeover. Her nose ring and flip-flops have been replaced with a boring gray-and-blue school uniform for the exclusive and ultra-snooty Entre Nous Academy. With her mom, Senator Stark, deciding to run for her party's presidential nomination, Meri is being forced into the spotlight more than ever. She wants desperately to fulfill her obligations as a Sister of Isis—but have things already spun too far out of her control?

=== Book #3: Enchantress ===
Fifteen-year-old Dalila has never lived a normal life. Homeschooled by her uncle and hopelessly sheltered from the outside world, she's used to being different. Lately, Dalila has discovered she has magical powers of transformation and the ability to cast spells from the Book of Thoth. But when Dalila makes a terrible mistake, she finds herself in a race to recover powerful magic.

=== Book #4: The Haunting ===
Strange things are happening to Sudi. And when her date with her new crush Raul turns into a huge disaster, Sudi can't deny the truth anymore—she's got a ghost on her hands. But instead of being scared, Sudi sees this as an opportunity; it's like having a special pet that can spy for her and play tricks on her nemesis, Michelle. Only this friendly ghost turns out to be not so friendly, and Sudi quickly discovers that it is actually a mut, one of the dangerous dead who tormented the ancient Egyptians. Sudi, Meri, and Dalila are soon caught up in the spirit's brutal plan to wreak havoc in the world. Will the magic of the Sisters of Isis be strong enough to stop it?
