= Outcast Islands =

Two small islands and a number of surrounding rocks in the Palmer Archipelago

- Location within Antarctica

Geography
- Location: Antarctica
- Coordinates: 64°49′S 64°08′W
- Archipelago: Palmer Archipelago

Administration
- Administered under the Antarctic Treaty System

Demographics
- Population: Uninhabited

The Outcast Islands are two small islands, nearly 0.9 km (0.5 nmi) apart, and a number of surrounding rocks lying 3.7 km (2 nmi) southwest of Bonaparte Point, off the southwest coast of Anvers Island in the Palmer Archipelago of Antarctica. The Outcast Islands were named by the United Kingdom Antarctic Place-names Committee (UK-APC) following a survey in 1955 by the Falkland Islands Dependencies Survey (FIDS). The name arose because of their isolated position which is some distance from the other islands in the vicinity of Arthur Harbor.

== See also ==
- Composite Antarctic Gazetteer
- List of Antarctic and sub-Antarctic islands
- List of Antarctic islands south of 60° S
- SCAR
- Territorial claims in Antarctica
