= Lynne Ewing =

American author and screenwriter

Lynne Ewing is an American author and screenwriter who has written 24 young adult novels, including the Daughters of the Moon, Sons of the Dark, and the Sisters of Isis series. Her books have been translated into seven languages.

Her first book, Drive-By (1996), was an ALA Quick Pick for Reluctant Young Adult Readers and a New York Public Library Book for the Teen Age. The book also received the 1999 Arizona Young Readers Award. Her second book, Party Girl (1999), was an ALA Quick Pick for Reluctant Young Adult Readers, an Amazon Editor's Choice, and a Teen People recommended read. The book was adapted into a film titled Living the Life.

Her book The Lure (2014) was an ALA In the Margins 2015 top-ten title for Youths in Custody. In a review of the novel, which she rated as appropriate for high school–age students, Coats compared The Lure to The Outsiders, arguing that "circumstances [of the characters in The Lure] are raw to the power of ten compared to that book".

"Using Urban Fiction to Engage At-Risk and Incarcerated Youths in Literacy Instruction," a study published in 2012, concluded that Drive-By and Party Girl, among a number of other titles, were likely to "engage" reluctant readers among youth at risk for incarceration.

Goddess of the Night (2000), the first volume of the Daughters of the Moon series, was also studied in a book review titled "Girls Transforming: Invisibility and Age-Shifting in Children's Fantasy Fiction Since the 1970s." In this, Lehtonen observes that Goddess of the Night uses the magical power of invisibility as a means to explore the "empowerment" of Vanessa Cleveland, the novel's main character.

Ewing is a member of Sisters in Crime and the Mystery Writers of America.

== Books ==
- Drive-By (HarperCollins, 1996)
- Party Girl (Random House, 1999)
- Daughters of the Moon (Disney Hyperion, 2000–2007)
- Sons of the Dark (Disney Hyperion, 2004–2005)
- Sisters of Isis (Disney Hyperion, 2007–2008)
- The Lure (HarperCollins, 2014)

== Sources ==
- Lehtonen, Sanna (April 26, 2013). Girls Transforming: Invisibility and Age-Shifting in Children's Fantasy Fiction Since the 1970s. McFarland. ISBN 978-1-4766-0193-9.
- Guerra, Stephanie F. (2012). "Using Urban Fiction to Engage At-Risk and Incarcerated Youths in Literacy Instruction". Journal of Adolescent & Adult Literacy. 55 (5): 385–394 at 389–390. doi:10.1002/JAAL.00047. ISSN 1081-3004. JSTOR 41331464.
