= Outcast (1917 film) =

1917 American film by Dell Henderson

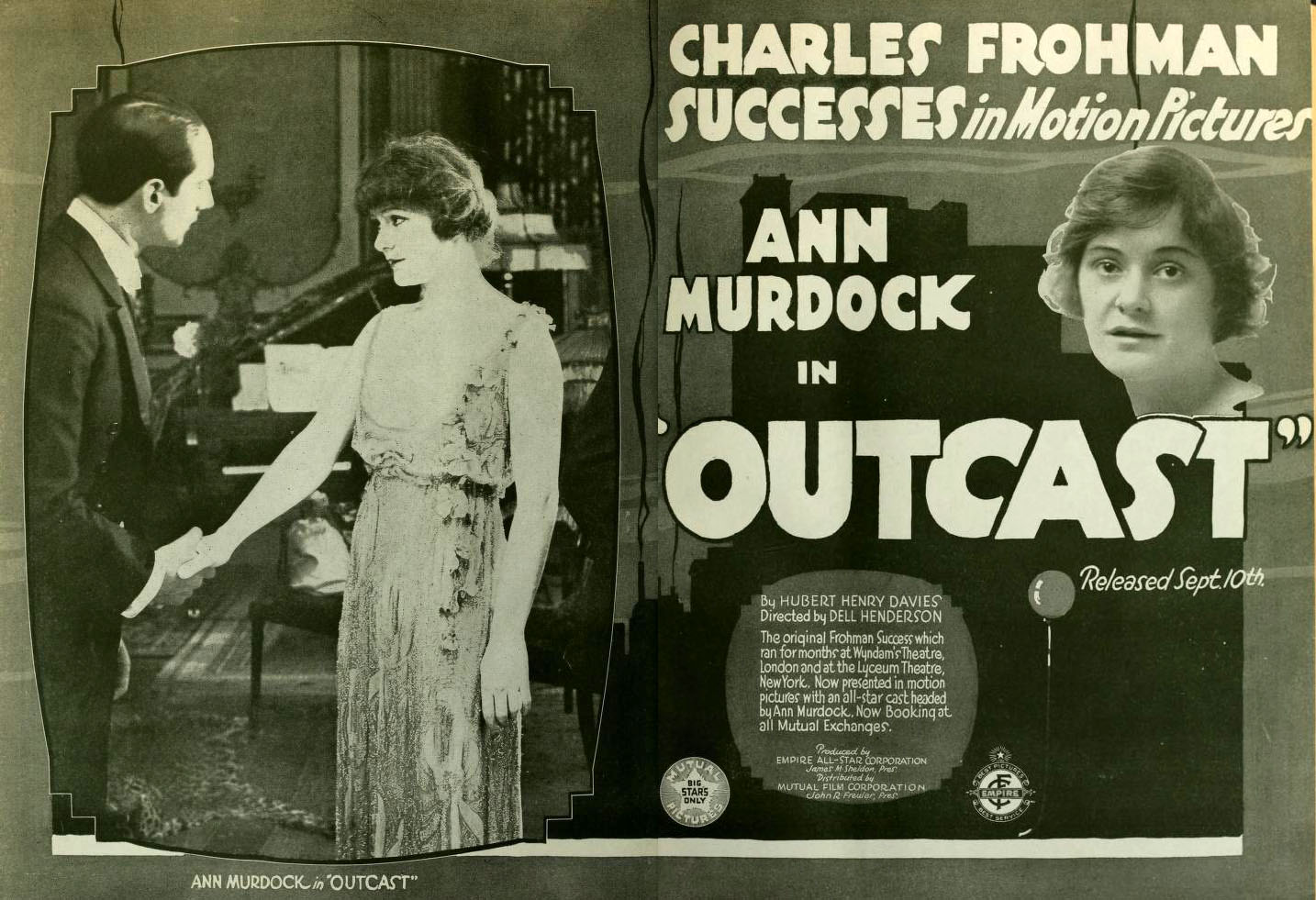
- Advertisement for film
- Directed by: Dell Henderson; Wesley Ruggles (assistant)
- Written by: Anthony Paul Kelly
- Based on: Outcast by Hubert Henry Davies
- Starring: Ann Murdock
- Cinematography: Harry L. Keepers
- Production company: Empire All-Star Corporation
- Distributed by: Mutual Film Corporation
- Release date: September 10, 1917
- Running time: 6 reels
- Country: United States
- Language: Silent (English intertitles)

Outcast (sometimes listed as The Outcast) is a lost 1917 American drama film directed by Dell Henderson and starring Ann Murdock. It was based on the play Outcast by Hubert Henry Davies. It was produced by Empire All-Star Corp., a production unit of the late Charles Frohman who had produced the play starring Elsie Ferguson. Ferguson would reprise the role in a 1922 Paramount film.

== Plot ==
As described in a film magazine, Valentine, engaged to Geoffrey, breaks her engagement so that she can marry Lord Moreland so that she may have everything that she desires. Discouraged, Geoffrey associates with Miriam Gibson, a woman of the streets known as the outcast. Miriam becomes devoted to Geoffrey and does all that is in her power to make him happy. Valentine is jealous because Geoffrey is so happy and believes that by coming into his life she will make it hard for him. Geoffrey, who still loves her, asks her to go away with him to South America, divorce Lord Moreland, and marry him. But Valentine refuses to give up London. So Geoffrey sends Valentine away and marries Miriam, and the two happily set out for their South American home.

== Cast ==
- Ann Murdock - Miriam Gibson
- David Powell - Geoffrey Sherwood
- Catherine Calvert - Valentine
- Richard Hatteras - Hugh
- Jules Raucourt - Tony
- Herbert Ayling - Mr. Guest
- Reginald Carrington - Lord Moreland
- Kate Sergeantson - Mrs. Guest
- H. Ashton Tonge - Taylor
- V. L. Granville - Gerald
- Maud Andrew - Bemish, Miriam's Maid
- James C. Malaidy - Charles Gibson, Miriam's Father
- Charles Hampden - Monsieur Duval
- Zolya Talma - Nelly

== Reception ==
Like many American films of the time, Outcast was subject to cuts by city and state film censorship boards. The Chicago Board of Censors issued an Adults Only permit and required cuts of three gambling scenes and the intertitle "I was driven to the streets, I had no choice."
