= Ann Murdock =

American actress (1890 – 1939)

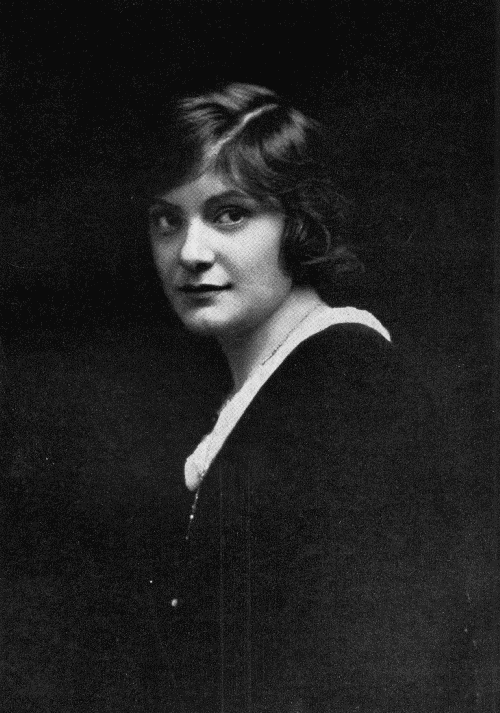
- Murdock in 1916
- Born: Irene Anna Coleman; November 10, 1890; Port Washington, Long Island, New York, U.S.
- Died: April 22, 1939 (aged 48); Lucerne, Switzerland
- Other name: Anna Murdock
- Occupation: Actress
- Years active: 1909–1918
- Spouses: Harry Carson Powers (m. 1924; div. 1926) Hallam Keep Williams (m. 1928–1929) Cavaliere Leone Calleoni (m. 1931)
- Children: 1 daughter, Renee

Ann Murdock (born Irene Anna Coleman; November 10, 1890 – April 22, 1939) was a stage and silent film actress popular during the 1910s. She was sometimes billed as Anna Murdock.

== Career ==
Murdock debuted on stage in The Lion and the Mouse in 1908 in Pittsburgh. She also appeared in The Offenders in New York in 1908. Her Broadway debut came in The Noble Spaniard (1909), and her final Broadway appearance was in The Three Bears (1917).

== Personal life ==
Murdock's private life became public upon the death of Alf Hayman in 1921. Hayman had headed the Frohman theatrical operations after the death of Charles Frohman. When Hayman's will became public, it revealed that the bulk of his multimillion-dollar estate went to Murdock, with no bequests to his wife or his sisters. Hayman's widow expressed no desire to contest the will.

On August 4, 1924, Murdock married Harry Carson Powers in Baltimore, Maryland. They were divorced in Paris on December 13, 1926. Murdock married Hallam Keep Williams on August 28, 1928, in Rye, New York. In May 1929, she sought a divorce from him. On October 14, 1931, she married hotel manager Cavaliere Leone Calleoni in Milan, Italy.

== Filmography ==
- A Royal Family (1915)Survives
- Captain Jinks of the Horse Marines (1916)Lost
- The Seven Deadly Sins (1917)
- Envy (1917)Lost
- Where Love Is (1917)Survives
- The Seventh Sin (1917)Survives
- Outcast (1917)Lost
- The Beautiful Adventure (1917)Lost
- Please Help Emily (1917)Lost
- The Impostor (1918)(*not in LoC catalog)
- My Wife (1918)Lost
- The Richest Girl (1918)Lost

== Gallery ==
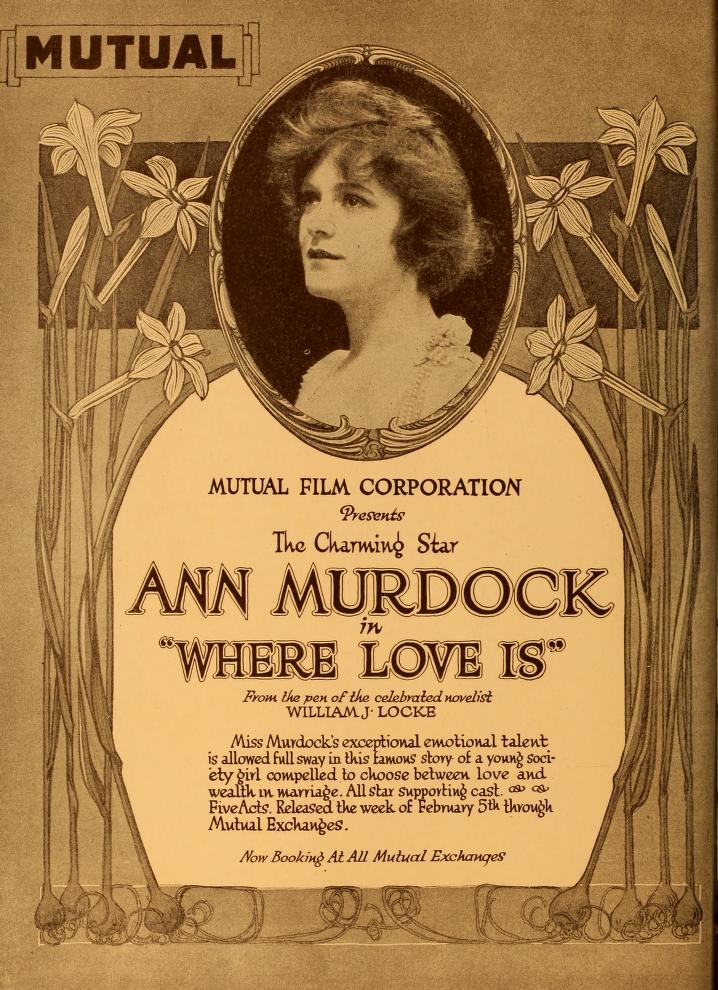
Where Love Is (1917)

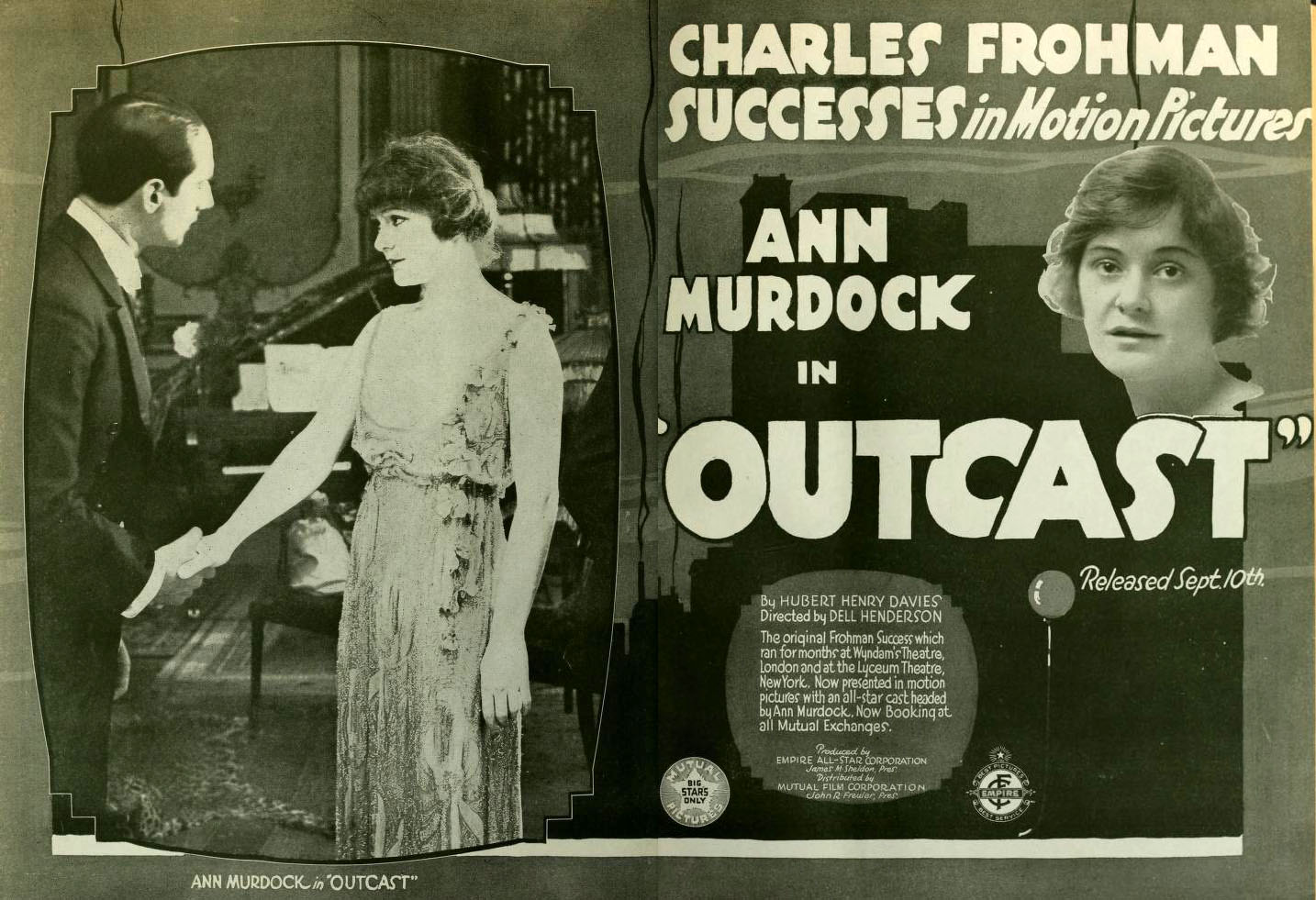
The Outcast (1917)
