= Almost Married =

Almost Married may refer to:

- Almost Married (1919 film), an American comedy-drama directed by Charles Swickard
- Almost Married (1932 film), an American thriller directed by William Cameron Menzies
- Almost Married (1942 film), an American film directed by Charles Lamont
