= Philip Bartholomae =

American playwright, lyricist, screenwriter and theatre director

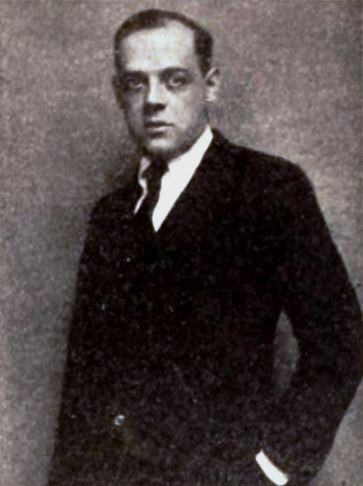

Philip Bartholomae (July 3, 1880 – January 5, 1947) was an American playwright, lyricist, screenwriter, and theatre director. He wrote many plays and musicals which were staged on Broadway in the 1910s and 1920s, several of which were adapted into films with screenplays by Bartholomae. His first successful play was Over Night (1911) which was also the first play he adapted into a film in 1915. His best known stage work, Very Good Eddie (1915), was a musical adaptation of Over Night which Bartholomae created in collaboration with Guy Bolton and composer Jerome Kern. It was a Broadway hit when it premiered, and enjoyed long running revivals on Broadway and the West End in the 1970s. That work received several nominations at the 30th Tony Awards and the 1976 Laurence Olivier Awards.

== Life and career ==
Philip Henry Bartholomae was born in Chicago on July 3, 1880. He graduated from the Rensselaer Polytechnic Institute prior to his career as a playwright.

Bartholomae's first success in the theatre was the play Over Night which was produced on Broadway by William A. Brady. It premiered at Hackett Theatre on January 2, 1911. Bartholomae later adapted this play in collaboration with Guy Bolton into the hit Broadway musical Very Good Eddie (1915) which featured music by Jerome Kern. Prior to this Bartholomae had penned the book and lyrics to the Broadway musicals When Dreams Come True (1913) and Miss Daisy (1914) with composer Silvio Hein. His other early stage works on the New York stage include the plays Little Miss Brown (1913) and Kiss Me Quick (1913), and the musicals Over the Top (1917), Girl o' Mine (1918), and The Greenwich Village Follies of 1919.

For his 1921 musical Tangerine, Bartholomae collaborated with Guy Bolton once again to create a book out of an earlier play he had created with the playwright Lawrence Langner. This was followed by the plays Personality (1921) and Barnum Was Right (1923), and his final musical, Kitty's Kisses (1926). His last new stage work to appear on Broadway was the play To-Morrow (1928). A Broadway revival of his musical Very Good Eddie starring Charles Repole in a Tony Award nominated performance had a long run at the Booth Theatre in 1975–1976. The musical also had a long running production in the West End at the Piccadilly Theatre in 1975 starring Prue Clarke. The 1975 West End production was nominated for the Laurence Olivier Award for Best New Musical; making Bartholomae a posthumous nominee for that award.

Bartholomae died on January 5, 1947, in Winnetka, Illinois.

== Musicals ==
- All Night Long starring Madge Kennedy

== Partial filmography ==
- The Serpent (1916)
- The Cigarette Girl (1917)
- The Mark of Cain (1917)
- The Streets of Illusion (1917)
- Stranded in Arcady (1917)
- Sylvia of the Secret Service (1917)
- The Other Woman (1918)
- The Black Panther's Cub (1921)
- Barnum Was Right (1929)

== Bibliography ==
- Dan Dietz (2015). "Very Good Eddie". The Complete Book of 1970s Broadway Musicals. Rowman & Littlefield Publishers. ISBN 9781442251663.
- James Fisher, Felicia Hardison Londré (2017). "Bartholomae, Philip". Historical Dictionary of American Theater: Modernism. Rowman & Littlefield. pp. 68–69. ISBN 9781538107867.
- James Fisher, Felicia Hardison Londré (2009). "Bartholomae, Philip H.". The A to Z of American Theater: Modernism. Scarecrow Press. ISBN 9780810868847.
- Kurt Gänzl (2001). "Bartholomae, Philip". The Encyclopedia of the Musical Theatre: A-Gi. Schirmer Books. ISBN 9780028655727.
- Thomas S. Hischak (2009). Broadway Plays and Musicals: Descriptions and Essential Facts of More Than 14,000 Shows Through 2007. McFarland & Company. ISBN 9780786453092.
- Granville Forbes Sturgis (1913). The Influence of the Drama. Shakespeare Press.
