= Miss Nobody =

Miss Nobody may refer to:

- Miss Nobody (1917 film), a silent film drama directed by William Parke
- Miss Nobody (1920 film), an American silent film starring Billie Rhodes
- Miss Nobody (1926 film), an American silent film starring Anna Q. Nilsson
- Miss Nobody (1996 film), a.k.a. Panna Nikt, a Polish film
- Miss Nobody (2010 film), an American film starring Leslie Bibb
