= The Last of the Carnabys =

- Directed by: William Parke
- Written by: Sam Morse; George B. Seitz
- Starring: Gladys Hulette; J.H. Gilmour; Helene Chadwick
- Cinematography: Albert Richard
- Production company: Astra Film
- Distributed by: Pathé Exchange
- Release date: July 22, 1917
- Running time: 50 minutes
- Country: United States
- Languages: Silent; English intertitles

The Last of the Carnabys is a 1917 American silent drama film directed by William Parke and starring Gladys Hulette, William Parke Jr., and Eugenie Woodward.

== Cast ==
- Gladys Hulette as Lucy Carnaby
- William Parke Jr. as Gordon Carnaby
- Eugenie Woodward as Lucy's mother
- Paul Everton as Charles Etheridge
- Harry Benham as Johnn Rand
- J.H. Gilmour as Butler
- Helene Chadwick as The Kept Woman

== Bibliography ==
- Donald W. McCaffrey & Christopher P. Jacobs. Guide to the Silent Years of American Cinema. Greenwood Publishing, 1999. ISBN 0-313-30345-2
