= The Cigarette Girl =

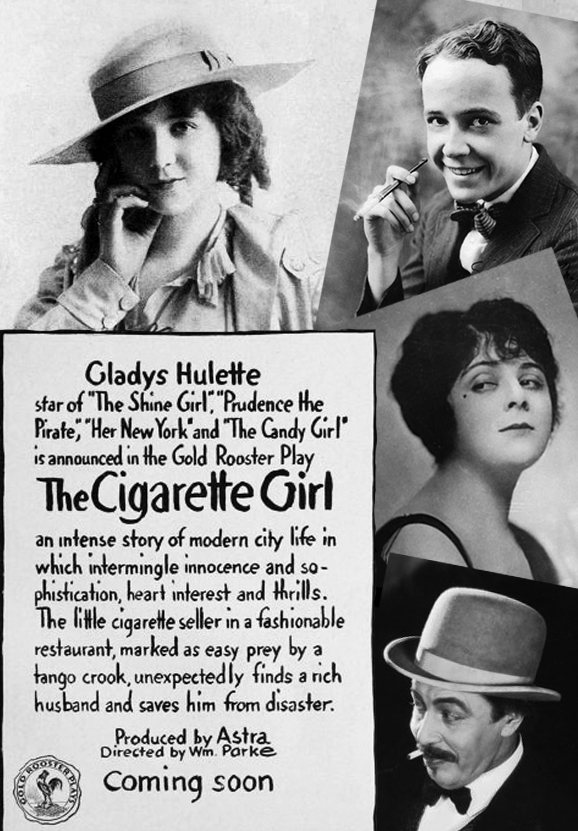
- Directed by: William Parke
- Written by: Philip Bartholomae
- Starring: Gladys Hulette; Warner Oland; William Parke Jr.
- Production company: Astra Film Corp
- Distributed by: Pathé Exchange
- Release date: July 8, 1917
- Country: United States
- Languages: Silent; English intertitles

The Cigarette Girl is a 1917 American silent drama film directed by William Parke and starring Gladys Hulette, Warner Oland and William Parke Jr.

== Cast ==
- Gladys Hulette as The cigarette girl
- Warner Oland as Mr. Wilson
- William Parke Jr. as Money Meredith
- Florence Hamilton as Mrs. Wilson
- Billy Sullivan

== Bibliography ==
- Jean-Marc Lehu. Branded Entertainment: Product Placement and Brand Strategy in the Entertainment Business. Kogan Page Publishers, 2007.
