= Prudence the Pirate =

1916 silent film directed by William Parke

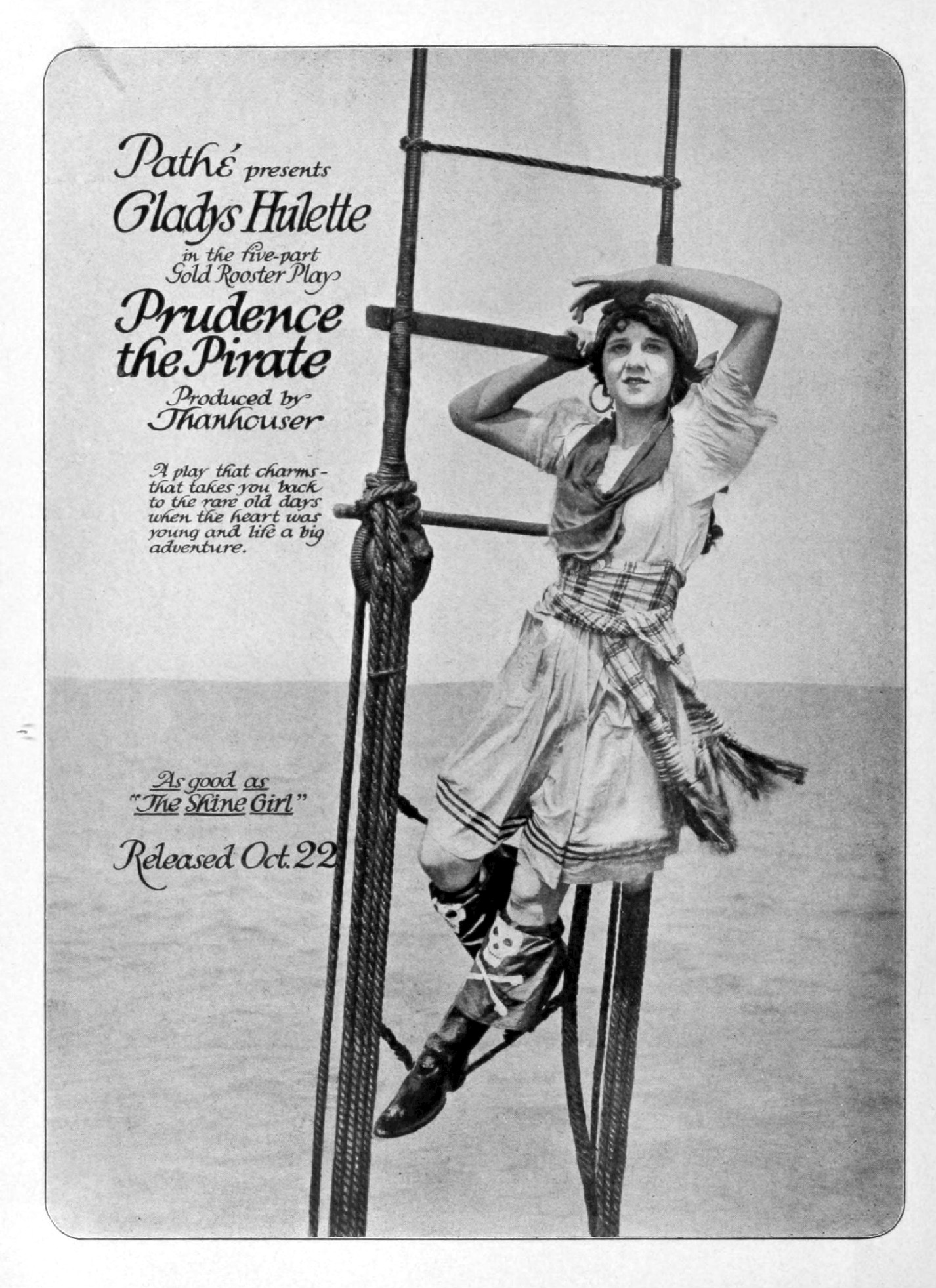
- Advertisement in Moving Picture World
- Directed by: William Parke; Gordon Hollingshead
- Written by: Agnes Christine Johnston
- Produced by: Thanhouser Company
- Starring: Gladys Hulette
- Cinematography: John Bauman
- Distributed by: Pathé Exchange
- Release date: October 22, 1916
- Running time: 5 reels
- Country: United States
- Language: Silent (English intertitles)

Prudence the Pirate is a lost 1916 American silent comedy-drama film directed by William Parke and starring Gladys Hulette. It was produced by Thanhouser Company's Gold Rooster Plays and released through Pathé Exchange.

== Cast ==
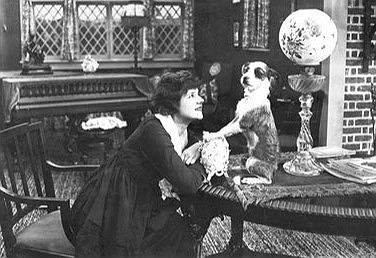
Gladys Hulette and Panthus

- Gladys Hulette as Prudence
- Flora Finch as Aunty
- William Parke Jr. as Tommy
- Barnett Parker as John Astorbilt
- A. J. Andrews
- The Ugliest Dog in the World as Panthus (this credit per AFI)
