= The Referee (1922 film) =

1922 silent film

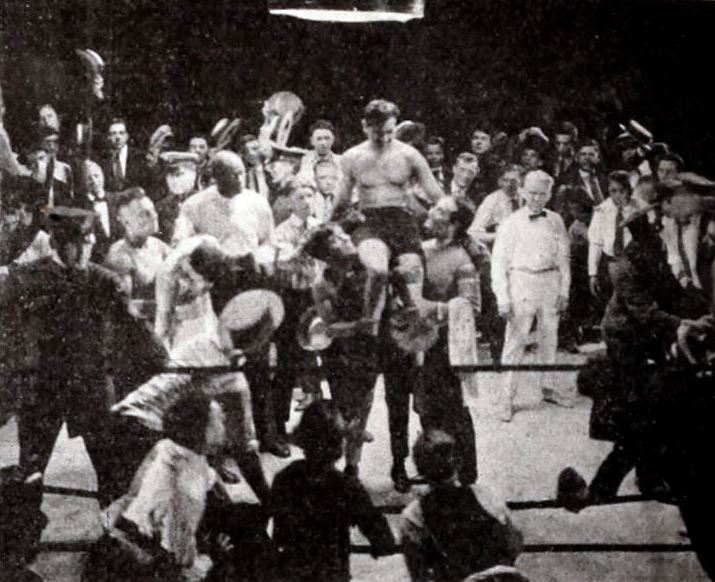
- Directed by: Ralph Ince
- Written by: Gerald Beaumont (story); Lewis Allen Browne
- Produced by: Lewis J. Selznick
- Starring: Conway Tearle; Anders Randolf; Gladys Hulette
- Cinematography: William F. Wagner
- Production company: Selznick Pictures
- Distributed by: Select Pictures
- Release date: May 10, 1922
- Running time: 50 minutes
- Country: United States
- Languages: Silent; English intertitles

The Referee is a 1922 American silent sports drama film directed by Ralph Ince and starring Conway Tearle, Anders Randolf and Gladys Hulette.

== Cast ==
- Conway Tearle as John McArdle
- Anders Randolf as Steve Roberts
- Gladys Hulette as Janie Roberts
- Gus Platz as Fighter
- Frank Ryan as Fighter
- Joe Humphries as Announcer
- Patsy Haley as Referee

== Bibliography ==
- Goble, Alan. The Complete Index to Literary Sources in Film. Walter de Gruyter, 1999.
