= The Whirlpool (1918 film) =

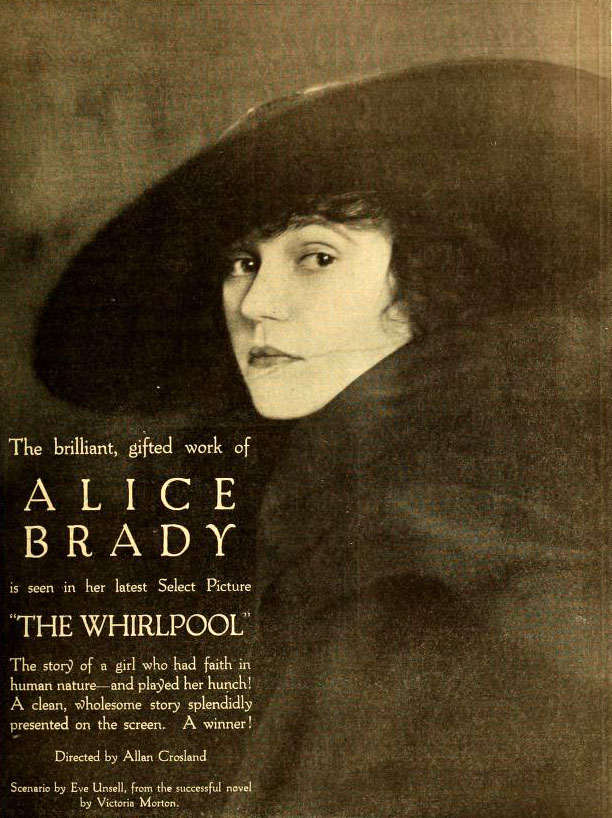
- Directed by: Alan Crosland
- Written by: Eve Unsell
- Based on: The Whirlpool; 1916 novel by Victoria Morton
- Starring: Alice Brady; Holmes Herbert; William B. Davidson
- Cinematography: William Marshall
- Production company: Select Pictures
- Distributed by: Select Pictures
- Release date: June 30, 1918
- Running time: 50 minutes
- Country: United States
- Languages: Silent; English intertitles

The Whirlpool is a 1918 American silent crime film directed by Alan Crosland and starring Alice Brady, Holmes Herbert and William B. Davidson.

== Plot summary ==
The film revolves around a young man named Richard Brettner, who commits a robbery to attract the attention of Miss Bella Cavello, who is forced to work at her stepfather's casino. Things escalate, and Richard is later arrested for murder, as part of a complex plot involving blackmail, hypnosis, and concealing identities.

== Cast ==
- Alice Brady as Isabele Corbyn, aka Bella Cavello
- Holmes Herbert as Judge Reverton
- J.H. Gilmour as Ferris
- William B. Davidson as Arthur Hallam
- Robert Walker as Richard Brettner
- Warren Cook as Colonel Warren
- W.E. Williams as Dr. Comyns
- Louise Lee as Mrs. Danzart
- Virginia Lee as Miss Danzart
- Mabel Guilford as Nurse
- Wallace Clarke as Butler
- H. Van Beusen as Detective
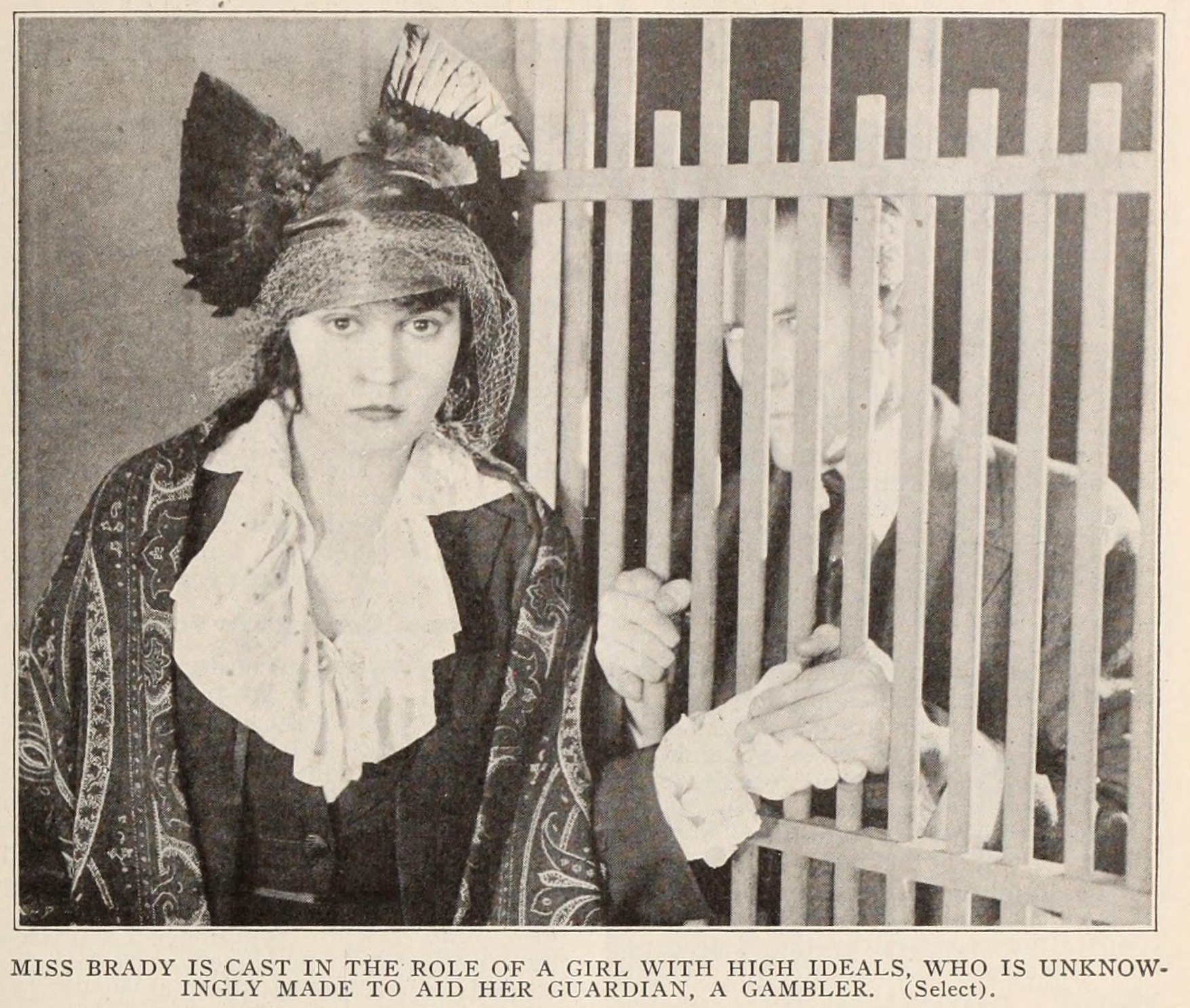
- Alice Brady
  Joseph Burke as Guide

== Bibliography ==
- Goble, Alan. The Complete Index to Literary Sources in Film. Walter de Gruyter, 1999.
