= The Night Owl (1926 film) =

1926 film

- Directed by: Harry Joe Brown
- Written by: Henry Roberts Symonds
- Produced by: Harry Joe Brown; W. Ray Johnston
- Starring: Reed Howes; Gladys Hulette; Joseph W. Girard
- Cinematography: William H. Tuers
- Production company: Harry J. Brown Productions
- Distributed by: Rayart Pictures
- Release date: December 30, 1926
- Running time: 50 minutes
- Country: United States
- Languages: Silent; English intertitles

The Night Owl is a 1926 American silent action film directed by Harry Joe Brown and starring Reed Howes, Gladys Hulette and Joseph W. Girard.

== Synopsis ==
Frustrated that his son spends all his time in nightclubs, his wealthy father arranges for a gang to kidnap him to teach him a lesson. However the gang turn the tables on him and kidnap him for real. With the assistance of a cigarette girl tied up with his abductors, he struggles to free himself.

== Cast ==
- Reed Howes as Larry Armitage
- Gladys Hulette as Mary Jackson
- Harold Austin as Jimmy Jackson
- Joseph W. Girard as William Armittage
- David Kirby as Harlem Red
- Jim Mason as Gentleman Joe

== Bibliography ==
- Connelly, Robert B. The Silents: Silent Feature Films, 1910-36, Volume 40, Issue 2. December Press, 1998.
