= J. H. Gilmour =

Former Canadian film actor

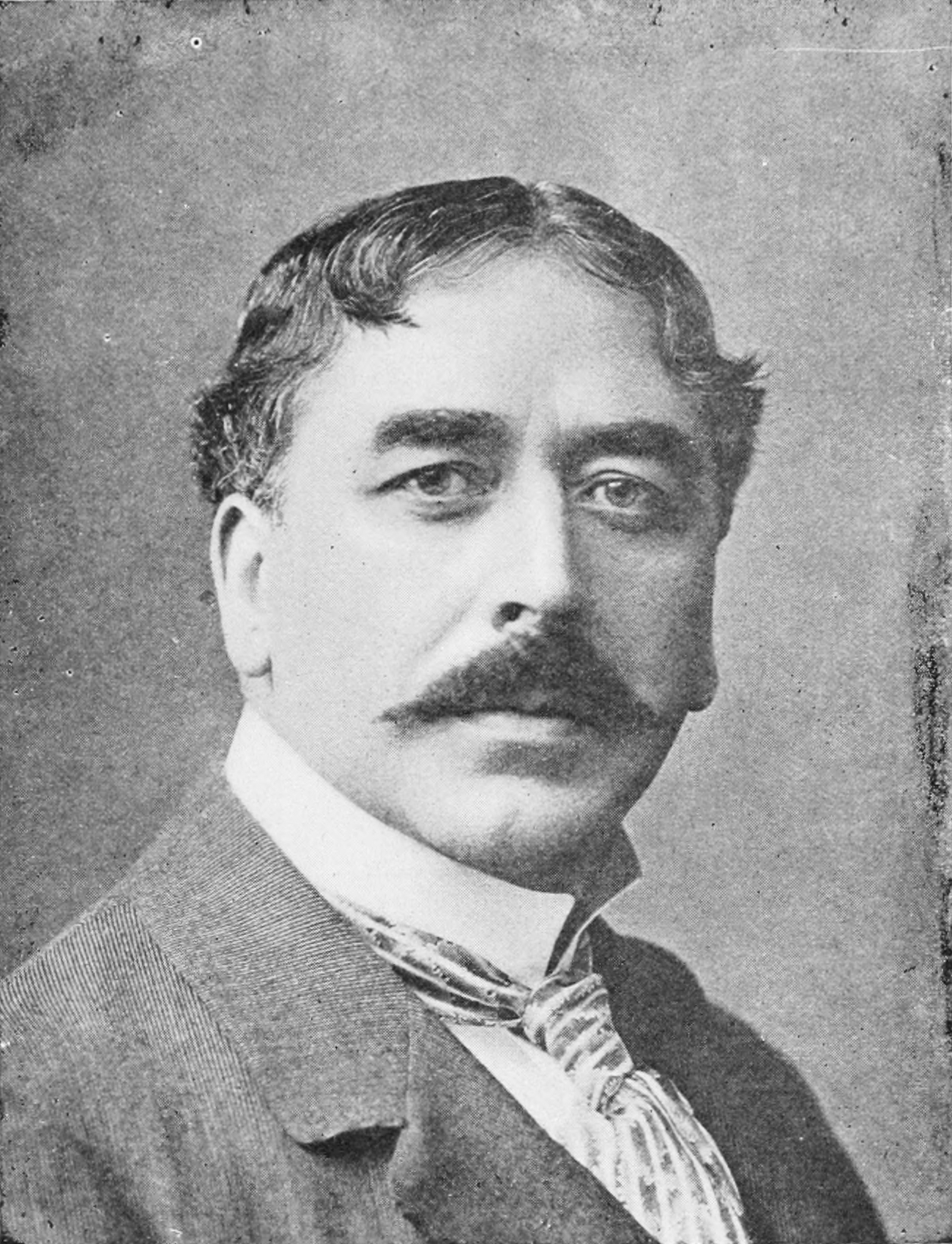
- Born: 1857; Ottawa, Canada West
- Died: November 24, 1922 (aged 64–65); Yonkers, New York, U.S.
- Occupation: Actor
- Years active: 1909-1921 (film)

John H. Gilmour (1857–1922) was a Canadian stage and film actor. He was a member of the summer stock cast at Denver's Elitch Theatre in 1904 and 1906, including a performance of The Crisis, based on the book by Winston Churchill with Maude Fealy and a young Denver native named Douglas Fairbanks.

== Selected filmography ==
- Sylvia of the Secret Service (1917)
- Over the Hill (1917)
- The Streets of Illusion (1917)
- Her Beloved Enemy (1917)
- The Last of the Carnabys (1917)
- The Mark of Cain (1917)
- A Crooked Romance (1917)
- The Candy Girl (1917)
- Waifs (1918)
- The Whirlpool (1918)
- The Naulahka (1918)

== Bibliography ==
- Langman, Larry. American Film Cycles: The Silent Era. Greenwood Publishing, 1998.
