= The Streets of Illusion =

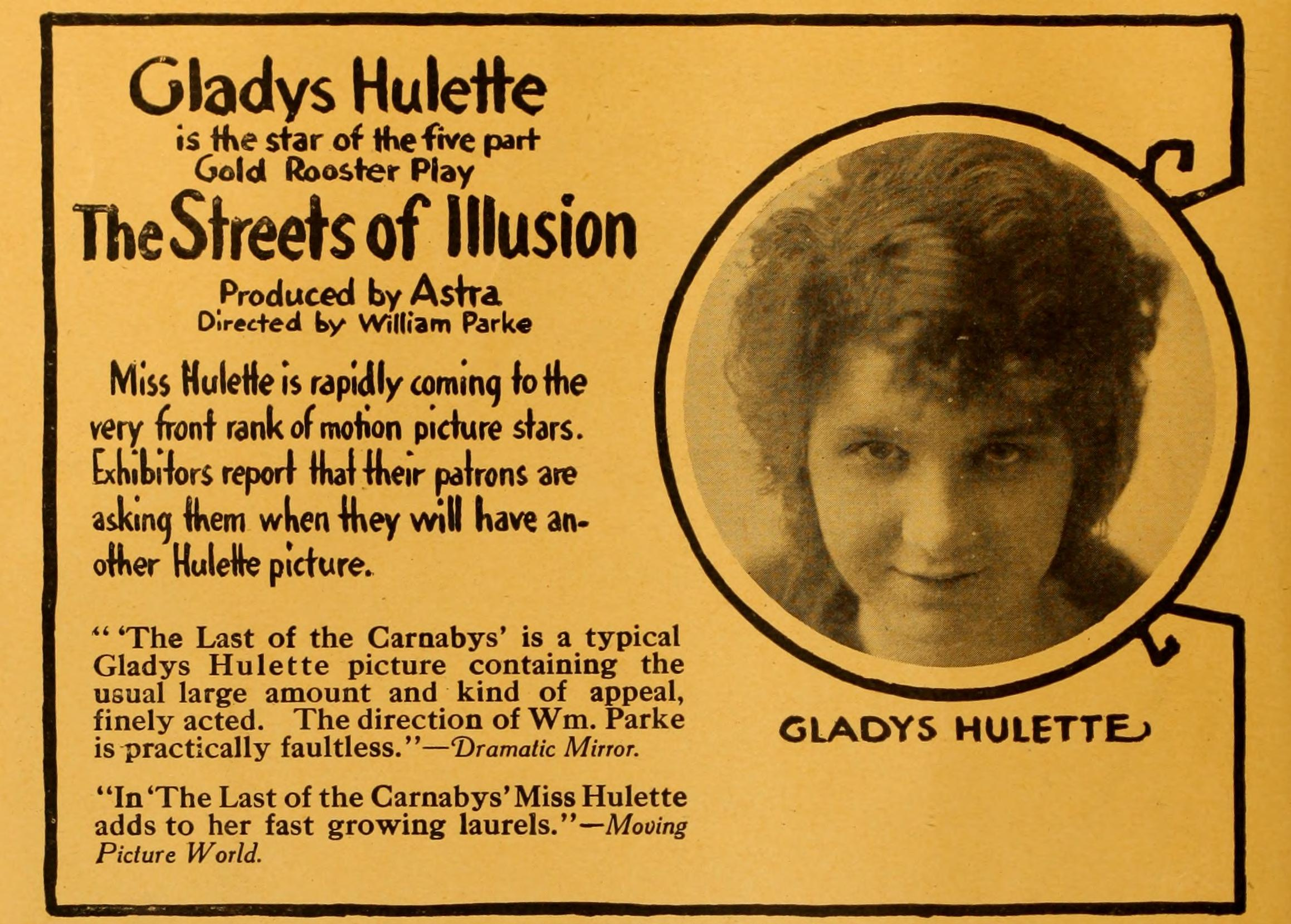
- Advertisement from Moving Picture World
- Directed by: William Parke
- Written by: Philip Bartholomae; Andrew Soutar
- Starring: Gladys Hulette; J.H. Gilmour; Richard Barthelmess
- Cinematography: Albert Richard
- Production company: Astra Film
- Distributed by: Pathé Exchange
- Release date: August 12, 1917
- Running time: 50 minutes
- Country: United States
- Languages: Silent; English intertitles

The Streets of Illusion is a 1917 American silent drama film directed by William Parke and starring Gladys Hulette, J.H. Gilmour and Richard Barthelmess.

== Cast ==
- Gladys Hulette as Beam
- J.H. Gilmour as Her Father
- William Parke Jr. as Her Brother
- Richard Barthelmess as Donald Morton
- William Dudley as Colonel Thompson
- Warren Cook as His Father
- Kathryn Adams

== Bibliography ==
- Craig W. Campbell. Reel America and World War I: A Comprehensive Filmography and History of Motion Pictures in the United States, 1914-1920. McFarland, 1985.
