= The Mark of Cain (1917 film) =

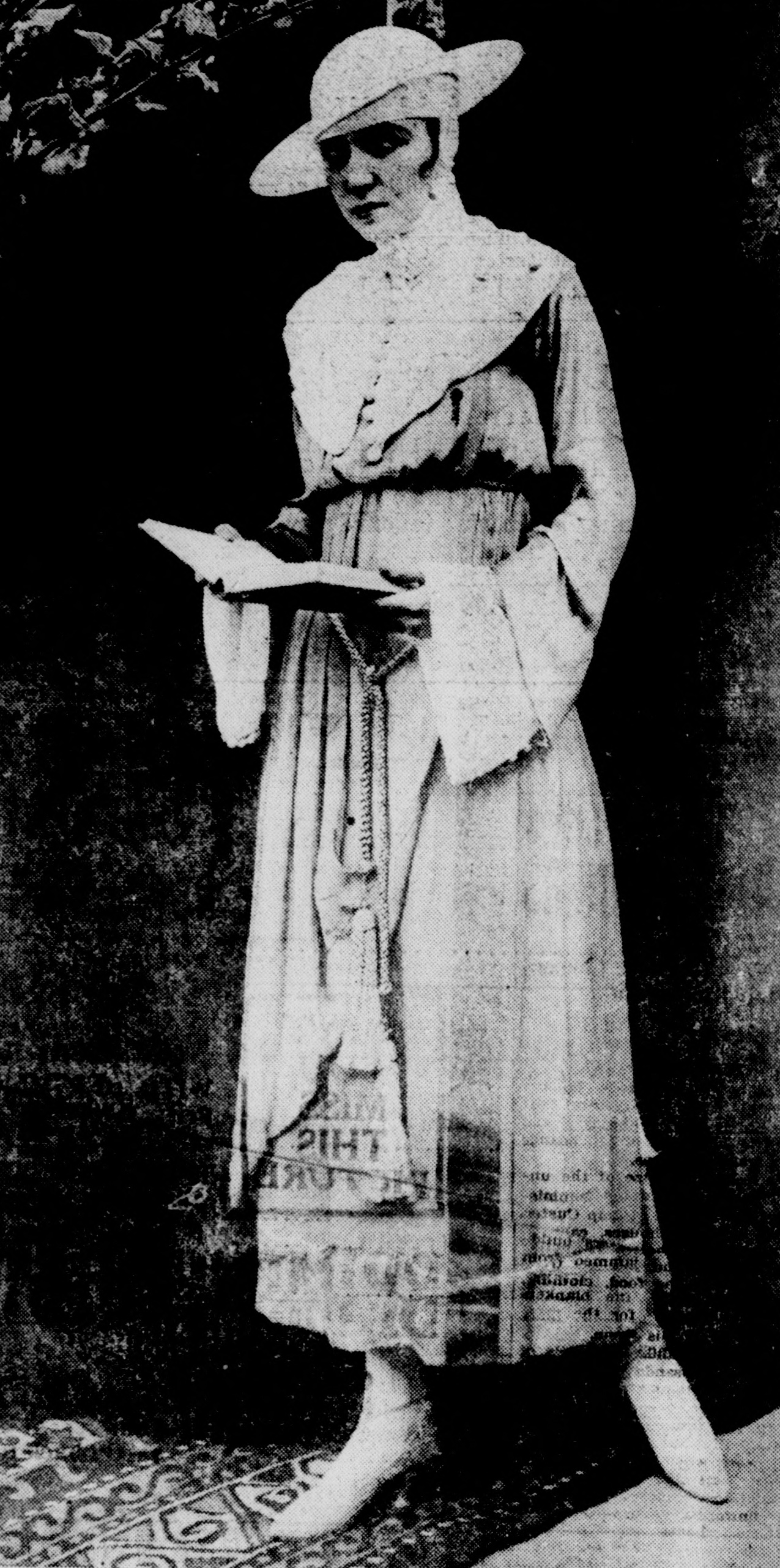
- Newspaper publicity photo of Irene Castle for the film
- Directed by: George Fitzmaurice
- Written by: Philip Bartholomae; Carolyn Wells
- Starring: Antonio Moreno; Irene Castle; J.H. Gilmour
- Cinematography: Arthur C. Miller
- Production company: Astra Film
- Distributed by: Pathé Exchange
- Release date: November 4, 1917
- Running time: 50 minutes
- Country: United States
- Languages: Silent; English intertitles

The Mark of Cain is a 1917 American silent mystery film directed by George Fitzmaurice and starring Antonio Moreno, Irene Castle and J.H. Gilmour.

It was shot at studios in Fort Lee in New Jersey. The film's sets were designed by the art director William Cameron Menzies.

== Cast ==
- Antonio Moreno as Kane Langdon
- Irene Castle as Alice
- J.H. Gilmour as Trowbridge
- Eleanor Black as Housekeeper
- John St. Polis as Judge Hoyt

== Bibliography ==
- Koszarski, Richard . Fort Lee: The Film Town (1904-2004). Indiana University Press, 2005.
