= Sylvia of the Secret Service =

1917 film by George Fitzmaurice

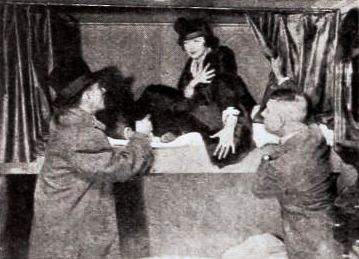
- Scene featuring Castle and von Stroheim
- Directed by: George Fitzmaurice
- Written by: Philip Bartholomae; Joseph H. Trant
- Starring: Irene Castle; J.H. Gilmour; Elliott Dexter
- Cinematography: Arthur C. Miller
- Production company: Astra Film
- Distributed by: Pathé Exchange
- Release date: November 25, 1917
- Running time: 50 minutes
- Country: United States
- Languages: Silent; English intertitles

Sylvia of the Secret Service is a 1917 American silent thriller film directed by George Fitzmaurice and starring Irene Castle, J.H. Gilmour and Elliott Dexter. Erich von Stroheim worked as assistant director and technical advisor as well as playing the role of the villain. It was given a second release in 1922.

The film's sets were designed by the art director Anton Grot. It was shot at studios in Fort Lee in New Jersey.

== Synopsis ==
During World War I, an American secret agent attempt to prevent a German sabotage ring from blowing up ammunition dumps in New York.

== Cast ==
- Irene Castle as Sylvia
- J.H. Gilmour as Van Brunn
- Elliott Dexter as Curtis Prescott
- Suzanne Willa as Fay Walling
- J.W. Percival as Hemming
- Erich von Stroheim as The villain

== Bibliography ==
- Koszarski, Richard . Fort Lee: The Film Town (1904-2004). Indiana University Press, 2005.
- Lennig, Arthur. Stroheim. University Press of Kentucky, 2004.
