= How Women Love =

1922 silent film

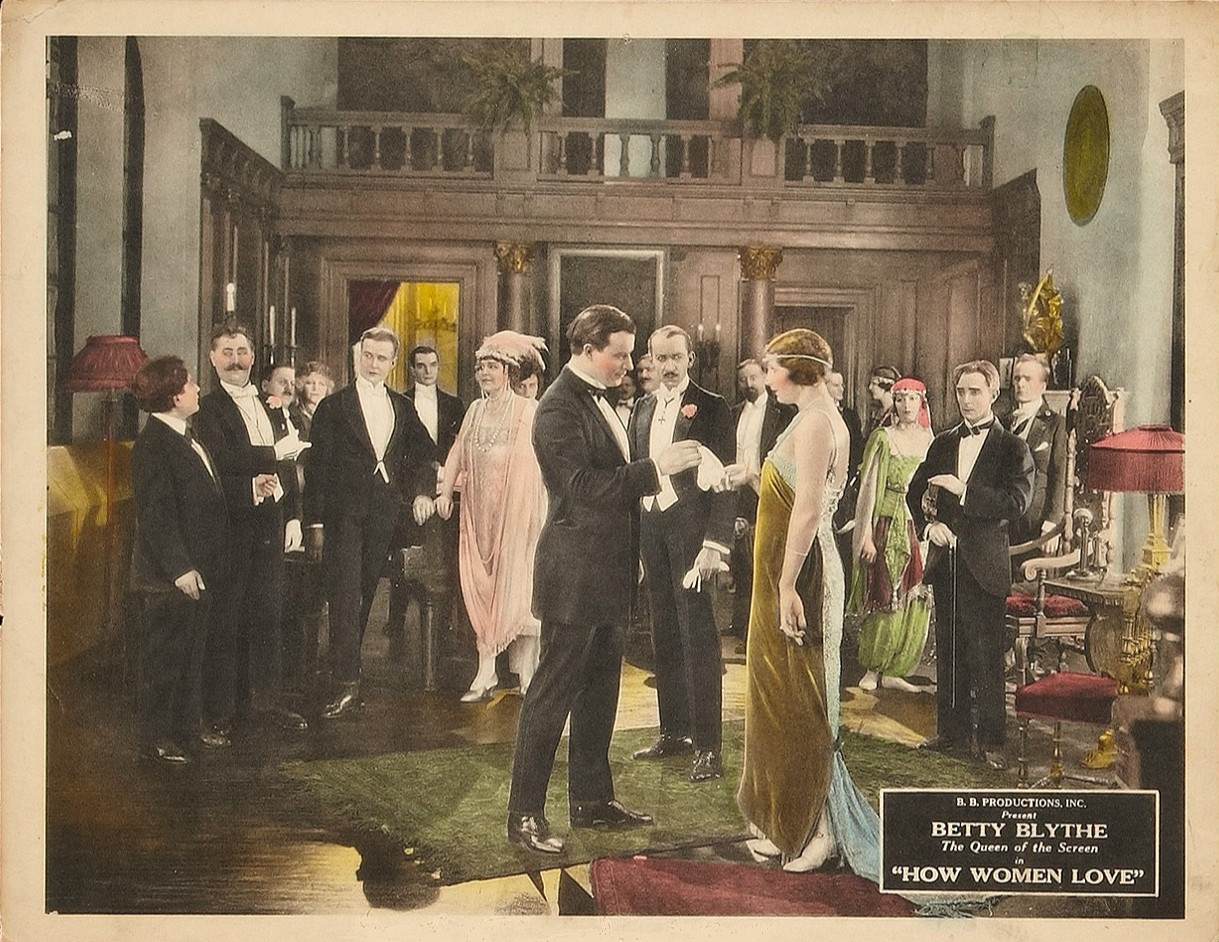
- Directed by: Kenneth S. Webb
- Written by: Izola Forrester (novel); Dorothy Farnun; George Farnum
- Produced by: Whitman Bennett
- Starring: Betty Blythe; Gladys Hulette; Julia Swayne Gordon
- Cinematography: Edward Paul; Harry Stradling Sr.
- Production company: Betty Blythe Productions
- Distributed by: States Rights
- Release date: October 15, 1922
- Running time: 60 minutes
- Country: United States
- Languages: Silent; English intertitles

How Women Love is a 1922 American silent drama film directed by Kenneth S. Webb and starring Betty Blythe, Gladys Hulette and Julia Swayne Gordon.

== Plot ==
A promising singer his signed up by a backer for the new opera he is producing, but lays down the condition that she must not fall in love and distract herself. However, she soon develops an attachment for a composer.

== Cast ==
- Betty Blythe as Rosa Roma
- Gladys Hulette as Natalie Nevins
- Julia Swayne Gordon as Mrs. Nevins
- Katherine Stewart as Nana
- Jane Thomas as Peasant Sweetheart
- Anna Ames as Olga
- Robert Frazer as Griffith Ames
- Charles Lane as Ogden Ward
- Henry Sedley as Count Jurka
- Signor N. Salerno as Jacobelli
- Harry Sothern as Dmitri Kavec
- Templar Saxe as Casanova
- Charles Byer as Peasant Lover
- George Majeroni as The Tenor

== Bibliography ==
- Munden, Kenneth White. The American Film Institute Catalog of Motion Pictures Produced in the United States, Part 1. University of California Press, 1997.
