= William Parke (director) =

American film director

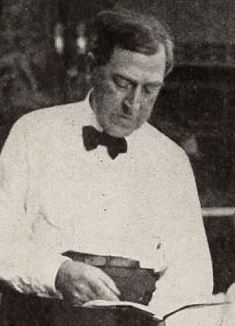
- Born: January 17, 1873; Bethlehem, Pennsylvania, United States
- Died: July 28, 1941 (aged 68); New York City, United States
- Occupation: Director
- Years active: 1915-1924 (film)

William Parke (1873–1941) was an American film director of the silent era.

== Selected filmography ==
- Prudence the Pirate (1916)
- Other People's Money (1916)
- The Shine Girl (1916)
- The Last of the Carnabys (1917)
- Miss Nobody (1917)
- The Cigarette Girl (1917)
- A Crooked Romance (1917)
- The Streets of Illusion (1917)
- The Mystery of the Double Cross (1917)
- Over the Hill (1917)
- Convict 993 (1918)
- The Yellow Ticket (1918)
- A Woman Who Understood (1920)
- The Paliser Case (1920)
- Out of the Storm (1920)
- Beach of Dreams (1921)
- Legally Dead (1923)
- The Clean Up (1923)
- A Million to Burn (1923)

== Bibliography ==
- Munden, Kenneth White. The American Film Institute Catalog of Motion Pictures Produced in the United States, Part 1. University of California Press, 1997.
