= Go Straight (1925 film) =

1925 film

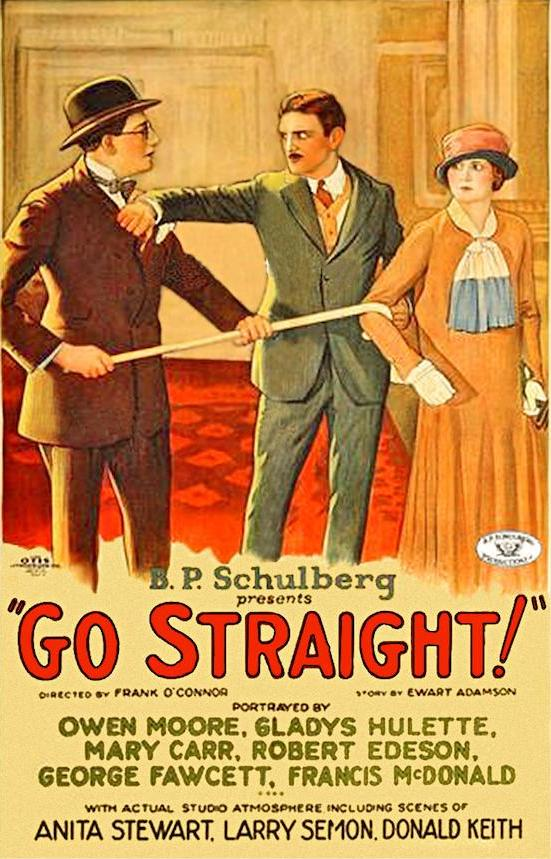
- Directed by: Frank O'Connor
- Written by: Ewart Adamson (story); Agnes Brand Leahy
- Starring: Owen Moore; Mary Carr; Gladys Hulette
- Cinematography: Harry Perry
- Production company: B.P. Schulberg Productions
- Distributed by: Preferred Pictures
- Release date: April 27, 1925
- Running time: 60 minutes
- Country: United States
- Language: Silent (English intertitles)

Go Straight is a 1925 American silent crime drama film directed by Frank O'Connor and starring Owen Moore, Mary Carr, and Gladys Hulette. Some scenes took place in a film studio, with real stars Anita Stewart and Larry Semon appearing as themselves.

== Plot ==
As described in a film magazine review, Gilda Hart, woman member of a gang of robbers, decides to go straight, and is called yellow by the gang. Her aunt moves to the Coast. Gilda gets a job at a bank and wins the approval of her employer by detecting some counterfeit bills. The Dove, a member of the gang who loves her, brings the gang to the Coast where they find her. They try to persuade her to assist in robbing the bank, but she refuses. On the night of the robbery, she goes to the bank, takes the money, and returns to her employer's home. While she is gone, the gang goes to the bank, find the banker and bind him and carry him away in an effort to make him tell them where the money is hidden. Gilda goes to the gang to see where her employer is. She is in the room when the Detective and his aides arrive. She is accused of being an accomplice, but is given a clean record when the banker's mother tells them that Gilda had saved the money. The banker and the young woman then decide to "go straight" to see a minister.

== Cast ==
- Owen Moore as John Rhodes
- Mary Carr as Mrs. Rhodes
- George Fawcett as Madison
- Ethel Wales as Mamie
- Gladys Hulette as Gilda Hart
- Lillian Leighton as Gilda's Aunt
- Robert Edeson as The Hawk
- DeWitt Jennings as The Hunter
- Francis McDonald as The Dove
- Anita Stewart as Self
- Larry Semon as Self

== Bibliography ==
- Connelly, Robert B. The Silents: Silent Feature Films, 1910-36, Volume 40, Issue 2. December Press, 1998.
- Munden, Kenneth White. The American Film Institute Catalog of Motion Pictures Produced in the United States, Part 1. University of California Press, 1997.
