= A Crooked Romance =

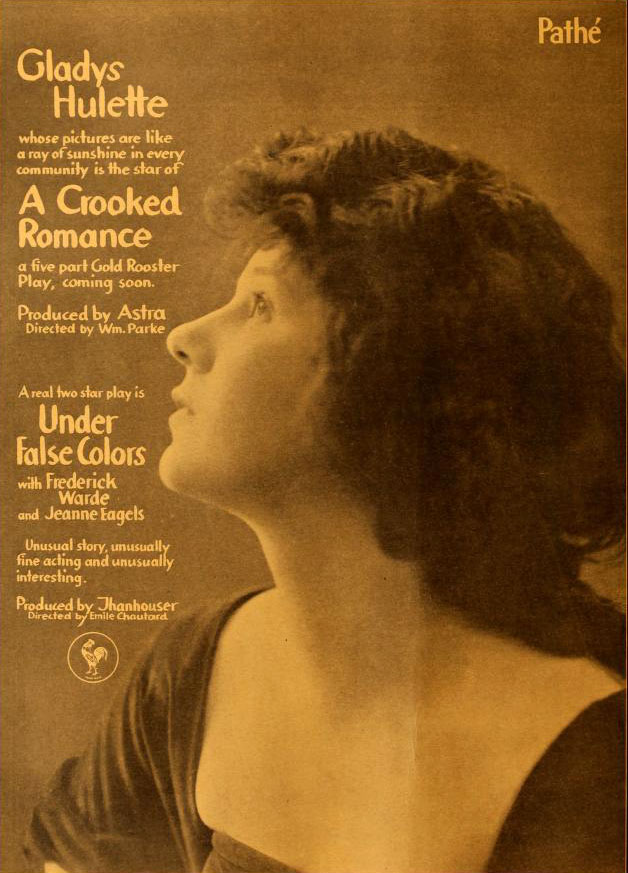
- Directed by: William Parke
- Written by: Tom Cushing; Will M. Ritchey; Marc Edmund Jones
- Starring: Gladys Hulette; Paul Clerget; William Parke Jr.
- Cinematography: Albert Richard
- Production company: Astra Film
- Distributed by: Pathé Exchange
- Release date: September 30, 1917
- Country: United States
- Languages: Silent; English intertitles

A Crooked Romance is a 1917 American silent drama film directed by William Parke and starring Gladys Hulette, Paul Clerget and William Parke Jr.

It was shot at studios in Fort Lee in New Jersey.

== Cast ==
- Gladys Hulette as Mary Flynn
- Paul Clerget as Sid Flynn
- William Parke Jr. as Gifford Cannon
- J.H. Gilmour as Mike
- James E. Sullivan

== Bibliography ==
- Paul C. Spehr. The Movies Begin: Making Movies in New Jersey, 1887-1920. Newark Museum, 1977.
