= Very Good Eddie =

Musical by Jerome Kern, Guy Bolton, Philip Bartholomae, and Schuyler Greene

- London production.
- Music: Jerome Kern
- Lyrics: Schuyler Greene
- Book: Philip Bartholomae; Guy Bolton
- Basis: Over Night (1911) by Philip Bartholomae
- Productions: 1915 Broadway; 1918 West End; 1975 Broadway revival 1976 West End; 1976 US National Tour

Very Good Eddie is a musical with a book by Guy Bolton and Philip Bartholomae, music by Jerome Kern, and lyrics by Schuyler Greene, with additional lyrics by Elsie Janis, Herbert Reynolds, Harry B. Smith, John E. Hazzard, Ring Lardner and Jerome Kern, and additional music by Henry Kailimai. The story was based on the farce Over Night by Bartholomae. The farcical plot concerns three couples and a sex-crazed voice teacher who board a Hudson River Day Line boat in Poughkeepsie, New York. Chaos ensues when two of the couples cross paths and accidentally trade partners. The vaudeville-style adventure continues at a hotel, where guests pop in and out of rooms while an inebriated desk clerk tries to sort through the madness.

The show was the second of the series of "Princess Theatre musicals" and was a hit for Bolton and Kern, running for 341 performances and leading to revivals and further successful collaborations.

== Background ==
Early in the 20th century, American musical theatre consisted of a mix of elaborate European operettas, like The Merry Widow (1907), British musical comedy imports, like The Arcadians (1910), George M. Cohan's shows, the operettas of Victor Herbert, and the spectacular revues of Florenz Ziegfeld. But as Cohan's and Herbert's creative output waned, new creative talent was being nurtured on Broadway, including Jerome Kern, Irving Berlin and Sigmund Romberg. Kern began by revising British musicals to suit American audiences, adding songs that "have a timeless, distinctly American sound that redefined the Broadway showtune."

The Princess Theatre was a simply designed, 299-seat Broadway theatre that had failed to attract successful productions because of its small size. Theatre agent Elisabeth Marbury asked Kern and Bolton to write a series of musicals specifically tailored to its smaller setting, with an intimate style and modest budgets, that would provide an alternative to the star-studded extravaganzas of Ziegfeld and others. Kern and Bolton's first Princess Theatre musical was Nobody's Home (1915), an adaptation of a London show called Mr. Popple of Ippleton. Very Good Eddie was their second.

This was followed by an even bigger hit in 1917, Oh, Boy! and several others, all featuring modern American settings and simple scene changes (one set for each act) to more aptly suit the small theatre, eschewing operetta traditions of foreign locales and elaborate scenery. In Very Good Eddie, guests have names like Gay Anne Giddy, Fullern A. Goat, Tayleurs Dummee and Always Innit, and the voice teacher has a student called "Lily Pond" (a likely allusion to the renaming of a town in Maryland from Lily Pond to Lilypons in honor of the noted opera soprano Lily Pons).

== Synopsis ==
Note: This is a synopsis of the original 1915 Libretto. Alterations were made and many songs were added for the 1975 revival version.

=== Act I ===
The Hudson River Day Line boat "The Catskill" is under way on a summer day (“We’re on Our Way”). The boat stops for fifteen minutes at Poughkeepsie, New York. Dick Rivers comes aboard and tells Victoria Lake and the girls that he has fallen in love with Elsie Lilly, the star pupil of the great voice teacher Madame Matroppo (“The Same Old Game”). To be alone with Elsie, he persuades Madame Matroppo to let him interview her pupil for a magazine article. Elsie is not easily wooed. She tells Dick that she used to be engaged to a man named Eddie. She has heard that Dick is always in love with the next girl he meets (“Some Sort of Somebody”).

After some arguing, newlyweds Eddie and Georgina Kettle board the boat. Eddie is much smaller than Georgina and she treats him like an infant. Georgina asks Eddie if he has been in love before her, and he says he used to have an affair with a girl named Elsie. Then two other honeymooners, Percy and Elsie Darling enter. In this relationship, Percy belittles Elsie. As the couples run into each other, Eddie and Percy turn out to be college friends. The couples rejoice (“Isn't it Great to Be Married”).

Georgina and Percy get off the boat and leave Eddie and Elsie Darling behind. Georgina has to find Eddie's missing luggage, and Percy needs to send a telegram. The boat suddenly leaves, and Eddie and Elsie have no idea what to do without their partners. They decide to get off at the next stop and attempt to make their way back to their partners. When they decide to eat, they realize they don't have any money. Eddie sees his acquaintance Dick Rivers and decides to ask him for some money. Eddie pretends that Elsie Darling is his bride so that Dick will give him 20 dollars as a honeymoon gift. Dick tells him about his newfound love, Elsie Lilly and that she is on the boat as well. He does not realize that Eddie and Elsie Lilly are old lovers. Dick leaves, and Eddie and Elsie Darling sit down to eat. Elsie encourages Eddie to have a martini, and he immediately feels drunk. Dick returns with Madama Matroppo and introduces her to the "newlyweds". Eddie orders champagne for everyone as they celebrate (“Wedding Bells Are Calling Me”).

=== Act II ===
At the Rip Van Winkle Inn, it is evening (“On the Beach of Li-Li-Wee”). Eddie and Elsie Darling realize that there is no return boat or train until the next day. They get two separate rooms at the Inn. Eddie must use Percy's luggage since he left his own suitcase back in Poughkeepsie. He spills rice out of Percy's suitcase, and the drunken desk clerk thinks that the pair are married. This means they must register as husband and wife. Elsie convinces Eddie that he must destroy the register, since it could be used as evidence to request a divorce. Madame Matroppo enters and informs Eddie that Elsie Lilly and Dick are also staying at the Inn. The clerk guides Eddie and Elsie Darling to their rooms. Dick enters and expresses his confusion about Eddie's behavior towards his “wife” to Madame Matroppo (“If I Find the Girl”). Eddie leaves his room and secretly spills ink on the register to cover his name. Madame Matroppo is looking for her French admirer when she runs into the clerk who expresses his love for her (“The Triangle”). Eddie invites Elsie Darling for dinner downstairs, but she declines. Eddie meets Madame Matroppo at dinner but she refuses to sit with him and says he must go upstairs to dine with his "wife". Eddie laments his size and his low status (“When Your Collar Is No. 13 and Your Shoes No. 3”).

Dick finally runs into Elsie Lilly and confesses his love for her. She tells him she doesn't want to settle down, but he tells her that he doesn't want to either (“Old Boy Neutral”). Georgina and Percy arrive at the Inn but they can't be sure whether Eddie and Elsie Darling are guests because the register is ruined. It is late so they decide to stay at the Inn as well. To the surprise of the clerk they also get two separate rooms. Georgina learns that Percy's wife is named Elsie and comes to the unsettling conclusion that she must be the same Elsie that Eddie loved long ago. Unhappily they both go to bed. Meanwhile, Elsie Darling knocks on Eddie's door because she is afraid a mouse is in her room. He comforts her and tells her to be brave (“Babes in the Wood”).

The next morning Elsie Lilly finds out that Dick got her red roses all the way from New York. Victoria Lake and her girls sing (“The Fashion Show”). Dick meets Percy and Georgina and informs them that the "newlyweds" Eddie and Elsie Darling are at the Inn. He tells them how they had cocktails on the boat; Percy and Georgina are shocked and angry. The clerk informs Madame Matroppo that he has to sing in a minute, and he needs a last minute voice lesson. She decides to hypnotize him, and he tells her he used to be a cashier in a police station. He fantasizes about money and having someone to share it with (“I’d Like to Have a Million in the Bank”).

Eddie bought a few left over roses from Dick and knocks on Elsie Darling's door to give them to her. She starts crying when she sees him in Percy's pajamas. Elsie Lilly and Dick enter and once again he confesses his love for her. This time she accepts it (“Holding Roses”). Eddie tells Elsie Darling that Madame Matroppo is suspicious of their “marriage” so they decide to speak very lovingly to each other in the hope that she can hear them. Unfortunately, Percy and Georgina hear them and angrily confront them. But Eddie and Elsie Darling have learned how to handle themselves. Eddie explains the facts, and both of them finally stand up to their partners. Eddie orders Georgina to sit down, and she does. The delighted clerk shouts admiringly, "Very Good, Eddie!” (“Finale”).

== Productions ==
Produced by Elisabeth Marbury and F. Ray Comstock, the original Broadway production opened on December 23, 1915 at the Princess Theatre. In May 1916, it moved to the Casino Theatre, and in September it transferred to the 39th Street Theatre, returning to the Princess Theatre to end its run on October 14, 1916, after a total of 341 performances. The cast included Ernest Truex and Helen Raymond. The sets were designed by the interior decorator Elsie de Wolfe, who also coordinated the costumes. This was followed by an Australian production in 1917 featuring Barry Lupino, and a London production in 1918 at the Palace Theatre.

In 1975, the Goodspeed Opera House in East Haddam, Connecticut revived the show to great acclaim, prompting the producers to transfer it to Broadway. After three previews, it opened on December 21, 1975 at the Booth Theatre, where it ran for 304 performances. The cast, directed by Bill Gile, and choreographed by Dan Siretta, included Charles Repole, Virginia Seidel, James Harder, and Travis Hudson. This was followed, the next year, by a US tour. In 1976, the musical ran for 411 performances at the Piccadilly Theatre in London's West End. The cast included Prue Clarke. In addition to the original lyricists, the 1975–1976 productions included lyrics by P. G. Wodehouse, Anne Caldwell, Frank Craven and Graham John.

== Principal roles and original cast ==
- Steward (on "The Catskill") – Benjamin F. Wright
- Monsieur De Rougement – James Lounsbery
- Purser (on "The Catskill") – Lew Fullerton
- Dick Rivers – Oscar Shaw
- Mme. Madame Matroppo – Ada Lewis
- Elsie Lilly – Anna Orr
- Eddie Kettle – Ernest Truex
- Georgina Kettle (his wife) – Helen Raymond
- Percy Darling – John Willard
- Elsie Darling (his wife) – Alice Dovey
- Al Cleveland (clerk at The Rip Van Winkle Inn) – John E. Hazzard
- Victoria Lake – Julia Mills
- Chrystal Poole – Tess Mayer
- Lily Pond – Bessie Kelly
- Belle Fontaine – Arline Chase
- Flo Tide – Marie Kittridge
- Virginia Spring – Dorothy Silvia

== Songs ==
Act I

- Overture
- We're on Our Way – (Victoria Lake and Ensemble)
- The Same Old Game** – (Dick Rivers and Girls)
- Some Sort of Somebody – (Dick and Elsie Lilly) (from Miss Information; lyrics by Janis)
- Thirteen Collar* – (Eddie)
- Bungalow in Quogue* – (Elsie and Percy Darling) (lyrics By P. G. Wodehouse)
- Isn't it Great to Be Married? – (Eddie and Georgina Kettle, Elsie and Percy Darling)
- Good Night Boat* – (Company) (lyrics by Anne Caldwell and Frank Craven)
- Left All Alone Again Blues* – (Elsie Darling) (lyrics by Caldwell)
- Hot Dog!* – (Company) (lyrics by Caldwell)
- If You're a Friend of Mine* – (Elsie Darling and Eddie) (Lyrics by Harry Graham)
- Wedding Bells Are Calling Me – (from Nobody Home; Lyrics by Smith)

*Songs from 1975 revival
**Not in the 1975 revival

Act II

- On the Shore at Le Lei Wi** – (Elsie Lilly, Dick and Ensemble) (music by Kailimai and Kern)
- If I Find the Girl** – (Dick and Ensemble) (lyrics by Reynolds and Hazzard)
- Thirteen Collar** – (Eddie)
- Honeymoon Inn* – (Elsie Lilly and Company) (lyrics by Wodehouse)
- I've Got to Dance* – (M. de Rougemont and Company)
- Moon of Love* – (Mme. Matroppo and Company) (lyrics by Caldwell)
- Old Boy Neutral – (Elsie Lilly, Dick and Ensemble)
- Babes in the Wood – (Elsie Darling and Eddie) (Lyrics by Kern and Greene)
- The Fashion Show** – (Victoria and Ensemble)
- I Wish I Had a Million** – (Al Cleveland and Girls)
- Katy-Did* – (Mme. Matroppo) (lyrics by Smith)
- Holding Roses – (Elsie Lilly, Miss Rivers and Dick) (lyrics by Reynolds and Hazzard)
- Finale – (Company) (lyrics by Reynolds and Hazzard)

== Awards and nominations ==
=== 1975 Broadway production ===
Year	Award	Category	Nominee	Result
1976	Tony Award	Best Performance by a Featured Actor in a Musical	Charles Repole	Nominated
1976	Tony Award	Best Performance by a Featured Actress in a Musical	Virginia Seidel	Nominated
1976	Tony Award	Best Direction of a Musical	Bill Gile	Nominated
1976	Theatre World Award		Charles Repole	Won
1976	Theatre World Award		Virginia Seidel	Won
1976	Drama Desk Award	Outstanding Revival		Nominated
1976	Drama Desk Award	Outstanding Actress in a Musical	Virginia Seidel	Nominated
1976	Drama Desk Award	Outstanding Featured Actor in a Musical	James Harder	Nominated
1976	Drama Desk Award	Outstanding Featured Actress in a Musical	Travis Hudson	Nominated

=== 1976 London production ===
Year	Award	Category	Nominee	Result
1976	Laurence Olivier Award	Best New Musical		Nominated
