= Alice's Adventures in Wonderland (1910 film) =

Alice in Wonderland
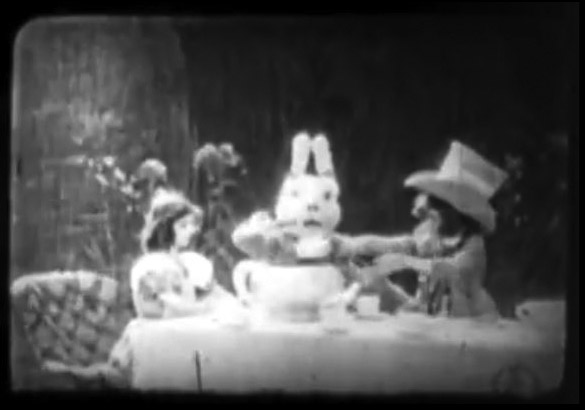
- Directed by: Edwin S. Porter
- Written by: Lewis Carroll (book)
- Based on: Alice's Adventures in Wonderland by Lewis Carroll
- Starring: Gladys Hulette
- Distributed by: Edison Manufacturing Company
- Release date: September 9, 1910
- Running time: 10 minutes
- Country: United States
- Language: Silent film

Alice's Adventures in Wonderland is a 10-minute black-and-white silent film made in the United States in 1910, based on Lewis Carroll's 1865 book of the same name.

Produced by the Edison Manufacturing Company and directed by Edwin S. Porter, the film starred Gladys Hulette as Alice. Being a silent film, naturally all of Lewis Carroll's nonsensical prose could not be used, and, being only a one-reel picture, many of the memorable characters in Carroll's original 1865 novel similarly could not be included. What was used in the film was faithful in spirit to Carroll, and in design to the original John Tenniel illustrations. Variety complimented the picture by comparing it favorably to the "foreign" film fantasies then flooding American cinemas.

== Plot ==
Alice sees the White Rabbit run by, checking its pocketwatch. Intrigued, she follows him down the rabbit hole and into Wonderland. She lands in a room lined with doors, but finds all of them locked. She finds a key on a table that opens a tiny door. Frustrated that she can't fit through the door, she discovers a bottle has appeared on the table. She drinks its contents and shrinks down to the size of the little door. Realizing she left the key on the table and can't reach it, she eats a piece of cake that makes her grow even bigger than her original size.

She sees the White Rabbit run through the room, and she's so unhappy that she begins to cry. She weeps a pool of tears and splashes in it, but she dries off quickly. Next she punches through the little door that leads to a garden. The White Rabbit and other small animals are alarmed to see a giant hand reaching through the door, and they run away. She finds a little fan, and when she fans herself, she shrinks back down to the correct height for the door. Emerging at last into the garden, she's frightened by an enormous puppy.

Approaching a little house, she sees a fish-footman hand a frog-footman an invitation from the Queen of Hearts to the Duchess. Plates fly out of the door, so she enters the house and finds the Duchess, the Cook, the Baby and the Cheshire Cat. The Cook adds too much pepper to her food, and the sneezing Duchess hands Alice the Baby. Going outside with the Baby, she finds that it's turned into a little pig. The Cheshire Cat appears in a tree, and tells her that "We're all mad here. I'm mad. You're mad."

Next, Alice comes across a mad tea-party, hosted by the March Hare, the Mad Hatter and the sleepy Dormouse. Then she finds the topiary garden, where a pack of playing-card soldiers and other members of the royal court greet the King and Queen of Hearts. Spying some roses that have not been painted red, the Queen scolds some playing cards and shouts, "Off with their heads!"

Retiring to a room in the castle, Alice is present for a party where the King and Queen of Hearts discover that the Knave of Hearts has stolen some tarts. A trial ensues, where the Mad Hatter, the Cook and Alice present evidence. Alice upsets the King and Queen, and the Queen shouts "Off with her head!" Alice is surrounded by a swirl of playing cards, and then wakes up to find that her adventure in Wonderland was a dream.

== Gallery ==
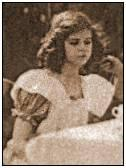
Gladys Hulette as 'Alice'

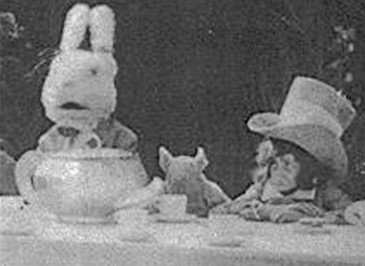
The Mad Hatter and the March Hare

== See also ==
- List of American films of 1910
