= Her Beloved Enemy =

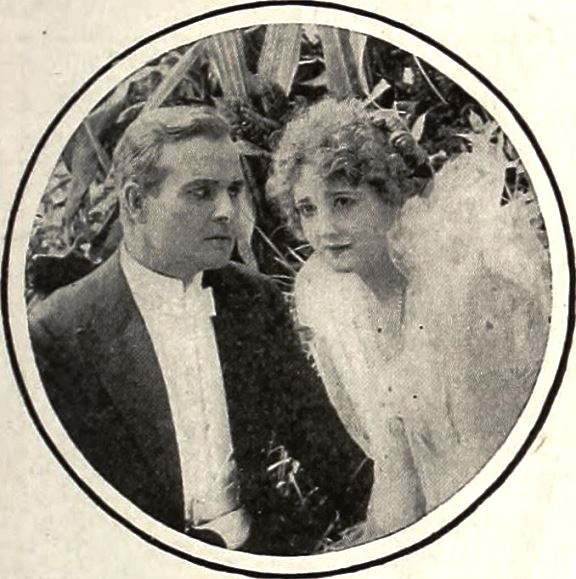
- Still with Arey and Grey
- Directed by: Ernest C. Warde
- Written by: Lloyd Lonergan; Philip Lonergan
- Produced by: Edwin Thanhouser
- Starring: Doris Grey; Wayne Arey; J. H. Gilmour
- Cinematography: William Zollinger
- Production company: Thanhouser Film Corporation
- Distributed by: Pathé Exchange
- Release date: March 4, 1917
- Running time: 5 reels
- Country: United States
- Language: Silent (English intertitles)

Her Beloved Enemy is a 1917 American silent mystery film directed by Ernest C. Warde and starring Doris Grey, Wayne Arey, and J. H. Gilmour.

== Cast ==
- Doris Grey as Sylvia Leigh
- Wayne Arey as Enemy of Sylvia's Father
- J. H. Gilmour as Sylvia's Father
- Gladys Leslie as Dorothy, Sylvia's Friend
- Ernest Howard as Undetermined Role
- Carey L. Hastings as Undetermined Role
- Anna Buchanan as Undetermined Role

== Bibliography ==
- Robert B. Connelly. The Silents: Silent Feature Films, 1910-36, Volume 40, Issue 2. December Press, 1998.
