= Waifs (film) =

1918 film

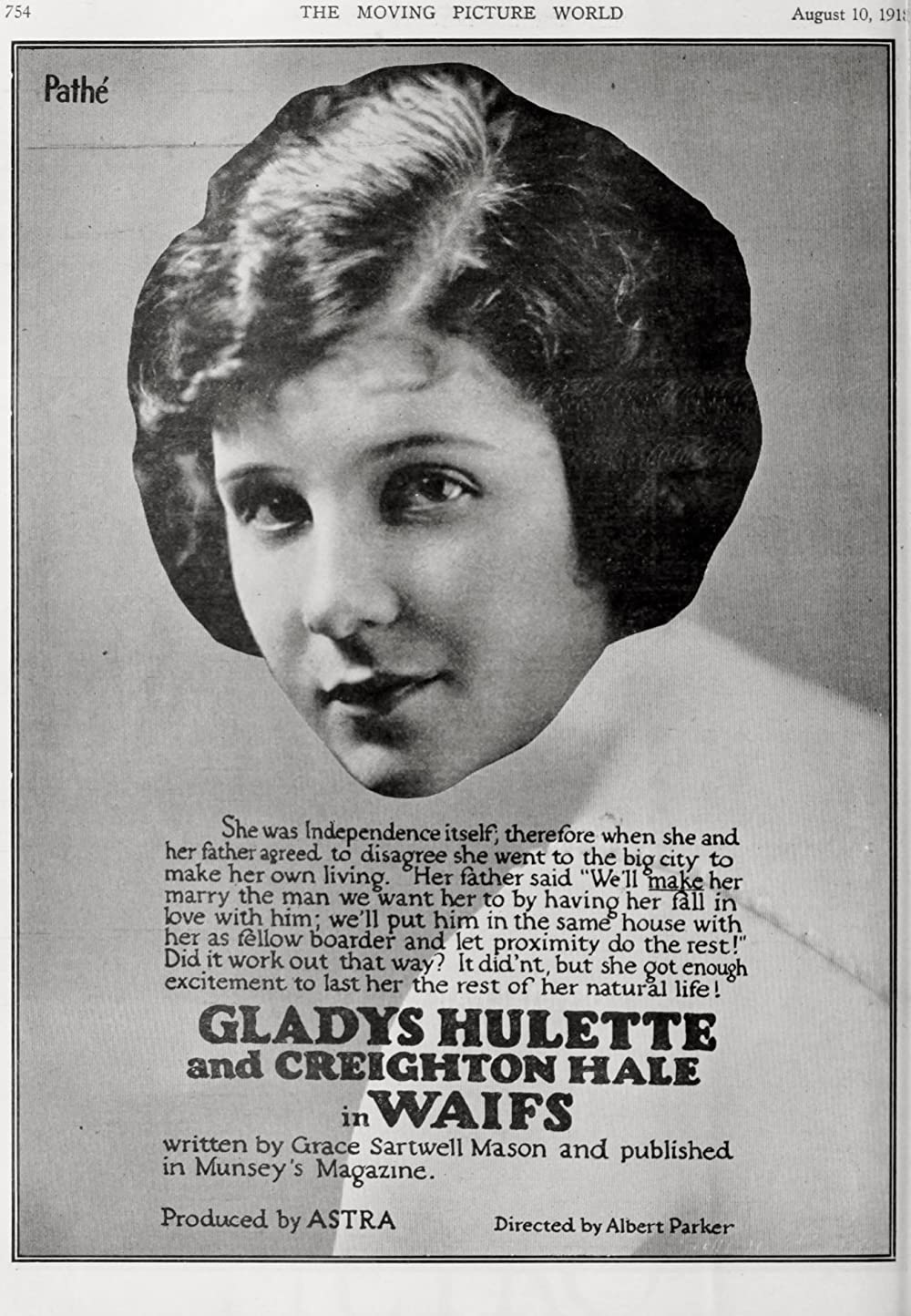
- Directed by: Albert Parker
- Written by: Grace Sartwell Mason; Frank Leon Smith
- Starring: Gladys Hulette; Creighton Hale; Walter Hiers
- Cinematography: Alfred Ortlieb
- Production company: Astra Film
- Distributed by: Pathé Exchange
- Release date: August 4, 1918
- Running time: 50 minutes
- Country: United States
- Languages: Silent; English intertitles

Waifs is a 1918 American silent comedy drama film directed by Albert Parker and starring Gladys Hulette, Creighton Hale and Walter Hiers.

== Cast ==
- Gladys Hulette as Marjorie Whitney
- Creighton Hale as Fitzjames Powers
- J.H. Gilmour as Marjorie's Father
- Walter Hiers as Elmer Poindexter

== Bibliography ==
- Rainey, Buck. Sweethearts of the Sage: Biographies and Filmographies of 258 actresses appearing in Western movies. McFarland & Company, 1992.
