= Over the Hill (1917 film) =

1917 silent short film directed by William Parke

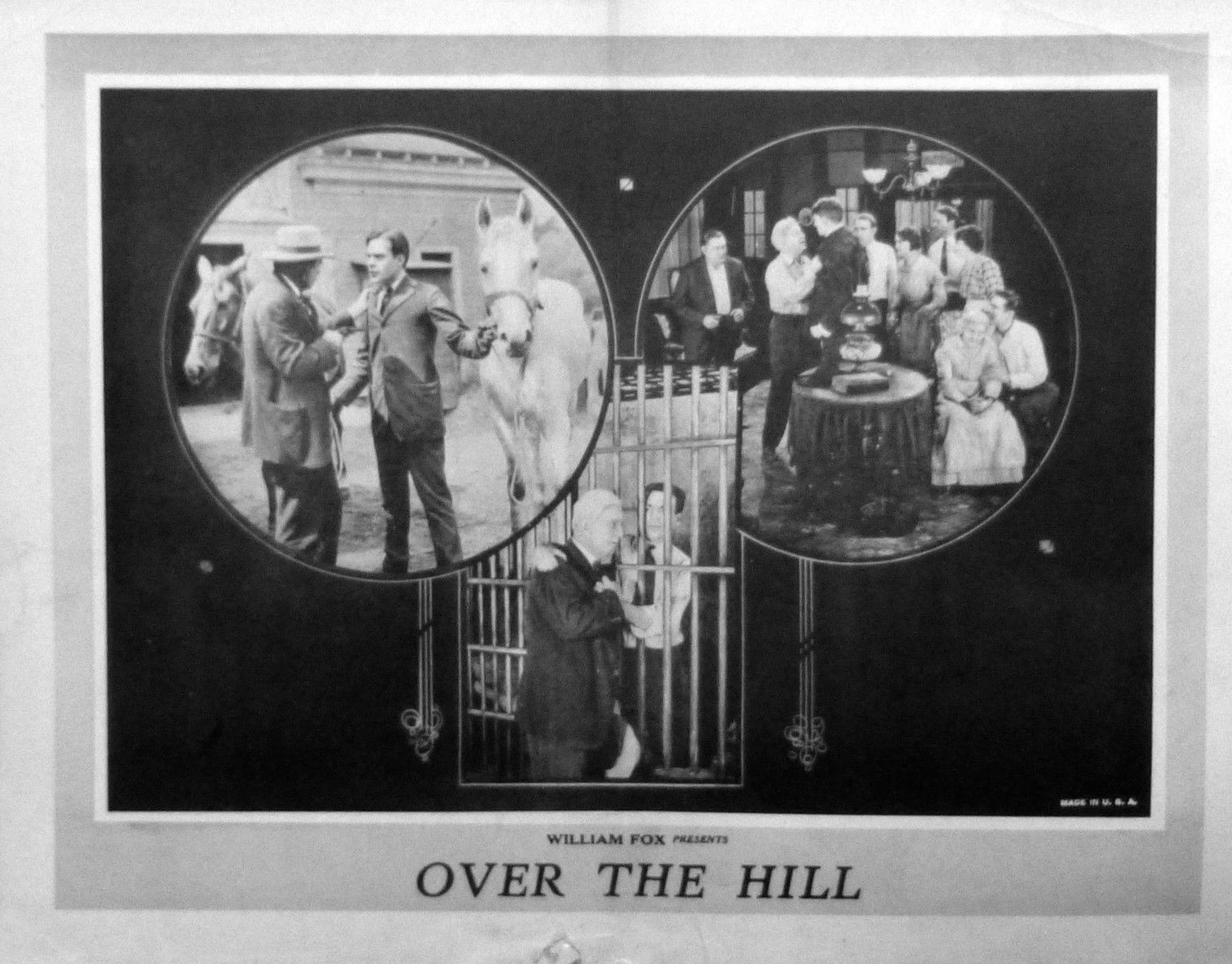
- Directed by: William Parke
- Written by: Lois Zellner
- Starring: Gladys Hulette; J.H. Gilmour; Dan Mason
- Cinematography: Albert Richard
- Production company: Astra Film
- Distributed by: Pathé Exchange
- Release date: December 30, 1917
- Country: United States
- Languages: Silent; English intertitles

Over the Hill is a 1917 American silent drama film directed by William Parke and starring Gladys Hulette, J.H. Gilmour and Dan Mason.

== Cast ==
- Gladys Hulette as Esther
- J.H. Gilmour as Amos Winthrop
- Dan Mason as Reverend Timothy Neal
- William Parke Jr. as Roy Winthrop
- Chester Barnett as Allen Stone
- Richard Thornton as Jim Barnes
- Joyce Fair as Rose Lawlor
- Paul Clerget as Mr. Lawlor
- Tula Belle as Rose's Sister
- Inda Palmer as Mrs. Finn
- John Carr as Mike
- Billy Sullivan as King Arthur

== Bibliography ==
- Langman, Larry. The Media in the Movies: A Catalog of American Journalism Films, 1900-1996. McFarland & Company, 1998.
