= The Candy Girl =

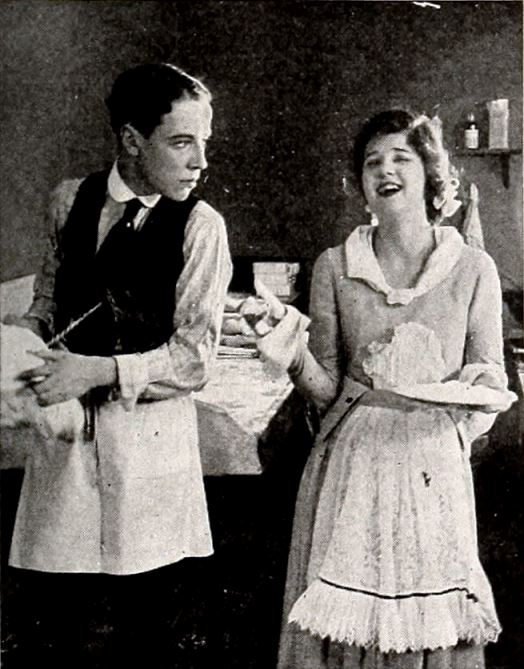
- Still with Parke and Hulette
- Directed by: Eugene Moore
- Written by: Philip Lonergan
- Produced by: Edwin Thanhouser
- Starring: Gladys Hulette; William Parke Jr.; J.H. Gilmour
- Cinematography: George Webber
- Production company: Thanhouser Film Corporation
- Distributed by: Pathé Exchange
- Release date: May 20, 1917
- Country: United States
- Language: Silent (English intertitles)

The Candy Girl is a 1917 American silent drama film directed by Eugene Moore and starring Gladys Hulette, William Parke Jr., and J.H. Gilmour.

== Plot ==
Nell (Gladys Hulette) leaves the farm to start a candy store in New York, but has a troubled start until she meets Jack Monroe (William Park Jr.), a young spend thrift who helps her attract business. They fall in love, marry, and move in with Jack's father (J. H. Gilmour). Nell soon discovers that Jack is a drug addict. In sympathy, Jack's father offers to annul the marriage, but Nell refuses, wishing instead to commit herself to the indefinite struggle of pursuing the road to Jack's rehabilitation.

== Cast ==
- Gladys Hulette as Nell
- William Parke Jr. as Jack Monroe
- J.H. Gilmour as Jack's Father
- John Bowers as Simon Skinner (as John E. Bowers)
- Thomas A. Curran as George Wingate
- Ethyle Cooke
- Carey L. Hastings as Simon Skinner's Wife
- Arthur Bauer
- Justus D. Barnes as Officer Quinn
- Celia Clay
- Helen Badgley as Nell's Little Sister

== Reception ==
The film was well-received and Hulette's performance as Nell was especially praised. Exhibitor's Trade Review wrote, "The Candy Girl offers a typical vehicle for this particular star and a story that is brimming over with human interest. Its success lies in the quaint pathetic appeal intermingled with a tinge of humor that increases the holding power upon an audience."

The Moving Picture World wrote that, "The characters are well drawn, especially that of the candy girl herself. Miss Hulette does not merely play the part - she lives it. The Candy Girl seems destined to rank with the best of her previous successes."

== Bibliography ==
- Langman, Larry. American Film Cycles: The Silent Era. Greenwood Publishing, 1998.
