= Over Night =

1910 American play by Phillip Bartholomae

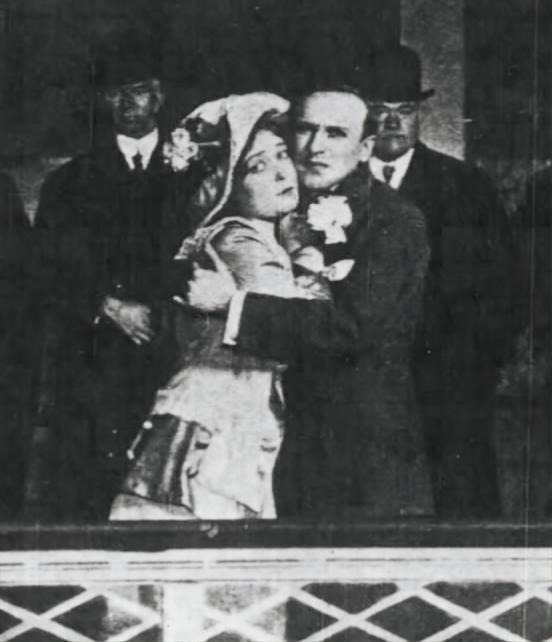
- Margaret Lawrence and Herbert Yost
- Original language: English
- Written by: Philip Bartholomae
- Subject: Marital farce
- Genre: Comedy
- Setting: A Hudson River steamship and a Poughkeepsie, New York inn

Premiere
- Date: January 2, 1911
- Place: Hackett Theatre
- Directed by: William A. Brady

Over Night is a 1910 American play by Philip Bartholomae. It is a farce in three acts, with two settings, and thirteen characters. The story concerns two mismatched newlywed couples who are compelled to temporarily swap partners through circumstance while traveling. The action of the play takes place within 24 hours.

The play was first produced by the author for a one-time performance in November 1910. It was purchased by William A. Brady, who produced and staged it for Broadway starting in January 1911. Over Night starred Herbert A. Yost and Margaret Lawrence, with Robert Kelly, Jean Newcombe, and Arthur Aylesworth in support. Its run finished in May 1911 after 166 performances.

Bartholomae later adapted his play into a screenplay for a 1915 silent film of the same name, and into a hit Broadway musical Very Good Eddie.

== Characters ==
Characters are as listed in contemporaneous newspaper reviews.

Leads

- Richard Kettle is an average-sized newlywed husband, the son of a famous suffragette.
- Elsie Darling is a diminutive and dainty newlywed, who favors pink in her attire.

Supporting

- Percy Darling is the tall, strong newlywed husband of Elsie; Richard's classmate at Yale.
- Georgina Kettle is the tall, fierce newlywed wife of Richard, and herself a suffragette.
- Hotel Clerk amuses himself by interfering with the affairs of the Rip Van Winkle Inn guests.

Featured

- Caroline Patschen
- Caroline Powers
- Al Rivers
- Mrs. S. Rutherford-Cleveland
- Prof. Diggs is a professional hypnotist staying at the Rip Van Winkle Inn.
- Purser
- Steward
- Porter

Walk-ons

- Passengers, crewmen, and hotel guests.

== Synopsis ==
This synopsis is compiled from contemporaneous newspaper reviews.

Act I (Deck of the S. S. Hendrik Hudson. Afternoon.) The newlywed Kettles and Darlings are travelling together on a ship of the Hudson River Day Line to a Catskill Mountains resort for their honeymoons. After boarding the ship, they find some of their luggage has been left behind on the dock. Percy Darling and Georgina Kettle race to retrieve their bags, and the ship sails without them. Richard Kettle, recognized as the son of a famous suffragette, is known to have been recently married, so Elsie is mistaken for his bride. The situation becomes acute, when Elsie, who has old-fashioned values, is presumed to be in favor of women voting and is coerced into making a speech for female suffrage. Richard is compelled to protect her from the other passengers overwhelming interest. They decide to leave the ship at the next landing. (Curtain)

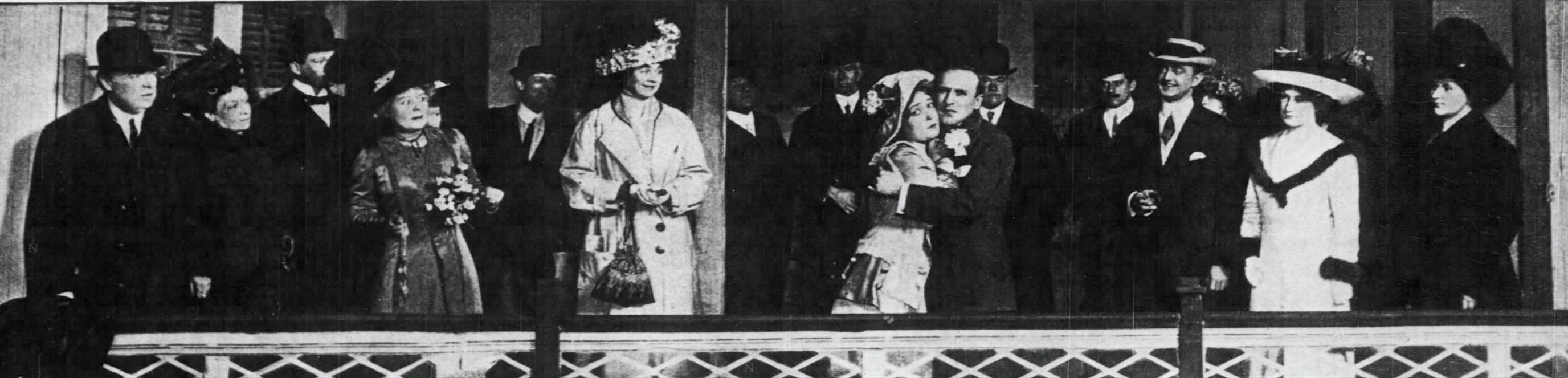

Act II (Rip Van Winkle Inn. That evening.) At Poughkeepsie, New York, Richard and Elsie are dismayed to find the last train for the Catskill Mountain resort has already departed. Because some passengers from the ship have also come to the Rip Van Winkle Inn, they have to register as newlyweds but ask for separate rooms, arousing the interest of the hotel clerk. Through his meddling, Richard and Elsie are launched into a series of misadventures and near compromising situations, culminating with Richard falling down the stairs in the hotel lobby. (Curtain)

Act III (Same as Act II. Next morning.) Percy and Georgina arrive at the Rip Van Winkle Inn, and become enraged when they see Richard and Elsie arm-in-arm in the lobby. They demand an explanation, but are satisfied when Professor Diggs hypnotizes Elsie and she reveals nothing untoward happened. Richard has also discovered new confidence in himself to deal with Georgina's overwhelming personality, and both couples proceed on to their honeymoons in happiness. (Curtain)

== Original production ==
=== Background ===
The first and only tryout for Over Night came on Saturday, November 5, 1910, at the Empire Theatre in Glens Falls, New York. Advertisements listed the author's name and identified the cast as "metropolitan"; there was no producer mentioned. A newspaper article identified the author, Philip Bartholomae, as a resident of Troy, New York, "well known in literary circles". The article described the play's plot and settings, broken down by act, and specified the action all took place between noon of one day and the next. The only cast member of the production mentioned was Jean Newcombe.

In early December 1910, it was reported that William A. Brady had purchased Over Night, and that rehearsals would begin soon.

=== Cast ===
Cast for the Broadway run.
Role	Actor	Dates	Notes and sources
Richard Kettle	Herbert A. Yost	Jan 02, 1911 - May 20, 1911	Yost had been acting in stock and repertory for twelve years before making a hit on Broadway.
Elsie Darling	Margaret Lawrence	Jan 02, 1911 - May 20, 1911	
Percy Darling	Robert Kelly	Jan 02, 1911 - May 20, 1911	
Georgina Kettle	Jean Newcombe	Jan 02, 1911 - May 20, 1911	
Hotel Clerk	Arthur Aylesworth	Jan 02, 1911 - May 20, 1911	
Caroline Patschen	Grace Griswold	Jan 02, 1911 - May 20, 1911	
Caroline Powers	Norma Winslow	Jan 02, 1911 - May 20, 1911	
Al Rivers	Wallace Worsley	Jan 02, 1911 - May 20, 1911	
Mrs. Rutherford-Cleveland	Teresa Deagle	Jan 02, 1911 - May 20, 1911	
Professor Diggs	Max Freeman	Jan 02, 1911 - May 20, 1911	
Purser	Royal Barton	Jan 02, 1911 - May 20, 1911	
Steward	John Morton	Jan 02, 1911 - May 20, 1911	
Porter	Joseph Dillon	Jan 02, 1911 - May 20, 1911	

=== Broadway premiere and reception ===
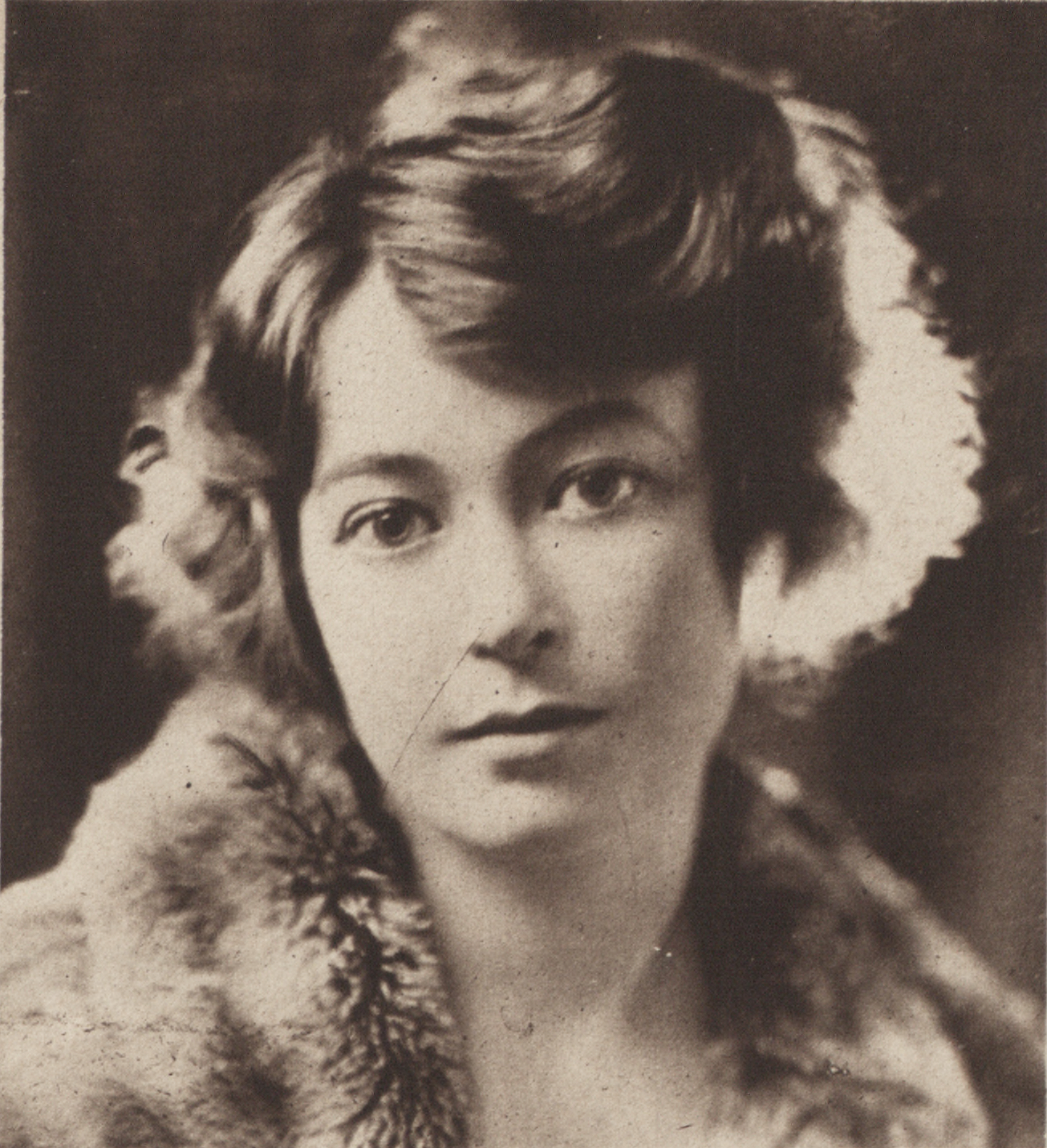
Margaret Lawrence 1919

Over Night had its Broadway premiere at the Hackett Theatre on January 2, 1911. The New York Times reviewer consistently misidentified the title as "Overnight", though the advertising department got it right. They did mention the playwright's reticence in making a curtain speech, and considered Arthur Aylesworth, Margaret Lawrence, and Herbert A. Yost to have been the most favored performers. The critic for The Sun thought "With the vulgarity removed it may last several nights". They judged Arthur Aylesworth to have done the best acting as "a fresh, talkative, slangy hotel clerk, who relieves a tiresome job by meddling with the affairs of the patrons of the hotel".

Sometime in January 1911 Herbert Yost broke a rib during his nightly fall down the stairs of the Rip Van Winkle Inn. As he was experiencing a personal triumph with the success of the show he starred in, he elected to continue performing the intentional fall, aided by extensive bandages and football padding. By February 5, 1911, the Brooklyn Citizen reported audiences, small during the opening week, had been growing continuously since, while a week later it added that seats were now selling six weeks in advance. During one performance a real cocktail was substituted for the prop drink that Herbert Yost drinks in Act I. Yost, a teetotaler, thought he had drunk "a glass of nitro glycerin". He got tipsy then belligerent. An amateur boxer, he challenged "Props" to come get a beating, and had Margaret Lawrence in tears, while the audience roared with laughter, thinking it part of the play.

=== Change of venue ===
On Saturday, April 15, 1911, Over Night closed at the Hackett Theater, and was moved to producer William Brady's new Playhouse Theatre the following Monday, April 17, 1911. Brady's wife Grace George had opened the Playhouse that same Saturday with two performances of Sauce for the Goose. Over Night was the second production mounted at the new venue.

=== Broadway closing ===
The production closed its Broadway run at the Playhouse Theater on Saturday, May 20, 1911.

== Adaptations ==
=== Film ===
Bartholomae also adapted his play for a December 1915 silent film of the same name. Produced by William A. Brady and World Film Corporation in five reels, it was directed by James Young, and starred Vivian Martin and Sam Hardy, with Arthur Aylesworth reprising his hotel clerk role from the original play. The film featured a suffragette parade, in which appeared Carrie Chapman Catt, Inez Milholland, and Alva Belmont.

=== Stage ===
Bartholomae adapted Over Night in collaboration with Guy Bolton into the hit Broadway musical Very Good Eddie, which featured music by Jerome Kern.

== Bibliography ==
- Dan Dietz (2015). "Very Good Eddie". The Complete Book of 1970s Broadway Musicals. Rowman & Littlefield Publishers. ISBN 9781442251663.
- James Fisher, Felicia Hardison Londré (2009). The A to Z of American Theater: Modernism. Scarecrow Press. ISBN 9780810868847.
- Granville Forbes Sturgis (1913). The Influence of the Drama. Shakespeare Press.
