= Gladys Hulette =

American actress

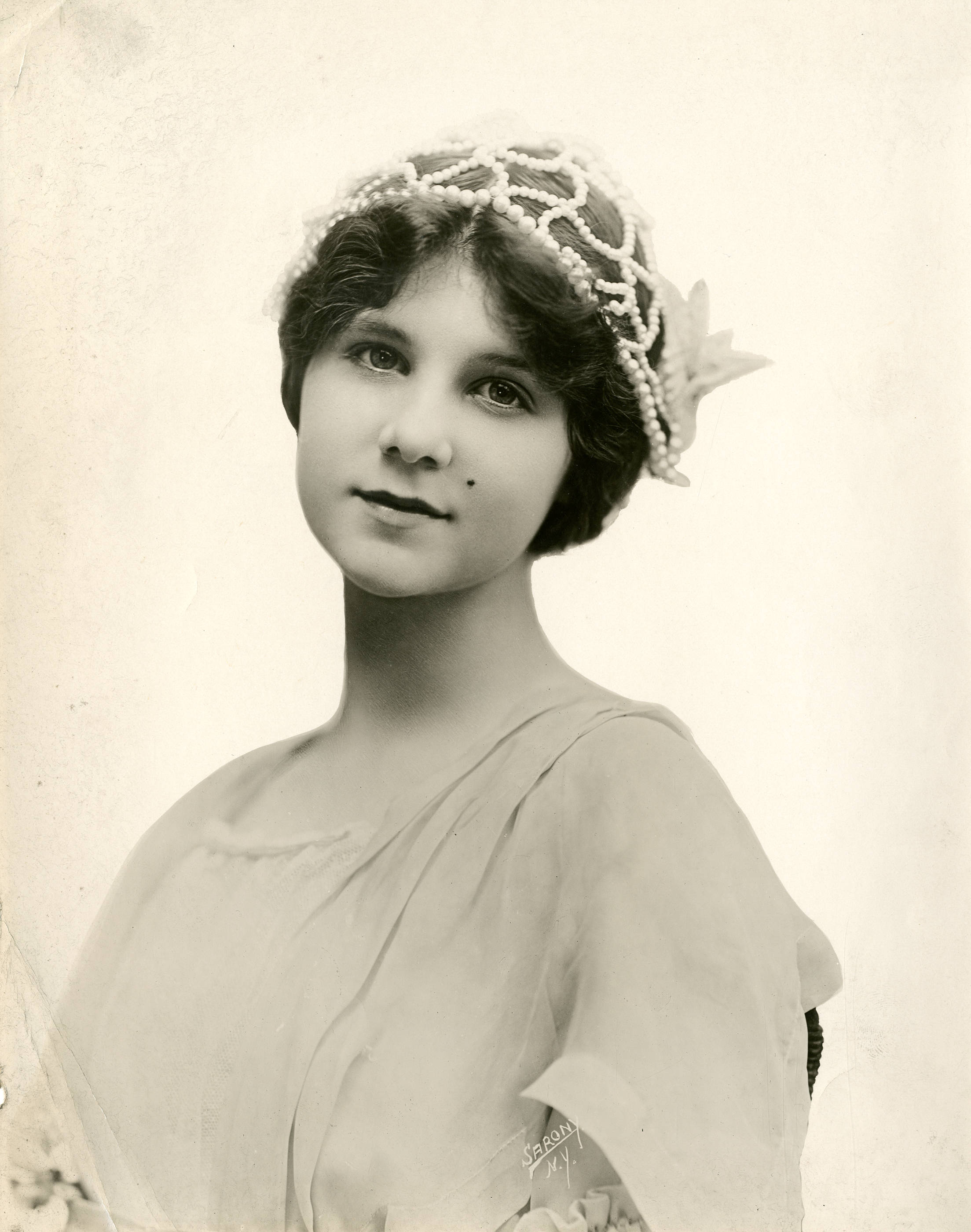
- Hulette in 1914
- Born: July 21, 1896; Arcade, New York, U.S.
- Died: August 8, 1991 (aged 95); Montebello, California, U.S.
- Occupation: Actress
- Years active: 1908–1934

Gladys Hulette (July 21, 1896 – August 8, 1991) was an American silent film actress from Arcade, New York. Her career began in the early years of silent movies and continued until the mid-1930s. She first performed on stage at age 3 and on screen when she was age 7. Hulette was also a talented artist. Her mother was an opera star.

== Child actress ==
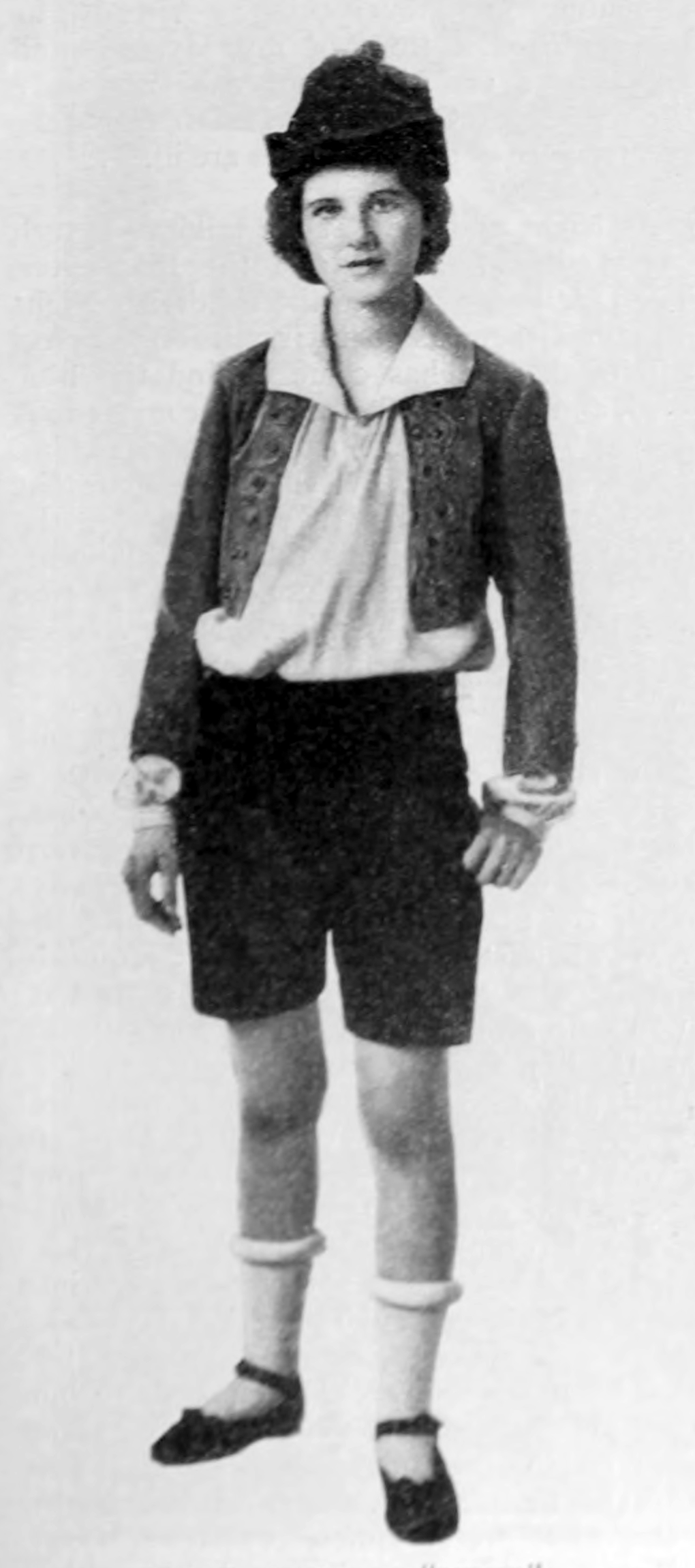
Gladys Hulette as Tyltyl in the Broadway production of The Blue Bird (1910)

Hulette was among the principal players in Sappho and Phaon which had its first performance in Providence, Rhode Island on October 4, 1907. She helped support Bertha Kalich in the Percy MacKaye production. As a child, she appeared in Romeo and Juliet (1908) and The Smoke Fairy (1909). On Broadway, in The Blue Bird (1910), she played Tyltyl. She was Beth in Little Women (1912). Her other Broadway credits included The Kreutzer Sonata (1906), A Doll's House (1907), and The Faith Healer (1910).

== Silent film player ==
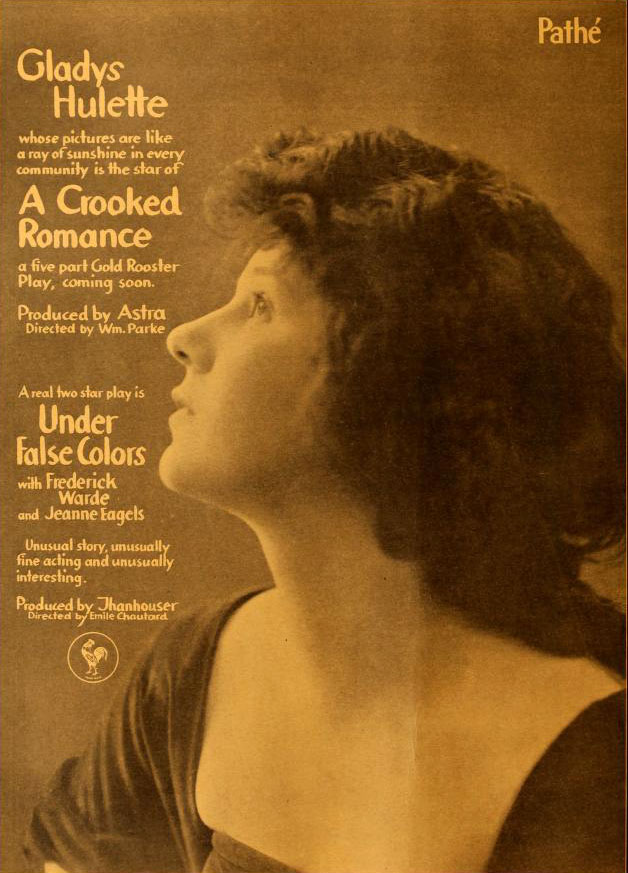
A Crooked Romance (1917)

In her early movies, she was under contract to Vitagraph Studios. There was a stigma for Broadway theater actors to be seen in motion pictures when silent films first began to be made. Hulette later said "the picture heroes were mostly Coney Island life savers." One company prevailed upon a leading stage actor to play the role of Hamlet on screen. It began the influx of more Broadway actors into the new medium.

By 1917, Hulette's films were being produced by leading director William Parke. In this year, she made her most popular film to date, Streets of Illusion. She played the part of Beam, and her co-stars included Richard Barthelmess and J.H. Gilmour. Parke owned theatrical companies and assisted Hulette in making movies.

She married William Parke Jr., the director's son in 1917. They divorced in 1924.

By 1921, she was a veteran of the motion picture industry. She again played opposite Barthelmess in Tol'able David. She played the ingenue part of Esther Hatburn. In an interview, she said she wished for no different type of roles than the one she played in this film. Later she sought comedy-drama parts which she portrayed in Jack O' Hearts (1926) and A Bowery Cinderella (1927).

She researched her own roles, such as the dance hall girl she played in The U.P. Trail (1924). Hulette consulted Social Life of the Pioneers for the Fox Film production. The book was published in the 1880s in San Francisco. She discovered that saloons in America's old west provided "a softening influence and the nucleus of community consciousness" due to the young women entertainers found there.

== Late career ==
Hulette made her debut in sound films in Torch Singer (1933). Her final film appearances came in Her Resale Value (1933) and with uncredited roles in The Girl from Missouri and One Hour Late, both from 1934. In 1948, she and another former Thanhouser player Grace DeCarlton were working as ticket sellers at Radio City Music Hall in New York City.

In the early 1980s, Hulette was visited by film historian Walter Coppedge while living under distressed circumstances as a ward of the state in an institution in Rosemead, California. Coppedge wrote: "Yet her eyes are bright, her figure supple, her complexion pink and porcelain. She is still graciously appreciative of kindness, especially the assurance that she would not be forgotten as long as people look at her films."

== Death ==
Gladys Hulette died in Montebello, California on August 8, 1991, aged 95.

== Selected filmography ==
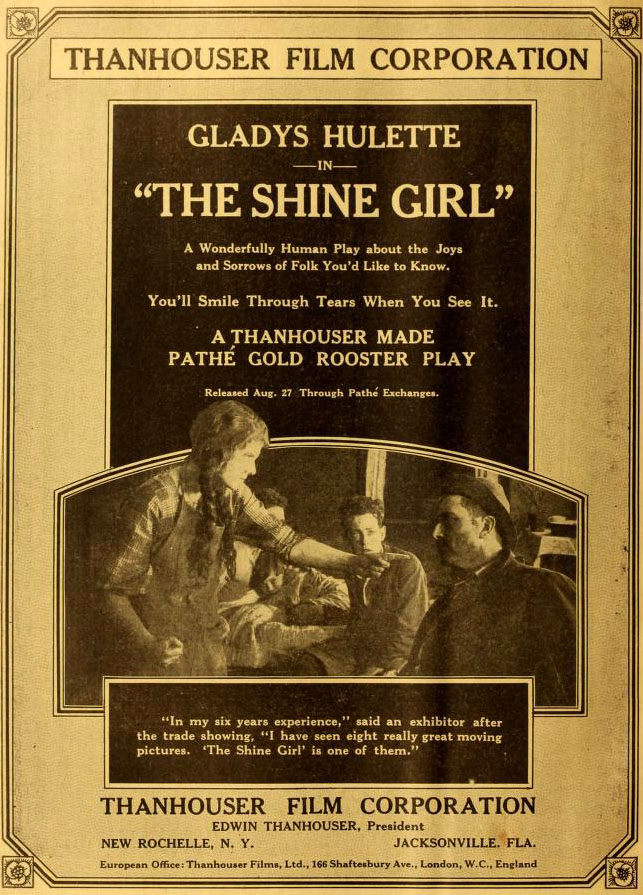
The Shine Girl (1916)

- Romeo and Juliet (1908)
- Princess Nicotine; or, The Smoke Fairy (1909)
- A Midsummer Night's Dream (1909)
- Alice's Adventures in Wonderland (1910)
- The Librarian (1912, Short)
- The Active Life of Dolly of the Dailies (1914)
- Eugene Aram (1915)
- The Shine Girl (1916)
- In the Name of the Law (1916)
- Prudence the Pirate (1916)
- A Crooked Romance (1917)
- The Cigarette Girl (1917)
- Her New York (1917)
- The Candy Girl (1917)
- The Streets of Illusion (1917)
- The Last of the Carnabys (1917)
- Over the Hill (1917)
- Miss Nobody (1917)
- For Sale (1918)
- Annexing Bill (1918)
- Waifs (1918)
- The Silent Barrier (1920)
- Tol'able David (1921)
- The Referee (1922)
- Fair Lady (1922)
- How Women Love (1922)
- The Secrets of Paris (1922)
- Enemies of Women (1923)
- Hoodman Blind (1923)
- As a Man Lives (1923)
- The Iron Horse (1924)
- The Slanderers (1924)
- The Family Secret (1924)
- The Night Message (1924)
- The Ridin' Kid from Powder River (1924)
- The Thoroughbred (1925)
- Private Affairs (1925)
- Lena Rivers (1925)
- The Pride of the Force (1925)
- The Mystic (1925)
- Go Straight (1925)
- The Skyrocket (1926)
- Be Your Age (1926)
- The Night Owl (1926)
- The Warning Signal (1926)
- Unknown Treasures (1926)
- Combat (1927)
- A Bowery Cinderella (1927)
- Faithless Lover (1928)
- Making the Varsity (1928)
- Life's Crossroads (1928)
- Her Resale Value (1933)
