= Philip Lonergan =

American screenwriter

- Born: 1887
- Died: 1940 (aged 52–53)
- Occupation: Screenwriter

Philip Lonergan (1887–1940) was a screenwriter in the United States.

He was part of a family of prominent screenwriters. Lloyd Lonergan was his brother.

== Filmography ==
- The Phantom Witness
- The Little Girl Next Door (1912)
- The World and the Woman (1916), co-wrote with William C. deMille
- King Lear (1916 film)
- The Barrier of Flames (1914)
- Silas Marner (1916 film)
- Her Beloved Enemy (1917)
- The Candy Girl (1917)
- War and the Woman (1917)
- Her Life and His (1917)
- The Fugitive (1916 film)
- Woman, Saint and Devil
- Mandarin's Gold (1919)
- Almost Married (1919 film)
- The Penalty (1920 film) with Charles Kenyon
- The Girl with the Jazz Heart (1921), co-wrote with George Mooser
- The Steadfast Heart (1923), adaptation
- Wine (1924 film)
- Private Izzy Murphy (1926), adaptation
