= Almost Married (1919 film) =

1919 film by Charles Swickard

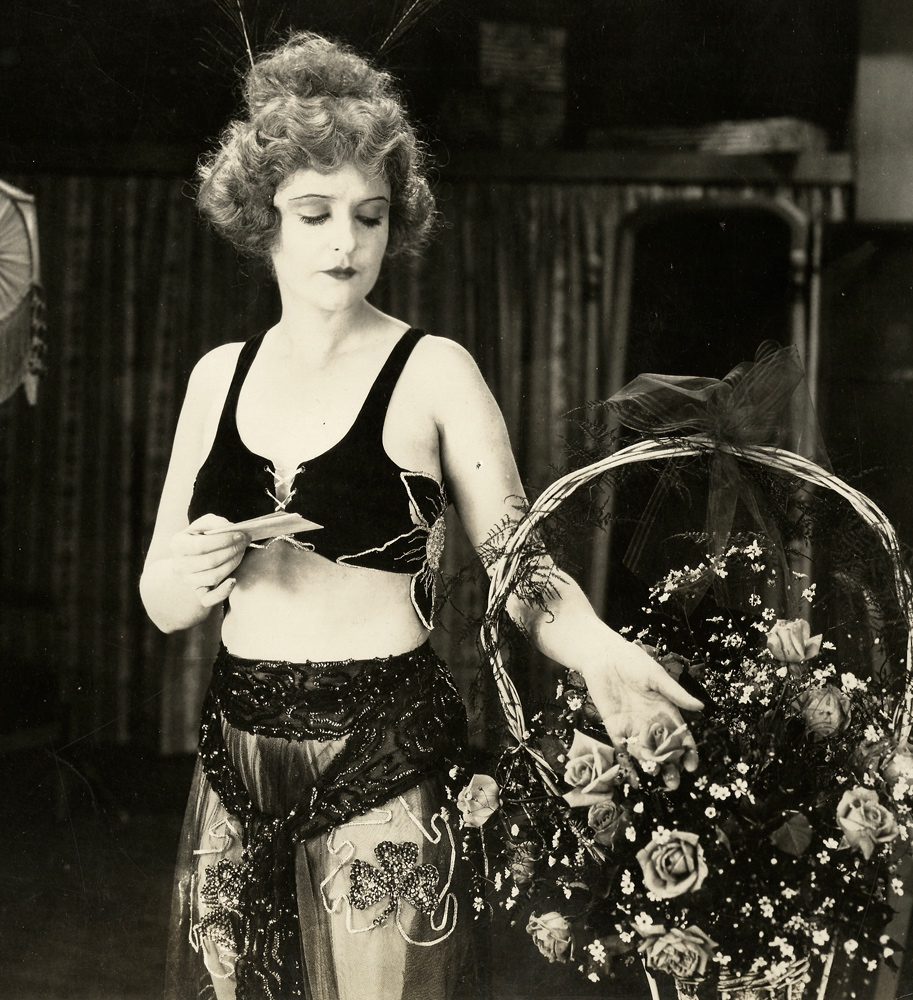
- Still with May Allison
- Directed by: Charles Swickard
- Written by: Philip Lonergan; June Mathis; Luther Reed
- Story by: E.V. Durling
- Produced by: Maxwell Karger
- Starring: May Allison
- Cinematography: William Fildew
- Distributed by: Metro Pictures
- Release date: June 2, 1919
- Running time: 5 reels
- Country: United States
- Language: Silent (English intertitles)

Almost Married is a lost 1919 American silent comedy drama film directed by Charles Swickard and starring May Allison. It was produced and distributed by Metro Pictures.

== Cast ==
- May Allison as Adrienne Le Blanc
- June Elvidge as Patricia 'Patty' Hudson
- Sam Hardy as Lt. James Winthrop, Jr.
- Walter Percival as Carrington O'Connell (credited as Walter I. Percival)
- Frank Currier as Michael O'Connell
- Malcolm Fassatt as Walter Kirkwood
- William T. Carleton as James Winthrop, Sr. (credited as W.T. Carleton)
- Harry L. Rattenberry as Papa Le Blanc
- Wharton James as Hastings (credited as James Wharton James)
- Hugh Fay as Manny Morrison
