= Charles Repole =

American actor

Charles Repole is an American actor, theater director, and college professor.

Repole made his Broadway debut in Very Good Eddie in 1975, earning a Tony Award nomination and a Theatre World Award for his performance. Additional Broadway credits include the 1979 revival of Whoopee!, which garnered him a Drama Desk Award nomination, Doubles (1985), and Gentlemen Prefer Blondes (1995), which he directed.

Repole's directing experience ranges from Broadway to the Kennedy Center to Carnegie Hall to regional theatre. He has helmed concert versions of DuBarry Was a Lady with Faith Prince and Robert Morse and Call Me Madam with Tyne Daly for the New York City Center Encores! series. Since 1999, he has conceived and directed the annual fund-raising gala for the 92nd Street Y which included working with such performers as Alvin Ailey, Martha Graham, Angela Lansbury, Bebe Neuwirth, Jerry Herman, Carol Channing, and Elaine Stritch, among many others. He also conceived and has directed the MAC Awards.

Repole also has directed productions of George M! with Joel Grey, Zorba with Anthony Quinn, Annie with Rue McClanahan, The Solid Gold Cadillac with Charlotte Rae, Pittsburgh Civic Light Opera's 50th Anniversary production of My Fair Lady, and a musical version of Animal Crackers at the Goodspeed Opera House. For his production of A Day in Hollywood/A Night in the Ukraine in Chicago, he was nominated for the Joseph Jefferson Award. He also directed the 1996 Papermill Mill Playhouse production of Cole Porter's musical You Never Know.

At present, Repole is the Chairperson of the Drama, Theatre, and Dance Department at Queens College in Flushing, New York, where he teaches Acting, Directing, and Musical Theatre Workshop. He also has directed many main stage productions there, including Bus Stop, Carousel, Guys and Dolls and Aaron Copland's opera The Tender Land.
