= Miss Nobody (1917 film) =

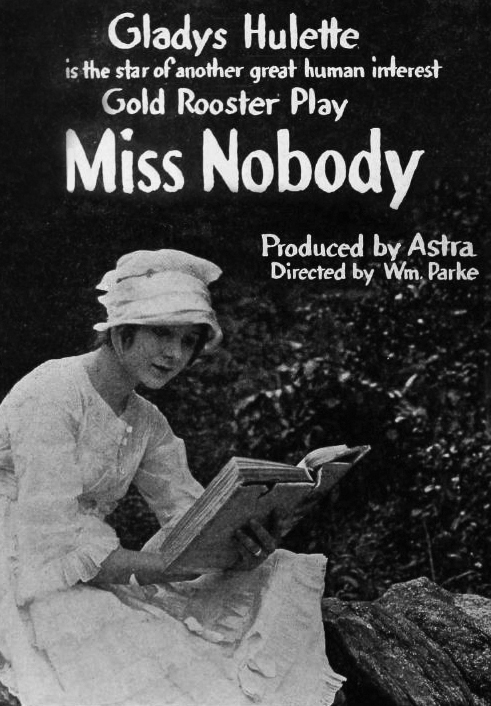
- Advertisement
- Directed by: William Parke
- Written by: Howard Irving Young
- Starring: Gladys Hulette
- Production company: Astra Film Corporation
- Distributed by: Pathé Exchange
- Release date: August 19, 1917
- Running time: 5 reels
- Country: United States
- Language: Silent (English intertitles)

Miss Nobody is a 1917 American silent drama film directed by William Parke and starring Gladys Hulette.

A print is preserved in the Cinémathèque Française.

== Cast ==
- Gladys Hulette as Roma
- Cesare Gravina as "Daddy" Crespi
- A. J. Andrews as "Uncle" Malone
- William Parke Jr. as Jack Thurston
- Sidney Mather as Roland Fabor (*Sydney Mather)
